= Anna Francisca de Bruyns =

French artist (1604-1675)

- Anne Françoise de Bruyns
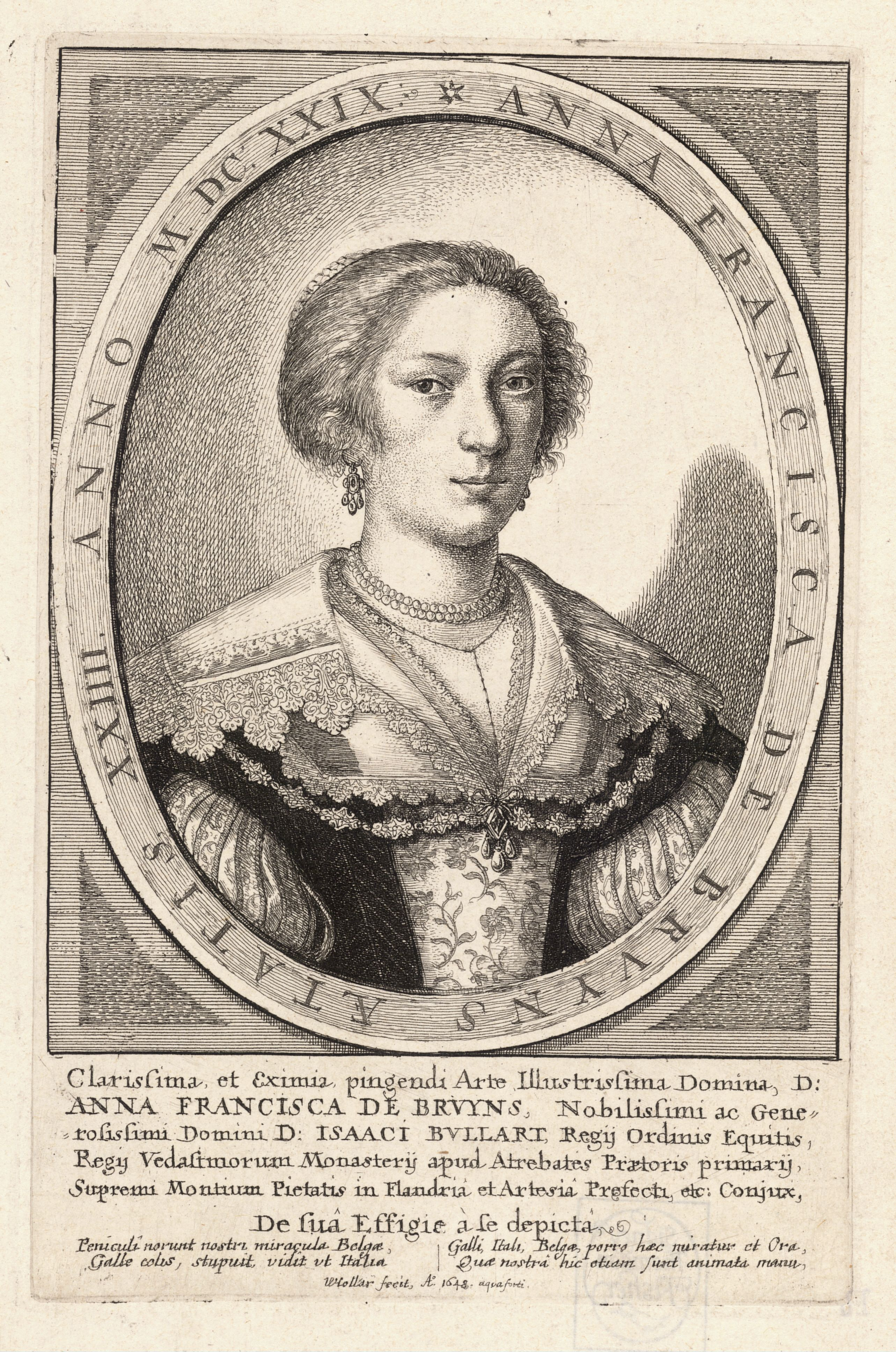
- A portrait of Anna Francisca de Bruyns, aged 24, engraved by Wenceslas Hollar.
- Born: 1604
- Died: 1675 (aged 70–71)
- Education: Probably taught by her uncle, Jacques Francquart
- Known for: Portraits
- Spouse: Isaac Bullart
- Patrons: Isabella Clara Eugenia

Anna Francisca de Bruyns (1604, in Morialmé – 1675, in Arras), sometimes known as Anne Françoise de Bruyns, was a Flemish Baroque painter. She was born in 1604 in Morialmé (near Dinant, in the province of Namur in modern-day Belgium). Born into an upper middle class family and raised by relatives who were employed as court artists, de Bruyns was one of many women artists of her time, and while there is little English scholarship about her, she is one of the best documented of her peers. She was taught to paint by her older cousin, Jacob Franquart. She was painting by the age of seventeen and is said to have surpassed many painters of her time.

== Career as an artist ==
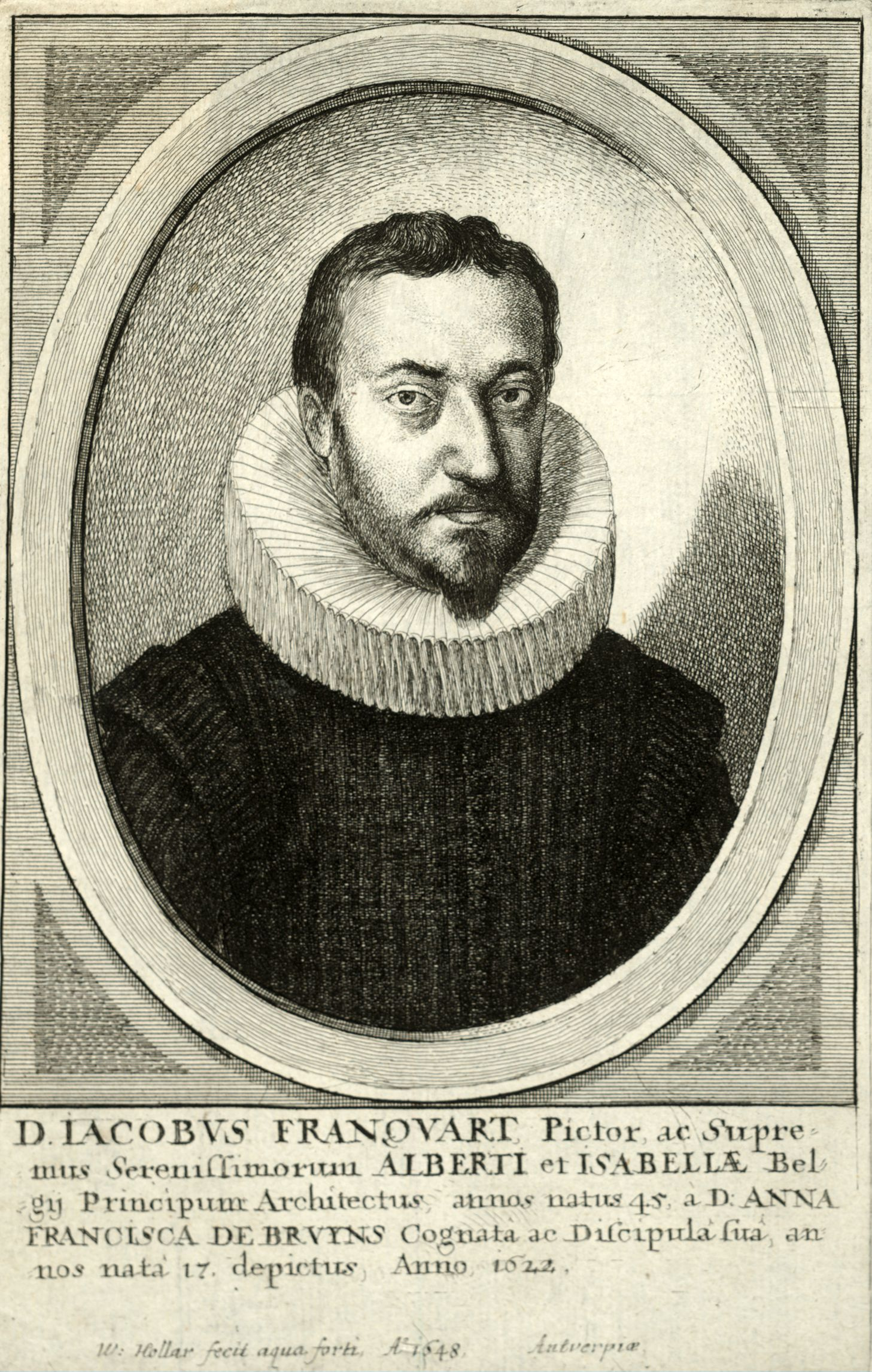
Anna Francisca de Bruyns, Portrait of Jacques Franquart, 1622.

At as young as eleven, Anna Francisca de Bruyns displayed talent and interest in the arts. In March 1616, de Bruyns made a masterful copy after a print of Mamluke horsemen by Jan Swart van Groningen. She also made pen and ink copies of pious prints such as depictions of the Virgin. Once she had acquired a level of skill in drawing she was sent to Brussels to sharpen her skills under the mentorship of her cousin Jacob Franquart. He was very serious with his tutoring and by 1622, at the age of seventeen, de Bruyns made a portrait of Franquart on a silver plate. Franquart also introduced de Bruyns to the Infanta Isabella Clara Eugenia, showing the future Netherlandish sovereign the portrait de Bruyns made of her. Isabella was so impressed with the portrait that Anna was commissioned to create fifteen small paintings of the Mysteries of the Rosary, which were sent as a gift to Pope Paul V. After De Bruyns marriage to Isaac Bullart in 1628, it became much harder for her to find time to paint, but she still managed to produce a significant number of paintings over her lifetime.

== Family ==
Anna Francisca de Bruyns upper-middle-class upbringing and relation to court artists gave her exceptional opportunities to develop her artistic craft. In 1613 her cousin, Jacob Franquart, was appointed court painter to the Hapsburg Netherlands Archdukes Albert and Isabella, and became Royal Architect-Engineer to Philip IV of Spain in 1622. De Bruyns's father, Cornilla de Bruyns, was bailiff of Morialmé from before she was born until moving to Mons where he became superintendent of the Bergh van Bermherticheyt (translated as public pawnshop) which was an institution founded many years earlier by Wenceslas Cobergher. Cobergher was a leading engineer, architect, painter, and numismatist of the time. Cobergher entered the service of the Archdukes who paid him three times as much as they would Rubens and was included in Anthony van Dyck's Iconography, a series of engraved portraits of the most well-known contemporary intellectuals, noblemen, and artists, which speaks to his prestige.

On May 30, 1628, in the Church of Saint-Germain in Mons, Anna married Isaac Bullart — a well-regarded Dutch-born writer — when she was twenty-four years old. The two met while Anna was studying under Franquart. Bullart actually struggled to win Anna's heart at first, as she was not very social. But he was "charmed as much by the beauty of her art as by the loveliness of her face" and she eventually consented and her parents approved. They had 12 children together. One year after their marriage, de Bruyns and Bullart moved to Arras, where on April 23 he was named the superintendent of the Mount of Piety. The couple's eldest son was born two weeks prior to the move, and was named Wenceslas, after Wenceslas Cobergher, who helped Bullart get his job as superintendent. Sadly, this son died in infancy. Bullart studied at the Jesuit College in Bordeaux and spent thirty years collecting material for his Académie des Sciences et des Arts, which contains 279 biographies of scholars and artists and is one of the most important biographical compendia of the seventeenth century. Bullart was even made a Chevalier de l'Ordre de Saint-Michel (Knight of the order of St. Michael) by Anne of Austria, Regent of France for her son Louis XIV in 1647.

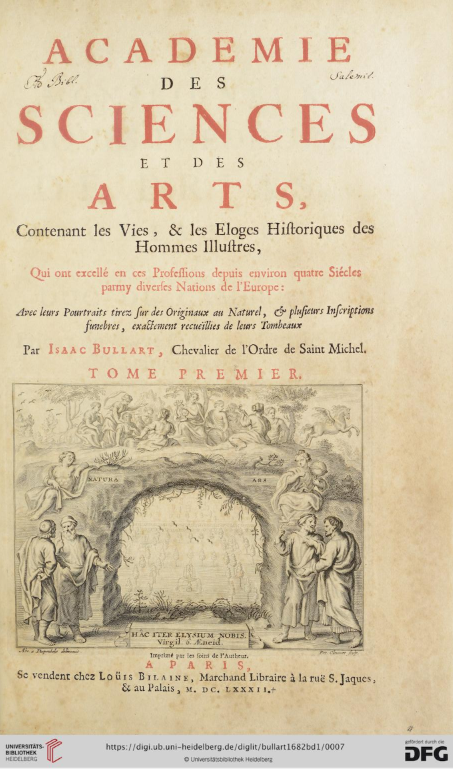
A scan of the title page of Anna Francisca's husband's two-volume book, Académie des Sciences et des Arts by Isaac Bullart.
