= Jacob Franquart =

Flemish architect and painter

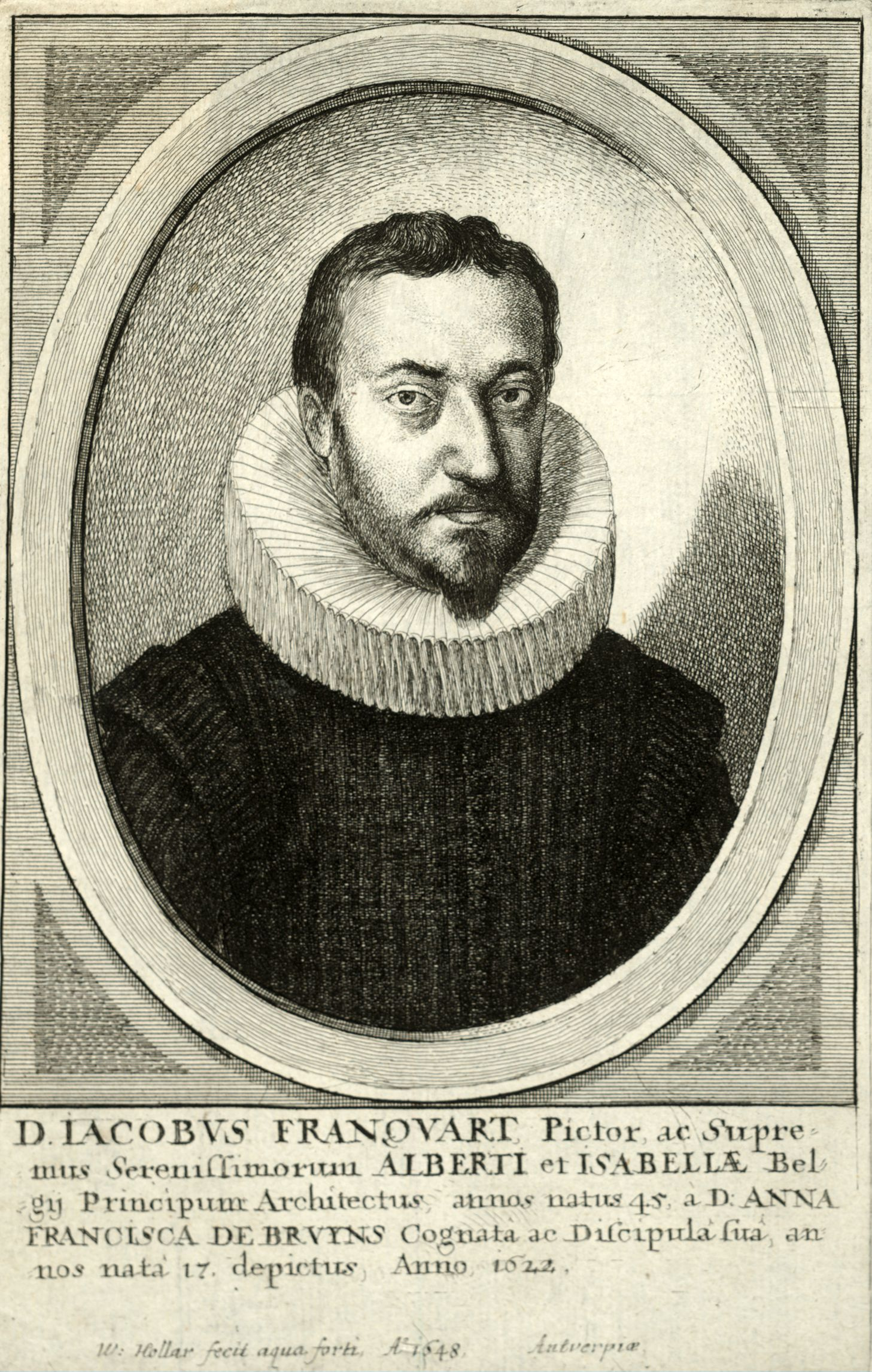
Portrait of Jacob Franquart, engraving by Wenceslas Hollar, 1648

Jacob Franquart or Jacob Franckaert the Younger (Note: Name variations: Jacob Francart, Franckaert, Francquaert, Jacques Franquart, Jacques Francquart, Francuart; monogram: IFS.) (1582/83 – buried 6 January 1651) was a Flemish architect, painter, print artist, draftsman, military engineer and poet. He is known for his altarpieces and publications on contemporary Italian architecture. He was employed by the court of the Archdukes Albert and Isabella in Brussels as a painter and architect. He was responsible for the design of ephemeral decorations and structure for important occasions at the court such as funerals. As an architect and decorator, he introduced the Baroque in the buildings of the Habsburg Netherlands. His style is sometimes referred to as the Italo-Flemish style and became very popular in Flanders in the 17th century. Only a few paintings are attributed to him.

== Life ==
Franquart was born in Antwerp or possibly Brussels as the son of Jacob Franckaert the Elder and Michaela del Tronco. His date of birth is not known with certainty. He was likely born in 1582 or 1583. His father was a painter and draughtsman known for his religious subjects, landscapes and architectural scenes, who became a master in the Antwerp Guild of Saint Luke in 1571. A sister of Jacob the Younger named Suzanna was born around 1584. Jacob the Elder is still mentioned in Antwerp in 1585. His father took his family via Paris to Italy in 1591. In Naples, Jacob the Elder started a collaboration with Wenceslas Cobergher, a Flemish painter who had trained in Antwerp with Maerten de Vos. They executed several paintings for the city's churches.

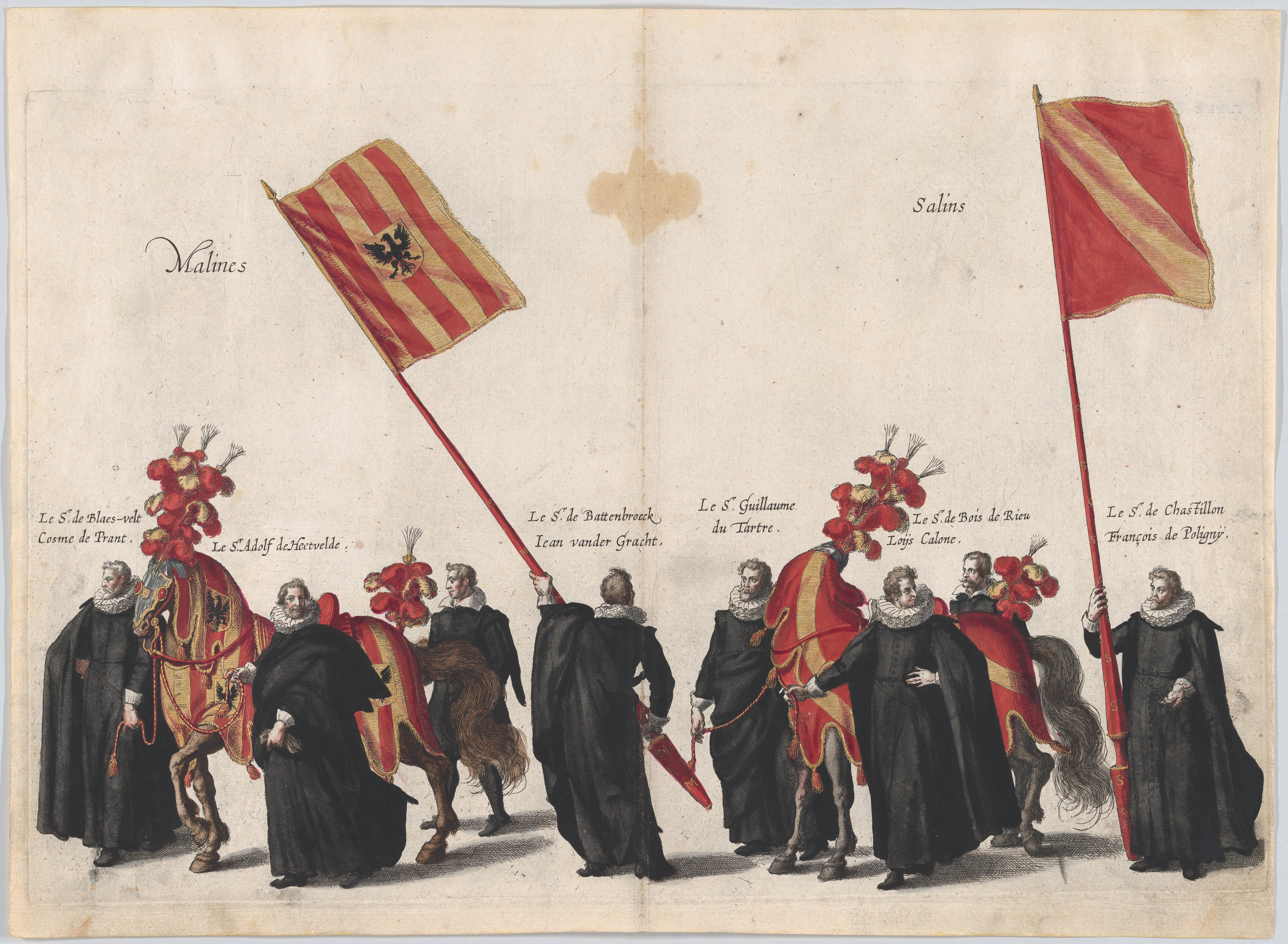
The funeral procession of Albert

Jacob the Elder moved with his family to Rome in 1594. Cobergher joined them and the two artists continued their collaboration. Four months after the death of his first wife, Cobergher married Suzanna Franckaert, the daughter of his collaborator, in Rome on 20 November 1599. At the time the Franquart family was registered in the register of the parish of San Lorenzo in Rome. In March 1601, the family was registered in the marriage register of the parish of San Lorenzo in Rome. It is difficult to discern in these works the contribution of either artist. Jacob started to study painting, likely with his father. In Rome, he had the opportunity to study the Antique and Renaissance architecture. He particularly admired the works of Michelangelo, Giacomo della Porta, Giacomo Barozzi da Vignola and Carlo Maderno.

Both parents of Jacob had died by September 1601 after which he lived with his sister Susanna and her husband Cobergher. At this time the Archdukes Albert and Isabella invited Cobergher to work for them at the court in Brussels causing him to leave Italy with his family. Jacob remained in Rome. At some point he got involved in a lawsuit regarding some stolen precious stones. The stones were rediscovered before the end of the trial. In the years 1607 and 1608, he was residing near the Santa Maria della Pace in Rome. Franquart returned to his homeland at the end of the trial and before the summer of 1611.

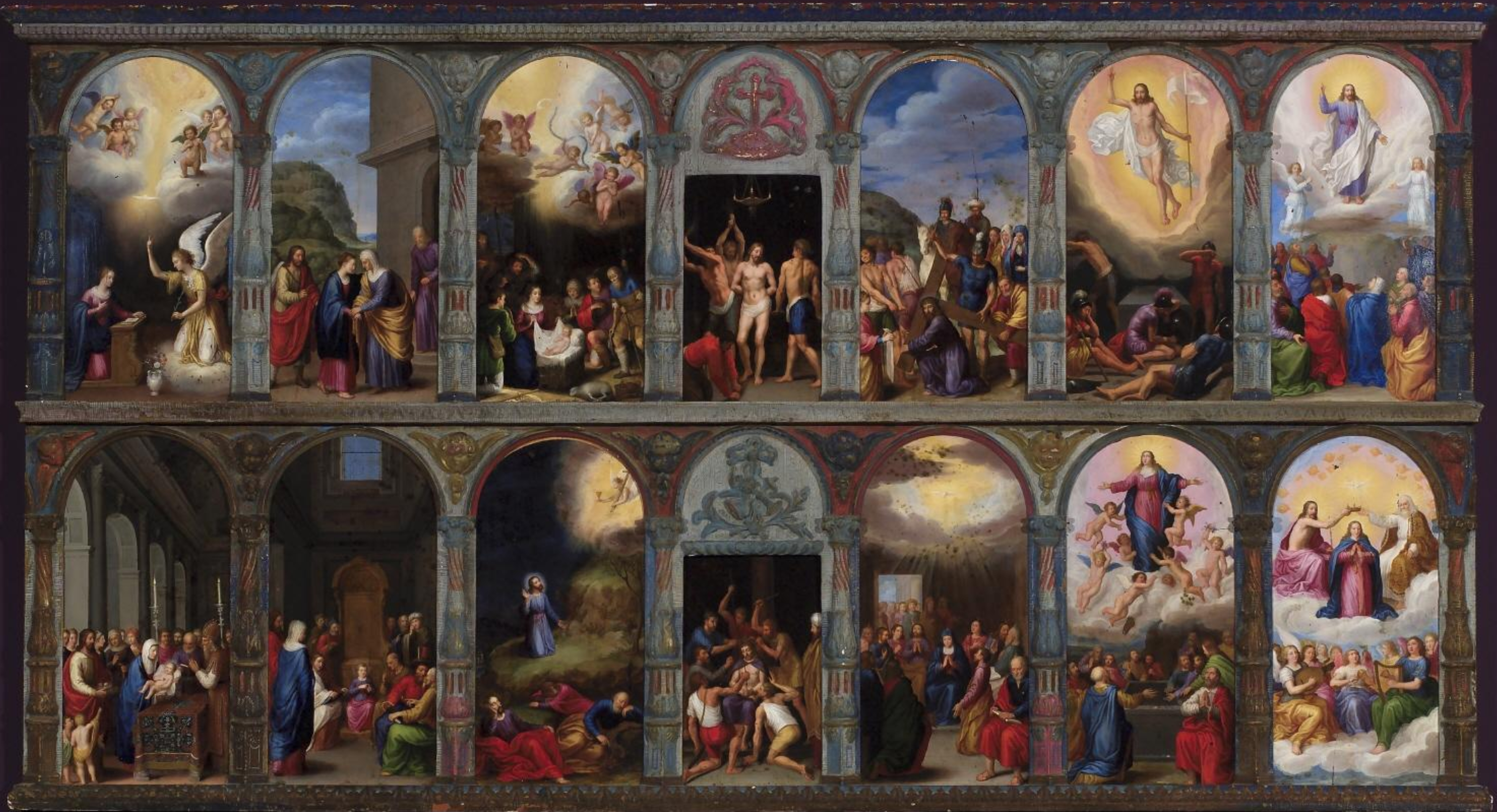
The presentation in the Temple, oil on canvas 1612

Some authors have stated that Franquart worked in the workshop of Rubens in Antwerp and that they were old friends. There is no documentary evidence for this. It is possible that the two artists got to know each other during their residence in Italy. Rubens' later purchase of Franquart's Premier Livre d'Architecture... (First book of Architecture) published in 1616 was possibly a sign of his respect for Franquart. Rubens may also have acquired the book purely for practical reasons as at that time he was carrying out renovations on his newly purchased home in Antwerp.

One month after the publication of Franquart's Premier Livre d'Architecture (Premier livre d'architecture de Iaques Francart : contenant diuerses inuentions de portes seruiables à tous ceux qui désirent bastir et pour sculpteurs, tailleurs de pieres, escriniers, massons et autres : en trois langues, in English First book of architecture of Jaques Francart : containing various inventions of doors useful to all those which wish to build and for sculptors, stone cutters, manufacturers of cases, masons and others: in three languages), he was asked to complete the Jesuit Church in Brussels (destroyed in 1812). Construction of the church had started in 1606 with Hendrik Hoeimaker as the building master. Franquart's involvement in this project launched his career as an architect. In 1620, he was put in charge of the construction of the Temple of the Augustinians in Brussels. In June 1621, he designed the funeral procession of the Archduke Albert. In 1629, he was commissioned to design the Beguinage Church in Mechelen. Franquart also rebuilt the Church of Our Lady by the Dijle in Mechelen, by adding a choir chapel and two side chapels as a continuation of the 16th-century choir. After Cobergher's death in 1632, Franquart was appointed engineer to the Spanish king. Franquart taught his niece Anna Francisca de Bruyns to paint. The leading Brussels sculptor Jérôme Duquesnoy the Younger was appointed as his assistant.

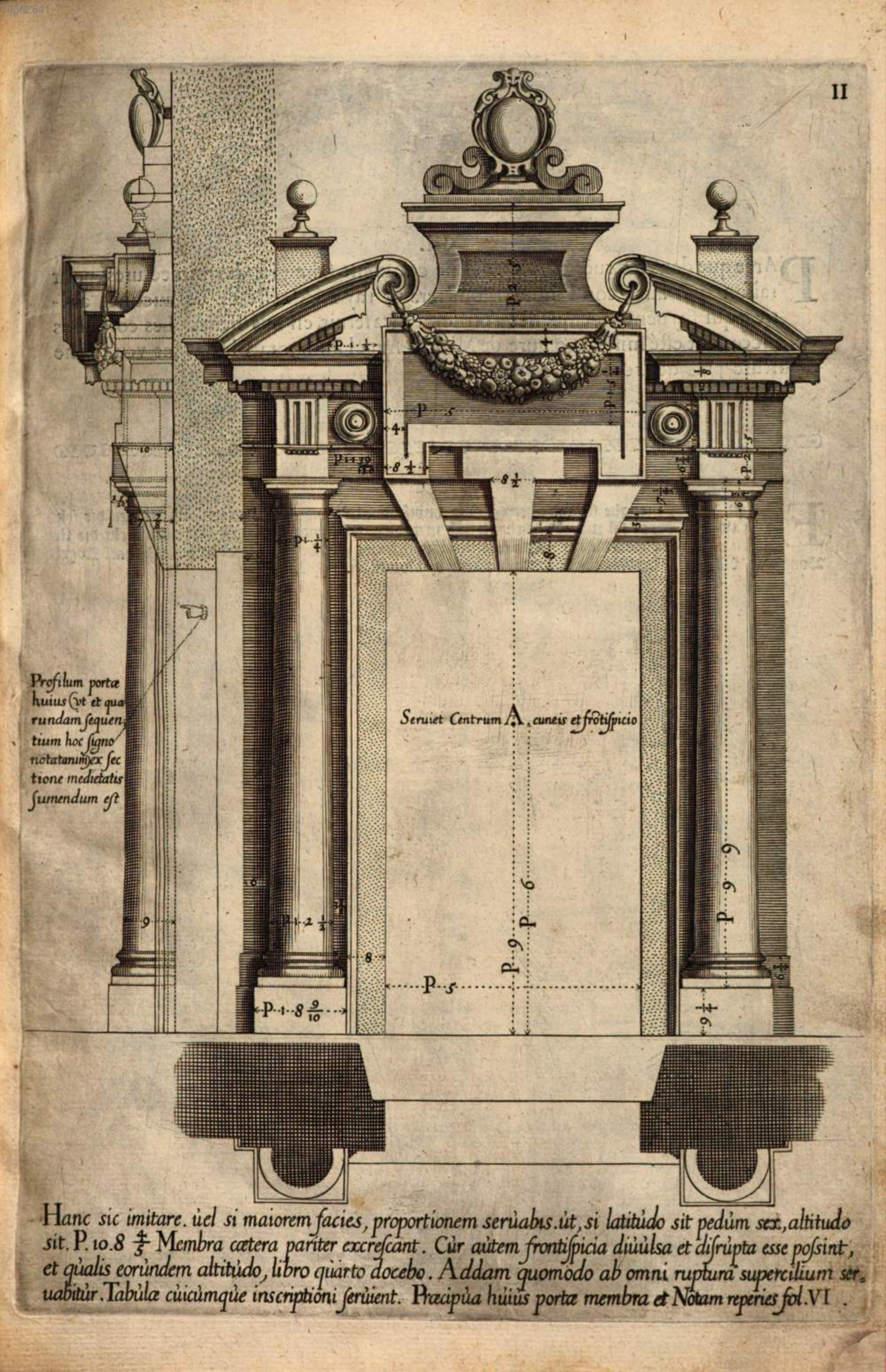
Plate II of the Premier livre d'architecture

He never married and died in Brussels where he was buried on 6 January 1651.

== Work ==
=== General ===
Franquart was a prolific artist who worked as an architect, painter, print designer, draftsman, military engineer and poet. His most important contributions are his publication on contemporary Italian architecture and introduction of the Baroque style in architecture in the Habsburg Netherlands.. He was employed by the court of the Archdukes Albert and Isabella in Brussels as a painter and architect. He was responsible for the design of ephemeral decorations and structure for important occasions at the court such as funerals. As an architect and decorator, he introduced early Baroque into the buildings of the Habsburg Netherlands. Only a few paintings are attributed to him. He was further active as a civil and military engineer.

=== Publications ===
Franquart's Premier Livre d’Architecture was published in 1617 and dedicated to Archduke Albert. Four volumes were planned but only one was ever published. This treatise features an introduction and 18 designs for doors for civil architecture. The designs are illustrated in scale drawings, elevations and in profile with the additions of a few measurements. Three illustrations show additional details. The engravings were made by Michel Lasne. The text was in three languages: Latin, French and Dutch. The book reflects the tradition of Hans Vredeman de Vries' pattern books. It also reflects the influence of van Sebastiano Serlio's Extraordinario Libro. The door designs are all based on designs by Michelangelo and later Mannerist architects. Two types of models are provided in the book: for refined doors and for rustic doors. The importance of door design at that time is that doors were typically the only modern element added to civil buildings whose design remained otherwise traditional. The book introduces the principle of Baroque decorative opulence as well as certain recurring themes, such as the cartouche, the horn of opulence, the sheell three superimposed pods. Like Coberghers unpublished treatise, Franquart's book made a significant contribution to the knowledge of the Italian tradition in the Southern Netherlands.

In 1622, he published in Brussels the Cent tablettes et escussons d'armes or Hondert schryftafelkens ende wapeschilden (One hundred plaques and escutcheons of arms). The book had 27 pages and plates. It was a model book providing examples of portals and gate designs were included to be realised and adapted. The subtitle of the book was pour sculpteurs, peintres et orfebvres, pour s'en servir aux ornemens d'inscriptions, emblemes et armes (for sculptors, painters and goldsmiths, to be used for inscriptions, emblems and coats of arms), showing that the intention of the book was to serve as guidelines for painters, sculptors and goldsmiths.

=== Architectural designs ===
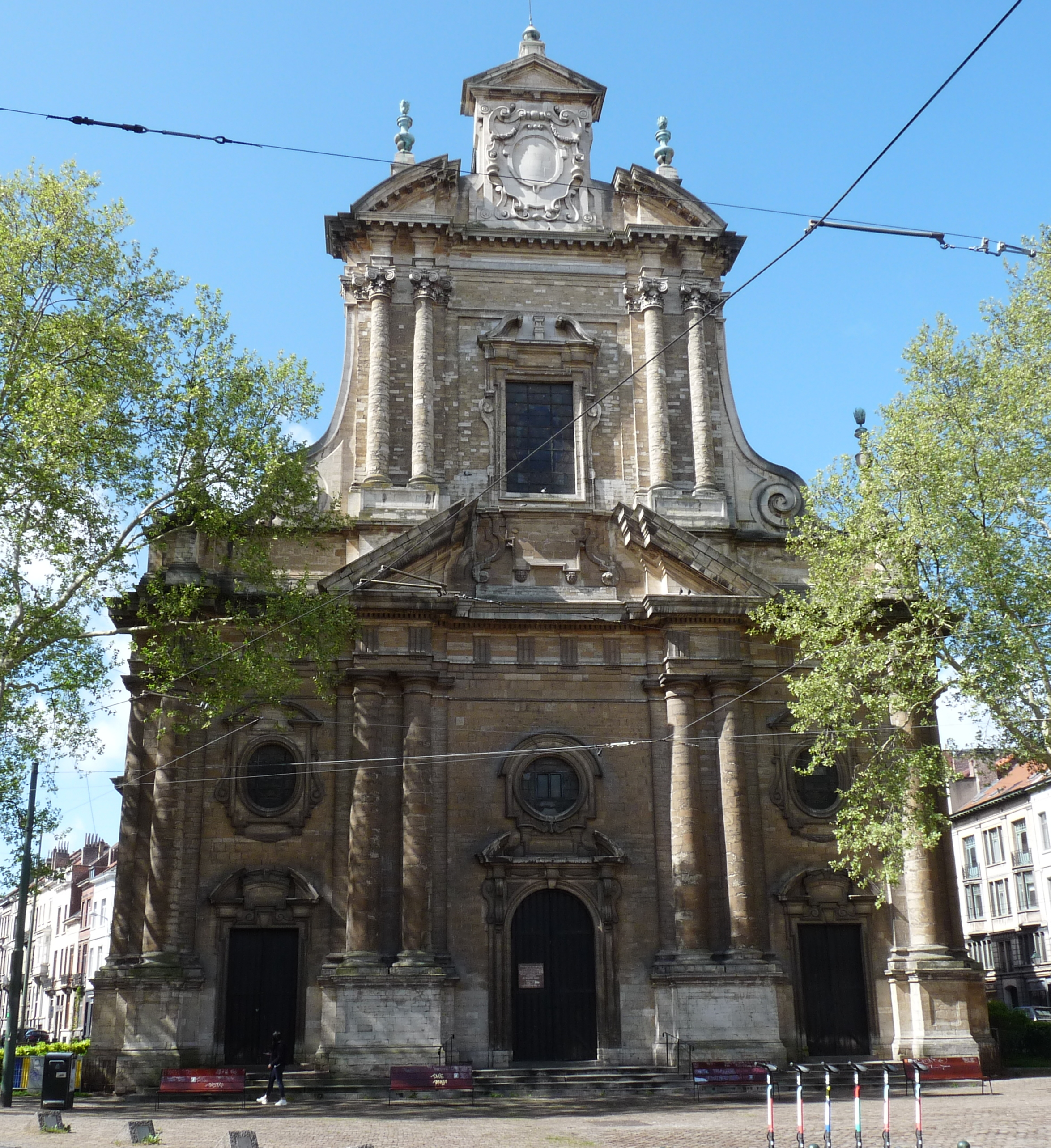
Facade of the Church of the Holy Trinity in Brussels

One month after the publication of his Premier Livre d'Architecture, he was asked to complete the Jesuit Church in Brussels (destroyed in 1812). The church's construction had been started in 1606 with Hendrik Hoeimaker as the building master. His first building design was of great importance both for his own career and for its influence on his contemporaries. His Jesuit Church played a key role in the evolution of the Flemish early Baroque even more so than the contemporary St. Charles Borromeo Church in Antwerp, which was designed by Franciscus Aguilonius and Peter Huyssens. His Baroque church shows the influence of his Roman models. The primary Roman models include the Church of St. Susanna by Carlo Maderno, the designs of Giacomo Barozzi da Vignola for the Jesuit Church which were not executed and the facade of the Jesuit Church which were built by Giacomo della Porta in 1577. Franquart's sole original contribution to these models is the addition of an attic (a story above the cornice of the facade), which adds an extra dimension to the facade, while not entirely breaking with the horizantality of Renaissance architecture. Franquart's Jesuit Church also incorporated local traditions as the facade hid a Flemish Late Gothic building (in part inherited from Hoeimaker's original design) characterised by its verticalism and interior rib-vaulting. Tuscan columns carried the rib-vaults, decorated in the centre by escutcheons, a treatment of the nave that was echoed by many, including Huyssens at St. Walburga Church in Bruges.

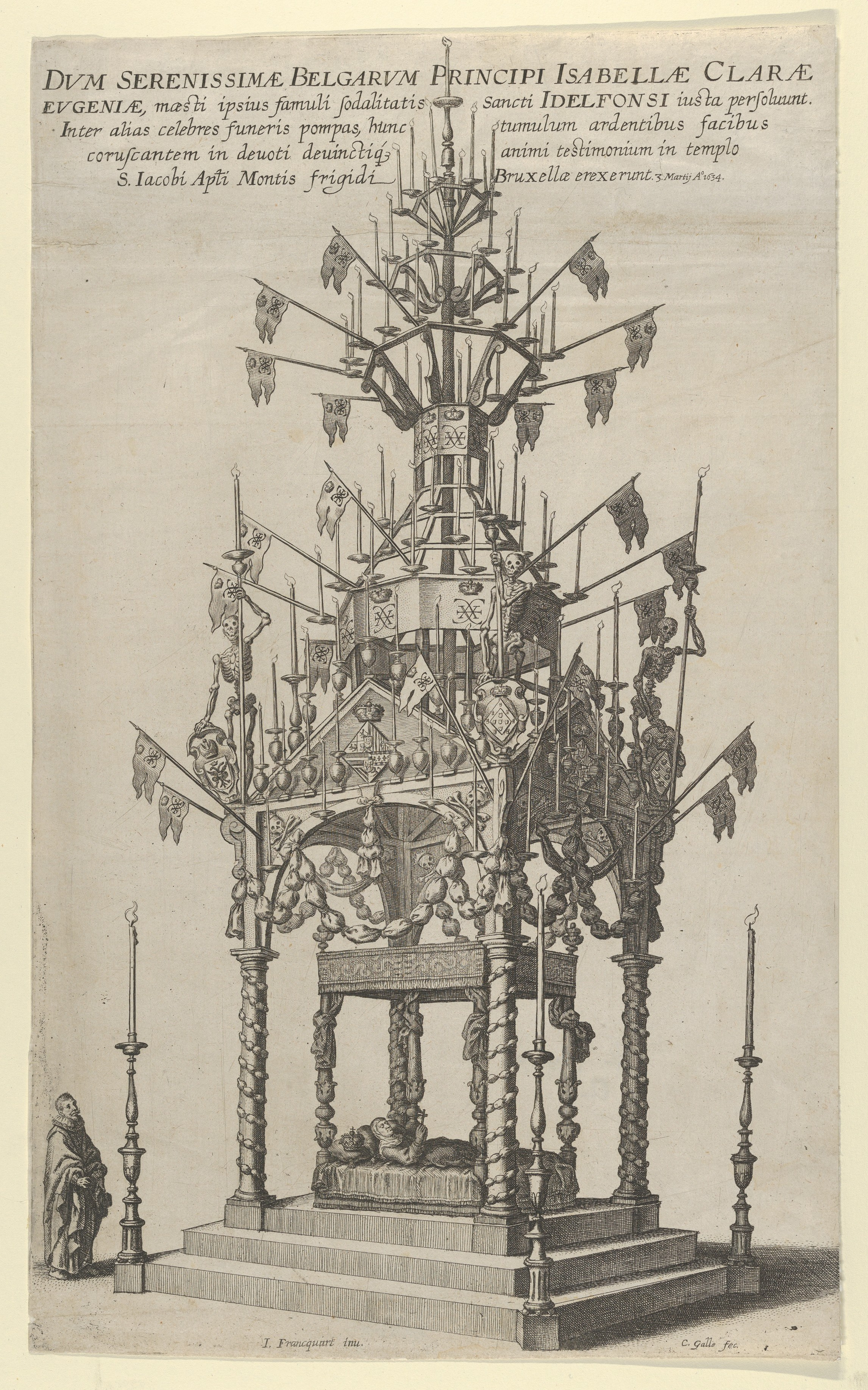
Catafalque for Isabella Clara

In 1620, Franquart designed the Temple of the Augustinians, which stood on the present-day Place de Brouckère/De Brouckèreplein in central Brussels, from its completion in 1642 until its demolition in 1893–94. The reconstructed facade of the building now forms part of the Church of the Holy Trinity on the Parvis de la Trinité/Drievuldigheidsvoorplein in the Brussels municipality of Ixelles. Various elements of his design, including the use of consecutive double columns, broken frontons and boldly decorated light-openings in various shapes, established a new architectural style that became known as Brabantine Baroque. He used a comparable design for the facade of the Beguinage Church in Mechelen, started in 1629 and completed around 1645 by the architect Lucas Faydherbe. The front facade, which he copied in the Church of the Holy Trinity in Brussels, is similar to the Jesuit Church and to Cobergher's Augustine Church in Antwerp. Faydherbe was also inspired by this facade in his design for the Basilica of Our Lady of Hanswijk in Mechelen. The interior of which is characterised by the round-arched arcades with Corinthian pilasters supporting an entablature, as in the Our Lady of St. Peter's Church in Ghent designed by Huyssens. Franquart contributed to the extension of the Church of Our Lady by the Dijle in Mechelen, by adding a choir chapel and two side chapels as a continuation of the 16th-century choir (executed from 1642 to 1652). Through these designs, Franquart was, together with Cobergher, Aguilonius and Huyssens, one of the foremost church architects in the Southern Netherlands in the early 17th century, by pioneering the introduction and dissemination of the Roman early Baroque style. His style, sometimes referred to as the Italo-Flemish style, became very popular in Flanders in the 17th century.

=== Ephemeral designs ===
As a leading court artist, Franquart was often tasked with designing ephemeral decorations and structures for important occasions at the court. He designed the various decorations and monumental, ephemeral architecture and structures for the funeral of Archduke Albert held in the Church of St. Michael and St. Gudula (now Brussels' cathedral) on 12 March 1622.

Franquart designed the catafalque below which the body of the Archduchess Isabella Clara was laid in the Church of St. James on Coudenberg in Brussels during her funeral ceremony on 3 March 1634. A print of the catafalque made by Cornelis Galle the Elder shows the body of the Archduchess in the habit of the Poor Clares laid out in a four-poster bed, her crown beside her on the pillow. The catafalque is richly decorated with lit candles and flags with Isabella's monogram.

Franquart also designed the festive architecture in honour of the Joyous Entry into Ghent on 26 January 1635 of the Governor of the Habsburg Netherlands Cardinal-Infante Ferdinand of Austria. He was invited to do so by the local magistrates of Ghent. The event itself was organised by the Jesuit College which provided research into emblems, allegories and classical Humanism to build the image of the Cardinal-Infante Ferdinand of Austria and to link him to Emperor Charles V, who was born in Ghent. Francart designed two triumphal arches, respectively of Emperor Charles V and the Cardinal-Infant Ferdinand that took into account this research. The arches were erected on the Friday Market. The arches were not built under the supervision of Franquart, but under that of engineer Melchior de Somer and master Pieter Plumion. The Joyous Entry was described in detail in the book Serenissimi Principis Ferdinandi Hispaniarum Infantis S.R.E. Cardinalis Triumphalis introitus in Flandriae Metropolim Gandavum written by the Jesuit Willem van der Beke (Guilielmus Becanus). It was printed in Antwerp in 1636 by the printing press of Jan van Meurs.

=== Print designs ===
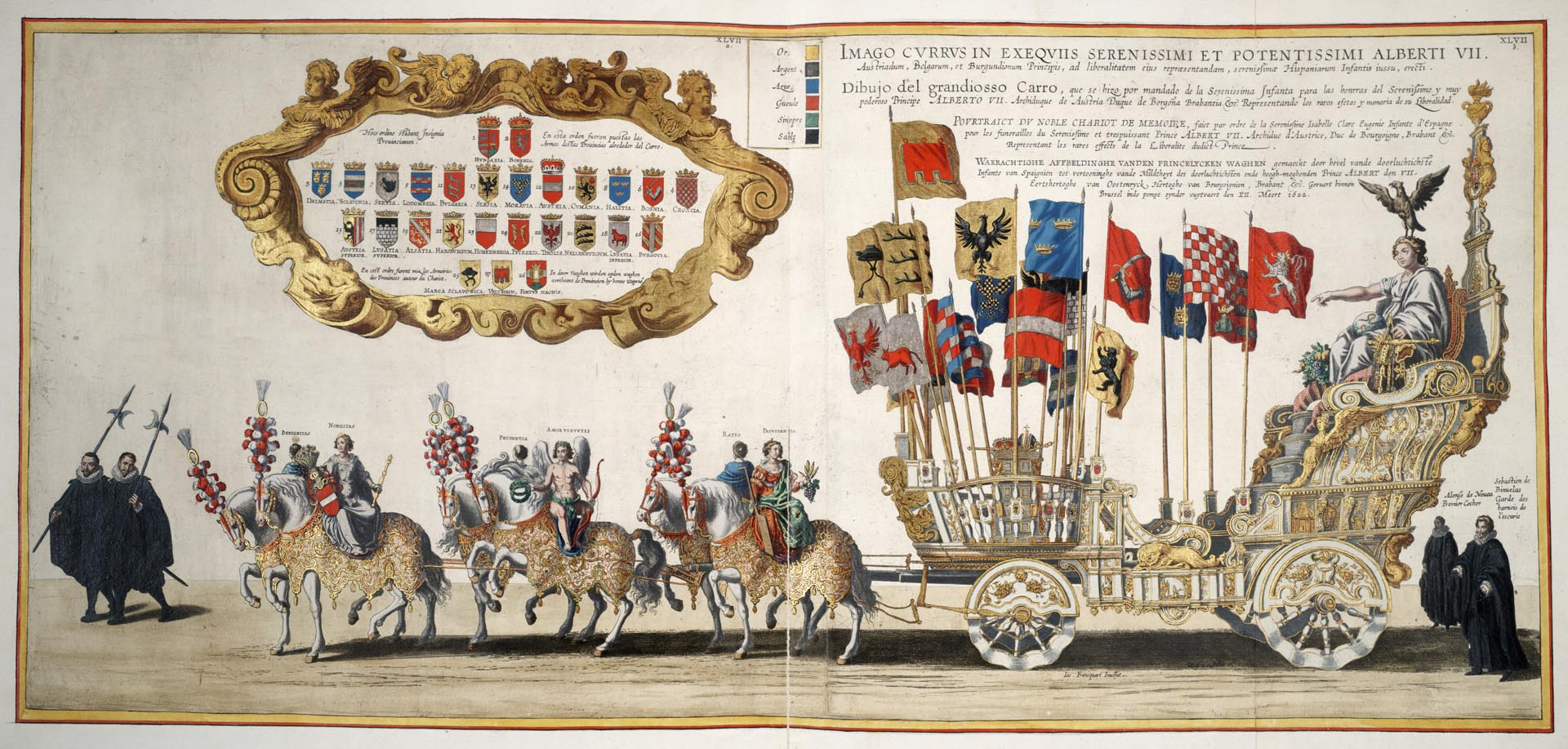
Funeral procession for Albert VII, Archduke of Austria

Franquart designed the illustrations for a book commemorating the funeral ceremony of Archduke Albert held in the Church of St. Michael and St. Gudula in Brussels on 12 March 1622. The title of the book is Pompa funebris optimi potentissimiq[ue] principis Alberti Pii, Archiducis Austriae, ducis Burg. Bra. &c. While the work was published in Brussels at the Jan Mommaert press, the copper engravings were cut by Antwerp's eminent printmaker Cornelis Galle the Elder. It is therefore generally regarded as one of the eminent works of the golden age of Antwerp copperplate engraving. The text was principally derived from the book Phoenix Principum... written by the Dutch writer and historian Erycius Puteanus and published in Leuven in 1622. The engravings use a hatching table of heraldic tinctures which is the earliest hatching system in heraldry after Zangrius. According to some authors it was the inspiration for the later hatching system of de la Colombière. The engravings in the book present the 1621 funeral procession in 64 tables. The total length of the print is close to 1 meter. It depicts more than 700 different persons with the banner of their countries. It also has depictions of monumental, ephemeral architecture that was designed for the funeral by Franquart himself. The volume is an important record of the role of ephemeral architecture in courtly ceremonies in this period in Europe.

He collaborated on a collection of biographies of prominent members of the Augustinian order published by Antwerp printer Joannes Cnobbaert under the title Virorum illustrium ex ordine eremitarum D. Augustini elogia : cum singulorvm expressis ad viuum iconibus. Written by the Augustinian friar Cornelis Curtius, it contained biographies and short-title listings of the works of prominent Augustians. It was illustrated with 30 full-page portraits engraved by Cornelius Galle after designs by Franquart. The frames in which the portraits of the Augustines depicted constitute a further development of the door, plaque and escutcheon designs from his design publications.

== Paintings ==
In 1611, Franquart received his first painting commission for the convent of the Discalced Carmelites in Brussels. The painting is lost. In 1613, Franquart was appointed court painter to the Brussels court. In the 1620s, Archdukes Albert and Isabella commissioned Franquart, Rubens, Cobergher, Salomon de Claus and Jérôme Duquesnoy the Younger to decorate their palace in Brussels. Franquart mainly worked on the old and new oratories of the Archduchess and the finishing and detailing of the palace. Between 1612 and 1614, he created ceiling paintings in the first oratory and also restored its older scenes. He was also responsible for other decorative commissions at the court.
