= Brussels Carmel =

Discalced Carmelite convent in Brussels

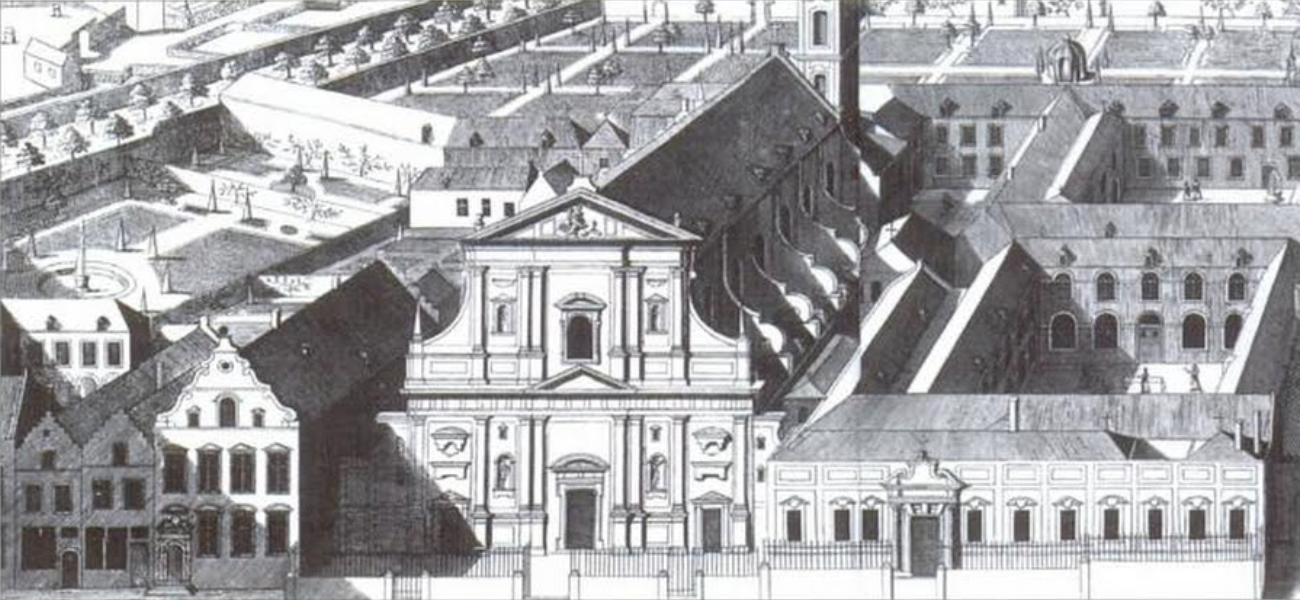
- A print of the Carmel from Antoon Sanders, Chorographia sacra Brabantiae, vol. 2 (Brussels, 1663).

Monastery information
- Order: Discalced Carmelites
- Established: 1607
- Disestablished: 1785
- Diocese: Mechelen

Architecture
- Status: Demolished
- Architect: Wenceslas Cobergher
- Style: Baroque

The Brussels Carmel was a Discalced Carmelite convent in the City of Brussels, founded in 1607 by Ana de Jesús at the behest of the Archdukes Albert and Isabella. The church and convent were designed by Wenceslas Cobergher in an Italianate style inspired by the Roman church of Santa Maria in Traspontina. The monastery was suppressed in 1785.
