= Les Moëres =

Coordinates: 51°2′N 2°34′E

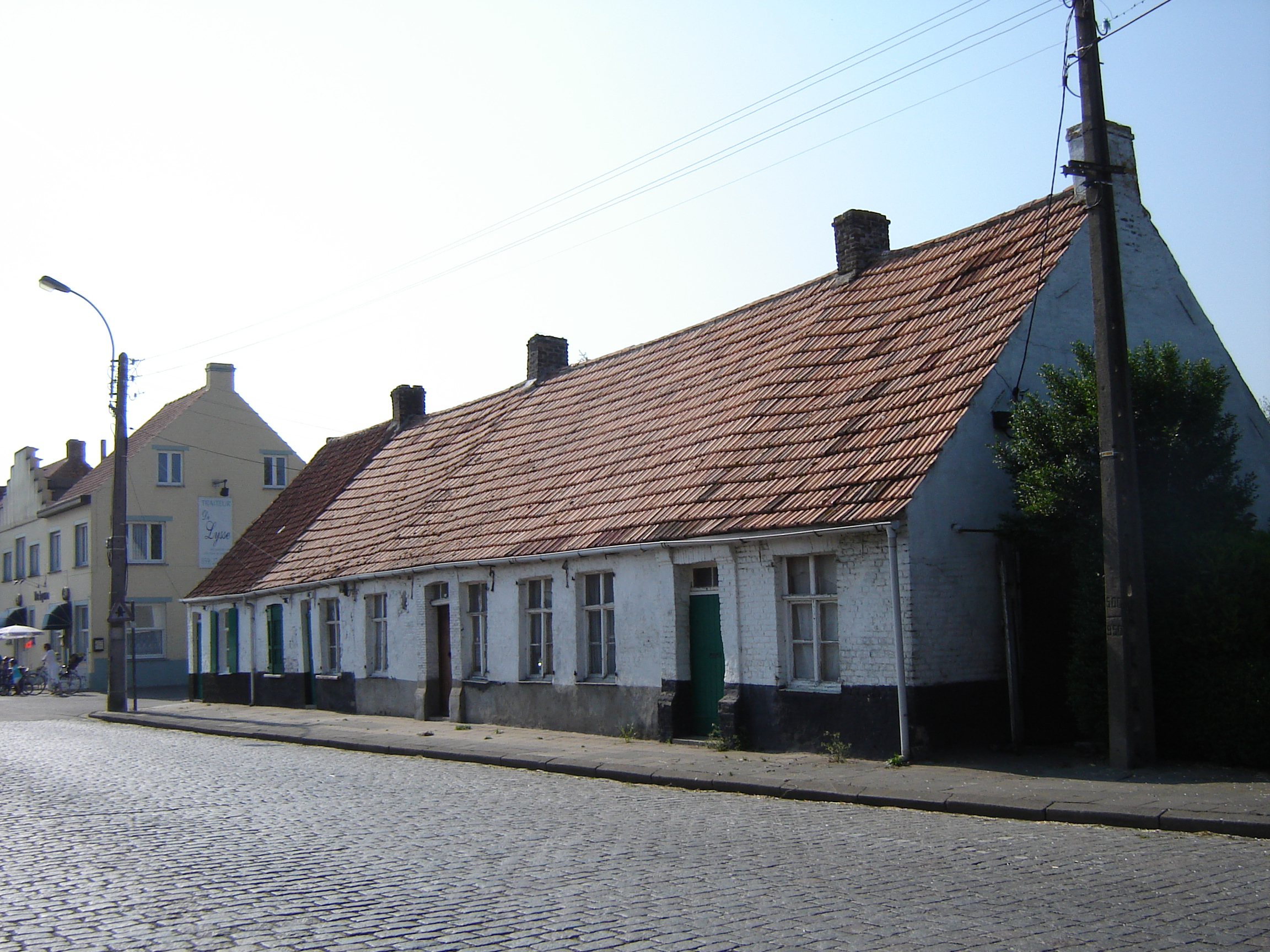
Traditional house of the 19th century

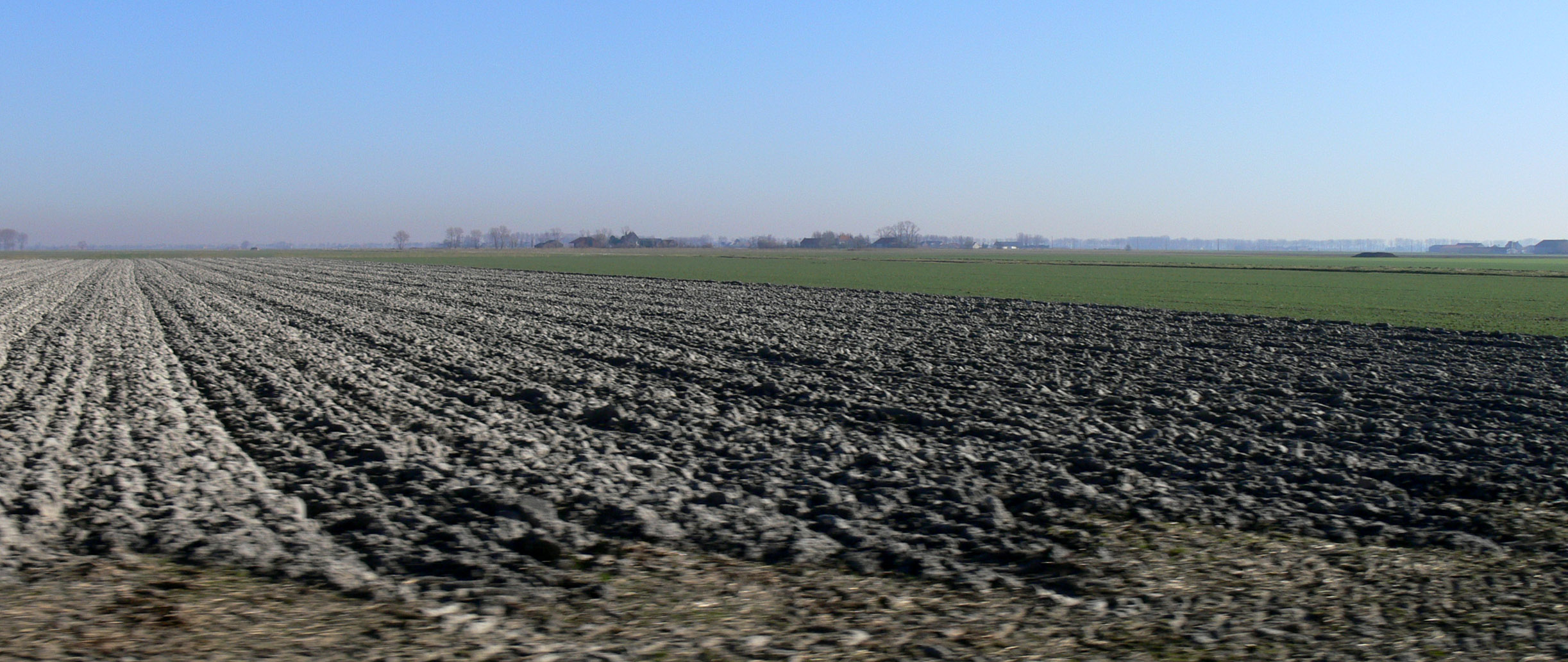
Typical landscape of the Moëres

De Moeren (Dutch) or Les Moëres (French) are a marshy region in the Westhoek, politically divided between the French-Belgian border. At one time the area was inhabited by the Gallic people known as the Morini; they are believed to have lent their name to the territory.

For many centuries, beginning around 800, the marshes were completely submerged due to a slight elevation of the nearby sea; beginning in 1617 the area was drained by Wenceslas Cobergher on the orders of Albert VII, Archduke of Austria and his wife, Isabella. The project was finished in 1627, leaving the marshes around 2.5 meters below sea level.

With the Treaty of Utrecht in 1713, De Moeren were divided between France and the Habsburg monarchy. Today, two communes share the territory and its name:

- Les Moëres, Nord, which contains a museum of water pumps
- De Moeren, Veurne, Belgium
