= Jacob Franckaert the Elder =

Flemish painter

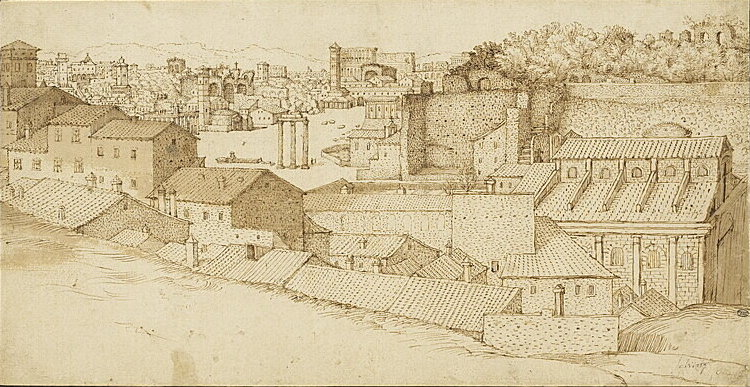
View of Rome

Jacob Franckaert or Jacob Franquart (the Elder) (1550–51 – 6 September 1601 (buried)) was a Flemish painter and draftsman. After training in Antwerp, he worked in Brussels and later moved to Italy where he worked in Naples and Rome. He is known for his religious subjects, landscapes and architectural scenes.

== Life ==
Franckaert was born in Antwerp in 1550 or 1551. It is not known with whom he studied. He became a master in the Antwerp Guild of Saint Luke in 1571. He married Michaela del Tronco. A son, also called Jacob was born in 1582 or 1583 and a daughter named Suzanna was born around 1584. Jacob the Elder was still recorded as a master painter at the Antwerp Guild of Saint Luke in 1585.

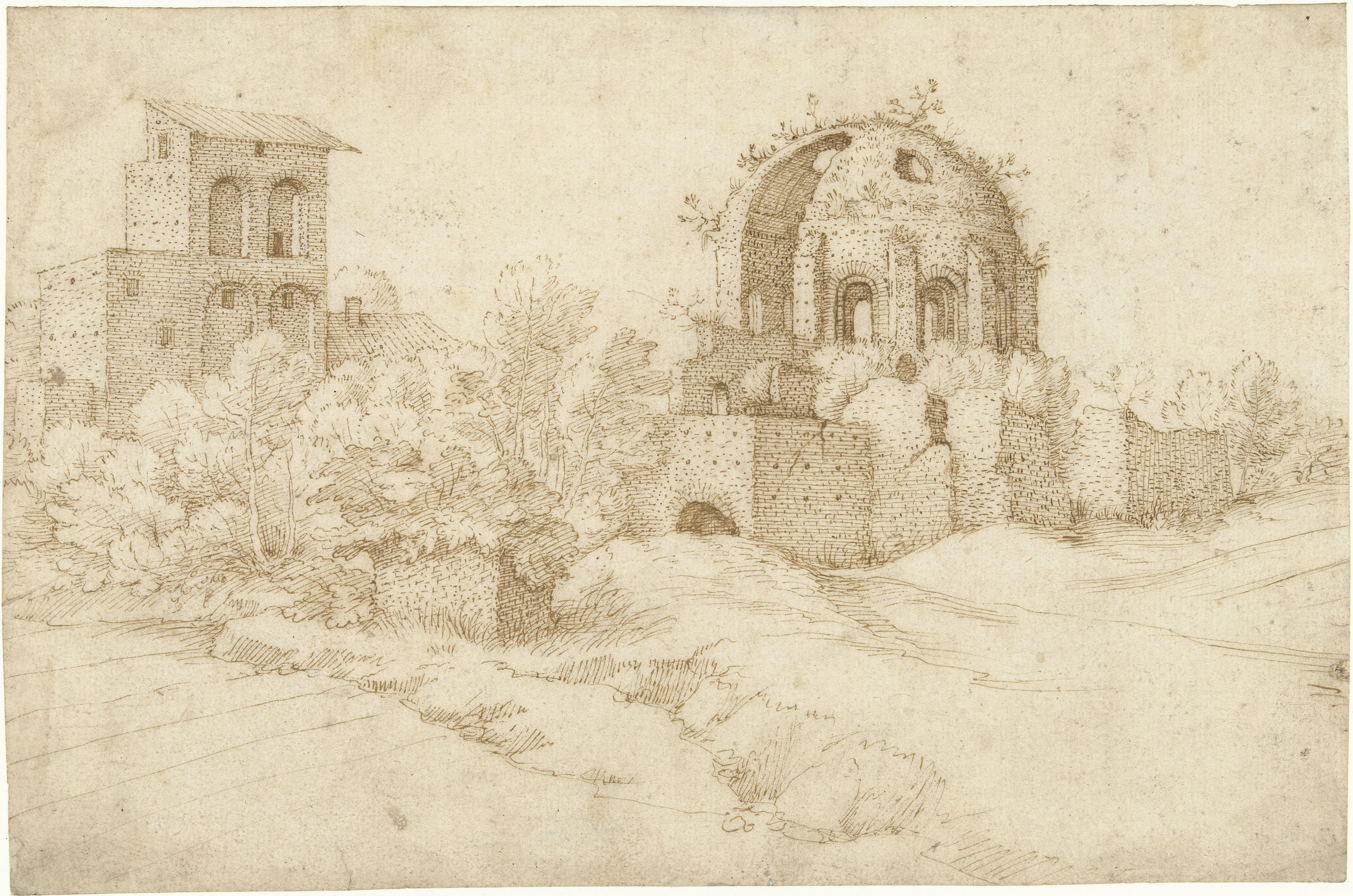
View of the Temple of Minerva Medica

He travelled with his family via Paris to Italy in 1591. In Naples he started a collaboration with Wenceslas Cobergher, a Flemish painter who had trained in Antwerp with the leading history painter Maerten de Vos. They executed several paintings for the city's churches. It is difficult to discern in these works the contribution of either artist.

Jacob the Elder moved with his family to Rome in 1594. Cobergher joined them and the two artists continued their collaboration. Four months after the death of his first wife, Cobergher married Jacob's daughter Suzanna in Rome on 20 November 1599. At the time the Franckaert family was registered in the register of the parish of San Lorenzo in Rome and they were still registered there in March 1601. Jacob the elder was likely the teacher of his son Jacob the younger.

Jacob died on 6 September 1601 in Rome. His widow died not long after. Their son Jacob the younger then went to live with his sister Susanna and her husband Cobergher.

== Work ==
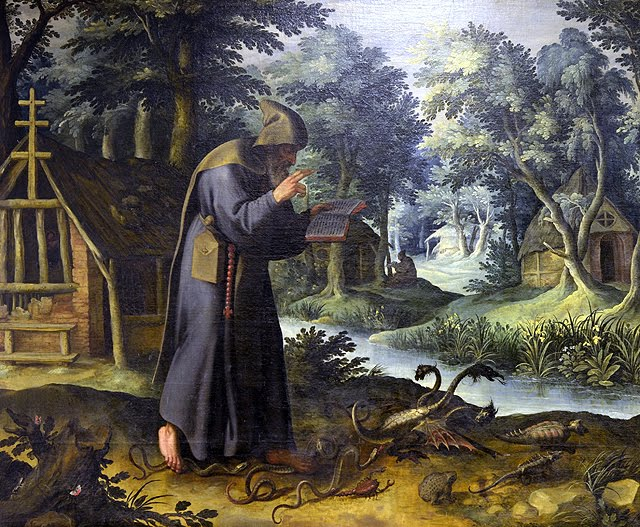
Didymus the Blind, one of the paintings of hermits

Franckaert painted and drew religious subjects, landscapes and architectural scenes. He collaborated on various paintings with Cobergher. He is now mainly known for a small number of landscape and architectural drawings. The only known signed drawing is The Temple of Minerva Medica and other ruins on the Esquiline, Rome in the collection of the Vatican, which is signed 'Van Franckaert'. This drawing has served as the basis of attributions of other drawings of Roman views in the Berlin Kunstbibliothek, the Louvre and the Rijksmuseum.

On 23 February 1601 Franckaert together with three other Flemish painters working in Rome entered into a contract with the Spanish noble Don Pietro di Toledo, fifth marquis of Villafranca for the execution of ninety paintings of hermits at the price of 15 escudos per piece and 400 paintings of Roman emperors and other prominent figures of Antiquity. The other Flemish painters were Paul Bril, a prominent landscape painter, the rather obscure landscape artist Willem van Nieulandt the Elder (then a pupil of Bril) and Franckaert's son-in-law and collaborator Cobergher. Under the contract Cobergher was in charge of the largest portion of the hermit paintings and all of the paintings of Roman emperors and other prominent figures of Antiquity. Thirty of the paintings of hermits are now in the collection of the Monastery of the Anunciada in Villafranca del Bierzo. These works were partially based on prints after designs by the Flemish artist Maerten de Vos. The contribution of each of the artists in the paintings cannot be determined with certainty.
