= Isaac Bullart =

French author and banker (1599 - 1672)

Isaac Bullart (1599–1672) was a French-language author and banker from the Low Countries.

== Life ==
Bullart was born in Rotterdam, in the Dutch Republic, but at the age of 11 was sent to the Jesuit college in Bordeaux for his education. After returning to the Low Countries he lived first in Brussels and later in Arras, where he was appointed director of the Mount of piety. He was married to the painter Anna Francisca de Bruyns. His biographical dictionary of scholars and artists, Académie des sciences et des arts, was edited for posthumous publication by his son, Jacques-Ignace Bullart.

== Publications ==
- Académie des sciences et des arts, contenant les vies, & les éloges historiques des hommes illustres, qui ont excellé en ces professions depuis environ quatre siècles parmy diverses nations de l'Europe (2 vols, published at the author's expense, 1682; to be sold in Brussels by François Foppens and in Amsterdam by the heirs of Daniel Elsevier)
