= Wenceslas Cobergher =

Flemish Renaissance architect, artist, and economist

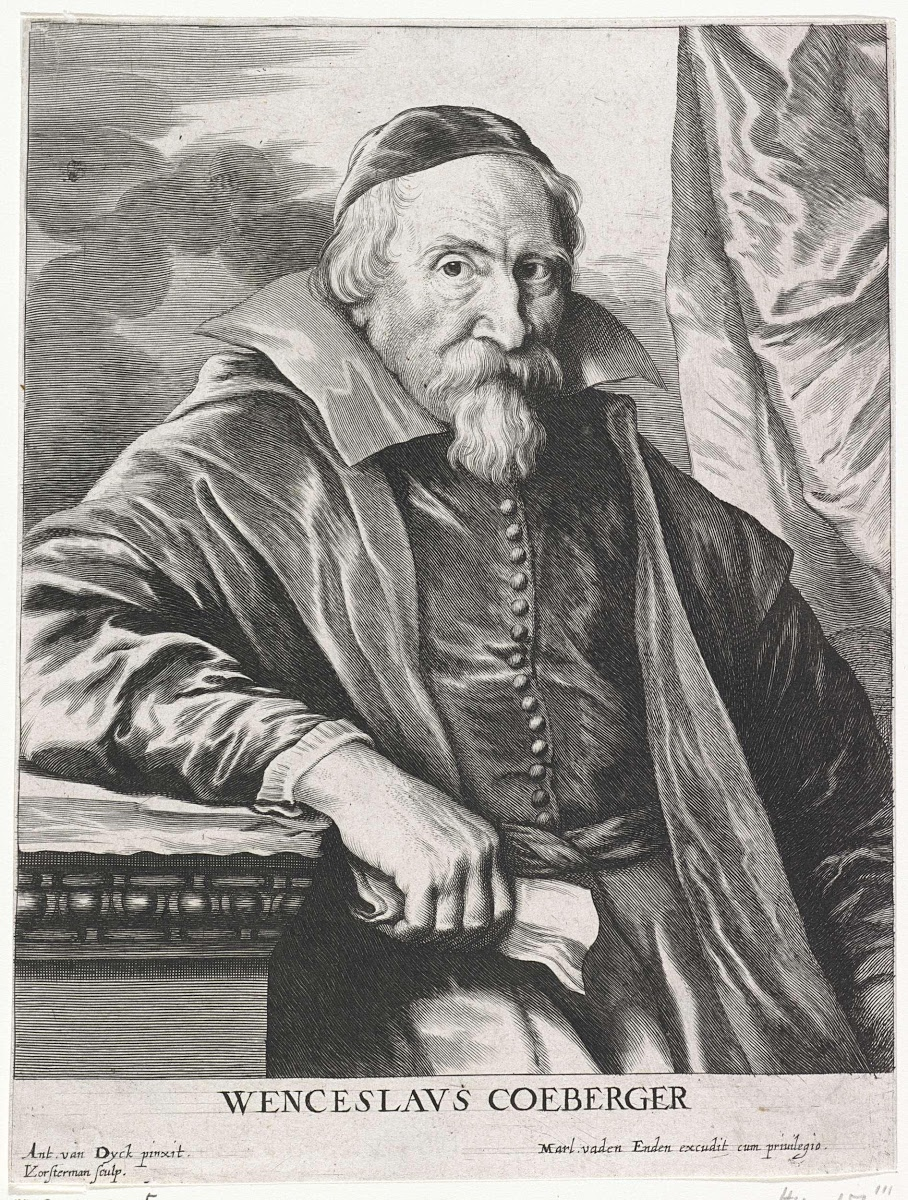
- Portrait of Wenceslas Cobergher
- Born: 1560 ? Antwerp, Flanders
- Died: 23 November 1634; Brussels
- Spouses: Michaela Cerf; Suzanna Frankaert
- Children: nine
- Parent(s): Wenceslas Coeberger; Catharina Raems
- Engineering career
- Discipline: Civil engineer Painter; Architect; Economist
- Practice name: Maestro Vincenzo
- Projects: Basilica of Scherpenheuvel, Belgium Draining of the Moëres

Wenceslas Cobergher (1560 – 23 November 1634), sometimes called Wenzel Coebergher, was a Flemish Renaissance architect, engineer, painter, antiquarian, numismatist and economist. Faded somewhat into the background as a painter, he is chiefly remembered today as the man responsible for the draining of the Moëres on the Franco-Belgian border. He is also one of the fathers of the Flemish Baroque style of architecture in the Southern Netherlands.

== Life ==
Born in Antwerp, probably in 1560 (1557, according to one source), he was a natural child of Wenceslas Coeberger and Catharina Raems, which was attested by deed in May 1579. His name is also written as Wenceslaus, Wensel or Wenzel; his surname is sometimes recorded as Coberger, Cobergher, Coebergher, and Koeberger.

== Painter ==
Cobergher began his career as a painter and an architect. In 1573 he started his studies in Antwerp as an apprentice to the painter Marten de Vos. Following the example of his master, Cobergher left for Italy in 1579, trying to fulfil the dream of every artist to study Italian art and culture. On his way there he stayed briefly in Paris, where he learned about his illegitimate birth from seeing the will of his deceased mother. He returned to Antwerp right away to settle some legal matters relating to this discovery. Later in the year, he set forth again to Italy. He settled in Naples in 1580 (as attested by a contract) and remained there till 1597.

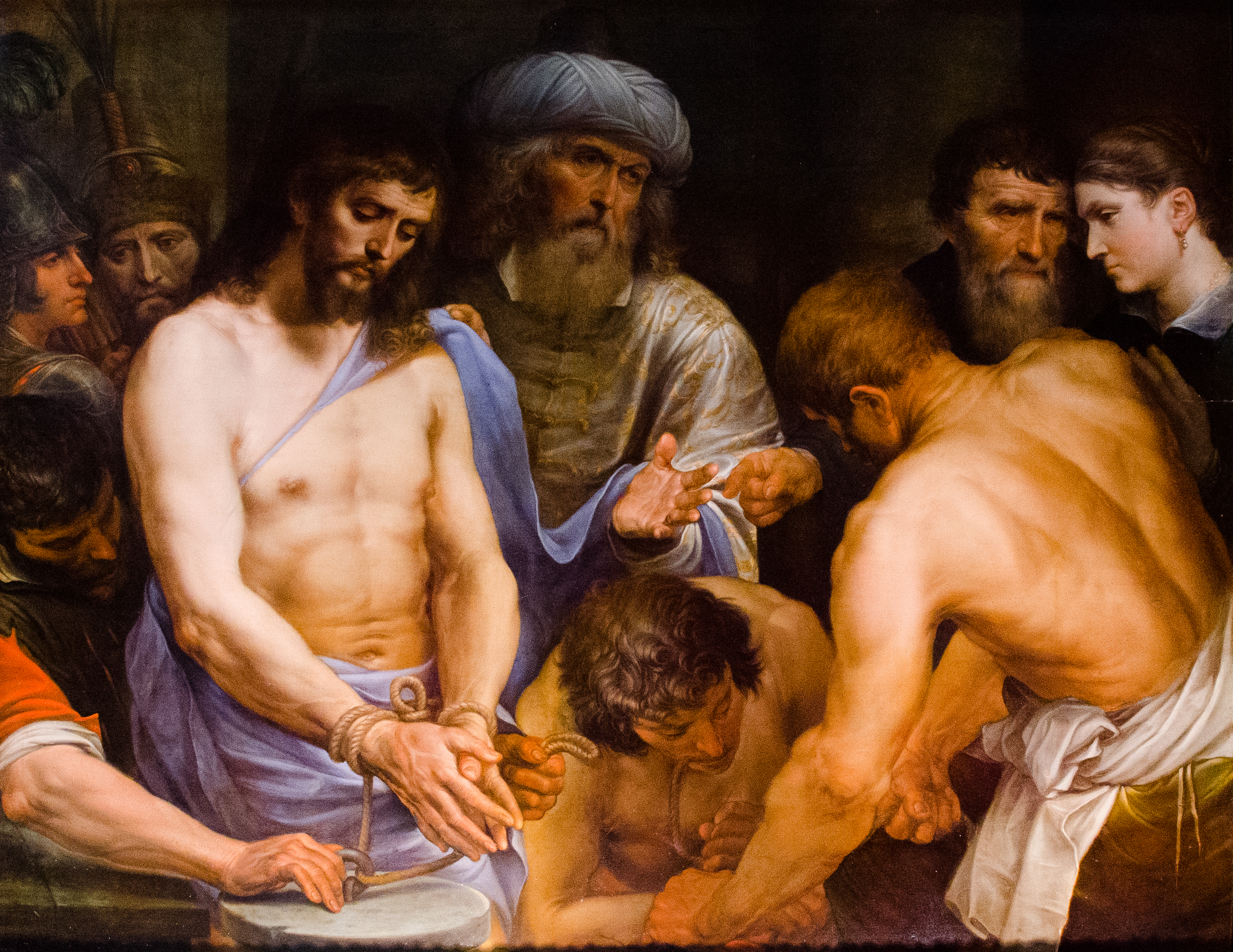
Ecce Homo

In Naples he worked under contract for eight ducats together with the Flemish painter and art dealer Cornelis de Smet. He returned briefly to Antwerp in 1583, buying goods with borrowed money for his second trip to Italy. He is mentioned again in Naples in 1588. In 1591 he allied himself with another compatriot, the painter Jacob Franckaert the Elder (before 1551–1601).

He moved to Rome in 1597 (as attested in a letter to Peter Paul Rubens by Jacques Cools). During that time he had also been preparing a numismatic book in the tradition of Hendrik Goltzius. He must also have built up a reputation as an art connoisseur, since in 1598 he was asked to make an inventory and set a value on the paintings of the deceased cardinal Bonelli.

After the death of his first wife, Michaela Cerf, on 7 July 1599, he married again, four months later and at the age of forty; his second wife was Suzanna Franckaert, 15-year-old daughter of Jacob Franckaert the Elder, who was also active in Rome. He would have nine children with his second wife, while his first marriage had remained childless.

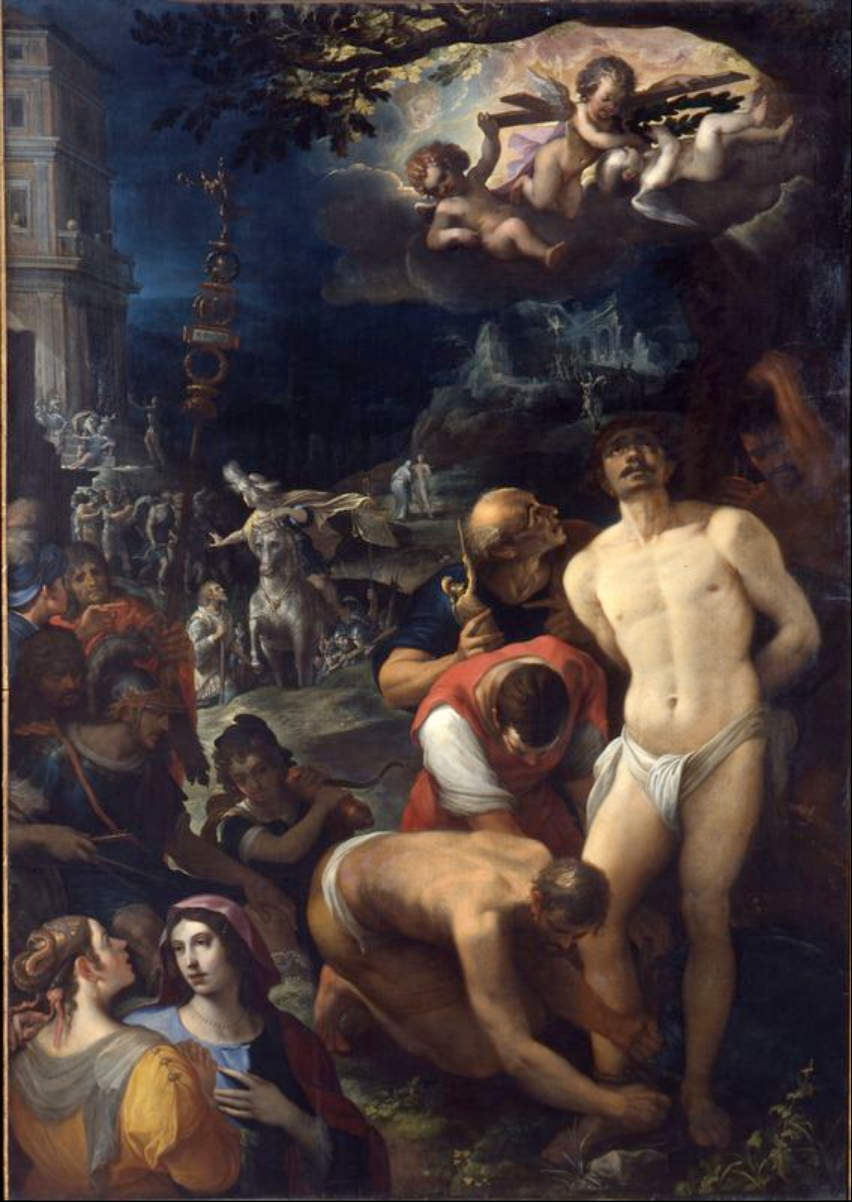
Preparations for the martyrdom of St Sebastian (1599)

During his stay in Rome, Cobergher became much interested in the study of Roman antiquities, antique architecture and statuary. He was also much interested in the way in which Romans represented their gods in paintings, bronze and marble statues, bas-reliefs and on antique coins. He gathered an important collection of coins and medals from the Roman emperors. These drawings and descriptions were gathered in a set of manuscripts, two of which survive (Brussels, Royal Library of Belgium). He was also preparing an anthology of the Roman Antiquity (according to the French humanist Nicolas-Claude Fabri de Peiresc) that was never published. Sometimes the "Tractatus de pictura antiqua" (published in Mantua, 1591) has been ascribed to Cobergher, but this was based on an erroneous reading of an 18th-century catalogue.

At the same time he was witness to the completion of the dome of St. Peter's Basilica in 1590. The architecture of several Roman churches made also a deep impression on him; among them most influential were the first truly baroque façade of the Church of the Gesù, Santa Maria in Transpontina and Santa Maria in Vallicella. He would use their design in his later constructions.

During his stay in Italy he painted, under the name "maestro Vincenzo", a number of altarpieces and other works for important churches in Naples and Rome. His style is somewhat mixed, incorporating Classical and Mannerist elements. His composition is rational and his rendering of the human anatomy is correct. A few of his altarpieces still survive: a Resurrection (San Domenico Maggiore, Naples), a Crucifixion (Santa Maria di Piedigrotta, Naples), a Birth of Christ (S Sebastiana) and a Holy Spirit (Santa Maria in Vallicella, Rome). One of his best known paintings is the Martyrdom of Saint Sebastian, originally in the Cathedral of Our Lady (Antwerp), but now in the Musée des Beaux-Arts in Nancy. This painting was commissioned by the De Jonge Handboog (archers guild) of Antwerp in 1598, while Cobergher was still in Rome. His Angels Supporting the Dead Lord, originally in the Sint-Antoniuskerk in Antwerp, can now also be found in the Musée des Beaux-Arts in Nancy, while his Ecce Homo is now in the museum of Toulouse.

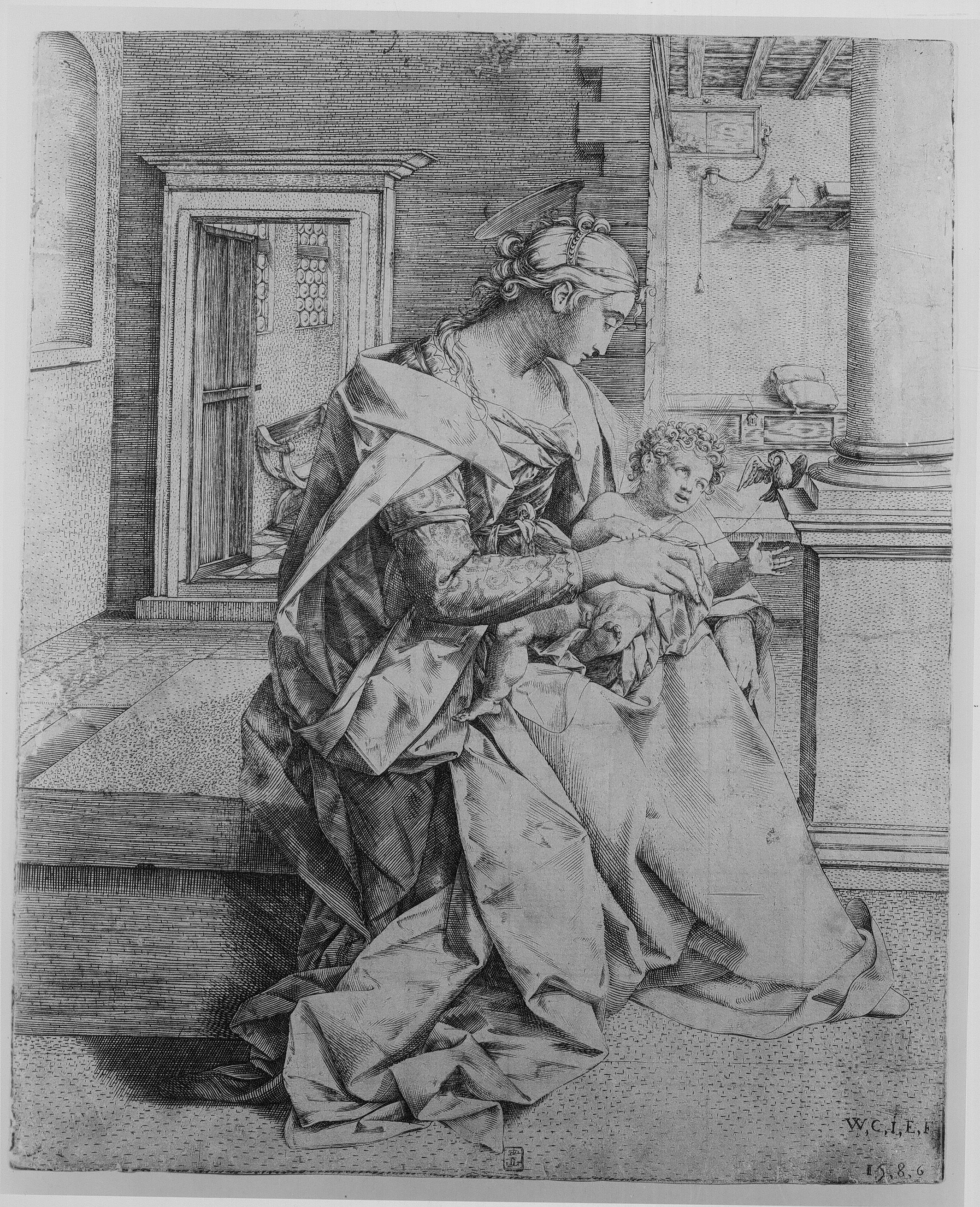
Virgin and Child in an interior (1586)

== Architect ==
Cobergher began his career as an architect in Italy, designing fountains and canals (not confirmed by surviving documents). He is reported to have overseen the construction of palaces and fortifications, but it is not exactly known which ones.

His renown as an architect even reached the court of the Archduke Albert and Infanta Isabella, governors of the Southern Netherlands. In 1601 he was invited to Brussels to present himself at the court, arriving in September of that year. When his in-laws died in 1603, he had to return to Rome to settle family matters. On his return in 1604, he brought along a book from Cardinal Baronius for the printshop of Christoffel Plantijn. He settled in Antwerp where he was admitted as a master in the Guild of Saint Luke. In 1605 he was admitted in the Guild of Romanists.

On 12 November 1604, Cobergher was appointed by the archdukes to the post of "architecte et ingeniaire" (architect-engineer). He moved to his final address in the Violetstreet in Brussels, where he would remain till his death. He was obviously more appreciated by the archdukes than were the court painters Peter Paul Rubens or Jan Brueghel the Elder, since his salary amounted to 1,500 guilders (increasing to 1,800 guilders in 1610), while Rubens' salary was only 500 guilders. The archdukes rightly considered him as an "uomo universale" (universal man) who had received a wide knowledge in Italy.

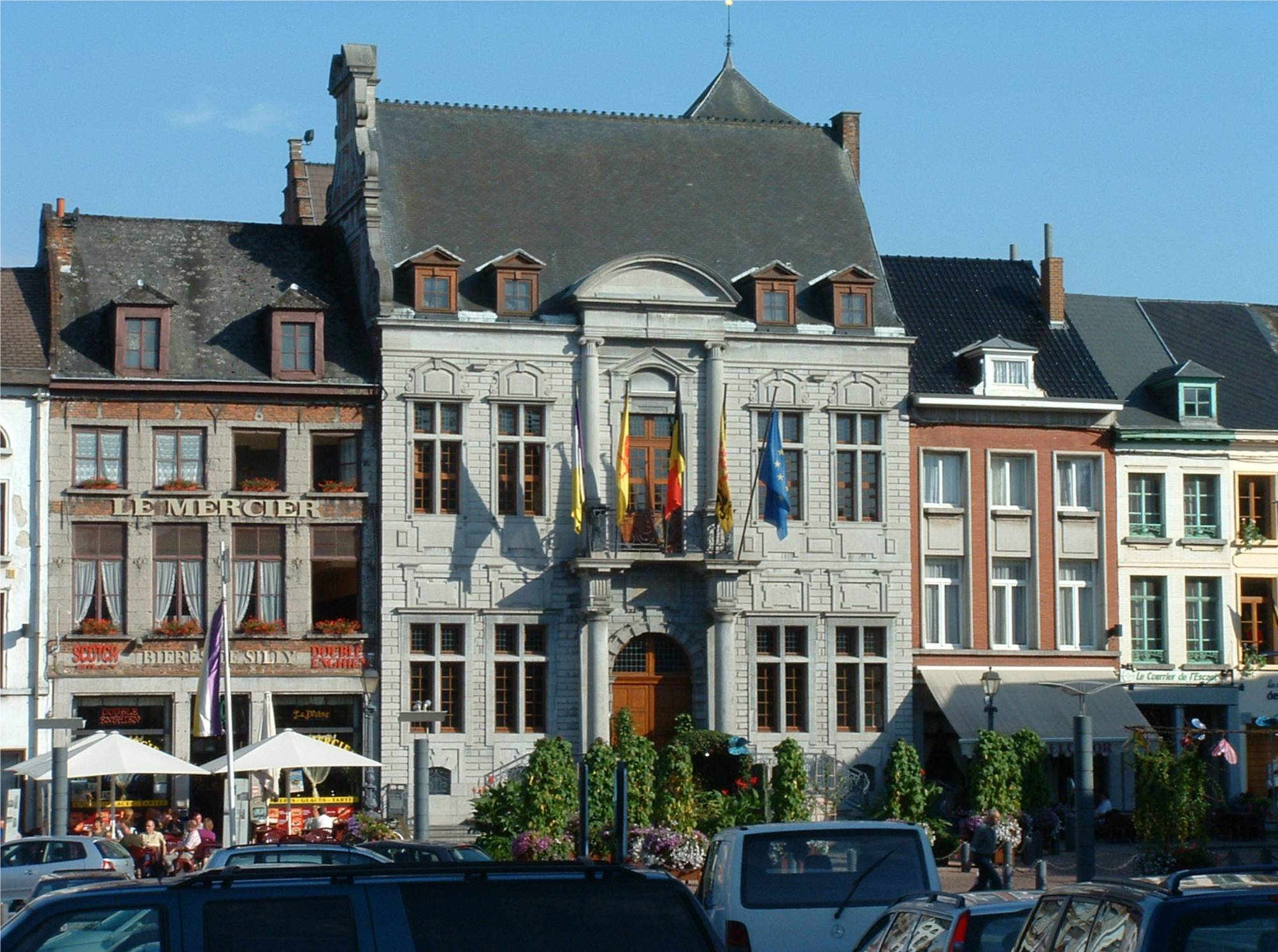
Town hall of Ath

Although from now on he would be mainly active as an architect, he did not abandon painting completely. In 1605 he painted two altarpieces, a Deposition (Brussels, Royal Museums of Fine Arts of Belgium) and St. Helena with the Holy Cross (Saint James' Church, Antwerp).

As an architect, Cobergher promoted the Baroque style in the Southern Netherlands. He started with several alterations at the palace of the archdukes in Brussels and their castles in Tervuren, and worked on their hunting estate in Mariemont. In 1610 he designed, together with the French engineer Salomon de Caus, fountains for the ponds near the archducal palace in Brussels, using the Italian tempietto style. One of his most important commissions was the construction (1607–1611) of the church and the cloister for the Discalced Carmelites in Brussels. The façade of the church was based on the Roman churches of Santa Maria in Transpontina and Church of the Gesu. None of the aforementioned structures survive.

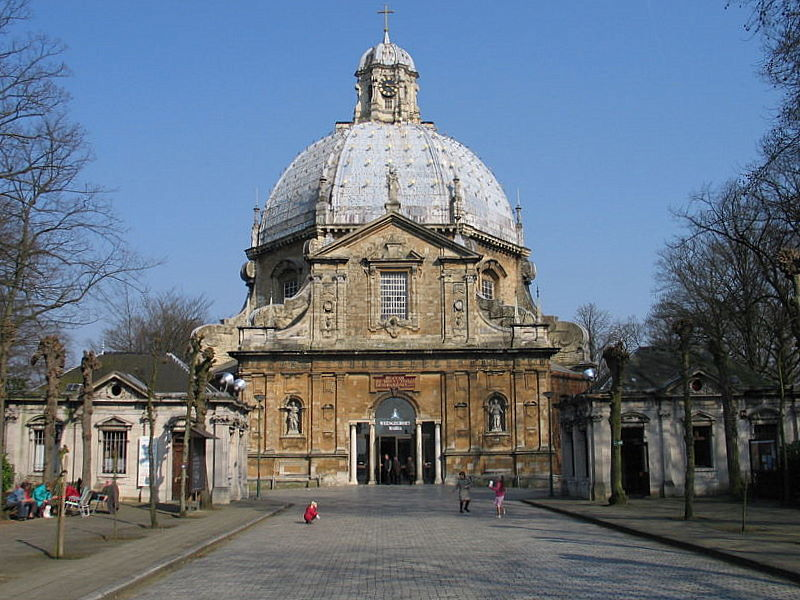
Basilica of Scherpenheuvel

In 1607, Cobergher was ordered to redo a bastion of the Catholic Counter Reformation: the whole city of Scherpenheuvel, in Brabant, was to be redesigned as an allegoric homage to the Mother of God, with a layout based on a 7-pointed star. His first designs for the basilica date from 1606. This pilgrimage church would become his masterpiece. The construction began in 1609 and lasted until about 1624, with the belfry remaining unfinished. The space under the dome is equally heptagonal. This basilica was the first important church with a central dome in the Southern Netherlands.

His later works evolved into his own style, more in harmony with the traditional Northern Renaissance in Flanders, but with additions of early Baroque elements. In 1614 he made the designs for the town hall of Ath, Hainaut (1614–1617) and the church of St. Augustine (1615–1618) in Antwerp (now a concert hall). In 1617 he built in the same mixed style the St. Hubertus chapel for the archducal palace at Tervuren. The volute façade of this chapel was later adopted by other architects, as in the Carmelite Church (Antwerp, 1623; destroyed), St. Barbara Church, Diest (1665–1667), and the Averbode Abbey (1164–1672).

== Economist ==
In 1618 Cobergher was appointed to the rank of General Superintendent of the public pawn shops. As an economist, he was responsible for introducing this concept of public pawnshops to Flanders, after seeing the Monti di Pietà in Italy. He is most probably the author of their set of rules with 500 articles. These pawnshops introduced the modern concept of allowing a credit loan against the deposit of a collateral.

Between 1618 and 1633, he built fifteen Bergen van Barmhartigheid in towns with usurers and Lombard banking. Some of them he designed himself in his mixed style of traditional schemes with Baroque features : Ghent (1622), Tournai (1622, now the Musée d’histoire et d'archéologie), Arras (1624), Lille (1628) and Bergues-Saint-Winock (1633).

Two books about the public pawnshops are ascribed to Cobergher :

- Cort verhaal van de oprechtinghe, ordre ende beleyt van de Bergen van Bermherticheyt (Brussels, 1619) (Short narrative of the true order and policy of the Mounts of Piety)
- Apologia ofte Bescherm-redenen tegen het kekelen van de onredelijcke vyanden, ende oock de tegenraeders, van de Berghen van Bermherticheyt" (Mechelen, Henry Jaye, 1621) (Apology or defence against criticism by the unreasonable enemies and adversaries of the Mounts of Piety)

== Engineer ==
Since 1615 he owned a small company, producing potash. In 1618 he obtained the monopoly for its production in the Spanish Netherlands. This patent was extended in 1627.

Cobergher is perhaps best remembered as a hydraulic engineer. He planned several drainage works in the western and southern parts of the Campine (Dutch: Kempen), a region which then consisted mainly of moor or swamp, heath and sandy peat. In 1616 he made plans for the canalisation of the river Zenne between Brussels and Halle. This last project was only realised in the 19th century.

In 1612, inspired by his observations of the Pontine Marshes southeast of Rome, he composed a report on the draining of Les Moëres (in Dutch : de Moeren), a marshy region of about 3500 ha. in the area between Dunkirk in modern-day France and Veurne in modern-day Belgium. This reclamation would become his most impressive achievement. These impressive works started in 1619 with the digging of a drainage channel with about twenty windmills, pumping water into the channel, discharging eventually into the sea. This colossal work came finally to end in 1627; so pleased was the archduke that in 1618 he made Cobergher a baron, master of the seignories of Cobergher, Sint-Antheunis and Groenlandt. By this ennoblement he became master of about half the territory of Les Moëres. This would prove to be a serious disadvantage as these properties drew him into a dire financial situation.

Cobergher died in Brussels on 23 November 1634, leaving his family in deep financial trouble. His properties in Les Moëres had to be sold, as well as his house in Brussels. Even his extensive art and coin collection was auctioned off for 10,000 guilders.
