= Arbre =

Arbre may refer to:

- Arbre, Ath, a commune in Ath, Belgium
- Arbre, Profondeville, a village in Profondeville, Belgium
- Arbre, a planet in Anathem by Neal Stephenson

== See also ==
- Arbres de la liberté or liberty trees, a symbol of the French Revolution
- Arbre du Ténéré, once considered the most isolated tree on Earth
- Arbre Magique, a line of disposable air fresheners
- L'arbre de ciència or Tree of Science, a 1295 encyclopedia by Ramon Llull
- "Arbre", a 1996 song written by Philippe Tatartcheff and Anna McGarrigle
- "Aux arbres citoyens", a 2007 song by French singer Yannick Noah
