= List of protected heritage sites in Belœil =

This table shows an overview of the protected heritage sites in the Walloon town Belœil. This list is part of Belgium's national heritage.

Object	Year/architect	Town/section	Address	Coordinates	Number^{?}	Image
Ensemble formed by Gossart square ^{(nl)} ^{(fr)}		Beloeil	Beloeil	50.548896°N 3.731494°E	51008-CLT-0001-01 Info	Ensemble gevormd door het plein Gossart
Castle of Beloeil with outbuildings, bridge, obelisk, pavilions and temples ^{(nl)} ^{(fr)}		Beloeil		50.551932°N 3.728705°E	51008-CLT-0002-01 Info	Kasteel van Beloeil met bijgebouwen, brug, obelisk, paviljoens en tempels
Classic landscaping, the garden and the English garden of the castle of Beloeil ^{(nl)} ^{(fr)}		Beloeil		50.552536°N 3.725899°E	51008-CLT-0004-01 Info	Klassieke tuinaanleg, de moestuin en het Engels tuin van het kasteel van Beloeil
Group of the Neptune Fountain, the domain of beloeil ^{(nl)} ^{(fr)}		Beloeil		50.547173°N 3.725951°E	51008-CLT-0005-01 Info	
Church of Saint-Gery ^{(nl)} ^{(fr)}		Beloeil	Aubechies	50.574289°N 3.676263°E	51008-CLT-0006-01 Info	Kerk Saint-Géry
Church of Saint-Pierre ^{(nl)} ^{(fr)}		Beloeil	Rameignies-Quevaucamps	50.543917°N 3.635008°E	51008-CLT-0012-01 Info	Kerk Saint-Pierre
Mer de Sable ^{(nl)} ^{(fr)}		Stambruges Beloeil	Beleoil	50.497976°N 3.719117°E	51008-CLT-0015-01 Info	"Mer de Sable"
Windmill Wadelincourt ^{(nl)} ^{(fr)}		Beloeil		50.536455°N 3.653543°E	51008-CLT-0016-01 Info	Windmolen van Wadelincourt
Facades and roofs of the castle Daudergnies ^{(nl)} ^{(fr)}		Beloeil	rue de la Victoire	50.530200°N 3.647860°E	51008-CLT-0017-01 Info	Gevels en daken van kasteel Daudergnies
The building near the primary school adjacent to the church Saint-Gery ^{(nl)} ^{(fr)}		Aubechies Beloeil	Aubechies	50.574431°N 3.676499°E	51008-CLT-0018-01 Info	
The site of the domain of Castle of Beloeil / Princes of Ligne ^{(nl)} ^{(fr)}		Beloeil		50.524740°N 3.699214°E	51008-PEX-0001-01 Info	De site van het domein van het Kasteel van Beloeil/prinsen van Ligne
The classic garden, vegetable garden and the English garden of the castle of the Princes of Ligne ^{(nl)} ^{(fr)}		Beloeil		50.552536°N 3.725899°E	51008-PEX-0002-01 Info	De klassieke tuin, de moestuin en het Engels tuin van het kasteel van de Prinsen van Ligne

== See also ==
- List of protected heritage sites in Hainaut (province)
- Belœil
