= La Berlière Castle =

Castle in Wallonia, Belgium

La Berlière Castle (French: Château de la Berlière) (Dutch: Kasteel van La Berlière)
- Route de Frasnes 243, 7812 Ath, Belgium
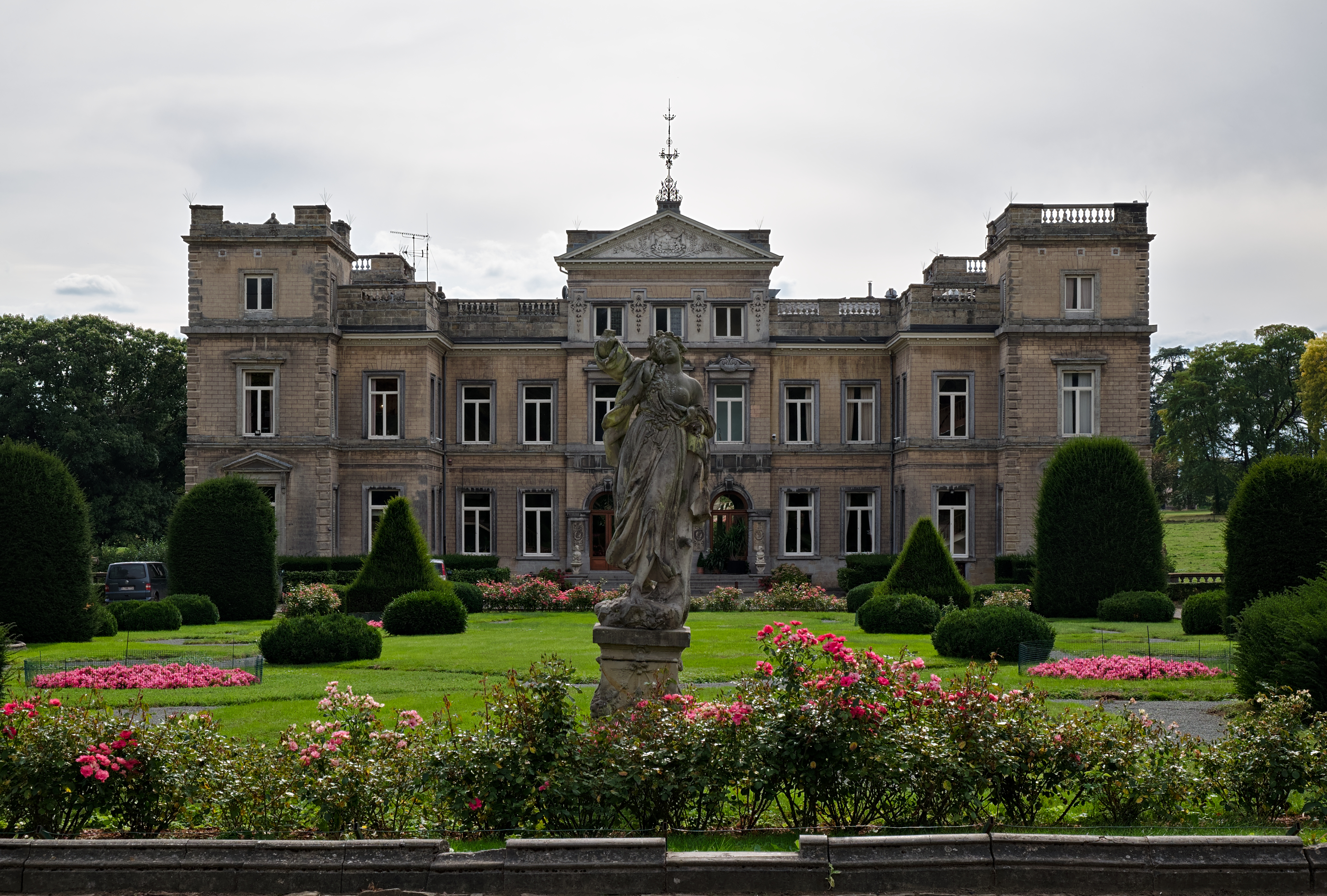

Site information
- Type: Castle

Location
- Coordinates: 50.64100035930154°N 3.6930002186608624°E

La Berlière Castle is located in the village of Houtaing, in the city of Ath, Belgium, and stands as a protected heritage site by the region of Wallonia. The original construction of the castle is unknown however, it has been documented that the building has been rebuilt multiple times, with its first known restructure occurring in 1677 and then again from 1793 to 1835. The current appearance of the castle features a mixture of traditional Belgian and Renaissance styles that are still present from its 1793 redevelopment. It is seen today as a reflection of the Wallonia region’s architectural history with its neoclassical design via the structure’s symmetrical and harmonious elements that spread from the main building into the gardens.

There is little information available about who inhabited La Berlière across the centuries. However, it has been recorded that the family of Count of Oultremont lived in the castle from 1845 - 1910 and provided the local villagers with employment within the castle walls and outside of it with the Count’s involvement in developing the infrastructure for the village of Houtaing. The castle was then purchased by the Motte family in 1910, who then occupied it until 1945.

In 1946, the castle was converted into a boarding school founded by the Congregation of the Josephite Fathers, serving as a free Catholic school for boys, known as Collège de la Berlière. The inside of the castle was renovated to serve as a school, featuring the creation of classrooms, social spaces, boarding rooms, and sports facilities. 50 years later, in 1996, the school merged with Institut de la Visitation in Lessines to become Collège Visitation-La Berlière. Collectively, both schools hold a student population of 300, with 200 students being located in Houtaing and 100 in Lessines. In Houtaing, students focus on general education, and in Lessines, they are given the opportunity to attend technical qualifications courses. In September 2017, the college started to enrol female students for the first time, following an increase in demand for female placements, providing them with a separate pavilion on the grounds of La Berlière to give them the boarding school experience.

== See also ==
- List of castles in Belgium
