= Pierre Descamps =

Belgian politician

- Born: Pierre Paul Louis Albert César Descamps; 15 October 1916; Ath
- Died: 19 April 1992 (aged 75); Bordeaux
- Occupation: Politician

Pierre Paul Louis Albert César Descamps (French: [dekɑ̃]; 15 October 1916 – 19 April 1992) was a Belgian politician and burgomaster for the PLP.

Descamps was born in Ath; he was a licentiate in philosophy and literature and an industrialist. He was burgomaster of Aubechies and Belœil and senator (1961–1985) for the PLP. Descamps was President of the PVV-PLP in 1969–1972. He died in Bordeaux, aged 75.

== Sources ==
- Presidents of the Belgian liberal party
