= Julien-Joseph Ducorron =

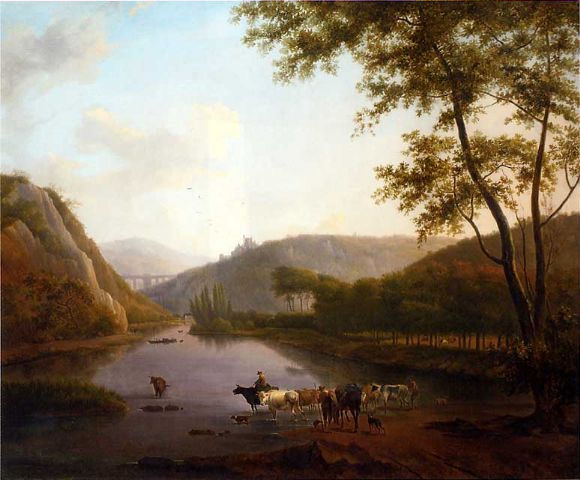
A wooded river landscape with cattle watering, a viaduct and town beyond, 1813

Julien-Joseph Ducorron (15 November 1770 – 22 March 1848) was a Belgian landscape painter.

Ducorron was born at Ath. At the age of thirty-two, he devoted himself to the art of painting under the direction of Balthasar Paul Ommeganck, and made marvellous progress as a landscape painter, obtaining several gold medals. He was afterwards director of the Academy at Ath, where he died in 1848. The Brussels Museum has by him a "View in the neighbourhood of Irchonwelz, near Chièvres, Hainault", and a "Gale of Wind at Sunset". Ducorron died in his home town of Ath, aged 77.

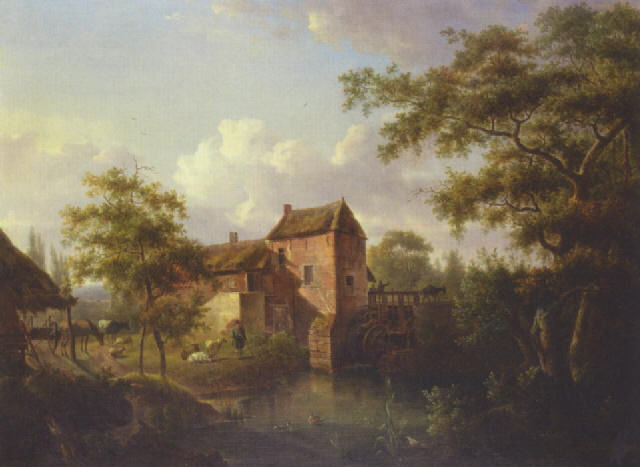
Landscape with mill, 1818
