= List of protected heritage sites in Ath =

This table shows an overview of the protected heritage sites in the Walloon town Ath. This list is part of Belgium's national heritage.

Object	Year/architect	Town/section	Address	Coordinates	Number^{?}	Image
City Hall ^{(nl)} ^{(fr)}		Aat		50.630585°N 3.777075°E	51004-CLT-0001-01 Info	Raadhuis
old house ^{(nl)} ^{(fr)}		Aat	rue Haute n° 27	50.629530°N 3.780126°E	51004-CLT-0003-01 Info	Huis, oude vluchtplaats van de abdij van Ghislenghien (gevel)
Church of St. Julien ^{(nl)} ^{(fr)}		Aat		50.629011°N 3.775421°E	51004-CLT-0006-01 Info	Kerk Saint-Julien: koor en toren
Stations of the Cross in St. Martin's church ^{(nl)} ^{(fr)}		Aat		50.632153°N 3.777554°E	51004-CLT-0007-01 Info	Calvarie (begrafenis) van kerk Saint-Martin
Castle Burbant ^{(nl)} ^{(fr)}		Aat		50.630962°N 3.774602°E	51004-CLT-0008-01 Info	Toren en kasteel Burbant en het ensemble van het kasteel met omgeving
St. Martin's church ^{(nl)} ^{(fr)}		Aat		50.632012°N 3.777250°E	51004-CLT-0010-01 Info	Kerk Saint-Martin
Bridge and fortifications ^{(nl)} ^{(fr)}		Aat		50.633684°N 3.775268°E	51004-CLT-0011-01 Info	Versterkte muur: brug de la Herse en bastion van Vlaanderen
House of Piety ^{(nl)} ^{(fr)}		Aat	rue du Spectacle, Ath	50.628461°N 3.778019°E	51004-CLT-0014-01 Info	Gevel van huis van Piété
Ruins of Fort du Mont-Féron ^{(nl)} ^{(fr)}		Aat	chaussée de Tournai	50.632438°N 3.767430°E	51004-CLT-0016-01 Info	
Mason's guild hall ^{(nl)} ^{(fr)}		Aat	rue de la Fosse n° 45	50.617702°N 3.802804°E	51004-CLT-0017-01 Info	Huis van de steenhouwers: gevel en dak
Old Brasserie ^{(nl)} ^{(fr)}		Aat	rue de la fosse 56	50.618284°N 3.802011°E	51004-CLT-0021-01 Info	
Brasserie extension ^{(nl)} ^{(fr)}		Aat	rue de la Fosse 56	50.618380°N 3.801786°E	51004-CLT-0022-01 Info	
Castle Berliere grounds ^{(nl)} ^{(fr)}		Aat		50.649826°N 3.684776°E	51004-CLT-0026-01 Info	Ensemble van het kasteel van Berlière, de dreef, de Franse tuin, de vijver, de boerderij en het park
Castle Berliere ^{(nl)} ^{(fr)}		Aat		50.641813°N 3.693131°E	51004-CLT-0027-01 Info	Gevels en daken van het kasteel Berlière en de decoratieve elementen
Fortified house of Irchonwelz ^{(nl)} ^{(fr)}		Aat		50.620488°N 3.758033°E	51004-CLT-0028-01 Info	Versterkt huis van Irchonwelz
Irchonwelz grounds ^{(nl)} ^{(fr)}		Aat		50.620214°N 3.755512°E	51004-CLT-0029-01 Info	Ensemble van het versterkte huis van Irchonwelz en diens omgeving
Moulin de la Marquise (windmill) ^{(nl)} ^{(fr)}	1747-1752	Aat Moulbaix	Moulbaix	50.598503°N 3.719367°E	51004-CLT-0033-01 Info	Windmolen en bos genaamd Moulin de la Marquise
Old house ^{(nl)} ^{(fr)}		Aat	rue du Noir Boeuf n° 3	50.628630°N 3.779028°E	51004-CLT-0034-01 Info	Huis: gevels en daken
Brasserie Langie House ^{(nl)} ^{(fr)}		Aat		50.632229°N 3.777989°E	51004-CLT-0036-01 Info	Bepaalde delen van de Brasserie Langie: de gevels en daken Grand'Rue des Bouchers, en een deel van de gevels aan de binnenplaats
Old house ^{(nl)} ^{(fr)}		Aat	rue Beugnies 2-4	50.628199°N 3.778797°E	51004-CLT-0038-01 Info	Huis: gevels en daken
House ^{(nl)} ^{(fr)}		Aat	rue Beugnies 6	50.628258°N 3.778876°E	51004-CLT-0039-01 Info	Huis: gevels en daken
Old house ^{(nl)} ^{(fr)}		Aat	rue Beugnies 8	50.628300°N 3.778872°E	51004-CLT-0040-01 Info	Huis: gevels en daken
Site de la Cavée		Aat		50.676811°N 3.801366°E	51004-CLT-0041-01 Info	
House ^{(nl)} ^{(fr)}		Aat Moulbaix		50.606089°N 3.713889°E	51004-CLT-0042-01 Info	Kasteel van Moulbaix: gevels, daken en lobby
Chapel of Notre-Dame au Chêne ^{(nl)} ^{(fr)}		Aat	chaussée de Tournai, links van n°241	50.627706°N 3.746032°E	51004-CLT-0043-01 Info	
Castle Bourlu ^{(nl)} ^{(fr)}		Aat		50.631544°N 3.779558°E	51004-CLT-0044-01 Info	Kasteel Bourlu: gevels en daken
Le Blanc Moulin (windmill) ^{(nl)} ^{(fr)}		Aat Ostiches	chemin de la Cocampe, links van n°326	50.676048°N 3.762809°E	51004-CLT-0045-01 Info	Molen genaamd Le Blanc Moulin
Calc oven ^{(nl)} ^{(fr)}		Aat		50.616302°N 3.801402°E	51004-CLT-0047-01 Info	
Old farmhouse ^{(nl)} ^{(fr)}		Aat		50.652074°N 3.753235°E	51004-CLT-0048-01 Info	Boerderij: gevels en daken, en die van de schuur
Old house ^{(nl)} ^{(fr)}		Aat	rue de Scamps, n° 57 et alentours	50.619626°N 3.789917°E	51004-CLT-0049-01 Info	Huis: gevels en daken, en de totaliteit van de potale
Castle Francqué (or Castle Coron) ^{(nl)} ^{(fr)}		Aat	chaussée de Lessines n° 75	50.646135°N 3.797256°E	51004-CLT-0050-01 Info	
Old house ^{(nl)} ^{(fr)}		Aat	rue du Pont-Mouchon	50.618798°N 3.754118°E	51004-CLT-0051-01 Info	
Farmhouse ^{(nl)} ^{(fr)}		Aat	rue de l'enfer n° 2	50.662585°N 3.782025°E	51004-CLT-0052-01 Info	
Chapel Notre-Dame du Refuge ^{(nl)} ^{(fr)}		Aat	rue du Carnier n° 3 en 5	50.639370°N 3.680957°E	51004-CLT-0054-01 Info	Kapel Notre-Dame van het Refuge of Mausoleum van Oultremont op nr 3 en, voormalig Hospice "Refuge Saint-Clément", omliggende muur en vijver of "abreuvoir", en de percelen er rond omheen
Mason's guild house ^{(nl)} ^{(fr)}		Aat	rue de la Fosse n° 47.	50.617770°N 3.802639°E	51004-CLT-0055-01 Info	Huis van de steenhouwers: gevels en daken
Mason's guild house ^{(nl)} ^{(fr)}		Aat	rue de la Fosse n° 49.	50.617813°N 3.802538°E	51004-CLT-0056-01 Info	Huis van de steenhouwers: gevels en daken
Mason's guild house ^{(nl)} ^{(fr)}		Aat	rue de la Fosse n° 51.	50.617843°N 3.802459°E	51004-CLT-0057-01 Info	Huis van de steenhouwers: gevels en daken
Tower of Burbant ^{(nl)} ^{(fr)}		Aat		50.630962°N 3.774602°E	51004-PEX-0001-01 Info	Toren van Burbant
Mausoleum Oultremont ^{(nl)} ^{(fr)}		Aat		50.639370°N 3.680957°E	51004-PEX-0002-01 Info	Mausoleum Oultremont en het ensemble van het mausoleum, de omliggende muur, de hospice en de omliggende terreinen

== See also ==
- List of protected heritage sites in Hainaut (province)
- Ath
