= Jean Taisnier =

Wallonian musician, mathematician and astrologer

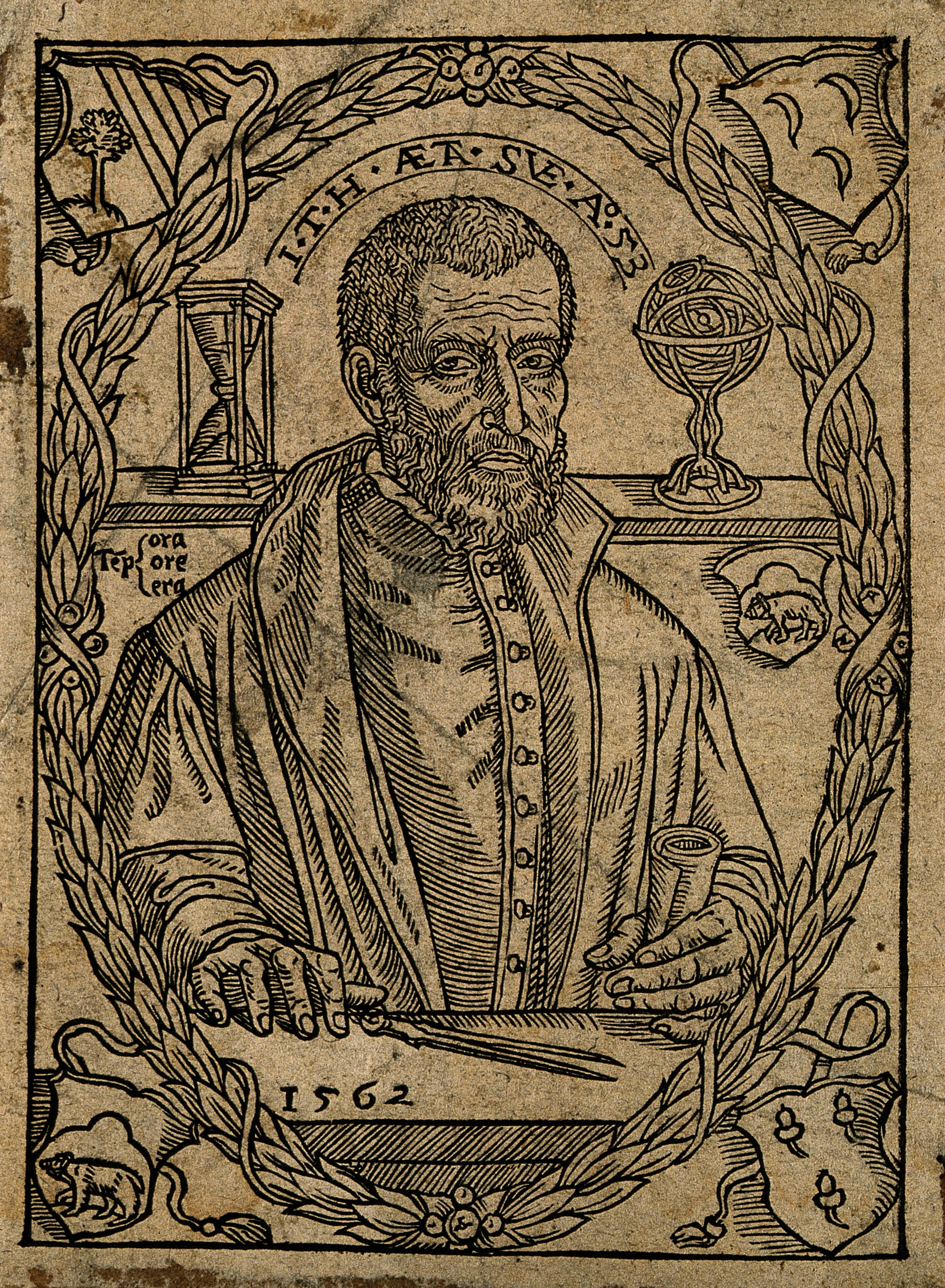
Woodcut author portrait of Jan Taisnier, 1562, aged 53 (Wellcome Collection)

Jean Taisnier (or Taisner) (Latin: Johannes Taisnierius; 1508, Ath, Habsburg Netherlands – 1562, Cologne), surnamed Hannonius (i.e., of the County of Hainaut), was a Wallonian musician, mathematician and astrologer who published a number of works and taught in various European cities and universities. In some sources he is mis-named Jean Fuisnier. He was for some time schoolmaster of the boys of the Chapel (Sacellanus) in the court of Emperor Charles V. By 1559 he styled himself "Poet Laureate" (a laureation of the Holy Roman Empire), and "Doctor of both Laws", but upon what authority is unknown. While he propounded a general theory of Mathematics in four "Quantities" of Astronomy, Geometry, Arithmetic and Music, and aimed to publish a general exposition of them, he became preoccupied with astrology and cheiromancy, and neglected to publish his advertised Treatise on Music which (given his experience) might have been the most interesting of all his works. His unacknowledged use of the work of other authors has incurred the accusation of plagiarism. He was the great-uncle of David Teniers the Elder.

== Life ==
=== Origins and education ===
John, or Jehan, Taisnier was one of the children of Thomas Taisnière, a successful Wallonian merchant who owned various properties near the market-place of the city of Ath, and his wife, demoiselle Cathérine de l'Issue. The families were long-established in that place. He had a sister Françoise and brothers Joachim (Taynière) and Pierchon. These relationships are illustrated in a series of deeds in the archives of Ath: they show that father Thomas died before 4 October 1522, when Joachim, the eldest son, succeeded him as "matricularius" or parochial clerk for registrations, of the church of Saint-Julien (an office held by contract). Joachim was the grandfather of the painter David Teniers the Elder.

Jean went to college in Ath, and studied Law at the University of Louvain, from which he acquired the title "Maître" (Master) by which he was known from 1531. It was not until 1558 that he referred to himself as "Doctor of both laws", so he probably did not obtain his doctorate at Louvain. Much of the available information about Taisner's life and career depends upon his own statements made at various places in his published works, and especially in his cheiromantic readings, which are full of biographical details. His examples given in the Opus Mathematicum of 1562 might almost have been selected to provide a narrative of his own life. The older authorities, and many of the more recent ones, seem to derive their information about him from his own writings.

This chorographic ode to the town of Ath gives a sample of his poetic fancy:

"Insigne oppidulum quo me genuere parentes,
Hannoniae illustris tenera lustrat Athum;
Cuius saepe ferox Australia lumina Gallus
Proripuit secum Martia castra trahens.
Illinc oppositam borealem Flandriae plagam
Respicit, Occeanis saepe coacta vadis.
Phoebus ubi radios ortus infundere terris
Incipit ab Euro terra Brabanta iacet.
Arthesiam Corus dulci spiramine nutrit,
Occubuit quorsum Belgica saepe phalanx."

Translation:

Famed little town where my forefathers bred me,
Ath surveys the bounds of illustrious Hainault;
Whose southern splendours oft the ferocious Gaul
has torn away, drawing up his Martial camp.
Thence to the north it looks towards the shore
of Flanders, oft constrained by Ocean shoals.
Where Phoebus pours to earth the sun's first rays,
from easterly Eurus, lies the land of Brabant.
North-westerly Corus with sweet breath freshens Artois:
for these the Belgian army often fell."

=== The Imperial Chapel ===
In 1542, Taisnier was Master of the school for the children of the Imperial Chapel of Emperor Charles V: he was given charge of five children whose voices were no longer suitable, whom he took back to Louvain to pursue their higher studies. In the same capacity he addressed himself in a letter to Mary of Hungary (governor of the Netherlands), requesting possession of the prebend of Leuze-en-Hainaut, which had been granted to him by the Emperor. Although the prebendary was an ecclesiastical officer, it is supposed that this was granted to Taisnier as a layman, as a customary means of paying him for his service: there is no certain evidence that he was in holy orders. At that time the Maître de Chapelle to Charles V was Nicolas Gombert, and it is important to distinguish Taisnier's role as instructor in languages and literary education, from the musical instruction, though as musician Taisnier was apparently a singer in the Chapel choir. In the 1558 form of his publication on the Use of the Spherical Rings (an instrument for geometrical observation), Taisnier in the title-page describes himself as "Caesareae majestatis Caroli V, invictissimi, quondam sacellanus et cantor domesticus, puerorumque sacelli pedagogus" ("sometime household chapel instructor and singer of his most puissant imperial majesty Charles V, and teacher of the boys of the chapel").

Authorities trace the assertion by De La Serna (1809) that, in a musical capacity, Taisnier accompanied the Emperor's expedition to the conquest of Tunis (1535): this derives from Giacomo Filippo Tomasini (1630), from the Abbate Ghilini (1633), or from Isaac Bullart (1682), and not (as implied) from Lodovico Guicciardini (1567). Taisnier noted, in one of his "Chyromantiae" published in 1562, that in 1538, at Toledo, Spain, he was with singers of the Imperial Chapel to celebrate the Low German festival of the Three Kings (i.e. Epiphany 1538/39), though he did not say whether his connection with the court was then formal. There also he claimed to have witnessed the demonstration, before the Emperor and many others, of a submersible vessel in which a lighted candle was carried under the waves of the river Tagus and returned to the surface still burning. In 1541 Taisnier was with the Imperial Chapel at Valladolid, where in another demonstration of palmistry he recorded the death of his pupil Ysbrande Bus, who had the voice of a nightingale and was at the head of 60 singers in the Imperial Chapel, but devoted himself to drink and gluttony. Having got into a fight in which he bit off the ear of an imperial messenger, Bus disdained to travel with the other singers, succumbed to a fever, and was cast into the sea ("piscibus in escam proiectus est"). This incident occurred as the Emperor's fleet was making his ill-fated expedition to Algiers, late in 1541, in which Taisnier with the singers of the Imperial Chapel accompanied him.

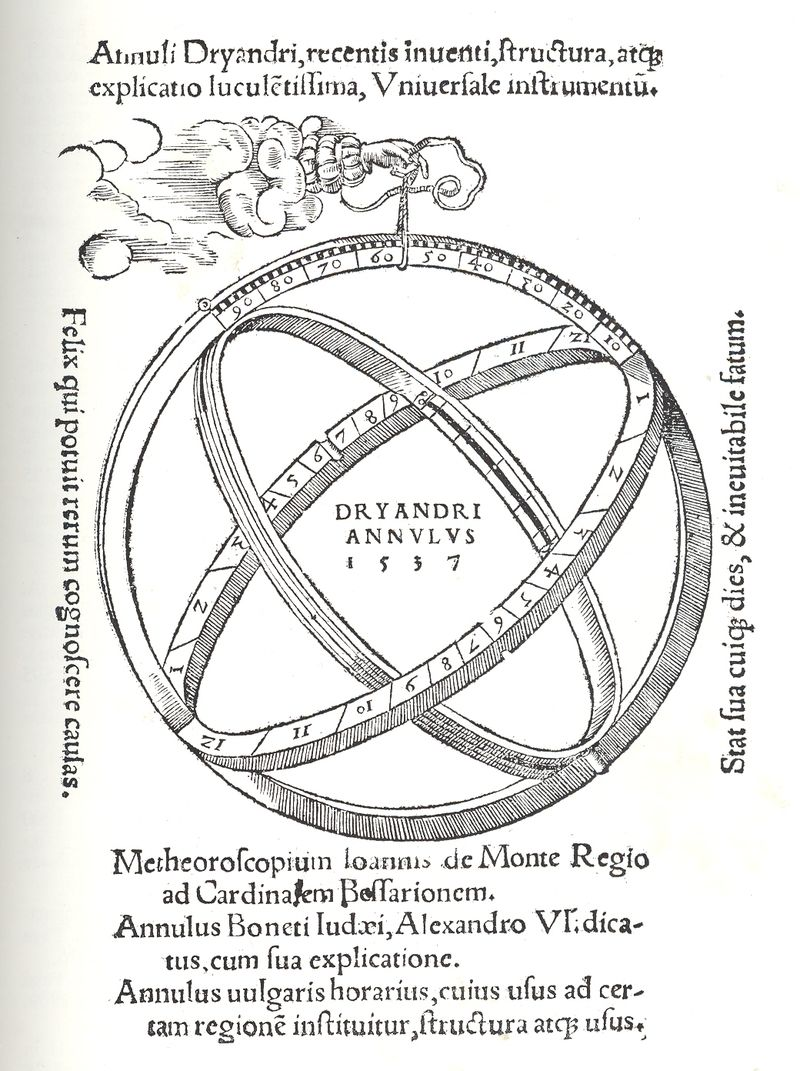
Illustration of astronomical rings, from Johannes Dryander, Annulorum trium diversi generis... (Marburg 1537).

=== Teaching in Italy and Sicily ===
Having obtained the prebend of Leuze in 1542, he spent the next years in Italy and Sicily. In 1546-47 he was teaching Mathematics in the public academies in Rome, and in 1548 was teaching at Ferrara. He mentioned also teaching in Bologna and Pavia, and in 1559 claimed to have been travelling in Europe, Asia and Africa continually for twenty years. In Ferrara he published his first books, beginning with a Latin Oration made in November 1547, with a work on the Construction and Use of Spheres, prefaced by some (Latin) epigrams: he describes himself as "Poeta" in the title. He followed with the Italian-language Manual on the Spherical Rings (astronomical rings), a surveying instrument comprising three intersecting rings by which trigonometric measurements could be calculated. (This coincided with the Latin manual by Gemma Frisius on the use of the astronomical rings, containing some similar illustrations, published at Antwerp in 1548 but with dedication dated 1534).

He returned to Rome in 1549, then proceeded to Palermo and entered the service of Pietro Tagliavia d'Aragonia, from 1544 Archbishop of Palermo. The archbishop had met him at Trent, and instructed him to bring 10 chanters and two sopranists from Flanders. For two years Taisnier served as "phonascus", or vocal mentor, at the cathedral of Palermo, giving lessons in mathematics. At Palermo in 1550 he published his work on the Spherical Rings, De Usu Annuli Sphaerici, in Latin, with dedications to the Barone Antonino Oddo and Prospero Minarbett, and to the censor, the dominican Salvatore Mangiavacca: and here, it appears, he manufactured astronomical instruments, including a Planisphere of the material sphere, Astronomic compasses, and spherical rings, for which the Spanish physician-turned-Jesuit attending Jerome Prince failed to pay him.

=== With Mendoza to Flanders ===
In 1551 he was at Trapani in Sicily, and took part in a military expedition against the Turks in Reggio Calabria, afterwards returning to Naples via Seminara. Taisnier resolved to devote himself no longer to musical disciplines: but despite this, he now became Director of Musicians to Cardinal Francisco Mendoza de Bobadilla, Bishop of Burgos, in Rome. (In those years Orlando di Lassus and Pierluigi da Palestrina were both active in Rome.) The Cardinal planned to visit the Emperor in Flanders, and asked Taisnier to undertake the work. In this way he accompanied the Cardinal to Venice and Florence, where they remained for some months, then to Trent, where they celebrated the Carnevale. From there they went to Mechlin (Malines), where a very excellent young singer of their company, Fabius Gazella, died of dysentery. Having returned to his homeland, it is assumed that Taisnier remained in the employment of the Imperial Chapel at least until 1555, when the Emperor surrendered his power in the Netherlands: an undated comment refers to his having directed the sopranists of the Imperial Chapel at Brussels.

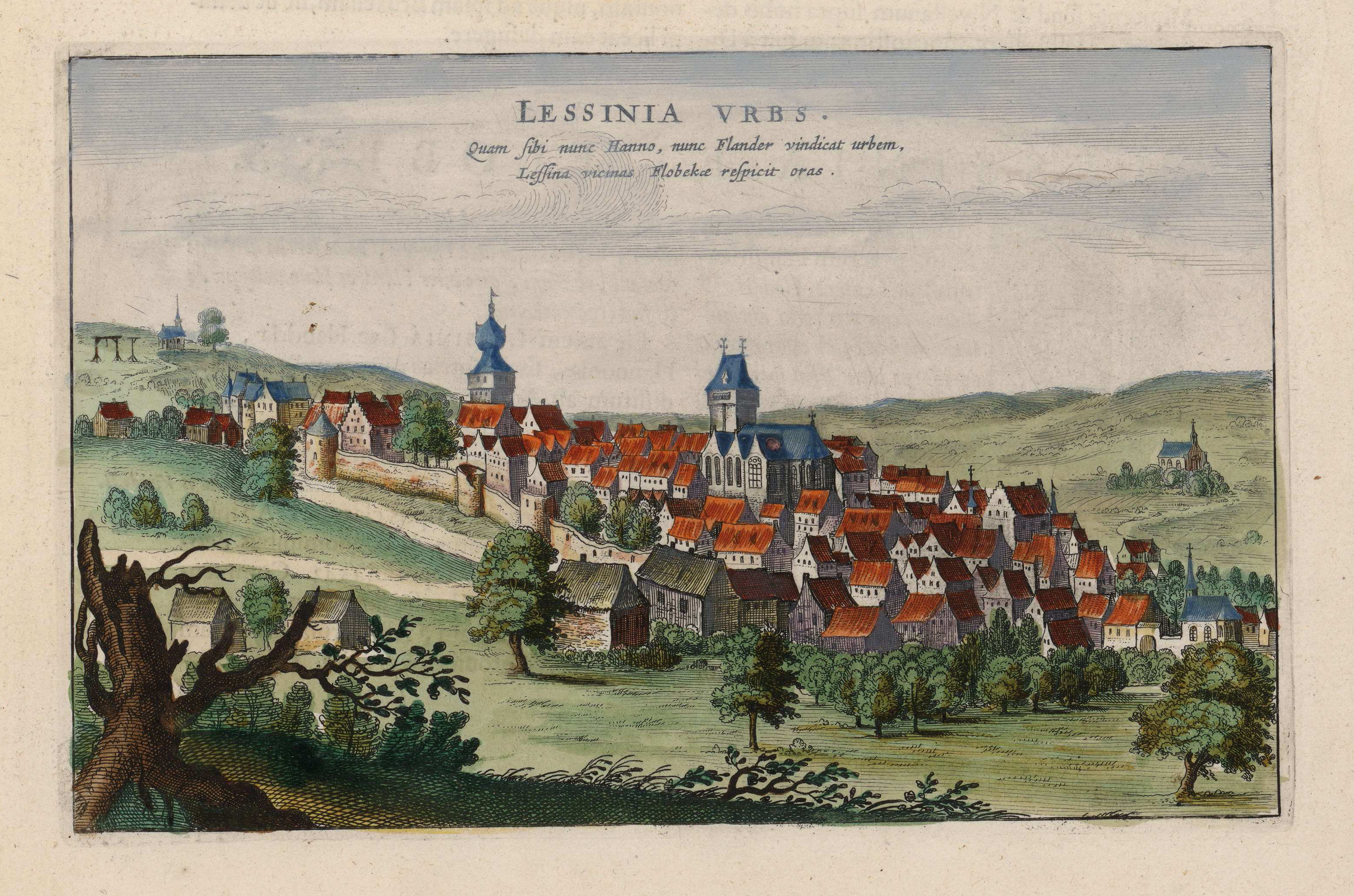
Lessines, Hainault, depicted by Joan Blaeu, c. 1649

=== Lessines ===
Perhaps in consequence of this change, in 1555 Taisnier moved to Lessines in Hainaut, where for two years he taught as head of a higher school with five junior masters. The pupils, many of whom were children of noblemen, numbered more than four hundred, and were instructed in Greek and Latin, Spanish and French, and in music. In 1556 at Lessines another of his pupil singers died. James de Sableau had been brought by Taisnier from Hainaut as a boy, had been with him for two years at Palermo, and had followed with him from Naples to Rome, through Italy and back to the homeland. In October 1556 Jean Taisnier and his sister Françoise sold an annual rent on their shared property, the hostelry at the sign of the Golden Eagle at the market-place in Ath, to Guillaume de Corgnet, "lieutenant du bailly de la ville de Lessines".

=== Cologne, 1558-1562 ===
Taisnier's final move, by 1558, was to Cologne, where he undertook teaching in the schools and university, he served as Kapellmeister to Jan Gebhardus, Archbishop-Elector of Cologne (died 1562), and from where, in the space of five years, most of his published works came through the press. Although these were not musical works, two of his main publishers were from families (Bathen and Birckmann) closely associated with music publishing. It was (only) at the end of the 'Epistola Dedicatoria' of the Opusculum... De Natura Magnetis, dedicated to Gebhard, that Taisnier referred to himself as "presbyter": Suae Celsitudinis Humillimus Orator et mancipium, Ioannes Taisnier Hannonius Presbyter. This title may have been accorded to him even as a layman in his role as Kapellmeister. It is similarly observed that his costume in the woodcut portrait is clerical. Most sources consider that Taisnier died in or soon after 1562, after which nothing more is heard of him living, though much later dates (1589, 1595) have also been proposed.

== Publications, 1558-1562 ==
=== The "Material Sphere", 1558, 1559 ===
The first of these, De Sphaerae Materialis Fabrica et Usu 128 Canonum Tituli ("128 Precept Titles on the Construction and Use of the Material Sphere"), produced by Iohannes Bathenius at Cologne in 1558, styles the author as Doctor of both laws ("utriusque Iuris D."), Poeta laureatus, and Mathematicus. It is a 24-page list of the chapter-headings of a projected work in eight books or sections, and is dedicated to his three students Jerome de Corde of Tournai, Gaspar Spoetz of Antwerp, and Henry Middelburgh of Brussels, making acknowledgement of the work of several contemporaries including Gemma Frisius.

It is followed by De Usu Spherae Materialis, by the same publisher in 1559, illustrating on the title page a mounted planisphere formed by astronomical rings enclosing other internal circuits around a central body (similar to that depicted in his author-portrait of 1562). This, then, is the "Material Sphere". In his dedication to Hufkens of Groningen, which opens with a detailed account of his travels, he cites as his principal authority the work of Johannes de Sacrobosco, in particular the Tractatus de Sphaera Mundi (written about A.D. 1230 and describing a Ptolemaic cosmography). Taisnier's work, of 46 folios, restricts itself to the astronomical uses of the instrument, though introducing an astrological theme in the dedication, and closing with the promise of an expanded work on the uses, yet to come. The intention is to describe the improvement of the armillary sphere by certain corrections, and by the addition of rings to make the instrument more useful in its application to astronomy, physiognomy and cheiromancy.

=== Judicial Astrology, 1559 ===
A more substantial astrological work, of nearly 200 folios, Taisnier's Astrologiae Iudiciariae Ysagogica, et Totius Divinatricis Artis Encomia ("Introductory Contextual Study of Judicial Astrology, and the Encomia of the Whole Divinatory Art"), appeared also in 1559, produced at Cologne by Arnold Birckmann. This book bore an august dedication, to William, Duke of Jülich-Cleves-Berg, Count de la Marck, Count of Ravensberg and Lord of Ravenstein (1516-1592), whose servant Taisnier declares himself to be. The Dedicatory Letter is important for the author's lengthy exposition of the four "Mathematical quantities", namely Astronomy, Geometry, Arithmetic and Music, "which are so interrelated that any one of them remains imperfect without the other." This résumé (which, according to Bosmans, may embody text first presented in separate form as Tabula Universalis) includes a detailed justification of the uses of astrology for prognostication and auguries, and for reading the sympathetic tendencies of individuals and circumstances revealed by cheiromancy, physiognomy, natal and occasional horoscopes and the like (without according direct agency to the celestial aspects). Most valuable, perhaps, is his summary of a projected or completed treatise on Music (not surviving in manuscript or print among his known works), which both in its terminology of musical theory and its description of instruments, should have held exceptional interest. His observations on Musica Reservata have attracted particular attention.

=== The Spherical Rings (new edition), 1560 ===
In 1560 a new edition of his work on the use of the Spherical Rings, De Annuli Sphaerici Fabrica et Usu Libri Tres Geometrici, was revised from the 1550 Palermo edition. This contribution to the Geometrical part of his scheme came from the press of Johannes Ricardus at Antwerp. The illustrations from the earlier edition, many dated 1549, were re-used, and the text was arranged in three sections: the first concerned the measurement of heights and distances of structures: the second described the measurement of the hours of the day by observation of the sidereal hour angle; the third concerned angles of trajectory for bombardment by artillery, and measurements for the construction of ladders and temporary assault bridges.

=== The Cheiromancy ("Opus Mathematicum"), 1562 ===
1562 saw the publication of his great cheiromantic endeavour, Opus Mathematicum octo libros complectens. An astrological work, six of the eight sections are devoted to the interpretation of the lines and aspects of the palm for divination and prognostications; the seventh section concerns physiognomy, and the eighth reproduces the Astrologiae Iudiciariae Ysagogica and Encomia. The sixth section, pp. 387-449, contains 61 extended palm-readings in which Taisnier tells us much about his own life from the 1530s onwards. The whole work was produced at Cologne by Johannes Birckmann and Werner Richwine, and Taisnier dedicated it to Johann Jakob Fugger (1516-1575), a very prominent patron of arts and sciences. The woodcut author-portrait of Taisnier dated 1562 appears near the beginning of the book. A second or reprinted edition was produced at Cologne by Theodor Baumius in 1583.

In the Opus Mathematicum, uniquely, Taisnier claimed to have travelled in America:

"Potiorem aetatis meae partem LIII. annos nunc natus, in diversis studiorum generibus versatus, totam fere Europam, magnam Africae, Asiae, Ameriaeque partem perlustravi, expertissimorum virorum ubique varias in diversis facultatibus opiniones colligens, collectas (ut par erat) in publicis Scholis et Academijs auditoribus communicavi, praesertim Romae, Ferrariae, Venetijs, Paduae, Florentiae, Panhormi, publice legendi provinciam suscipiendi..." (For the better part of the 53 years that I have now lived, being well versed in various kinds of studies, I have travelled studiously through nearly the whole of Europe, and a great part of Africa, Asia and America, everywhere collecting the various opinions of the most experienced men in their diverse fields of expertise: these things I have communicated (in like fashion) to audiences in the public schools and academies, especially by undertaking public reading at Rome, Ferrara, Venice, Padua, Florence, and Palermo...)

Taisnier's cheiromancy was strongly astrological in method. It was of this work that Giacomo Filippo Tomasini wrote, in 1630, that it contained such a mass of information that it merely wore out the patience of those whom it was intended to enlighten. Tomasini illustrated Taisnier's symbol as a medallion showing a right hand upright with the Great Triangle marked in the palm, and the words "In Manibus Sortes Ejus" above. It is clear that in his cheiromantic and physiognomic works, Taisnier owed a considerable debt to the works of Bartolomeo della Rocca (1467-1504), also called Barthélemy Cocles, whose Chyromantie ac Physionomie Anastasis, cum approbatione magistri Alexandri Achillinis was published at Bologna in 1504, but more probably known to Taisnier from the Physiognomiae et Chiromantiae Compendium produced by Iohannes Albertus at Strasbourg ("Argentorati") in 1536. Thorndike observed that the project of combining cheiromancy, physiognomy and astrology in a single work was presumably suggested by the example of Johannes ab Indagine (1467-1537).

=== Plagiarism: On the Nature of the Magnet, 1562 ===
Taisnier's 1562 publication entitled Opusculum perpetua memoria dignissimum, De Natura Magnetis et ejus effectibus, Item De Motu Continuo ("A little work worthy of preservation, On the Nature of the Magnet and its Effects, and another On Perpetual Motion") is a celebrated work of plagiarism. In his dedication to Jan Gebhardus, Taisnier claims the authorship as "hoc meum parvulum opusculum" - this my little work. Yet the text on the nature of the magnet is closely adapted from the Epistola de magnete of Peter of Maricourt (floruit 1269), while that on perpetual motion was actually by a living author, a Treatise on the fall of bodies of 1554 by Gianbattista Benedetti (1530-1590). Neither author is acknowledged, but the 1562 author-portrait of Taisnier reappears.

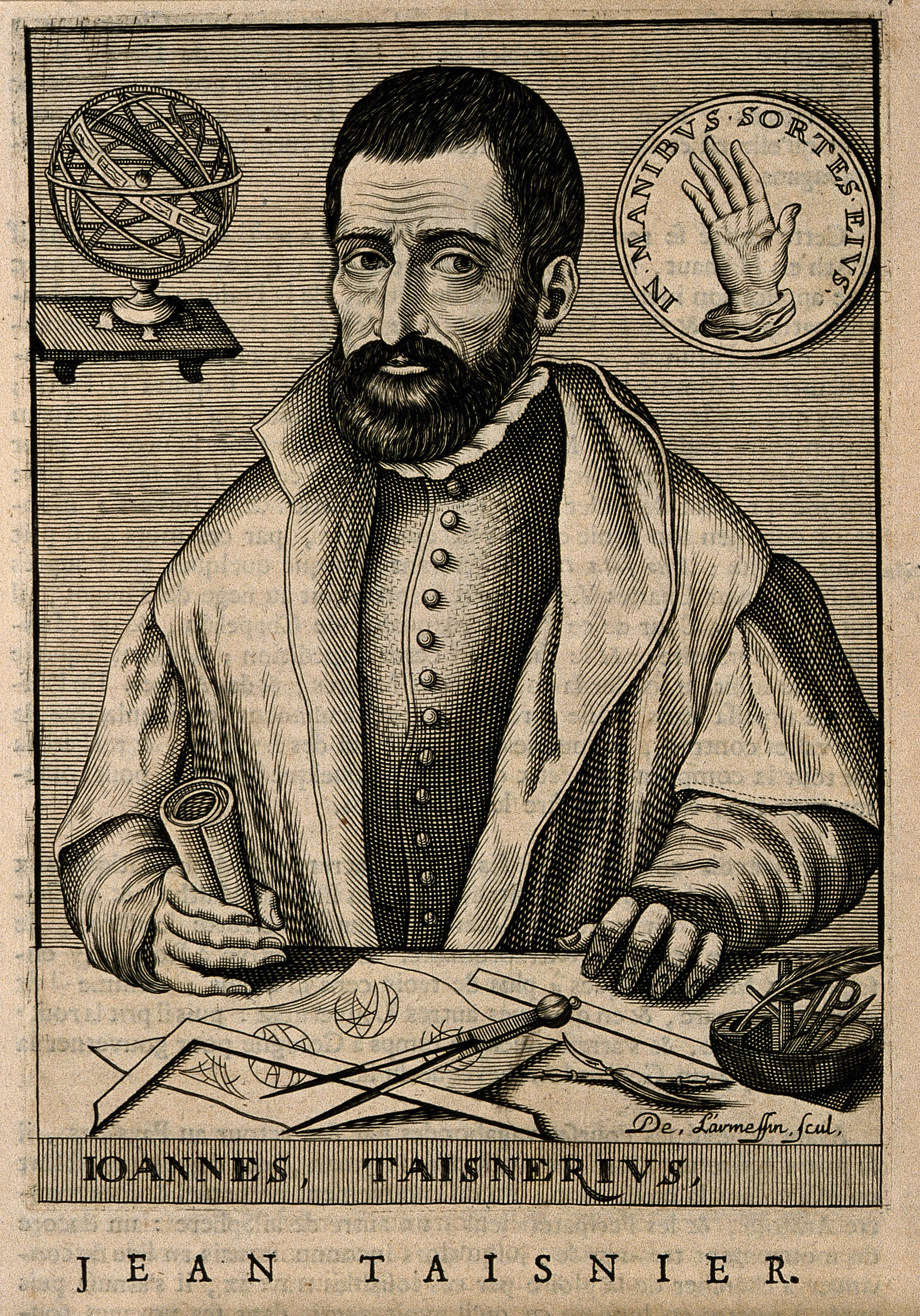
Portrait of Taisnier by N. de Larmessin, 1682, based on the 1562 woodcut

Benedetti's work describes a magnetic-based perpetual motion machine consisting of a ramp, a magnet stone and an iron ball. Peter of Maricourt had earlier noted such a system which made use of the strength of the magnet stone. This runs into trouble because the path integral of force on a closed loop in a magnetic field is zero (see History of perpetual motion machines). Taisnier's compilation was translated into English by Richard Eden before 1577. Benedetti himself drew attention to Taisnier's theft of his work, in the Preface Ad Lectorem of his De Gnomonum Umbrarumque Solarium Usu Liber (Turin 1574). In a long and extremely scathing condemnation, he cast doubts on Taisnier's claims to authority in anything he wrote. He speaks of those who criticize others while stealing their work,

"...ut fecit impurissimus omnium Iohannes Taisnerus Hannonius. Qui opusculum nostrum... ita integrum sibi desumpsit, ut nihil praeter authoris nomen immutaverit; quid enim mutavisset, qui nec percipere poterat quae in ea disputatione continerentur? Homo vanus ab omni mathematica facultate alienus, qui merito propter crassissimam ignorantiam verebatur, ne vel aliqua Syllaba sublata aut addita totius tractationis inficeretur substantia. Credidit (ut opinor) me iam vita functum qui furti nunquam argui posse confidit..." ("as John Taisnier Hannonius did, the most unwholesome of all of them. Who so completely took for himself our little work, that he altered nothing except the name of the author - for what could he have changed, this vain man devoid of all mathematical capability, who was not able to grasp the things contained in that discourse? who justly feared, on account of his very gross ignorance, that by the addition or removal of a single syllable he might undo the meaning of the entire argument. I think he believed that I was already dead, and trusted that I would never be able to denounce his theft...")

That (and much more) having been said, Bosmans makes the case that Taisnier, as a teacher, was attempting to synthesize and disseminate knowledge for students and for practical uses. He observes that it was not unusual in Taisnier's time for authors to make use of existing texts without specific acknowledgement, and that a particular degree of hostility seems to have been directed towards him by later commentators. On the other hand Bosmans acknowledges that, in his letters of dedication and frequent recitation of his credentials, Taisnier showed a discomforting tendency towards self-promotion, and joins the chorus of regret that Taisnier did not leave a musical treatise worthy of his undoubted expertise in that field. Thorndike surveys the plagiarism issue, and finds (as others have found) Taisnier a perplexing figure in whom a vein of intellectual dishonesty ran through the bedrock of his undoubted brilliance, usefulness and erudition, his rich experience and life of dutiful service. This is more whimsically conveyed by Isaac Bullart in his character sketch of 1682, who wrote sceptically of Taisnier's cheiromancy, "...sa science est impuissante; puisqu'elle est établie sur des fondemens aussi incertains qu'ils sont extravagans" ("his science is powerless; for it is built up upon foundations which are as uncertain as they are extravagant"). The woodcut of 1562 formed the model for a fresh engraving by Nicholas de Larmessin for this publication.

== Epitaph ==
The Gelderland academic Johannes Fontanus of Arnhem (1544-1615), Calvinist preacher to John Casimir, and Professor of Theology, wrote this epitaph for Taisnier:

"Teisnerus jacet hic, parvâ resupinus in Vrnâ,
Qui vaga, dum vixit, sydera transilijt.
Quò non dexteritas, quò non prænobile magni
Pertigit ingenium, cura, laborquè viri?"

Translation:

"Taisnier lies here, closed in a little Urn,
who, living, danced across the wandering stars.
Where does his prowess, where his outstanding mind,
this great man's care and labour, not resound?"
