= Basècles =

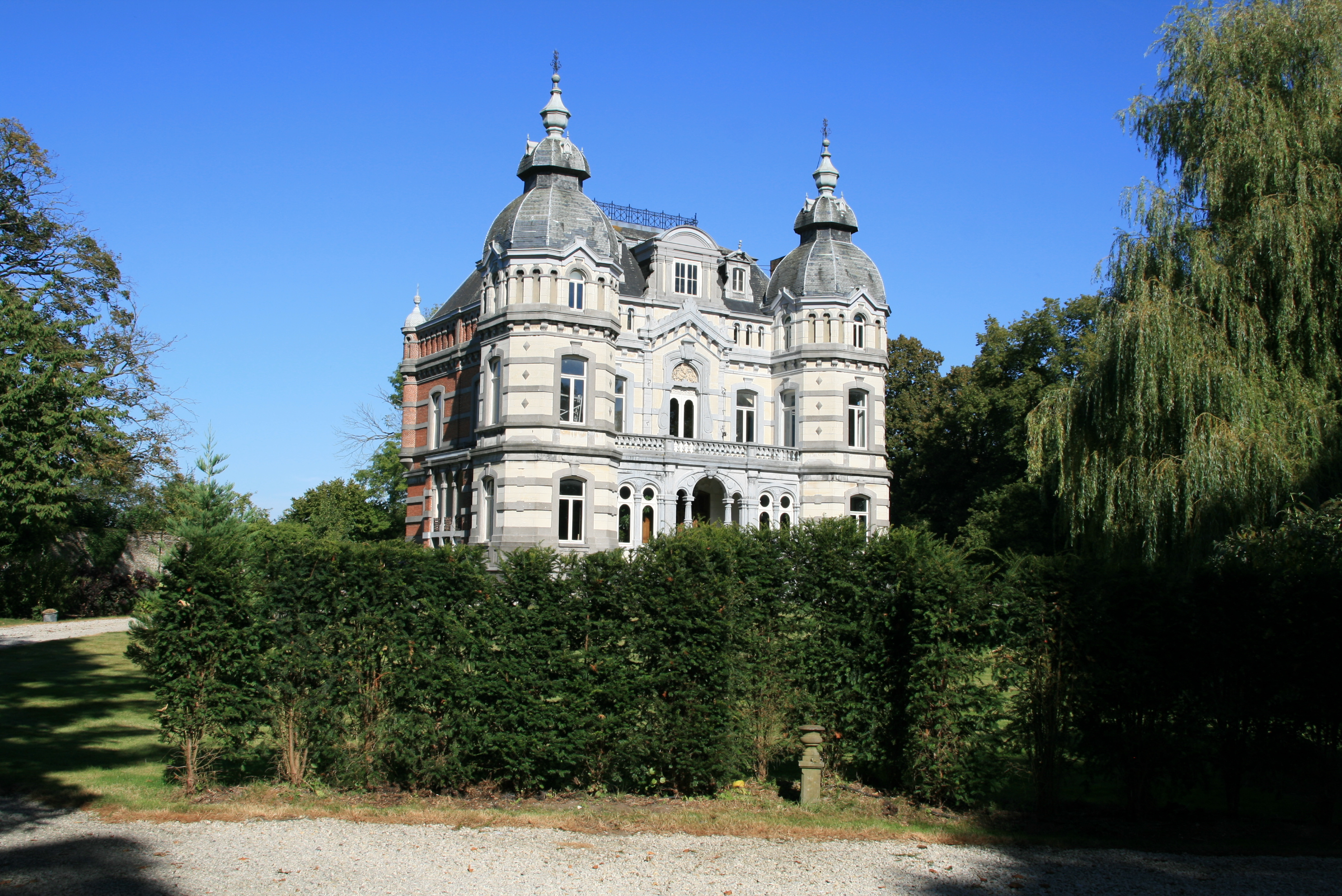
- Basècles, château de Daudergnies

- Location within Belgium Location within Europe
- Coordinates: 50°31′00″N 03°39′00″E
- Country: Belgium
- Region: Wallonia
- Province: Hainaut
- Municipality: Beloeil

Basècles is a village and district of the municipality of Beloeil, located in the Hainaut Province in Wallonia, Belgium.

The village history goes back at least to 1040, when Emperor Henry III donated the village to the Abbey of Ghislenghien. The village has been a centre of black marble extraction. The village church dates from 1779. There is also a small 19th-century château, built by Jean-Baptiste Daudergnies, who participated in the construction of the Panama Canal.
