= Ormeignies =

Village in Wallonia, Belgium

Coordinates: 50°36′N 3°45′E

Ormeignies (French pronunciation: [ɔʁmɛɲi]) is a village of Wallonia and district of the municipality of Ath, located in the province of Hainaut, Belgium. Farmers were settled there in Neolithic times, as far back as 4000 BC.

The village church, dedicated to Saint Ursmer and built from stone and brick c.1780, is in the neo-classical architectural style.
