= Giambattista Benedetti =

Italian mathematician (1530–1590)

- Born: 14 August 1530; Venice, Republic of Venice
- Died: 20 January 1590 (aged 59); Turin, Duchy of Savoy, Holy Roman Empire
- Scientific career
- Fields: Mathematician

Giambattista (Gianbattista) Benedetti (14 August 1530 – 20 January 1590) was an Italian mathematician from Venice who was also interested in physics, mechanics, the construction of sundials, and the science of music.

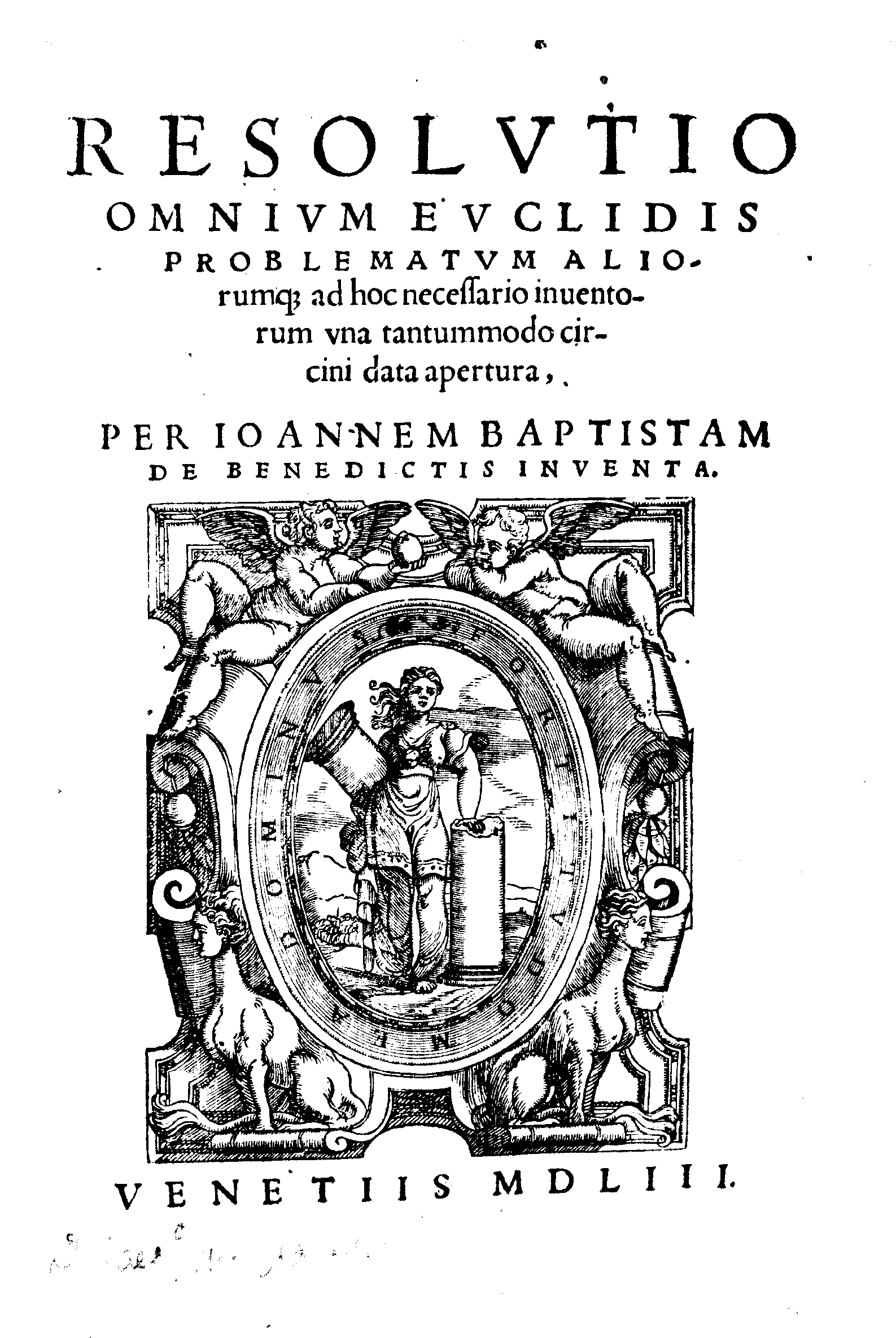
Resolutio omnium Euclidis problematum, 1553

== Science of motion ==
In his works Resolutio omnium Euclidis problematum (1553) and Demonstratio proportionum motuum localium (1554), Benedetti proposed a new doctrine of the speed of bodies in free fall. The accepted Aristotelian doctrine at that time was that the speed of a freely falling body is directly proportional to the total weight of the body and inversely proportional to the density of the medium. Benedetti's view was that the speed depends on just the difference between the specific gravity of the body and that of the medium. As opposed to the Aristotelian theory, his theory predicts that two objects of the same material but of different weights would fall at the same speed, and also that objects of different materials in a vacuum would fall at different though finite speeds.

In a second edition of the Demonstratio (also 1554), he extended this theory to include the effect of the resistance of the medium, which he said was proportional to the cross section or the surface area of the body. Thus two objects of the same material but of different surface areas would only fall at equal speeds in a vacuum. He repeated this version of his theory in his later Diversarum speculationum mathematicarum et physicarum liber (1585). In this work he explains his theory in terms of the then current theory of impetus.

It is thought that Galileo derived his initial theory of the speed of a freely falling body from his reading of Benedetti's works. Thus the account found in Galileo's De motu, his early work on the science of motion, follows Benedetti's initial theory as described above. It omits the later development which included the resistance of the medium and not just its density. In this early work, Galileo also subscribes to the theory of impetus.

In 1562, the Jesuit Jean Taisnier published from the press of Johann Birkmann of Cologne a work entitled Opusculum perpetua memoria dignissimum, de natura magnetis et ejus effectibus, Item de motu continuo. This is considered a piece of plagiarism, as Taisnier presents, as though his own, the Epistola de magnete of Peter of Maricourt and the second edition of Benedetti's Demonstratio.

== Music ==
In a letter to Cipriano de Rore dated from around 1563, Benedetti proposed a new theory of the cause of consonance, arguing that since sound consists of air waves or vibrations, in the more consonant intervals the shorter, more frequent waves concurred with the longer, less frequent waves at regular intervals. In the same letter, he proposed a measure of consonance by taking the product of the numerator and the denominator of a rational interval in lowest terms; this can be considered an early height function. Isaac Beeckman and Marin Mersenne both adopted this theory in the next century. When they sought Descartes' opinion on Benedetti's theory, Descartes declined to judge the goodness of consonances by such a rational method. Descartes argued that the ear prefers one or another according to the musical context rather than because of any concordance of vibrations.

Centuries later, Hermann von Helmholtz, in Sensations of Tone (1863) suggested that consonance was due to the coincidence of overtones, which was refined by David Cope in the concept of interval strength (1997), suggesting a similar measure (smaller coefficients are more consonant), but a different mechanism (overtones coinciding, rather than the fundamental waves themselves coinciding periodically).

== Works ==
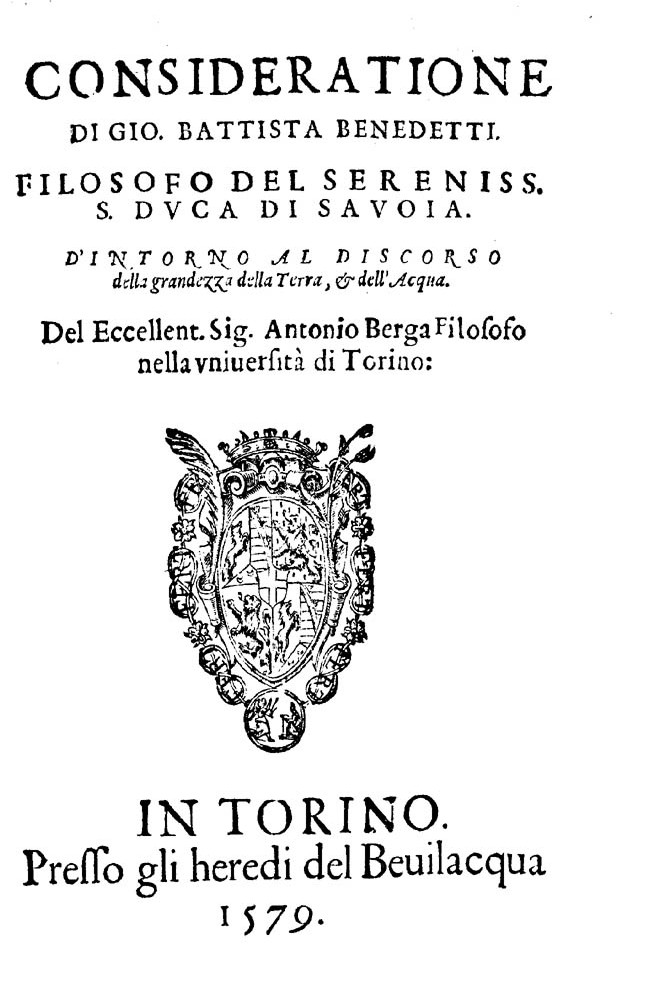
Consideratione d'intorno al discorso della grandezza della terra, e dell'acqua, 1579

- De gnomonum umbrarumque solarium usu (in Latin). Torino: eredi Niccolò Bevilacqua. 1574.
- Consideratione d'intorno al discorso della grandezza della terra, e dell'acqua (in Italian). Torino: eredi Niccolò Bevilacqua. 1579.
- Diversarum speculationum mathematicarum et physicarum liber (in Latin). Torino: eredi Niccolò Bevilacqua. 1585.
- Demonstratio proportionum (in Italian). Venezia: Istituto veneto di scienze lettere ed arti. 1985.
