= Petrus Peregrinus de Maricourt =

French mathematician, physicist, and writer

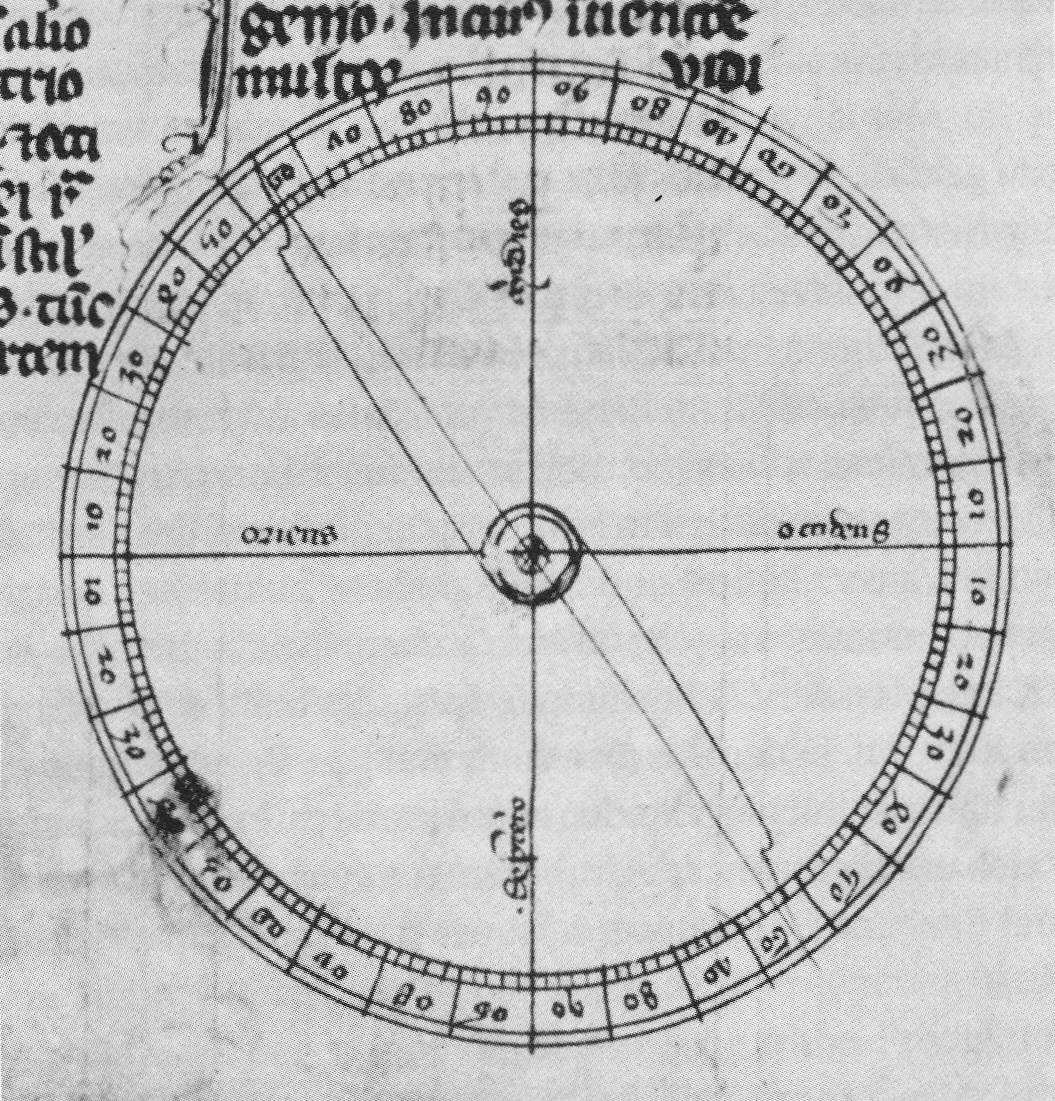
Pivoting compass needle in a 14th-century handcopy of Peter's Epistola de magnete (1269)

Petrus Peregrinus de Maricourt (Latin), Pierre Pelerin de Maricourt (French), or Peter Peregrinus of Maricourt (fl. 1269), was a French mathematician, physicist, and writer who conducted experiments on magnetism and wrote the first extant treatise describing the properties of magnets. His work is particularly noted for containing the earliest detailed discussion of freely pivoting compass needles, a fundamental component of the dry compass soon to appear in medieval navigation. He also wrote a treatise on the construction and use of a universal astrolabe.

Peregrinus's text on the magnet is entitled in many of the manuscripts of it Epistola Petri Peregrini de Maricourt ad Sygerum de Foucaucourt, militem, de magnete ("Letter of Peter Peregrinus of Maricourt to Sygerus of Foucaucourt, Soldier, on the Magnet") but it is more commonly known by its short title, Epistola de magnete ("Letter on the Magnet"). The letter is addressed to an otherwise unknown Picard countryman named Sygerus (Sigerus, Ysaerus) of Foucaucourt, possibly a friend and neighbor of the author; Foucaucourt borders on the home area of Peregrinus around Maricourt, in the present-day department of the Somme, near Péronne.

In only one of the 39 surviving manuscript copies the letter also bears the closing legend Actum in castris in obsidione Luceriæ anno domini 1269º 8º die augusti ("Done in camp during the siege of Lucera, August 8, 1269"), which might indicate that Peregrinus was in the army of Charles, duke of Anjou and king of Sicily, who in 1269 laid siege to the city of Lucera. However, given that only one manuscript attests this, the evidence is weak. There is no indication of why Peter received the sobriquet Peregrinus (or "pilgrim"), but it suggests that he may have been either a pilgrim at one point or a crusader; and the attack on Lucera of 1269 had been sanctioned as a crusade by the Pope. So Petrus Peregrinus may have served in that army.

"You must realize, dearest friend," Peregrinus writes, "that while the investigator in this subject must understand nature and not be ignorant of the celestial motions, he must also be very diligent in the use of his own hands, so that through the operation of this stone he may show wonderful effects."

== The content of the Epistola de magnete ==
In his letter of 1269, Peregrinus explains how to identify the poles of the compasses. He also describes the laws of magnetic attraction and repulsion. The letters also contain a description of an experiment with a repaired magnet, as well as a number of compasses, one of which "you will be able to direct your steps to cities and islands and to any place whatever in the world." Indeed, the increasing perfection of magnetic compasses during the thirteenth century allowed navigators such as Vandino and Ugolino Vivaldi to strike out on voyages to unknown lands.

The Epistola de magnete is divided into two parts. Part One (10 chapters): This is a section that serves as a model of inductive reasoning based on definite experiences, and setting forth the fundamental laws of magnetism. He did not discover these laws, but presented them in logical order. Part One discusses the physical (but not the occult) properties of the lodestone and provides the first extant written account of the polarity of magnets. He was thus the first to use the word "pole" in this context. He provides methods for determining the north and south poles of a magnet, and he describes the effects magnets have upon one another, showing that like poles repel each other and unlike poles attract each other. He also treats the attraction of iron by lodestones, the magnetization of iron by lodestones, and the ability to reverse the polarity in such an induced magnet. Peregrinus attributed the Earth's magnetism to the action of celestial poles, rather than to the terrestrial poles of the planet itself.

Part Two (three chapters): This section describes three devices that utilize the properties of magnets. He treats the practical applications of magnets, describing the "wet" floating compass as an instrument, and a "dry" pivoted compass in some detail. He also attempts to prove that with the help of magnets it is possible to realize perpetual motion (see History of perpetual motion machines). His device is a toothed wheel which passes near a lodestone so that the teeth are alternately attracted by one pole and repelled by the other.

== The universal astrolabe text ==
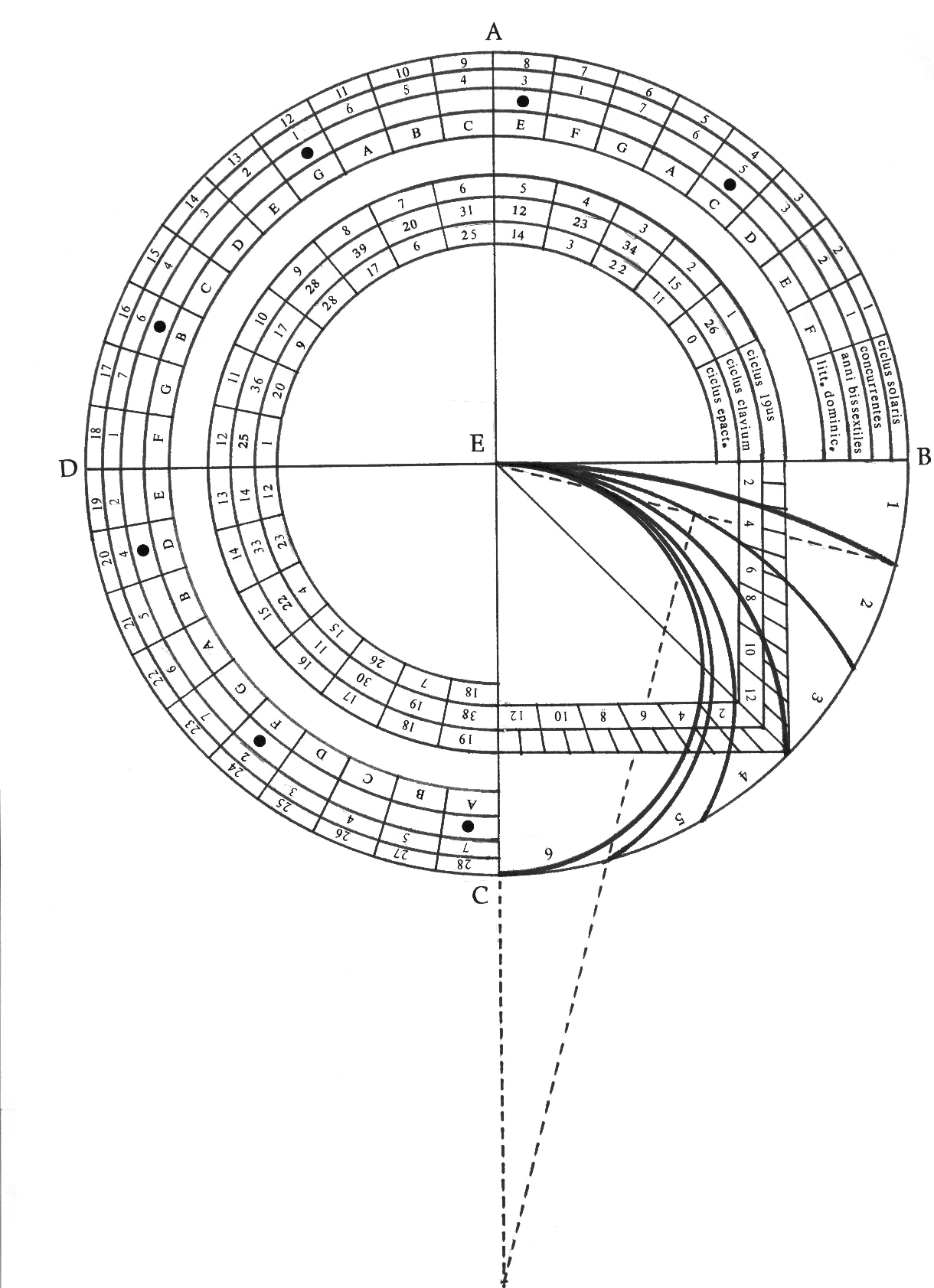
Part of the engraving on the back-side of de Maricourt's universal astrolabe

The Nova Compositio Astrolabii Particularis (found in only 4 manuscripts) describes the construction and use of a universal astrolabe which could be used at a variety of latitudes without changing the plates. Unlike al-Zarqālī's more famous universal astrolabe in which vertical halves the heavens were projected onto a plane through the poles, this one had both the northern and southern hemispheres projected onto a plane through the equator (which was also the limit of projection). There are no known surviving astrolabes based on this treatise. The use of such an astrolabe is very complicated, and since it is probable that most sophisticated users were not frequent travelers, they were more likely happier with the traditional (and simpler) stereographic planispheric astrolabe.

== Roger Bacon ==
The literature often mentions that Peregrinus was praised by Roger Bacon, who called him a "perfect mathematician" and one who valued experience over argument. But the association of the praise with Peregrinus appears only in a marginal gloss to Bacon's Opus tertium and only in one of the five manuscripts used in the critical edition, which leads us to conclude that it was a later comment added by someone else. That Bacon's praise was for Peregrinus is open to serious debate.

== Legacy ==
The influence of Peregrinus's astrolabe was virtually nil. His reputation derives mainly from his work on magnetism. The De magnete became a very popular work from the Middle Ages onwards, as witnessed by the large number of manuscript copies.

The first printed edition of it was issued at Augsburg, in 1558, by Achilles Gasser. In 1562, Jean Taisner published from the press of Johann Birkmann of Cologne a work entitled Opusculum perpetua memoria dignissimum, de natura magnetis et ejus effectibus, Item de motu continuo. This is considered a piece of plagiarism, as Taisnier presents, as though his own, the Epistola de magnete of Peregrinus and a treatise on the fall of bodies by Gianbattista Benedetti.

William Gilbert acknowledged his debt to Peregrinus and incorporated this thirteenth-century scientist's experiments on magnetism into his own treatise, called De magnete.

The Epistola de magnete was later issued by Guillaume Libri (Histoire des sciences mathématiques en Italie, vol 2 [Paris, 1838], pp. 487–505), but, based on only one manuscript, this edition was full of defects; corrected editions were published by Timoteo Bertelli (in Bulletino di bibliografia e di storia delle scienze matematiche e fisiche pubblicata da B. Boncampagni, 1 (1868), 70–80) and G. Hellmann (Rara magnetica 1269-1599 [Neudrucke von Schriften und Karten über Meteorologie und Erdmagnetismus, 10], [Berlin, 1898]) .

The modern critical edition was prepared by Loris Sturlese and appears in Petrus Peregrinus de Maricourt, Opera (Pisa, 1995), pp. 63–89.

A translation into English has been made by Silvanus P. Thompson ("Epistle of Peter Peregrinus of Maricourt, to Sygerus of Foucaucourt, Soldier, concerning the Magnet", [London: Chiswick Press, 1902]); by Brother Arnold [=Joseph Charles Mertens] ("The Letter of Petrus Peregrinus on the Magnet, A.D. 1269", with introductory note by Brother Potamian [= M. F. O'Reilly], [New York, 1904]); and H. D. Harradon, ("Some Early Contributions to the History of Geomagnetism - I," in Terrestrial Magnetism and Atmospheric Electricity [now Journal of Geophysical Research] 48 [1943], 3–17 [text pp. 6–17]).

The modern critical edition of the astrolabe text was prepared by Ron B. Thomson and appears in Petrus Peregrinus de Maricourt, Opera (Pisa, 1995), pp. 119–196.

The philosopher and scientist Charles S. Peirce made a thorough study the Epistle of Petrus Peregrinus on the lodestone (MS. No. 7378; See Eisele, C. (1957) The Charles S. Peirce-Simon Newcomb Correspondence. Proceedings of the American Philosophical Society, Vol. 101, No. 5. p. 411).

The European Geosciences Union (EGU) established the Petrus Peregrinus Medal in recognition for outstanding scientific contributions in the field of magnetism.

== See also ==
- History of geomagnetism
- History of electromagnetic theory
