= Arnold Caussin =

Flemish composer and choirmaster (c.1505–c.1558)

- Born: c. 1505; Ath, Hapsburg Netherlands
- Died: c. 1558
- Occupations: Composer, Choirmaster, Musician

Arnold Caussin, c. 1505 – c. 1558, was a Renaissance choirmaster, musician, and composer, who wrote a number of motets.

== Education ==
He was a student in the University of Krakow (1526), registered as "Arnoldus Caussin de Ath ex Hanoniensi Comitatu, Iusquin [des Prés] magnus musicus discipulus". He was a pupil of Josquin des Prez.
