= Belœil, Belgium =

Municipality in Hainaut Province, Wallonia, Belgium

Belœil Baileul (Picard)
- Municipality
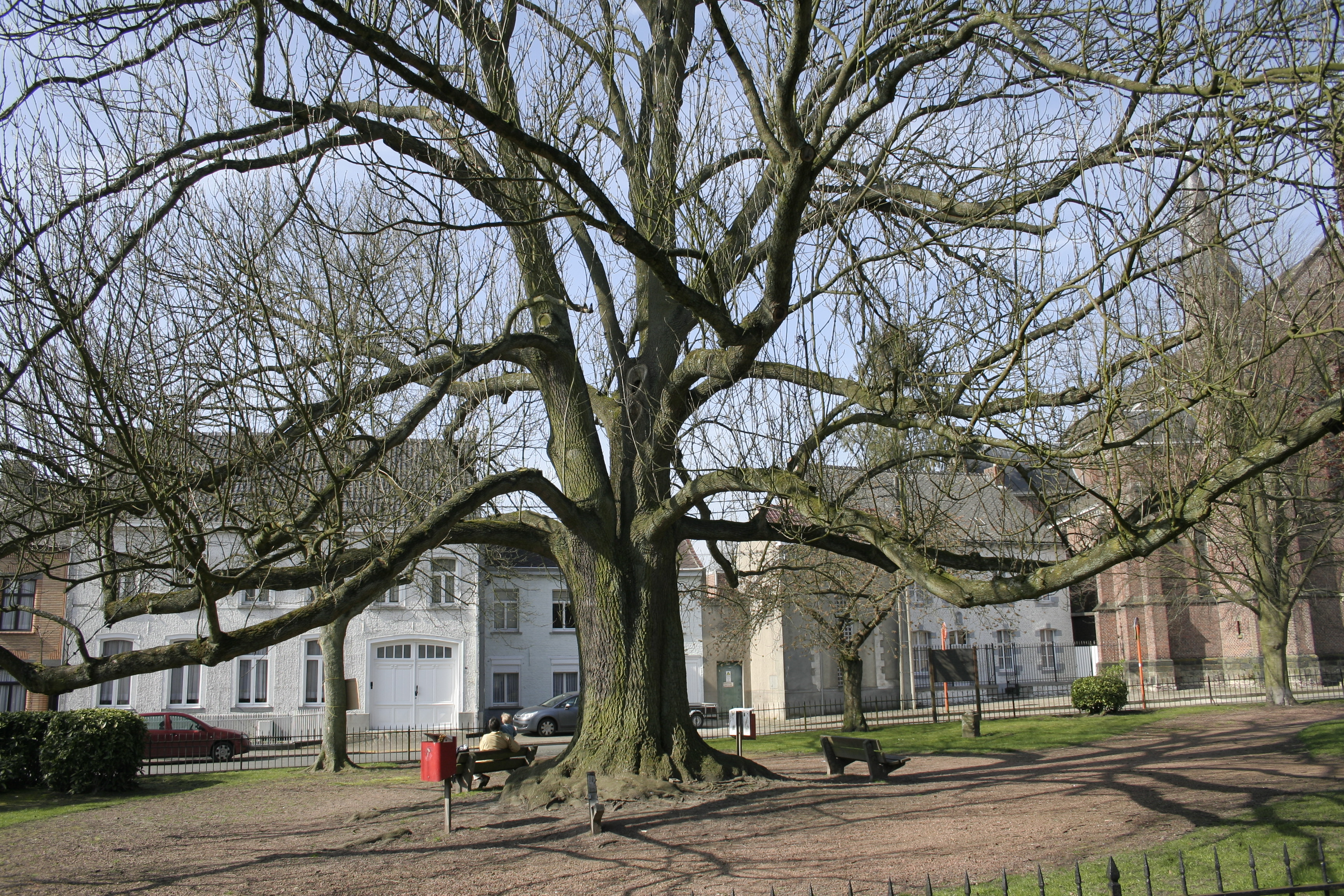
- Gossart Square

- Flag Coat of arms

- Location of Belœil in Hainaut
- Interactive map of Belœil
- Location in Belgium
- Coordinates: 50°32′N 03°43′E
- Country: Belgium
- Community: French Community
- Region: Wallonia
- Province: Hainaut
- Arrondissement: Ath

Government
  - Mayor: Bastien Marlot (MR)
  - Governing party: MR+ - PS

Area
  - Total: 62.26 km^{2} (24.04 sq mi)

Population (2024-01-01)
  - Total: 14,244
  - Density: 228.8/km^{2} (592.5/sq mi)
- Postal codes: 7970, 7971, 7972, 7973
- NIS code: 51008
- Area codes: 069
- Website: beloeil.be

Belœil (French pronunciation: [bɛlœj]; Picard: Baileul; Walloon: Beleul) is a municipality of Wallonia located in the province of Hainaut, Belgium.

It is around 10 km south of Ath. On 1 January 2024 the municipality had 14,244 inhabitants. The total area is 62.26 km^{2}, giving a population density of 229 inhabitants per km^{2}.

The municipality is named after the château of Belœil, once the seat of Charles-Joseph, 7th Prince of Ligne, a military officer and man of letters who corresponded with Jean-Jacques Rousseau and Voltaire.

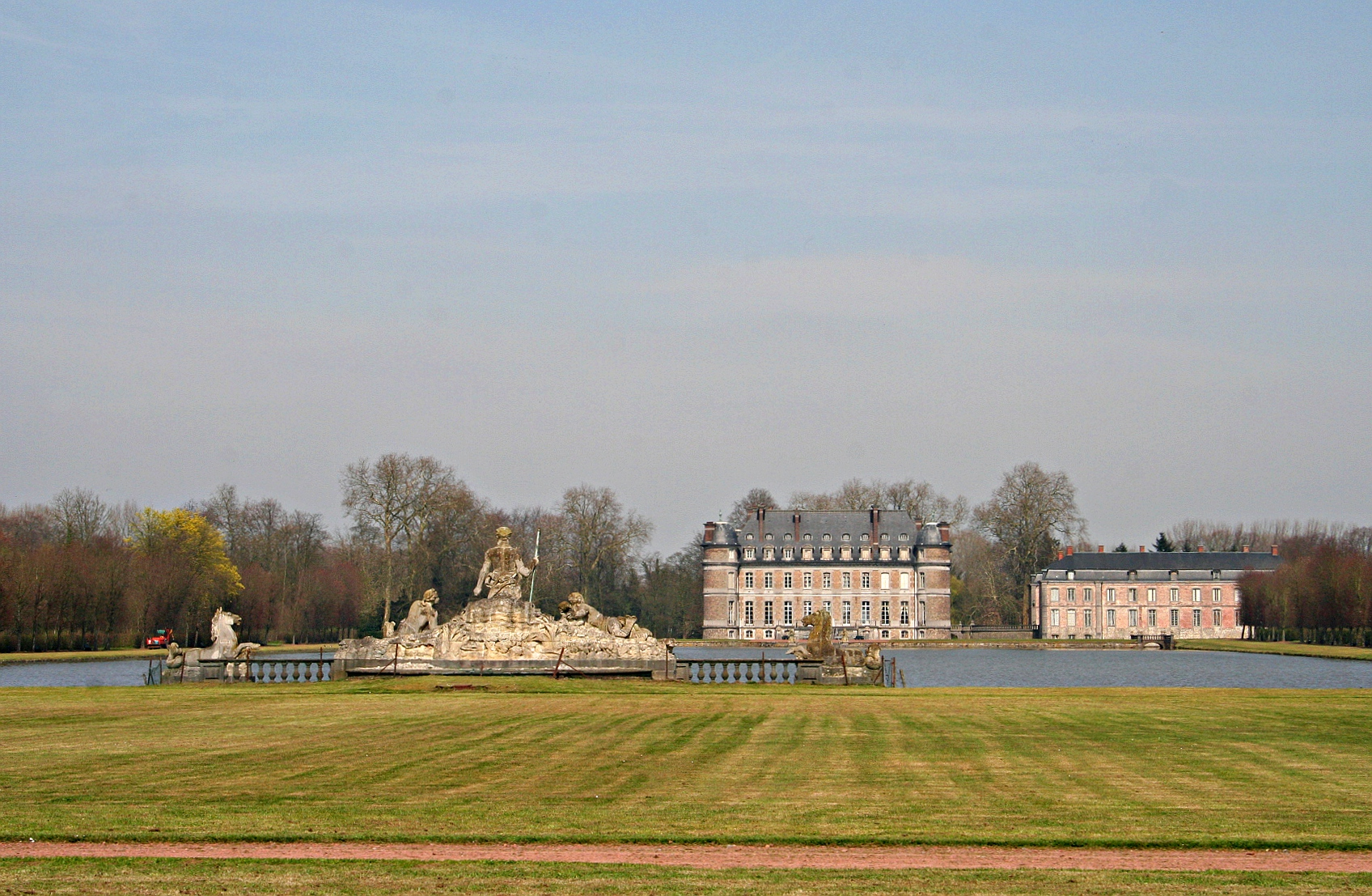
The park and the castle of the Princes of Ligne.

== Geography ==
=== Location ===
Both an agricultural and touristic municipality, Belœil spans an altitude ranging from 25 m in the west, near the E42 highway, to 95 m in the southeast, within the Stambruges forest.

It is crossed from south to northeast by the Blaton-Ath canal and is bordered at its far southern edge, on a small portion of its territory, by the Nimy-Blaton-Péronnes canal.

Belœil is also served from west to southeast by the N50 and to the south by the E42, due to its location 26 km from Tournai and 19 km from Mons.

=== Municipal sections ===
#	Name	Area (km²)	Population (2020)	Population per km²	NIS Code
1	Belœil	10.34	2,337	226	51008A
2	Stambruges	5.39	1,358	252	51008B0
3	Grandglise	5.92	1,136	192	51008B1
4	Quevaucamps	9.16	3,367	368	51008C
5	Basècles	8.67	3,511	405	51008D
6	Thumaide	4.24	484	114	51008E
7	Ramegnies	1.46	142	97	51008F
8	Wadelincourt	3.04	343	113	51008G
9	Ellignies-Sainte-Anne	11.27	1,211	107	51008H
10	Aubechies	2.82	168	60	51008J

== History ==
The history of the chateau is nebulous but the original construction of a fort or castle at the site is generally thought to date to the 14th century. This site was the seat of the barons of the Ligne family originating from Ligne in Hainaut, a place about 8 kilometres from Beloeil. The earliest recorded baron of the House of Ligne was Fastré de Ligne, signatory to a charter dated 1047 and others of the name mentioned in a charter of Baudouin IV, count of Hainaut, dated to 1123.

=== Postal history ===
Post-offices opening dates before 1910:

- Beloeil on 28 June 1858. It used a Distribution postal code 8 with bars (before 1864), and 35 with points before 1874. - Basècles on 21 April 1862. It used a Distribution postal code 126 with bars (before 1864), and 30 with points before 1874. - Quevaucamps on 13 March 1876. - Stambruges on 12 November 1888. - Ramegnies-Chin on 27 June 1896.

Postal codes in 1969:

- Aubechies 7672 - Basècles 7660 - Beloeil 7970 - Ellignies-Sainte-Anne 7671 - Quevaucamps 7670 - Ramegnies 7663 - Ramegnies-Chin 7721 - Stambruges 7980 - Thumaide 7662 - Wadelincourt 7661

Since at least October 1990: - 7520 Ramegnies-Chin - 7970 Beloeil - 7971 Basècles, Ramegnies, Thumaide, Wadelincourt - 7972 Aubechies, Ellignies-Sainte-Anne, Quevaucamps - 7973 Grandglise, Stambruges

== Famous inhabitants ==
Apart from many members of the House of Ligne, living in the castle, other famous people to have lived here include:

- Émilie Dequenne, actress
- Pierre Descamps, politician
- Baron Empain, entrepreneur and Egyptologist

== Twin towns ==
- Crosne, France
- (United Kingdom) Maybole, Scotland
- Schotten, Germany
