= Houtaing =

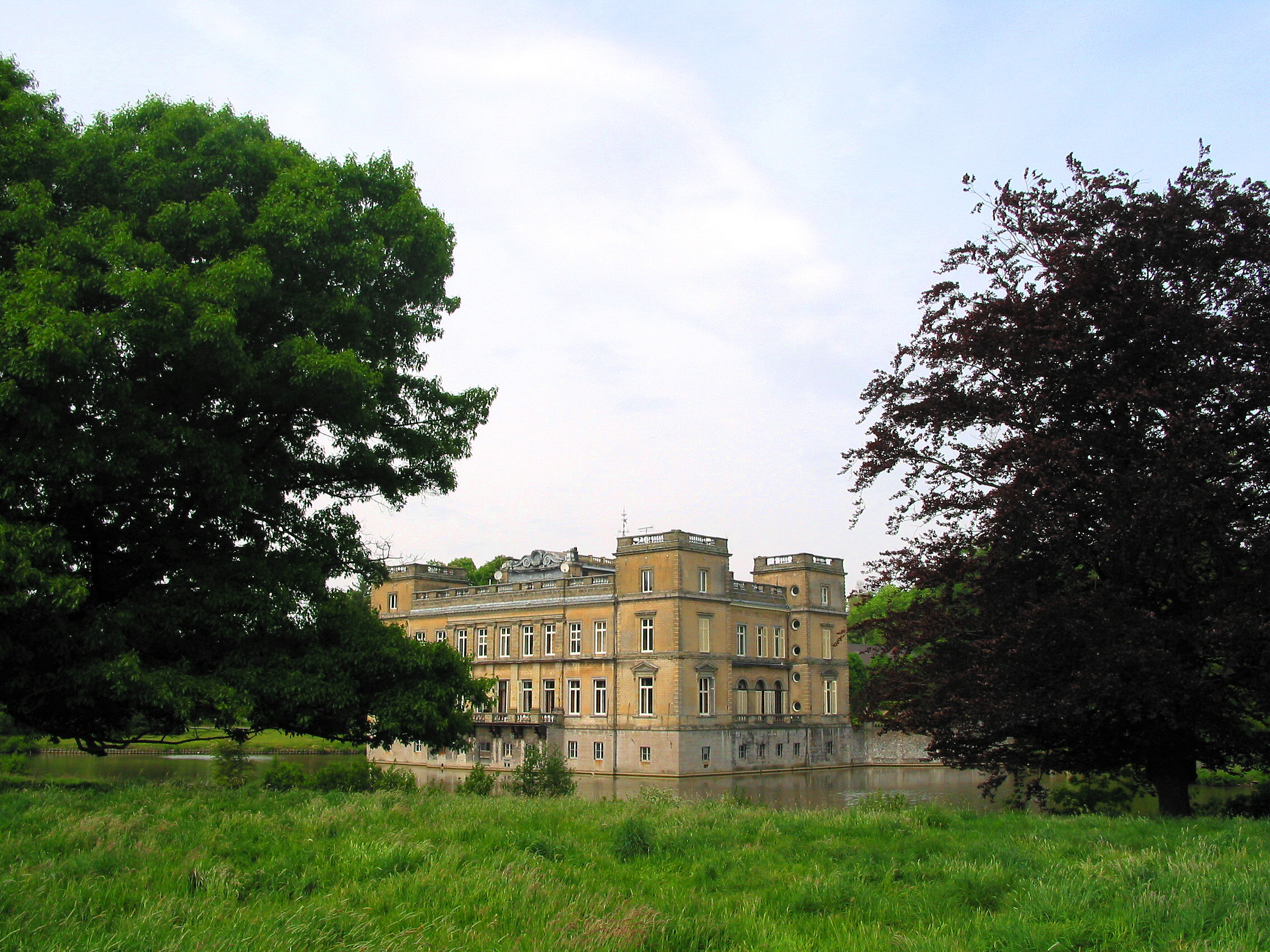
- Château de la Berlière, Houtaing

- Location within Belgium Location within Europe
- Coordinates: 50°38′17″N 03°40′50″E
- Country: Belgium
- Region: Wallonia
- Province: Hainaut
- Municipality: Ath

Houtaing is a village and district of the municipality of Ath, located in the Hainaut Province in Wallonia, Belgium.

The earliest mention of the village is in a document dated 847, listing properties of the Saint-Amand Abbey in present-day France. Later it became a feudal fief. The current Château de la Berlière in Houtaing dates from 1793, by architect Antoine Payen the Elder, and replaced an earlier castle.
