= Irchonwelz =

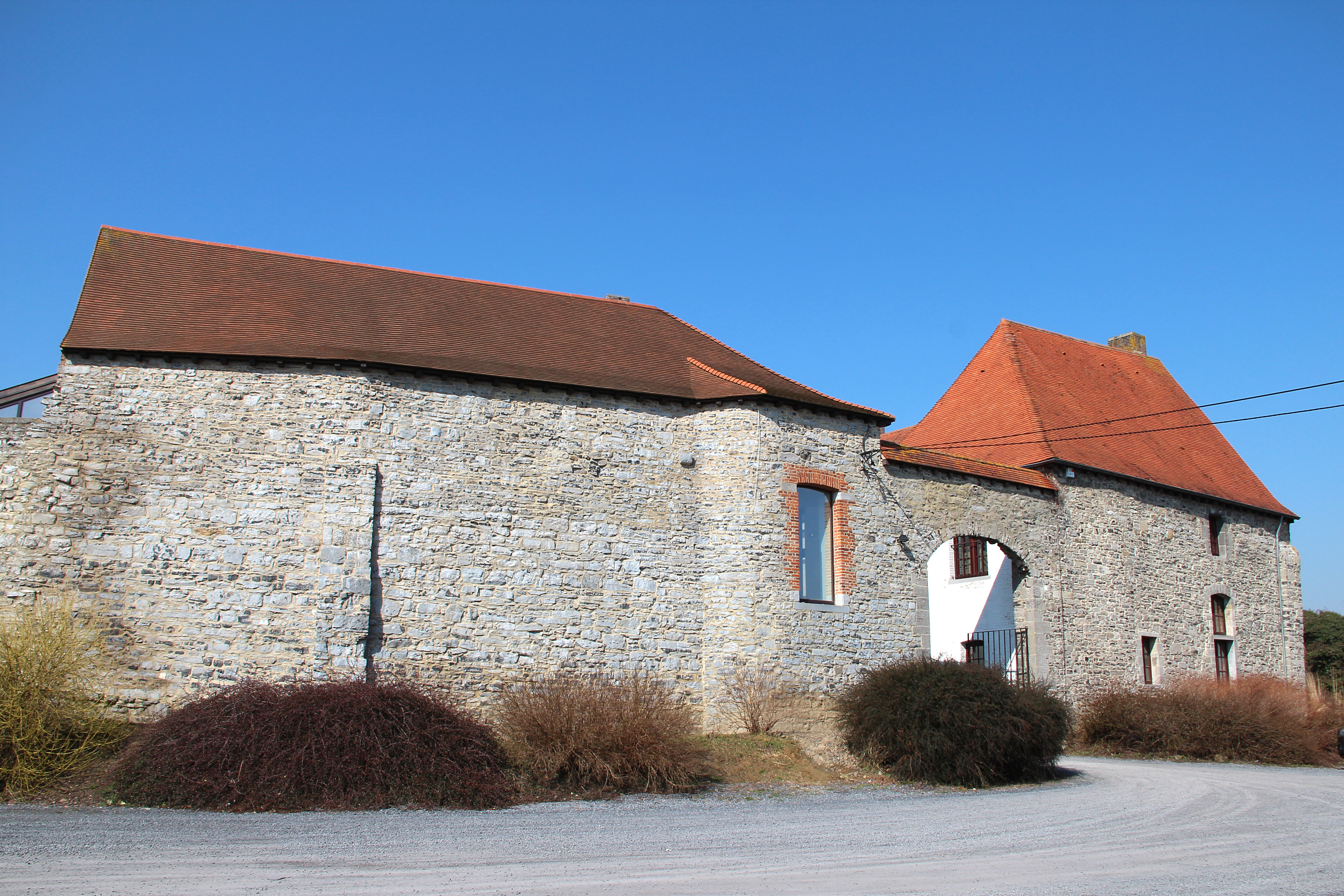
- Former castle, now a brewery, in Irchonwelz

- Location within Belgium Location within Europe
- Coordinates: 50°37′00″N 03°45′00″E
- Country: Belgium
- Region: Wallonia
- Province: Hainaut
- Municipality: Ath

Irchonwelz is a village and district of the municipality of Ath, located in the Hainaut Province in Wallonia, Belgium.

The history of the village goes back to at least the 13th centre, when ownership of the land was transferred from the Bishop of Cambrai to the Abbey of Ghislenghien. Later, it passed to the de Trazegnies family. During the 18th century, the village developed into a rural suburb of Ath. An old castle, dating from the 13th century, once belonged to the de Trazegnies family and is still partially preserved; today it houses a brewery. Another historical stately home, a manor built in the 17th century, also exists in Irchonwelz.
