= Aux arbres citoyens =

Single by Yannick Noah

from the album Charango
- B-side: "Danser"
- Released: 12 February 2007
- Genre: Pop, R&B
- Length: 3:18 (album version)
- Label: Columbia
- Songwriters: Christophe Battaglia; Cyril Tarquiny
- Producer: Christophe Battaglia

Yannick Noah singles chronology
"Donne-moi une vie" (2006)	"Aux arbres citoyens" (2007)	"Destination ailleurs" (2007)

"Aux arbres citoyens" is a 2007 song recorded by French singer Yannick Noah. It was his second single from his successful album Charango, on which it features as third track, and his 12th single overall. Released in February 2007, the song became a hit in France, where it was Noah's first number-one hit, and in Belgium (Wallonia).

== Song information ==
The song was written by Yannick Noah and the music composed by Christophe Battaglia and Cyril Tarquiny. The title refers to the line Aux armes, citoyens! in the chorus of La Marseillaise but the words 'aux armes' ('to arms') are replaced by 'aux arbres' ('to the trees'), because the song deals with an ecological theme, explaining in the lyrics the need to mobilize to find solutions. The music video was produced as an animated feature and illustrates the lyrics.

The song was included on many French compilations, such as Hit Connection – Best of 2007, NRJ Summer Hits Only 2007, Été 2007 and M6 Hits.

On French TV show La Chanson de l'année, hosted by Flavie Flament on TF1 on 1 June 2007, "Aux arbres citoyens" was awarded "Song of the Year" thanks to an exclusive poll directed by the IFOP, among about 50 songs released in 2007.

In France, the single went straight to number-one on 17 February 2007, and stayed there for three weeks. It totaled 12 weeks in the top ten and 20 weeks in the top 50. It fell off the chart (top 100) after 26 weeks.

The single entered the Belgian chart at No. 28 on 17 February 2007, climbed regularly and finally peaked at No. 2 in its eighth and ninth week. It stayed for 12 weeks in the top ten and 26 weeks on the chart, becoming Noah's second longest chart trajectory for one of his singles in Belgium (Wallonia).

== Track listings ==
CD single

1. "Aux arbres citoyens" (radio edit) – 2:55
2. "Danser" – 3:00
3. "Aux arbres citoyens" (video)

Digital download

1. "Aux arbres citoyens" (album version) – 3:18

CD single – Promo

1. "Aux arbres citoyens" (radio edit) – 2:55

== Charts ==
Chart (2007)	Peak position
Belgian (Wallonia) Singles Chart	2
Eurochart Hot 100	3
French SNEP Singles Chart	1
Swiss Singles Chart	41

End of year chart (2007)	Position
Belgian (Wallonia) Singles Chart	14
French Digital Chart	29
French Singles Chart	7

== Certifications ==
Certifications for "Aux arbres citoyens"
Region	Certification	Certified units/sales
France (SNEP)	Silver	100,000^{*}
^{*} Sales figures based on certification alone.
