= Johannes Dryander =

German academic

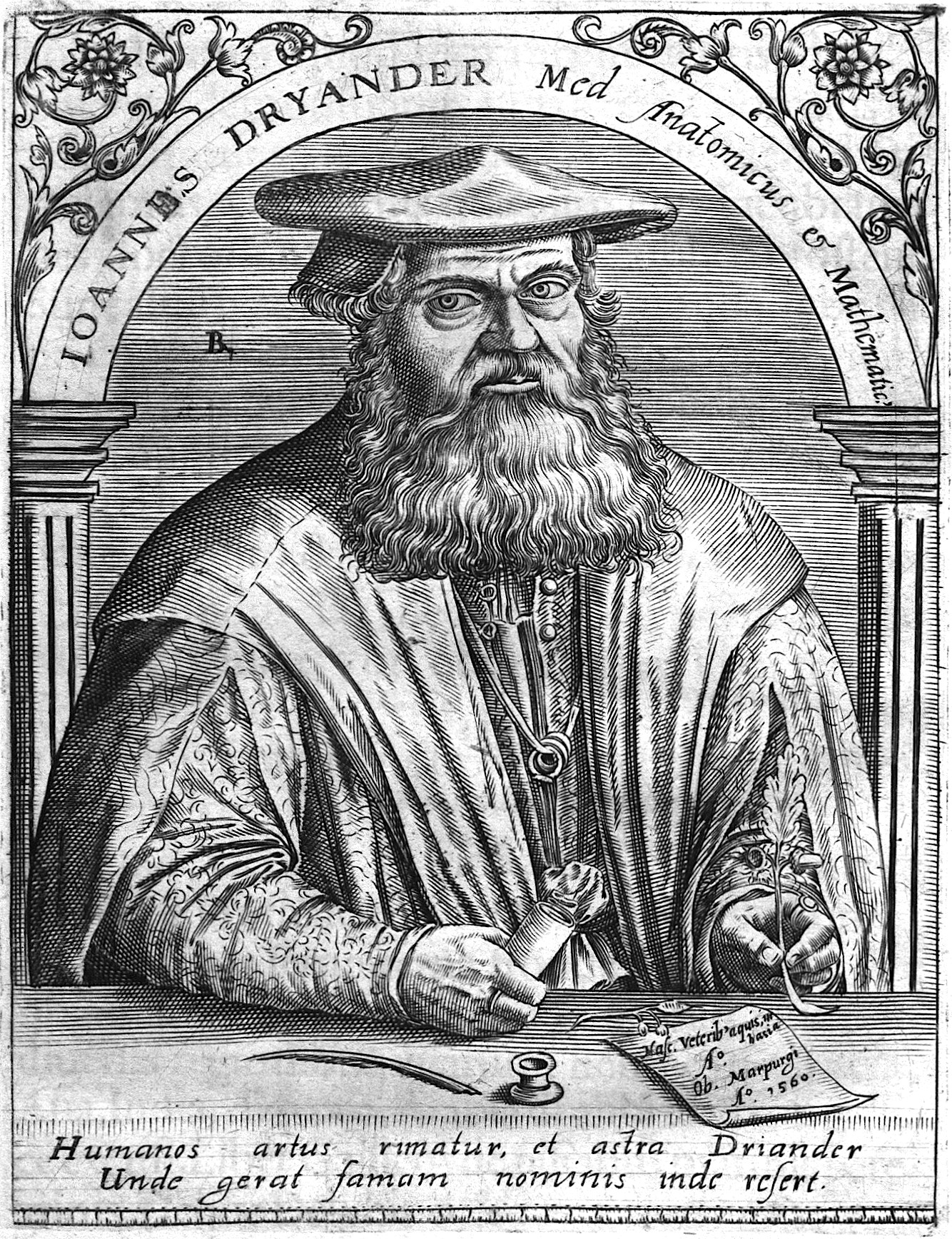
Johannes Dryander portrait

Johannes Dryander, also known as Johannes Eichmann (1500-1560), was an academic.

== Biography ==
Dryander was born in Wetter, Holy Roman Empire as Johannes Eichmann. He studied anatomy and medicine at the University of Paris and the University of Erfurt from 1528 to 1534 before becoming a professor of medicine at the University of Marburg in 1535.

Dryander held two public dissections in the following year and authored the first text illustrating a Galenic dissection of the human brain in 1536. His Anatomiae pars prior, an expanded edition published in 1537, marked a significant transition from medieval scholasticism to the precise observations of Andreas Vesalius.

Dryander's books featured detailed illustrations of the brain, skull, and cranial sutures, reflecting his personal use of dissections. His translation of Mundinus' anatomy in 1542 drew the ire of the anatomist as it plagiarized a portion of Vesalius' Tabulae sex. He continued his work on astrology and mathematics until his death in 1560.

His early books, as products of rational scientific thought, contributed significantly to the development of modern anatomy.
