= Arbre, Ath =

Arbre
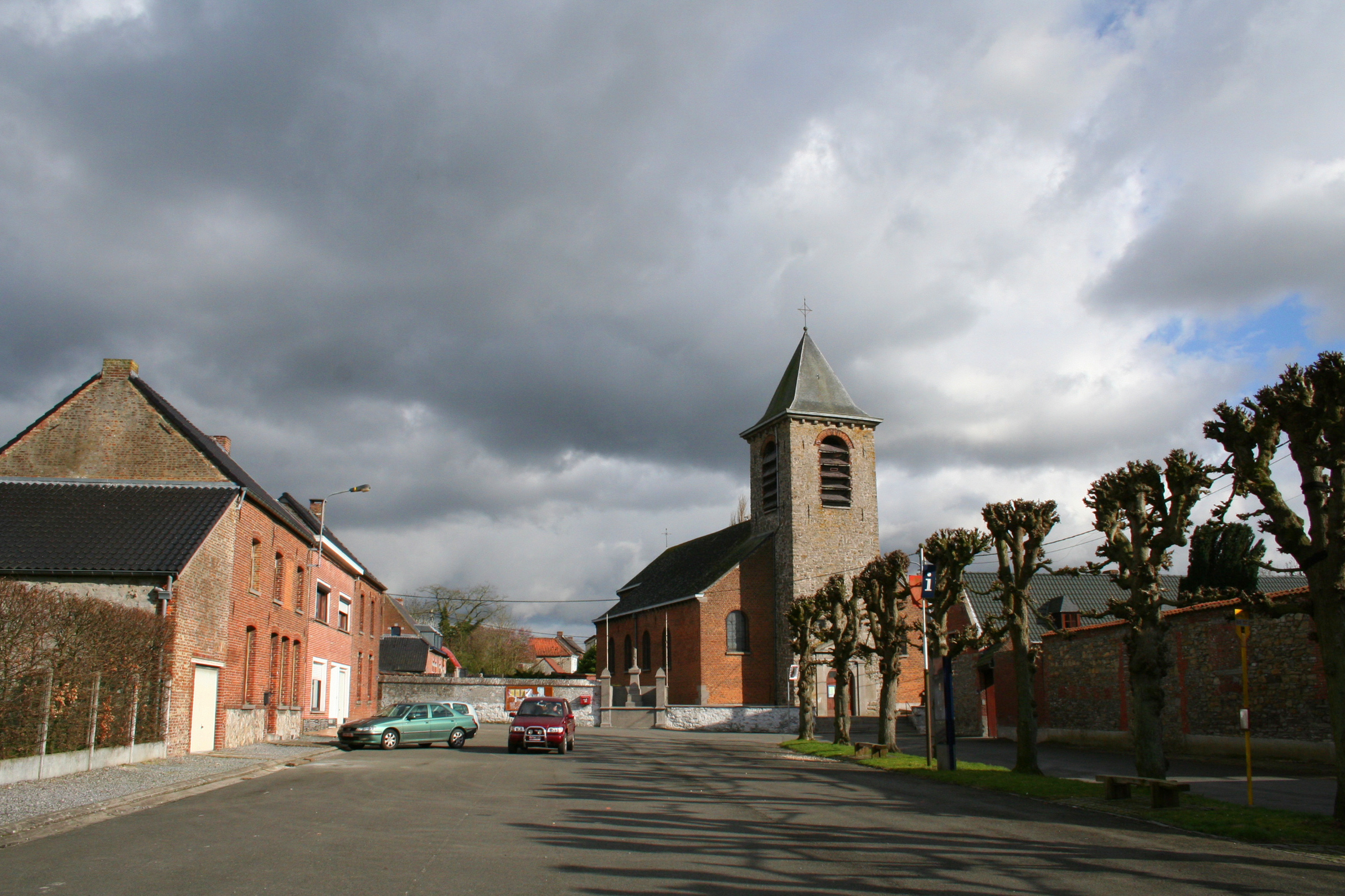
- Arbre

- Location within Belgium Location within Europe
- Coordinates: 50°36′00″N 03°48′00″E
- Country: Belgium
- Region: Wallonia
- Province: Hainaut
- Municipality: Ath

Arbre is a village and district of the municipality of Ath, located in the Hainaut Province in Wallonia, Belgium.

During the Middle Ages the village was a fief; the knight Methieu d'Arbre and his son Hugues distinguished themselves during the Crusades. A castle once existed in the village but only a few traces remains today. The village church was built in 1835, but the tower stems from an earlier building from the 16th century.
