= Aubechies =

Aubechies Obechî (Picard)
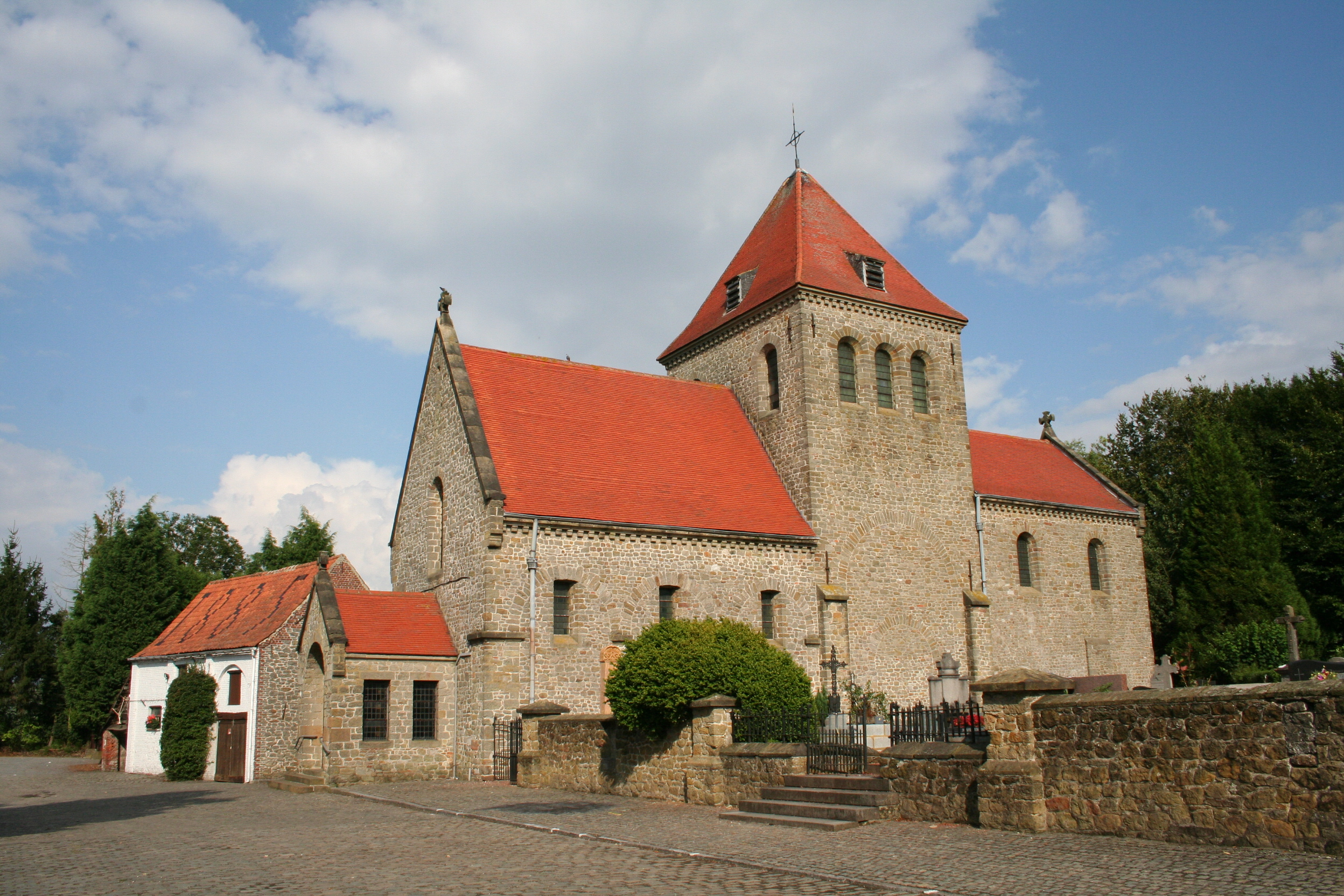
- The church of Saint-Géry in Aubechies

- Location in Belgium
- Coordinates: 50°34′N 03°40′E
- Country: Belgium
- Region: Wallonia
- Province: Hainaut
- Municipality: Belœil

Aubechies (Picard: Obechî) is a village of Wallonia and a district of the municipality of Belœil, located in the province of Hainaut, Belgium.

Aubechies is a member of the Les Plus Beaux Villages de Wallonie ("The Most Beautiful Villages of Wallonia") association. The Archeosite and Museum of Aubechies is located in Aubechies. A museum dedicated to the period of history from pre-history until Roman times, it is the largest archaeological open-air museum in Belgium. The village has a Romanesque village church dedicated to Saint Géry, a town hall and a school. It is a typical example of Wallonian villages in this area.
