= Ath =

City in Hainaut Province, Wallonia, Belgium

Ath: Ât (Picard); Aat (Dutch)
- Municipality
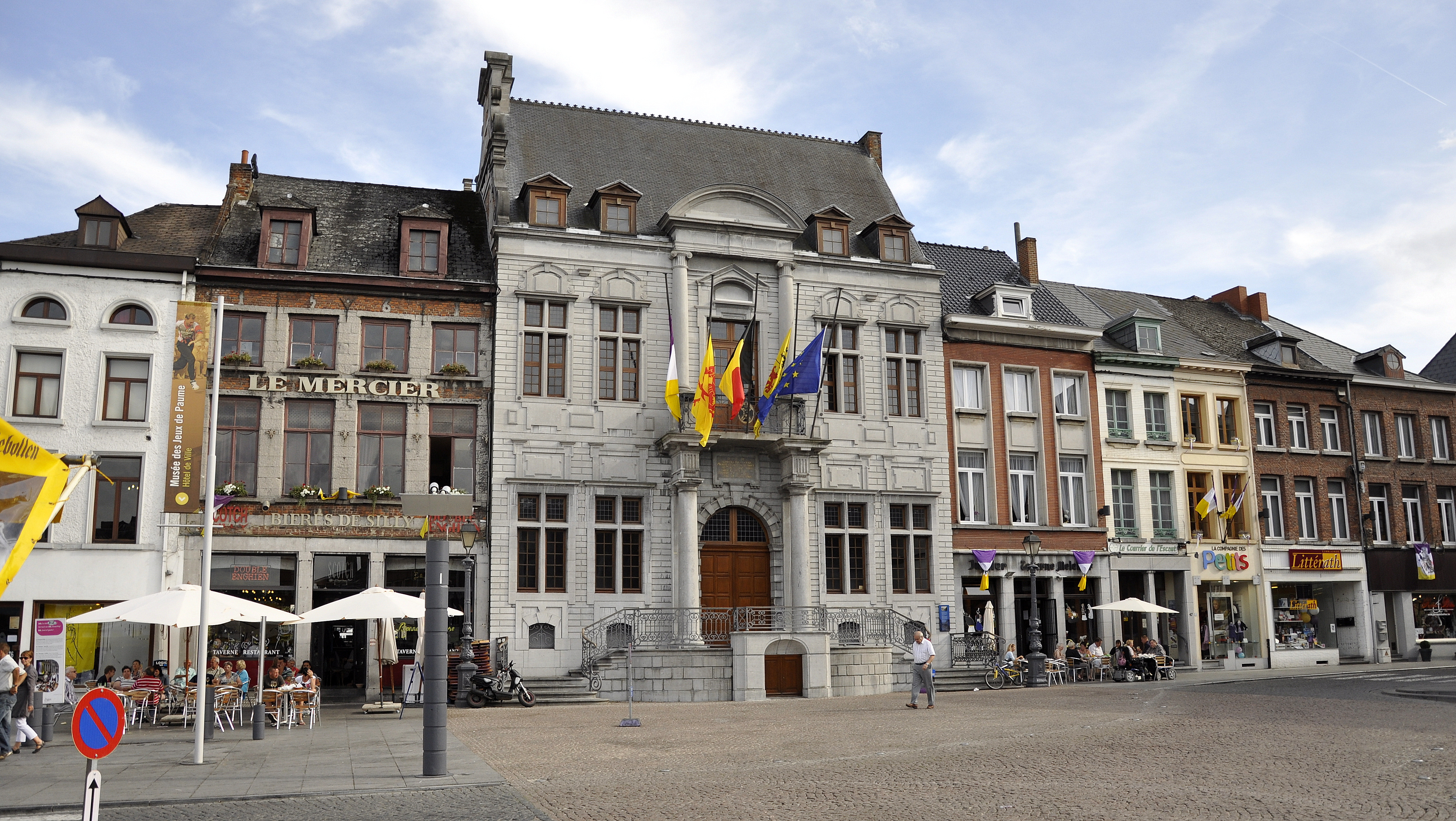
- Ath City Hall

- Flag Coat of arms

- Location of Ath in Hainaut
- Interactive map of Ath
- Location in Belgium
- Coordinates: 50°37′N 03°46′E
- Country: Belgium
- Community: French Community
- Region: Wallonia
- Province: Hainaut
- Arrondissement: Ath

Government
  - Mayor: Florent Van Grootenbrulle (PS)
  - Governing party: PS-MR

Area
  - Total: 127.9 km^{2} (49.4 sq mi)

Population (2018-01-01)
  - Total: 29,164
  - Density: 228.0/km^{2} (590.6/sq mi)
- Postal codes: 7800, 7801, 7802, 7803, 7804, 7810, 7811, 7812, 7822, 7823
- NIS code: 51004
- Area codes: 068
- Website: www.ath.be

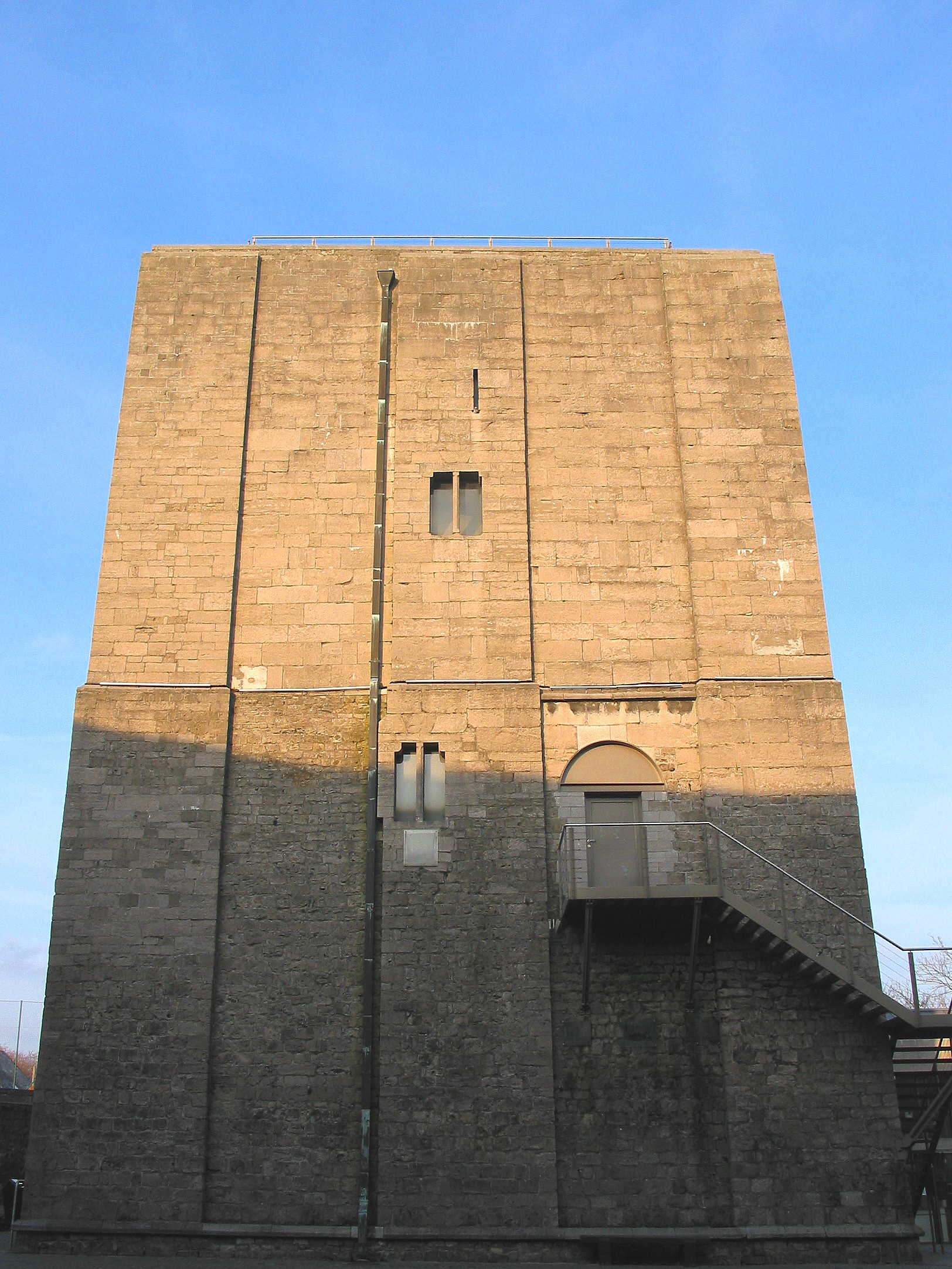
The Burbant tower

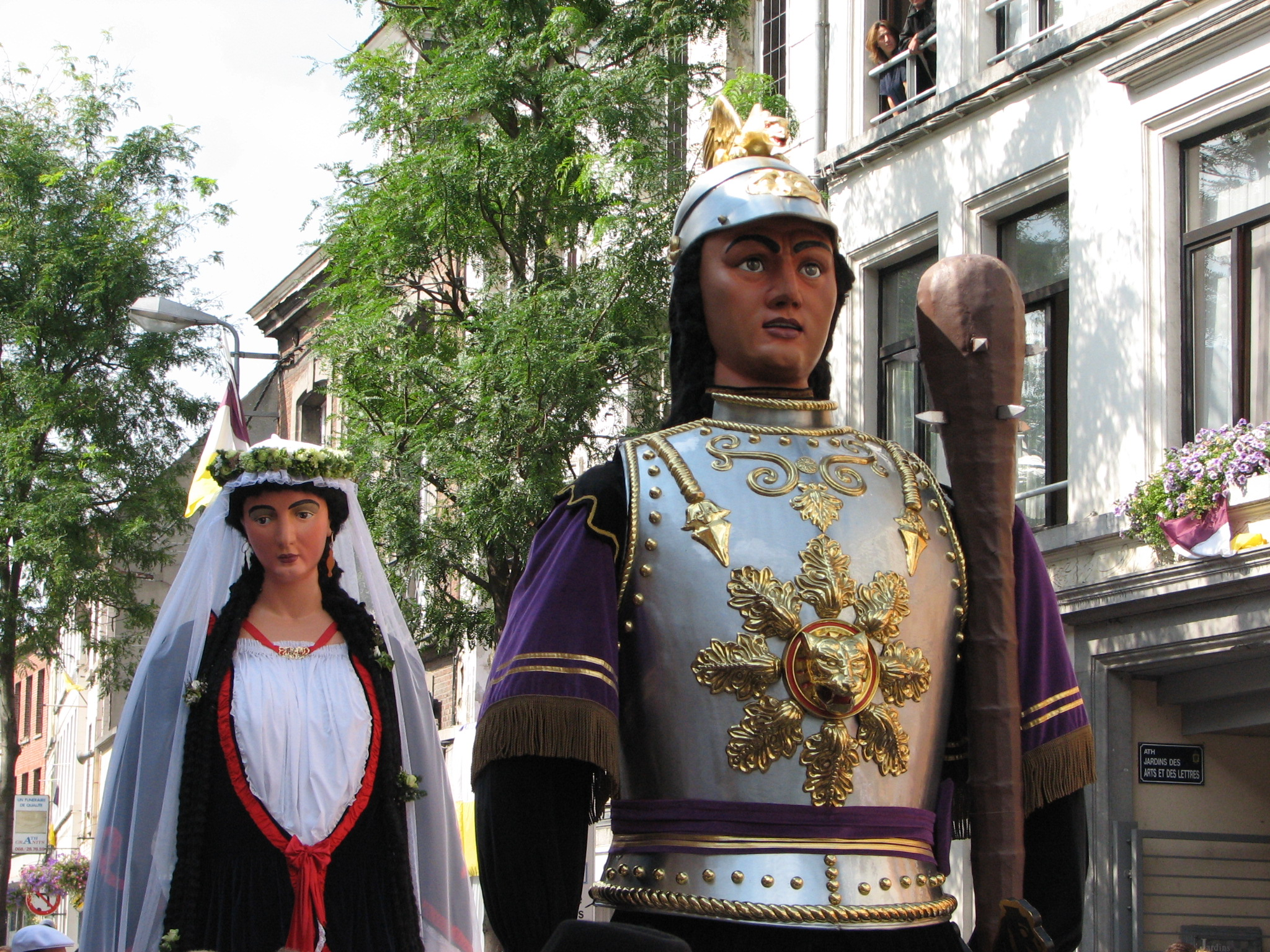
The procession of Giants - Goliath and his wife

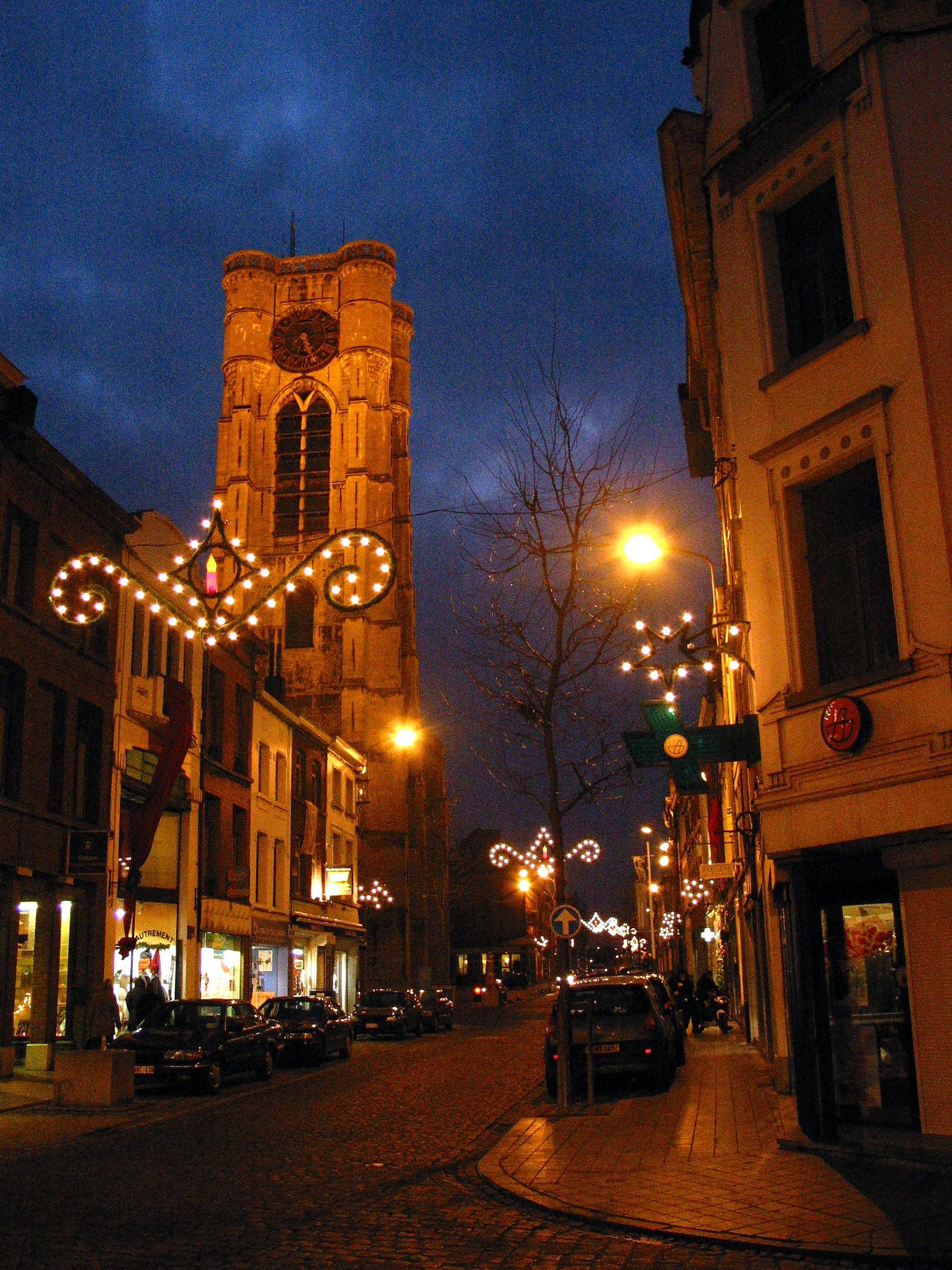
The bell tower of St. Julien's church

Ath (French pronunciation: [at]; Dutch: Aat, Dutch pronunciation: [aːt]; Picard: Ât; Walloon: Ate) is a city and municipality of Wallonia located in the province of Hainaut, Belgium.

The municipality consists of the following districts: Arbre, Ath, Bouvignies, Ghislenghien, Gibecq, Houtaing, Irchonwelz, Isières, Lanquesaint, Ligne, Maffle, Mainvault, Meslin-l'Évêque, Moulbaix, Ormeignies, Ostiches, Rebaix, Villers-Notre-Dame, and Villers-Saint-Amand.

Ath is known as the "City of Giants" after the Ducasse d'Ath festivities which take place every year on the fourth weekend in August. Huge figures representing Goliath, Samson, and other allegoric figures are paraded through the streets, and Goliath's wedding and his famous fight with David are re-enacted.

Ath is the point of origin of the river Dender from the merger of its Eastern and Western branches.

== History ==
=== Toponymy ===
The name Athum is attested first in 1076. Other spellings include Aat and Aeth. It may refer to a fortified place on a ford (Celtic origin; cf. Irish name of Dublin, Baile Átha Cliath, where Átha clearly means the ford, as oft-elsewhere in Ireland where there is a river to cross).

=== Pre–1500 ===
Archeological records show the existence of several Gallo-Roman settlements in the Ath area. The origin of the city of Ath, however, dates from around 1160, when Count Baudouin IV of Hainaut, bought some territory from his liegeman, Gilles de Trazegnies. A few years later, Baldwin built the Burbant Tower – which can still be seen today – to protect his new acquisition. The new city was soon given privileges and its newly built (1325) market hall on the Grand-Place began to attract residents.

Ath was the setting of the "Peace of Ath", signed on 4 June 1357 to end the question of the Brabant succession. By then, the weekly Ath market, which took place – and still takes place – on Thursdays, had started attracting sellers from a much larger region. The production of linen, cloth, hide, and luxury items such as gold ware, cabinets, and sculptures was growing fast. The population growth necessitated the building of a second wall, which was completed at the end of the 14th century. In 1416, the city built a school for the study of Latin, which Justus Lipsius attended. The city counted then about 5,000 people.

=== 1501–present ===
In 1667, Ath was conquered in a single day by the army of Louis XIV and became the first French city of the Spanish Netherlands. Soon after, Vauban built new fortifications, which included eight bastions. The city suffered again at the hands of the French army in 1745. At the end of the 18th century, Ath counted about 7,300 inhabitants but the population count decreased in the first half of the 19th century.

In 1816, two military engineering surveys concluded that Ath defences should be improved, the British survey recommended a garrison of 3,000 troops and the building cost would be £143,599. The Dutch wished to spend an additional £266,000. The Duke of Wellington agreed to the Dutch plan. The funding was paid for by England (30%), Holland (30%) and by French war reparations (40%). In 1824, the Dutch under King William I, built the Féron Fort, and the city once more gained strategic value.

A treaty drafted in London on 15 November 1831, which the Netherlands refused to sign, was followed by the Treaty of London (1839), which created the Kingdom of Belgium. Part of the terms of the treaty required the fort, amongst others, to be dismantled.

The freed up land assisted the town for the activities of a growing population. A new growth period took place between 1850 and 1914 driven by the forestry, agricultural (breweries, mills) and textile industries.

In the 20th century, most of these industries went into decline and were replaced by commercial, administrative and educational activities. In the last 30 years, several neighbourhoods have been revitalized and developed, and the city's monuments renovated or restored.

=== 30 July 2004 explosions ===
The Ghislenghien industrial park near Ath was the scene of one of Belgium's worst ever industrial disasters on 30 July 2004. Around 8:30 am local time, workers constructing a new factory for abrasives firm Diamant Boart (a subsidiary of the Electrolux Group) reported a strong smell of gas. It is believed the gas was escaping from a high-pressure underground pipeline conveying natural gas from Zeebrugge to France, operated by gas transportation company Fluxys. Firefighters were soon on the scene and were attempting to clear the area when at least two explosions occurred at around 9:00 am. The strongest of these demolished the partly built Diamant Boart structure, and fires were started in several other buildings. 24 people were killed, with over 120 injured. Five volunteer firemen and one police officer were among the dead.

== Sights ==
- The 12th-century Burbant tower was built by Baudouin IV and named after the neighbouring Landgraviate of Brabant.
- The town hall dates from the 17th century.
- The church of Saint Julien, rebuilt after a fire in the 19th century, still keeps a Gothic tower and apsidal chapel, as well as a famous 16th-century carillon.
- The church of Saint Martin and the exterior oak calvary both date from the 16th century.

== Festivities ==
The “Ducasse” originated from a yearly procession developed in the 15th century (first mentioned in 1399) as a celebration of the consecration of the local Saint Julien church. This procession illustrated stories from the Old Testament, New Testament, Golden Legend, and Carolingian cycle. Today, the “Ducasse” is a very popular celebration that includes various festivities and lasts several days spanning the end of August and beginning of September. The highlight is the cortege of giants (in French: Cortège des géants), with David and Goliath as the most famous characters. In 2008, the Ducasse was listed by UNESCO among the Masterpieces of the Oral and Intangible Heritage of Humanity. It was delisted in 2022 following complaints about one of the characters that appears in the procession: a 'savage', depicted by a white person in blackface, wearing a nose ring and chains.

== Transportation ==
Ath is located along the N56 road.

== People born in Ath ==
- Arnold Caussin, born about 1510. Musician, composer. Student in the University of Cracow in 1526.
- Michael Baius, theologian
- Julien-Joseph Ducorron, painter (1770–1848)
- Eugène Defacqz, politician (1797–1871)
- Jean Taisner, musician, mathematician and astrologer (1508-1562)
- Louis Hennepin, Catholic priest and missionary, and explorer of the interior of North America (17th century).
- Fanny Heldy, opera soprano (19th century)
- Joseph Jules Descamps, politician (1820–1892).
- Henri Vernes, novelist (20th century)
- Guy Spitaels, politician (20th century)
- Pierre Descamps, politician (20th century)
- Julian the Hospitaller, legendary saint, was according to one tradition born in Ath
- Jacques de Saint-Luc, lutenist and composer (1616 – c. 1710)
