= Peacock (Fabergé egg) =

1908 Imperial Fabergé Egg

Peacock Fabergé egg
- Year delivered: 1908
- Customer: Nicholas II
- Recipient: Maria Feodorovna

Current owner
- Individual or institution: Edouard and Maurice Sandoz Foundation, Lausanne, Switzerland
- Year of acquisition: 1955

Design and materials
- Workmaster: Semion Lvovich Dorofeiev
- Materials used: Gold, silver, diamonds, rubies, rock crystal
- Height: 190 millimetres (7.5 in)
- Width: 165 millimetres (6.5 in)
- Surprise: Gold and enamelled automaton peacock

The Peacock egg is a jewel and rock crystal Easter egg made by Dorofeiev under the supervision of the Russian jeweller Peter Carl Fabergé in 1908. It was made for Nicholas II of Russia, who presented the Fabergé egg to his mother, the Dowager Empress Maria Feodorovna, in 1908.

The transparent egg is composed of rock crystal and gilt silver wire, and is quite simple in style. The genius of the egg lay in its surprise. The egg is held together by a clasp at the top, and when opened, falls into two halves, each with a rococo style mount.

== Surprise ==
Inside the egg sits a small 110 millimetres (4.3 in) long mechanical gold and enamelled peacock in the branches of an engraved gold tree with flowers made of enamel and precious stones. The peacock can be lifted from within the tree and wound up. Placed on a flat surface, it struts around, moving its head and spreads and closes his enamel tail.

Semion Lvovich Dorofeiev, a Fabergé workmaster, reportedly worked on the peacock and its prototypes for three years. The surprise is based on the walking peacocks by Roullet et Decamps, a Parisian automaton maker specialised in the crafting of automaton animals. Unlike Fabergé's, the one in the Peacock Clock, which was the source of inspiration for the egg as a whole, does not walk.

== History ==
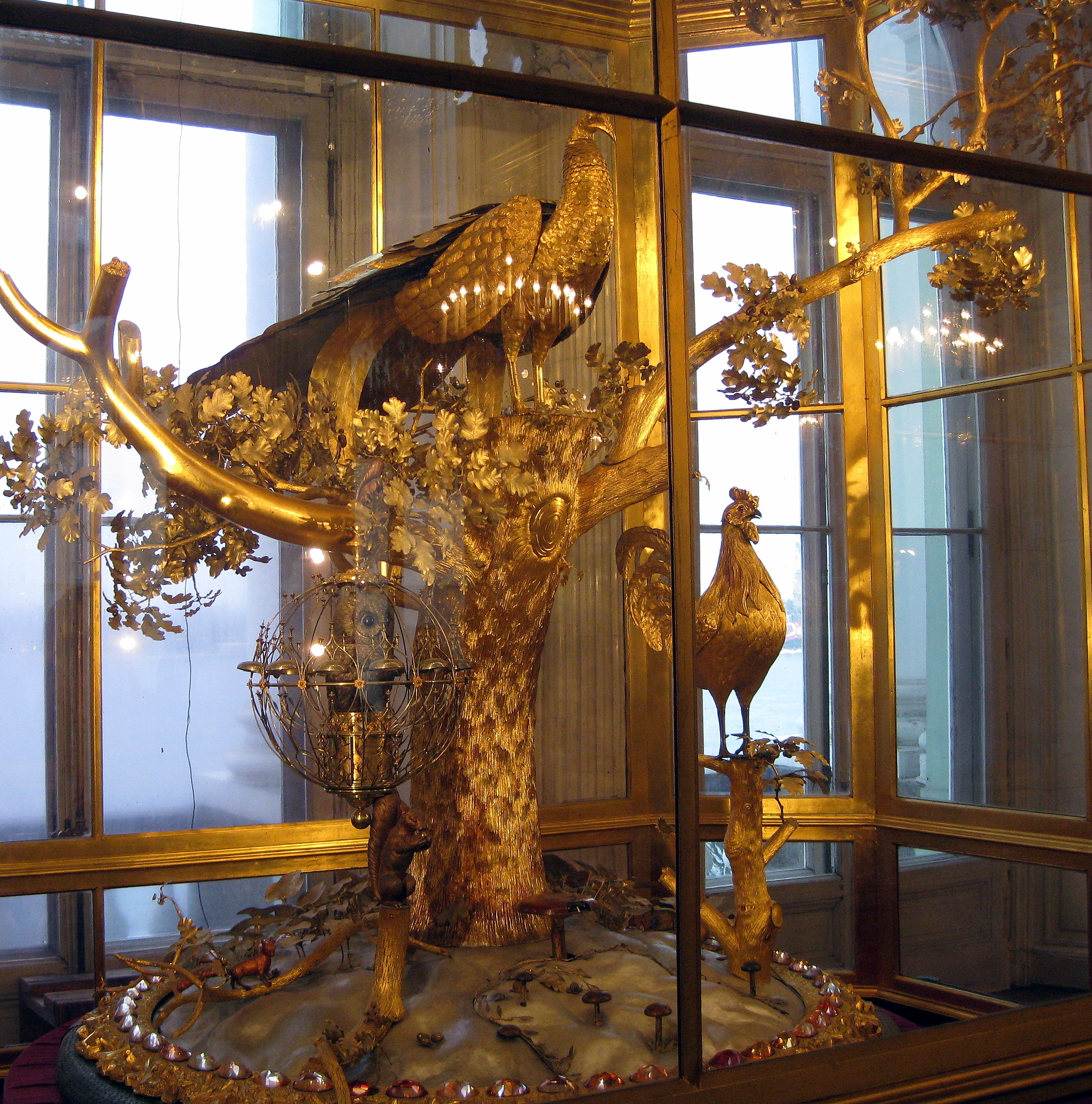
The Peacock Clock

The Peacock egg was inspired by the 18th-century Peacock Clock made by James Cox. The clock was a present from Grigory Potemkin to Catherine the Great. The Peacock Clock was housed in the Winter Palace in Saint Petersburg, Russia, which is now the Hermitage Museum.

In 1927, the Peacock egg was sold with nine other Imperial eggs by the Antikvariat to Emanuel Snowman of Wartski in London. Bought by a Mr. Hirst in 1935, it was sold to Dr. Maurice Sandoz of Switzerland in 1949 and donated in 1955 to his Fondation Edouard et Maurice Sandoz (FEMS) in Lausanne, Switzerland. Since its purchase by Sandoz, it has only been seen publicly six times, the last time in 2009.

== See also ==
- Egg decorating

== Sources ==
- Faber, Toby (2008). Faberge's Eggs: The Extraordinary Story of the Masterpieces That Outlived an Empire. Random House. ISBN 978-1-4000-6550-9.
- Forbes, Christopher; Prinz von Hohenzollern, Johann Georg (1990). FABERGE; The Imperial Eggs. Prestel. ASIN B000YA9GOM.
- Lowes, Will (2001). Fabergé Eggs: A Retrospective Encyclopedia. Scarecrow Press. ISBN 0-8108-3946-6.
- Snowman, A Kenneth (1988). Carl Faberge: Goldsmith to the Imperial Court of Russia. Gramercy. ISBN 0-517-40502-4.
