= Perpetual motion =

Work being continuously done without an external input of energy

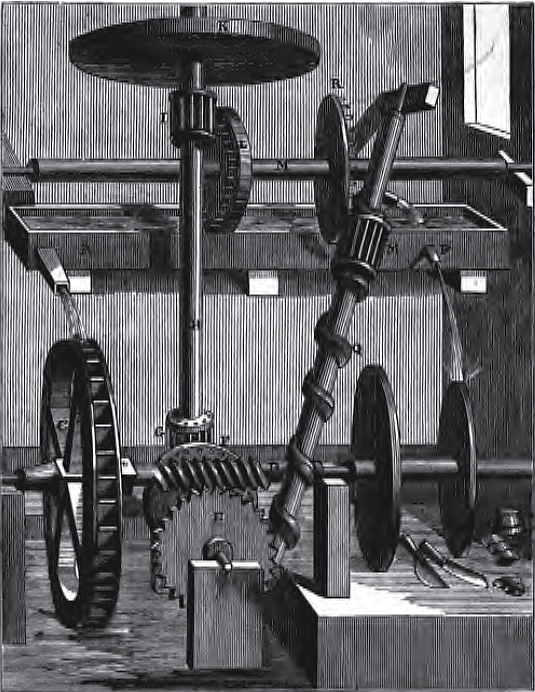
Robert Fludd's 1618 "water screw" perpetual motion machine from a 1660 wood engraving. It is widely credited as the first attempt to describe such a device. (Note: Although the machine would not work, the idea was that water from the top tank turns a water wheel (bottom-left), which drives a complicated series of gears and shafts that ultimately rotate the Archimedes' screw (bottom-center to top-right) to pump water to refill the tank. The rotary motion of the water wheel also drives two grinding wheels (bottom-right) and is shown as providing sufficient excess water to lubricate them.)

Something for Nothing (1940), a short film featuring Rube Goldberg illustrating the U.S. Patent Office's policy regarding perpetual motion machines (and the power efficiency of gasoline)

Perpetual motion is the motion of bodies that continues forever in an unperturbed system. A perpetual motion machine is a hypothetical machine that can do work indefinitely without an external energy source. This kind of machine is impossible, since its existence would violate the first and/or second laws of thermodynamics. These laws of thermodynamics apply regardless of the size of the system. Thus, machines that extract energy from finite sources cannot operate indefinitely because they are driven by the energy stored in the source, which will eventually be exhausted. A common example is devices powered by ocean currents, whose energy is ultimately derived from the Sun, which itself will eventually burn out.

== History ==
The history of perpetual motion machines dates back to the Middle Ages. For millennia, it was not clear whether perpetual motion devices were possible or not, until the development of modern theories of thermodynamics showed that they were impossible. Despite this, many attempts have been made to create such machines, continuing into modern times. Modern designers and proponents often use other terms, such as "over unity", to describe their inventions.

== Basic principles ==
Oh ye seekers after perpetual motion, how many vain chimeras have you pursued? Go and take your place with the alchemists.

— Leonardo da Vinci, 1494

There is a scientific consensus that perpetual motion in an isolated system violates either the first law of thermodynamics, the second law of thermodynamics, or both. The first law of thermodynamics is a version of the law of conservation of energy. The second law can be phrased in several different ways, the most intuitive of which is that heat flows spontaneously from hotter to colder places; relevant here is that the law observes that in every macroscopic process, there is friction or something close to it; another statement is that no heat engine (an engine which produces work while moving heat from a high temperature to a low temperature) can be more efficient than a Carnot heat engine operating between the same two temperatures.

In other words:

1. In any isolated system, one cannot create new energy (law of conservation of energy). As a result, the thermal efficiency—the produced work power divided by the input heating power—cannot be greater than one.
2. The output work power of heat engines is always smaller than the input heating power. The rest of the heat energy supplied is wasted as heat to the ambient surroundings. The thermal efficiency therefore has a maximum, given by the Carnot efficiency, which is always less than one.
3. The efficiency of real heat engines is even lower than the Carnot efficiency due to irreversibility arising from the speed of processes, including friction.

Statements 2 and 3 apply to heat engines. Other types of engines that convert e.g. mechanical into electromagnetic energy, cannot operate with 100% efficiency, because it is impossible to design any system that is free of energy dissipation.

Machines that comply with both laws of thermodynamics by accessing energy from unconventional sources are sometimes referred to as perpetual motion machines, although they do not meet the standard criteria for the name. By way of example, clocks and other low-power machines, such as Cox's timepiece, have been designed to run on the differences in barometric pressure or temperature between night and day. These machines have a source of energy, albeit one which is not readily apparent, so that they only seem to violate the laws of thermodynamics.

Even machines that extract energy from long-lived sources - such as ocean currents - will run down when their energy sources inevitably do. They are not perpetual motion machines because they are consuming energy from an external source and are not isolated systems.

=== Classification ===
One classification of perpetual motion machines refers to the particular law of thermodynamics the machines purport to violate:

- A perpetual motion machine of the first kind produces work without the input of energy. It thus violates the law of conservation of energy.
- A perpetual motion machine of the second kind is a machine that spontaneously converts thermal energy into mechanical work. When the thermal energy is equivalent to the work done, this does not violate the law of conservation of energy. However, it does violate the more subtle second law of thermodynamics in a cyclic process (see also entropy). The signature of a perpetual motion machine of the second kind is that there is only one heat reservoir involved, which is being spontaneously cooled without involving a transfer of heat to a cooler reservoir. This conversion of heat into useful work, without any side effect, is impossible, according to the second law of thermodynamics.
- A perpetual motion machine of the third kind is defined as one that completely eliminates friction and other dissipative forces, to maintain motion forever due to its mass inertia (third in this case refers solely to the position in the above classification scheme, not the third law of thermodynamics). It is impossible to make such a machine, as dissipation can never be completely eliminated in a mechanical system, no matter how close a system gets to this ideal (see examples at § Low friction below).

=== Impossibility ===
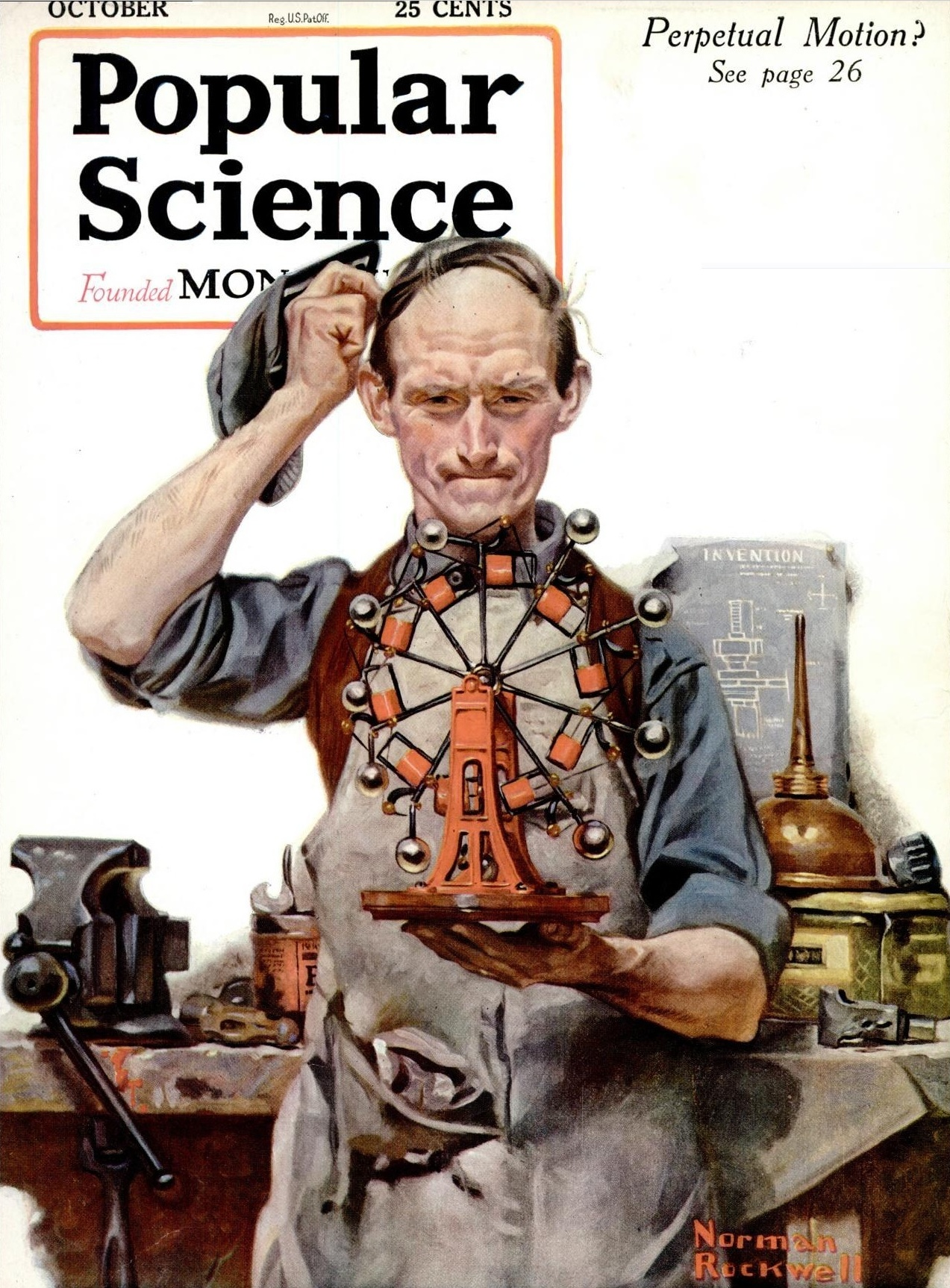
October 1920 issue of Popular Science magazine, on perpetual motion. Although scientists have established that perpetual motion is incompatible with the laws of physics, the idea continues to capture the imagination of inventors. (Note: The device shown is a "mass leverage" device, where the spherical weights on the right have more leverage than those on the left, supposedly creating a perpetual rotation. However, there are a greater number of weights on the left, balancing the device.)

"Epistemic impossibility" describes things which absolutely cannot occur within our current formulation of the physical laws. This interpretation of the word "impossible" is what is intended in discussions of the impossibility of perpetual motion in a closed system.

The conservation laws are particularly robust from a mathematical perspective. Noether's theorem, which was proven mathematically in 1915, states that any conservation law can be derived from a corresponding continuous symmetry of the action of a physical system. The symmetry which is equivalent to conservation of energy is the time invariance of physical laws. Therefore, if the laws of physics do not change with time, then the conservation of energy follows. For energy conservation to be violated to allow perpetual motion would require that the foundations of physics would change.

Scientific investigations as to whether the laws of physics are invariant over time use telescopes to examine the universe in the distant past to discover, to the limits of our measurements, whether ancient stars were identical to stars today. Combining different measurements such as spectroscopy, direct measurement of the speed of light in the past and similar measurements demonstrates that physics has remained substantially the same, if not identical, for all of observable time spanning billions of years.

The principles of thermodynamics are so well established, both theoretically and experimentally, that proposals for perpetual motion machines are universally dismissed by physicists. Any proposed perpetual motion design offers a potentially instructive challenge to physicists: one is certain that it cannot work, so one must explain how it fails to work. The difficulty (and the value) of such an exercise depends on the subtlety of the proposal; the best ones tend to arise from physicists' own thought experiments and often shed light upon certain aspects of physics. So, for example, the thought experiment of a Brownian ratchet as a perpetual motion machine was first discussed by Gabriel Lippmann in 1900 but it was not until 1912 that Marian Smoluchowski gave an adequate explanation for why it cannot work. However, during that twelve-year period scientists did not believe that the machine was possible. They were merely unaware of the exact mechanism by which it would inevitably fail.

The law that entropy always increases – the second law of thermodynamics – holds, I think, the supreme position among the laws of Nature. If someone points out to you that your pet theory of the universe is in disagreement with Maxwell's equations – then so much the worse for Maxwell's equations. If it is found to be contradicted by observation – well, these experimentalists do bungle things sometimes. But if your theory is found to be against the second law of thermodynamics I can give you no hope; there is nothing for it but to collapse in deepest humiliation.

— Sir Arthur Stanley Eddington, The Nature of the Physical World (1927)

In the mid-19th-century Henry Dircks investigated the history of perpetual motion experiments, writing a vitriolic attack on those who continued to attempt what he believed to be impossible:

There is something lamentable, degrading, and almost insane in pursuing the visionary schemes of past ages with dogged determination, in paths of learning which have been investigated by superior minds, and with which such adventurous persons are totally unacquainted. The history of Perpetual Motion is a history of the fool-hardiness of either half-learned, or totally ignorant persons.

— Henry Dircks, Perpetuum Mobile: Or, A History of the Search for Self-motive (1861)

=== Techniques ===
One day man will connect his apparatus to the very wheelwork of the universe [...] and the very forces that motivate the planets in their orbits and cause them to rotate will rotate his own machinery.

— Nikola Tesla

Some common ideas recur repeatedly in perpetual motion machine designs. Many ideas that continue to appear today were stated as early as 1670 by John Wilkins, Bishop of Chester and an official of the Royal Society. He outlined three potential sources of power for a perpetual motion machine, "Chymical [sic] Extractions", "Magnetical Virtues" and "the Natural Affection of Gravity".

The seemingly mysterious ability of magnets to influence motion at a distance without any apparent energy source has long appealed to inventors. One of the earliest examples of a magnetic motor was proposed by Wilkins and has been widely copied since: it consists of a ramp with a magnet at the top, which pulled a metal ball up the ramp. Near the magnet was a small hole that was supposed to allow the ball to drop under the ramp and return to the bottom, where a flap allowed it to return to the top again. However, if the magnet is to be strong enough to pull the ball up the ramp, it cannot then be weak enough to allow gravity to pull it through the hole. Faced with this problem, more modern versions typically use a series of ramps and magnets, positioned so the ball is to be handed off from one magnet to another as it moves. The problem remains the same.

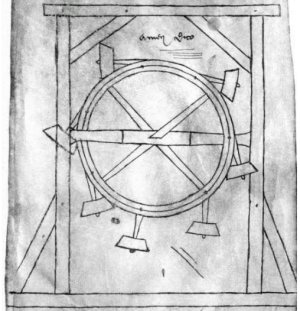
Perpetuum mobile of Villard de Honnecourt (about 1230).

The "Overbalanced Wheel", annotated with distances of the weights from the centreline showing that the torques on both sides even out on average

Gravity also acts at a distance, without an apparent energy source, but to get energy out of a gravitational field (for instance, by dropping a heavy object, producing kinetic energy as it falls) one has to put energy in (for instance, by lifting the object up), and some energy is always dissipated in the process. A typical application of gravity in a perpetual motion machine is Bhaskara's wheel in the 12th century, whose key idea is itself a recurring theme, often called the overbalanced wheel: moving weights are attached to a wheel in such a way that they fall to a position further from the wheel's center for one half of the wheel's rotation, and closer to the center for the other half. Since weights further from the center apply a greater torque, it was thought that the wheel would rotate forever. However, since the side with weights further from the center has fewer weights than the other side, at that moment, the torque is balanced and perpetual movement is not achieved. The moving weights may be hammers on pivoted arms, or rolling balls, or mercury in tubes; the principle is the same.

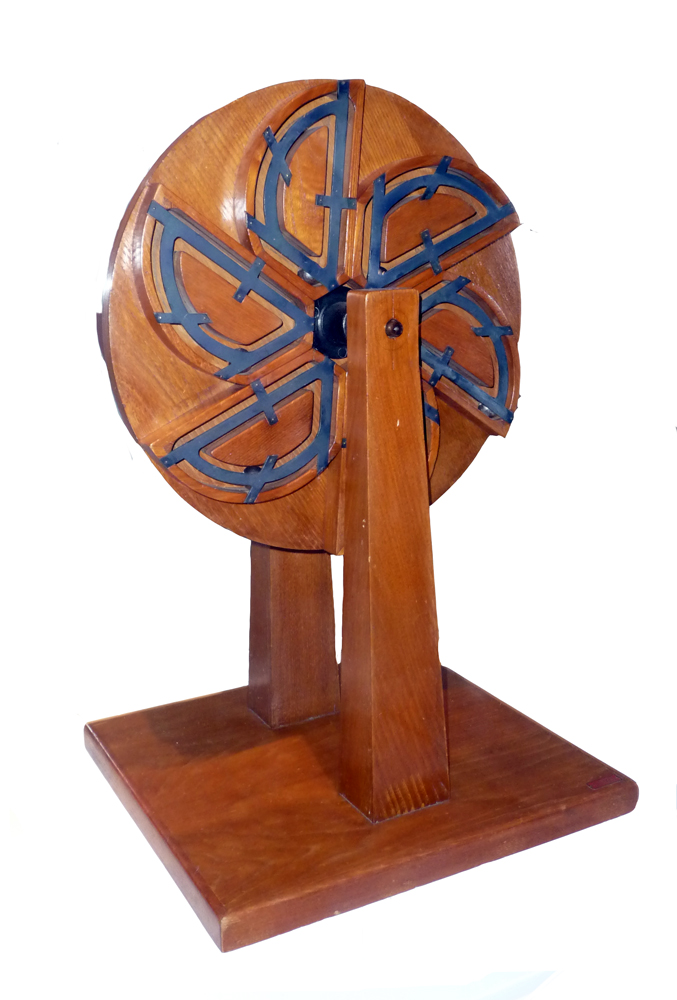
Perpetual motion wheels from a drawing by Leonardo da Vinci

Another theoretical machine involves a frictionless environment for motion. This involves the use of diamagnetic or electromagnetic levitation to float an object. This is done in a vacuum to eliminate air friction and friction from an axle. The levitated object is then free to rotate around its center of gravity without interference. However, this machine has no practical purpose because the rotated object cannot do any work as work requires the levitated object to cause motion in other objects, bringing friction into the problem. Furthermore, a perfect vacuum is an unattainable goal since both the container and the object itself would slowly vaporize, thereby degrading the vacuum.

To extract work from heat, thus producing a perpetual motion machine of the second kind, the most common approach (dating back at least to Maxwell's demon) is unidirectionality. Only molecules moving fast enough and in the right direction are allowed through the demon's trap door. In a Brownian ratchet, forces tending to turn the ratchet one way are able to do so while forces in the other direction are not. A diode in a heat bath allows through currents in one direction and not the other. These schemes typically fail in two ways: either maintaining the unidirectionality costs energy (requiring Maxwell's demon to perform more thermodynamic work to gauge the speed of the molecules than the amount of energy gained by the difference of temperature caused) or the unidirectionality is an illusion and occasional big violations make up for the frequent small non-violations (the Brownian ratchet will be subject to internal Brownian forces and therefore will sometimes turn the wrong way).

The "Float Belt". The yellow blocks indicate floaters. It was thought that the floaters would rise through the liquid and turn the belt. However, pushing the floaters into the water at the bottom takes as much energy as the floating generates, and some energy is dissipated.

Buoyancy is another frequently misunderstood phenomenon. Some proposed perpetual-motion machines miss the fact that to push a volume of air down in a fluid takes the same work as to raise a corresponding volume of fluid up against gravity. These types of machines may involve two chambers with pistons, and a mechanism to squeeze the air out of the top chamber into the bottom one, which then becomes buoyant and floats to the top. The squeezing mechanism in these designs would not be able to do enough work to move the air down, or would leave no excess work available to be extracted.

== Patents ==
Proposals for such inoperable machines have become so common that the United States Patent and Trademark Office (USPTO) has made an official policy of refusing to grant patents for perpetual motion machines without a working model. The USPTO Manual of Patent Examining Practice states:

With the exception of cases involving perpetual motion, a model is not ordinarily required by the Office to demonstrate the operability of a device. If operability of a device is questioned, the applicant must establish it to the satisfaction of the examiner, but he or she may choose his or her own way of so doing.

And, further, that:

A rejection [of a patent application] on the ground of lack of utility includes the more specific grounds of inoperativeness, involving perpetual motion. A rejection under 35 U.S.C. 101 for lack of utility should not be based on grounds that the invention is frivolous, fraudulent or against public policy.

The filing of a patent application is a clerical task, and the USPTO will not refuse filings for perpetual motion machines; the application will be filed and then most probably rejected by the patent examiner, after he has done a formal examination. Even if a patent is granted, it does not mean that the invention actually works, it just means that the examiner believes that it works, or was unable to figure out why it would not work.

The United Kingdom Patent Office has a specific practice on perpetual motion; Section 4.05 of the UKPO Manual of Patent Practice states:

Processes or articles alleged to operate in a manner which is clearly contrary to well-established physical laws, such as perpetual motion machines, are regarded as not having industrial application.

Examples of decisions by the UK Patent Office to refuse patent applications for perpetual motion machines include:

- Decision BL O/044/06, John Frederick Willmott's application no. 0502841
- Decision BL O/150/06, Ezra Shimshi's application no. 0417271

The European Patent Classification (ECLA) has classes including patent applications on perpetual motion systems: ECLA classes "F03B17/04: Alleged perpetua mobilia" and "F03B17/00B: [... machines or engines] (with closed loop circulation or similar : ... Installations wherein the liquid circulates in a closed loop; Alleged perpetua mobilia of this or similar kind".

== Apparent perpetual motion machines ==
As a perpetual motion machine can only be defined in a finite isolated system with discrete parameters, and since true isolated systems do not exist (among other things, due to quantum uncertainty), "perpetual motion" in the context of this article is better defined as a "perpetual motion machine", since a machine is "a mechanically, electrically, or electronically operated device for performing a task", whereas "motion" is simply movement (such as Brownian motion). Distinctions aside, on the macro scale, there are concepts and technical drafts that propose "perpetual motion", but on closer analysis it is revealed that they actually "consume" some sort of natural resource or latent energy, such as the phase changes of water or other fluids or small natural temperature gradients, or simply cannot sustain indefinite operation. In general, extracting work from these devices is impossible.

=== Resource consuming ===
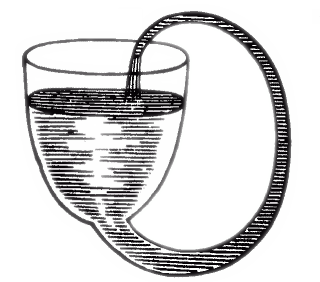
The "capillary bowl"

Some examples of such devices include:

- The drinking bird toy functions using small ambient temperature gradients and evaporation. It runs until all water is evaporated.
- A capillary action-based water pump functions using small ambient temperature gradients and vapour pressure differences. With the "capillary bowl", it was thought that the capillary action would keep the water flowing in the tube, but since the cohesion force that draws the liquid up the tube in the first place holds the droplet from releasing into the bowl, the flow is not perpetual.
- A Crookes radiometer consists of a partial vacuum glass container with a lightweight propeller moved by (light-induced) temperature gradients.
- Any device picking up minimal amounts of energy from the natural electromagnetic radiation around it, such as a solar-powered motor.
- Any device powered by changes in air pressure, such as some clocks (Cox's timepiece, Beverly Clock). The motion leeches energy from moving air which in turn gained its energy from being acted on.
- A heat pump, due to it having a COP above 1: the energy it consumes as work is less than the energy it moves as heat.
- The Atmos clock uses changes in the vapor pressure of ethyl chloride with temperature to wind the clock spring.
- A device powered by induced nuclear reactions or by radioactive decay from an isotope with a relatively long half-life; such a device could plausibly operate for hundreds or thousands of years.
- The Oxford Electric Bell and the Karpen Pile are driven by dry pile batteries.

=== Low friction ===
- In flywheel energy storage, "modern flywheels can have a zero-load rundown time measurable in years".
- Once spun up, objects in the vacuum of space—stars, black holes, planets, moons, spin-stabilized satellites, etc.—dissipate energy very slowly, allowing them to spin for long periods. Tides on Earth are dissipating the gravitational energy of the Moon/Earth system at an average rate of about 3.75 terawatts.

=== Quantum effects ===
In 2016, new states of matter, time crystals, were discovered in which, on a microscopic scale, the component atoms are in continual repetitive motion, thus satisfying the literal definition of "perpetual motion". However, these do not constitute perpetual motion machines in the traditional sense, or violate thermodynamic laws, because they are in their quantum ground state, so no energy can be extracted from them; they exhibit motion without energy.

=== Thought experiments ===
In some cases a thought experiment appears to suggest that perpetual motion may be possible through accepted and understood physical processes. However, in all cases, a flaw has been found when all of the relevant physics is considered. Examples include:

- Maxwell's demon: This was originally proposed to show that the second law of thermodynamics applied in the statistical sense only, by postulating a "demon" that could select energetic molecules and extract their energy. Subsequent analysis (and experiment) have shown there is no way to physically implement such a system that does not result in an overall increase in entropy.
- Brownian ratchet: In this thought experiment, one imagines a paddle wheel connected to a ratchet. Brownian motion would cause surrounding gas molecules to strike the paddles, but the ratchet would only allow it to turn in one direction. A more thorough analysis showed that when a physical ratchet was considered at this molecular scale, Brownian motion would also affect the ratchet and cause it to randomly fail resulting in no net gain. Thus, the device would not violate the laws of thermodynamics.
- Vacuum energy and zero-point energy: In order to explain effects such as virtual particles and the Casimir effect, many formulations of quantum physics include a background energy which pervades empty space, known as vacuum or zero-point energy. The ability to harness zero-point energy for useful work is considered pseudoscience by the scientific community at large. Inventors have proposed various methods for extracting useful work from zero-point energy, but none have been found to be viable, no claims for extraction of zero-point energy have ever been validated by the scientific community, and there is no evidence that zero-point energy can be used in violation of conservation of energy.
- Ellipsoid paradox: This paradox considers a perfectly reflecting cavity with two black bodies at points A and B. The reflecting surface is composed of two elliptical sections E_{1} and E_{2} and a spherical section S, and the bodies at A and B are located at the joint foci of the two ellipses and B is at the center of S. This configuration is such that the black body at B heats up relative to A: the radiation originating from the black body at A will land on and be absorbed by the blackbody at B. Similarly, rays originating from point B that land on E_{1} and E_{2} will be reflected to A. However, a significant proportion of rays that start from B will land on S will be reflected back to B. This paradox is solved when the black bodies' finite sizes are considered instead of pointlike black bodies.

Ellipsoid paradox surface and rays emitted by body A in the direction of body B. (a) When bodies A and B are point like, all rays from A must be incident on B. (b) When bodies A and B are extended, some rays from A will not be incident on B and may eventually return to A.

== Conspiracy theories ==
Despite being dismissed as pseudoscientific, perpetual motion machines have become the focus of conspiracy theories, alleging that they are being hidden from the public by corporations or governments, who would lose economic control if a power source capable of producing energy cheaply was made available.

== See also ==
- Anti-gravity
- Faster-than-light
- Incredible utility
- Johann Bessler
- Pathological science
- Time travel
