= Nicolae Vasilescu-Karpen =

Romanian engineer and physicist

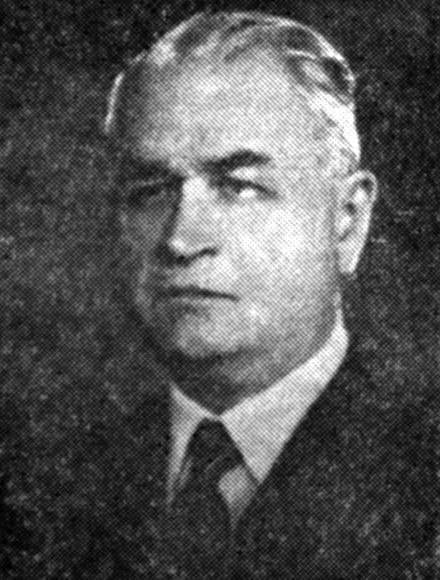
Nicolae Vasilescu-Karpen

Nicolae Vasilescu Karpen (December 10 (O.S.)/December 22 (N.S.), 1870, in Craiova – March 2, 1964, in Bucharest) was a Romanian engineer and physicist, who worked in telegraphy and telephony and had achievements in mechanical engineering, elasticity, thermodynamics, long-distance telephony, electrochemistry, and civil engineering.

== Life ==
After studying at the Carol I High School in Craiova, he went to the School of Bridges, Roads and Mines in Bucharest. After graduating in 1891, he worked as a civil engineer for three years. He went to France to study physics at the University of Paris. In 1904 he was awarded a PhD in physics for his thesis Recherches sur l'effet magnétique des corps electrisés en mouvement (Research on the magnetic effect of electrified bodies in motion). After a year as a professor at the University of Lille, he returned to Romania to teach at the School of Bridges, Roads and Mines, where he was appointed director in February 1920. As a result of his efforts, the School was transformed later that year into the Polytechnic University of Bucharest. Vasilescu Karpen was the first rector of this university, serving in that capacity until 1940.

In 1908(?) he is said to have invented the Karpen Pile. He was the engineer who introduced a permanent wire telecom bridge between Brașov and Bucharest. He introduced electrically transmitted "wired telegrams" in the Romanian Old Kingdom by 1920. He became a titular member of the Romanian Academy in 1923; stripped of membership by the new communist regime in 1948, he was restored to the academy in 1955.

== Karpen Pile ==
The Karpen Pile is claimed to be a battery that has provided continuous energy for over 60 years, making it either a supremely effective method of storing energy or a hoax, furthermore some newspapers describe it as a perpetuum mobile, but most scientists disagree since such a device would violate the Second law of thermodynamics. The device is housed at the Dimitrie Leonida National Technical Museum by 2010. There were claims that it had been working there continuously for 60 years. The prototype has been assembled in 1950 and consists of two series-connected electric piles moving a small galvanometric motor. The motor moves a blade that is connected to a switch. With every half rotation, the blade opens the circuit and closes it at the start of the second half. The blade's rotation time had been calculated so that the piles have time to recharge and that they can rebuild their polarity during the time that the circuit is open. It uses platinum and gold electrodes and no detectable corrosion effect happens. Normally, one electrode should corrode and lose ions which should deposit around the other electrode. Apparently, this does not happen. The cell is just as basic as it gets: two pure electrodes immersed in pure sulfuric acid. Everything sealed. However, the fact that the electrodes are made of gold and platinum (the least reactive metals) and the very low density of the generated power could be the reason why the pile is still working.

== See also ==
- Oxford Electric Bell
- Beverly Clock
- Pitch drop experiment
