= Kulibin =

Kublibin may refer to:

- Ivan Kulibin (1735–1818), Russian mechanic and inventor
- 5809 Kulibin, an asteroid
