= Ivan Kulibin =

Russian mechanic

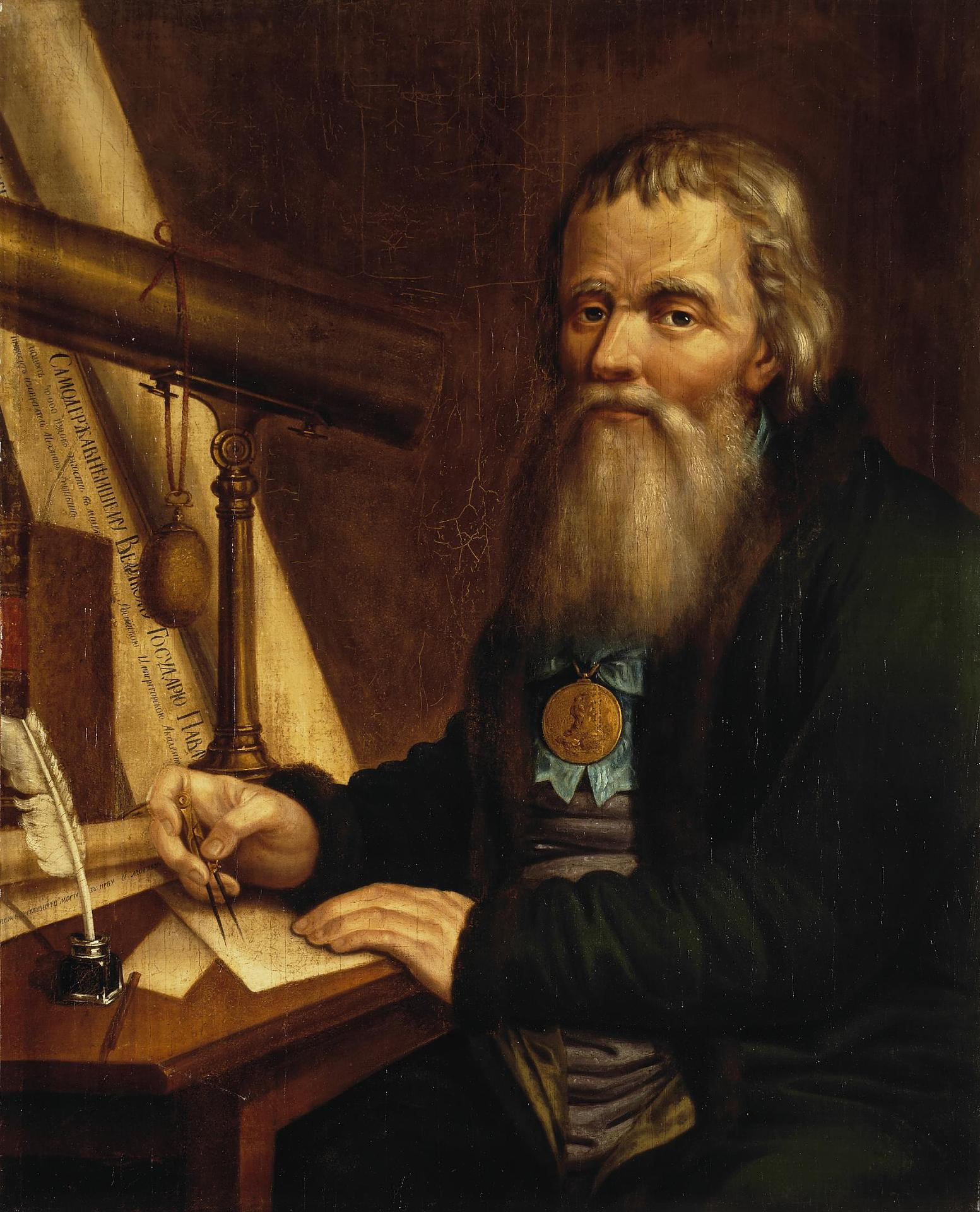
Ivan Kulibin

Ivan Petrovich Kulibin (April 21, 1735 – August 11, 1818) was a Russian mechanic and inventor. He was born in Nizhny Novgorod in the family of a trader. From childhood, Kulibin displayed an interest in constructing mechanical tools. Soon, clock mechanisms became a special interest of his. His realizations as well as his prolific imagination inspired the work of many.

== Saint Petersburg years ==
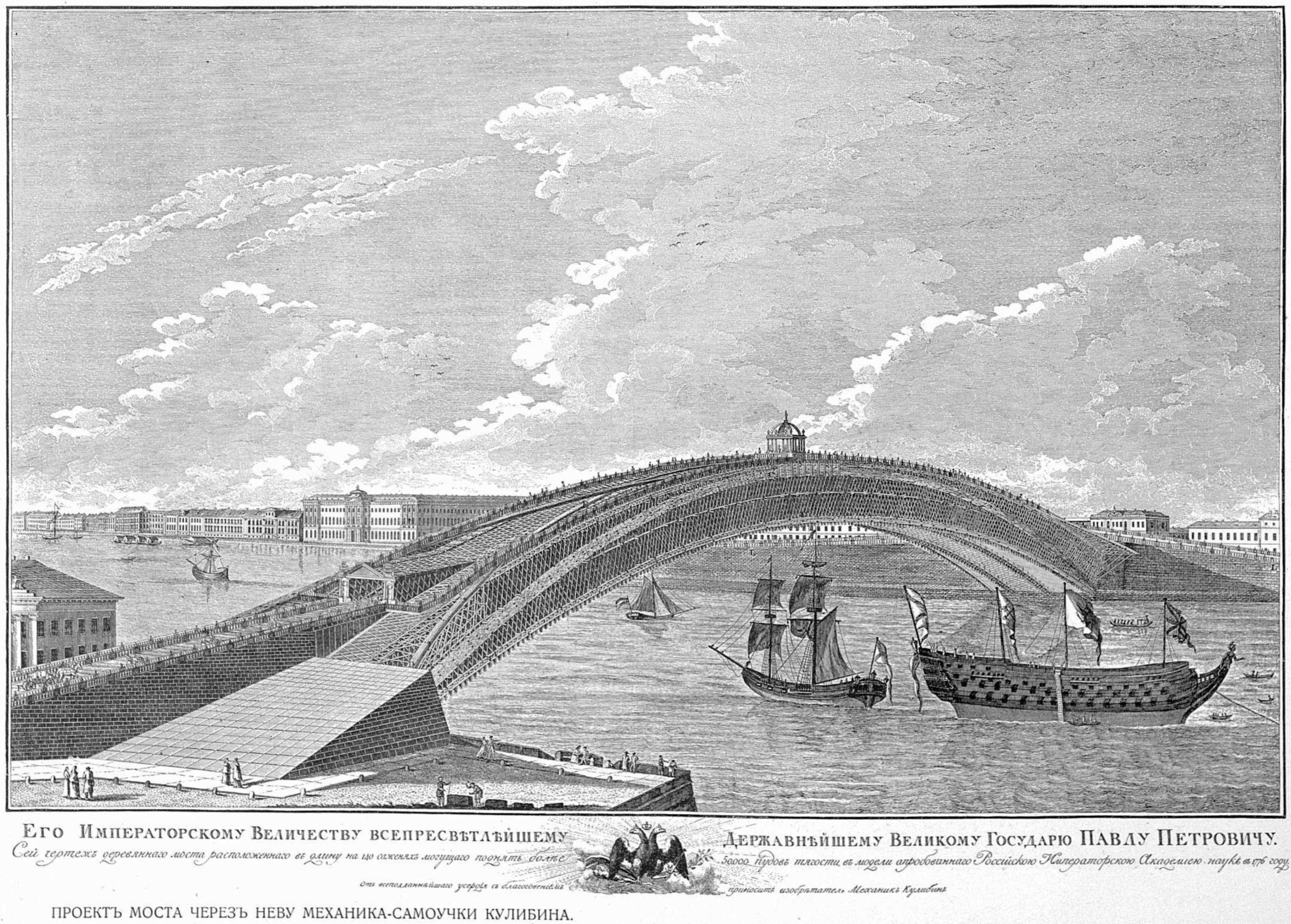
The famous project of Kulibin's one-arch bridge over the Neva.

During 1764-1767 he built an egg-shaped clock, containing a complex automatic mechanism. In 1769 Kulibin gave this clock to Catherine II, who assigned Kulibin to be in charge of the mechanical workshop in the Academy of Sciences of Saint Petersburg (established in 1724). There, Kulibin built a “planetary” pocket-clock, which showed not only the current time, but also the month, day of the week, the season and the current moon phase. Kulibin also designed projects for tower clocks, miniature "clock-in-a-ring" types and others. He also worked on new ways to facet glass for use in microscopes, telescopes and other optical instruments.

During the 1770s, he designed a wooden one-arch bridge over the Neva river with a span of 298 metres (instead of the typically used 50–60 metre spans), offering to use an original girder with a cross grate. In 1776 a model 1/10 the natural size of this bridge was tested by a special commission of academics. Kulibin's project was praised by Leonhard Euler and Daniel Bernoulli, but was never realized. After 1780 Kulibin worked on possibilities for a metallic bridge, but these projects were also rejected by the government. Altogether Kulibin designed three projects for wooden and three projects for metallic bridges.

In 1779 he built a lantern that could emit a powerful light using a weak light source. This invention was used industrially for lighting workshops, lighthouses, ships, etc. In 1791 Kulibin constructed a push-cycle cart, in which he used a flywheel, a brake, a gearbox and roller bearing. The cart was operated by a man pressing pedals. In the same year, he also designed "mechanical legs", a prosthetic device, which was later used by a French entrepreneur. In 1793 Kulibin constructed an elevator that lifted a cabin using screw mechanisms. In 1794 he created an optical telegraph for transmitting signals over distance. He assembled the famous Peacock Clock created by James Cox and purchased by Catherine the Great, the only large 18th century automaton that has come down to us in its authentic configuration without any change or modification.

== Later years ==
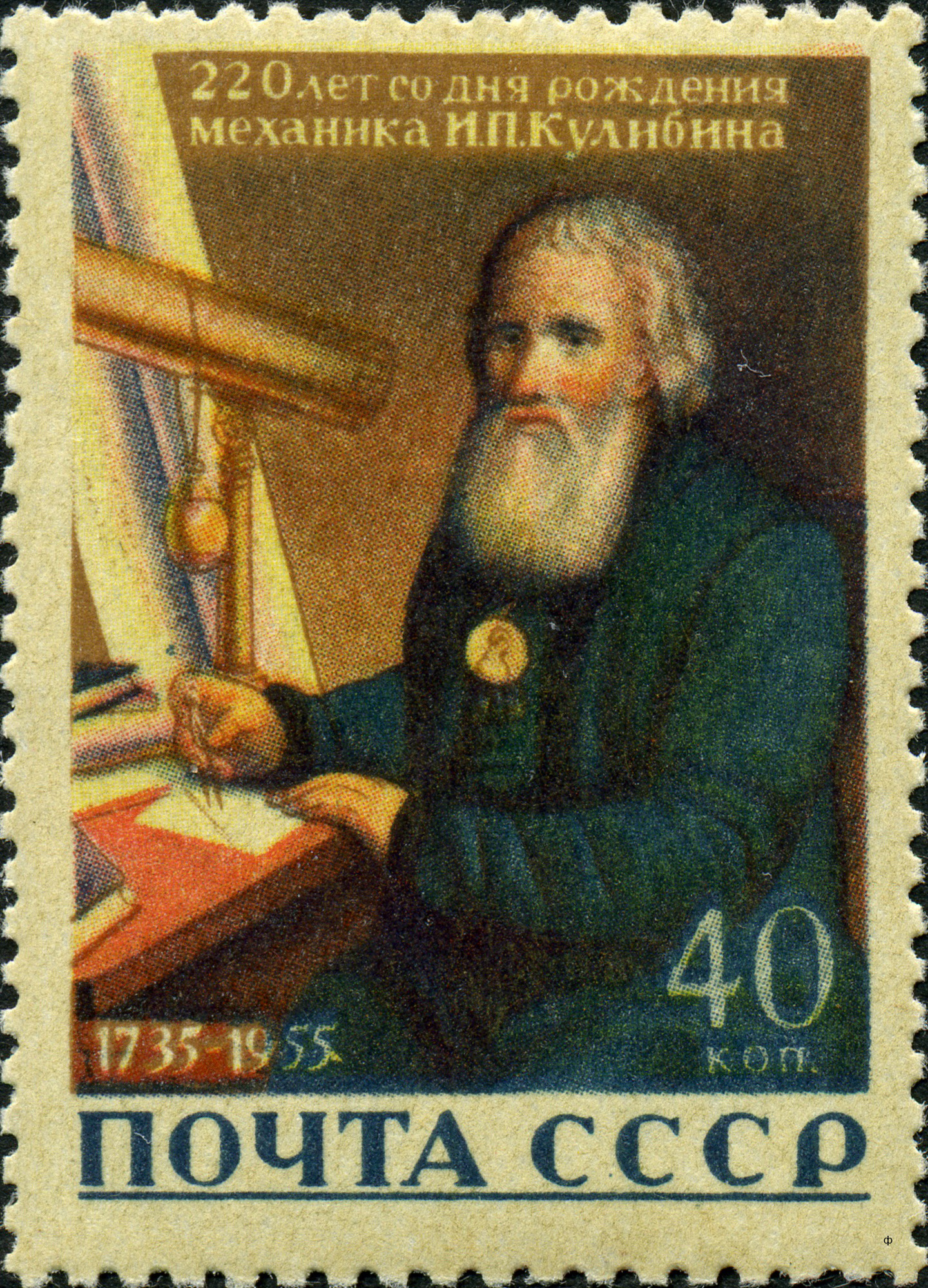
Ivan Kulibin on a 1955 Soviet postage stamp.

In 1801 Kulibin was fired from the academy and returned to Nizhny Novgorod, where he designed a method of sailing upstream and built a ship which he had started to design back in 1782. Tests indicated that such ships were indeed feasible, but they were never used. During the same time, Kulibin had projects on using steam engines to move cargo ships, on creating salt mining machines, different kinds of mills, pianos and other projects. Kulibin died in 1818 after spending his last years in poverty.

The International Astronomical Union's Minor Planet Center has named an asteroid in Kulibin's honor: 5809 Kulibin. The asteroid was discovered on September 4, 1987 by L. V. Zhuravleva at Nauchnyj.

On May 20, 2020, a special economic zone of industrial and production type "Kulibin" was established in Russia (Nizhny Novgorod region), named after Kulibin.
