= Silver Swan (automaton) =

Clockwork-driven, life-sized musical silver swan

Coordinates: 54°32′31″N 1°54′55″W

External videos
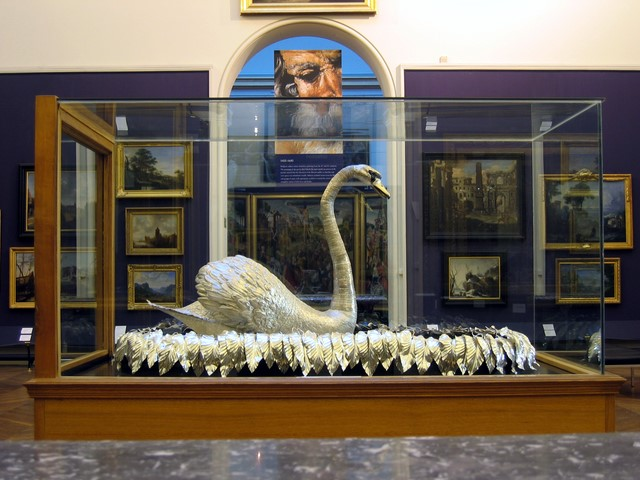
- "Silver swan automaton", at the Bowes Museum
- "Dancing Silver Swan" with narrator
- "Servicing The Bowes Museum's Silver Swan"

The Silver Swan is an automaton dating from the 18th century and now housed in the Bowes Museum, Barnard Castle, Teesdale, County Durham, England. It was acquired by John Bowes, the museum's founder, from a Parisian jeweller in 1872.

The swan, which is life-sized, is a clockwork-driven device that includes a music box. The swan sits in a "stream" made of glass rods and surrounded by silver leaves. Small silver fish can be seen "swimming" in the stream.

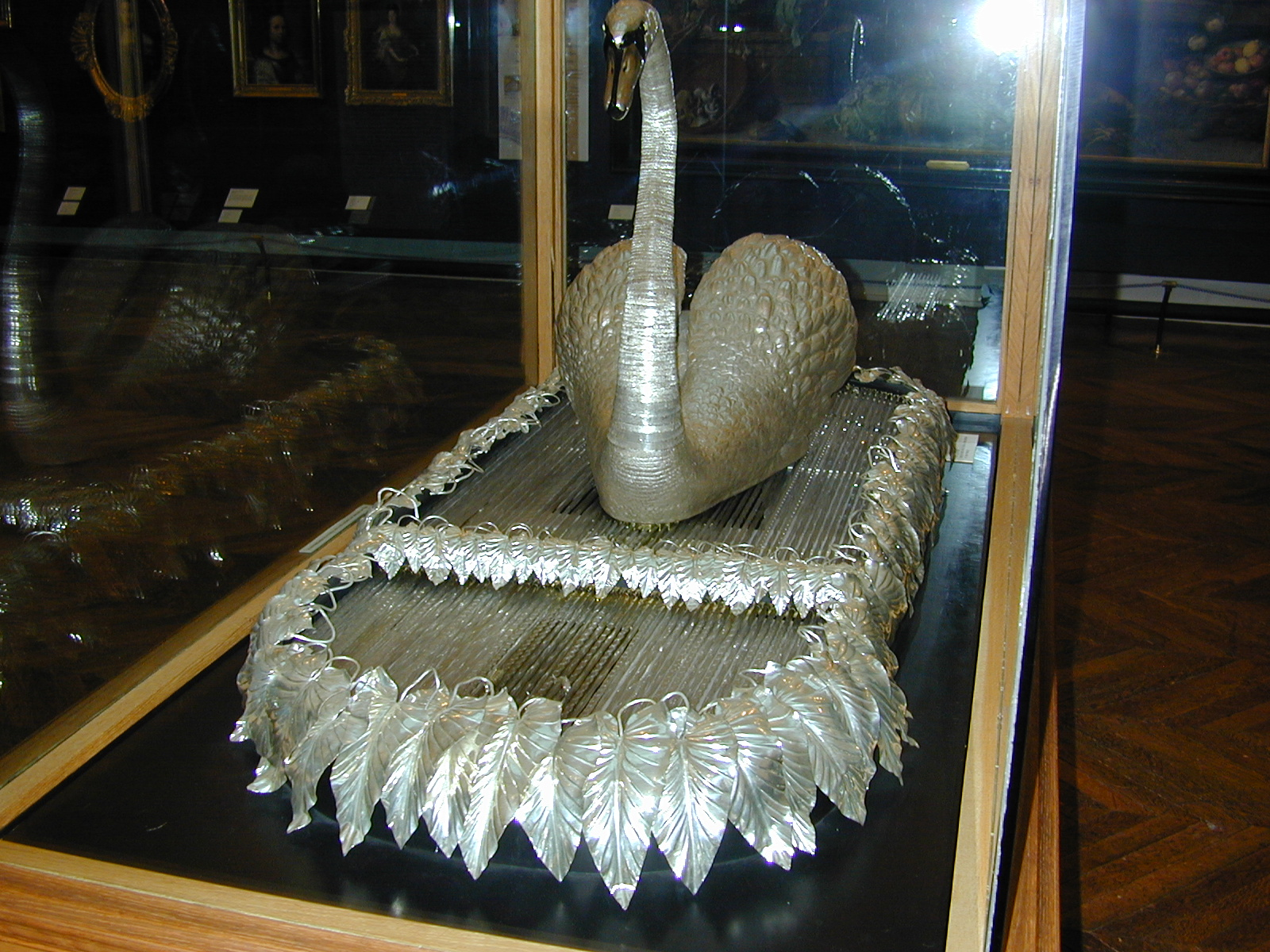
A small silver fish may just be seen in the foreground

When the clockwork is wound, the music box plays and the glass rods rotate giving the illusion of flowing water. The swan turns its head from side to side and also preens itself. After a few moments the swan notices the swimming fish and bends down to catch and eat one. The swan's head then returns to the upright position and the performance, which lasts about 32 seconds, is over.

The mechanism was designed and built by the Low Countries inventor John Joseph Merlin (1735–1803) in conjunction with the London inventor James Cox (1723–1800) in 1773.

The swan was described in the Cox's Museum Act 1772 (13 Geo. 3. c. 41) as being 3 feet (0.91 m) in diameter and 18 feet (5.49 m) high. This would seem to indicate that at one time there was more to the swan than remains today as it is no longer that high. It is said that there was originally a waterfall behind the swan, which was stolen while it was on tour – this could possibly explain the height which is now 'missing'.

It is known that the swan was sold several times and was shown at the Exposition Universelle held in Paris in 1867. The American novelist Mark Twain observed the swan and recorded his observation in a chapter of the Innocents Abroad, writing that the swan "had a living grace about his movement and a living intelligence in his eyes."

In 2017 starting in February the swan spent 6 weeks at the Science Museum as part of an exhibition on robots.

To help preserve the mechanism, the swan is only operated once each day (twice on holidays). The museum was closed during 2020 and 2021 so the daily display did not take place; when the exhibit was being prepared for reopening in May 2021 the clockwork mechanism was found to have seized up and it was withdrawn from display for further conservation. In October 2021, the Bowes Museum hosted a 'Silver Swan Study Week', led by clockmaker-conservator Matthew Read. During the week, visitors were able to watch a group of specialist conservators and curators dismantle the swan as they explored the mechanical condition of the object, ahead of creating a conservation plan for its preservation. The swan was returned to a functional state by March 2024.

The Bowes Museum believes that the Swan is their best-known artefact, and it is the basis of the museum's logo.

== References and further reading ==
- Camerer-Cuss, T. P. (June 1965). "The Silver Swan". Antiquarian Horology. 4: 330–34.
