= Arthur Beverly =

Watchmaker, mathematician, astronomer

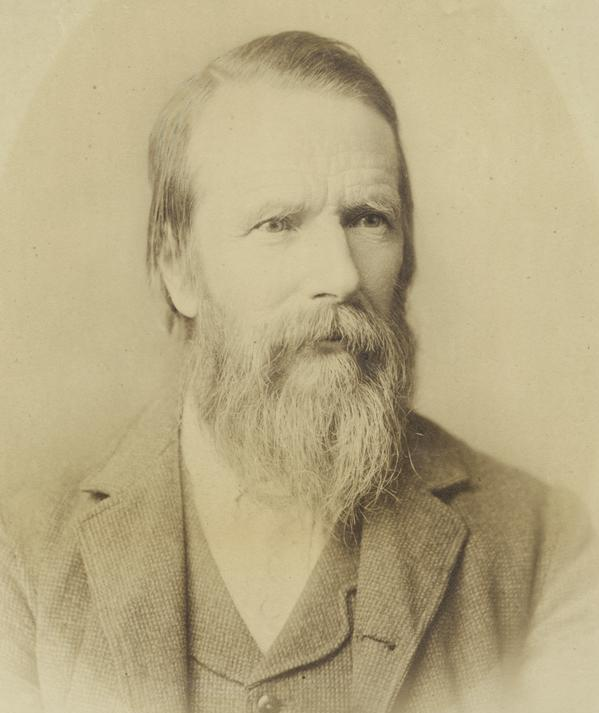
Beverly c. 1875-1891

Arthur Beverly (22 March 1822 – 25 October 1907) was a New Zealand watchmaker, mathematician and astronomer.

He was born the son of farmer George Beverly in Stonehaven, Aberdeenshire, Scotland and was educated at home and by a local shoemaker in the evenings. He was apprenticed at 14 to an Aberdeen watchmaker and optician, where he made a reputation as a lensmaker. After he made a set of microscope lenses for Dr George Dickie, professor of botany at the University of Aberdeen, Dickie recommended him to other scientists.

In 1852 he sailed to Australia and after a spell in the goldfields moved to Melbourne to work as a watchmaker, moving on to New Zealand in 1858, where he set up a business in Dunedin. In the New Zealand Exhibition of 1865 he exhibited a clock, known as the Beverly Clock, which used the daily variation in temperature to wind itself up, and is on permanent display in the Department of Physics at the University of Otago. He also exhibited a planimeter to measure the area of irregular shapes. He was awarded the Makdougall Brisbane medal of the Royal Scottish Society of Arts in 1865 for his planimeter design.

He was also very interested in astronomy and built his own 3 inch telescope. The Beverly-Begg Observatory is named in his honour. Other interests of Beverly's included botany and he was influential in the support of the Otago Museum.

He died unmarried in 1907, leaving his money to the University of Otago. The bequest supports Beverly Bursaries for undergraduate Physics students.

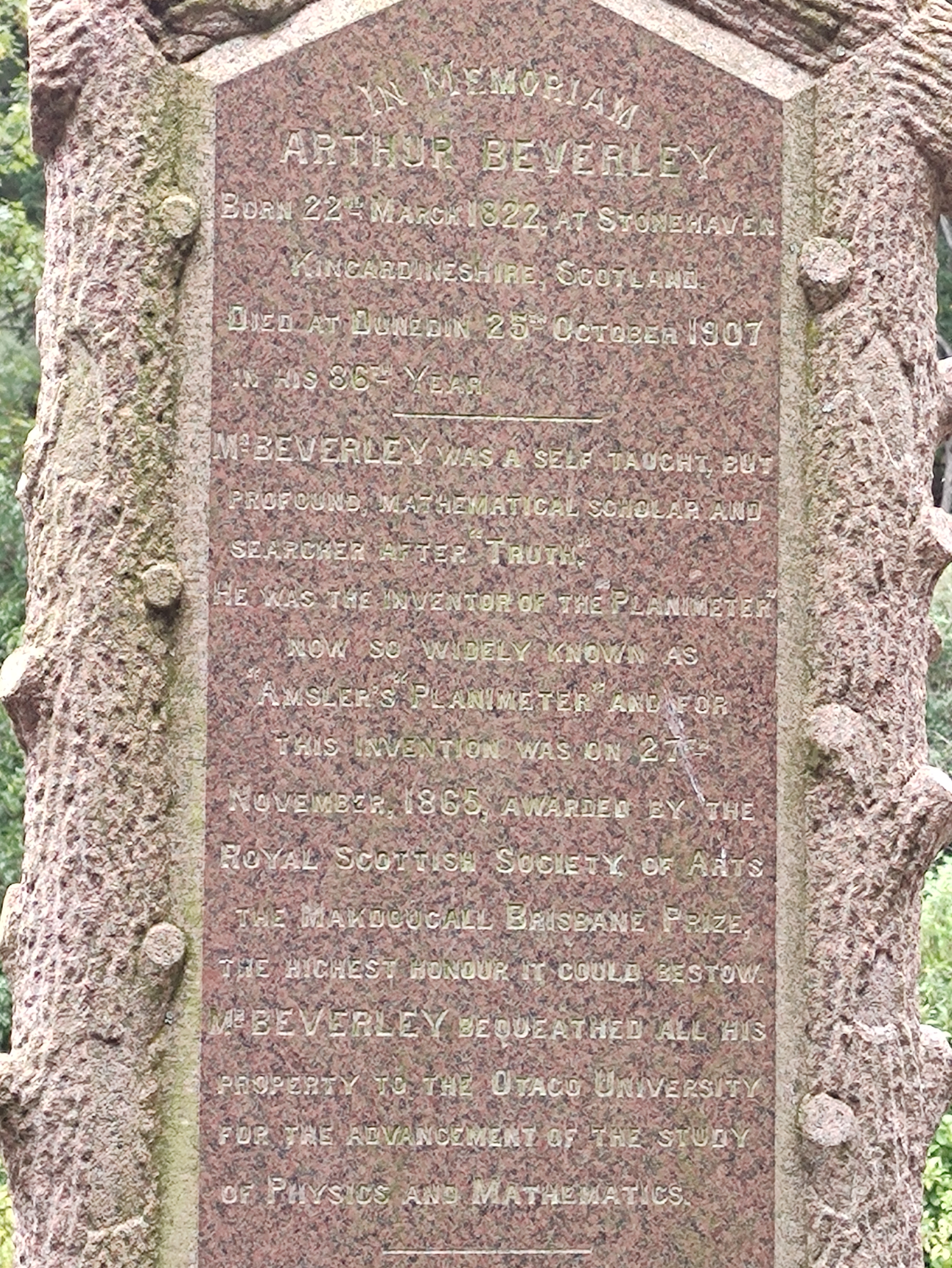
Headstone of Arthur Beverly located in North Cemetery, Dunedin, New Zealand

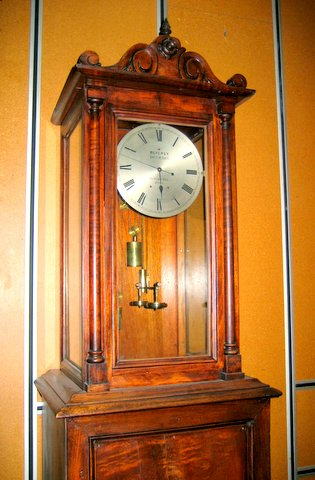
The Beverly clock at Otago University
