= John Joseph Merlin =

Belgian Freemason, clock-maker, musical-instrument maker and inventor

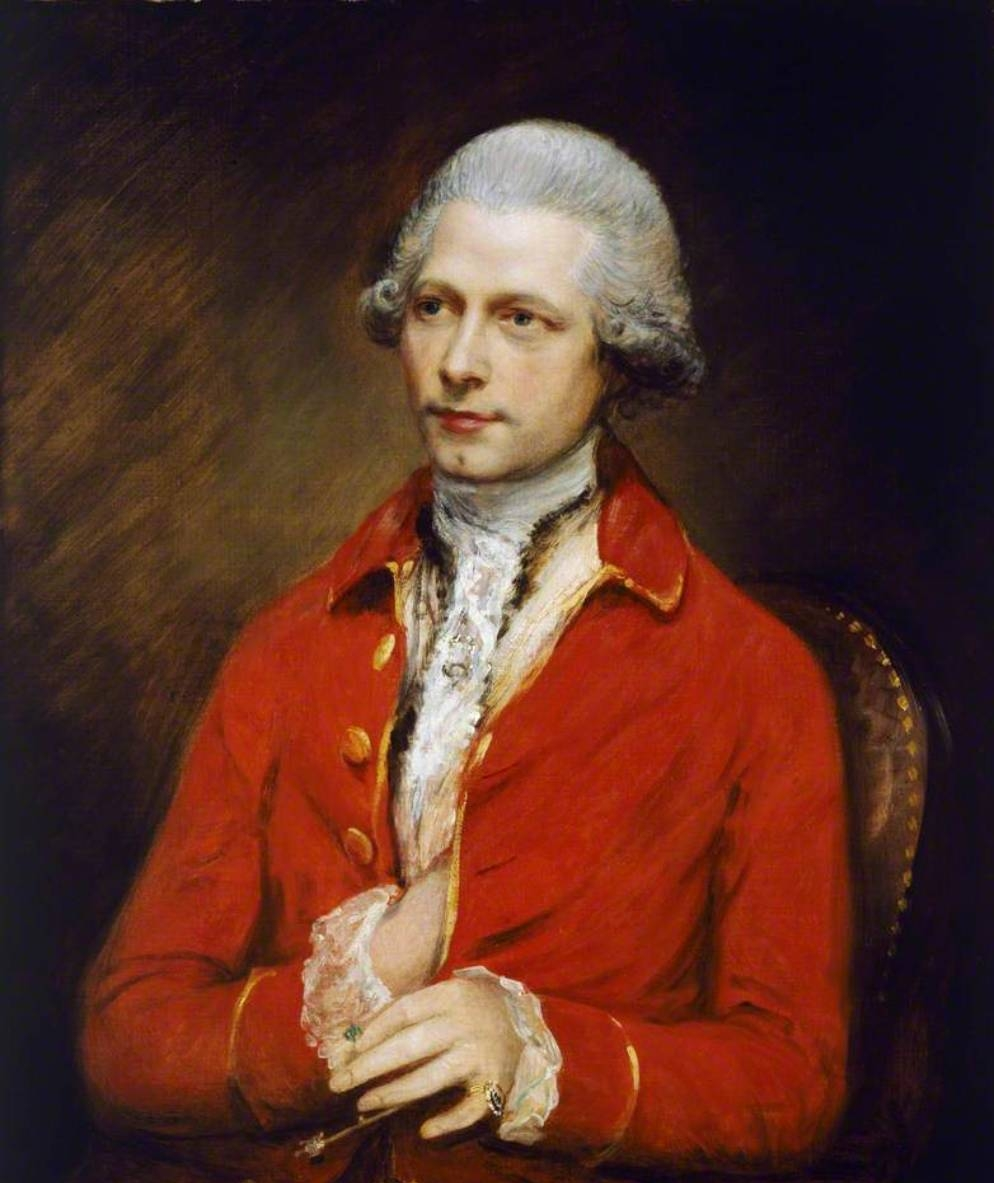
- Portrait of John Joseph Merlin by Thomas Gainsborough, 1781
- Born: Jean-Joseph Merlin; 6 September 1735; Huy, Liège Province
- Died: 8 May 1803 (aged 67); Paddington, London

John Joseph Merlin (born Jean-Joseph Merlin, 6 September 1735 – 8 May 1803) was a Freemason, clock-maker, musical-instrument maker, and inventor from the Prince-Bishopric of Liège in the Holy Roman Empire. He moved to England in 1760. By 1766, he was working with James Cox and creating automatons such as Cox's timepiece and the Silver Swan. By 1773, he was designing and making innovative keyboard instruments. In 1783, he opened Merlin's Mechanical Museum in Princes Street, Hanover Square, London, a meeting-place for the gentry and nobility. In addition to his clocks, musical instruments and automata, Merlin is credited with the invention of inline skates in the 1760s. He was referred to by contemporaries as "The Ingenious Mechanic". He was friendly with composer Joseph Haydn.

== Life ==
External videos
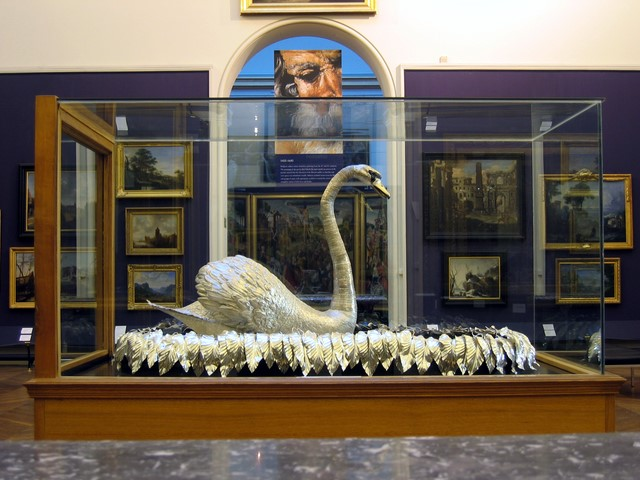
- "Silver swan automaton", at the Bowes Museum
- "Dancing Silver Swan" with narrator
- "Servicing The Bowes Museum's Silver Swan"

Jean-Joseph Merlin was born on 6 September 1735, in Huy, in what was then the Prince-Bishopric of Liège and is now in Belgium, Wallonia. His parents were blacksmith Maximilien Joseph Merlin and his wife Marie-Anne Levasseur. He was baptised the same day as he was born, at the parish church of Saint-Pierre-Outre-Meuse in Huy. A broadsheet obituary and later sources give his birthdate incorrectly as 17 September 1735.

Merlin's parents had married in 1732. Merlin was the third of six children; his mother died when he was eight. Merlin's father remarried at least once, to Marie Therese Dechesalle in 1743, and had another child, Charles Merlin. The family moved several times. From ages 19 to 25, Merlin lived in Paris, where he was involved in the Paris Academy of Sciences.

Merlin arrived in England on 24 May 1760, as a technical advisor to the new Spanish Ambassador to London, Joaquín Atanasio Pignatelli de Aragón y Moncayo, conde de Fuentes (15th). As of 1763, Jérôme Lalande recorded that Merlin had helped to complete a large barrel organ which was built for the Princess of Wales. In 1764, he met the 8 year old Wolfgang Amadeus Mozart who tried out the new organ.

By 1766, Merlin was working as a mechanician with British jeweller and goldsmith James Cox. As Cox's chief mechanician, Merlin worked with him to create pieces such as Cox's barometric clock (before 1768) and the Silver Swan (1773). In addition, Merlin acted as a manager and curator of Cox's Jewelry Museum in Spring Gardens, which became a favoured gathering-place of fashionable London between 1772 and 1775.

Horace Walpole referred to the sort of creations displayed by Cox and Merlin as "scientific toys". Fanny Burney's characters visit Cox's museum and debate the significance of such creations in her novel Evelina. Samuel Johnson asserts the underlying importance of such efforts, writing of a visit to Cox's Museum in 1772:

"It may sometimes happen that the greatest efforts of ingenuity have been exerted in trifles; yet the same principles and expedients may be applied to more valuable purposes, and the movements, which put into action machines of no use but to raise the wonder of ignorance, may be employed to drain fens, or manufacture metals, to assist the architect, or preserve the sailor."

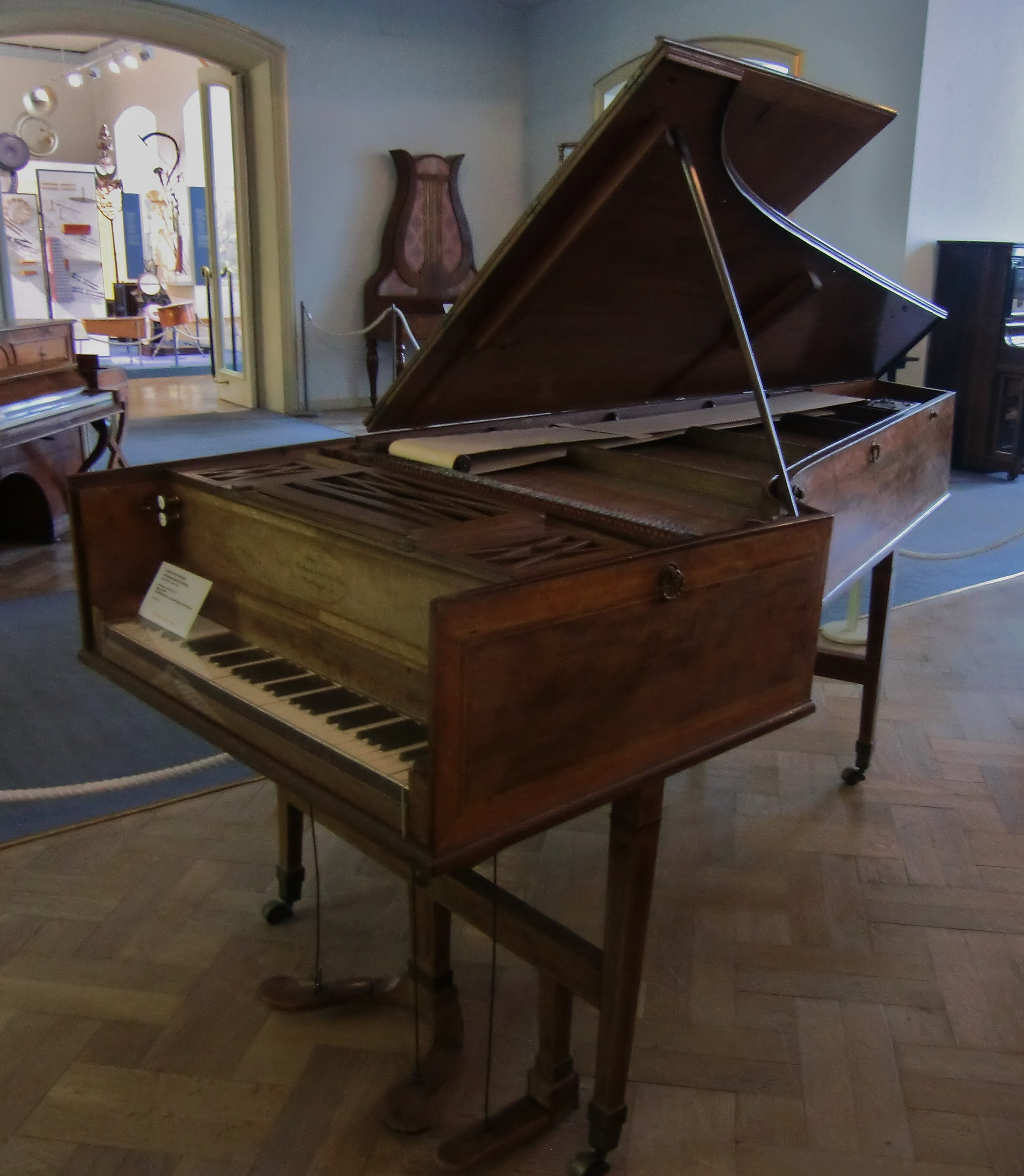
Harpsichord-Piano, 1780, Deutsches Museum Munich

By 1773, Merlin was also actively designing and making keyboard instruments. He was granted patent (No. 1081) on 12 September 1774, for a pianoforte stop that could be fitted to a harpsichord. Between 1773 and early 1782, instruments were made to his designs at a workshop at 7 Gresse Street, supervised by Louis Lavigne Verel. One of the combined harpsichord-pianofortes that Merlin manufactured may have been owned by Empress Catherine the Great. A harpsichord-piano from 1779 is in the collection of the Museum of Fine Arts, Boston, and one from 1780 is in Munich's Deutsches Museum. Merlin also experimented with violins and violas.

Merlin moved in increasingly illustrious circles, socializing with Londoners from the gentry and nobility. Friend and musicologist Charles Burney commissioned his instruments, and even played one of them in a courtroom to defend Merlin's patent. Johann Christian Bach performed publicly on Merlin's instruments, and around 1774 Johann Christian Fischer was painted by Gainsborough standing next to one of Merlin's pianos. Thomas Gainsborough painted Merlin himself in 1781, holding a pocket beam balance which he had invented.

Even though she regarded him as a foreigner, novelist Fanny Burney wrote of Merlin with affection:

"He is a great favourite in our house...He is very diverting also in conversation. There is a singular simplicity in his manners. He speaks his opinion upon all subjects and about all persons with the most undisguised freedom. He does not, though a foreigner, want words; but he arranges and pronounces them very comically. He is humbly grateful for all civilities that are shown him; but is warmly and honestly resentful for the least slight."

While he was certainly respected for his talents, Merlin also seems to have cultivated his image as an eccentric. He took advantage of balls and masquerades to promote himself, appearing in public in odd costumes and showing off his inventions. The Morning Post and Daily Advertiser of 4 March 1778 declared "Mr. Merlin, the mechanic" to be the most striking Character of the 900 people attending a masquerade ball at the Pantheon. Merlin appeared "as a gouty gentleman, in a chair of his own construction, which, by a transverse direction of two winches, he wheeled about himself, with great facility to any part of the room." At an event held by Teresa Cornelys in Carlisle House, Soho Square, Merlin appeared somewhat disastrously attempting to play the violin while on roller skates of his own invention- he would proceed to crash into and break a mirror, along with the violin he was playing, and injure himself quite severely.

By April 1783, Merlin was putting his musical instruments and his automatons on display at his own museum. Advertisements invited readers to visit his Museum of Musical Instruments and Mechanical Inventions at No. 2, Princes Street, Hanover Square, London. Well-off Londoners could meet their friends at Merlin's Mechanical Museum in the afternoon or evening, pay to see the exhibits, and drink tea or coffee for another shilling.

Around 1785, Merlin unsuccessfully proposed the construction of an elaborate "Necromantic Cave", in which he would take on the persona of Ambrosius Merlin to entertain visitors with musical instruments and mechanical automata, alternating darkness and light in ways that may have related to aesthetic ideas of the Sublime. In November 1787, Merlin either moved or expanded to 11 Princes Street.

On 17 September 1783, Joseph Merlin married Ann Goulding at the parish of St. Saviour, Southwark. The couple resided in Southwark. The parish register for St. Andrew Holborn gives their address as Shoe Lane, not at the museum in Princes Street. The couple eventually had two children: A daughter, Ann Johanna, baptized 19 November 1786, who was married in 1820; and a son, Joseph, baptized 18 May 1790. The marriage seems to have been kept separate from Merlin's public life; advertisements for an apartment in Princes Street in 1786 refer to Merlin as a "single man".

Ann Goulding, Merlin's wife, died in 1793 and was buried at Christ Church, Southwark, on 22 November - just ten years after their marriage. Their daughter Ann Merlin apparently went to live with an aunt, Elizabeth Hazell, and is identified in Merlin's 1803 will as his "niece".

Merlin seems to have withdrawn from public life for a time after his wife's death in 1793. He advertised no new inventions until April 1795. From then on, public appearances and inventions are mixed intermittently with reports of his ill health. Merlin's last public appearance may have been in January 1803, when he appeared in Hyde-park in a carriage without horses, powered by a windlass.

== Inventions ==
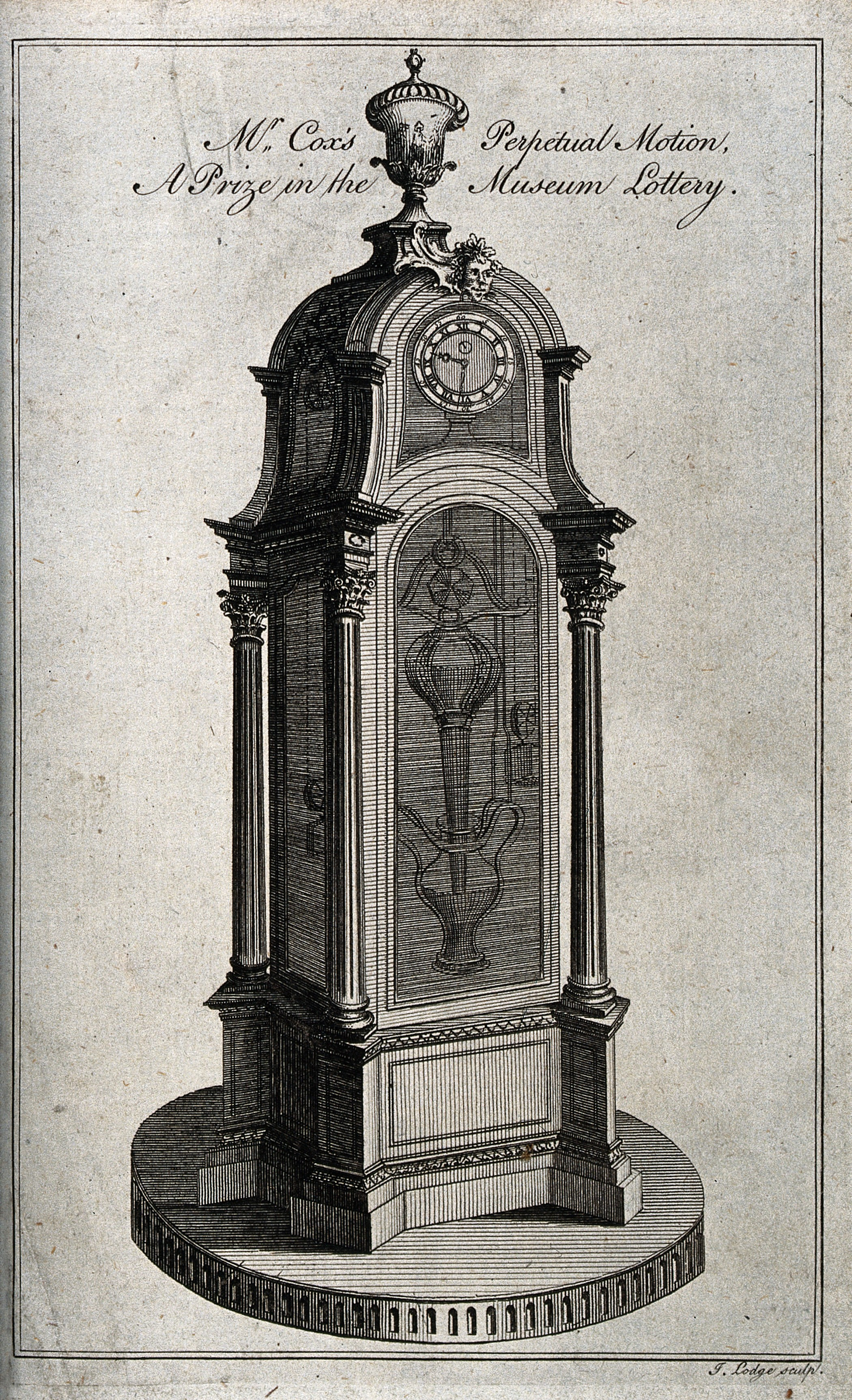
Cox's timepiece, powered by atmospheric pressure

Merlin is noted for the manufacture of ingenious automata, in particular the Silver Swan that he developed with London jeweller and entrepreneur James Cox. Merlin also created a wide variety of mechanical clocks. One of the most notable was Cox's timepiece, which was powered by changes in atmospheric pressure. Another of Merlin's timepieces is the Merlin Band Clock.

Merlin also developed musical instruments. A pianoforte with a six-octave span, which he made in 1775, preceded by fifteen years Broadwood's five-and-a-half octave grand piano. He made improvements to the harpsichord and created a barrel-organ/harpsichord which played nineteen tunes.

Merlin invented inline skates with two wheels in the 1760s. Thomas Busby's Concert Room and Orchestra Anecdotes (1805) mentions an accident Merlin had while demonstrating his "skaites":

"One of his ingenious novelties was a pair of skaites contrived to run on wheels. Supplied with these and a violin, he mixed in the motley group of one of Mrs Cowleys' masquerades at Carlisle House; when not having provided the means of retarding his velocity, or commanding its direction, he impelled himself against a mirror of more than five hundred pounds value, dashed it to atoms, broke his instrument to pieces and wounded himself most severely."

Other inventions of Merlin's include: a self-propelled wheelchair, a prosthetic device for "a person born with stumps only", whist cards for the blind, a pump for expelling "foul air", a communication system for summoning servants, a pedal-operated revolving tea table, and a mechanical chariot with an early form of odometer.

== Death ==
Merlin died in Paddington, London, on 8 May 1803. His collection was sold to Thomas Weeks of Great Windmill Street. Weeks died in 1834, at which time Merlin's creations were auctioned off with Weeks' other possessions. One of Merlin's automatons, a dancer with an automated bird, was bought at the auction by Charles Babbage for 35 pounds. He had seen it as a child at Merlin's Mechanical Museum.
