= Dunedin Astronomical Society =

Astronimcal organisation based in Dunedin, New Zealand

The Dunedin Astronomical Society Incorporated (DAS) is an amateur astronomical group operating from the Beverly-Begg Observatory in Dunedin, New Zealand. It is affiliated with the Royal Astronomical Society of New Zealand and the Otago Institute.

The objectives of the society are to:

- Promote astronomy and telescope making
- Maintain the Beverly-Begg Observatory and provide regular public viewing nights and astronomical instruction for privately arranged groups
- Aid members by providing a regular programme of lectures and practical demonstrations on astronomical and telescope making topics
- To provide access to astronomical equipment owned by the society to members and to upgrade such equipment as the society deems appropriate

Membership of the society is open to anyone interested in astronomy.

== History ==
The Society was established on Monday 27 September 1910 by a meeting in "The Chemistry Room" of the University of Otago as the "Otago Astronomical Society". R. Gilkison was elected president with Rev. P. W. Fairclough and J. M. Garrow elected as vice-presidents. Thompson Lamb was Hon. Secretary and W. S. Wilson Hon. Treasurer.

In 1911 the Society affiliated with the Otago Institute to become the Astronomical Section of the institute. The following year a membership of 254 was reported in the transactions of the Royal Society of New Zealand (of which the Otago Institute was the Otago branch).

For a short time around 1915 the society had a "Telescope House" on Tanna Hill in the grounds of the Otago University. However the university required the land for a building project and the society had to look elsewhere for a permanent home. A site near the Dunedin Botanic Gardens was selected, but construction was delayed by World War I. In 1920 the current site for the Beverly-Begg Observatory in Belleknowes was chosen instead and construction of the observatory was completed in 1922.

In 1948 the Telescope Makers' Club asked to make use of the Society's facilities and subsequently joined with the Society.

In the 1960s the society built an annex on to the observatory to provide a more convenient area for meetings, talks and telescope construction.

The Dunedin Astronomical Society became an incorporated society in 2000 and was registered as a charitable society by the New Zealand Charities Commission in 2009.

In 2002 the society gained access to a cottage near Middlemarch for use as a dark sky site.

=== Centennial celebrations ===
In 2010 DAS celebrated its centennial year with range of activities. As a part of the celebrations through the year the RASNZ Conference was hosted by the Society at the Otago Museum.

The main centennial events however started on Monday 27 September 2010 when a public meeting was held by the Society in the same room that was used for the meeting that established the society 100 years to the day previously. The minutes of the original meeting were read and a motion was passed taking the minutes as a true and accurate record (although none of those present at the 2010 meeting had been present at the previous meeting). Motions honouring the past officers of the Society and the association the Society had enjoyed with the Otago Institute were passed with acclamation. A talk was then given by amateur astronomer Dr. Grant Christie of Auckland's Stardome Observatory concerning the changes in our understanding of astronomy and the universe during the last 100 years.

During the following weekend a tour by bus of various sites of historical astronomical interest was conducted and culminated with the unveiling of a plaque on the University of Otago's Consumer and Applied Sciences (formally the Home Science building) near the site of the Society's first meeting and the site of the original "Telescope House".

== Current activities ==
DAS meets twice a month through most of the year with meetings on the first and third Tuesday of each month (except January). The first meeting of each month generally features an astronomy related talk presented by a society member or an invited speaker. The second meeting of each month focuses more on practical astronomy in the form of an observation session (if the weather is kind), or discussion and examination of astronomical equipment and techniques.

During winter months (when daylight saving time is not in force) the society opens the Beverly-Begg Observatory to the public on Sunday nights starting at 7:00pm.

The society also makes access to the observatory available to education and private groups by arrangement.

Society members make regular use of The Cottage, a farm cottage near Middlemarch that is available for use as a dark sky site. In 2013 piers were installed to facilitate the use of the society's and member's Sky-Watcher EQ6 telescope mounts.

=== Science program ===
A magnetometer and data logger are installed at The Cottage to collect data for Dr. Yuki Obana of the Osaka Electro-Communication University. The data is used for solar wind research.

Society members are very active in occultation observation using the C14 telescope housed in the Beverly-Begg Observatory with a Watec astronomical video camera and IOTA-VTI video timing system.

A SBIG ST8300M camera is used for astrometry and photometry in several observation programs.

In 2015 members of the society recorded an important Pluto occultation on 29 June 2015 a couple of weeks before the New Horizons fly by of Pluto.

== See also ==
- List of astronomical societies
