= Torsion pendulum clock =

Clock that uses a torsion pendulum to keep time

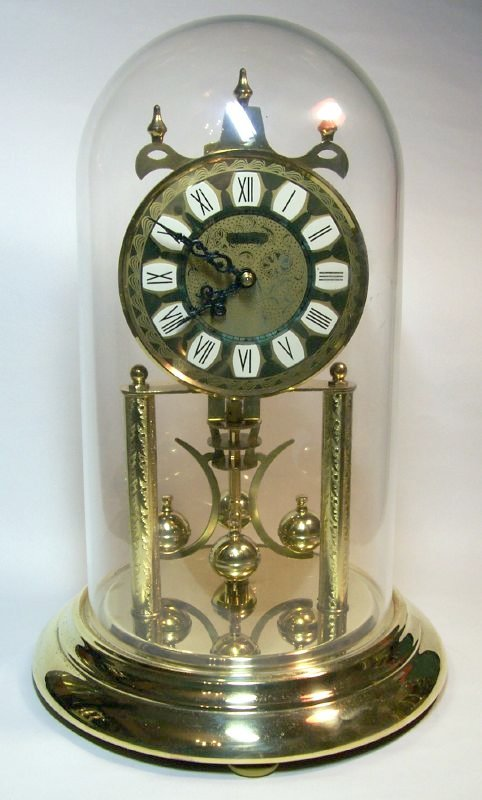
Anniversary clock manufactured by S. Haller & Söhne Co.

Kundo reverts here. For other use, see Kundo (disambiguation)

A torsion pendulum clock, more commonly known as an anniversary clock or 400-day clock, is a mechanical clock which keeps time with a mechanism called a torsion pendulum. This is a weighted disk or wheel, often a decorative wheel with three or four chrome balls on ornate spokes, suspended by a thin wire or ribbon called a torsion spring (also known as "suspension spring"). The torsion pendulum rotates about the vertical axis of the wire, twisting it, instead of swinging like an ordinary pendulum. The force of the twisting torsion spring reverses the direction of rotation, so the torsion pendulum oscillates slowly, clockwise and counterclockwise. The clock's gears apply a pulse of torque to the top of the torsion spring with each rotation to keep the wheel going. The Atmos clock, made by the Swiss company Jaeger-LeCoultre, is another style of this clock. The wheel and torsion spring function similarly to a watch's balance wheel and hairspring, as a harmonic oscillator to control the rate of the clock's hands.

== Description ==
Torsion clocks are unusually delicate, ornamental machines which require stable conditions to operate properly. The clocks are protected from the vagaries of air currents by a glass dome. Clocks of this style were first made by Anton Harder around 1880, and they are also known as 400-day or anniversary clocks because many can run for an entire year or more on a single winding.

== Mechanism ==
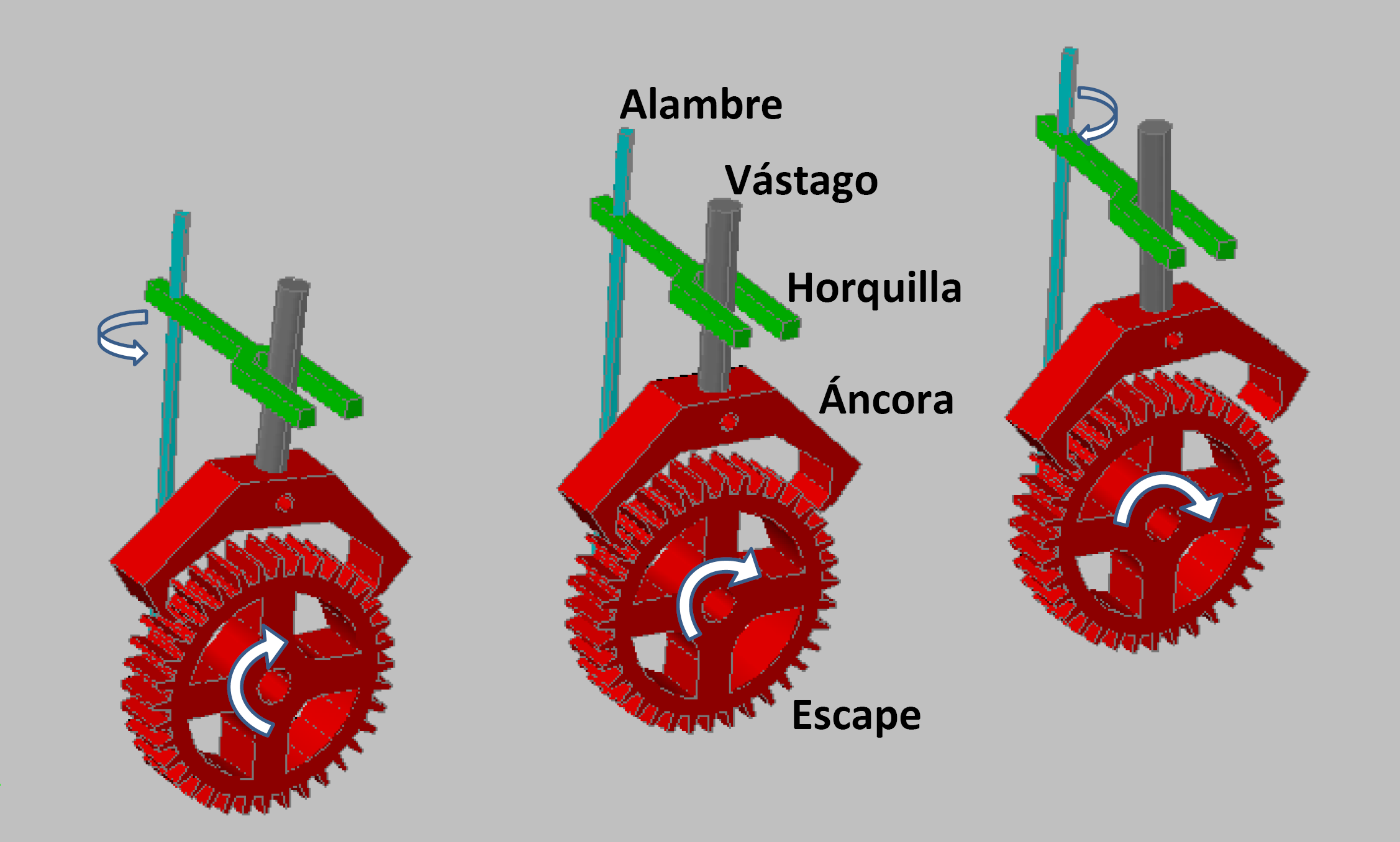
Torsion clock schematics

Torsion clocks are capable of running much longer between windings than clocks with an ordinary pendulum, because the torsion pendulum rotates slowly and takes little energy. However they can be difficult to set up, and are usually not as accurate as clocks with ordinary pendulums. One reason is that the oscillation period of the torsion pendulum changes with temperature due to the temperature-dependent elasticity of the spring. Suspension spring wire of Nivarox, a low thermal elasticity coefficient alloy, is now the standard for use; this makes the clock much more accurate. The clock can be made faster or slower by an adjustment screw mechanism on the torsion pendulum that moves the weight balls in or out from the axis. The closer in the balls are, the smaller the moment of inertia of the torsion pendulum and the faster it will turn, what causes the clock to speed up.

One oscillation of the torsion pendulum usually takes 12, 15, or 20 seconds. The escapement mechanism, which changes the rotational motion of the clock's gears to pulses to drive the torsion pendulum, works rather like an anchor escapement. A crutch device at the top of the torsion spring engages a lever with two anchor-shaped arms; the two arms alternately engage the teeth of the escape wheel. As the anchor releases a tooth of the escape wheel, the lever, which is fixed to the anchor, moves to one side and, via the crutch, gives a small twist to the top of the torsion spring. This is just enough to keep the oscillation going.

The Atmos clock, made by Jaeger-LeCoultre, is a type of torsion pendulum clock that winds itself. The mainspring which powers the clock's wheels is kept wound by small changes in atmospheric pressure and/or local temperature, using a bellows mechanism. Thus no winding key or battery is needed, and it can run for years without human intervention.

== History ==
The torsion pendulum was invented by Robert Leslie in 1793. The torsion pendulum clock was first invented and patented by American Aaron Crane in 1841. He made clocks that would run up to one year on a winding. He also made precision astronomical regulator clocks based on the torsion pendulum, but only four were sold.

The German Anton Harder apparently independently invented and patented the torsion clock in 1879-1880. He was inspired by watching a hanging chandelier rotate after a servant had turned it to light the candles. He formed the firm Jahresuhrenfabrik ('Year Clock Factory') and designed a clock that would run for a year, but its accuracy was poor. He sold the patent in 1884 to F. A. L. deGruyter of Amsterdam, who allowed the patent to expire in 1887. Other firms entered the market, beginning the German mass production of these clocks.

Although they were successful commercially, torsion clocks remained poor timekeepers. In 1951, Charles Terwilliger of the Horolovar Co. invented a temperature compensating suspension spring, which allowed fairly accurate clocks to be made.
