= Kundo (disambiguation) =

Kundo may refer to:

- A German manufacturer of torsion pendulum clocks in the early 20th century
- Kundo: Age of the Rampant, a 2014 South Korean film
- Kundō Koyama, a Japanese writer
- Kundo, a deity in the fictional World of Greyhawk
