= Cox's timepiece =

Clock developed in the 1760s by James Cox

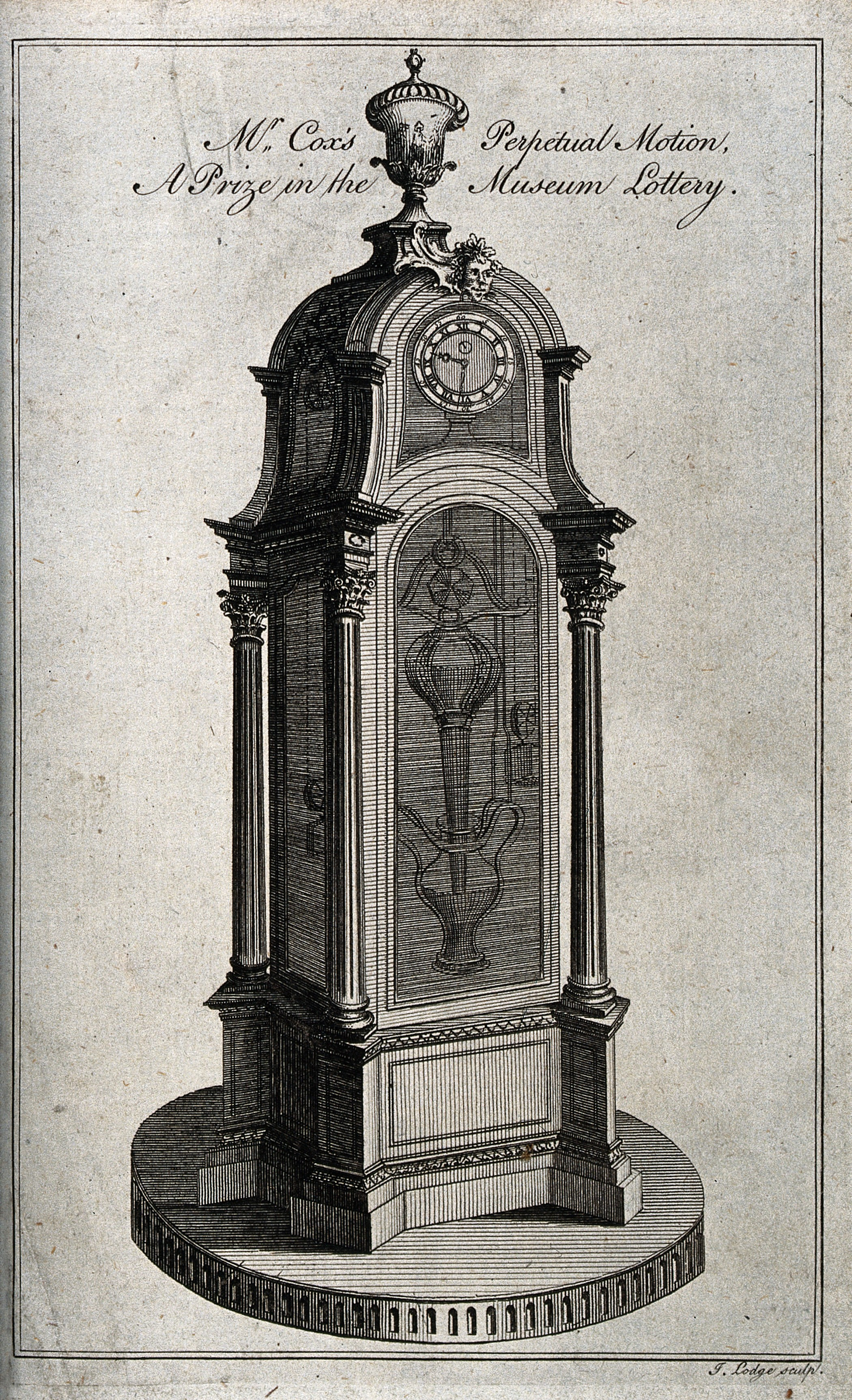
drawing of Cox's perpetual motion

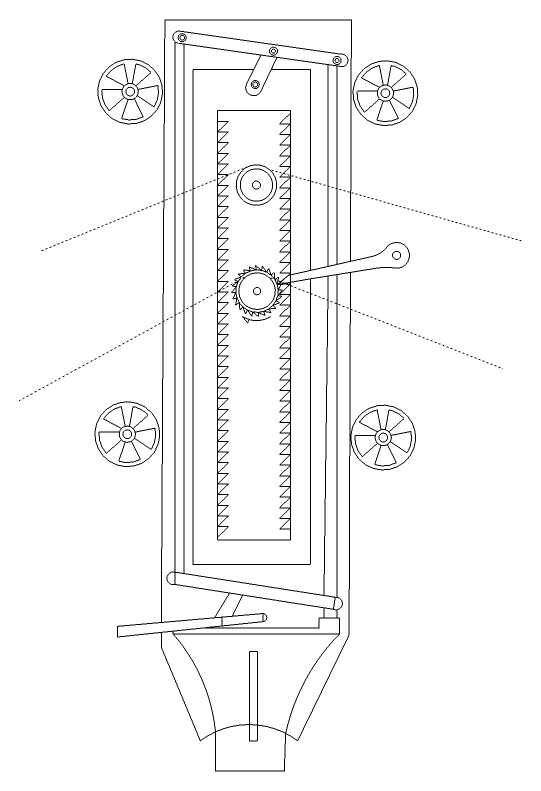
Cox timepiece winding switch

Cox's timepiece is a clock developed in the 1760s by James Cox. It was developed in collaboration with John Joseph Merlin (with whom Cox also worked on developing automata). Cox claimed that his design was a true perpetual motion machine, but as the device is powered from changes in atmospheric pressure via a mercury barometer, this is not the case. The clock still exists, but was deactivated at the time of its relocation to the Victoria and Albert Museum in London.

== Design and history ==
The clock is similar to other mechanical clocks, except that it does not need winding. The change of pressure in the Earth's atmosphere acts as an external energy source and causes sufficient movement of the winding mechanism. This keeps the mainspring coiled inside the barrel. The clock is designed to enable the timepiece to run indefinitely and overwinding is prevented by a safety mechanism. The prime mover, encased in a finely detailed clock body, is a Fortin mercury barometer. The barometer contained 68 kilograms (150 pounds) of mercury (approximately 5 litres).

== Similar clocks ==
A similar design is Cornelis Drebbel's circa 1610 device that told the time, date, and season. The gold machine was mounted in a globe on pillars and was powered by changes in air pressure (a sealed glass tub with liquid varied in volume through atmospheric pressure changes, rewinding constantly). It is unknown whether Cox was aware of Drebbel's device.

The Atmos, manufactured by Jaeger LeCoultre is a modern clock which is similar to Cox's clock although the main driving force is generated from temperature differential, instead of pressure differential.

== See also ==
- History of perpetual motion machines
- Beverly Clock (1864)

== External articles and further reading ==
Victoria and Albert Museum, Longcase Clock | Weeks, Thomas | Cox, James

=== Journals ===
- William Nicholson, "Concerning those perpetual motions which are produced in machines by the rise and fall of the barometer or thermometrical variations in the dimensions of bodies". Philosophical Journal.
- William Nicholson, Philosophical Journal, vol I, 1799, p375

=== Books ===
- Arthur W. J. G. Ord-hume, "Clockwork Music", Allen & Unwin, London 1973.
- John Joseph Merlin, "The Ingenious Mechanick". The Greater London Council, The Iveagh Bequest, Kenwood, Hampstead Lane, London, © 1985.

=== Radio ===
- John H. Lienhard (1991). The Engines of Our Ingenuity. Episode 527. NPR. KUHF-FM Houston. Cox's Perpetual-Motion Machine.
- John H. Lienhard (1991). The Engines of Our Ingenuity. Episode 630. NPR. KUHF-FM Houston. John Joseph Merlin.
