= Beverly-Begg Observatory =

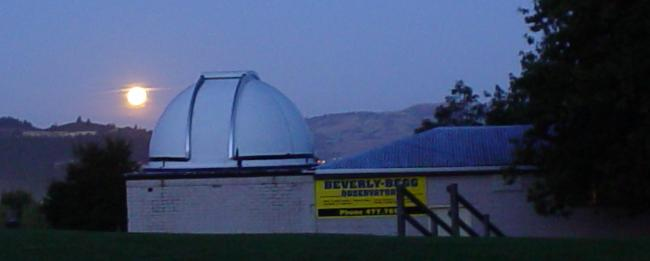
- Observatory building, December 2007
- Named after: Arthur Beverly
- Observatory code: R58
- Location: Belleknowes, Dunedin, New Zealand
- Coordinates: 45.87249°S 170.49163°E
- Altitude: 140 metres (460 ft)
- Established: 1922
- Website: Dunedin Astronomical Society
- Related media on Commons

The Beverly-Begg Observatory is a New Zealand astronomical observatory, situated in Robin Hood Park in the Belleknowes part of Dunedin's town belt. It was established in 1922 by the Dunedin Astronomical Society (DAS) and is the home of the group.

== History ==
The observatory is named after local astronomers Arthur Beverly (1822-1907) and John Campbell Begg (1876-1965).

The annex was added in the 1960s.

On 6 September 2008 the society unveiled a new 35 cm Celestron instrument on a Software Bisque Paramount ME robotic telescope mount with camera totalling $38,000, replacing a 30.5 cm reflector telescope that had been in use since 1973. In addition $9,000 was spent upgrading the observatory facilities, including raising the floor by 1 m and installing computer screens displaying images captured by the telescope.

== Operation ==
The observatory is open to the public on Sunday nights from 7:00 pm during the winter months (when New Zealand daylight saving time is not in force). Access for education and private groups may be made by arrangement through the Dunedin Astronomical Society's education officer.

The annex is used by the society for meetings and talks. The observatory facilities are available for DAS members to use.
