= Atmos clock =

Brand-name torsion pendulum clock

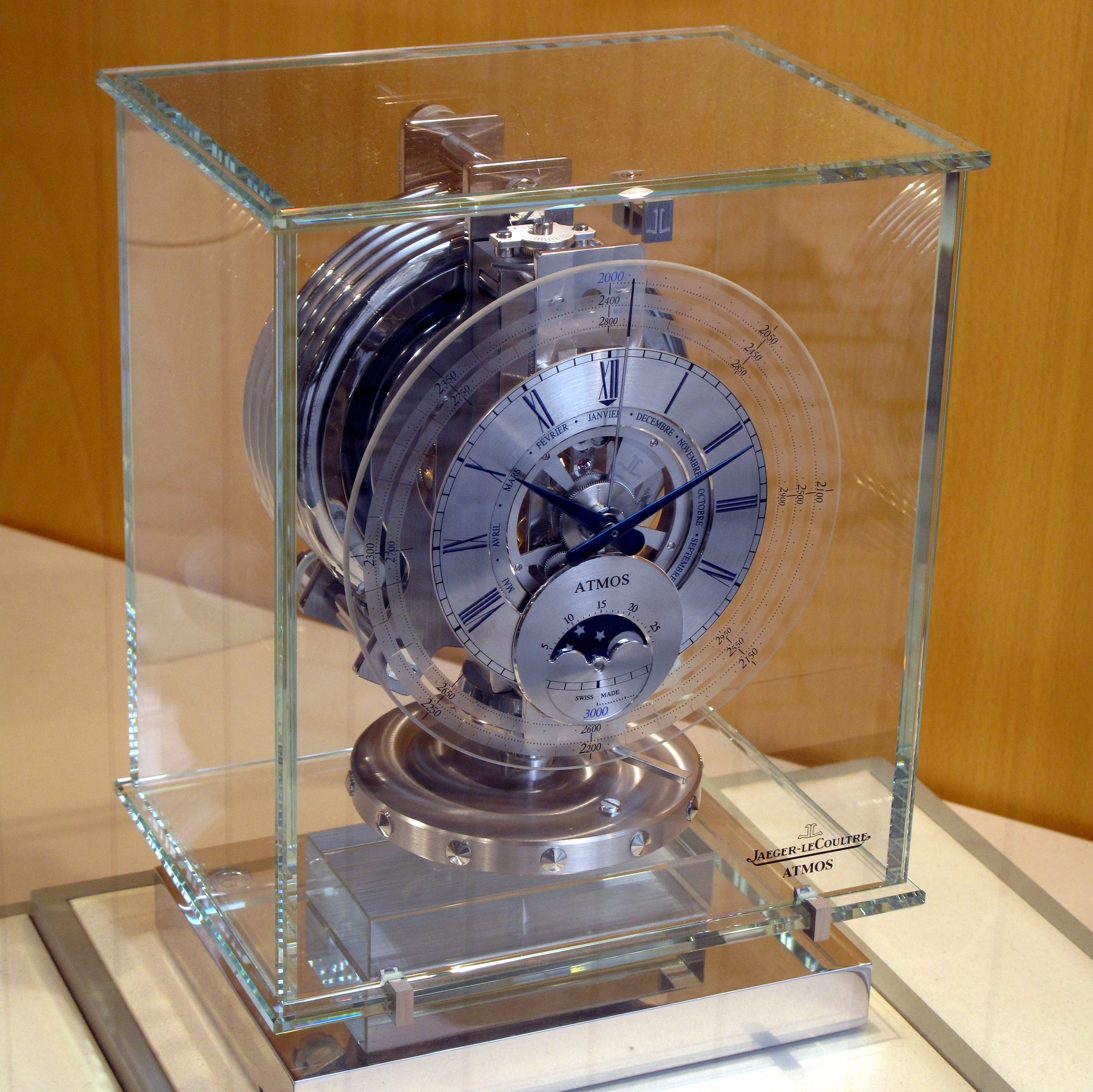
Jaeger-LeCoultre's Atmos clock on display.

Atmos is the brand name of a mechanical torsion pendulum clock manufactured by Jaeger-LeCoultre in Switzerland. The clock gets the energy it needs to run from temperature changes in the environment and does not need to be wound manually. It can run for years without human intervention.

The mechanism is driven by a mainspring, which is wound by the expansion and contraction of liquid and gaseous ethyl chloride in an internal hermetically sealed metal bellows. The ethyl chloride vaporises into an expansion chamber as the temperature rises, compressing a spiral spring; with a fall in temperature the gas condenses and the spiral spring expands, winding the mainspring. This motion constantly winds the mainspring. A temperature variation of only one degree in the range between 15 °C (59 °F) and 30 °C (86 °F), or a pressure variation of 3 mmHg, was calculated to provide energy for two days' operation for an early prototype, while for a more recent Atmos 540 model the corresponding value has been computed as 4.3 days per °C.

To run the clock on this small amount of energy, everything in the Atmos must be as friction-free as possible. For timekeeping it uses a torsion pendulum, which consumes less energy than an ordinary pendulum. The torsion pendulum has a period of precisely one minute; thirty seconds to rotate in one direction and thirty seconds to return to the starting position. This is thirty times slower than the 0.994 m (39.1 in) seconds pendulum typically found in a longcase clock, where each swing (or half-period) takes one second.

== History ==
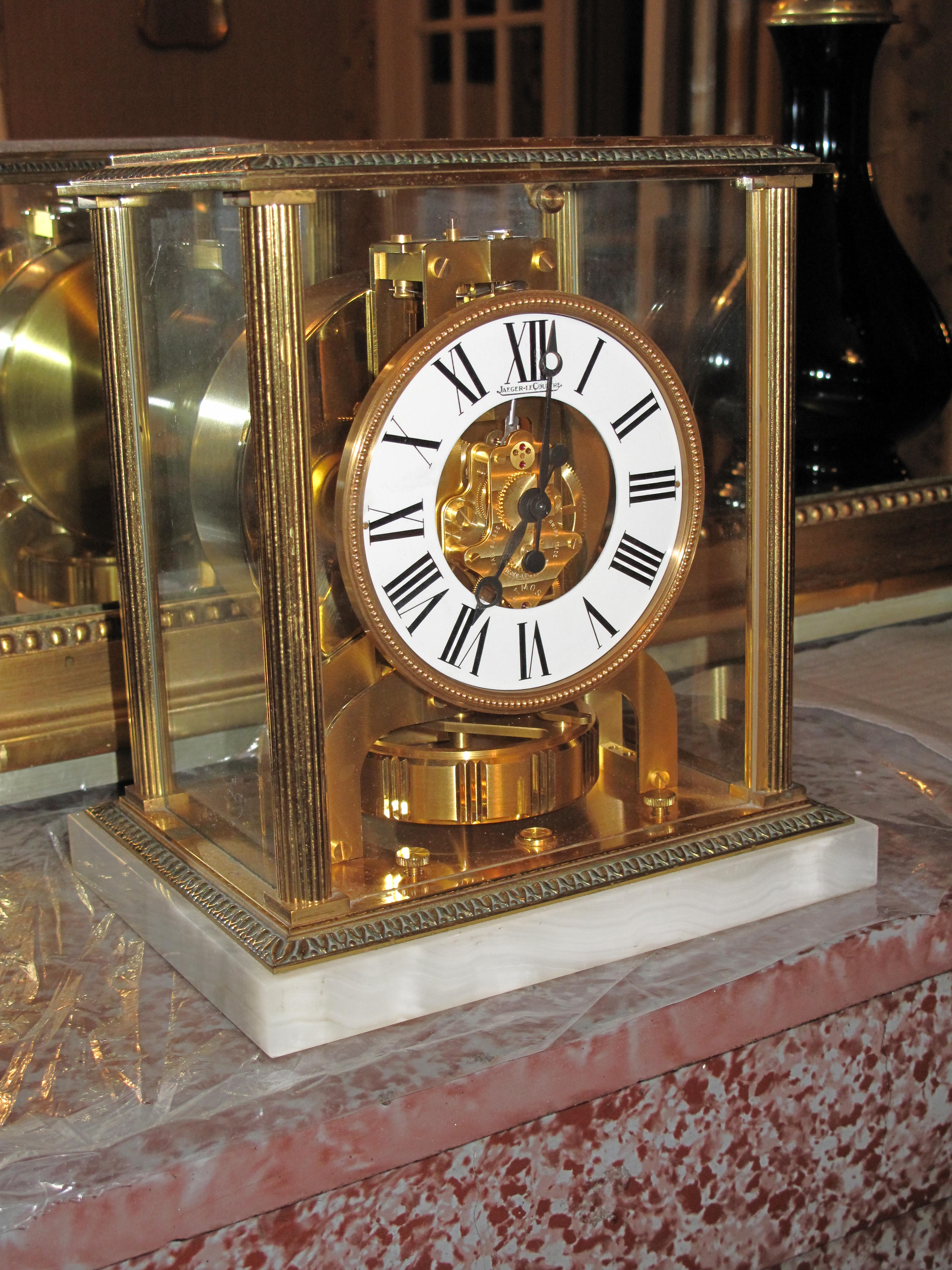
Older Atmos clock

The first clock powered by changes in atmospheric pressure and temperature was invented by Cornelis Drebbel in the early 17th century. Drebbel built as many as 18 of these, the two most notable being for King James VI & I of Britain, and Rudolf II of Bohemia. The King James clock was known as the Eltham Perpetuum, and was famous throughout Europe. It is mentioned in two works of Ben Jonson.

Clocks powered by atmospheric pressure and temperature changes were subsequently developed by Pierre de Rivaz in 1740, and by James Cox and John Joseph Merlin (Cox's timepiece) in the 1760s. The Beverly Clock in Dunedin, New Zealand, is still running despite never having been manually wound since its construction in 1864.

The first Atmos clock was designed by Jean-Léon Reutter, an engineer in Neuchâtel, Switzerland, in 1928. This noncommercial prototype, which predated the Atmos name but is now known unofficially as Atmos 0, was driven by a mercury-in-glass expansion device. The mechanism operated on temperature changes alone.

On 1 June 1929, Compagnie Générale de Radio (CGR) in France began manufacturing the first commercial model, Atmos 1, which used a mercury and ammonia bellows power source. On 27 July 1935, Jaeger-LeCoultre took over production of Atmos 1 while it developed a second design which used the present ethyl chloride power source. This model later named the Atmos 2, was announced on 15 January 1936, but problems delayed full production until mid-1939. Subsequent models were based on this design. To date, over 500,000 Atmos clocks have been produced.

== See also ==
- Atomic Clock
- Beverly Clock
- Clock of the Long Now
- Cox's timepiece
- List of clock types
