= Beverly Clock =

Long-running atmosphere-powered clock

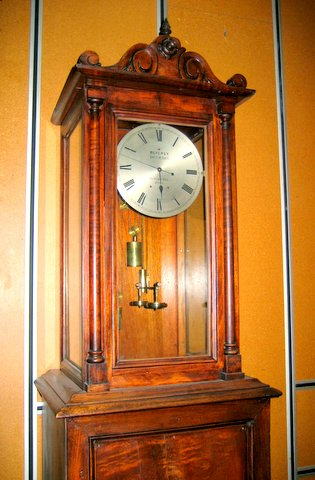
The Beverly Clock as it now stands in the Physics Department at the University of Otago

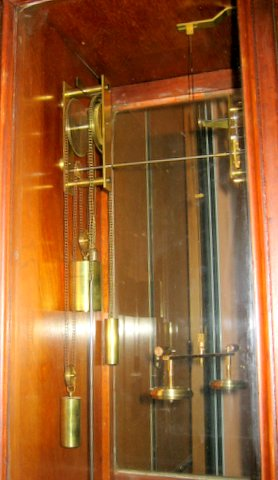
The inner mechanism of the Beverly clock showing chain, sprockets and torsional pendulum

The Beverly Clock is a clock in the 3rd-floor lift foyer of the Department of Physics at the University of Otago, Dunedin, New Zealand. The clock is still running despite never having been manually wound since its construction in 1864 by Arthur Beverly.

== Operation ==
The clock's mechanism is driven by variations in daily temperature and, to a lesser extent, in atmospheric pressure. Either causes the air in a one-cubic-foot (28-litre) airtight box to expand or contract, which pushes on a flexible diaphragm, or an oil-filled float. A temperature variation of 6 °F (3.3 °C) over the course of each day creates approximately enough pressure to raise a one-pound weight by one inch (equivalent to 13 mJ or 3.6 μWh), which drives the clock mechanism.

A similar mechanism in a commercially available clock that operates on the same principle is the Atmos clock, manufactured by the Swiss watchmaker Jaeger-LeCoultre.

While the clock has not been wound since it was made, it has stopped on a number of occasions, such as when its mechanism needed cleaning or there was a mechanical failure, and when the Physics Department moved to new quarters. Also, on occasions when the ambient temperature does not fluctuate sufficiently to supply the requisite amount of energy, the clock will not function. However, after environmental parameters readjust, the clock begins operating again.

== See also ==
- Long-term experiment
- Oxford Electric Bell (1840)
- Pitch drop experiment (1927)
- Cox's timepiece
- Clock of the Long Now
- Atmos clock, a commercially available clock working on a similar principle
- Temperature gradient ocean glider
