= James Cox (inventor) =

British jeweller, goldsmith and entrepreneur (c. 1723-1800)

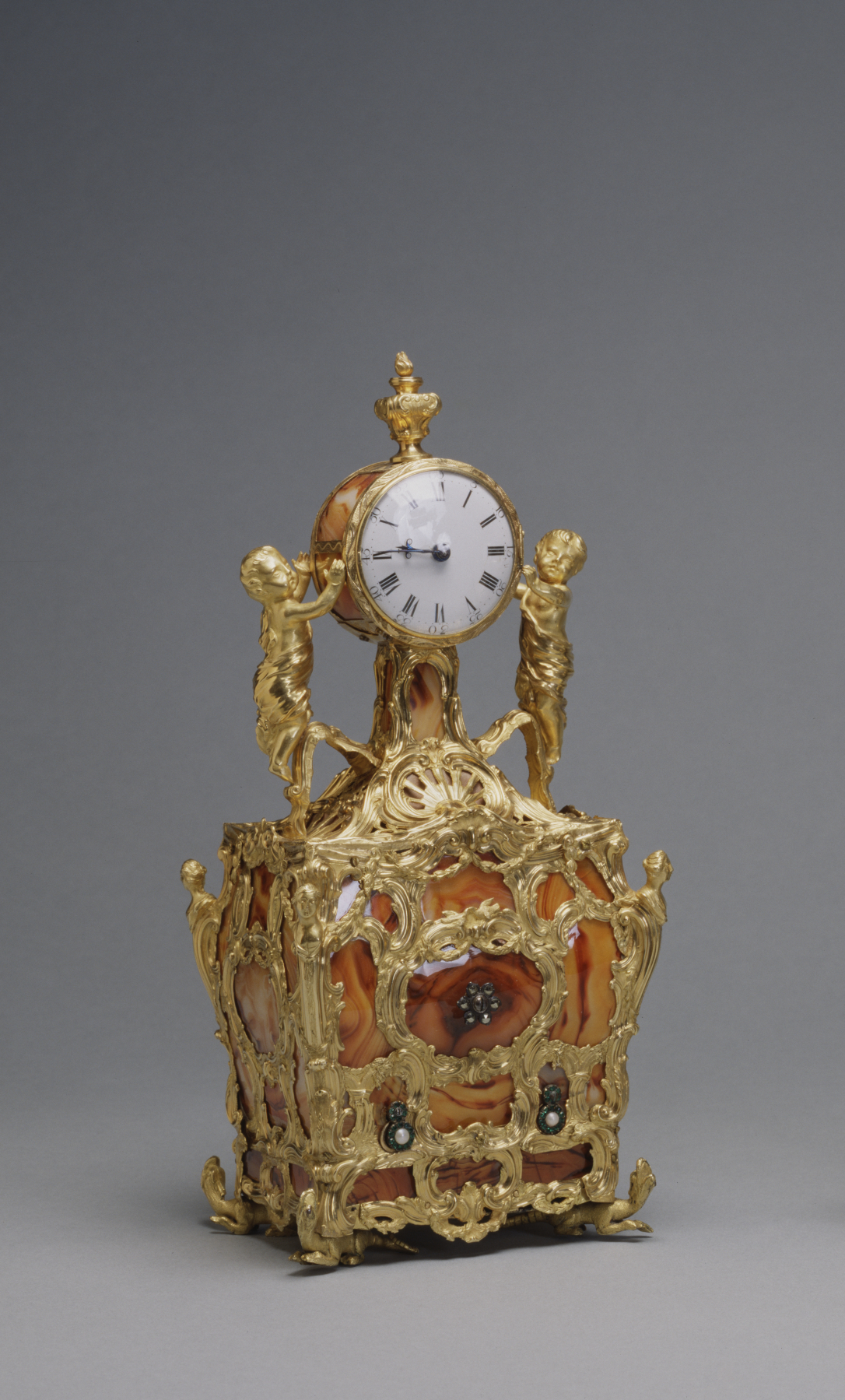
A typical "toy": a necessaire and watch by Cox (Walters Art Museum)

James Cox (c. 1723–1800) was a British jeweller, goldsmith and entrepreneur and the proprietor of Cox's Museum. He is now best known for creating ingenious automata and mechanical clocks, including Cox's timepiece, powered by atmospheric pressure, the Peacock Clock and the Silver Swan.

== Early career ==
Cox's career as a jeweler began as early as 1751, and his automatons were designed by artists like Joseph Nollekens and Johann Zoffany. In the 1760s John Joseph Merlin became his apprentice. Though he proclaimed himself a goldsmith, he employed a number of jewellers and manufacturers who may have done much of the work; that he was never a member of the goldsmith's guild further substantiates the claim that he subcontracted his work. Cox specialised in intricate clockwork curios encrusted with gold, silver, and jewels, referred to as "sing-songs." His primary market was the Far East, especially India and China, and the Chinese Qianlong Emperor possessed one of his automata, in the shape of a chariot. Cox's popularity was important to British trade: the tea trade ensured that British imports far outweighed their exports to China, and Cox helped redress the imbalance. His sing-songs initially reduced British trade deficit, but in the early 1770s Cox was stuck with a large inventory and a flooded eastern market. He liquidated some of his stock at Christie's in 1772, and used the remaining inventory to start his museum.

== Cox's Museum ==
In the 1770s Cox managed a private museum in the Great Room at Spring Gardens, London. He had been exhibiting his wares since at least 1769, though the official museum opened only in February, 1772. The site is near the Admiralty Arch, and would be among the most popular exhibition halls in London for the next half-century. Cox's Museum was so memorable that it was customary to refer to the room as "formerly Cox's Museum," and during the museum's run from 1772 to 1776 Cox's display eclipsed all other exhibits. His skill at advertising no doubt played a role in building the museum's popularity. Cox produced several catalogues and a collection of verses praising his museum, which had first been published in various London newspapers (some were probably planted by Cox).

Cox's Museum was among the most expensive exhibitions in London, and the price was purportedly to limit the number of patrons for security reasons. The museum was popular among London's upper classes and literati: James Boswell visited in 1772, at the recommendation of Samuel Johnson, and Frances Burney stages a debate about the uses of art at Cox's, in her novel Evelina. Playwright Richard Brinsley Sheridan pays tribute to Cox's Museum in The Rivals. As proprietor of the museum Cox may have purchased Oliver Cromwell's head as a curiosity.

Cox's Museum Act 1772
- Act of Parliament
- Parliament of Great Britain
- Long title: An Act for enabling James Cox, Jeweller, to dispose of his Museum, commonly called Cox's Museum, by Way of Chance, in such Manner as may be most for the Benefit of himself and his Creditors.
- Citation: 13 Geo. 3. c. 41
- Territorial extent: Great Britain

Dates
- Royal assent: 10 May 1773
- Commencement: 26 November 1772 (Note: Start of session.)
- Repealed: 30 July 1948
Other legislation
Repealed by	Statute Law Revision Act 1948

Status: Repealed

Text of statute as originally enacted

Though he hoped for royal patronage, and displayed, as was common, royal portraits in the museum, Cox never achieved his goal. In 1773 a special Act of Parliament (13 Geo. 3. c. 41) authorised Cox to break up his collection and sell pieces by lottery. The museum was removed from Spring Gardens in 1775, and after being briefly displayed at Mansion House by the Lord Mayor, was dissolved and sold by lottery in May 1775.

== Later career ==
In 1778 Cox went bankrupt for the second time. Cox despatched his son John Henry to Canton, China in 1782 to sell off an accumulated stock. In Canton, both James and John Henry became partners with Daniel Beale and his brother Thomas in the firm of Cox & Beale. Cox remained in business as a retailer, if no longer as an artist or manufacturer, until his death.

== Works ==
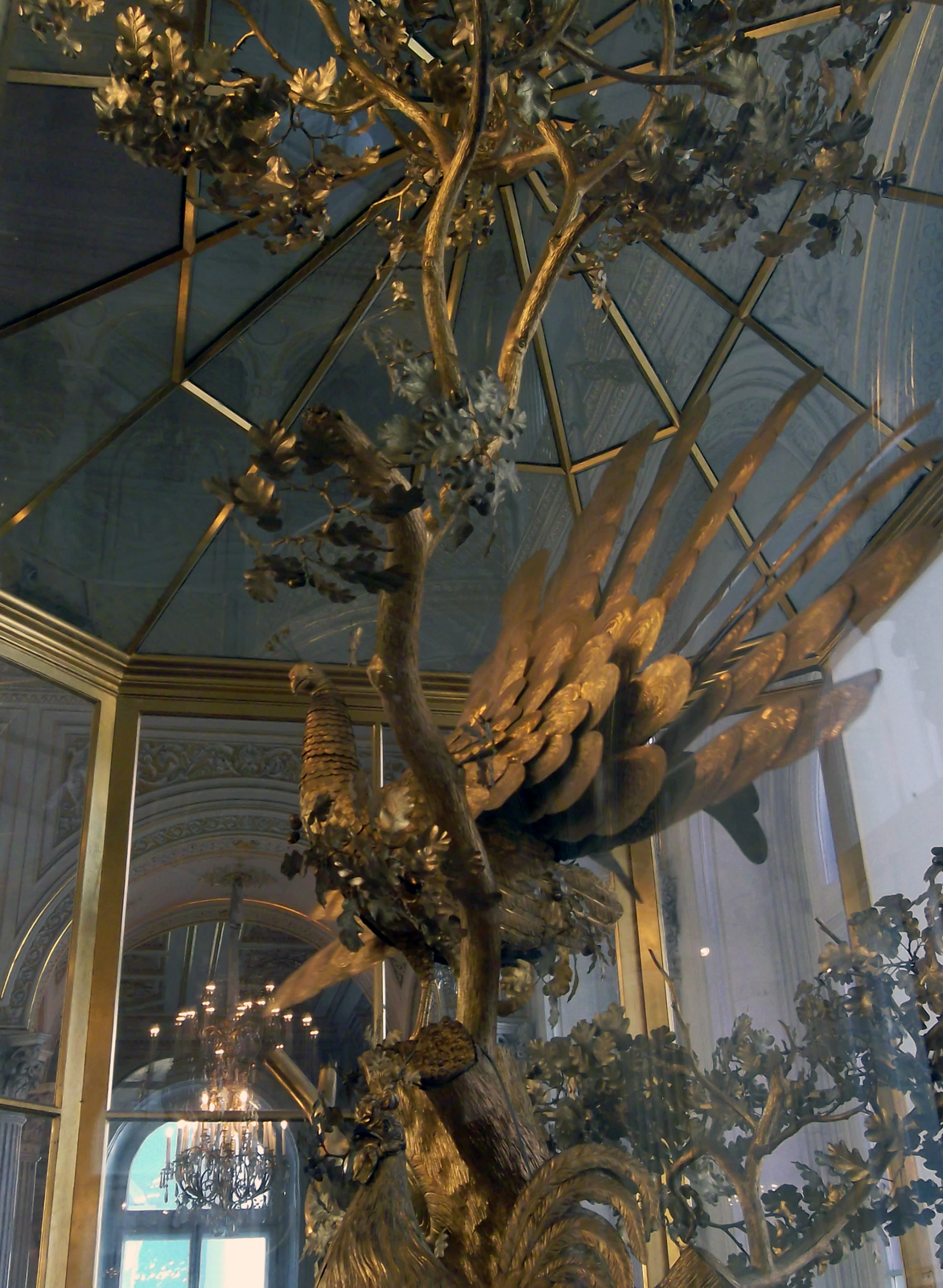
The Peacock Clock at the State Hermitage Museum

Among Cox's best known works are the Peacock Clock, now in the State Hermitage Museum in Saint Petersburg, and the Silver Swan, built by Cox in 1773 in conjunction with John Joseph Merlin, which is now exhibited at the Bowes Museum, Barnard Castle, Teesdale, County Durham. The swan, which can raise its neck, turn its head and (seemingly) pick up small fish, still functions, as is demonstrated daily.

At the time of the May 1775 lottery, a pair of diamond earrings garnered much attention, with Cox offering to buy them back from the winner for £5000. A musical clock designed by Cox, and previously owned by King Farouk of Egypt, sold on 12 December 2012 at a Bonhams London sale for £385,250 ($577,547).
