= Peacock Clock =

Large automaton featuring three life-sized mechanical birds

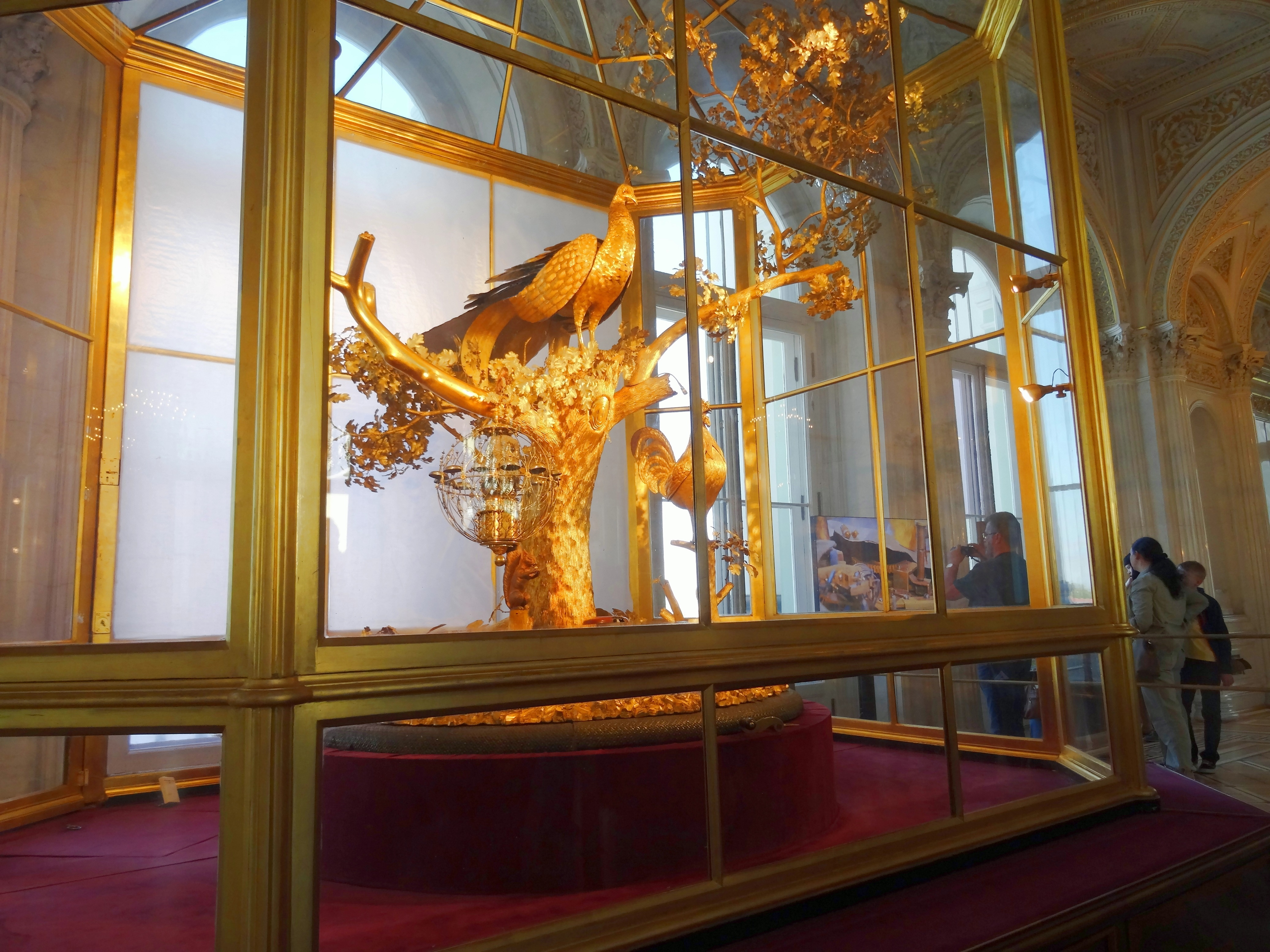
Peacock Clock

The Peacock Clock is a large automaton featuring three life-sized mechanical birds. It was manufactured by the entrepreneur James Cox in the 2nd half of the 18th century, and through the influence of Grigory Potemkin, it was acquired by Catherine the Great in 1781. Today, it is a prominent exhibit in the collections of the Hermitage Museum in Saint Petersburg. The clock is also shown daily on the Russian TV channel Russia-K.
