= Regauging =

Regauging may refer to

- track gauge conversion in railways
- something to do with gauge theory
- something to do with the Simple Magnetic Overunity Toy
