= Microwave News =

Trade magazine

Microwave News reports on the health and environmental impacts of electromagnetic fields (EMFs) and other types of non-ionizing radiation, with special emphasis on cell phones and power lines. It also covers radar, radio and TV broadcast towers and many related topics. Its headquarters is in New York City.

== History and profile ==
The first print issue was published in January 1981. In June 2003, the publication converted to a Web-based format. Microwave News is independent and is not aligned with any industry or government agency.

A complete archive of the print issues is available in PDF format at no charge from the Microwave News Web site. PDFs of the Web editions may also be downloaded.

A 1990 Time magazine profile of Microwave News and its editor, Louis Slesin, said that the newsletter is "meticulously researched and thoroughly documented."

In his 2000 book Voodoo Science, Robert L. Park described Microwave News as "an influential newsletter devoted entirely to the EMF-health issue" (Page 141) but cited the American Physical Society, stating "Paul Brodeur and Microwave News in particular, had given the public a seriously distorted view of the scientific facts." (Page 158)
