= Voodoo Science =

2000 book by Robert L. Park

Voodoo Science: The Road from Foolishness to Fraud
- Cover of the first edition
- Authors: Robert L. Park
- Language: English
- Subjects: Science, Pseudoscience
- Published: 2000
- Publisher: Oxford University Press
- Publication place: UK & USA
- Media type: Print (Hardcover and Paperback)
- Pages: 230
- ISBN: 0-19-860443-2
- Text: Voodoo Science: The Road from Foolishness to Fraud online

Voodoo Science: The Road from Foolishness to Fraud is a book published in 2000 by physics professor Robert L. Park, critical of research that falls short of adhering to the scientific method. Other people have used the term "voodoo science", but amongst academics it is most closely associated with Park. The book is critical of, among other things, homeopathy, cold fusion and the International Space Station.

== Categories ==
Park uses the term voodoo science (see the quote section below, Page 10) as covering four categories which evolve from self-delusion to fraud:

- pathological science, wherein genuine scientists deceive themselves
- junk science, speculative theorizing which bamboozles rather than enlightens
- pseudoscience proper, work falsely claiming to have a scientific basis, which may be dependent on supernatural explanations
- fraudulent science, exploiting bad science for the purposes of fraud

Park criticizes junk science as the creature of "scientists, many of whom have impressive credentials, who craft arguments deliberately intended to deceive or confuse."

== Examples cited ==
- Perpetual motion, free energy suppression and fringe physics claims
  - Robert Fludd
  - Garabed T. K. Giragossian
  - The Energy Machine of Joseph Newman
  - Better World Technologies (Dennis Lee)
  - Blacklight Power, formerly HydroCatalysis (Randell Mills)
  - Cold fusion (Stanley Pons and Martin Fleischmann)
  - Patterson Power Cell (James Patterson)
  - Gravitational shielding (Eugene Podkletnov)
- Human spaceflight (in terms of actual importance to science since the rise of robotic spacecraft)
  - International Space Station (for claims of necessity to conduct scientific research)
  - Gerard K. O'Neill, L5 Society and space colonization
  - Robert Zubrin, Mars Society, Biosphere 2 and a human mission to Mars
- Voodoo science protected by government secrecy
  - Project Mogul and the Roswell UFO incident resulting in a loss of public trust, as well as the later alien autopsy video hoax
  - Edward Teller and Lowell Wood's work on the Strategic Defense Initiative (especially regarding the X-ray laser, but also "Brilliant Pebbles")
  - Great Oil Sniffer Hoax
- Superstitions and pseudoscience
  - Mars effect (astrology) claimed by Michel Gauquelin
  - Parapsychology (e.g. Robert G. Jahn and Dean Radin)
- Placebos and alternative medicine
  - Vitamin O
  - Homeopathy
    - water memory (proposed by Jacques Benveniste)
  - Animal magnetism
  - Magnet therapy
  - Therapeutic touch (debunked by Emily Rosa at age nine)
- Other health claims
  - Maharishi Effect (using Transcendental Meditation (TM) to effect a decrease in societal violence; the spike in murders during the 1993 Washington D.C. study is specifically mentioned)
  - Deepak Chopra (who makes claims linking Ayurveda (traditional medicine native to India) with quantum mechanics)
  - Electromagnetic radiation and health (especially related to power lines and cancer risk)
    - "Paul Brodeur and Microwave News in particular, had given the public a seriously distorted view of the scientific facts." (Page 158)
- Contributing factors
  - Mainstream media reporting voodoo science uncritically as infotainment
  - Abolition of the Office of Technology Assessment
  - Establishment of the National Center for Complementary and Alternative Medicine

Park also discusses the Daubert standard for excluding junk science from litigation.

== Warning signs ==
Drawing on examples used in Voodoo Science, Park outlined seven warning signs that a claim may be pseudoscientific in a 2003 article for The Chronicle of Higher Education:

1. Discoverers make their claims directly to the popular media, rather than to fellow scientists.
2. Discoverers claim that a conspiracy has tried to suppress the discovery.
3. The claimed effect appears so weak that observers can hardly distinguish it from noise. No amount of further work increases the signal.
4. Anecdotal evidence is used to back up the claim.
5. True believers cite ancient traditions in support of the new claim.
6. The discoverer or discoverers work in isolation from the mainstream scientific community.
7. The discovery, if true, would require a change in the understanding of the fundamental laws of nature.

== Reception ==
Matt Nisbet in the Skeptical Inquirer noted that the reaction to Voodoo Science has been mostly favorable.

Bob Goldstein in a book review for Nature Cell Biology described Park as an equivalent to Richard Dawkins and Stephen Jay Gould, scientific writers who have "talent for defending a view of the world that is perfectly rational and free of witchcraft and superstition."

American chemist Nicholas Turro wrote "the book is entertaining and provocative reading... Whether or not you agree with Park's take on voodoo science, a message of the book is that if scientists do not take a more significant role in the way that science is disseminated to the public and especially to politicians, voodoo science will continue to survive."

The mathematician Malcolm Sherman in the American Scientist gave the book a positive review stating "Park does more than analyze and expose various kinds of bad ("voodoo") science. He demonstrates how valid science is distorted or ignored by the media and by those (including scientists) seeking to influence public policy." The physicist Kenneth R. Foster also positively reviewed the book concluding "Park is an articulate and skeptical voice of reason about science."

Reviewing the book for The New York Times, Ed Regis compared it positively to the 1957 book by Martin Gardner, Fads and Fallacies in the Name of Science, calling Voodoo Science a "worthy successor" and praising it for explaining why various purportedly scientific claims were in fact impossible. Science writer Kendrick Frazier wrote "Robert Park has brought us a book that has a freshness and originality—and an importance and potential for influence—perhaps not seen since Gardner’s first."

Robin McKie for The Observer described it as "an admirable analysis: wittily written, vivid and put together without a hint of malice."

Rachel Hay in a review wrote that Park had "debunked expertly" pseudoscience topics such as homeopathy, cold fusion and perpetual motion machines but the book is not easily accessible to students. However, S. Elizabeth Bird an anthropology professor recommended it for "students who need to establish a grasp of the scientific method."

Bruce Lewenstein wrote a critical review claiming Park had lumped together pathological science, junk science, pseudoscience and fraud all together as voodoo science but this is problematic as "each category alone is fraught with definitional, historical, and analytical difficulties." Brian Josephson wrote that the book, while giving "the official story regarding a number of 'mistaken beliefs' ", did not provide "the additional information that might lead one to conclude that the official view does not tell the whole story."

== See also ==
- Antiscience
- Cargo cult science
- Denialism
- Politicization of science
- Scientific misconduct
- Scientific skepticism
- List of books about the politics of science
- List of cognitive biases
- List of experimental errors and frauds in physics
- List of topics characterized as pseudoscience
- Quackery

=== Debunking ===
- 10^{23} Campaign
- Flim-Flam!
- Frye standard
