= Tibor Rode =

Tibor Rode (born 1974 in Hamburg) is a German lawyer and novelist. He focuses on science and technology-based thrillers, frequently with Climate fiction themes such as the consequences of global warming as well as modern technologies such as artificial intelligence.

== Life ==
Tibor Rode was born in Hamburg in 1974 and studied law there. He completed his legal training at major international law firms including CMS and White & Case. After passing his second state examination, he initially headed the legal department of the Hamburger Morgenpost newspaper and then joined the major international law firm Taylor Wessing as a lawyer. He lives in Pinneberg and is a managing partner at the law firm Poppe, which he joined in 2015. He focuses on German company law and trade law and is a specialist lawyer for IT law. He has also been working as a notary since 2018.

In 2013, Rode published his first book, Das Rad der Ewigkeit (The Wheel of Eternity), in which a patent attorney and a book restorer pursue a code in an ancient manuscript that is linked to the dream of “eternal energy” and the legend surrounding Orffyreus' Perpetuum mobile. Subsequently, further books were published by Bastei Lübbe, including 2016's Das Mona-Lisa-Virus (The Mona Lisa Virus) about a computer virus that manipulates images worldwide. In the book CO_{2} - Welt ohne Morgen (CO2 - World Without Tomorrow) from 2019, written under the pseudonym Tom Roth, Rode addresses "climate terrorism" and the question of how far climate protection should go. The book Der Wald (The Forest) was first published in 2023 by Droemer and made it onto Spiegel's bestseller list. The eco-thriller deals with anonymous seed shipments and the spread of novel invasive plants that bring disease and death around the world. Droemer followed this in 2024 with Lupus – Alles Böse kehrt zurück (Lupus – All Evil Returns) about a spate of wolf attacks on humans and in 2025 with Animal. Sprich oder stirb. (Animal. Speak or Die), in which a pig sues an agricultural corporation with the help of speech decryption using artificial intelligence.

== Works ==
=== Novels ===
- Das Rad der Ewigkeit. Bastei Lübbe, 2013, ISBN 978-3-7857-2468-2.
- Das Los. Bastei Lübbe, 2014, ISBN 978-3-431-03893-4.
- Das Mona-Lisa-Virus. Bastei Lübbe, 2016, ISBN 978-3-7857-2567-2.
- The Message. beTHRILLED, 2017, ISBN 978-3-7325-3290-2 (E-Book)
- Das Morpheus-Gen Bastei Lübbe, 2018, ISBN 978-3-431-04086-9.
- CO_{2} – Welt ohne Morgen. Bastei Lübbe, 2020, ISBN 978-3-7857-2706-5 (erschienen unter dem Pseudonym Tom Roth).
- Der Wald: Er tötet leise. Droemer, 2023, ISBN 978-3-426-28400-1.
- Lupus – Alles Böse kehrt zurück. Droemer, 2024, ISBN 978-3-426-28401-8.
- Animal. Sprich oder stirb. Droemer, 2025, ISBN 978-3-426-56265-9.
