= Magnet motor =

Perpetual motion machine

A magnet motor or magnetic motor is a type of perpetual motion machine, which is intended to generate a rotation by means of permanent magnets in stator and rotor without external energy supply. Such a motor is theoretically as well as practically not realizable. The idea of functioning magnetic motors has been promoted by various hobbyists. It can be regarded as pseudoscience. There are frequent references to free energy and sometimes even links to esotericism.

Magnet motors are not to be confused with the commonly used permanent magnet motors, which are powered from an external electrical energy supply.

== Working principle ==
Example of a magnet motor design. The predominantly attracting orientation of the magnets apparently leads to a perpetual rotary motion.

A hypothetical magnet motor works with permanent magnets in stator and rotor. By a special arrangement of the attracting and repelling poles, a rotational movement of the rotor is supposedly permanently maintained. Practical implementations fail because there is no substantial energy in magnets that could be employed for propulsion or to compensate for energy losses. The force between permanent magnets is conservative as the magnetic field follows a potential, so that there is no work done over a closed cycle. After a short amount of time, such a motor will stop moving and assume an equilibrium position.

Rationalizations of proponents about the nature of the energy source vary. Some argue with magnetic force only, leaving questions of conservation of energy aside. Some argue that permanent magnets contain stored magnetic energy, which will be consumed by the motor. Such energy that exists is limited to the energy spent during the production of the magnet, which is rather small. Also, this would lead to a rapid reduction of the magnetization over time, which is not observed. Other rationalizations include references to so-called free energy and zero-point energy, without explaining how these energies are liberated. Others claim that their motors could possibly convert heat energy from the environment to mechanical motion (perpetual motion machine of the second kind).

== History ==
First ideas of a magnetic motor were put forward by Petrus Peregrinus de Maricourt in 1269, who imagined a toothed wheel that is continually moving by the force of magnets. A popular example of a magnet motor, although without rotating axis, was put forward by John Wilkins in 1670: A ramp with a magnet at the top, which pulled a metal ball up the ramp. Near the magnet was a small hole that was supposed to allow the ball to drop under the ramp and return to the bottom, where a flap allowed it to return to the top again. This device was later called the “Simple Magnetic Overunity Toy”. The complete theory of electromagnetism was only formulated by James Clerk Maxwell in 1865, and has been found valid up until today.

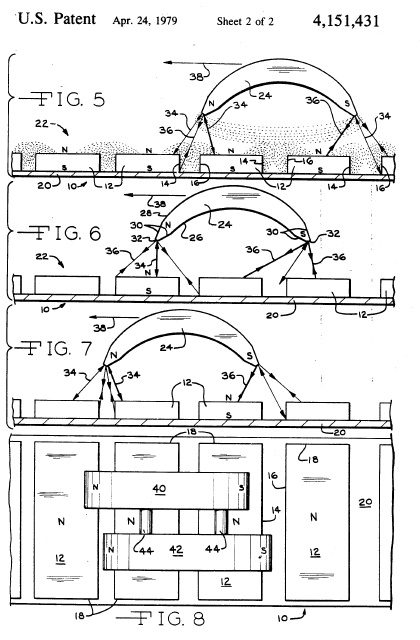
Patent sketch of Howard Johnson's magnet motor

Since the middle of the 20th century, a number of inventors claimed to have constructed various magnet motors. In 1954, German mechanical engineer Friedrich Lüling claimed to have realized a motor which could run with its permanent magnets for 10 to 20 years without interruption. On 8 February 1966, the UFA-Wochenschau reported on the invention. American engineer Howard Johnson filed the U.S. patent 4,151,431 on a permanent magnet motor in 1973, which was granted in 1979. A prototype of his motor was presented in 1980 in the popular scientific Science & Mechanics Magazine. Further magnet motors were designed by the Japanese entertainer Kohei Minato, who applied for patents in 1988, 1997 and 2005.

The European Patent Office has not recognized a patent application for a magnet motor. Starting in 2006, “inventor” Mike Brady and his company Perendev-Group marketed such a motor and was charged with serious fraud in 2010 and sentenced to 5 years and 9 months imprisonment.

In para-scientific circles, the magnet motor is still propagated and construction manuals are still distributed despite the lacking proof of function. In the beginning of the 21st century, the idea of a magnet motor has been increasingly propagated on the internet and a number of fake videos showing pretended running magnet motors have appeared on online video-sharing platforms. Addressing the question, why the magnet motor is still not adopted by the industry, despite its supposedly great potential, conspiracy theories are put forward: Magnet motors would provide free energy for everyone, harm the existing energy industry, and would thus be suppressed.
