= Steorn =

Irish energy company

Steorn Ltd.
- Type: Private Limited
- Industry: Energy technology
- Founded: 2000
- Defunct: 2016
- Fate: Liquidated
- Headquarters: Docklands Innovation Park, East Wall Road, Dublin 3, Ireland
- Products: Charging and power systems, cellular telephones, research and development
- Revenue: €1,000 (2005)
- Net income: € -1,794,648 (2005)
- Number of employees: 18
- Website: www.steorn.com Archive link as of March 2015

Steorn Ltd (/ˈstjɔːrn/) was a small, private technology development company based in Dublin, Ireland. In August 2006, it announced that it had developed a technology to provide "free, clean, and constant energy" via an apparent perpetual motion machine, something which is contrary to the law of conservation of energy, a fundamental principle of physics.

Steorn challenged the scientific community to investigate its claim and, in December 2006, said that it had chosen a jury of scientists to do so. In June 2009 the jury gave its unanimous verdict that Steorn had not demonstrated the production of energy.

Steorn gave two public demonstrations of its technology. In the first demonstration, in July 2007 at the Kinetica Museum in London, the device failed to work. The second demonstration, which ran from December 2009 to February 2010 at the Waterways Visitor Centre in Dublin, involved a motor powered by a battery and provided no independent evidence that excess energy was being generated. It was dismissed by the press as an attempt to build a perpetual motion machine, and a publicity stunt.

In November 2016, the company laid off its staff, closed its facility, and prepared for liquidation. It was finally liquidated in May 2024.

== History ==
Steorn was founded in 2000 and, in October 2001, its website stated that it was a "specialist service company providing programme management and technical assessment advice for European companies engaging in e-commerce projects". Steorn is a Norse word meaning to guide or manage.

In May 2006, The Sunday Business Post reported that Steorn was a former dot-com company which was developing a microgenerator product based on the same principle as self-winding watches, as well as creating e-commerce websites for customers. The company had also recently raised about €2.5 million from investors and was three years into a four-year development plan for its microgenerator technology. Steorn later stated that the account given in this interview was intended to prevent a leak regarding their free energy technology.

The company's investment history shows several share allotments for cash between August 2000 and October 2005, the investments totalling €3 million. In 2006, Steorn secured €8.1 million in loans from a range of investors in order to continue its research, and these funds were also converted into shares. Steorn said that it would seek no further funding while attempting to prove its free-energy claim in order to demonstrate its genuine desire for validation.

=== Liquidation ===
In June 2016, the company informed shareholders that it had failed to meet expectations, that company founder Shaun (Seán) McCarthy was being replaced as CEO, and that operating costs were nearly €1 million per year. After investments totaling nearly €23 million over a ten-year period, in November 2016 the company shut down and laid off its staff, due to a lack of additional funding to continue operations.

The liquidator, from Deloitte, finished the liquidation process in May 2024, with €344,000 owed to creditors and only €80,000 in assets.

== Free energy claim ==
In August 2006, Steorn placed an advertisement in The Economist saying that it had developed a technology that produced "free, clean and constant energy". Called Orbo, the technology was said to violate conservation of energy but had allegedly been validated by eight independent scientists. Steorn claimed none of these scientists would talk to the media, and suggested that this was because they did not want to become embroiled in a controversy.

=== Views on the technology ===
No specific details of the workings of the claimed technology were made public. McCarthy stated in a 2006 RTÉ radio interview, "What we have developed is a way to construct magnetic fields so that when you travel round the magnetic fields, starting and stopping at the same position, you have gained energy". In 2011, Steorn's website was updated to suggest that the Orbo is based on magnetic fields which vary over time. Barry Williams of the Australian Skeptics has pointed out that Steorn is "not the first company to claim they have suddenly discovered the miraculous property of magnetism that allows you to get free energy" while Martin Fleischmann says that it is not credible that positioning of magnetic fields could create energy.

Following a meeting between McCarthy and Professor Sir Eric Ash in July 2007, Ash reported that "the Orbo is a mechanical device which uses powerful magnets on the rim of a rotor and further magnets on an outer shell." During this meeting, McCarthy referred to the law of conservation of energy as scientific dogma. However, conservation of energy is a fundamental principle of physics, more specifically a consequence of the unchanging nature of physical laws with time by Noether's Theorem. Ash said that there was no comparison with religious dogma since there is no flexibility in choosing to accept that energy is always conserved. Rejecting conservation of energy would undermine all science and technology. Ash also formed the opinion that McCarthy was truly convinced in the validity of his invention but that this conviction was a case of "prolonged self-deception."

Many people have accused Steorn of engaging in a publicity stunt although Steorn denied such accusations. Eric Berger, writing on the Houston Chronicle website, commented: "Steorn is a former e-business company that saw its market vanish during the dot.com bust. It stands to reason that Steorn has retooled as a Web marketing company and is using the 'free energy' promotion as a platform to show future clients how it can leverage print advertising and a slick Web site to promote their products and ideas". Thomas Ricker at Engadget suggested that Steorn's free-energy claim was a ruse to improve brand recognition and to help them sell Hall probes, while Josh Catone, features editor for Mashable, believes that it was merely an elaborate hoax.

=== Jury process ===
In its advertisement in The Economist, Steorn challenged scientists to form an independent jury to test its technology and publish the results. Within 36 hours of the advertisement being published, 420 scientists contacted Steorn and, on 1 December 2006, Steorn announced it had selected a jury. It was headed by Ian MacDonald, emeritus professor of electrical engineering at the University of Alberta, and the process began in February 2007.

In June 2009 the jury announced its unanimous verdict that "Steorn's attempts to demonstrate the claim have not shown the production of energy. The jury is therefore ceasing work". Dick Ahlstrom, writing in the Irish Times, concluded from this that Steorn's technology did not work. Steorn responded by saying that because of difficulties in implementing the technology the focus of the process had been on providing the jury with test data on magnetic effects for study. Steorn also said that these difficulties had been resolved and disputed its jury's findings.

=== Demonstrations ===
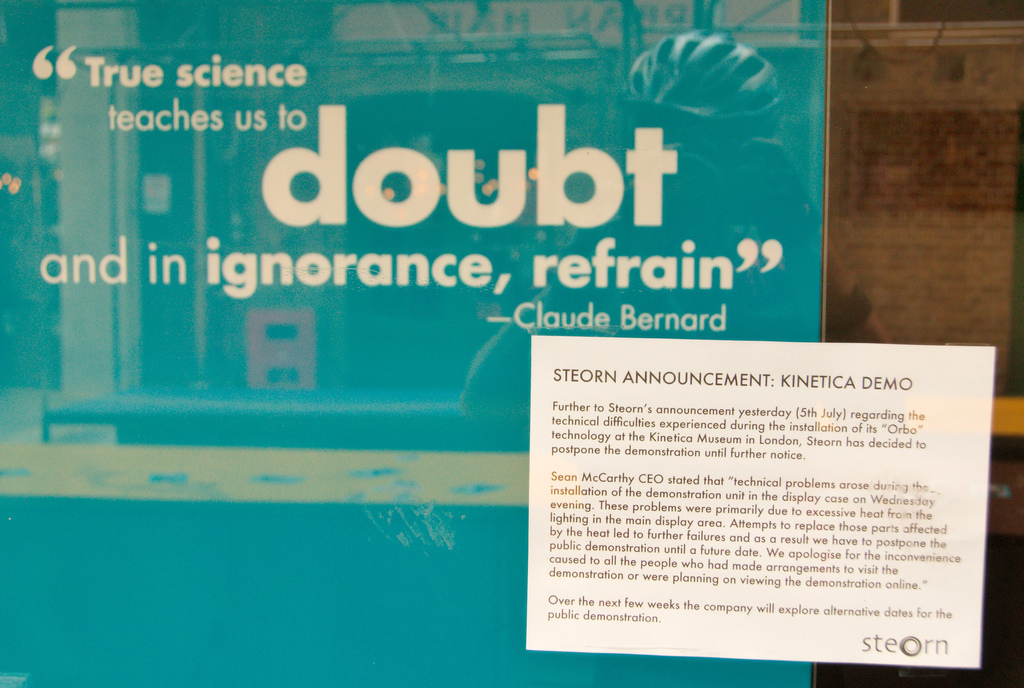
A notice at the Kinetica Museum announcing the cancellation of the public demonstration

On 4 July 2007, the technology was to be displayed at the Kinetica Museum, Spitalfields Market, London. A unit constructed of clear plastic was prepared so that the arrangement of magnets could be seen and to demonstrate that the device operated without external power sources. The public demonstration was delayed and then cancelled because of technical difficulties. Steorn initially said that the problems had been caused by excessive heat from the lighting.

A second demonstration ran between 15 December 2009 and February 2010 at the Waterways Visitor Centre in Dublin, and was streamed via Steorn's website. The demonstration was of a device powered by a rechargeable battery. Steorn said that the device produced more energy than it consumed and recharged the battery. No substantive details of the technology were revealed and no independent evidence of Steorn's claim was provided.

On 1 April 2010 Steorn opened an online development community, called the Steorn Knowledge Development Base (SKDB), which it said would explain its technology. Access was available only under licence on payment of a fee.

In May 2015, Steorn put an "Orbo PowerCube" on display behind the bar of a pub in Dublin. The PowerCube was a small box which the pub website claimed contained a "perpetual motion motor" which required no external power source. The cube was shown charging a mobile phone. Steorn claimed to be performing some "basic field trials" in undisclosed locations.

=== Orbo phone charger ===
Beginning in December 2015, Steorn began accepting orders for two products, including a phone charger, through email only. The announcement was posted only to a Facebook page titled "Orbo" and a Steorn YouTube channel. In early December, McCarthy said that he was waiting for the first shipment of the two products, the Orbo Phone and the Orbo Cube, from a manufacturer in China. Steorn described the Orbo Cube as a showcase for the technology rather than a mass-market product, with the Cube retailing at €1,200.

== See also ==
- Pseudoscience
- History of perpetual motion machines
