= Garabed T. K. Giragossian =

Armenian-born American inventor (19th–20th century)

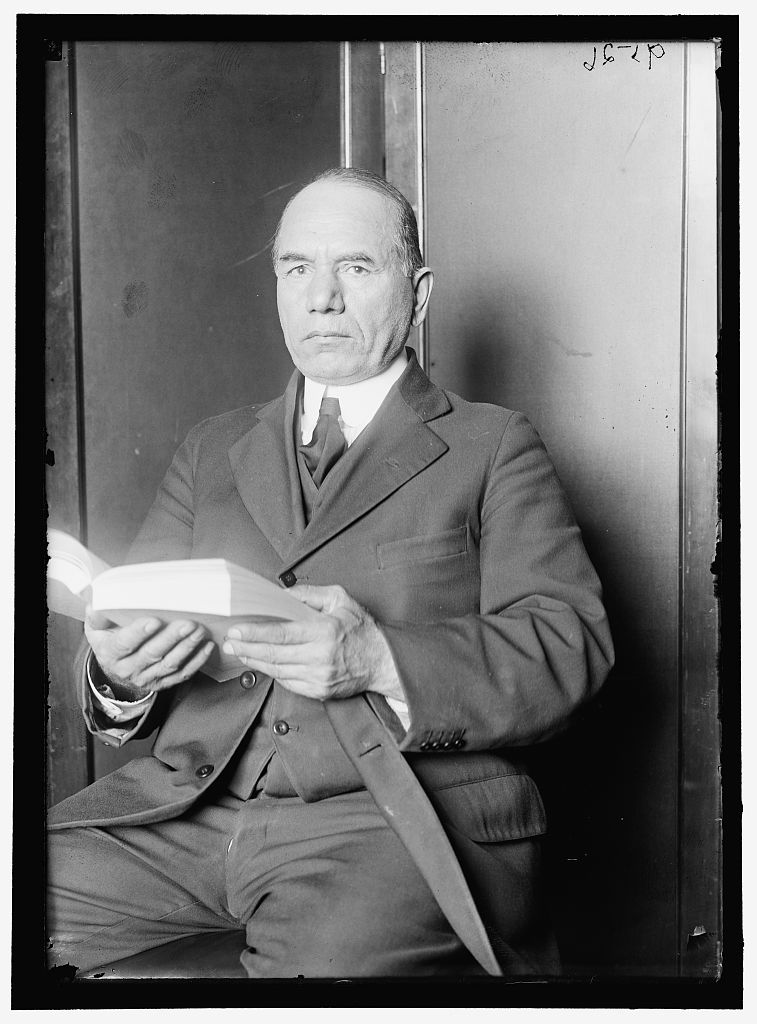

Garabed T. K. Giragossian was an Armenian living in Boston who is remembered for developing a perpetual motion device shortly after the turn of the 20th century. He immigrated to America in 1891. In 1917, Giragossian claimed, reportedly fraudulently, to have developed a "free energy machine". The assignment of the patent to the United States government was conditionally accepted in Pub. Res. 65-21, 40 Stat. 435, enacted on February 8, 1918, and authorized the Secretary of the Interior to form a scientific committee to investigate the machine. The committee issued a report on July 1, 1918 finding that the principles were not sound. According to an editorial in the Scientific American in 1918, Giragossian claimed that the machine, named Garabed, took energy out of the cosmos and turned it into mechanical motion.

Editors of the Journal of the American Medical Association compared him and his methods with quacks in the medical world; they pointed out that he could not answer the question what qualifications he had to undertake his work, and that he repeatedly only replied, he was an honest man and that he could prove it with signatures of friends and sponsors. They deplored the waste of time of "scientific men in investigating alleged discoveries by men who are utterly lacking in the fundamental qualifications needed [...]."

Supposedly involved in a conspiracy, Woodrow Wilson signed a resolution offering him protection. The device was a giant flywheel that was charged up with energy slowly and put out a lot of energy for just a second.

== See also ==
- Voodoo Science, a book in which he is mentioned.
