= Josef Papp =

Canadian engineer

Josef Papp (c. 1933 – April 1989) was an American engineer who was awarded U.S. patents related to the development of an engine, and also claimed to have invented a jet submarine. He was born in Tatabánya, Hungary, and died in Daytona Beach, Florida.

== History ==
Papp was issued several U.S. patents for these inventions, including his noble gas fuel mixture.

The engine continues to be considered by many scientists as a hoax. Papp's poor physics theoretic background is demonstrated in the abstracts of the patents, which had been criticized by Richard Feynman. Supposedly — no confirmation has been found in contemporary sources and — Papp presented to an audience, including Feynman, an ill-fated demonstration in 1966, in which his engine exploded, killing one man (never identified in later accounts) and seriously injuring two others. Feynman is said to have written an article for "LASER, Journal of the Southern Californian Skeptics" (reproduced in text form by the Museum of Hoaxes) asserting that Papp was a fraudster and the explosion an attempt by Papp to avoid discovery, although he notes that Caltech settled with Papp out of court.

== See also ==
- List of hoaxes
- History of perpetual motion machines#1951 to 1980
