= Patterson power cell =

Supposed energy device

The Patterson power cell is a cold fusion device invented by chemist James A. Patterson, which he claimed created 200 times more energy than it used. Patterson claimed the device neutralized radioactivity without emitting any harmful radiation. Cold fusion was the subject of an intense scientific controversy in 1989, before being discredited in the eyes of mainstream science. Physicist Robert L. Park describes the device as fringe science in his book Voodoo Science.

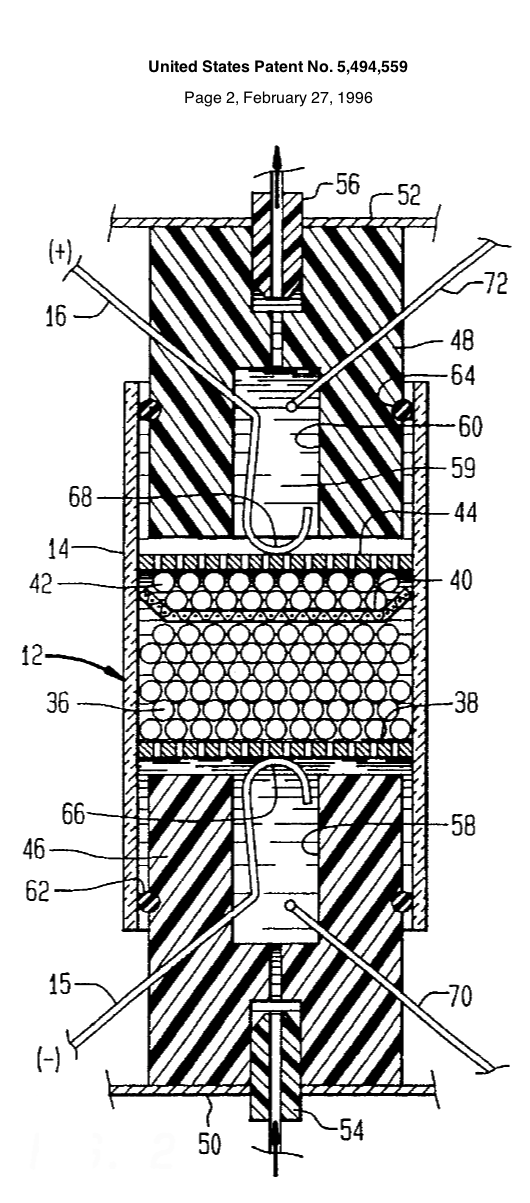
Drawing of the cell.

== Company formed ==
In 1995, Clean Energy Technologies Inc. was formed to produce and promote the power cell.

== Claims and observations ==
Patterson variously said it produced a hundred or two hundred times more power than it used. Representatives promoting the device at the Power-Gen '95 Conference said that an input of 1 watt would generate more than 1,000 watts of excess heat (waste heat). This supposedly happened as hydrogen or deuterium nuclei fuse together to produce heat through a form of low energy nuclear reaction. The by-products of nuclear fusion, e.g. a tritium nucleus and a proton or an ^{3}He nucleus and a neutron, were not detected in any reliable way, leading experts to think that no such fusion was taking place.

It was further claimed that if radioactive isotopes such as uranium were present, the cell enables the hydrogen nuclei to fuse with these isotopes, transforming them into stable elements and thus neutralizing the radioactivity. It was claimed that the transformation would be achieved without releasing any radiation to the environment and without expending any energy. A televised demonstration on June 11, 1997, on Good Morning America provided no proof for the claims. As at 2002, the neutralization of radioactive isotopes has only been achieved through intense neutron bombardment in a nuclear reactor or large scale high energy particle accelerator, and at a large expense of energy.

Patterson has carefully distanced himself from the work of Fleischmann and Pons and from the label of "cold fusion", due to the negative connotations associated to them since 1989. Ultimately, this effort was unsuccessful, and not only did it inherit the label of pathological science, but it managed to make cold fusion look a little more pathological in the public eye. Some cold fusion proponents view the cell as a confirmation of their work, while critics see it as "the fringe of the fringe of cold fusion research", since it attempts to commercialize cold fusion on top of making bad science.

In 2002, John R. Huizenga, professor of nuclear chemistry at the University of Rochester, who was head of a government panel convened in 1989 to investigate the cold fusion claims of Fleischmann and Pons, and who wrote a book about the controversy, said "I would be willing to bet there's nothing to it", when asked about the Patterson Power Cell.

== Replications ==
George H. Miley is a professor of nuclear engineering and a cold fusion researcher who claims to have replicated the Patterson power cell. During the 2011 World Green Energy Symposium, Miley stated that his device continuously produces several hundred watts of power. Earlier results by Miley have not convinced researchers.

On Good Morning America, Quintin Bowles, professor of mechanical engineering at the University of Missouri–Kansas City, claimed in 1996 to have successfully replicated the Patterson power cell. In the book Voodoo Science, Bowles is quoted as having stated: "It works, we just don't know how it works."

A replication has been attempted at Earthtech, using a CETI supplied kit. They were not able to replicate the excess heat.
