= Charles Redheffer =

American inventor who claimed to have invented a perpetual motion machine

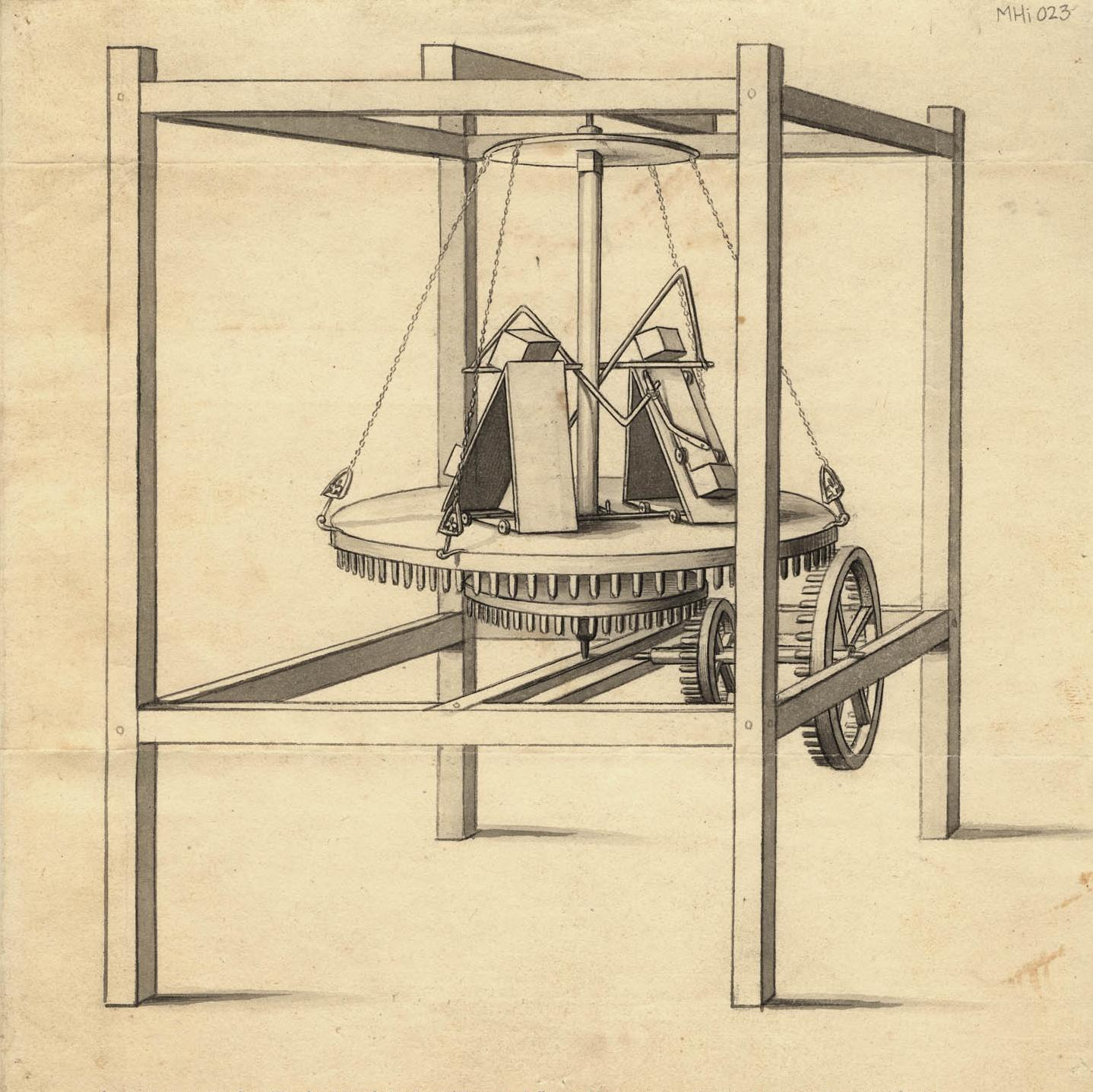
A diagram of Redheffer's first machine

Charles Redheffer was an American inventor who claimed to have invented a perpetual motion machine.

First appearing in Philadelphia, Redheffer exhibited his machine to the public, charging high prices for viewing. When he applied to the government for more money, a group of inspectors were sent to examine the machine. It was discovered the machine was actually powered by a device Redheffer claimed was powered by the machine.

Redheffer moved to New York City and set up a similar scam after rebuilding his machine. However, an engineer detected that it was a fake by listening to its unsteady motions at an exhibition. He discovered that the machine was operated by a man using a crank in a room on the floor above. Redheffer returned to Philadelphia. He later claimed to have created another machine, but refused to demonstrate it to anyone. He managed to get a patent for his machine in 1820, but after this his fate is unknown.

== Personal life ==
Little has been recorded about Redheffer's life, other than his connection to the hoax. According to one source, he was from Germantown in Philadelphia, but most sources simply state that he appeared in Philadelphia with his machine. Redheffer disappeared from public view after the discovery of the fraud, and his fate is unknown.

== Appearance in Philadelphia ==
Charles Redheffer and his machine became well known in Philadelphia in 1812. Redheffer claimed he had invented a perpetual motion machine and exhibited it in a house near the Schuylkill River in the outskirts of the city. He charged an admission fee of $5 (some sources claim $1) for men to view it; depending on the source, women were admitted free or at a charge of $1. The machine caused a sensation, and Redheffer lobbied for funds to build a larger version.

On January 21, 1813, eight city commissioners visited Redheffer to inspect the machine. They had to do so through a barred window, as Redheffer was concerned anyone going near the machine might damage it. One of the inspectors, Nathan Sellers, was accompanied by his son Coleman, who noticed something odd about the gears. The machine itself was said to be powering a separate device through a series of gears and weights. Coleman noticed that the cogs were worn on the wrong side and suggested that the device was in fact powering the machine.

The elder Sellers was convinced the machine was a hoax. To validate his suspicions, he hired local engineer Isaiah Lukens to build a similar machine, using a hidden clockwork motor as a power source. They then arranged a demonstration of the machine to Redheffer, who was immediately convinced and offered to buy it. Meanwhile, Redheffer's machine appeared in the Philadelphia Gazette. Civil engineer Charles Gobort offered to bet sums of money ranging from $6,000 to $10,000 that the machine was genuine, and that Redheffer had discovered perpetual motion.

== Move to New York City ==
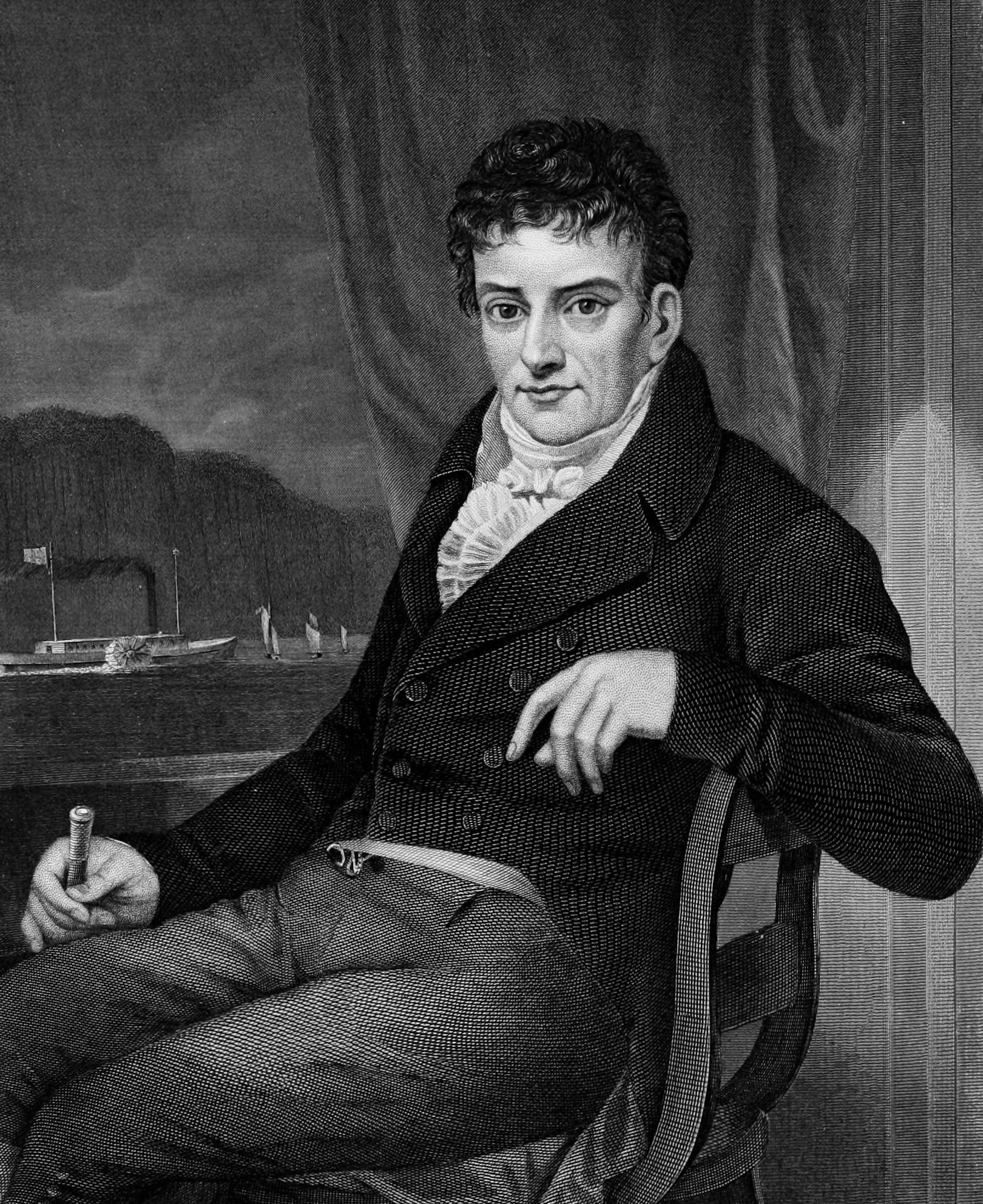
Robert Fulton, who discovered that the machine exhibited in New York City was a fraud

His ruse revealed, Redheffer immediately departed for New York City where he was still unknown. He changed his machine somewhat so that it could not be detected as easily, and he exhibited it as he had done in Philadelphia.

When mechanical engineer Robert Fulton went to see the machine, he noticed that the machine was unsteady as if someone were driving it manually and irregularly with a crank. Fulton also detected that the sound was uneven, uncharacteristic of a machine's motions. He announced the machine was a fraud, and challenged Redheffer exclaiming he would expose the secret power source, otherwise he would pay for all the damage he would cause. Redheffer agreed, so Fulton removed some boards from the wall alongside the machine and exposed a catgut cord that led to the upper floor. Upstairs he found an old man who was turning a hand-crank with one hand and eating bread with the other. Spectators realized they had been duped and destroyed the machine; Redheffer fled the city.

== Later appearances ==
Redheffer appears to have constructed another machine in 1816, which he stated his intention to demonstrate to a group of men including the mayor and chief justice of Philadelphia. However, despite several meetings, Redheffer refused to demonstrate the machine to them.

On July 11, 1820, the U.S. Patent Office granted a patent to Charles Redheffer (or Charles Redheiffer) for a device listed as "machinery for the purpose of gaining power". (All patents up to 1836 were lost in the 1836 U.S. Patent Office fire. If recovered, it would be X-Patent X3,215.)
