= Joseph Westley Newman =

American inventor and author (1936–2015)

- Born: Joseph Westley Newman; July 2, 1936; Mobile, Alabama, US
- Died: March 6, 2015 (aged 78); Denton, Texas, U.S.
- Education: University of Alabama
- Occupations: Inventor, author
- Children: Donna Newman; Michelle Newman; Gyromas Newman

Notes
- Author of the book The Energy Machine of Joseph Newman

Joseph Westley Newman (July 2, 1936 – March 6, 2015) was an American inventor and author who developed an "energy machine" which he attempted to patent, but was rejected by the US Patent and Trademark Office on grounds of being a perpetual motion machine. He described this machine in a book, The Energy Machine of Joseph Newman. Newman alleged that he had a mechanical explanation for Albert Einstein's unified field theory of physics. After applying for patents on the perpetual motion motor, he battled for over seven years against what he claimed was a government conspiracy to suppress his supposed discoveries, garnering national attention as a result. Further testing revealed that the machine did not operate at 100% efficiency, nor did it produce more energy than it used, as Newman claimed.

== Early life ==
After Newman graduated from Baker High School in Mobile, Alabama, he joined the U.S. Air Force in 1955 to serve as an expediter, and was stationed at Ramey Air Force Base in Puerto Rico where he witnessed Hurricane Betsy devastate the island in 1956. The aftermath of the hurricane prompted Newman to make a pledge to God that he would devote the rest of his life to help humanity.

After leaving the Air Force a year early on the G.I. Bill, Newman attended the University of Alabama, enrolling in economics and accounting courses. He left college after acquiring interest in inventing and not long after, was awarded patents for the first plastic barbells. After selling his barbell business, he was able to buy science books and began to study energy, electrical engineering, physics and electromagnetics.

== Career controversies ==
Joseph Newman applied for a patent on his "energy machine" in 1979, which was rejected by the US Patent and Trademark Office as a perpetual motion machine. From 1979 to 1986 he filed lawsuits against the patent office to force the award of his patent.

The Federal District Court ordered the machine turned over to the National Bureau of Standards for testing, conceding that "It's very unusual for us to be testing something for a patent." Matthew Heyman, a bureau spokesman, said, "I'm not aware of us ever having been involved in a patent case before."

Newman persuaded seven members of Congress to sponsor private bills on his behalf that would order the Patent Office to grant him a patent.

The NBS concluded that Newman's machine did not reach or exceed 100% efficiency as Newman claimed, and declared the patent nonrewardable.

== Later life ==
In 1987 he announced a run for the American Presidency, claiming that God had instructed him to run in order that the extinction of humanity by 1999 might be averted, and that Nostradamus had predicted his existence. In 1989 Newman claimed, while already married, to have married his secretary and her 8-year-old daughter, acting on orders from God. The daughter was removed from his home by the authorities.

== Documentary ==
Jon Fox directed a 2015 documentary film about Newman, entitled "Newman". It provides background on Newman's childhood, his struggles to obtain a patent, and interviews with Newman in 2014, shortly before his death.
