= Five Equations That Changed the World =

1995 book by Michael Guillen

- First edition
- Author: Michael Guillen
- Genre: Popular science
- Published: 1995
- Publisher: Hyperion Books
- Pages: 288
- ISBN: 0786861037

Five Equations That Changed the World: The Power and Poetry of Mathematics is a book by Michael Guillen, published in 1995. It is divided into five chapters that talk about five different equations in physics and the people who have developed them

The book is a light study in science and history, portraying the preludes to and times and settings of discoveries that have been the basis of further development, including space travel, flight and nuclear power. Each chapter of the book is divided into sections titled Veni, Vidi, Vici.

The reviews of the book have been mixed. Publishers Weekly called it "wholly accessible, beautifully written", Kirkus Reviews wrote that it is a "crowd-pleasing kind of book designed to make the science as palatable as possible", and Frank Mahnke wrote that Guillen "has a nice touch for the history of mathematics and physics and their impact on the world". However, in contrast, Charles Stephens panned "the superficiality of the author's treatment of scientific ideas", and the editors of The Capital Times called the book a "miserable failure" at its goal of helping the public appreciate the beauty of mathematics.

== Equations ==
The scientists and their equations are:

1. Isaac Newton and the law of universal gravity: $F=G\times M\times m \div d^2$
2. Daniel Bernoulli and the law of hydrodynamic pressure: $P+\rho \times \tfrac12 v^2=\text{CONSTANT}$
3. Michael Faraday and the law of electromagnetic induction: $\nabla \times \mathbf E=-\partial \mathbf B/\partial t$
4. Rudolf Clausius and the second law of thermodynamics: $\Delta S_{\text{universe}}> 0$
5. Albert Einstein and the theory of special relativity: $E=m\times c^2$
