= Johann Bessler =

German inventor

Johann Bessler (Orffyreus)

Johann Ernst Elias Bessler (ca. 1680 – 30 November 1745), known as Orffyreus or Orffyré, was a German entrepreneur who claimed to have built several perpetual motion machines. Those claims generated considerable interest and controversy among some of the leading natural philosophers of the day, including Gottfried Wilhelm Leibniz, Johann Bernoulli, John Theophilus Desaguliers, and Willem 's Gravesande. The modern scientific consensus is that Bessler perpetrated a deliberate fraud, although the details of this have not been satisfactorily explained.

== Life and career ==
Bessler was born to a peasant family in Upper Lusatia, in the German Electorate of Saxony, circa 1680. He went to school in Zittau, where (according to his own account) he excelled in his studies and became a favorite of Christian Weise, the rector of the local Gymnasium. After he left school he began to travel widely, seeking his fortune. Having saved an alchemist from drowning in a well, he was rewarded with instruction on the fabrication of elixirs. After that Bessler earned his living as a healer and an unlicensed physician. He was also an apprentice watchmaker, until his fortunes improved when he married the wealthy daughter of the physician and mayor of Annaberg, Dr. Christian Schuhmann.

Bessler adopted the pseudonym "Orffyreus" by writing the letters of the alphabet in a circle and selecting the letters diametrically opposite to those of his surname (what would modernly be called a ROT13 cipher), thus obtaining Orffyre, which he then Latinized into Orffyreus. That was the name by which he was generally known thereafter.

=== Orffyreus's wheels ===
In 1712, Bessler appeared in the town of Gera in the province of Reuss and exhibited a "self-moving wheel," which was about 2 m (6 1/2 feet) in diameter and 10 cm (4 inches) thick. Once in motion it was capable of lifting several kilograms (pounds). Bessler then moved to Draschwitz, a village near Leipzig, where in 1713 he constructed an even larger wheel, a little over 2.7 m (9 feet) in diameter and 15 cm (6 inches) in width. That wheel could turn at fifty revolutions a minute and raise a weight of 18 kg (40 pounds).

The eminent mathematician Gottfried Wilhelm Leibniz visited Draschwitz in 1714 and witnessed a demonstration of Bessler's wheel. In a letter to Robert Erskine, physician and advisor to Russian Tsar Peter the Great, Leibniz later wrote that Bessler was "one of my friends" and that he believed Bessler's wheel to be a valuable invention. Bessler also received support from other members of Leibniz's intellectual circle, including mathematician Johann Bernoulli, philosopher Christian Wolff, and architect Joseph Emanuel Fischer von Erlach.

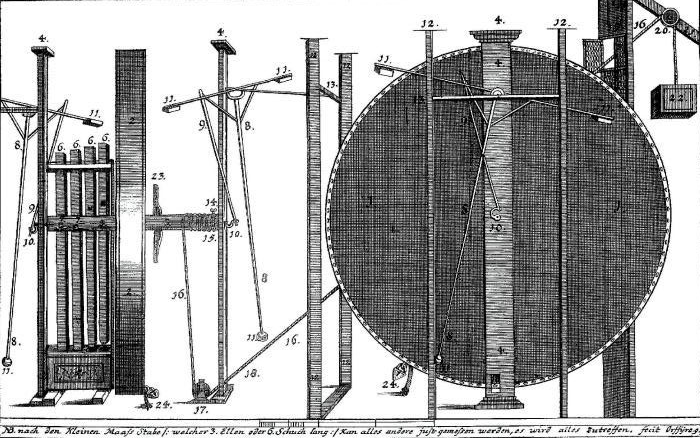
Orffyreus Wheel diagram (Merseburg, Germany)

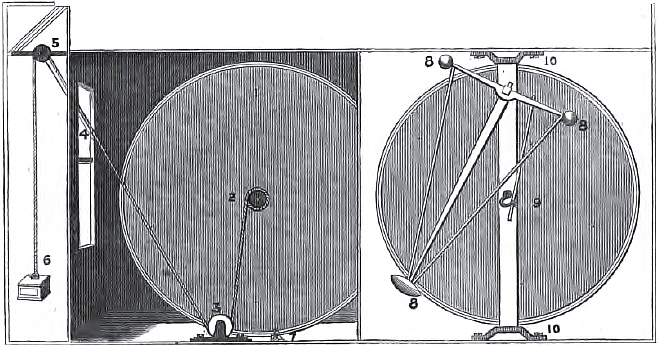
Orffyreus Wheel diagram (Kassel, Germany)

Bessler then constructed a still larger wheel in Merseburg, before moving to the independent state of Hesse-Kassel, where Prince Karl, the reigning Landgrave and an enthusiastic patron of mechanical inventors, appointed him as a commercial councillor (Kommerzialrat) for the town of Kassel and provided him with rooms in Weissenstein Castle. It was there that in 1717 he constructed his largest wheel so far, 3.7 m (12 feet) in diameter and 36 cm (14 inches) thick.

The inventor demonstrated the operation of his wheel before various audiences, always taking care that the mechanism within the wheel should remain hidden from view, purportedly to prevent others from stealing his invention. The wheel was examined externally by several scientists, including Willem 's Gravesande, professor of mathematics and astronomy at Leiden University, who reported that he could not detect any fraud regarding its operation. On 12 November 1717 the wheel was locked in a room in the castle with the doors and windows sealed to prevent any interference. This was witnessed by the Landgrave and various officials. Two weeks later, the seals were broken and the room was opened, whereupon the wheel was found to be revolving. The door was resealed until 4 January 1718. The wheel was then found to be turning at twenty-six revolutions per minute.

Bessler demanded 100,000 Reichsthalers (equivalent to £20,000) in exchange for revealing the secret of his machines. Peter the Great was interested in purchasing the invention and sought advice on the matter from Gravesande and others. Gravesande examined the axle of the wheel, concluding that he could see no way in which power could be transmitted to it from the outside. Bessler, however, then smashed the wheel, accusing 's Gravesande of trying to discover the secret of the wheel without paying for it, and declaring that the curiosity of the professor had provoked him.

=== Later life ===
Bessler and his machine then vanished into obscurity. It is known that he was rebuilding his machine in 1727 and that 's Gravesande had agreed to examine it again, but it is not known whether it was ever tested. Bessler was apparently arrested in 1733, but by 1738 he was again free and living in an estate in Bad Karlshafen, near Kassel. Bessler died in 1745, aged sixty-five, when he fell to his death from a four-and-a-half-story windmill he was constructing in Fürstenburg.

== Mechanism of Orffyreus's Wheel ==
Bessler's devices were all hollow wheels, with canvas covering the internal mechanism, that turned on a horizontal axis supported by vertical wooden beams on either side of the wheel. Christian Wolff, who viewed the wheel in 1715, wrote that Bessler freely revealed that the device utilized weights of about 1.8 kg (4 pounds). Fischer von Erlach, who viewed the wheel in 1721, reported: "At every turn of the wheel can be heard the sound of about eight weights, which fall gently on the side toward which the wheel turns." In a letter to Sir Isaac Newton, 's Gravesande reported that, when pushed, the wheel took two or three revolutions to reach a maximum speed of about 25 revolutions per minute. The wheels at Merseburg and Kassel were attached to three-bobbed pendula, one on either side, which presumably acted as regulators, limiting the maximum speed of revolution.

Bessler never revealed the mechanism that kept his wheel in motion and, according to surviving sources, the Landgrave of Hesse-Kassel was the only person whom he ever allowed to examine the inside of the wheel. In 1719 Bessler published a pamphlet in German and Latin, entitled The Triumphant Orffyrean Perpetual Motion, which gives a very vague account of his principles. He indicated that the wheel depended upon weights placed so that they can "never attain equilibrium." This suggests that it was a kind of "overbalanced wheel," a hypothetical gravity-powered device which is now recognized by physicists as impossible (see perpetual motion).

=== Allegations of fraud ===
Most of the people who met him, including supporters such as 's Gravesande, reported that Bessler was eccentric, ill-tempered, and perhaps even insane. From the beginning, Bessler's work generated accusations of fraud from various people, including mining engineer Johann Gottfried Borlach, mathematician Christian Wagner, model-maker Andreas Gärtner, Kassel court tutor Jean-Pierre de Crousaz, and others. Gärtner went on to gain employ as model-master in the court of Augustus II the Strong in Dresden, and in that capacity he built several devices that reproduced some of the successes of Bessler's public demonstrations, including the locked-room test, but which Gärtner acknowledged as mere trickery.

In November 1727, Bessler's maid, Anne Rosine Mauersbergerin, ran away from Bessler's household and testified under oath that she had turned the machines manually from an adjoining room, alternating in that job with Bessler's wife, his brother Gottfried, and Bessler himself. 's Gravesande refused to accept the maid's testimony, writing that he paid "little attention to what a servant can say about machines". By then, 's Gravesande was embroiled in an academic dispute with members of Isaac Newton's circle about the possibility of gravity-powered perpetual motion, which 's Gravesande persistently defended based partly on his belief that Bessler, though "mad", was not a fraud.

The consensus view of modern scientists is that Bessler was perpetrating a deliberate fraud, though just how his wheel was powered is not entirely clear. According to the writers of Chambers's Encyclopaedia, Orffyreus's wheel, "but for its strange effect on 's Gravesande, would have been forgotten long ago". If the maid's confession were true, the testimonies by Prince Karl, 's Gravesande, and others about the conditions under which the wheel was tested and exhibited must be flawed.
