= Newman's energy machine =

Type of machine

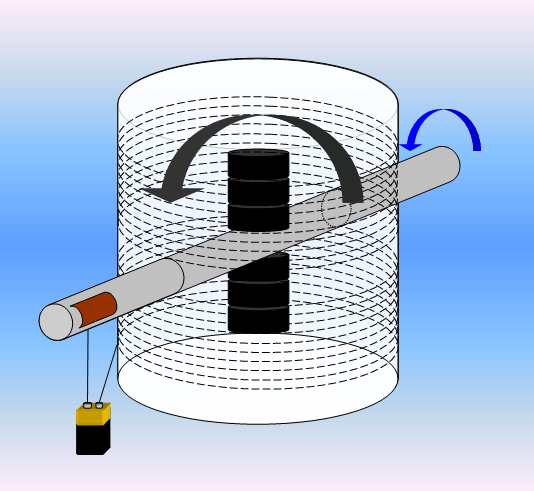
A diagram of the device

Newman's Energy Machine was a DC motor which the inventor, Joseph Newman, claimed to produce mechanical power exceeding the electrical power being supplied to it. In 1979, Newman attempted to patent the device, but it was rejected by the United States Patent Office as being a perpetual motion machine. When the rejection was later appealed, the United States district court requested that Newman's machine be tested by the National Bureau of Standards (NBS). The NBS concluded in June 1986 that output power was not greater than the input. Thus, the patent was again denied. The scientific community has rejected Newman's ideas about electricity and magnetism as pseudoscientific and his claims as false.

== Claims by the inventor ==
By adding rolls to the armature of a motor, a larger and larger counter-electromotive force is generated on the motor. Newman outlined his claims about there being a fundamental electromagnetic interaction in all matter ultimately derived from only one type of force particle propagating at the speed of light. Newman claims that the motor derives its power by converting some of the mass of the copper in the coils into usable energy, in application of Einstein's mass–energy equivalence. According to proponents of the Energy Machine, the most crucial part of the design concerns what happens as a result of mechanical commutation.

== U.S. patent application ==
In 1979, Newman submitted an application for his device to the United States Patent and Trademark Office. The application was eventually rejected in 1983, which set off a lengthy court battle. The United States District Court requested a master of the court to make the final decision. William E. Schuyler, Jr, former Commissioner of U.S. Patent Office, Washington, DC was chosen by the court to make the final decision to award the patent or not award the patent to Newman. Schuyler concluded that evidence to support Newman's claim was overwhelming and found no contradictory factual evidence.

However, the judge ordered Newman's machine to be tested by the National Bureau of Standards (NBS). The National Bureau of Standards (NBS), now known as the National Institute of Standards and Technology (NIST), by request of the patent office, tested the device for several months and got negative results. In every case presented in the NBS report, the output power was less than power input from the battery pack, and therefore the efficiency was less than 100%. The court therefore upheld the rejection of the patent application.

Newman argued that he had been mistreated by the patent office, and tried to have his motor legalized directly by the US Congress. He obtained a hearing on 30 July 1986 in front of several senators, but he was unsuccessful. During the hearing, Newman refused to have the machine tested by independent experts, and senator John Glenn pointed out that his supposedly independent expert actually had a prior business relationship with him.

The case is now cited in the USPTO's Manual of Patent Examining Procedure as an example of an "inoperative" invention that can't have any utility, concretely as a perpetual motion machine.

== Cease and desist order ==
In August 2007 the Alabama Securities Commission issued a cease and desist order to the "Newman Energy Corporation", alleging it had sold unregistered stock in the company. In January 2008 the company tendered offers of rescission to its nine Alabama investors, offering to reverse the sales. Eight of the investors declined the offer, electing to retain their investment; the ninth did not reply. The company agreed to pay the State of Alabama $7,000 in administrative assessments and investigative costs.

== In popular culture ==
The device is referenced in the Big Black song "Newman Generator", recorded for their 1987 Peel Session.

== See also ==
- Ferranti effect
- Gyroscope
- Inductor
- Singly-fed electric machine
- Voltage
- Orgone
- Free energy suppression conspiracy theory
