= Simple Magnetic Overunity Toy =

Perpetual motion machine

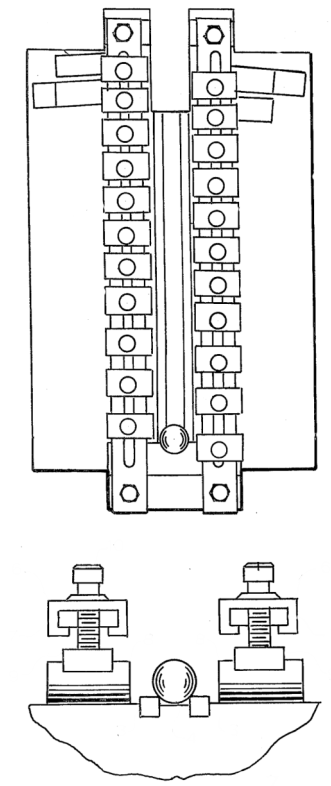
Sketch from Hartman's patent

The Simple Magnetic Overunity Toy (SMOT) is a 1985 invention by Greg Watson from Australia that claims to show "over-unity" energy — that is, it supposedly produces more energy than it consumes, a perpetual motion machine. It is a type of magnet motor.

== Overview ==
In the theoretical SMOT design, a steel ball is pulled up a ramp by an array of permanent magnets. At the top of the ramp it falls, converting magnetic attraction into kinetic energy. A SMOT-like structure is shown in Emil T. Hartman's patent. Watson claims that a mechanism called regauging happens that allows the cycle to be repeated without the application of outside energy.

Perpetual motion ("over-unity") has not been achieved with a SMOT. The ball can be cycled from the starting point of one SMOT to the starting point of a second SMOT (and third and fourth), and by arranging multiple SMOT's in a circle the ball can be circulated along the SMOT's thus giving the illusion of overunity, but the ball can never return to its starting place without adding energy to compensate for frictional losses or for any other energy dissipated by the system.

== Construction ==
The SMOT consists of a non-magnetic inclined plane, a series of permanent magnets, a steel ball and a non-magnetic track (e.g. aluminium). Some versions have a pair of long bar magnets in place of the series of permanent magnets. The inclined plane has a very low grade, but still enough to provide a gain in height.

The track is positioned so that it is directly in the center of the inclined plane. Usually, the surface of the track is almost flush with the inclined plane's surface. The two permanent magnets are long bar magnets, polarized with their poles being at the long side, that are placed almost parallel to the track, but the poles nearest to the top of the inclined plane are closer to the track than they are at the bottom. The ball moves up the track because the magnetic field is stronger when the magnets are closer to the steel ball and each other, and since the net force is towards the top of the ramp, the motion of the ball is also that direction. This is why it is imperative that the magnets are constantly getting closer to the ball, in order to create a net force upwards. The track serves to keep the ball away from the magnets. If the track is not constructed carefully a slight imbalance can send the steel ball off the track into one of the magnets.

== Analysis of operation ==
At the starting point, the ball has the potential energy given it by being put there under the forces of the magnets. When the ball is released, the potential energy is converted to kinetic energy as the ball rolls up the track and drops off the top. The sum of kinetic energy and potential energy is always constant (minus energy lost due to friction). The ball never has more energy than it did when first put into position.

The magnetostatic field produced by any arrangement of stationary permanent magnets is a conservative field of the magnetic scalar potential. This means any magnetic object which moves in a closed-loop path in the field, like the ball in this device, gains no energy from the field, and in the absence of friction ends with the same total energy (kinetic plus potential) it started with. Since any moving object is also subject to friction forces, which dissipate the kinetic energy as it moves, the ball will always end a cycle with less energy than it started with, and will eventually stop moving.
