= Robert L. Park =

American physicist & skeptic (1931–2020)

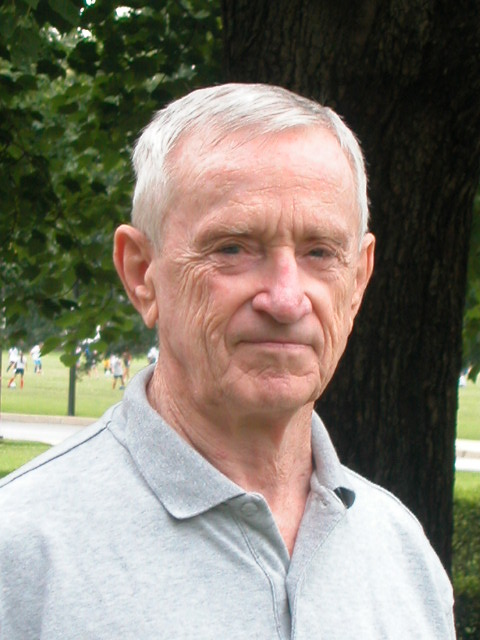
- Undated photo of Park
- Born: Robert Lee Park; January 16, 1931; Kansas City, Missouri, U.S.
- Died: April 29, 2020 (aged 89)
- Education: University of Texas; Brown University
- Known for: Criticism of pseudoscience
- Scientific career
- Fields: Physics
- Workplaces: Sandia National Laboratories; University of Maryland, College Park

Robert Lee Park (January 16, 1931 – April 29, 2020) was an American professor of physics at the University of Maryland, College Park, and a former director of public information at the Washington office of the American Physical Society. Park was most noted for his critical commentaries on alternative medicine and pseudoscience, as well as his criticism of how legitimate science is distorted or ignored by the media, some scientists, and public policy advocates as expressed in his book Voodoo Science. He was also noted for his preference for robotic over crewed space exploration.

== Early life ==
Park was born in 1931 in Kansas City, Missouri. His father was a lawyer and a farmer in southern Texas, and Park had originally intended to attend law school himself. He entered the Air Force in 1951 and served (among other places) at Walker Air Force Base in Roswell, New Mexico until 1956. When the Air Force sent him to radar school, he discovered a passion for physics.

Park obtained his bachelor's and master's degrees in physics at the University of Texas at Austin in 1958 and 1960, and his Ph.D. in physics at Brown University in 1964. During his graduate work he was associated with physicist Harrison E. Farnsworth with whom he co-authored several papers.

== Academic career ==
Park spent almost a decade working as a member of the technical staff, and later director of the Surface Physics Division, at Sandia National Laboratories, a U.S. government weapons research laboratory. In 1974, Park took a faculty position at the University of Maryland physics department, where he remained until retirement. He was director of UMD's Center of Materials Research from 1975 to 1978 and chairman of the Department of Physics and Astronomy from 1978 to 1982.

He was a Fellow of the American Physical Society, the American Association for the Advancement of Science and the American Vacuum Society.

== Public policy work ==
From 1983 until 2006, he was director of public information at the Washington office of the American Physical Society. In this role (which he established), he engaged politicians and the press on matters of science and public policy. The Washington office now employs six people and Park continued in an advisory capacity. He has been seen in the media as an outspoken critic of human spaceflight, efforts to colonize space, and the prototype U.S. National Missile Defense (as well as its predecessor SDI).

Since 2013, Park has been listed on the Advisory Council of the National Center for Science Education.

== Popular writing ==
Park wrote a column, What's New, which appeared on the University of Maryland's website. It featured discussions on topics such as science news, space exploration, energy, the government in science, pseudoscience, alternative medicine, the creation–evolution controversy, and nuclear weapons. Park has also expressed his opinion that Wikipedia is a target for misuse by the "purveyors of pseudoscience", though he has also stated that he finds the site to be both indispensable and "cool". In 2009 Park gave a public lecture at Dartmouth College on Malthusian overpopulation and the environment. He called for the distribution of the birth control pill, "arguably the most important technological development in history", to reduce fertility rates in developing nations. Park has criticized Texas A&M University's Trotter Prize for being awarded to creationist and intelligent design advocate William A. Dembski, whom Park calls "one of the nation's top pseudoscientists", for inappropriately forcing religion and science together.

=== Books ===
In 2000 Park published the book Voodoo Science, which addressed and criticized topics such as alternative medicine, telepathy and homeopathy. Reviewing the book for The New York Times, Ed Regis compared it positively to the 1957 book by Martin Gardner, Fads and Fallacies in the Name of Science, calling Voodoo Science a "worthy successor" and praising it for explaining why various purportedly scientific claims were in fact impossible. Science fiction author Charles Platt reviewed the book for The Washington Post, criticizing it for citing news stories as the inspiration for his criticisms and using ad hominem attacks against individuals criticized rather than performing a more thorough investigation of the topics, and speaking with the actual researchers. This was followed by a number of letters to the editor criticizing Platt for bias.

In 2010 Park published his second book, Superstition: Belief in the Age of Science. Publishers Weekly called the book "disjointed", unfavorably comparing it to Daniel Dennett's Breaking the Spell: Religion as a Natural Phenomenon for merely summarizing the existing arguments about science and religion. Park commented that the reviewer for Publishers Weekly was offended at his assertion that "science is the only way of knowing." Booklist reviewed the book positively for its lucid style, engaging with respected scientists who also hold strong religious faith and its internal logic against claims of supernatural revelation and New Age irrationality. The same review noted that Park was less compelling in addressing his own atheism, neurochemistry and its ability to address problems such as free will.

== Personal life ==
Park was married to Gerry and lived in Adelphi, Maryland. They have two sons, Robert Jr. and Daniel, and three grandchildren.

On September 3, 2000, Park was hospitalized after being struck by a falling oak tree. He later wrote about the experience in his book, Superstition: Belief in the Age of Science.

Park suffered a hemorrhagic stroke on March 17, 2013, which resulted in difficulty with reading, writing, and speech. In a newsletter update to his readers dated July 12, 2013, Park wrote, "Many wonderful people are helping me, but recovery is a long process. I am optimistic that I will resume writing What’s New." Park stated that he will continue writing his newsletter because "the public is often misled by reports in the media and unaware of it".

Park died April 29, 2020, survived by his wife and two sons.

== Awards and honors ==
- 1958 Phi Beta Kappa (University of Texas)
- 1998 Joseph A. Burton Forum Award from the American Physical Society for his What's New column.
- 2008 NCAS Philip J. Klass Award from the National Capital Area Skeptics

== Selected bibliography ==
- Park, Robert L. (2002). Voodoo science: the road from foolishness to fraud. Oxford [Oxfordshire]: Oxford University Press. ISBN 978-0-19-860443-3.
- Park, Robert L. (2010). Superstition: Belief in the Age of Science. Princeton, N.J: Princeton University Press. ISBN 978-0-691-14597-6.
