= Philippe Maes =

Philippus Masius or Philippe Maes, knight, (died 1627), lord of Bodeghem and Ophem, was a diplomat and public servant in the Spanish Netherlands.

== Family ==
Philippe was the youngest son of Jacobus Maes, a member of the Council of Brabant, and Aleide de Tassis. His brothers were Engelbert, president of the Brussels Privy Council; Charles, bishop of Ypres and later bishop of Ghent; and Jean-Baptiste, who like their father sat in the Council of Brabant.

Philippe Maes's first wife, Françoise Foccant, died on 17 February 1602; his second wife, Jacqueline Vanderbeken, on 29 March 1603. Through his second wife he acquired the lordship of Ophem. His third wife was Anne Piermont. By his first two wives he had the following children:

1. Nicolas
2. Jean-Baptiste
3. Jacques
4. Lancelot
5. Marie
6. Catherine

== Career ==
Maes sat in the Estates General of 1598 and the Estates General of 1600 as a delegate of the States of Brabant. From 1610 to 1618 he served the Archdukes Albert and Isabella as their resident envoy to the court of Pope Paul V. In 1618 he was appointed president of the Lille Chamber of Accounts. At Albert's death in 1621 he was careful to see that his office and underlings took the correct steps to publicly mourn the Archduke.

Maes died in Brussels on 18 October 1627 and was buried in the collegiate church of St Peter in Lille.
