= Carolus Maes =

Carolus Masius
- Bishop of Ghent
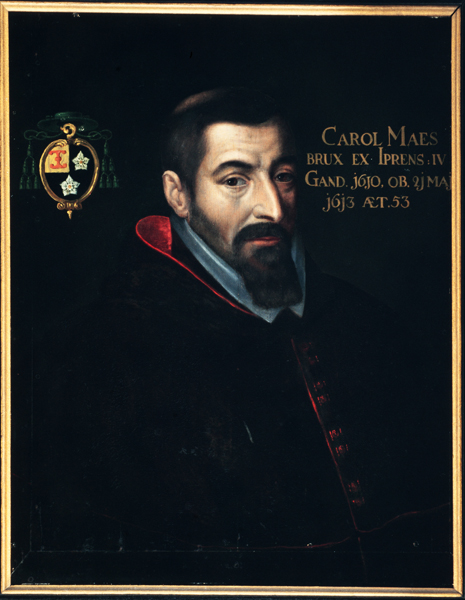
- Province: Mechelen
- Diocese: Ghent
- See: St Bavo's
- Installed: 1610
- Term ended: 1612
- Predecessor: Pieter Damant
- Successor: Franciscus van der Burch
- Previous post: Bishop of Ypres

Orders
- Consecration: 24 June 1607

Personal details
- Born: 1559 Brussels, Duchy of Brabant, Habsburg Netherlands
- Died: 21 May 1612 (aged 52–53) Ghent, County of Flanders, Habsburg Netherlands
- Buried: Crypt of St Bavo's Cathedral, Ghent
- Denomination: Roman Catholic
- Parents: Jacobus Maes and Aleyde de Tassis
- Motto: Deo duce
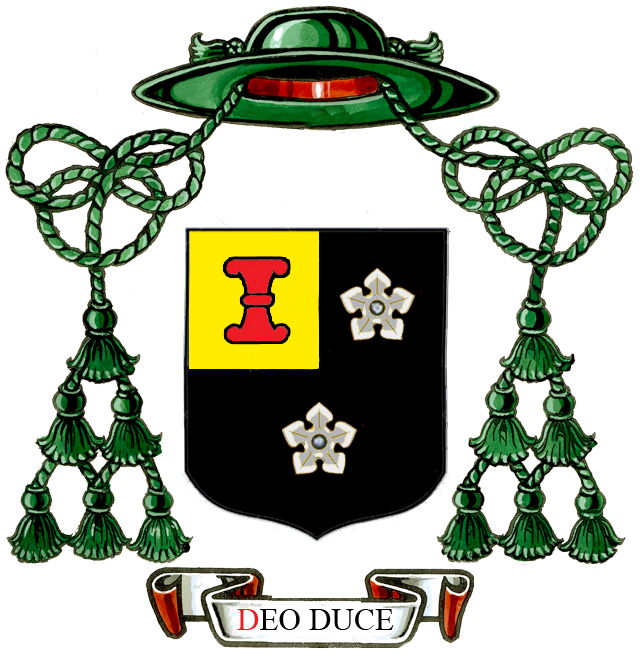
- Coat of arms

Carolus Maes, Latinized Carolus Masius (1559–1612) was bishop of Ypres and later bishop of Ghent in the Habsburg Netherlands.

== Life ==
Maes was born in Brussels in 1559, the son of Jacobus Maes, a member of the Council of Brabant, and Aleyde de Tassis. He received holy orders and on 10 May 1590 was appointed dean of Antwerp Cathedral. He went on to become grand almoner to the Archdukes Albert and Isabella.

He was consecrated bishop of Ypres on 24 June 1607, in succession to Petrus Simons. This was the beginning of a period of peace (due to the ceasefire preceding the Twelve Years' Truce of 1609–1621) and of rebuilding after the devastations of the Dutch Revolt.

After Pieter Damant's death he was transferred to the diocese of Ghent, taking possession of the see on 5 November 1610. In 1611 he co-consecrated Johannes Malderus as bishop of Antwerp. His notable exertions to restore order to his diocese undermined his health, and he died in Ghent on 21 May 1612. Canon Antoine De Smet delivered his eulogy. His main legatee was Marguerite Maes, but he also left a number of relics to his cathedral. He was buried in the cathedral crypt. His monument was damaged in 1666, and a new one designed by Rombaut Pauwels was erected in the choir.

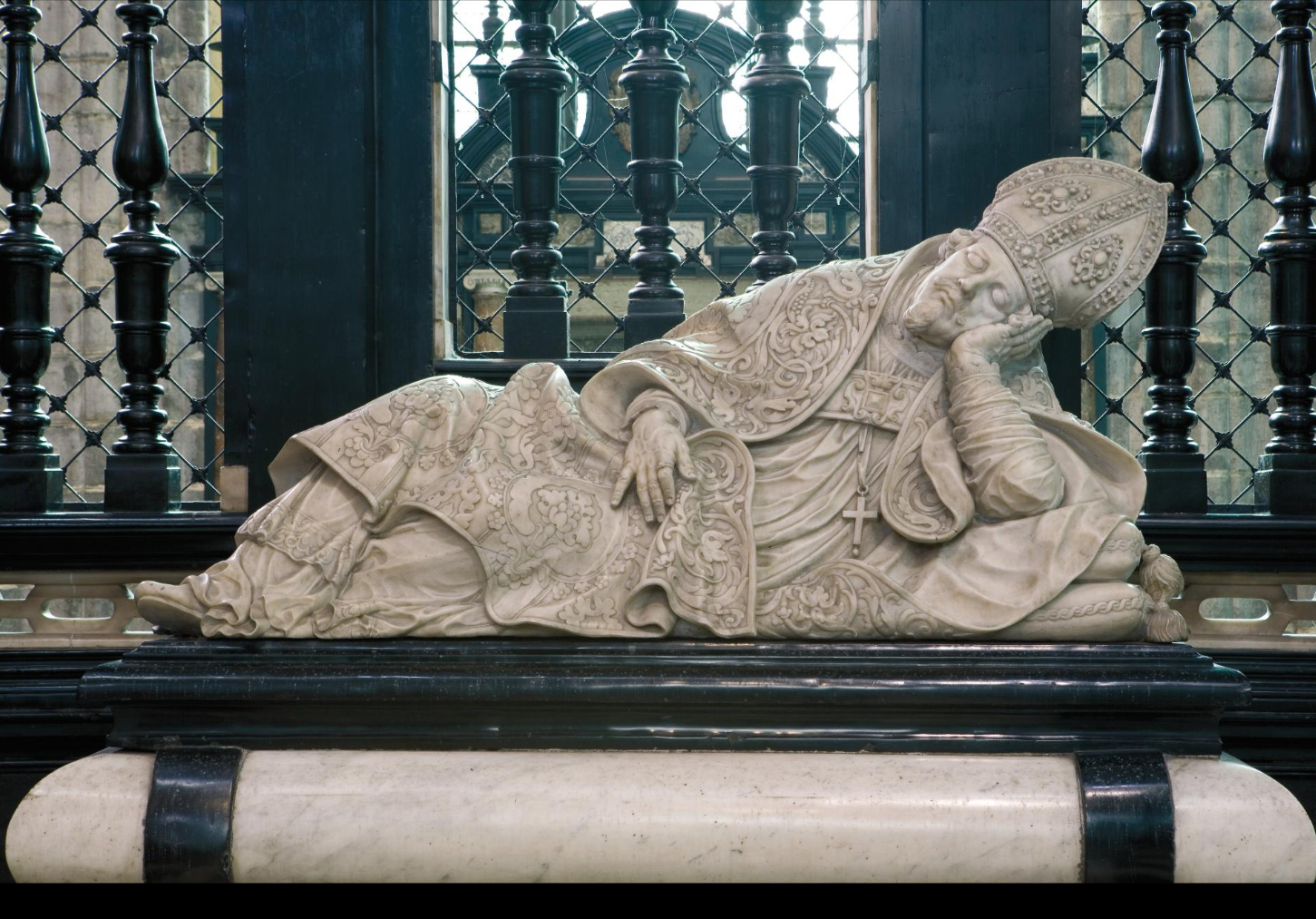
Monument of Bishop Maes by Rombaut Pauwels

Catholic Church titles
| Preceded by Petrus Simons | Bishop of Ypres; 1607–1610 | Succeeded by Joannes de Visscher |
| Preceded by Pieter Damant | Bishop of Ghent; 1610–1612 | Succeeded by Franciscus van der Burch |
