= Lievin Cruyl =

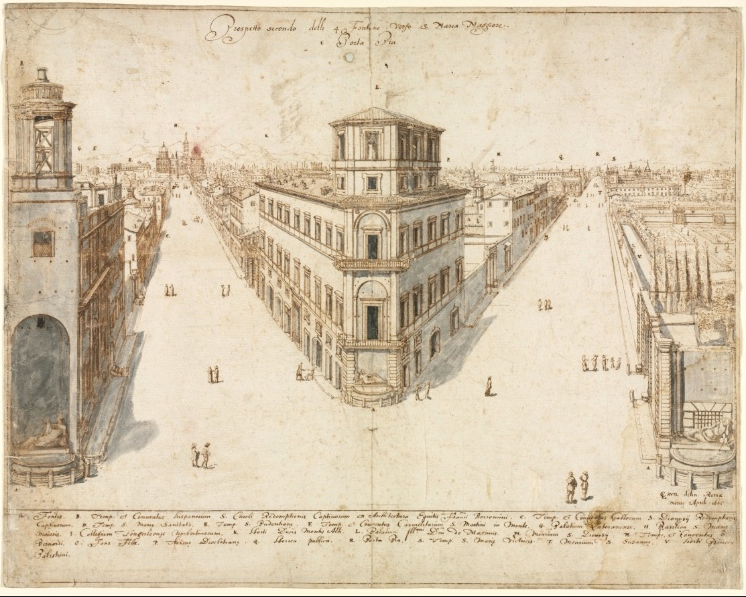
Eighteen Views of Rome – The Quattro Fontane Looking Toward Santa Maria Maggiore

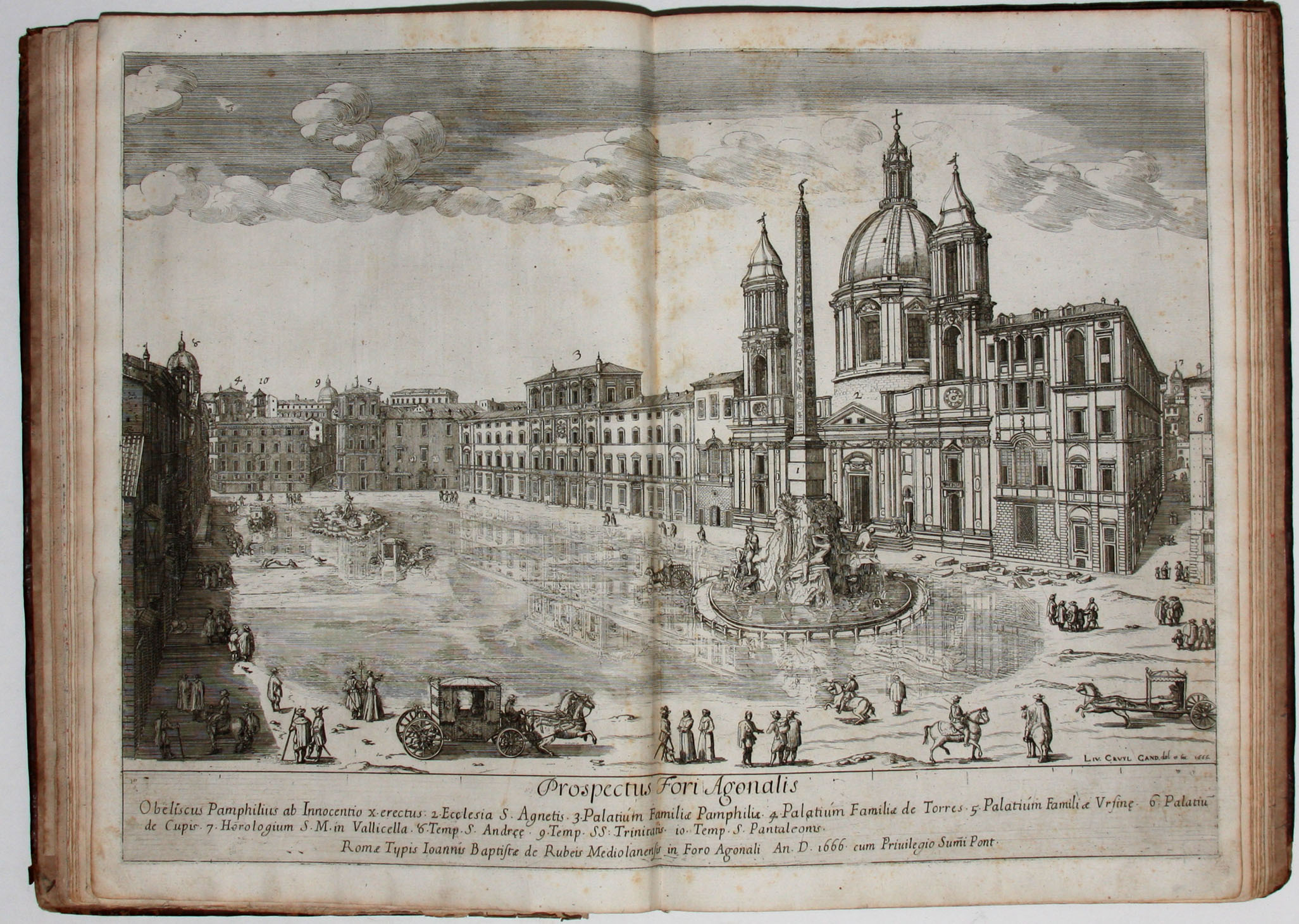
Veduti: Prospectus Basilicę Vaticanę D. Petri.

Lievin Cruyl or Lieven Cruyl (name variations: Levin Cruijl, Lievin Cruijl, Levin Cruyl, Livinus Cruylius, Cruylius Livinus) (5 September 1634 – before 1720) was a Flemish priest and a draughtsman and etcher of landscapes, seascapes, and architectural views. The drawings and etchings he made during his extended stays in Italy and Paris contributed to the development of the topographical views known as veduta.

== Life ==
He was born in Ghent, the illegitimate (later legitimised) son of Joannae (Joanna) Meyerts and Guglielmus (Willem) Cruyl. The details about his life are not always clear, including with respect to the periods of his overseas residences. He studied theology, architecture, drawing and etching at the University of Leuven. He was a priest in Wetteren near Ghent from 1660 to 1664. He was involved as an architect in the completion of the Saint Michael's Church, Ghent, the construction of which had been interrupted because of the iconoclastic troubles of the 16th century. He made a design for the unfinished western tower in a Brabantine Gothic style in 1662. The design was finally not implemented due to cost concerns.

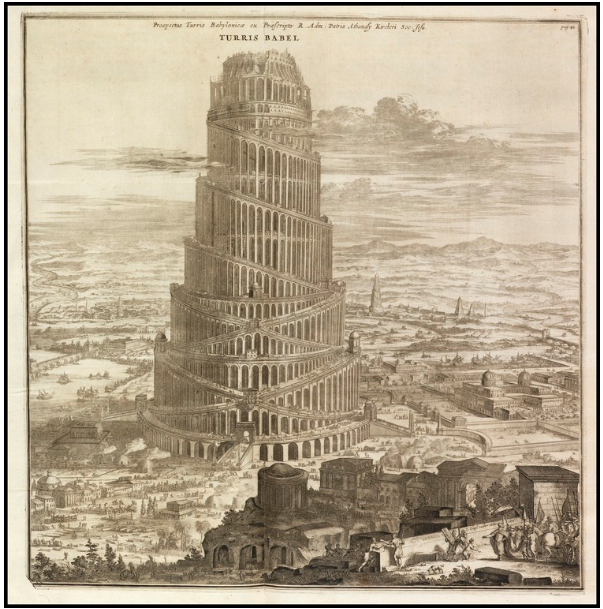
Prospectus Turris Babylonicae

He travelled to Rome where he resided from 1664 to 1675. He travelled in Italy and was in Venice in 1676. He spent time in France between 1680 and 1684 and returned to Ghent in 1684. He made trips to France and is recorded in Paris in 1688. In Ghent he was again involved in an architectural design project, this time for the spire of the Belfry of Ghent. His design for a Baroque spire dated 1684 was finally not implemented.

He died in Ghent.

== Work ==
Lieven Cruyl is mainly known for his drawings and graphic work depicting cityscapes. He made series of drawings as well as individual renderings of the landmarks of Rome. Several of the drawings were later engraved by himself and others including by Giulio Testa. His drawings were dated, frequently by month, between 1664 and 1666 and convey a picture of a busy living city filled with ruins. This was a change from the more staged approach of classicizing painters. The panoramic settings of the drawings and the precise technique are believed to have set a standard for veduta designers and painters after him such as the Dutchman Gaspar van Wittel. He also had a subtle influence on Giovanni Battista Falda's engravings of contemporary and antique structures in Rome.

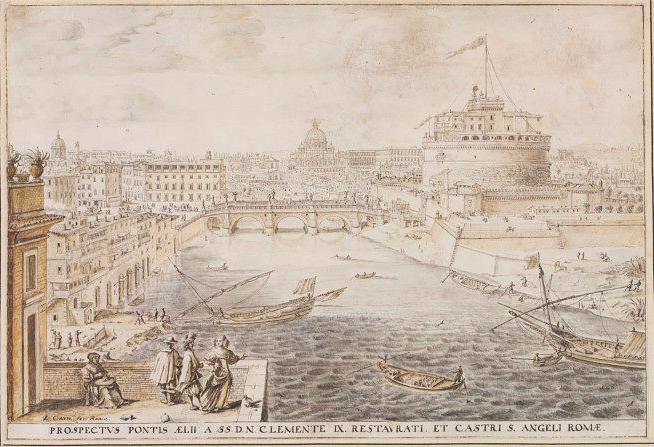
The Tiber at Rome, drawing

Cruyl's drawings depict the topographical aspects of the urban landscape. He preferred unusual and complex perspectives which reflect the scientific construction of his drawings. His drawings reconstruct the city anew according to a specific aesthetic taste and guidelines of a graphic structure. Rome's cityscape was undergoing significant changes at the time because of the extensive building works promoted by pope Alexander VII to enhance the dignity of Rome and himself as the Head of the Catholic Church. Cruyl's drawings with their idealised view of Rome can to a certain extent be regarded as propaganda for pope Pope Alexander VII's urban vision of Rome. The views of Lieven Cruyl were also published to meet the demand of foreigners who wanted to keep souvenirs of their visit.

He also made drawings of other Italian cities such as Florence and Venice and of places in Paris. He further drew a number of imaginary cityscapes of Jerusalem.

A drawing of the View of the construction of the Pont-Royal, Paris, in 1687 was sold at Christie's in London in 2009 for £97,250.

== Selected works ==
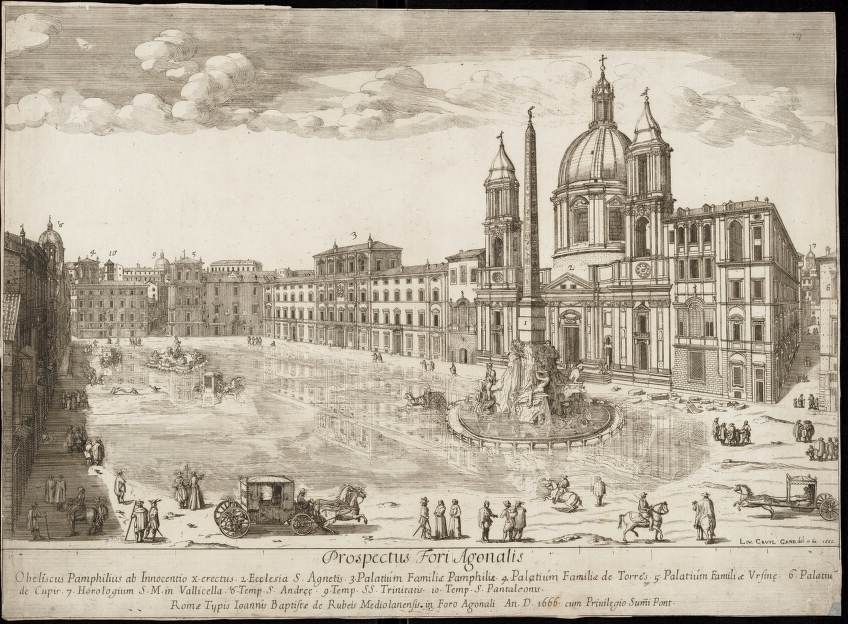
Prospectus Fori Agonali

- A set of Twenty-three Plates of Ancient and Modern Rome; L. Cruyl del. et scul. 1665.
- A set of Views of Roman Ruins &c.; 1667.
- The Triumphs of the Roman Emperors; after Andrea Mantegna; ten plates.

== Bibliography ==
- Benezit (2006). "Cruyl, Liévin", vol. 4, p. 249, in Benezit Dictionary of Artists. Paris: Gründ. ISBN 9782700030709.
- Esther, J.-P. (1996). "Cruyl, Lieven", vol. 8. p. 220, in The Dictionary of Art, 34 volumes, edited by Jane Turner. New York: Grove. ISBN 9781884446009.
- Jatta, Barbara; Connors, Joseph (1989). Vedute romane di Lievin Cruyl: paesaggio urbano sotto Alessandro VII (exhibition catalog). Rome: Accademia americana in Roma. OCLC 22188145.
- Jatta, Barbara (1992). Lievin Cruyl e la sua opera grafica: un artista fiammingo nell'Italia del seicento. Brussels/Rome: Institut historique belge de Rome. ISBN 9074461034.
