= Rombaut Pauwels =

Flemish architect and sculptor (1625–1692

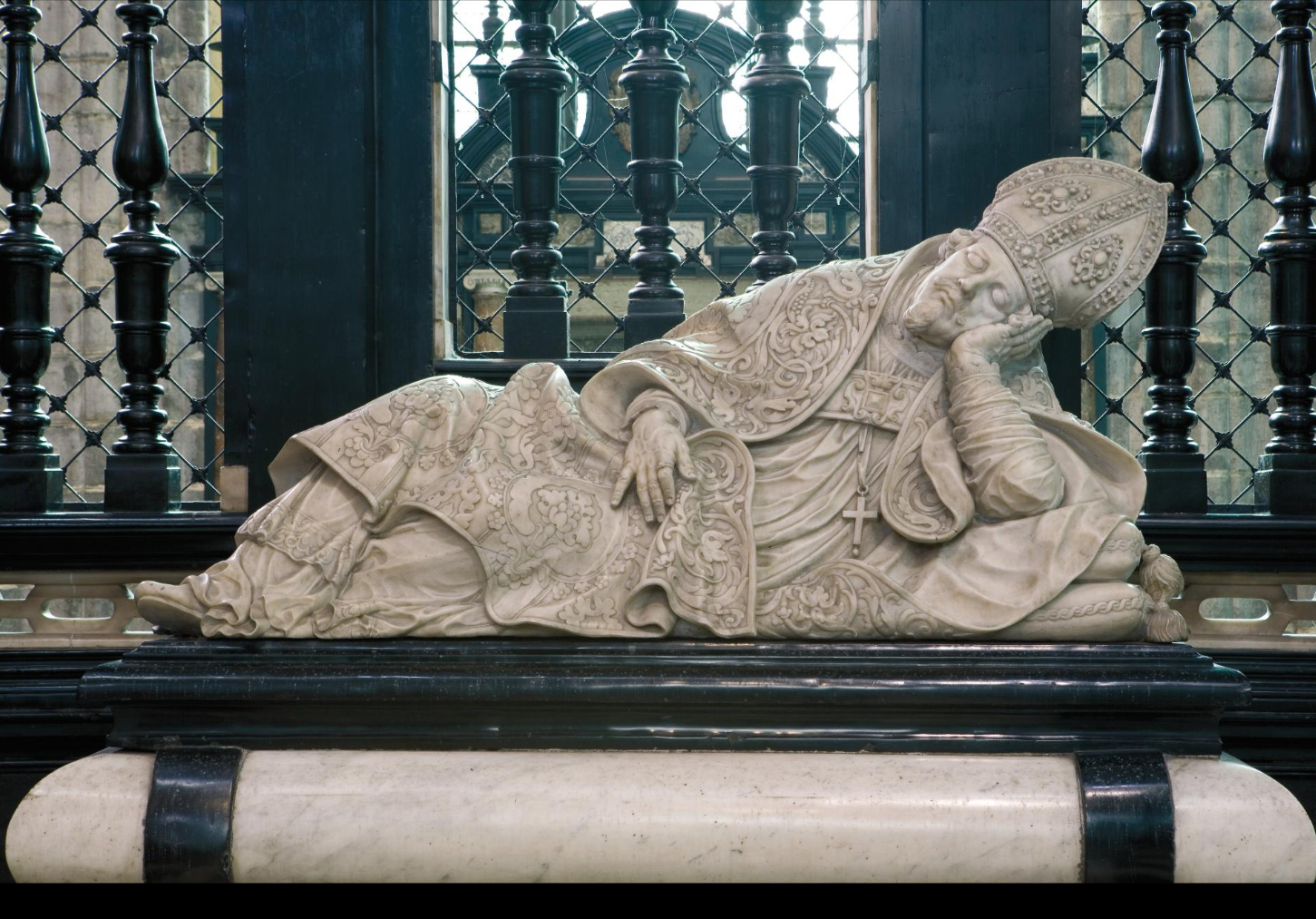
Tomb of Bishop Carolus Maes, St. Bavo Cathedral, Ghent

Rombaut Pauwels or Rombout Pauwels (or Pauli; 1625 in Mechelen – 4 January 1692 in Ghent) was a Flemish architect and sculptor who worked in a moderate Baroque style. He was active mainly in his hometown of Mechelen and in Ghent.

== Life ==
Pauwels was a pupil of the sculptors Rombout Verstappen and Jacob Voorspoel in Mechelen.

He travelled to Rome where he was introduced to the work of his compatriot the Brussels sculptor François Duquesnoy. François Duquesnoy ran a very successful workshop in Rome which produced sculptures in a classicizing Baroque style. Jérôme Duquesnoy the Younger, the younger brother of François Duquesnoy, and the Antwerp sculptor Artus Quellinus the Elder also worked in this workshop in Rome. They and Pauwels brought the moderate Baroque style of François Duquesnoy with them when they returned to the Southern Netherlands.

After his return to Flanders, Pauwels was active mainly in Mechelen and in Ghent.

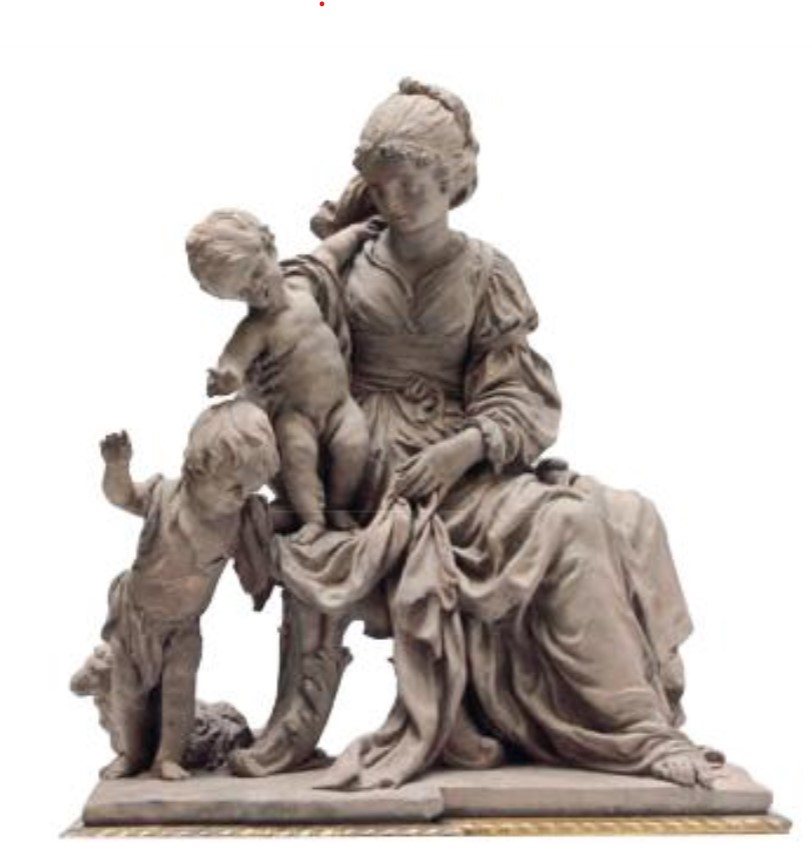
Virgin and Child with St John the Baptist

Pauwels's pupils included the brothers Hendrik and Jan Matthys.

== Work ==
Pauwels was a capable sculptor who worked in the classicizing Baroque style pioneered by François Duquesnoy but he lacked the virtuoso technique of his contemporaries Artus Quellinus and Lucas Faydherbe with whom he regularly collaborated.

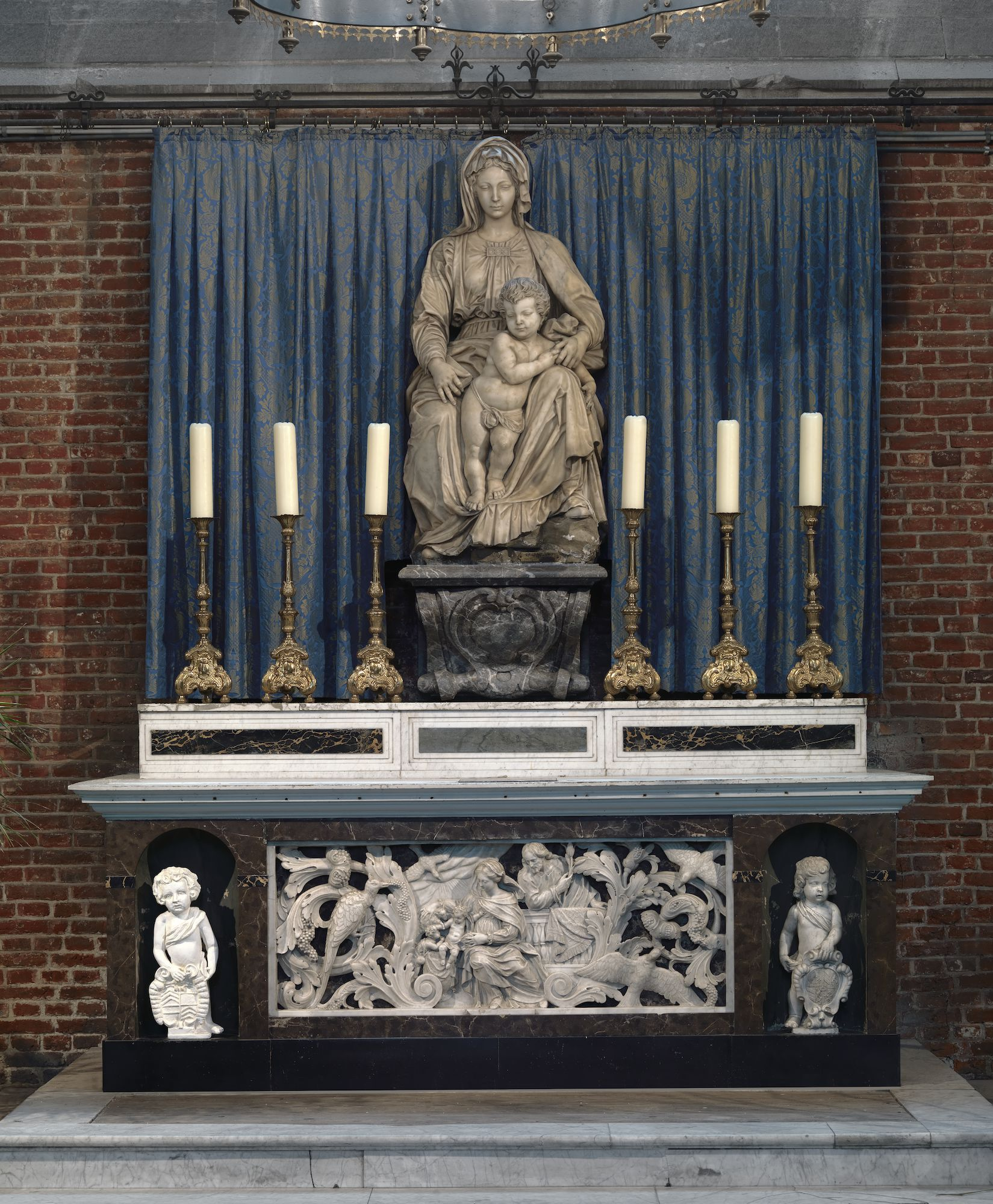
Our lady with child in Saint Michael's Church Ghent

In Ghent, he completed various commissions such as the Baroque gate to the local fish market which was a collaborative effort with Artus Quellinus and J.B. van Helderbergh. In Ghent, he was responsible for the tomb of bishop Carolus Maes in Ghent Cathedral and the marble statue of a "Madonna with Child" (after a work of Michelangelo) in St Michael's Church. Both works are representative of the rather static and classicizing style of Pauwels.

In Mechelen, he collaborated with the leading Baroque sculptor of the city, Lucas Faydherbe, on the tomb of Archbishop Andreas Creusen (1660) and an altar (1660–1665) in St. Rumbold's Cathedral.

A terracotta Virgin with Child and Saint John the Baptist (c.1650, exhibited in Paris in 2013, private collection) is a more dynamic work.

== See also ==
- List of architects

- List of sculptors
