= Saint Michael's Church, Ghent =

Roman Catholic church in Ghent, Belgium

Coordinates: 51°03′13″N 3°43′09″E

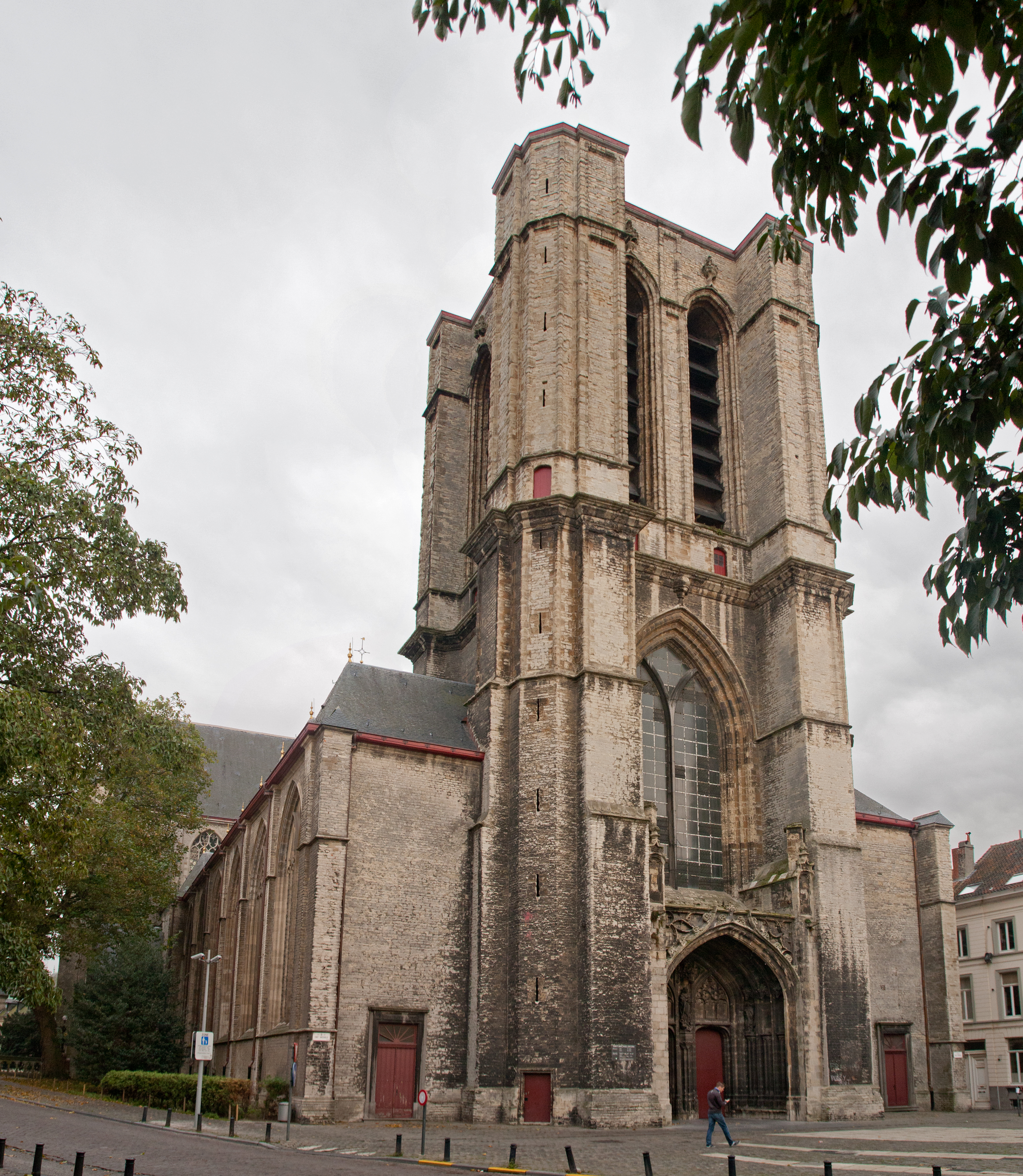
Façade

Saint Michael's Church (Dutch: Sint-Michielskerk) is a Roman Catholic church in Ghent, Belgium, built in a late Gothic style. It is known for its rich interior decoration.

== History ==
Documents from 1105 testify to the existence on the site of a chapel dedicated to Saint Michael, which was subordinate to another parish. The building was twice destroyed by fire early in the 12th century and rebuilt. From 1147, it was recognized as an independent parochial church.

Construction of the current late Gothic church was probably commenced in 1440, and took place in two phases, separated by a long interval. During the first phase, in the 15th and 16th centuries, the western part of the building was built, including the tower, the three-aisled nave and transept. This was completed in 1528. The construction of the western tower continued, and by 1566, two levels of the tower were completed. Then, due to religious conflicts, not only did construction stop, but looting and destruction took place. Part of the church was destroyed in 1578 by Calvinists and in 1579 the old choir was demolished.

Reconstruction of the church only started in 1623. The early Gothic choir was replaced by a choir in Brabantine Gothic style. Local architect Lieven Cruyl made a design for the unfinished western tower in 1662. The design provided for a 134-metre-high spire in Brabantine Gothic style, but was never realised. As a result of these delays and cost concerns, the tower was in the end never completed. Only in 1828 was a flat roof built over the unfinished tower.

The sacristy in the north-east was constructed in Baroque style in 1650–51.

== Description ==
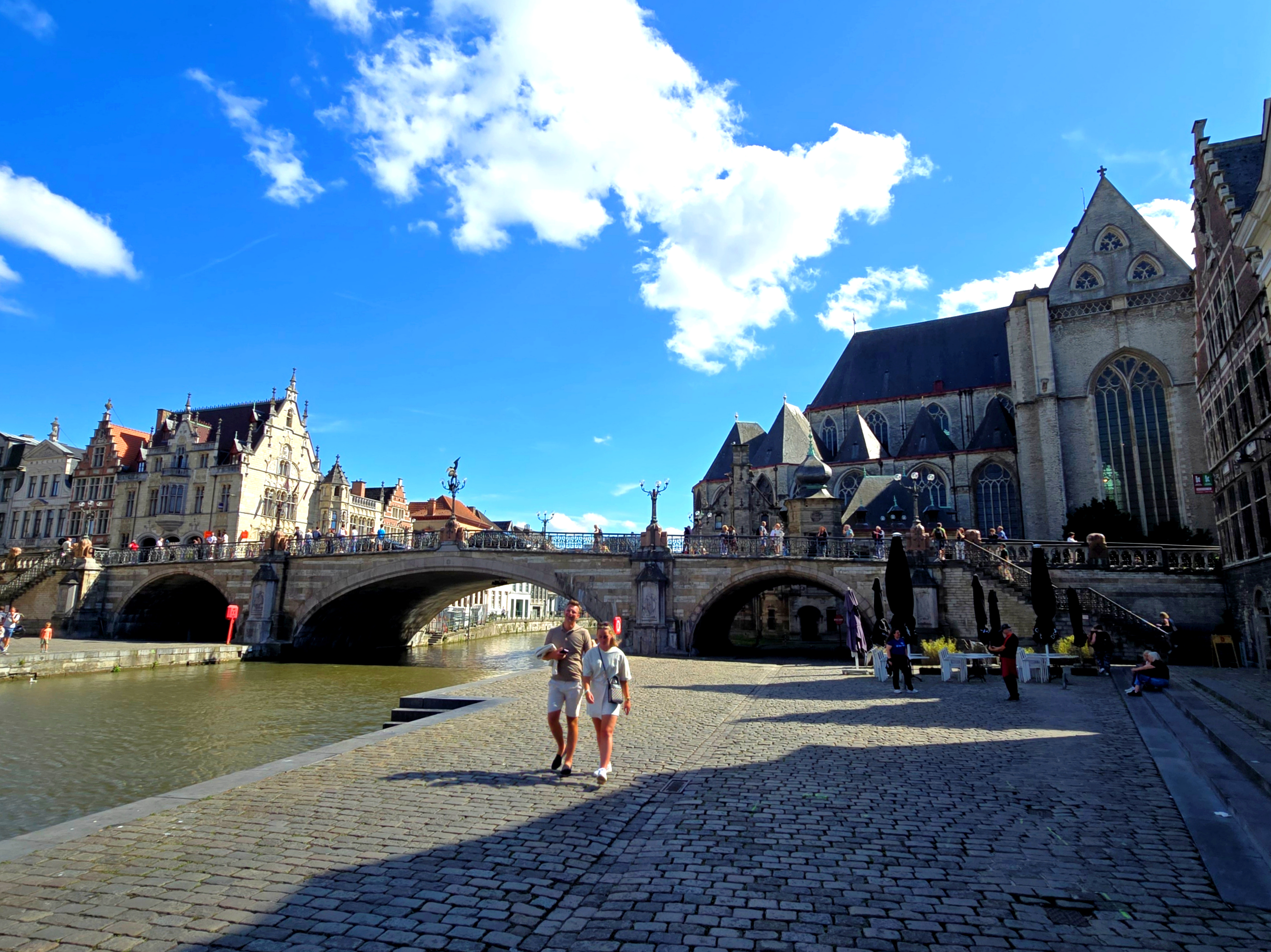
Saint Michael' bridge over the Lys (Leie) river and Saint Michael' church

The exterior of the sober late Gothic church is entirely constructed with sandstone from Brussels and Ledian sandstone. The church has a rich neo-Gothic interior, including an altar and a pulpit in that style. There are various 18th-century statues, including a Saint Livinus by Laurent Delvaux, a wooden Saint Sebastian by J. Franciscus Allaert, eight marble statues of saints and a copy of Michelangelo's Madonna of Bruges by Rombaut Pauwels.

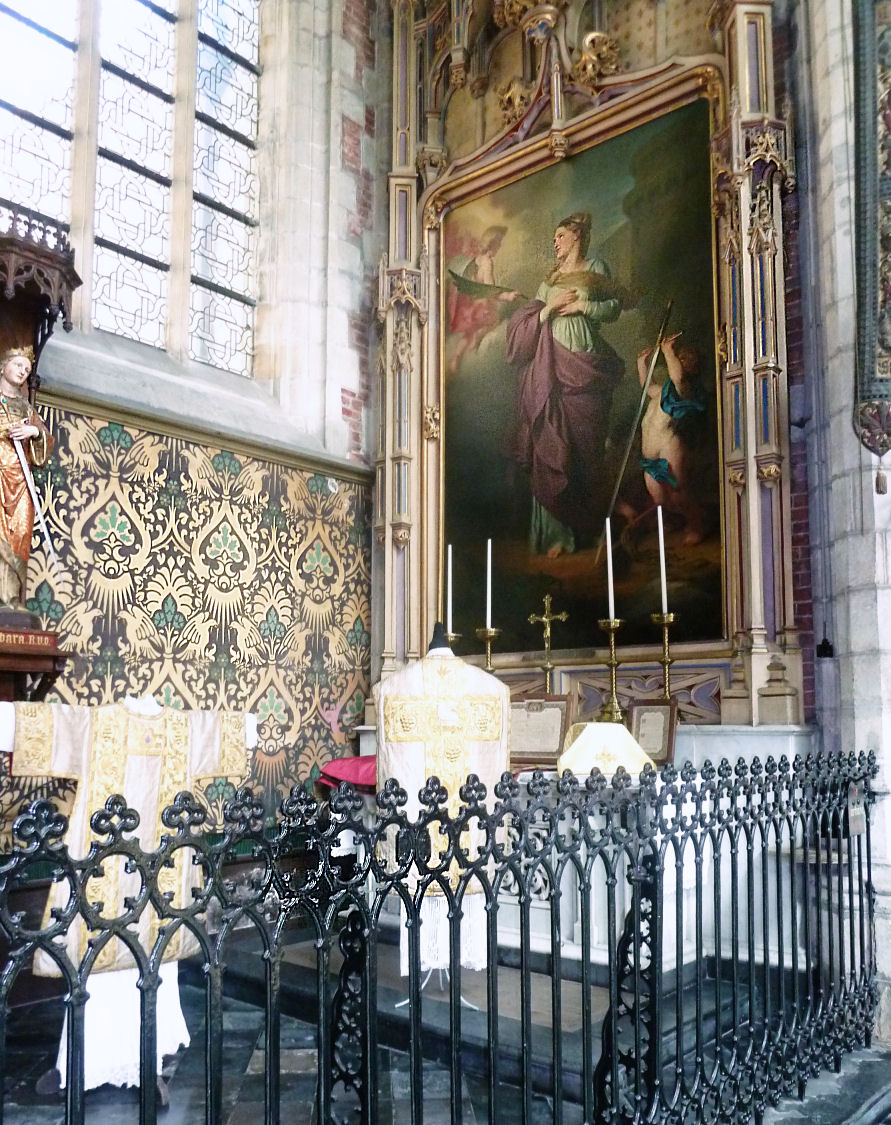
Chapel of St. Barbara

The church contains many Baroque paintings, including Christ Dying on the Cross by Anthony van Dyck, the Resurrection of Lazarus by Otto Venius and paintings by Gaspar de Crayer, Philippe de Champaigne, Karel van Mander, Jan Boeckhorst, Antoon van den Heuvel, Theodoor van Thulden and others.

There are confessionals from various style periods including an early 17th-century Baroque confessional by François Cruyt with statues sculpted by Michiel van der Voort the Elder.

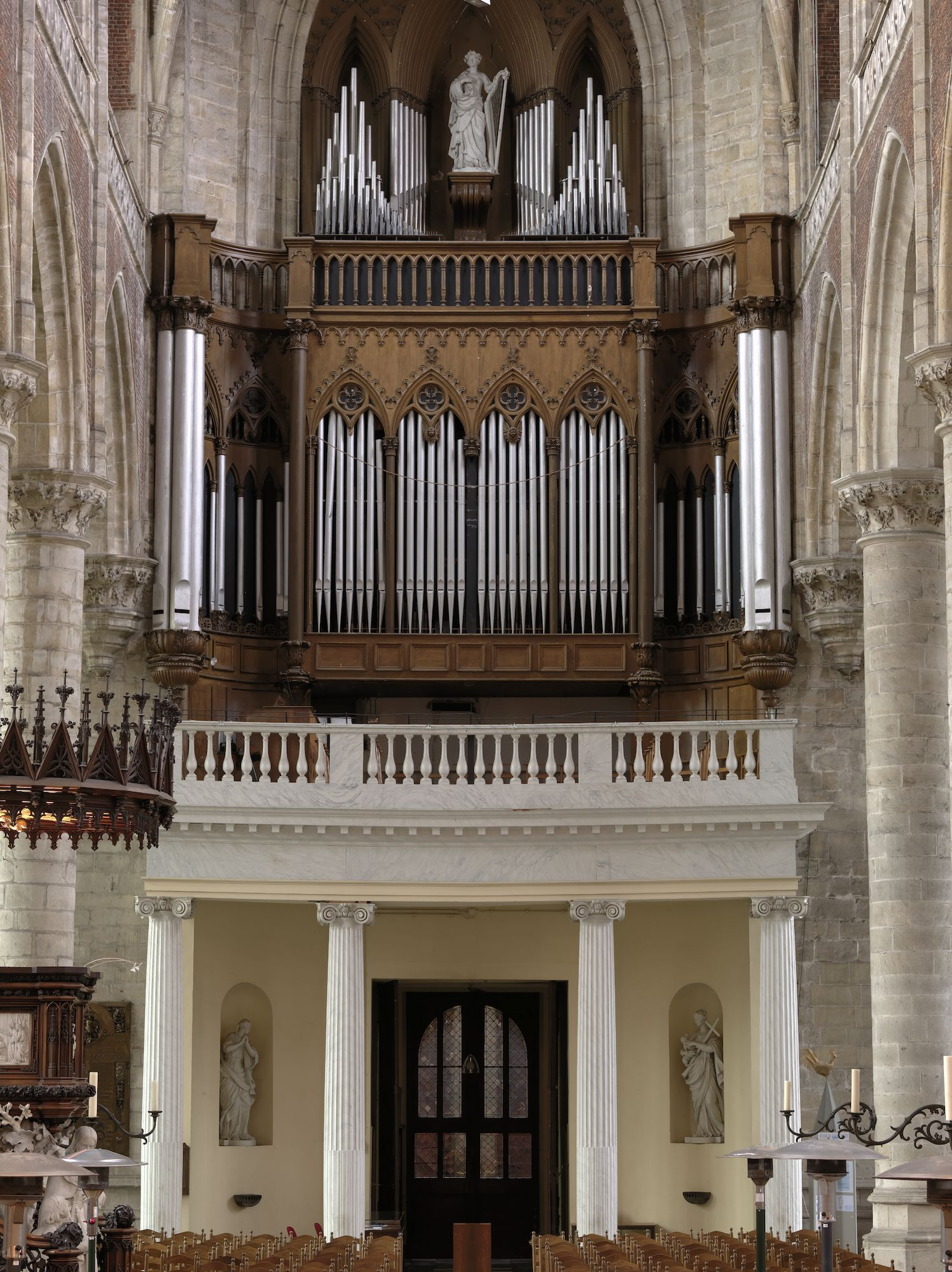
Organ

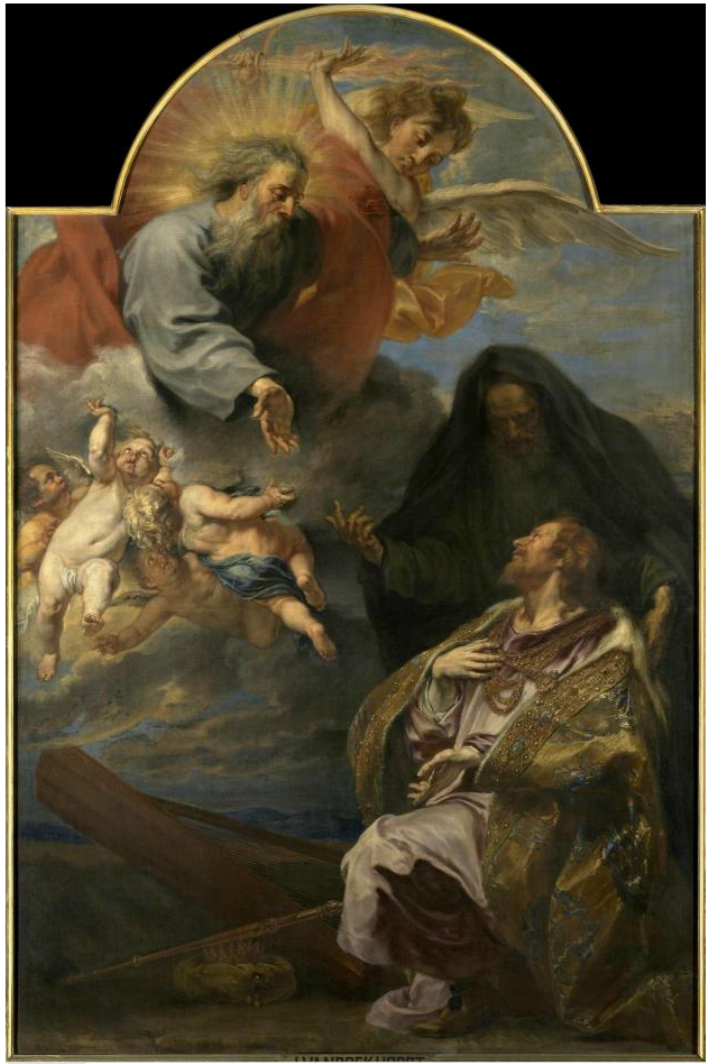
The Repentance of David by Jan Boeckhorst

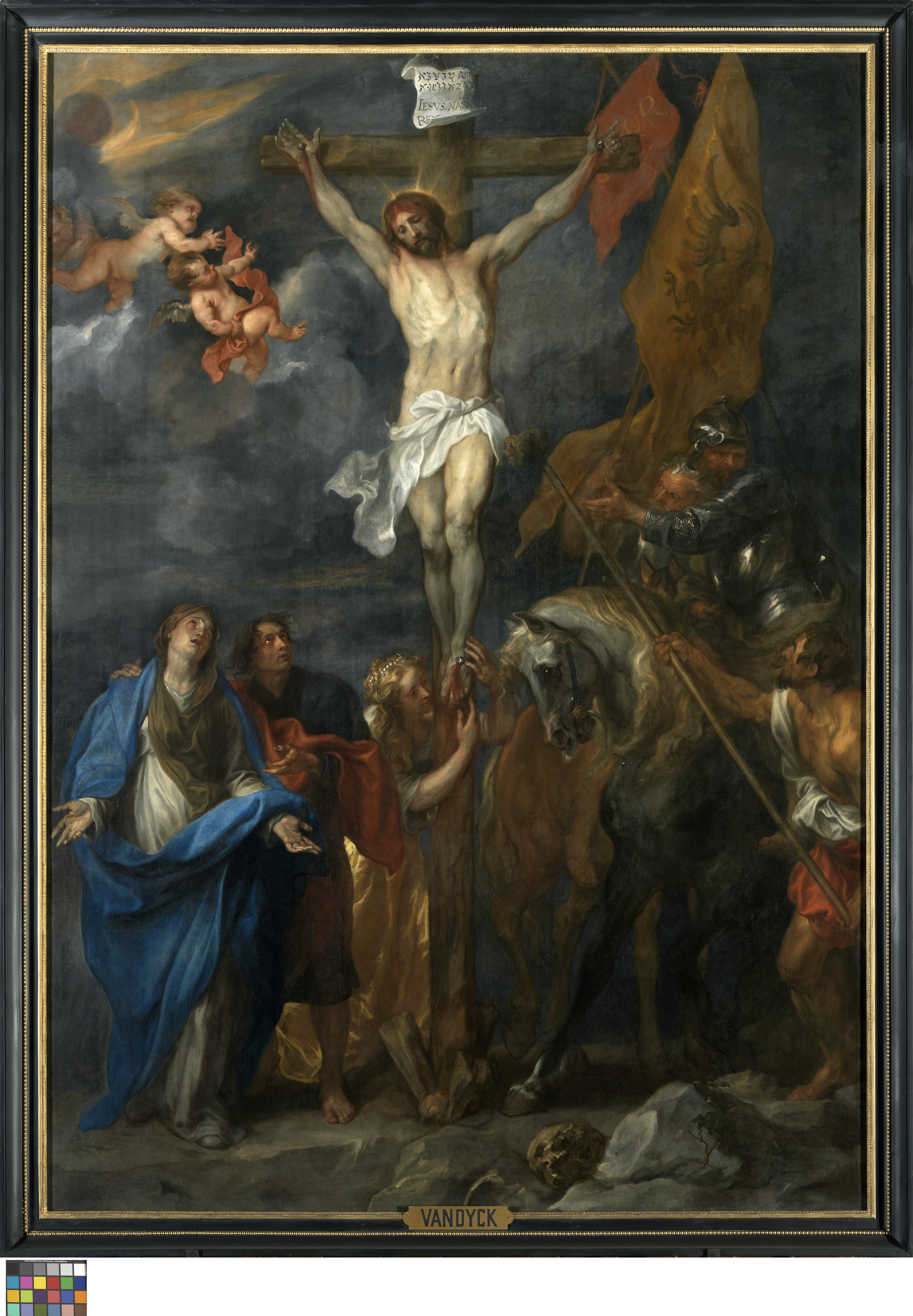
Christ on the Cross by Anthony Van Dyck

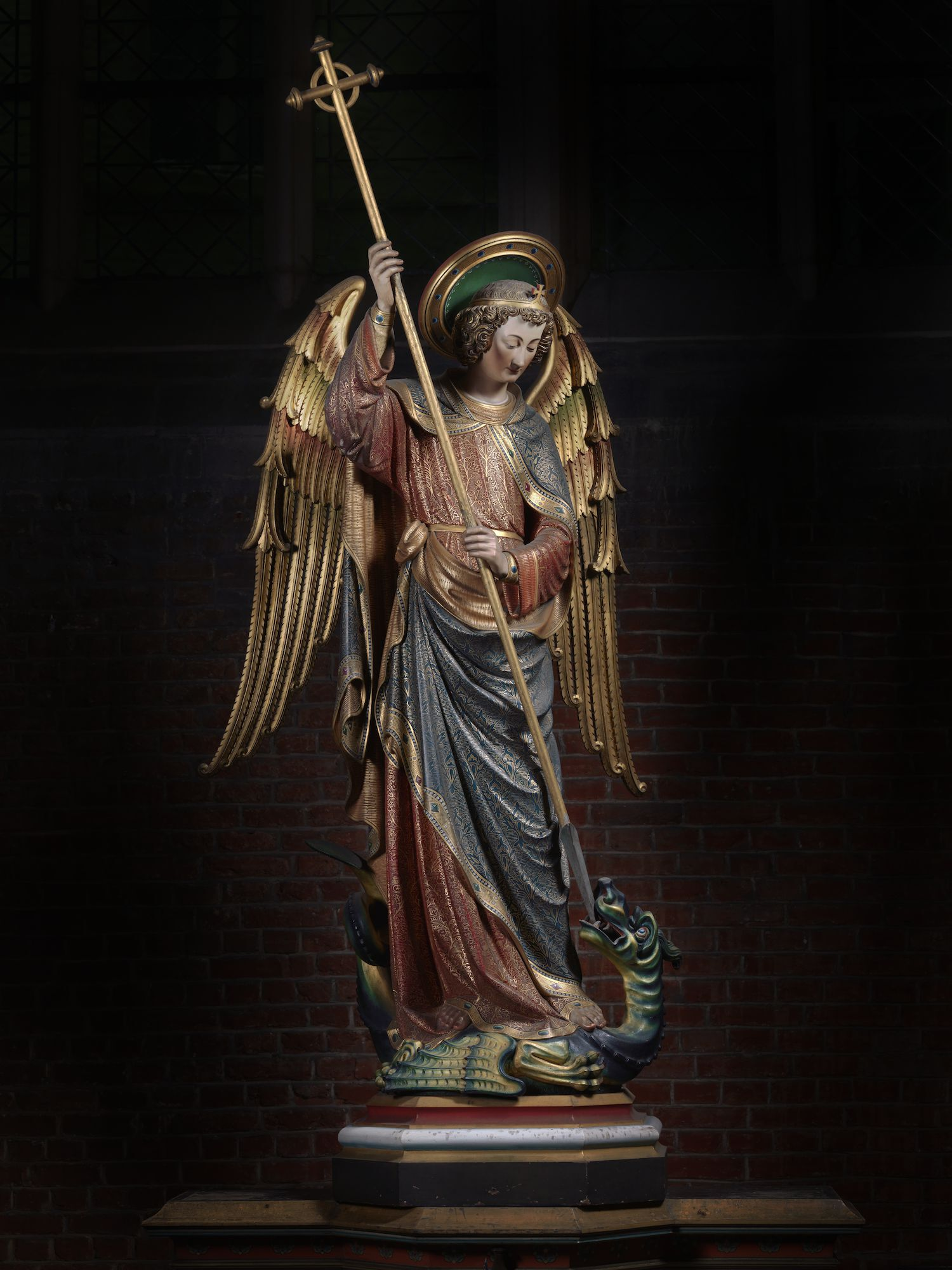
Archangel Michael tramples the dragon

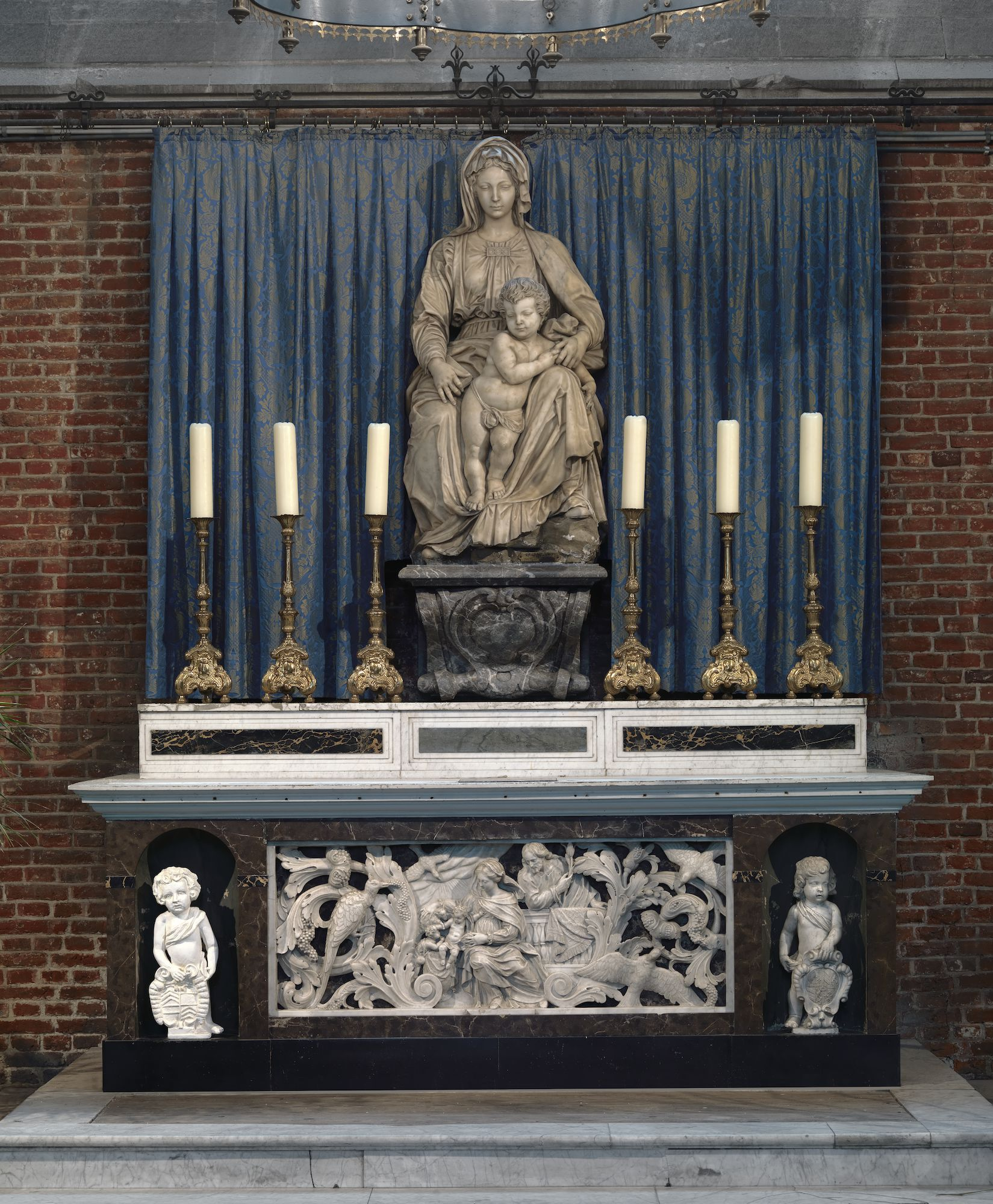
Our Lady with Child by Rombaut Pauwels

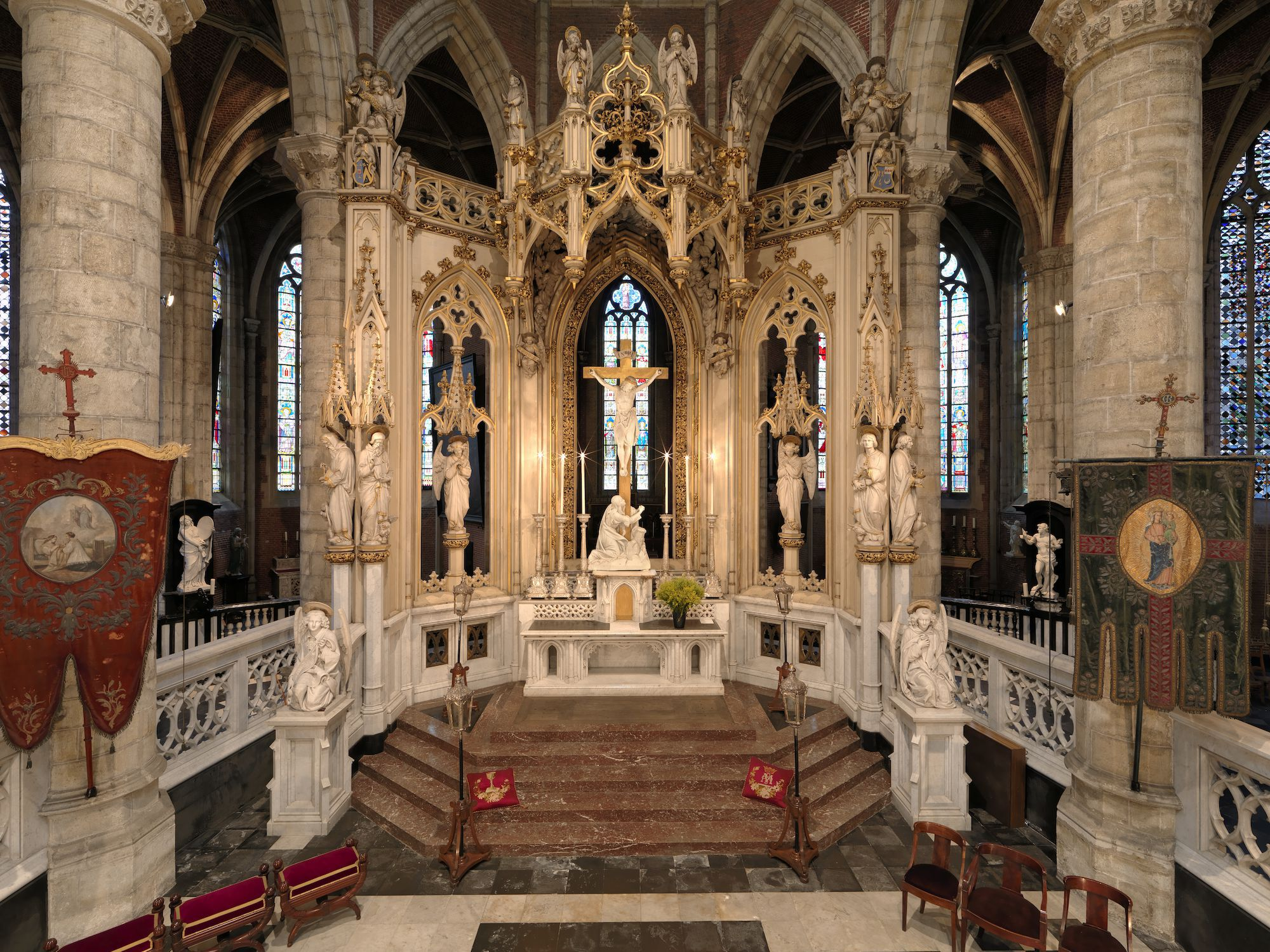
Main altar by Jan Van Arendock

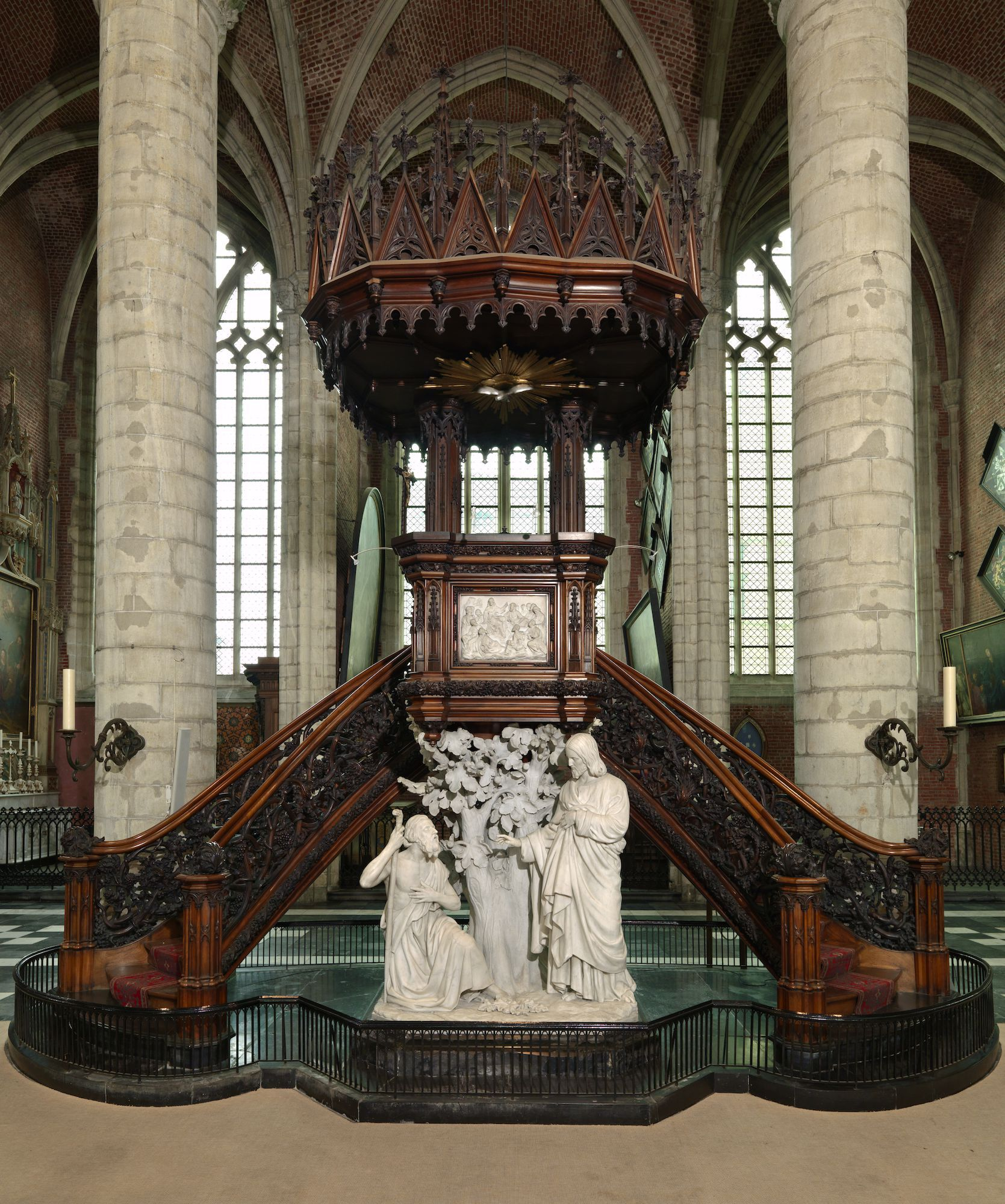
Pulpit by Jean François Franck

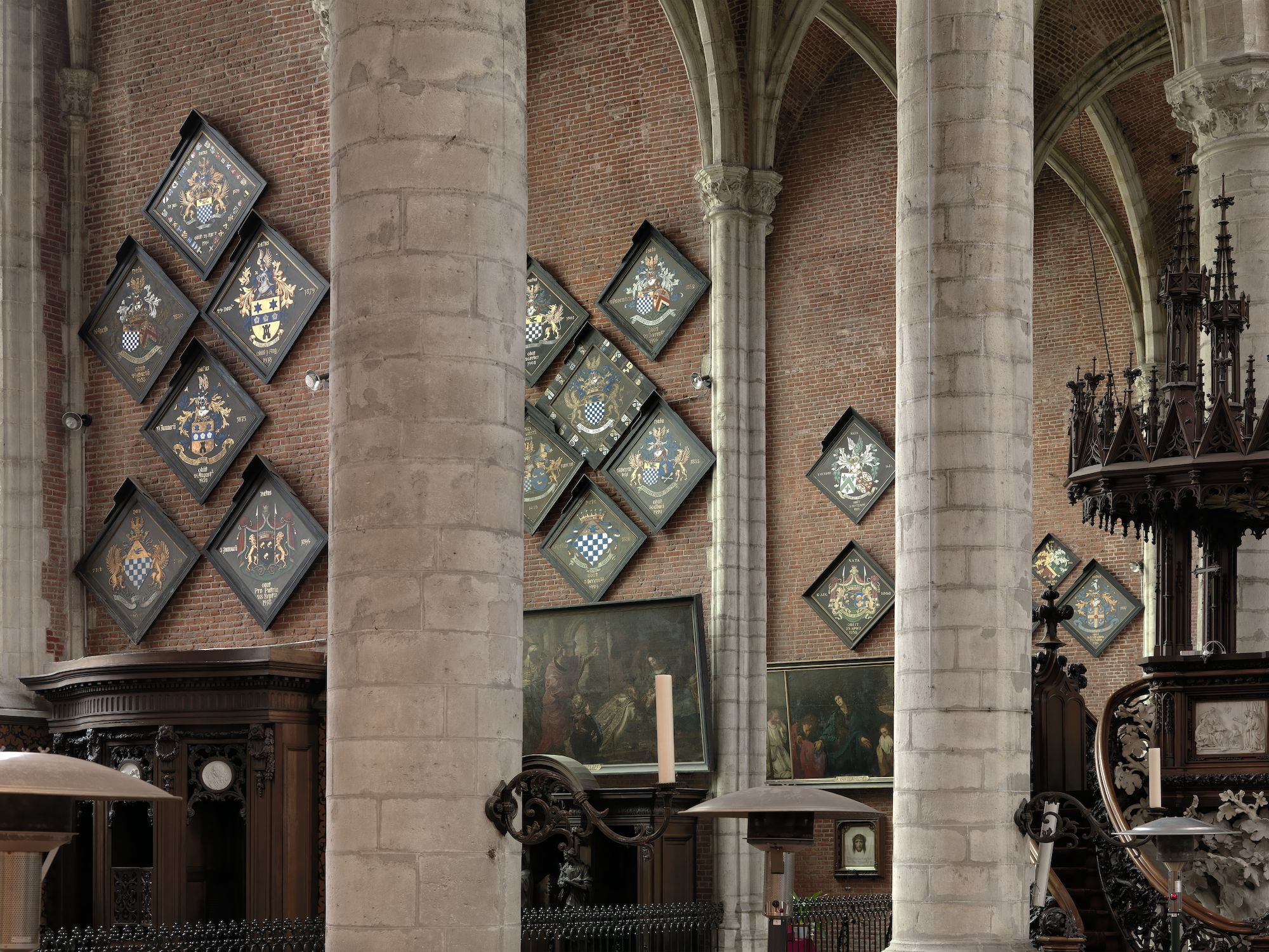
Coats of arms

=== Organ ===
The organ dates back to an instrument that was built in 1817 by the organ builder De Volder. The style of the front is fully made in neo-Gothic style. In 1951, the instrument was remodeled and expanded by the organ builder Anneessens. The organ has 47 stops on three manuals and a pedal.

=== Church treasure ===
There are numerous silver and gold artifacts in the silver collection. An important item is the relic of Saint Dorothea, in silver. Very famous is the relic of the sacred "Doorn" brought to the church by Mary, Queen of Scots, and a relic of the true Cross a gift of the Archduke Albrecht and Isabella in 1619.
