= Engelbert Maes =

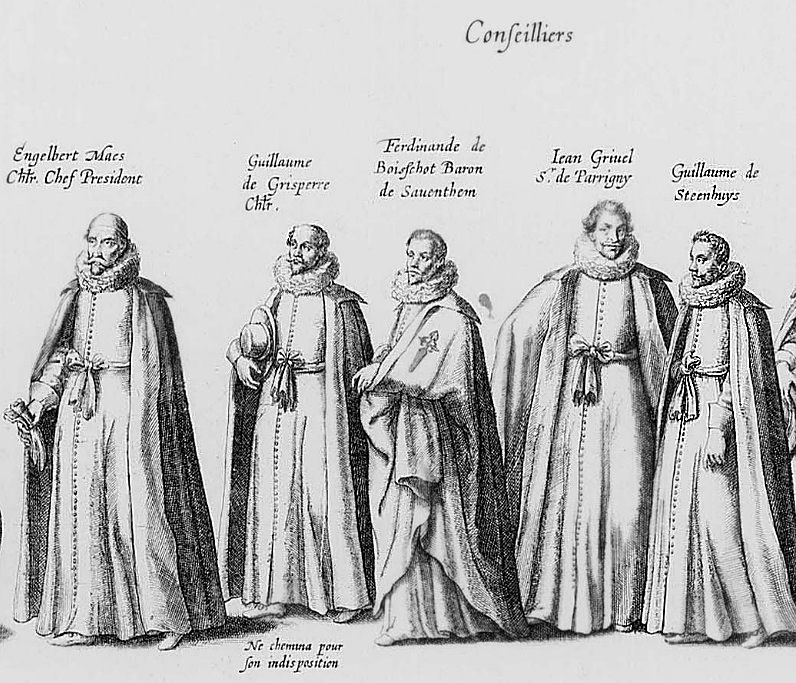
- Funeral cortege of Archduke Albert (1622), Engelbert Maes at furthest left (detail from Jacob Franquart, Pompa funebris Alberti Pii Austriaci, Brussels, 1623).

President of the Privy Council of the Habsburg Netherlands
- In office 1614–1630
- Monarchs: Archdukes Albert and Isabella (1598–1621); Philip IV of Spain (1621–1665)
- Governor General: Isabel Clara Eugenia (1621–1633)
- Preceded by: Jean Richardot
- Succeeded by: Pieter Roose

Personal details
- Born: 1545 Antwerp, Duchy of Brabant, Habsburg Netherlands
- Died: 9 October 1630 (aged 84–85) Brussels, Duchy of Brabant, Spanish Netherlands
- Resting place: Church of St Gudula, Brussels
- Spouse: Pauline Schoyte
- Relations: Carolus Maes (brother); Philips Maes (brother)
- Children: 3
- Parent(s): Jacobus Maes and Aleide de Tassis
- Education: civil law
- Alma mater: Leuven University

Engelbert Maes (1545–1630), was chief-president of the Privy Council of the Habsburg Netherlands and Council of State from 1614 to 1630.

== Career ==
Engelbert was the son of Jacobus Maes, a member of the Council of Brabant, and Aleyde de Tassis. He was born in Antwerp and studied civil law at Leuven University, where he matriculated on 17 October 1560. After graduation he served as pensionary of the city of Antwerp. Under Alexander Farnese, Duke of Parma he became auditor general of the Army of Flanders and a member of the Great Council of Mechelen. In 1603 the Archdukes Albert and Isabella appointed him to their Privy Council, and in 1614 as president of the Privy Council and the Council of State.

He married Pauline Schoyte and together they had three children: Jean-Baptiste, later a member of the Council of Finance, and two daughters, Adrienne and Hélène, who married the brothers Jean and Charles della Faille. His wife died in 1618, he himself on 9 October 1630. He was buried in the Magdalen Chapel of the Church of St. Michael and St. Gudula (now Brussels' cathedral).
