= Jacobus Maes =

Habsburg Netherlands lawyer (1505–1569)

Jacobus Maes or Jacob Maes (1505–1569) was a lawyer and public official in the Habsburg Netherlands, serving as the pensionary of the city of Antwerp and a member of the Privy Council of the Habsburg Netherlands.

== Life ==
Jacobus was born in Antwerp in 1505 as the son of Joannes Maes and Gommarina van Merle. After serving as pensionary of the city of Antwerp, he was appointed a member of the Privy Council of the Habsburg Netherlands by Mary of Hungary, the governor of the Habsburg Netherlands. Maes unsuccessfully opposed the rigour of the new edicts against heresy issued in 1550 but was not prosecuted for these actions. Charles V, Holy Roman Emperor abdicated from all his rights to the Habsburg Netherlands in favour of his son Philip on 25 October 1555 at the Palace of Coudenberg in the city of Brussels. Maes had the honor of being responsible for responding on behalf of all states of the Habsburg Netherlands to Charles V's address at this occasion.

He married Aleyde de Tassis, of the Thurn und Taxis family, and together they had four children: Engelbert, who became president of the Privy Council; Carolus, who became bishop of Ypres and later bishop of Ghent; Johannes Baptist, a member of the Council of Brabant; and Philippus, greffier to the States of Brabant, who from 1610 to 1618 represented the Archdukes Albert and Isabella at the papal court.

Jacobus Maes died in Brussels in 1569.
