= Pieter Roose =

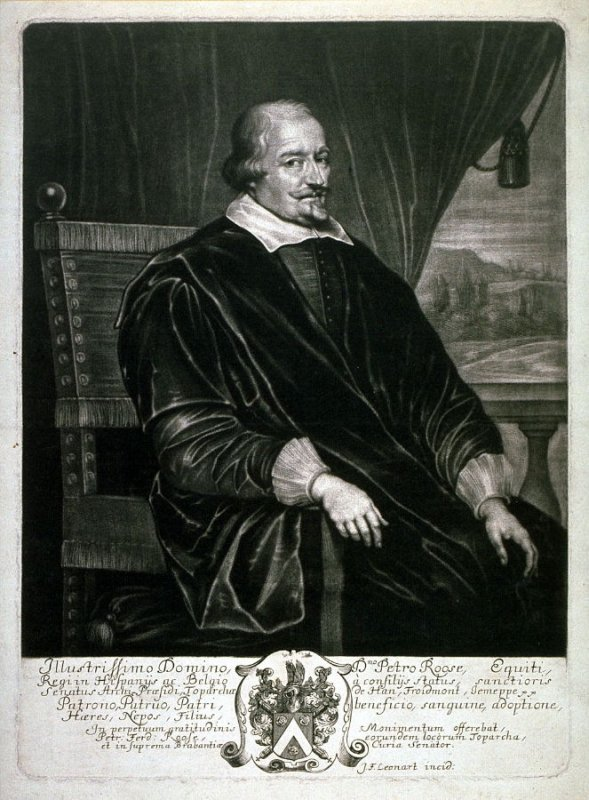
- Portrait of Pieter Roose, engraved by Johann Friedrich Leonart after a painting attributed to Anthony van Dyck

President of the Privy Council
- In office 1632–1653
- Monarch: Philip IV of Spain
- Governors General: Cardinal-Infante Ferdinand of Austria (1633–1641); Francisco de Melo (1641–1644); Marquis of Castel Rodrigo (1644–1647); Archduke Leopold Wilhelm of Austria (1647–1656)
- Preceded by: Engelbert Maes
- Succeeded by: Charles de Hovyne

Personal details
- Born: 1585 or 1586 Antwerp
- Died: 27 February 1673 City of Brussels
- Resting place: Church of St Gudula, Brussels
- Parent(s): Johan Roose and Maria van Kinschot
- Education: civil law
- Alma mater: Leuven University

Pieter Roose (1585 or 1586 – 27 February 1673), lord of Froidmont, Han and Jemeppe, was president of the Privy Council from 1632 to 1653, and a key actor in the government of the Habsburg Netherlands for over twenty years.

== Career ==
He was born in Antwerp as the son of Johan (or Jan) Roose and Maria van Kinschot. His brother, also called Jan Roose, would later be a mayor of Antwerp. After studying civil law at Leuven University, Roose started a legal practice in Brussels. On 18 March 1616 he was appointed advocate fiscal of the Council of Brabant. On 8 May 1622 he became a member and master of requests of the Privy Council. In 1624, when the customs of the city of Mons were being codified, he was deputized by the Privy Council to safeguard the rights of the prince in the resulting publication. In 1627 he was sent to the Franche-Comté to troubleshoot corruption in the county's salt works.

In 1628 Roose was sent to Spain, where Philip IV of Spain appointed him a councillor of state on 14 January 1630, and in December of the same year a member of the Supreme Council of Flanders. In 1632 Roose returned to Brussels to replace Engelbert Maes as president of the Privy Council. He effectively became civilian head of government in Brussels, despite the rivalry for preeminence with Ferdinand van Boisschot, chancellor of Brabant.

== Downfall ==
Roose was a close friend of Cornelius Jansen. After Pope Urban VIII condemned Jansen's work Augustinus (1640), Roose opposed publication of the papal bull in the Habsburg Netherlands. This contributed to his fall from favour under Archduke Leopold Wilhelm of Austria (governor general 1647–1656). In 1649 he was sent to Regensburg to congratulate Emperor Ferdinand III on his son's election as King of the Romans. He was replaced as president of the Privy Council by Charles de Hovyne on 23 December 1653.

Roose died on 27 February 1673 and was buried on 14 March in the Chapel of the Blessed Sacrament of the Miracle of the Church of St. Michael and St. Gudula (now Brussels' cathedral).
