= Léon-Jean de Paepe =

President of the Privy Council of the Habsburg Netherlands
- In office 1672–1684
- Monarch: Charles II of Spain
- Preceded by: Charles de Hovyne
- Succeeded by: Pierre-François Blondel

Personal details
- Died: 8 August 1685
- Spouse: Elisabeth van Langenhove
- Children: Pierre-Martin
- Profession: lawyer

Léon-Jean de Paepe (1610–1685), lord of Glabbeek, was an officeholder and statesman in the Spanish Netherlands. After serving on the Council of Brabant in Brussels and on the Supreme Council of Flanders in Madrid, De Paepe was appointed president of the Privy Council of the Habsburg Netherlands in 1674. He died on 8 August 1685.

His son Gilles-Dominique married Catherine de Brouchoven, daughter of Helena Fourment.

== Works ==
De Paepe was the author of a manuscript treatise on the Joyous Entry entitled Remarques sur la joyeuse entrée de S.M. comme duc de Brabant.
