= Estates General of 1600 =

Parliamentary assembly of representatives

Estates General États Généraux (French) / Staten Generaal (Dutch)
- Estates of the realm First Estate of prelates Second Estate of nobility Third Estate of chief cities

History
- Established: 28 April 1600
- Disbanded: 9 November 1600
- Preceded by: Estates General of 1598
- Succeeded by: Estates General of 1632

The Estates General of 1600 was a parliamentary assembly of representatives of the constituent provinces of the Habsburg Netherlands.

It was the first, and only, estates general of the Netherlands convened under the authority of the Archdukes Albert and Isabella, who arrived in the Low Countries in 1599 as the new sovereigns, Philip II of Spain having bequeathed his territories in the Low Countries to his daughter Isabella as dowry upon her marriage to Albert.

The Estates General were summoned to recognise the sovereign authority of the Archdukes, and to raise taxes to pursue the war with the Dutch rebels.

== Delegates ==
The delegates attending were as follows.

Delegation	Prelates	Nobles	Third Estate (Representatives of the cities)
Duchy of Brabant	*Mathias Hovius, Archbishop of Mechelen; *Ghisbertus Masius, Bishop of 's-Hertogenbosch; *Guillaume de Berghes, Bishop of Antwerp; *Libert Schalon, prelate of Vlierbeek Abbey; *Robert Herion, prelate of Villers Abbey; *Dionysius Feyten, prelate of St. Michael's Abbey, Antwerp; *Philip de Rouwergen, prelate of Grimbergen Abbey; *Nicholas Mutsarts, prelate of Tongerlo Abbey; *Franciscus van Vlierden, prelate of Park Abbey; *Jean Braze, prelate of Heylissem Abbey; *Lieven de Couwenberghe, prelate of Dieleghem Abbey; *Arnout van Eynhouts, prelate of St Gertrude	*Charles III de Croÿ, Duke of Aarschot and Prince of Chimay; *Philip William, Prince of Orange, Count of Nassau, Baron of Breda, Diest, etc. *Charles de Ligne, Prince of Arenberg; *Gerald de Hornes, 1st Count of Bassignies, Baron of Boxtel; *Jacques de Berghes, Baron of Grimbergen; *Lancelot Schetz de Grobbendonck, Baron of Wezemaal; *Philippe, Lord of Rubempré; *Adriaan de Gavre, lord of Aiseau	*Richard Van Pulle, knight, mayor of Leuven; *Willem Willems, pensionary of Leuven; *Henri de Dongelberge, knight, mayor of Brussels; *Anthoine Vander Hert, alderman of Brussels; *Gilles van Busleyden, knight, alderman of Brussels; *Charles de Lathem, lord of Court St-Etienne, treasurer of Brussels; *Gille Martigny, pensionary of Brussels; *Jacob Dassa, knight, mayor of Antwerp; *Blasius de Bejar, knight, alderman *Hendrik van Halmale, knight, alderman *Henri Schotti, pensionary of Antwerp; *Arnout van Breugel, first alderman of 's-Hertogenbosch; *Willem van Reys, pensionary of 's-Hertogenbosch; *Philippe Maes, clerk of the States of Brabant
Duchy of Limburg			*Jean de Berlaymont, lord of Chappelle; *Jean Colyn, lord of Boesdaele; *Jean Vander Hoeff, dict Verlieren; *Herman Schuyl, bailiff of Balen; *Wannier Hannot, mayor of Herve; *Wouter Hoen Van Hoensbroeck, lord of Geule; *Frederick de Schaesberg; *Julius Schaesberg, licentiate of laws *Martin Monen, alderman of Meerssen; *Winant van Amstenrode, lord of Mecht; *Guillaume Fronteau; *Franciscus van Eynatten, lord of Margraten; Jan van Ottegraven, bailiff of Simpelveld
Duchy of Luxembourg	*Benedict, prelate of Notre-Dame à Munster; *Remacle, prelate of Orval Abbey	*Thierry, Count of Manderscheidt; *Godfroid d'Elz, lord of Elz, Walmeranges and Clervaux	Eucharius Bock, doctor of laws, lieutenant-provost of Luxembourg; *Philippe Dronckman, doctor of laws, alderman and pensionary of the city of Luxembourg; *Gille de Geneppe, mayor of Marche
Duchy of Guelders		*Arnold-Adrien de Bylande, baron of Rheidt, lord of Brempt and Cruchten; *Philippe de Bentinck, lord of Biecht, Papenhoven, etc., drossard of Montfort; *Godart de Boicholt, lord of Boicholt and Cottersum	*Jan van Breugel, mayor of Roermond; *Gerard Craeyart, licentiate of laws, alderman of Roermond; *Godart Byl the Younger, mayor of Venlo; *Gerard Lintgens, mayor of Geldern; *Reynier de Rysewyck, licentiate of laws, pensionary of Geldern
County of Flanders	*Petrus Simons, bishop of Ypres; *Cornelius Columbanus Vrancx, abbot of St. Peter's Abbey, Ghent; *Jean Bouchier, abbot of St. Andrew's Abbey, Bruges; *Franciscus Schouteet, abbot of Drongen Abbey; *Adriaan Vorens, archdeacon of St Bavo's Cathedral, Ghent; *Jean-Baptiste Bate, archdeacon of St. Salvator's Cathedral, Bruges		*Anthoine Triest, second alderman of Ghent; *Gilbert van Kortewille, knight, third alderman of Ghent; *Jan-Baptiste Schorman, pensionary of Ghent; *Mathias Dagna, alderman of Bruges; *Jacques de Jonge, alderman of Bruges; *Jean-Baptiste Van Belle, pensionary of Bruges; *François de Hallewyn, knight, advocate of Ypres; *Hercules Willard, alderman of Ypres; *Henri Codt, licentiate of laws, pensionary and clerk of Ypres; *Jean de Groote, lord of Nieuwland, hereditary marshal of Flanders, mayor of the commune of Franc of Bruges; *Thomas Grammaye, mayor of the aldermen of Franc of Bruges; *Adriaan Bailly, licentiate of laws, pensionary of the Franc of Bruges
County of Artois	*Mathieu Moulart, bishop of Arras; *Philippe de Caverel, abbot of St Vaast; *Jean du Ploich, dean of Saint-Omer Cathedral	*Adrien de Noyelles, knight, lord of Marles, baron of Rossignol, governor and captain of Arras; *Gilles de Lens, baron of Aubigny, etc. *Jean de Bonnières, knight, baron of Aulchy	*Nicolas du Val, licentiate of laws, advocate of the Council of Artois; *Anthoine Le Merchier, mayor of Arras; *Adrien Doresmieux, first councillor of the city of Saint-Omer
County of Hainaut	*Gaspar, abbot of Hautmont; *Robert, abbot of Cambron Abbey	*Charles de Gavre, count of Beaurieu; *Baudry, baron of Roisin	*Philippe de Mont; *Jacques, lord of St.-Genoix; *Jean Amand, lord of Nouvelles; *Louis Laulduiers; *Philippe de Samme, pensionary of Mons; *Jean du Buisson, pensionary of the States of Hainaut
City of Valenciennes			*Nicolas de Rasoir, knight, provost of Valenciennes; *Nicolas de la Pierre, knight, lord of Aubry, etc. *Henri d'Outreman, former provost *Robert Rose, licentiate of laws, first councillor of the city
County of Namur	*Jacques Blaseus, Bishop of Namur; *Jean Vander Linden, licentiate of laws, clerk of the States of Namur	*Henry d'Yves, knight, lieutenant governor of the county *Guillaume de Carondelet, knight	*Philibert de Marbaiz, knight, mayor of Namur; *Pierre Hanart, alderman of Namur
Lille, Douai and Orchies			*Claude de Lannoy, knight *Pierre de Croix, lord of Bus; *Charles Petitpas, mayor *Walrant du Bois, knight, alderman *Denis de Guillebert, licentiate of laws, pensionary of Lille; *Robert de Carondelet, knight, chief alderman *Philippe de Broide, pensionary of Douai.
City of Tournai			*Louis Allegambe, knight, provost of Tournai; *Jacques Hacquart, knight, mayor of the aldermen of St-Brixe and Bruisle; *Jean Leclercq, first councillor of the city
Tournaisis	*Michel D'Esne, Bishop of Tournai; *Denis de Villiers, canon of Tournai cathedral	*George de Savary, lord of Warcoing, Petit-Preu, etc.	*Nicolas du Bois, licentiate of laws, councillor of the States of Tournaisis
City and lordship of Mechelen			*Nicholas Vander Lanen, knight, mayor of Mechelen; *Philippe Schooff, first alderman *Jean Vander Lanen, lord of Schriek and Grootlo, treasurer *Antoine Sucquet, first pensionary of Mechelen
