= Charles de Hovyne =

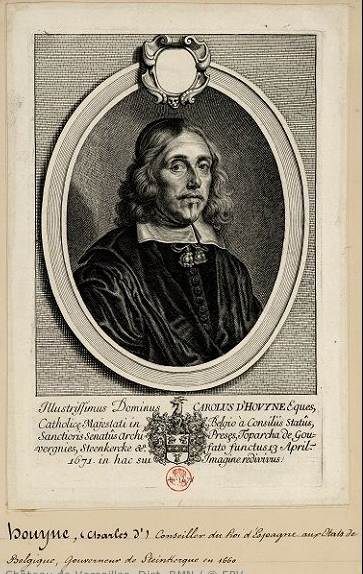

President of the Privy Council of the Habsburg Netherlands
- In office 1653–1671
- Monarchs: Philip IV of Spain (1621–1665), Charles II of Spain (1665–1700)
- Governor General: Archduke Leopold Wilhelm of Austria (1647–1656)
- Preceded by: Pieter Roose
- Succeeded by: Léon-Jean de Paepe

Personal details
- Born: 20 April 1596 (baptism) Tournai
- Died: 13 April 1671 (aged 74) Brussels
- Resting place: Chapel Church, Brussels
- Spouse: Marie de Gaule
- Children: Laurent de Hovyne, councillor of the Council of Brabant; Charles de Hovyne, chancellor of the University of Leuven
- Parent(s): Laurent de Hovyne, counsel to the States of Tournai
- Education: civil law
- Alma mater: Leuven University
- Profession: lawyer

Charles de Hovyne (1596–1671), lord of Gouvernies, Granbray, Winckel, Steenkercke, etc., was president of the Privy Council of the Habsburg Netherlands from 1653 to 1671, and a key participant in and commentator upon the government of the Habsburg Netherlands.

== Life ==
Charles de Hovyne, son of Laurent de Hovyne, counsel to the States of Tournai, was baptized in the church of St Jacques, Tournai, on 20 April 1596. After studying civil law at Leuven University, he became a barrister in pleas before the Great Council of Mechelen, and in 1628 a member of the court. In 1642 he became a privy councillor, and in 1647 a councillor of state. In 1653 he replaced Pieter Roose as president of the Privy Council.

He died in Brussels on 13 April 1671, and was buried in the Chapel Church, where a monumental tomb designed by Jan van Delen was erected.

He was married to Marie de Gaule with whom he had two sons: Laurent de Hovynes, who became a member of the Council of Brabant, and Charles de Hovyne, who became chancellor of Leuven University.

== Writings ==
For the benefit of the King of Spain, ruler of the Habsburg Netherlands, he composed a Mémoire touchant la forme du gouvernement politique des Pays-Bas, et des conseils et officiers qui en composent le ministère (Memorandum touching the form of political government of the Low Countries, and the councils and officers that make up the ministry). Several manuscript copies are preserved in the Royal Library of Belgium. At an unknown date (postulated variously to be 1623, 1662 or 1685) a modified version of this was published in Leiden by Abraham Gogar as Gouvernement politique des provinces des Pays-Bas sous l'obéissance de Sa Majesté Catholique (Political government of the provinces of the Low Countries under obedience to His Catholic Majesty).

Accusations of corruption and abuse of his office were levelled against Hovyne in 1664. While successful in his defence, he felt the court had not gone far enough in exonerating him. He therefore wrote a remonstrance to put his side of the case in full: Humble remonstrance et briefve déduction de Messire Charles Hovyne du Conseil d'Estat et chef-président du Conseil privé de Sa Majesté, printed in 1668 without specifying place or printer.
