= Church of Our Lady of the Chapel =

Church in Brussels, Belgium

- Église Notre-Dame-de-la-Chapelle (French); Onze-Lieve-Vrouw-ter-Kapellekerk (Dutch)
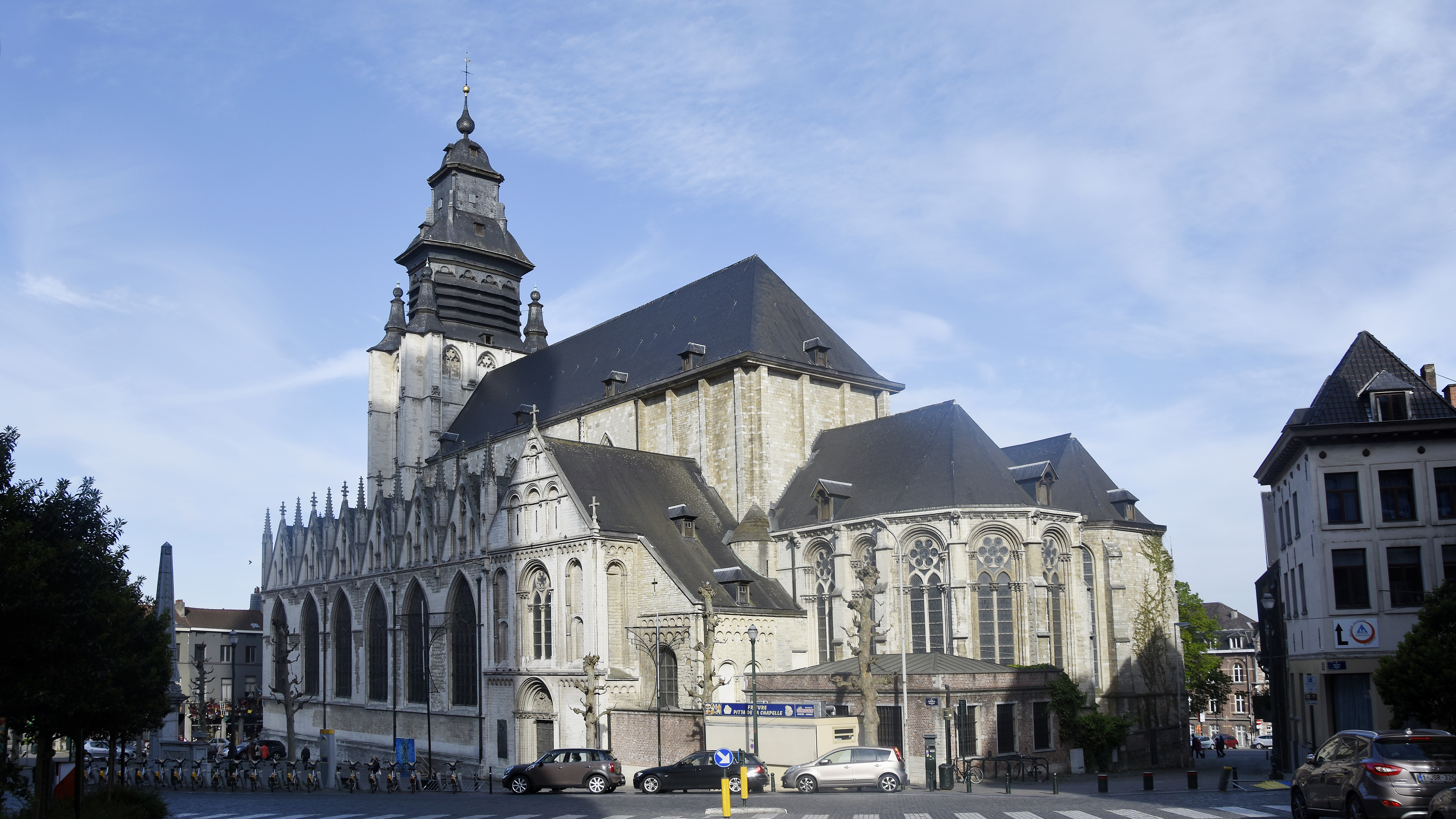
- Our Lady of the Chapel Church
- Church of Our Lady of the Chapel
- 50°50′30″N 4°21′04″E
- Location: Place de la Chapelle / Kapelleplein; 1000 City of Brussels, Brussels-Capital Region
- Country: Belgium
- Denomination: Catholic Church

History
- Status: Parish church
- Dedication: Our Lady of the Chapel

Architecture
- Functional status: Active
- Heritage designation: Protected
- Designated: 05/03/1936
- Architectural type: Church
- Style: Romanesque; Gothic; Brabantine Gothic; Baroque
- Years built: 12th–13th centuries
- Groundbreaking: c. 1210

Administration
- Archdiocese: Mechelen–Brussels

Clergy
- Archbishop: Luc Terlinden (Primate of Belgium)

The Church of Our Lady of the Chapel (French: Église Notre-Dame-de-la-Chapelle; Dutch: Onze-Lieve-Vrouw-ter-Kapellekerk), or the Chapel Church (French: Église de la Chapelle; Dutch: Kapellekerk), is a Catholic church in the Marolles/Marollen district of Brussels, Belgium. It is dedicated to Our Lady of the Chapel.

The church, in a Romanesque-Gothic transitional style, was built between the 12th and 13th centuries above an earlier chapel. Following a fire in 1405, its nave was rebuilt in the Brabantine Gothic style and enlarged with side chapels. Its Baroque slate bell tower dates from the 18th century. The complex was designated a historic monument in 1936.

The church is located on the Place de la Chapelle/Kapelleplein, between the Rue Haute/Hoogstraat and the Rue de la Chapelle/Kapellestraat.

== History ==
=== Early history ===
The presence of a chapel in this place is testified by a charter dated 1134 and signed by Godfrey I, Count of Louvain, in which he donated a chapel erected extra oppidum Bruxelli ("outside the fortified centre of Brussels") to the Benedictine monks of the Abbey of the Holy Sepulcher of Cambrai, who immediately founded a priory there. The monks' privileges were extended in 1195 by Henry I, Duke of Brabant, who designated the chapel as capella beatae Mariae extra muros oppidi Bruxellensis sita ("chapel of the blessed Mary outside the walls of Brussels"). These mentions of outside the walls are part of the elements that have led certain historians to consider the construction of Brussels' first city walls as having preceded the generally accepted period at the beginning of the 13th century.

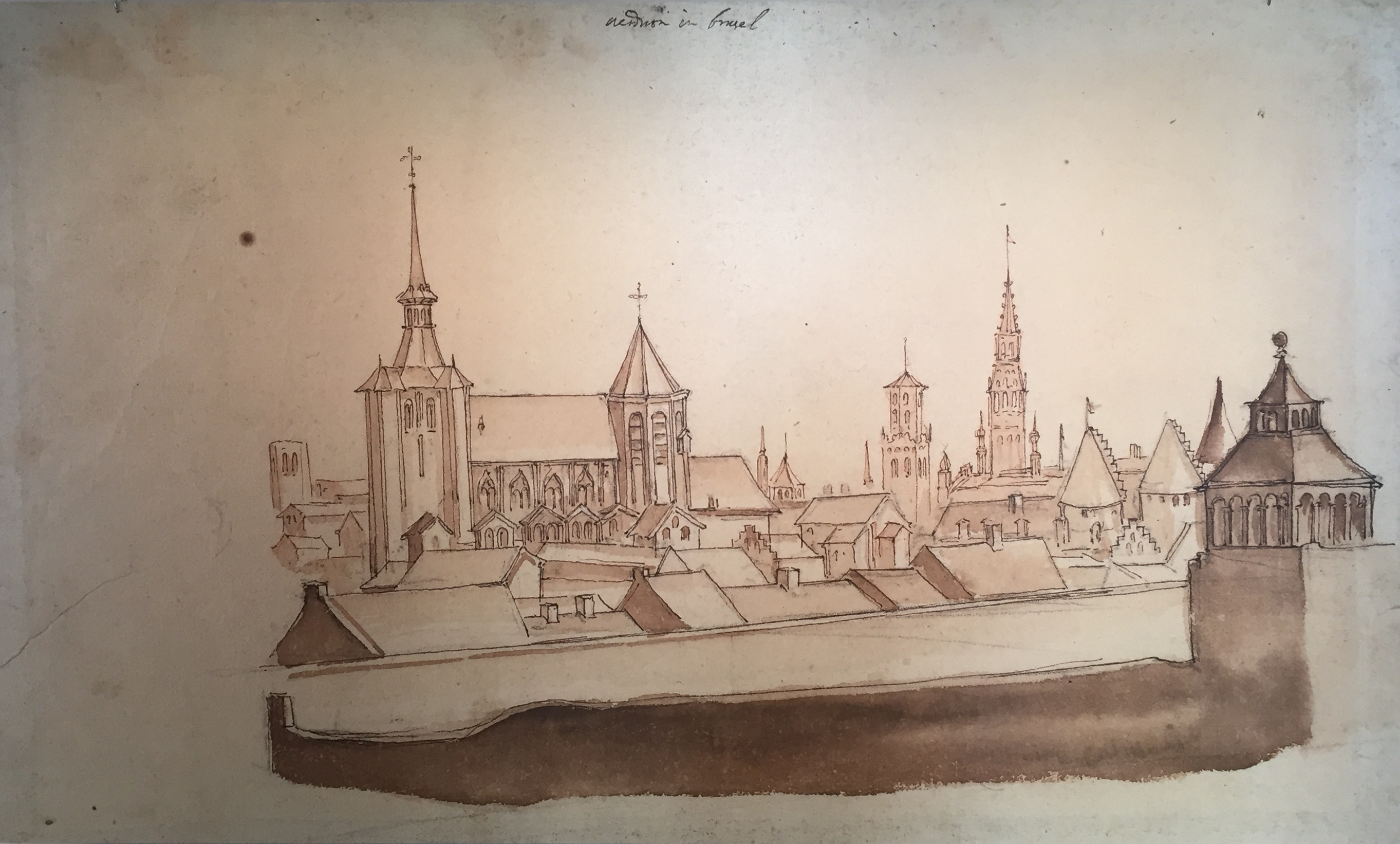
The Chapel Church, c. 1612, as drawn by Remigio Cantagallina. Note the spire, the crossing tower and the side aisle.

Nothing remains of the original chapel, which was probably under the choir of the current church, whose construction began around 1210 with a Romanesque nave. In parallel with the development of the neighbourhood outside the walls, it was enlarged and acquired the status of parish church (the second such church in the city), despite the opposition of the chapter of St. Gudula, very keen to keep the income granted to it as a mother church. The creation of this second parish indicates that, already at that time, a large population had settled along the old Roman road, which would become the Rue Haute/Hoogstraat, beyond the ramparts and the Steenpoort.

The southern part of the transept and the Chapel of the Holy Cross were built around 1215–1225 in a Romanesque-Gothic transitional style. They were followed by the northern part of the transept and its two chapels around 1250. The choir (1250–1275), perhaps the finest achievement of 13th-century architecture in Brussels, reflects a transitional style of French influence. The building was surmounted by a tower at the crossing of the transept and the nave. The work was completed in the course of the 13th century.

=== Damage and restoration ===
Dedicated to Our Lady, the church enjoyed significant success and a hesitant destiny. In 1405, a fire destroyed the non-vaulted parts, in particular the central nave, which was covered with a flat ceiling. The nave was rebuilt in the Brabantine Gothic style and enlarged with side chapels. In 1574, the church was ransacked by Calvinists who destroyed its furnishings. Reformed in 1579, it returned to Catholic worship in 1585. In 1695, part of the structure was damaged during the bombardment of Brussels by the French army as part of the War of the Grand Alliance. It was restored from 1699 to 1708. On that occasion, the spire of the west tower was replaced by the current Baroque slate bell tower, designed by the local architect Antoine Pastorana. In 1751, a sacristy was built to the south of the choir. The church closed in 1797, under the French regime, and reopened in 1803.

The church has been restored several times: starting in 1866, continuing in the 1930s, and again in 1989, during which time an archaeological reconstruction aimed at restoring the original state of the different building phases. It was designated a historic monument on 5 March 1936. Nowadays, it is the parish church of the Polish Catholic community in Brussels. In a side chapel, an icon of Our Lady of Częstochowa is venerated.

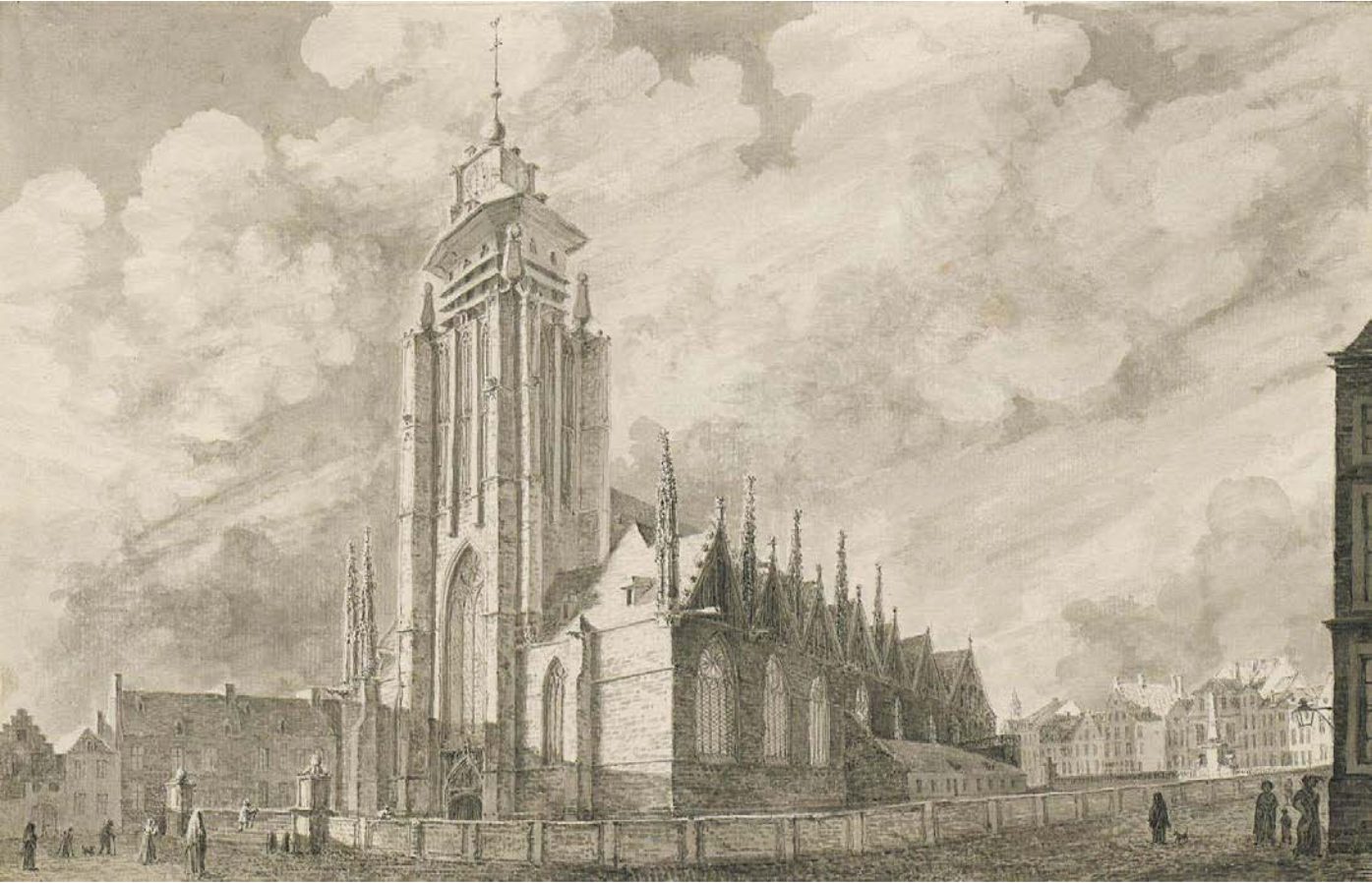
The Chapel Church in 1863, etching attributed to Émile Puttaert

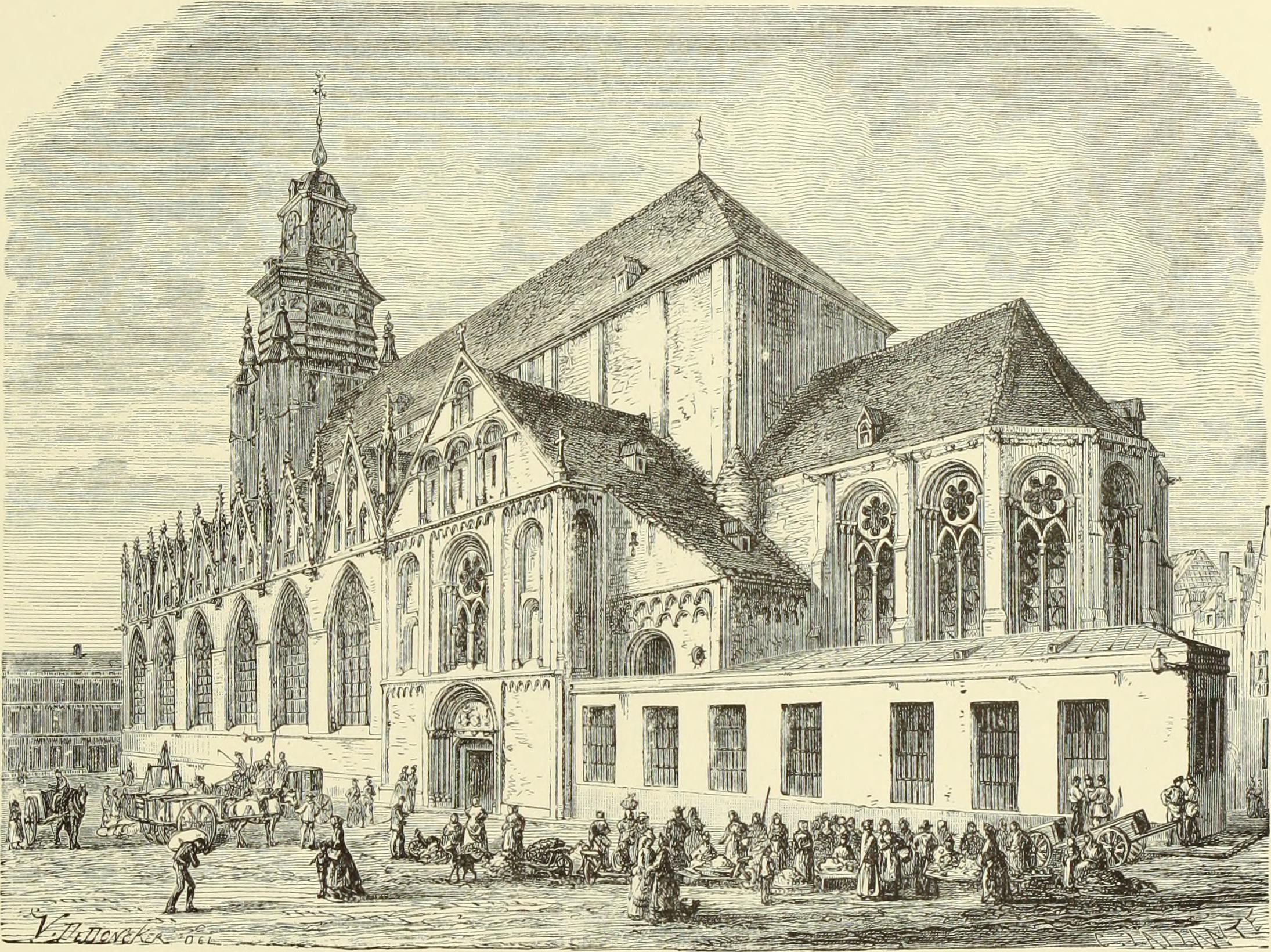
Rear view of the church in 1884 from Bruxelles à travers les âges

== Description ==
The Chapel Church has had a turbulent history made up of successive phases of partial destruction, fire, looting, shelling and rebuilding, alterations and restorations, making it a milestone in the transition from the Romanesque style to the Gothic (and more specifically to the Brabantine Gothic). It is traditionally listed, alongside the Cathedral of St. Michael and St. Gudula and the Church of Our Lady of Victories at the Sablon, as one of the three Gothic churches still standing in central Brussels.

The church is built of stone from the Gobertange quarry, which is located in present-day Walloon Brabant, approximately 45 km (28 mi) south-east of the church's site.

=== Exterior ===
From the first construction phase, at the beginning of the 13th century, the Romanesque transept and the bell tower are still preserved. The choir, from the second half of the 13th century, testifies to the first phase of Brabantine Gothic. The nave dates back to the 16th-century reconstruction, and is in the flamboyant Gothic style. On the sides, the slender pinnacles of the buttresses alternate with the series of triangular pediments. On the outside of the apse, there are also gargoyles.

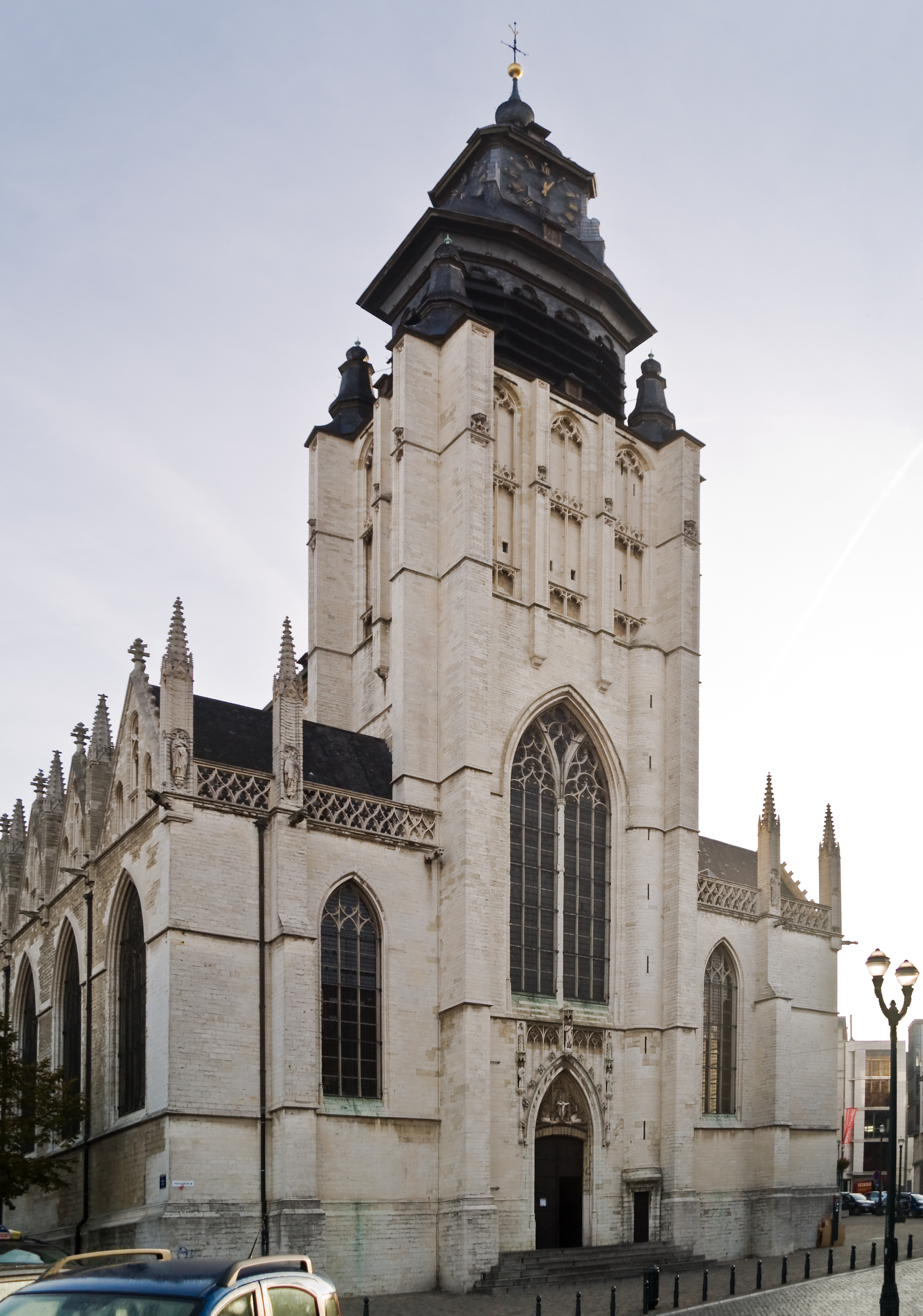
The bell tower and portal

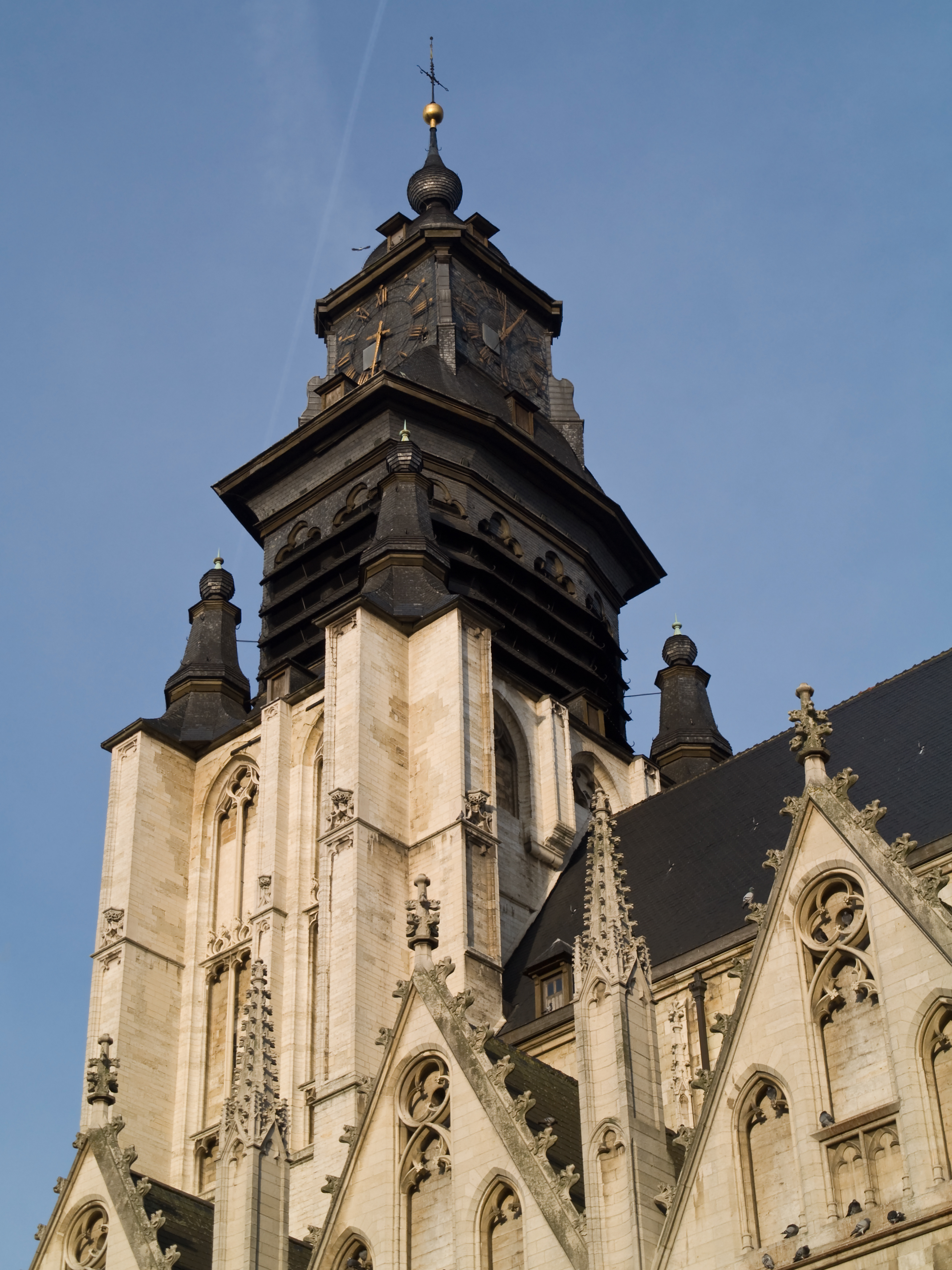
Closeup of the bell tower

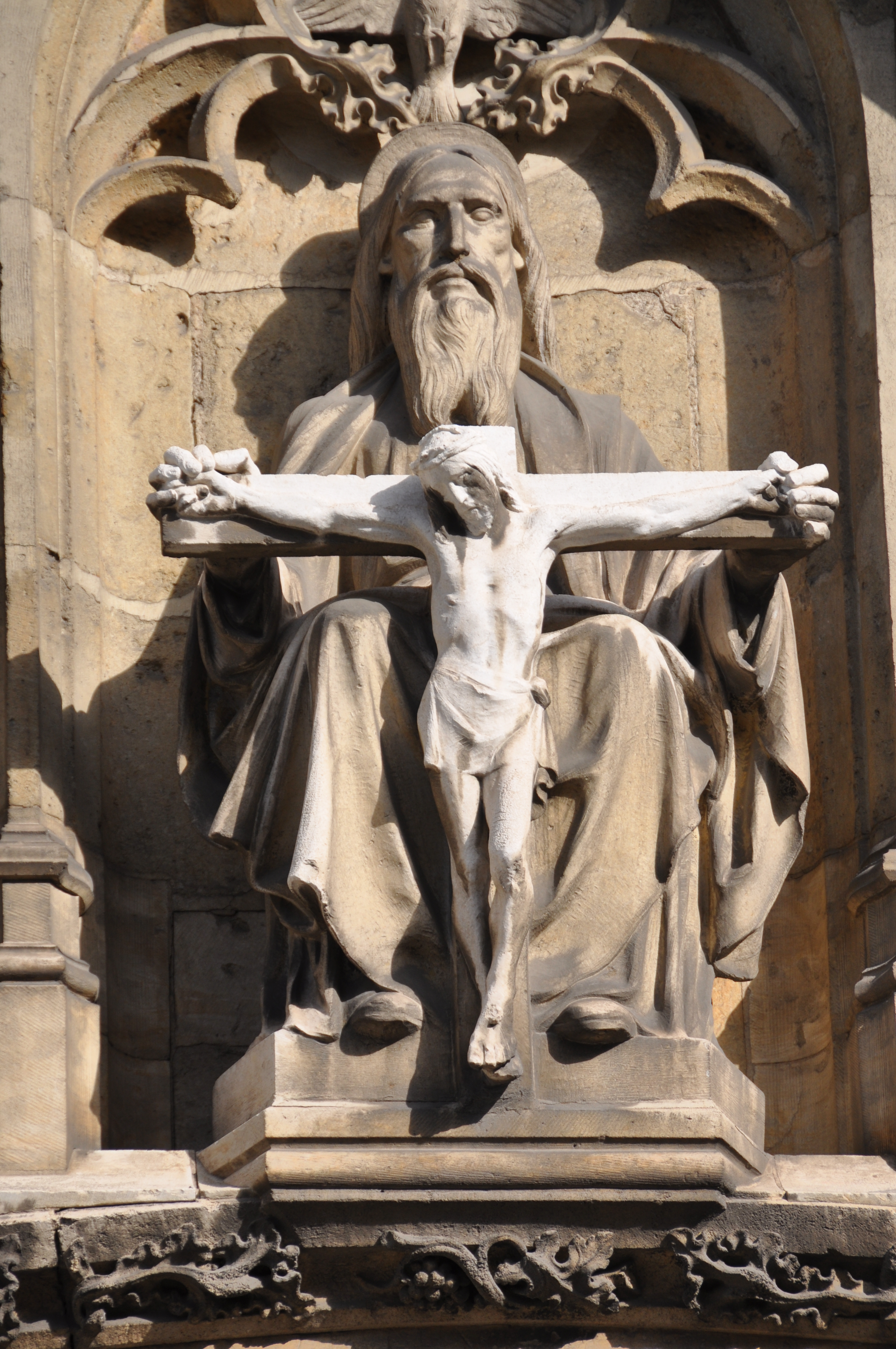
Statue of the Trinity (Throne of Mercy), above the portal

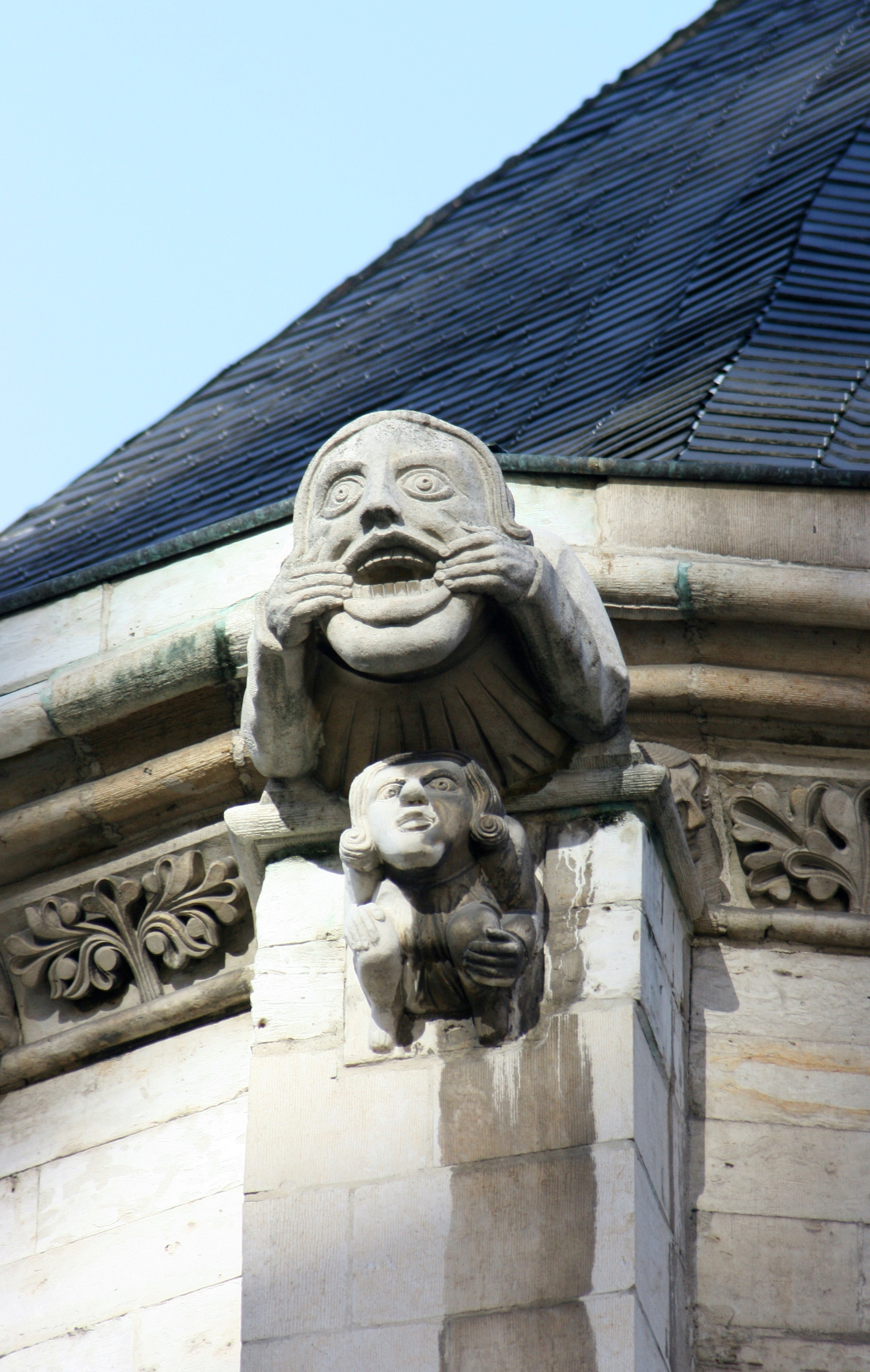
Gargoyle

=== Interior ===
The interior is striking for the contrast between the low, dark transept and choir, and the wide, airy nave. It contains sculptures by, among others, Jérôme Duquesnoy the Younger and Lucas Faydherbe, as well as a pulpit by Pierre-Denis Plumier. A modest funerary monument commemorates Pieter Brueghel the Elder, who was buried there in 1569. In the church hangs a copy of the painting Christ handing over the keys to Saint Peter (also known as The giving of the keys) by Peter Paul Rubens.

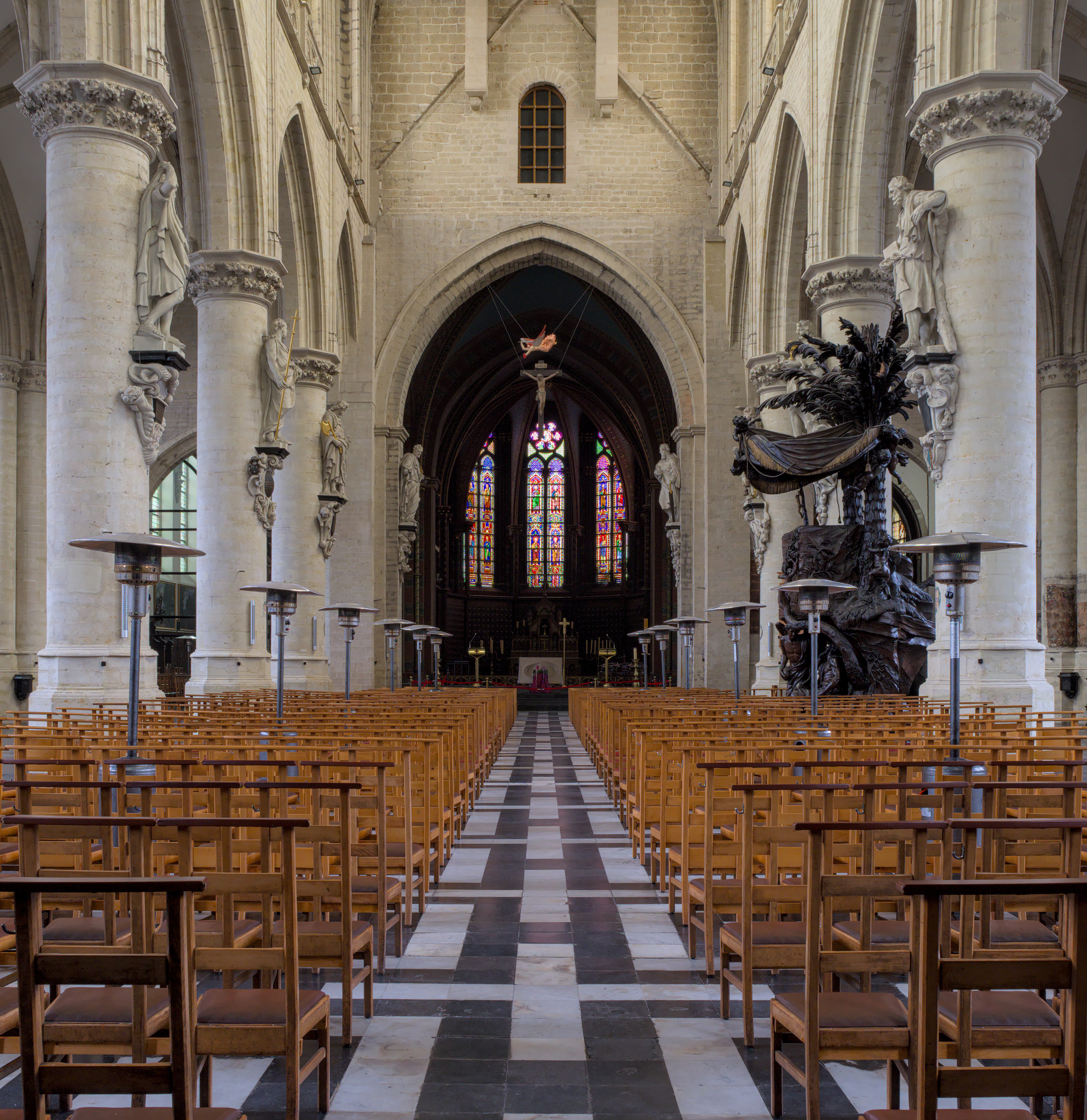
Central nave

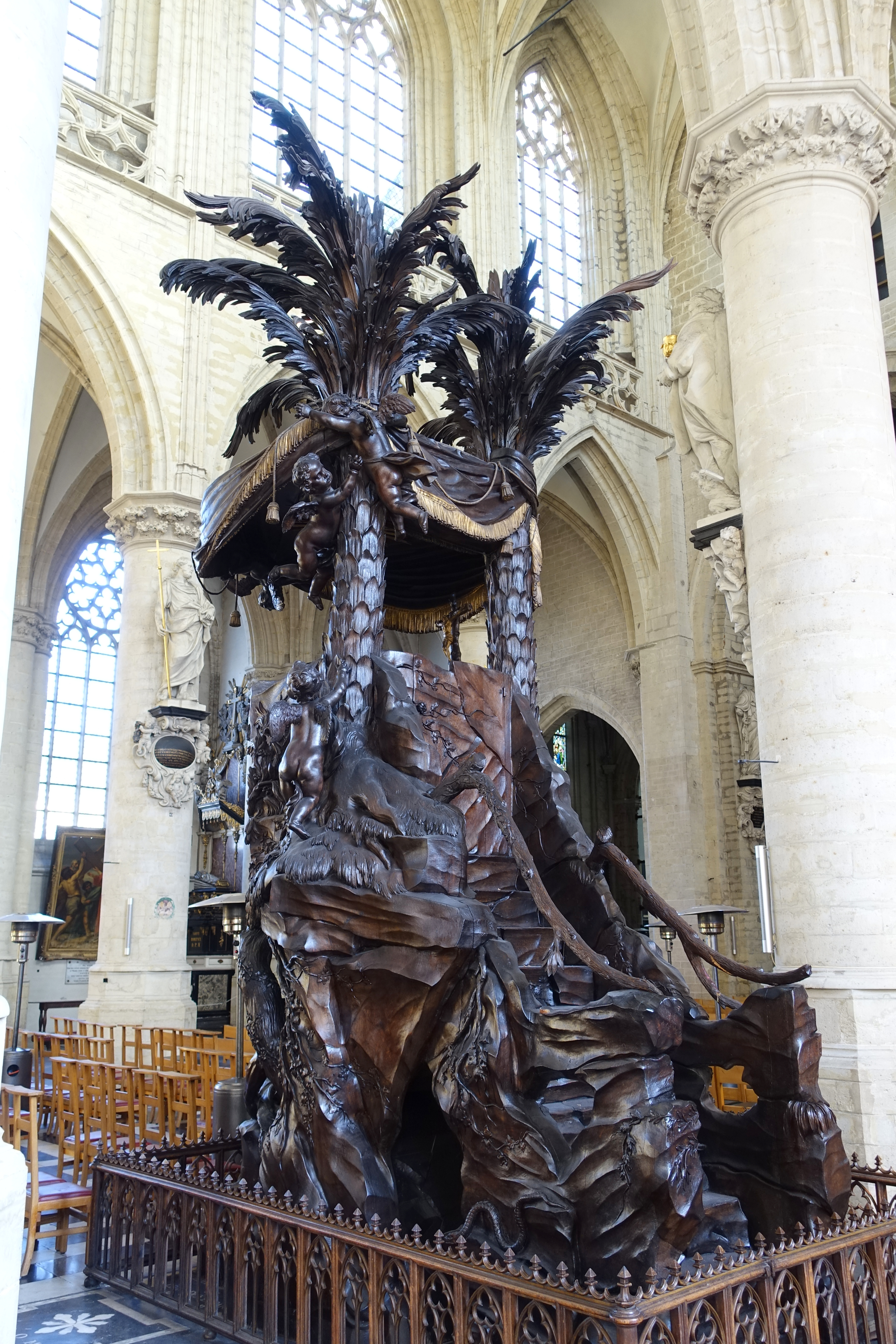
Pulpit

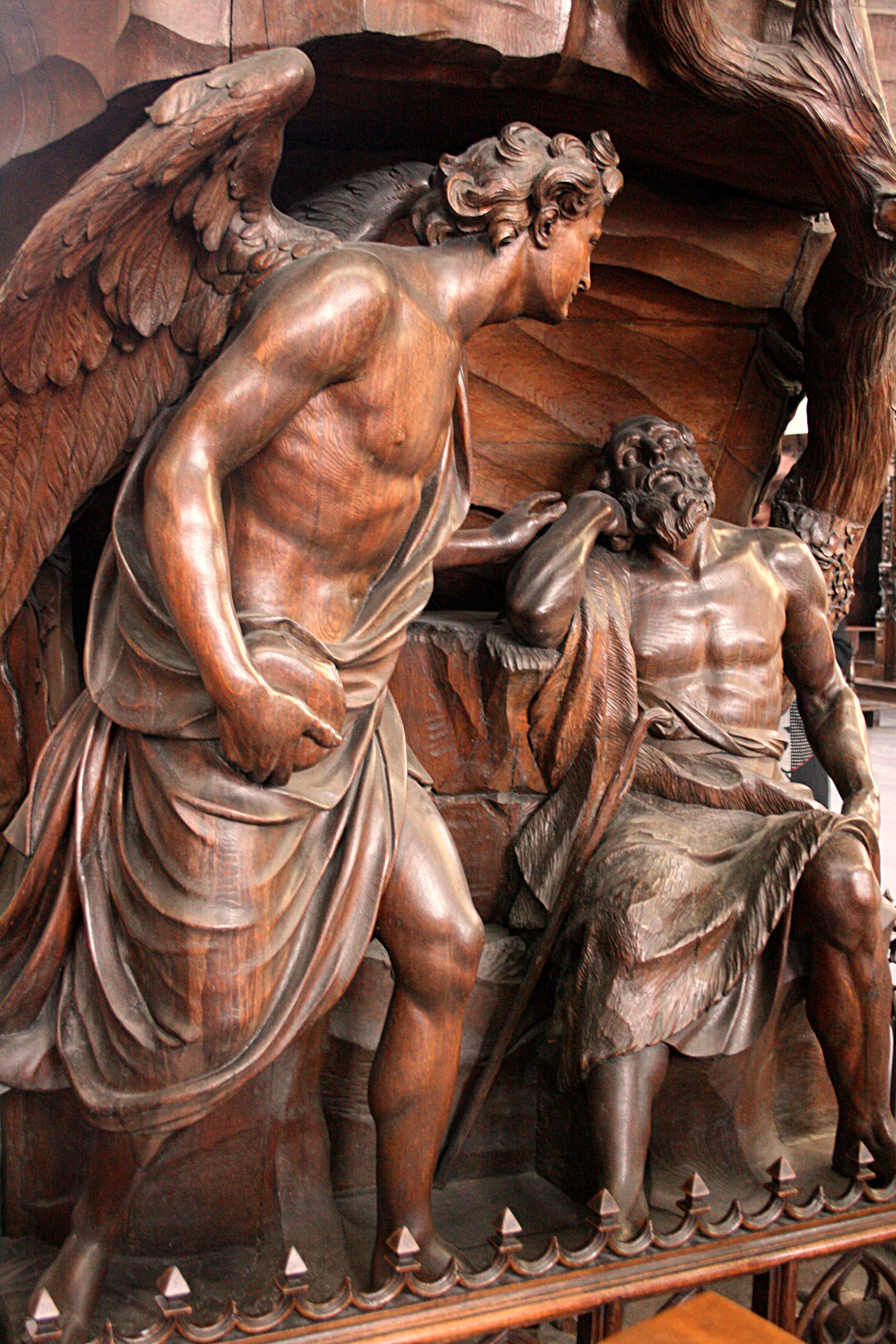
Detail of the pulpit

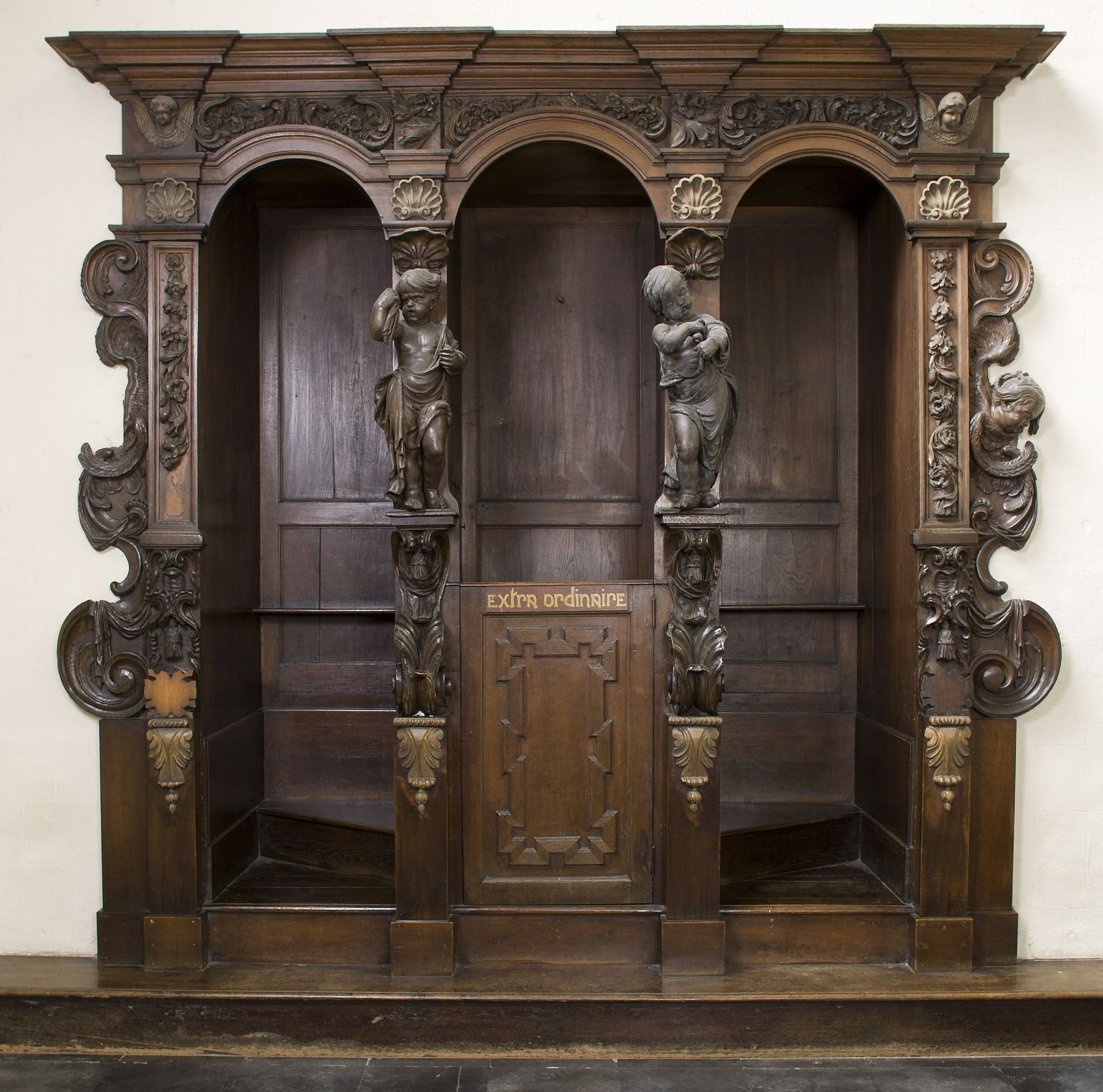
Confessional

== Burials ==
Throughout its history, the church has hosted the burials of great families and illustrious people, among which, in 1569, that of Pieter Bruegel the Elder, whose house is still on the Rue Haute. The funeral monument erected by his sons in his honour is still in place. Part of the relics of Saint Boniface of Brussels, Bishop of Lausanne, are also buried in the church. Other notables buried in there include Louis Verreycken and Charles de Hovyne.

== See also ==
- List of churches in Brussels
- Catholic Church in Belgium
- Brussels-Chapel railway station, a neighbouring station which takes its name from the church
- History of Brussels
- Culture of Belgium
- Belgium in the long nineteenth century
