= Pieter Damant =

Belgian clergyman and the third bishop of Ghent

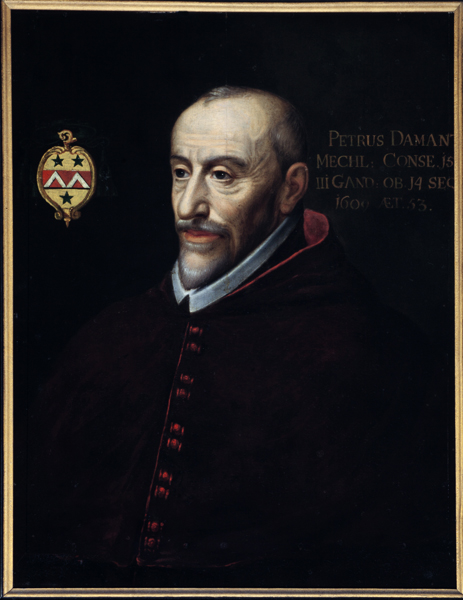
Portrait from Ghent Cathedral

Pieter Damant (1530–1609) was the third bishop of Ghent.

== Life ==
Damant was born in Mechelen in 1530. His father was a councillor and courtier to Charles V. He was elected dean of St Bavo's Cathedral, Ghent in 1585, and in 1589 was nominated bishop. He attended the provincial council for the archdiocese of Mechelen in 1607, and was making plans for his own diocesan synod when he died in Ghent in 1609. His monumental tomb survives in the cathedral.

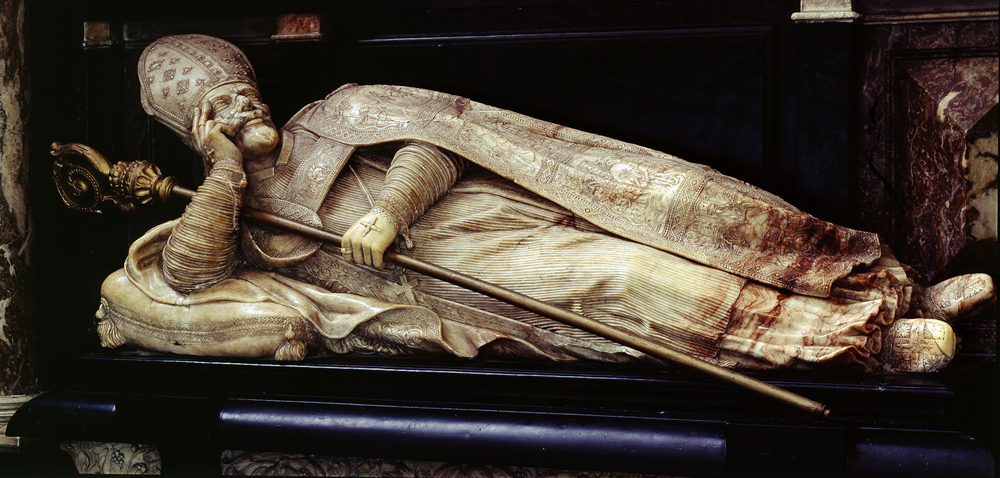
Damant monument
