= 1658 in Belgium =

- Decades: 1630s; 1650s
- See also: Other events of 1658; List of years in Belgium

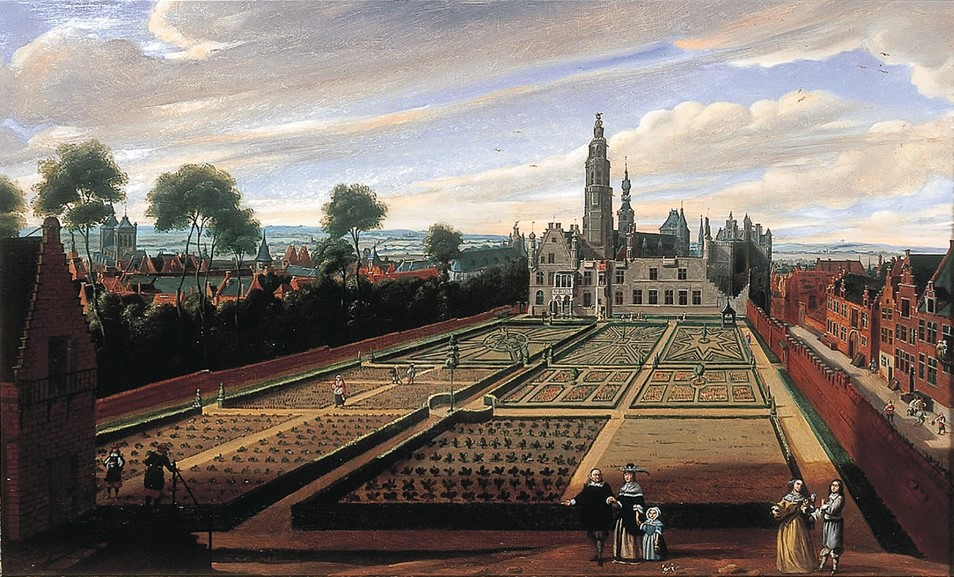
A painting of the Nassau Palace, Brussels, and its gardens by Guilliam van Schoor and Gillis van Tilborgh (c.1658)

Events in the year 1658 in the Spanish Netherlands and Prince-bishopric of Liège (predecessor states of modern Belgium).

== Incumbents ==
=== Habsburg Netherlands ===
Monarch – Philip IV, King of Spain and Duke of Brabant, of Luxembourg, etc.

Governor General – John of Austria the Younger

=== Prince-Bishopric of Liège ===
Prince-Bishop – Maximilian Henry of Bavaria

== Events ==
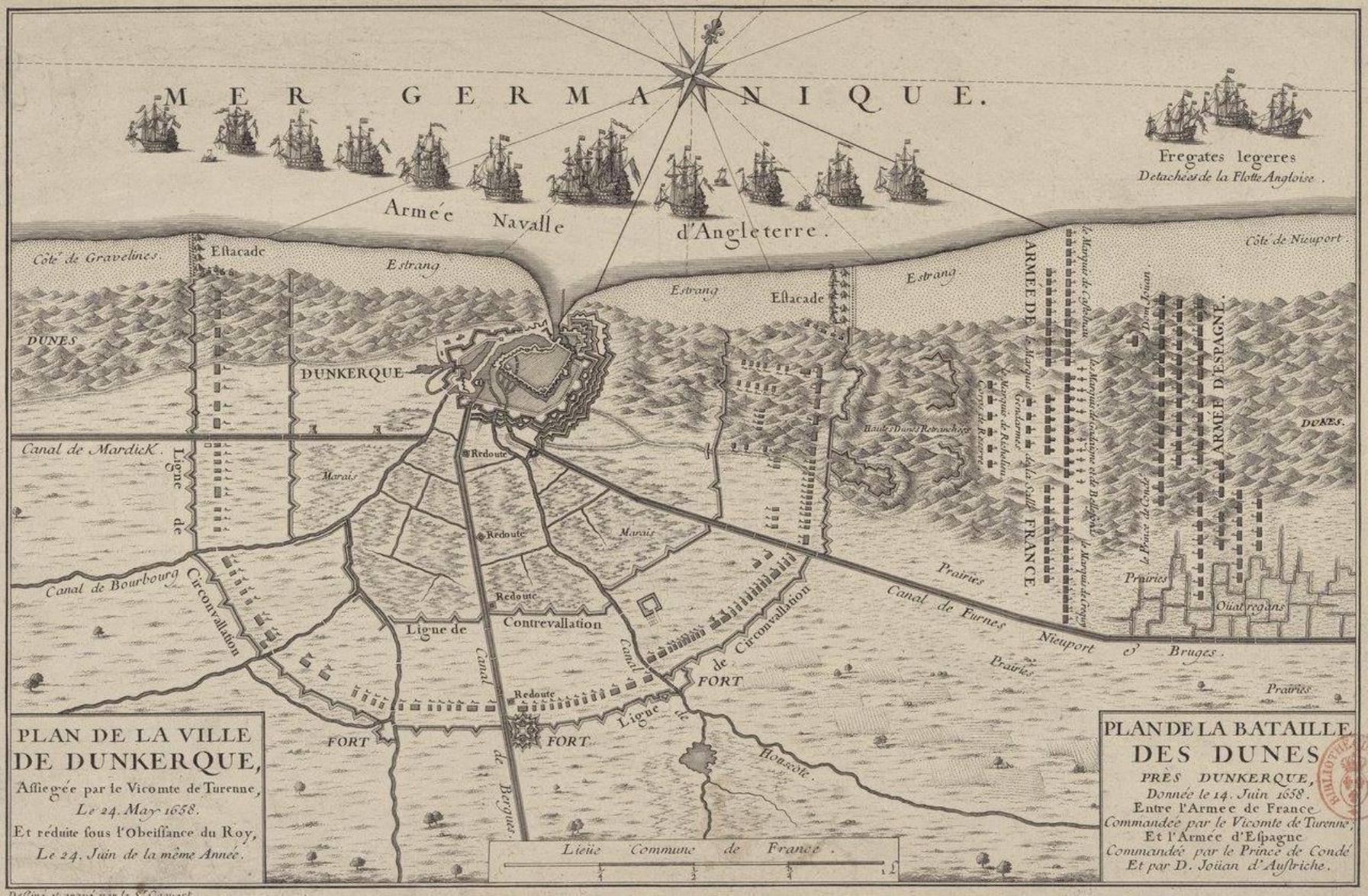
Siege of Dunkirk

- 25 May – Siege of Dunkirk begins
- 14 June – Battle of the Dunes
- 24 June – Fall of Dunkirk
- 28 June to 1 July – Siege of Bergues
- 7 November – Henry Taylor becomes Dean of Antwerp Cathedral

== Art and architecture ==
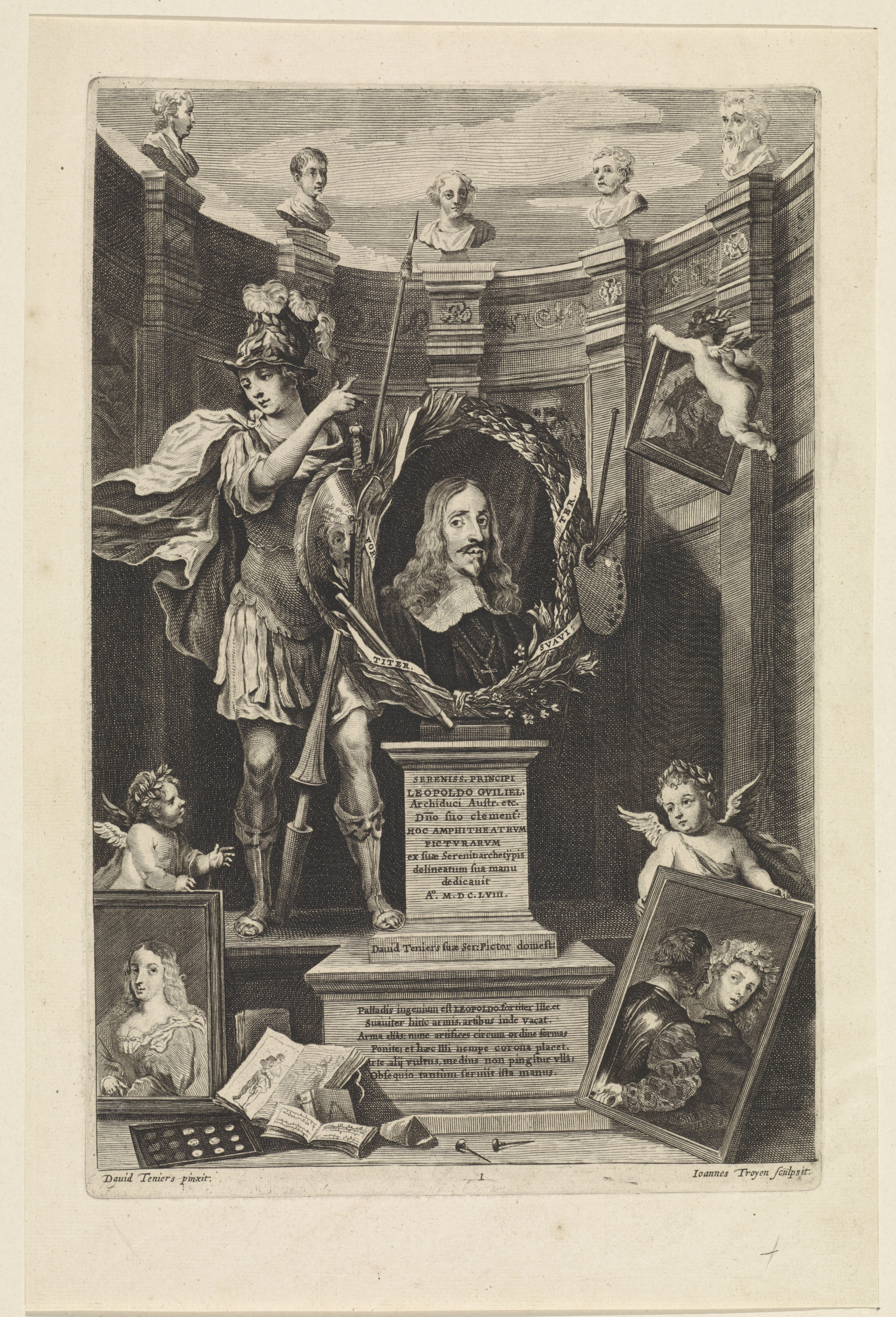
David Teniers, frontispiece of Theatrum Pictorium (dated 1658; published 1660), with a portrait of Leopold Wilhelm of Austria

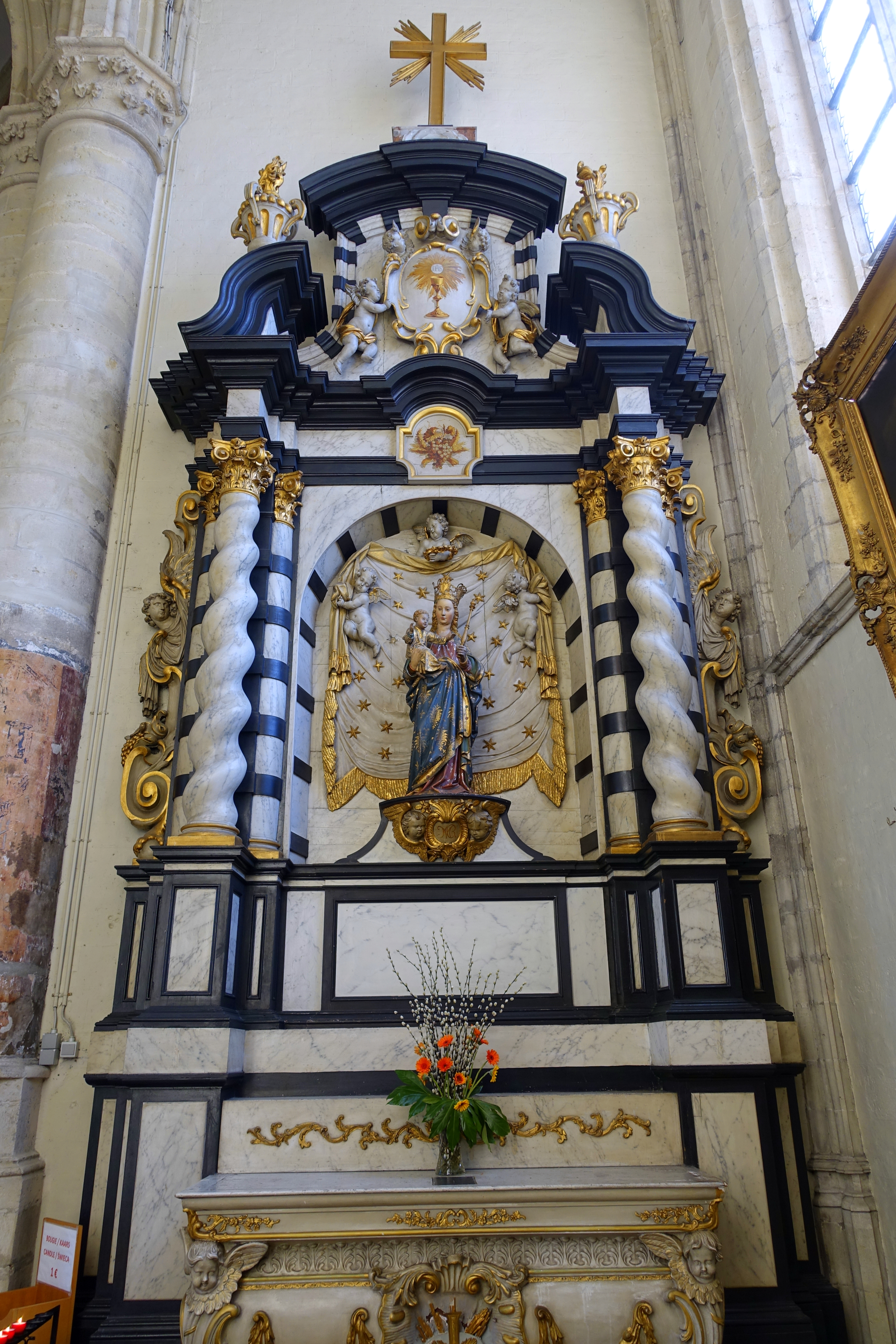
Baroque Altar of Our Lady in the Church of Our Lady of the Chapel in Brussels (1658)

- David Teniers the Younger designs the frontispiece of Theatrum Pictorium (published 1660)
- Baroque Altar of Our Lady in the Church of Our Lady of the Chapel in Brussels.

== Publications ==
- Nicolaus Breydel, Breviarium ofte Kort Begryp van het Leven vande H. Maghet en Martelaresse Barbara, besonder Patronesse vande Biechte, mitsgaders teghen de Peste ende onvoorsienighe doot (Ghent, Maximiliaan Graet)
- Pierre Marchant, Académie, ou exercitations spirituelles sur les trois dévotions principales practiquées en terre par la B.V. Marie, mère de Dieu (Ghent, widow of J. Vanden Kerchove).
- James Mumford, The Question of Questions, which rightly solved resolveth all our Questions in Religion (Ghent, Maximiliaan Graet)
- Juan de Palafox y Mendoza, Harders-brief en bekentenissen Van de goddelijcke genade, goetheyt en barmhertigheyt, translated by Lazarus Marcquis (Antwerp, Aernout van Brakel}
- Arnout Van Geluwe, Beghonnen Proces ofte Reden-Kamp-Stryt, tusschen Arnout Van Geluwe Vlaemschen Boer ende Joannes Maelgie, Ghereformeerden Predicant (Ghent, Maximiliaan Graet)
- Arnout Van Geluwe, Reden-Kamp-Stryt Tvsschen Eenen Vlaemschen Arendt ende een Hollandtsche Rave (Ghent, Maximiliaan Graet)

== Births ==
- 11 June – Victor Honoré Janssens, painter (died 1736)
- date uncertain — François Gaston Cuvelier, public administrator (died 1743)

== Deaths ==
- 15 January – John Colgan (born c.1592), Irish Franciscan
- 5 April – Jacobus Maestertius (born 1610), jurist
- 23 June – Guillaume de Bette, 1st Marquess of Lede (born c.1600), soldier
