= 1653 in Belgium =

- Decades: 1630s; 1650s
- See also: Other events of 1653; List of years in Belgium

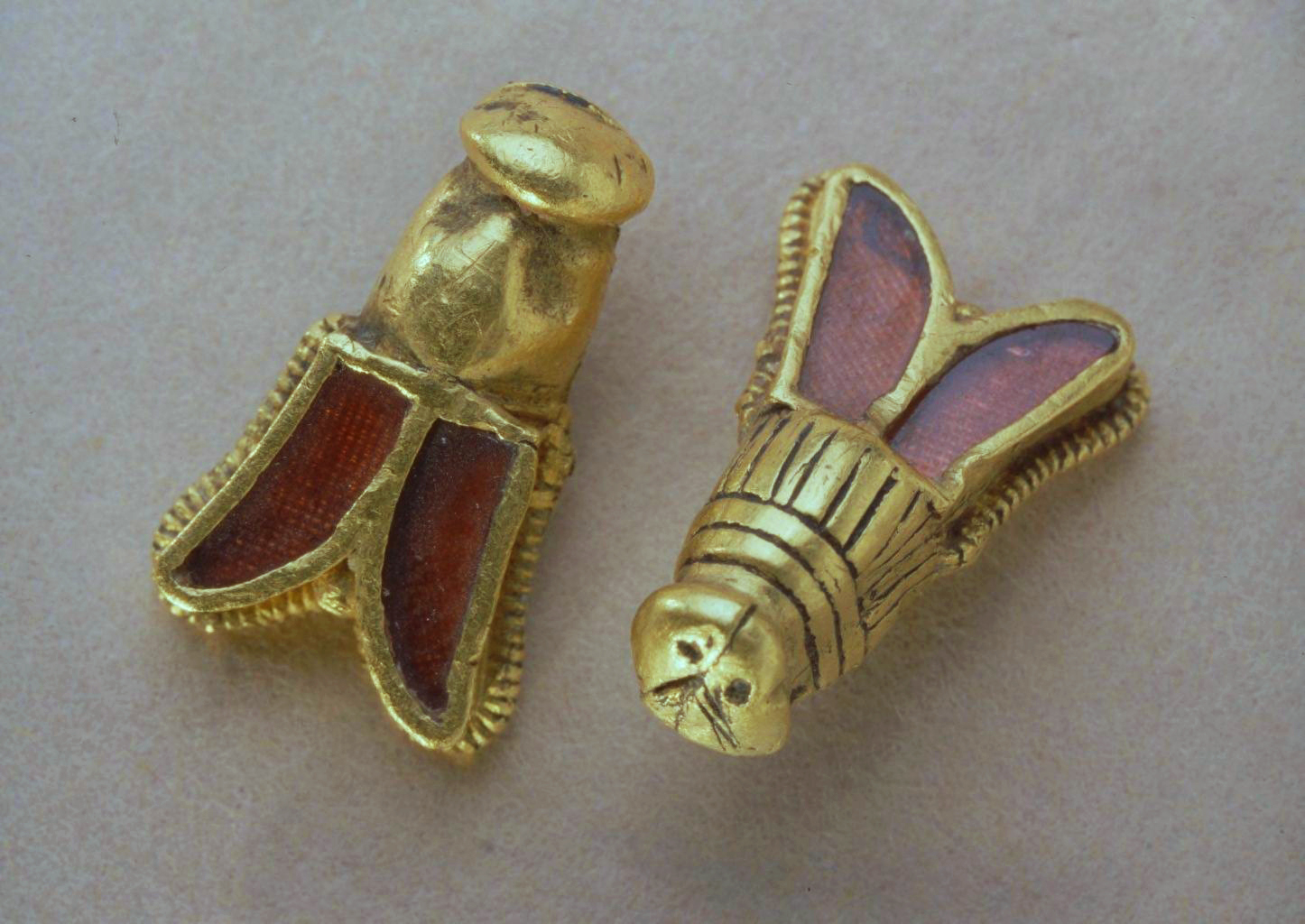
Golden bees from the tomb of Childeric I, excavated in 1653

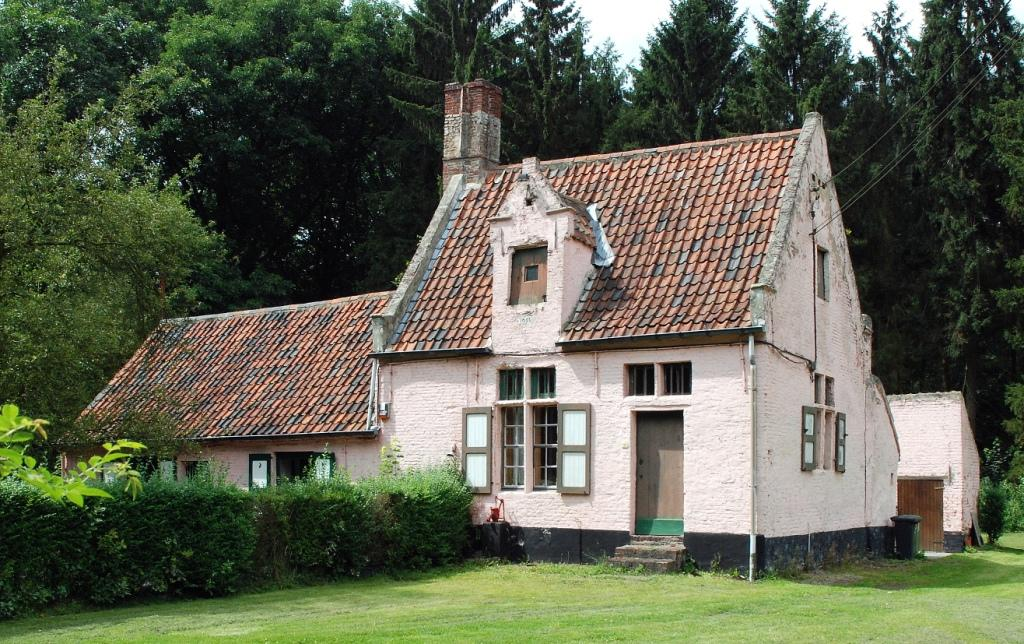
Farmhouse in Destelbergen with gable dated 1653

Events in the year 1653 in the Spanish Netherlands and Prince-bishopric of Liège (predecessor states of modern Belgium).

== Incumbents ==
=== Habsburg Netherlands ===
Monarch – Philip IV, King of Spain and Duke of Brabant, of Luxembourg, etc.

Governor General – Archduke Leopold Wilhelm of Austria

=== Prince-Bishopric of Liège ===
Prince-Bishop – Maximilian Henry of Bavaria

== Events ==
- 24 January – Prohibition on recruitment for foreign armies in Liège
- February – Prince of Condé invades the neutral Prince-Bishopric of Liège in support of Charles IV, Duke of Lorraine, sacking Couvin and Ciney
- 27 May – Discovery of the tomb of Childeric I near Tournai
- 31 May – Pope Innocent X's bull Cum occasione published in the Spanish Netherlands
- 4 July – Archduke Leopold Wilhelm of Austria prohibits soldiers from lodging with family instead of in their assigned quarters
- 7 July – Council of Guelders prohibits gypsies and vagrants from congregating around the pilgrimage site Kevelaer
- 11 August – Brussels Privy Council prohibits the exportation of grain to territory not under the control of friendly or neutral states
- 23 August – Brussels Privy Council permits the limited importation of English textiles through the ports of the County of Flanders for a period of four years
- 1 October – Orders in Liège to raise 500 cavalry and 1,000 infantry to guarantee the territory's neutrality
- 17 November – Departure times for the boat service between Liège and Huy published
- 17 December – Unlicensed exportation of arms, gunpowder, or other munitions of war from the city of Liège prohibited
- 23 December – Charles de Hovyne replaces Pieter Roose as president of the Brussels Privy Council

== Art and architecture ==
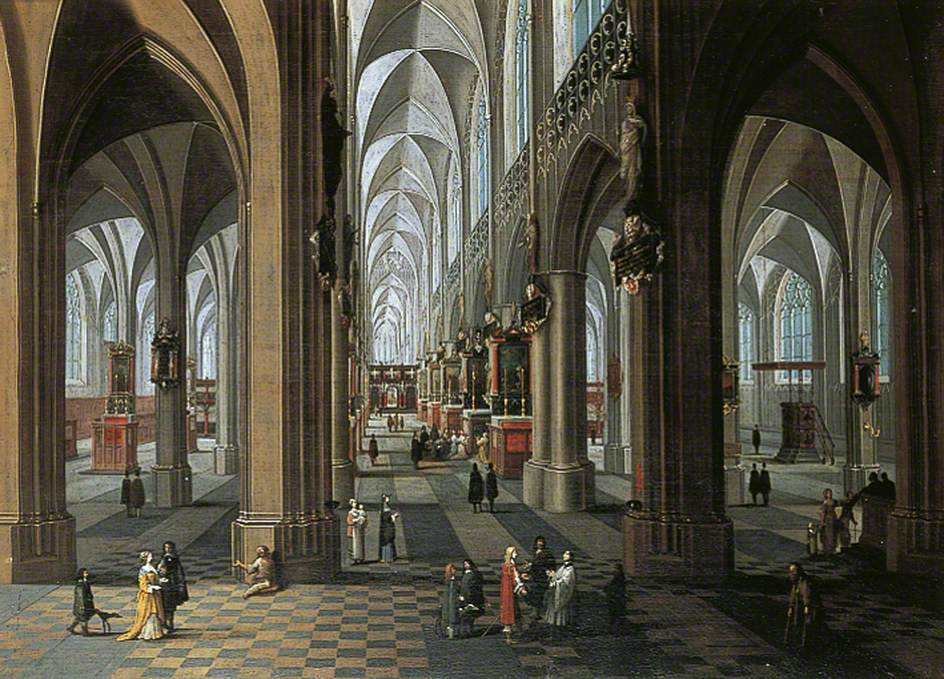
Pieter Neefs the Younger, Interior of Antwerp Cathedral (1653), now in Temple Newsam

Paintings

- Jacob Jordaens, The Banquet of Cleopatra
- Pieter Neefs the Younger, Interior of Antwerp Cathedral
- David Teniers the Younger, Gallery of Archduke Leopold Wilhelm in Brussels

Buildings

- Farmhouse in Destelbergen, now listed built heritage
- Tower of the Church of Our Lady, Alsemberg burns down

== Publications ==
- Jean Jacques Chifflet, Pulvis febrifugus orbis Americani
- Claude de Grieck, Liefde zonder zien verwekt, bly-spel (Brussels, Claudius de Grieck)
- Albertus Ignatius d'Hanins, Het bevel van Cupido (Brussels, Guillaume Scheybels)
- Libertus Fromondus, Brevis commentarius in Canticum canticorum (Leuven, Hieronymus Nempaeus)
- Jesuit College, Ghent, Tragedie Jephte, rechter des Volckx Israel (Ghent, Maximiliaan Graet)
- Pierre Marchant, Expositio mystico-litteralis SSmi. Incruenti sacrificii missae (Ghent, Alexander Sersanders)
- (Nuns of Oosteeklo Abbey), Institution de la Confrérie du méliflue docteur S. Bernard, signale favori de la Vierge-Mère, en l'abbaye d'Oost-Eecloo l'an M.DC.LIII (Ghent, Maximiliaan Graet)
- Livinus Vaentkens, Sancti Bernardi doctoris melliflui vitae medulla quinquaginta quatuor iconibus representata (Antwerp, Willem Lesteens and Engelbert Gymnicus)
- Michael van Langren, Description particuliere du grand changement que la sable ou banc de Mardyck a fait depuis l'an 1624 jusques au temps present 1653 (Brussels, François Schovardts)

Periodicals

- Relations veritables, edited by Pierre Hugonet (Brussels, printed by Guillaume Scheybels to be sold by Guillaume Hacquebaud)

== Births ==
- 28 January (baptism) – Joannes Chrysostomus Teniers, abbot (died 1709)
- 26 April – Jan Vaerman, mathematician (died 1731)

Date uncertain

- Artus Quellinus III, sculotor (died 1686)

== Deaths ==
- 1 February – Henricus Calenus (born 1583), clergyman
- 12 June – Ernestine of Arenberg (born 1589), noblewoman
- 4 September – Sidronius Hosschius (born 1596), Jesuit poet
- 16 October – Jan Wildens (born 1586), painter
- 19 October – Michel Routart (born c.1580), government official
- 28 October – Libert Froidmont (born 1587), theologian and scientist

Date uncertain

- Jan Dirven (born 1625), painter
- Antoon Faydherbe (active from 1598), sculptor
- Gillis Peeters the Elder (born 1612), painter
- Jan van Belcamp (born 1610), painter
