= 1651 in Belgium =

- Decades: 1630s; 1650s
- See also: Other events of 1651; List of years in Belgium

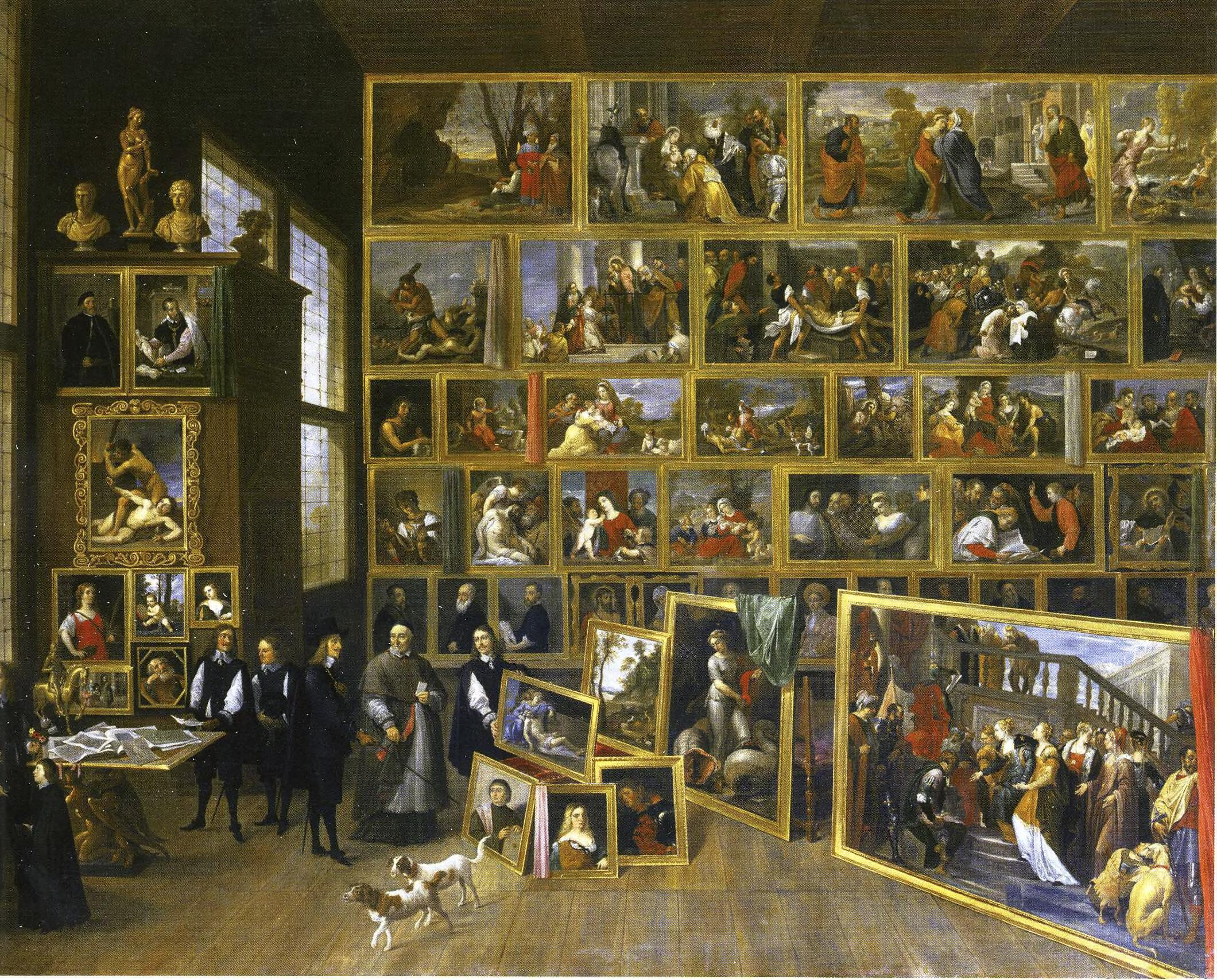
David Teniers the Younger, Gallery of Archduke Leopold Wilhelm in Brussels (1651) - now in Petworth House

Events in the year 1651 in the Spanish Netherlands and Prince-bishopric of Liège (predecessor states of modern Belgium).

== Incumbents ==
=== Habsburg Netherlands ===
Monarch – Philip IV, King of Spain and Duke of Brabant, of Luxembourg, etc.

Governor General – Archduke Leopold Wilhelm of Austria

=== Prince-Bishopric of Liège ===
Prince-Bishop – Maximilian Henry of Bavaria

== Events ==
- 23 January – Leopold William, as Captain-General of the Army of Flanders, prohibits all military governors, commanders or officers from levying any taxes or exactions on their own initiative.
- 3 February – Pierre de Bex, former mayor of Liège, arrested for conspiring against the state
- 22 February – Pierre de Bex, former mayor of Liège, executed in Liège
- 25 February – Amnesty for participants in Bex's insurrection published in Liège
- 28 February – Philip IV prohibits the dissemination or defence of the doctrines condemned by Pope Urban VIII in the 1642 bull In eminenti
- 20 March – Archduke Leopold Wilhelm of Austria lays the foundation stone of the new Capuchin church in Brussels, designed by Fr Charles of Brussels.
- 23 March – Brussels Privy Council issues a proclamation on behalf of Philip IV prohibiting his subjects from contributing to the building of Protestant churches in Dutch territory
- 27 March – Proclamation in Liège revaluing 16-sou coins at 12 sous and prohibiting foreign copper coins
- 12 May – City of Antwerp prohibits the auctioning of paintings by those not registered to the Guild of St Luke
- 26 May – Council of Brabant issues a decree regulating the production, distribution and consumption of aqua vitae in the Duchy of Brabant
- 17 July – Decree in Liège prohibiting recruitment for foreign armies
- 22 July – Decree giving foreign soldiers 24 hours to depart the territory of Liège
- 28 July – Council of Guelders prohibits taking service in foreign armies without permission
- 23 September – Prohibition on the exportation of grain from the Prince-Bishopric of Liège
- 8 October – City of Liège prohibits the sending of packets by the riverboat recently established in Maastricht rather than the two merchant boats already established in Liège
- 12 October – Maximilian Henry of Bavaria installed as Prince-Bishop of Liège
- 24 November – City of Liège issues regulations on hunting, fishing, and keeping pigeons
- 22 December – Prohibition in Liège of the making, selling or carrying of pocket-sized firearms or daggers

== Art and architecture ==
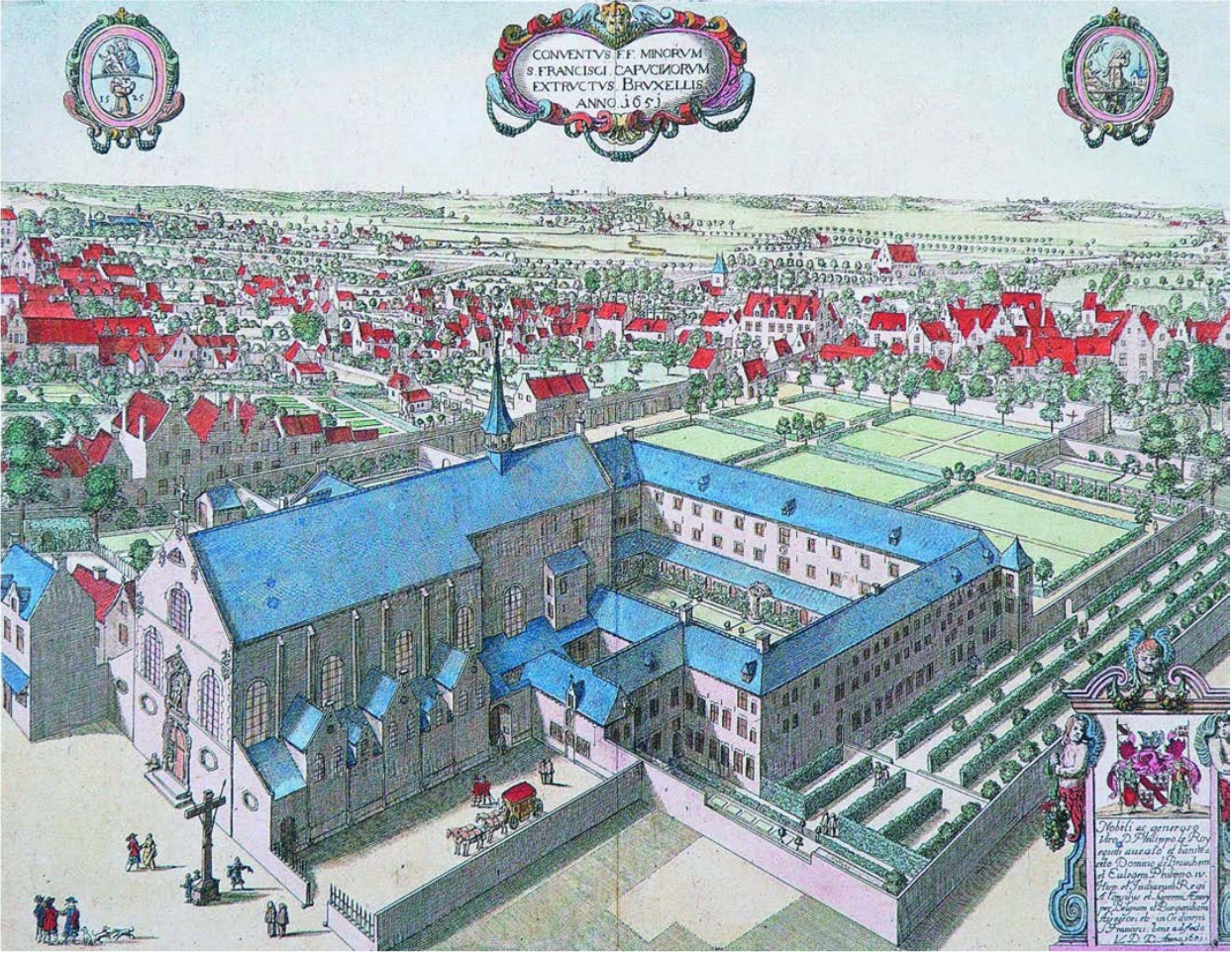
Capuchin priory and church in Brussels, begun in 1651 (1727)

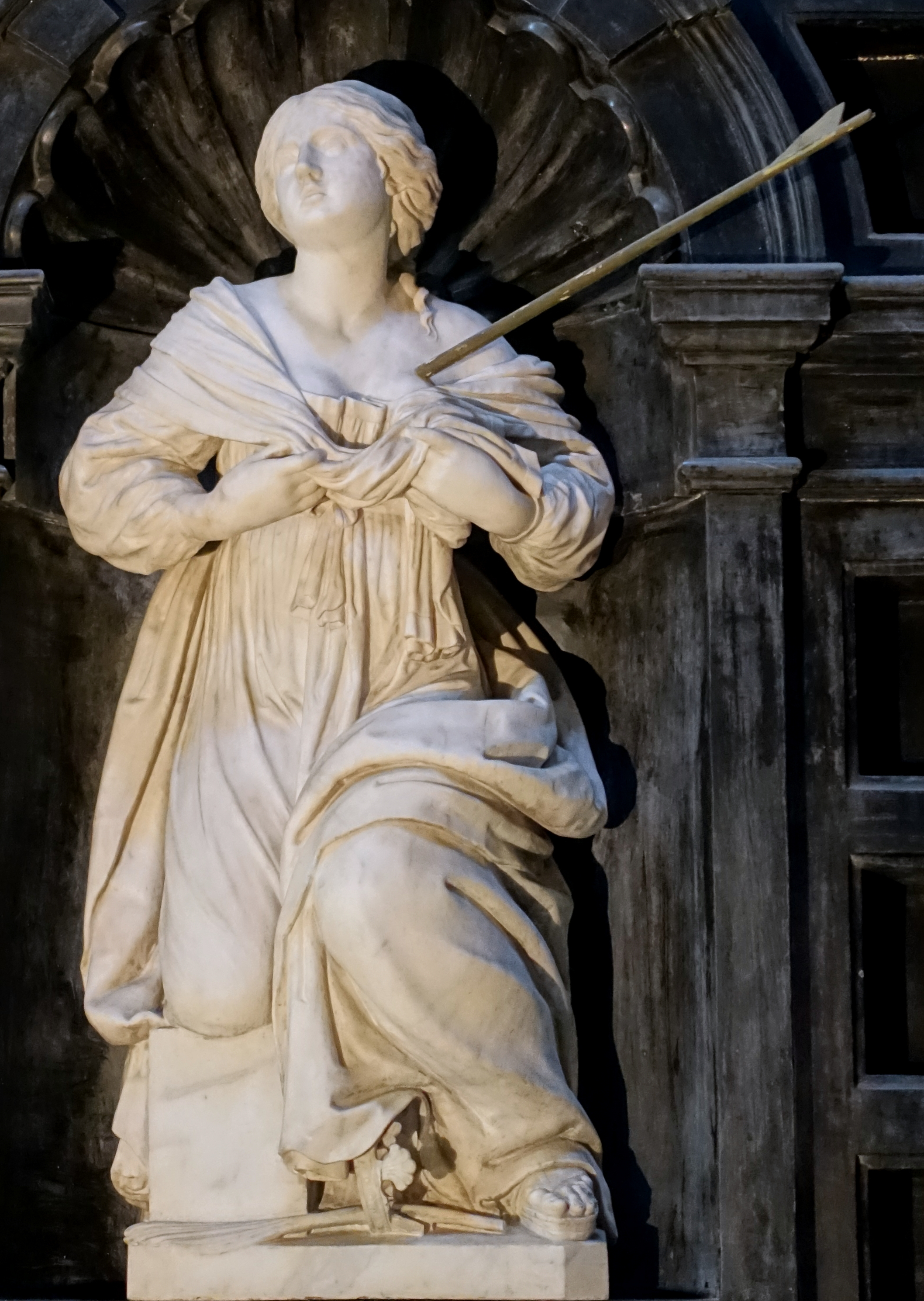
Jérôme Duquesnoy the Younger, Statue of St Ursula

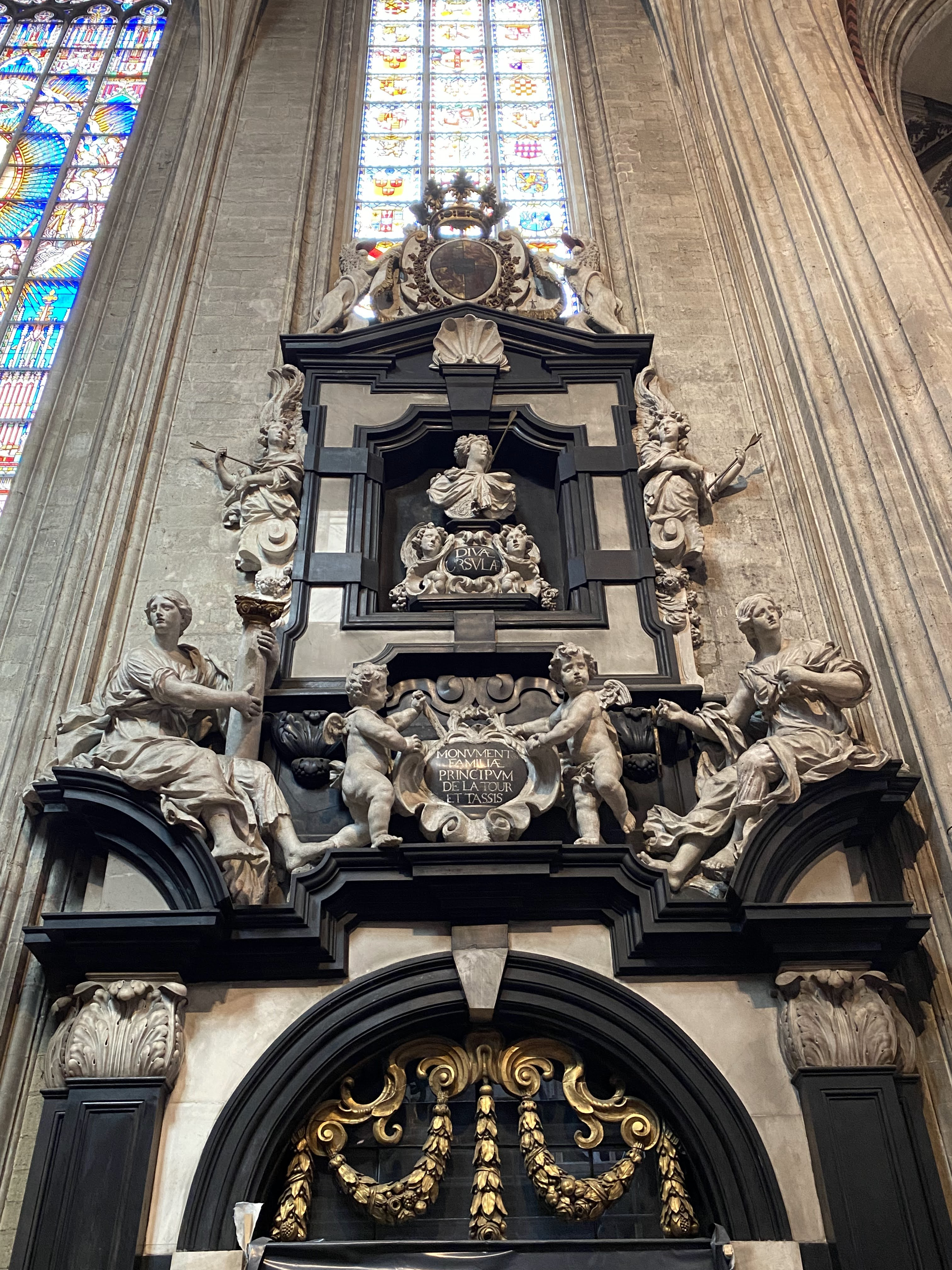
Thurn and Taxis family chapel in the Church of Our Lady of Victories at the Sablon

Buildings

- Work begins on a new Capuchin priory and church in Brussels.
- Work begins on the Thurn and Taxis family chapel in the Church of Our Lady of Victories at the Sablon

Sculptures

- Jérôme Duquesnoy the Younger, Statue of St Ursula

== Publications ==
- Abrégé des derniers mouvemens d'Angleterre (Antwerp, Jacobus Moens)
- Antoine Brun, Recueil du discours, fait par Monsieur de Brun, ambassadeur d'Espagne, a Messieurs les Estats generaux, en la grande assemblee le 28. mars 1651 (Antwerp, J. Husens)
- Jean-Jacques Chifflet, Judicium de fabula Joannae Papissae (Antwerp, Balthasar II Moretus
- Albert de Ligne, Prince of Barbançon, L'Amÿ véritable et loyal (Namur, J. Godefrin)
- (Jesuit College, Ghent), David en Ionathas voorbeelt van oprechte vrientschap (Ghent, Maximiliaan Graet) – programme for a school play performed in September 1651
- Pierre Marchant, Chronicon sive commissariorum nationalium nationis germanico-belgicae ordinis S. Francisci origo, institutio, potestas et auctoritas (Ghent, Jan Vanden Kerchove)
- Albert Rubens, Tabula chronologica regum dynastarum, vrbium rerum, virorumque illustrium a mundo condito ad annum 4000 (Antwerp, Cornelis Woons)
- Antonius Sanderus, Poemata: ad amplissimum et nobilissimum virum D. Franciscum Kinschotium, Brabantiae cancellarium (Leuven, Jan Vryenborch)
- Willem van der Borcht, Rosimunda (Brussels, Guilliam Scheybels)

Periodicals

- Relations veritables, edited by Pierre Hugonet (Brussels, printed by Guillaume Scheybels to be sold by Guillaume Hacquebaud)

== Births ==
- 21 February – Arnold van Westerhout, artist and printer (died 1725)
- 29 April (baptism) – Daniël van Vlierden, sculptor (died 1716)
- 18 August – François Noël, Jesuit missionary (died 1729)
- 25 August – François Baert, Bollandist (died 1719)

== Deaths ==
- 6 January (burial) – Jacob Franquart (born 1582/3), artist
- 14 January – Matthias Pauli (born 1580) Augustinian author
- 14 February – Lambertine de Ligne (born 1593), noblewoman
- 18 March – Gerard Seghers (born 1591), painter and art dealer
- 5 May – Frans I van Kinschot (born 1577), Chancellor of Brabant
- 9 May – Cornelis de Vos (born 1584), painter
- 30 May – Henri de Vicq, Lord of Meuleveldt (born 1573), diplomat and jurist
- 15 July – Engelbert Des Bois (born 1578), bishop of Namur
- 26 July – Hendrik van der Borcht the Elder (born 1583), engraver
- 8 September – Jacquemijntje Garniers (born c. 1590), midwife and painter
- 22 December – William Hyde (born 1597), priest and educator

Date uncertain

- Jan van den Hoecke, artist (born 1611)
