= 1657 in Belgium =

- Decades: 1630s; 1650s
- See also: Other events of 1657; List of years in Belgium

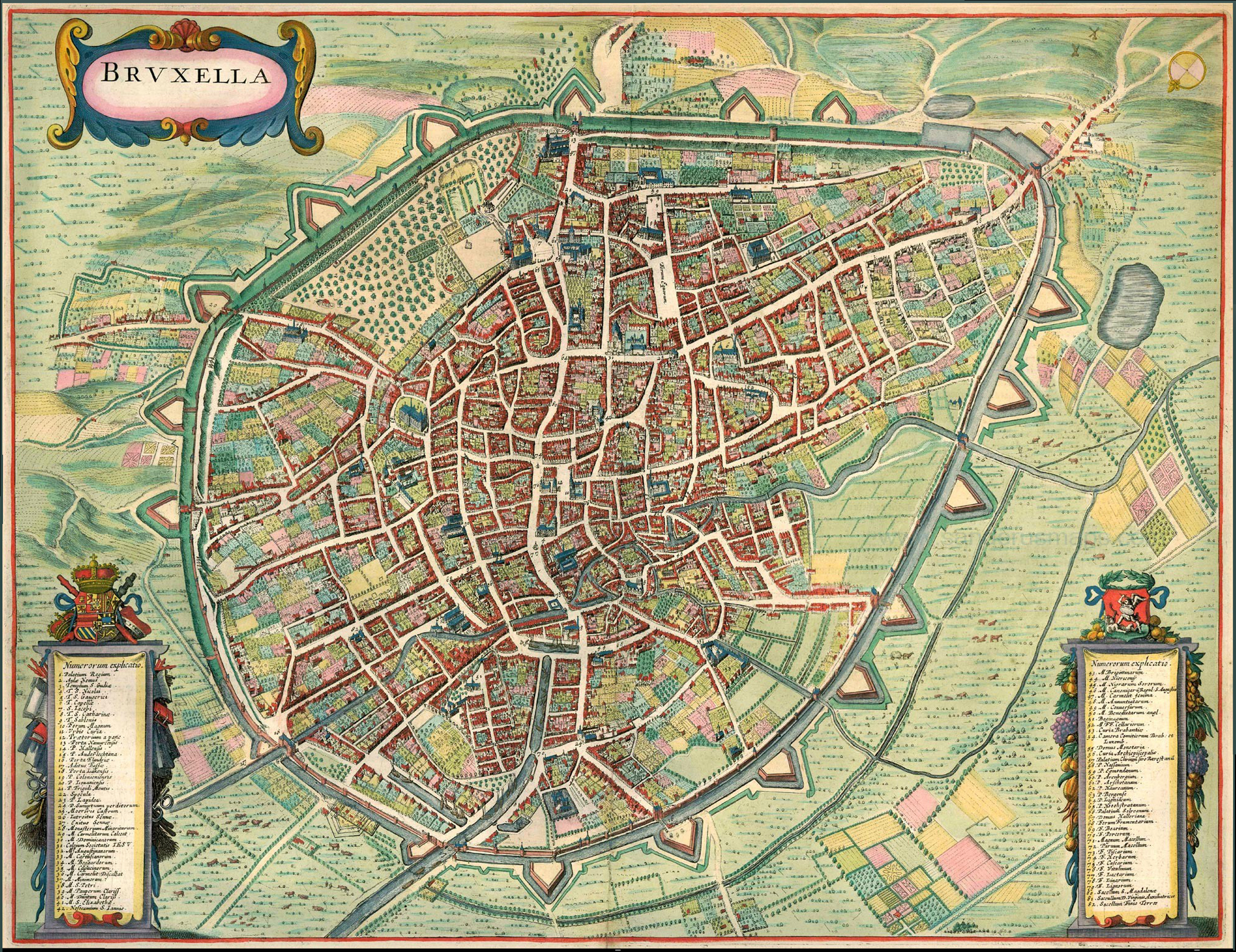
A map of Brussels (1657)

Events in the year 1657 in the Spanish Netherlands and Prince-bishopric of Liège (predecessor states of modern Belgium).

== Incumbents ==
=== Habsburg Netherlands ===
Monarch – Philip IV, King of Spain and Duke of Brabant, of Luxembourg, etc.

Governor General – John of Austria the Younger

=== Prince-Bishopric of Liège ===
Prince-Bishop – Maximilian Henry of Bavaria

== Events ==
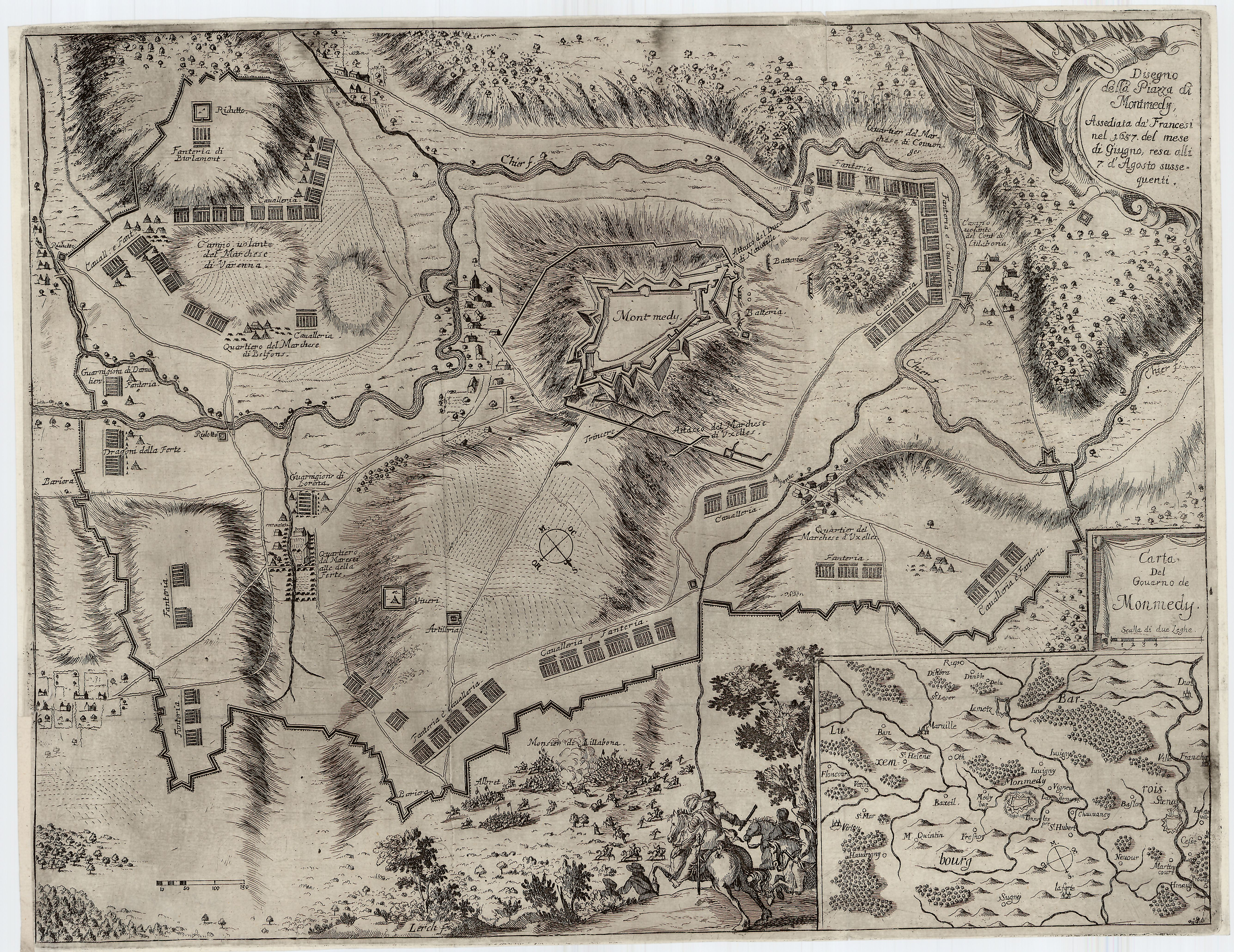
A map of the 1657 Siege of Montmédy

January

- 22-23 January — Brussels government issues clarifications on the decrees regarding the billeting of soldiers in winter quarters.

March

- Treaty of Paris: Anglo-French alliance targeting Dunkirk
- 21 March – Army of Flanders recovers Saint-Ghislain from the French.

May

- 28-30 May – Prince of Condé foils a French attempt on Cambrai.

June

- 26 June – Andreas Creusen installed as Archbishop of Mechelen
- June to August – French besiege and capture Montmédy in the Duchy of Luxembourg

September

- 21 September – Anglo-French forces take Fort-Mardyck
- 27 September – Brussels government institutes import restrictions on French wines.

November

- 29 November – Brussels government prohibits contribution payments to invading French forces.

== Foundations ==
- Trinity College, Leuven

== Art and architecture ==
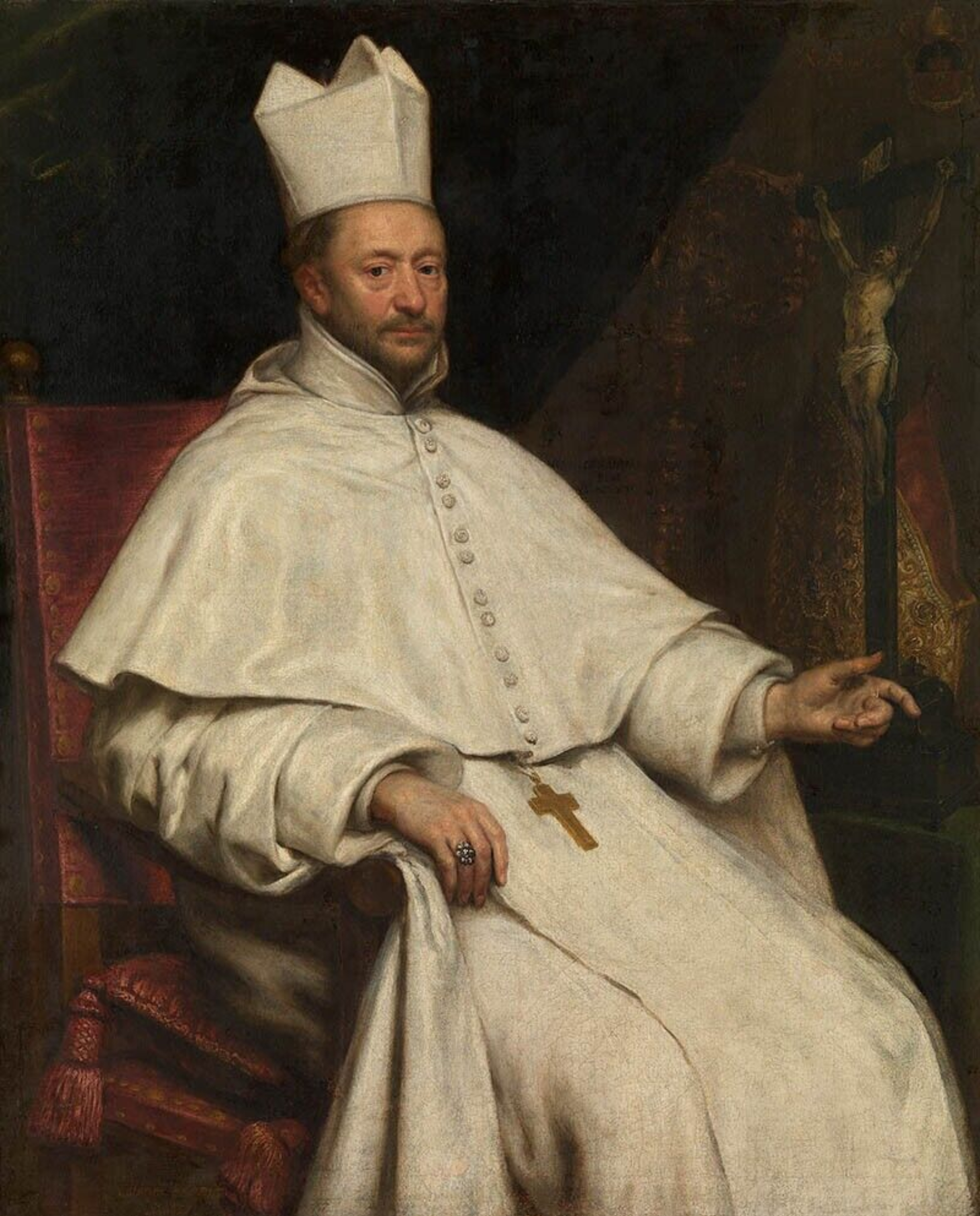
Katharina Pepijn, Portrait of Norbertus van Couwerven, Abbot of St Michael's

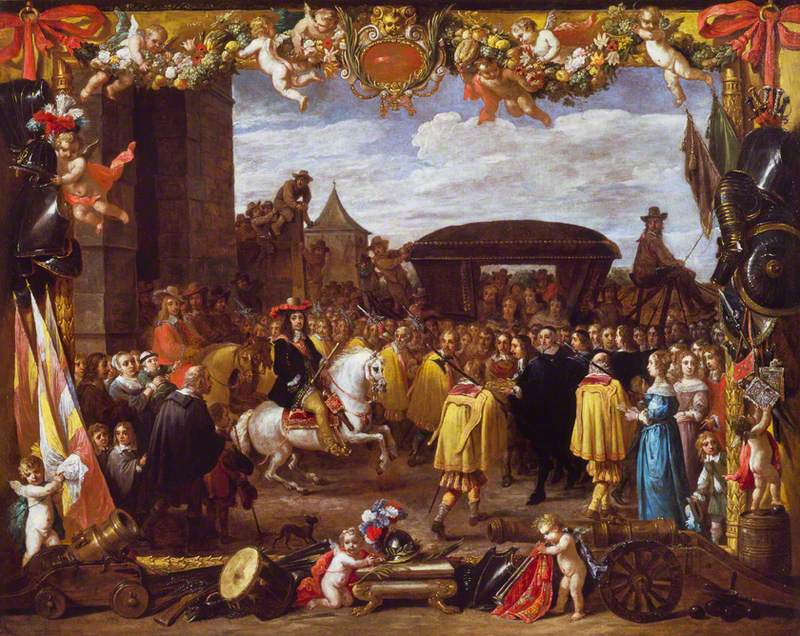
David Teniers the Younger, The Entry of Don Juan of Austria into Brussels (c.1657)

- Katharina Pepijn, Portrait of Norbertus van Couwerven, Abbot of St Michael's Abbey, Antwerp
- David Teniers the Younger, The Entry of Don Juan of Austria into Brussels

== Publications ==
- Guillaume Bolognino, Ni'uwe noodeliicke ortographie tot het schryven en 't drucken van onse Nederduytse tale (Antwerp, Jacob Mesens)
- Sébastien Bouvier, Miroire de saincteté en la vie, mort et miracles de S. Feuillien (Liège, H. Tournay)
- Guilielmus Hesius, Legatus fidelis ad oratores christianos (Antwerp, Cornelis Woons)
- Jean-Henri Manigart, Diva Leodiensis consolatrix afflictorum (Liège, B. Bronckart)
- Adriaan Poirters, Het duyfken in de steen-rotse (Antwerp, Cornelis Woons)
- Joannes van der Elst, Notae Augustinianae sive Musices Figurae seu Notae Novae Concinendis Modulis Faciliores (Ghent, Maximiliaan Graet)
- Arnout Van Geluwe, Corte Antwoorde, Op een onschriftmatige gereformeerde vraghe raeckende het H. Sacrament des Autaers (Ghent, Maximiliaan Graet)
- Charles de Visch, O.Cist., Het leven van den Eerw. Heere ende Vader in Christo, Heer Adrianus Cancellier in voorleden tijden den XXXIX. Abt van het Loffelyck Klooster ten Duynen, translated by Jan van Blitterswyck (Bruges, Lucas vanden Kerchove)

== Births ==
- 17 January (baptism) – Pieter van Bloemen, painter (died 1720)
- 1 April – Gratien Simon, potter (died 1692)

Date uncertain

- Charles FitzCharles, 1st Earl of Plymouth (died 1680)
- Guillaume Héris, Herman de Sainte-Barbe in religion, Carmelite (died 1724)
- Gérard Melyn, Augustinian hermit (died 1734)
- Jan Baptist Tijssens the Younger, painter (died after 1723)

== Deaths ==
- 9 February – Philippe Bouchy (born 1574), ascetic author
- 15 March – Pierre Fisch, abbot of Echternach
- 21 March – Georges Galopin (born c.1600), ecclesiastical author
- 2 April – Ferdinand III (born 1608), Holy Roman Emperor
- 28 May – Anthonius Triest (born 1576), bishop of Ghent
- 29 May – Antoine de Bourgogne (date of birth unknown), prelate
- 25 July – Willibrord Bosschaerts (born 1577), ecclesiastical author
- 4 August – Jean d'Allamont (born 1626), governor of Montmédy
- 27 August – Gottfried Huyn van Geleen (born c.1595), soldier
- 1 October – Albert Rubens (born 1614), scholar and administrator

Date uncertain

- Gilles De Haes (born 1597), military commander
