= 1655 in Belgium =

- Decades: 1630s; 1650s
- See also: Other events of 1655; List of years in Belgium

Events in the year 1655 in the Spanish Netherlands and Prince-bishopric of Liège (predecessor states of modern Belgium).

== Incumbents ==
=== Habsburg Netherlands ===
Monarch – Philip IV, King of Spain and Duke of Brabant, of Luxembourg, etc.

Governor General – Archduke Leopold Wilhelm of Austria

=== Prince-Bishopric of Liège ===
Prince-Bishop – Maximilian Henry of Bavaria

== Events ==
- 19 June to 13 July – Siege of Landrecies
- September – Diplomatic relations with the Commonwealth of England broken off
- 31 October – Jurisdiction over Herstal transferred from Philip IV to the Prince-Bishopric of Liège

== Art and architecture ==
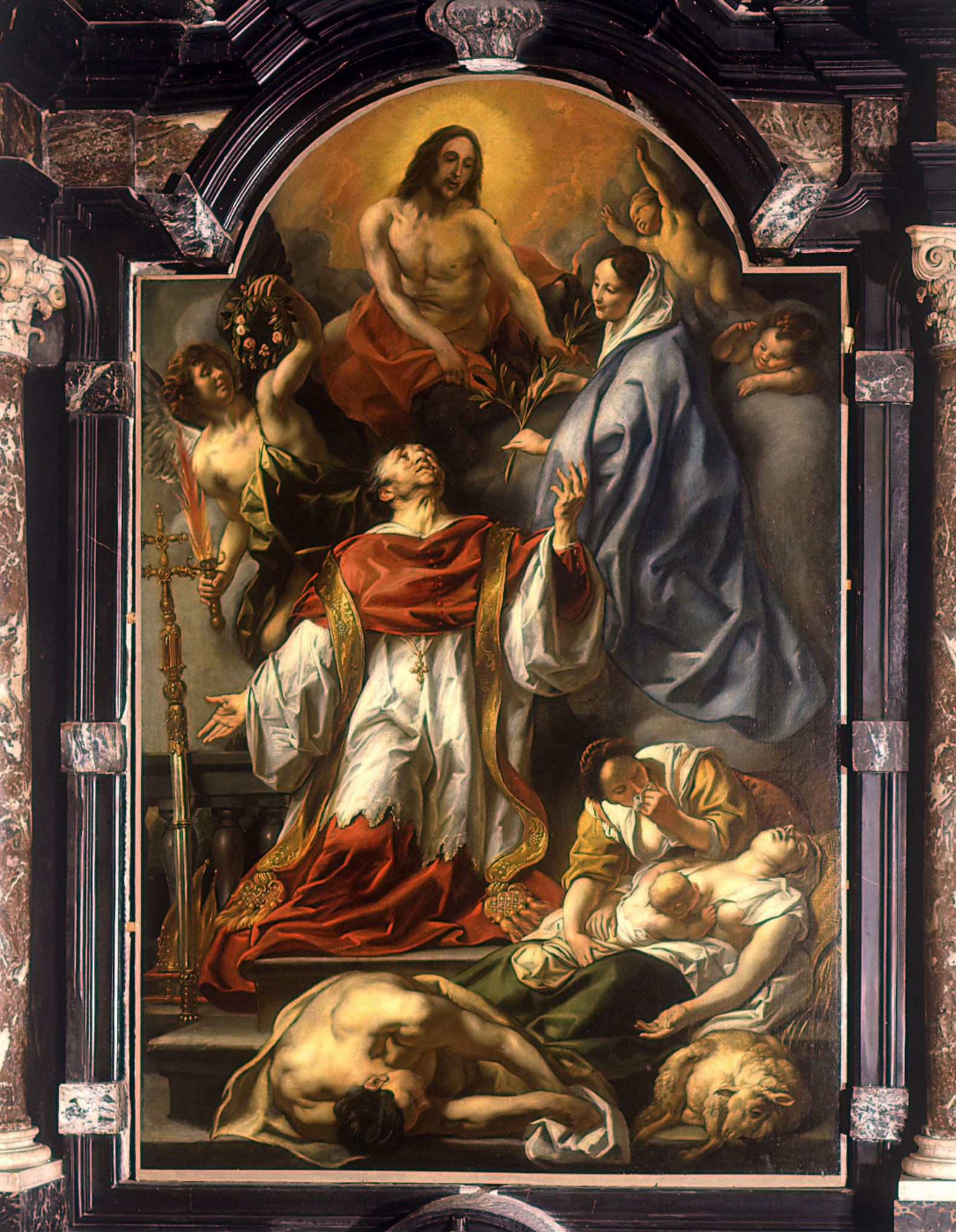
Jacob Jordaens, St Charles Borromeo interceding for victims of plague (1655)

- Jacob Jordaens, St Charles Borromeo interceding for victims of plague, in St. Charles Borromeo Church, Antwerp

== Publications ==
- (Augustinian College, Ghent), De heylighe vyf wonden ons saligh-makers Iesv Christi (Ghent, Maximiliaan Graet) — a school play performed in September 1655.
- Aegidius Bucherius, Belgium Romanum ecclesiasticum et civile (Liège, Henri and Jean-Matthieu Hoven)
- Jean-Jacques Chifflet, Anastasis Childerici I. Francorum Regis, Sive Thesaurus Sepulchralis Tornaci Nerviorum effossus, et Commentario illustratus (Antwerp, Plantin Press)
- Adriaan Poirters, Het pelgrimken van Kevelaer, Inhoudende de litanien, hymni, liedekens, herders-dichtjens, en reysgebeden voor de processie van Kevelaer (Roermond)
- Charles de Visch, Vita Reverendi in Christo Patris ac Domini, D. Adriani Cancellier, monasterii Dunensis, Ordinis Cisterciensis, quondam Abbatis (Bruges, Nicolaes Breyghel)

== Births ==
- 25 April (baptism) – Pieter Rijsbraeck, artist (died 1729)

Date uncertain

== Deaths ==
- 29 March – Valerius Andreas (born 1588), scholar
- 30 March – Joannes Couchet (born 1615), harpsichord maker
- 29 April – Cornelis Schut (born 1597), painter
- 30 June – Jacobus Boonen (born 1573), clergyman
- 10 August – Lodewijk de Vadder (born 1605), artist
- 27 September – Nicolaas Rubens, Lord of Rameyen (born 1618)

Date uncertain

- Hendrick Andriessen (born 1607), painter
- Jacques Fouquier (born c.1590/91), painter
