= 1656 in Belgium =

- Decades: 1630s; 1650s
- See also: Other events of 1656; List of years in Belgium

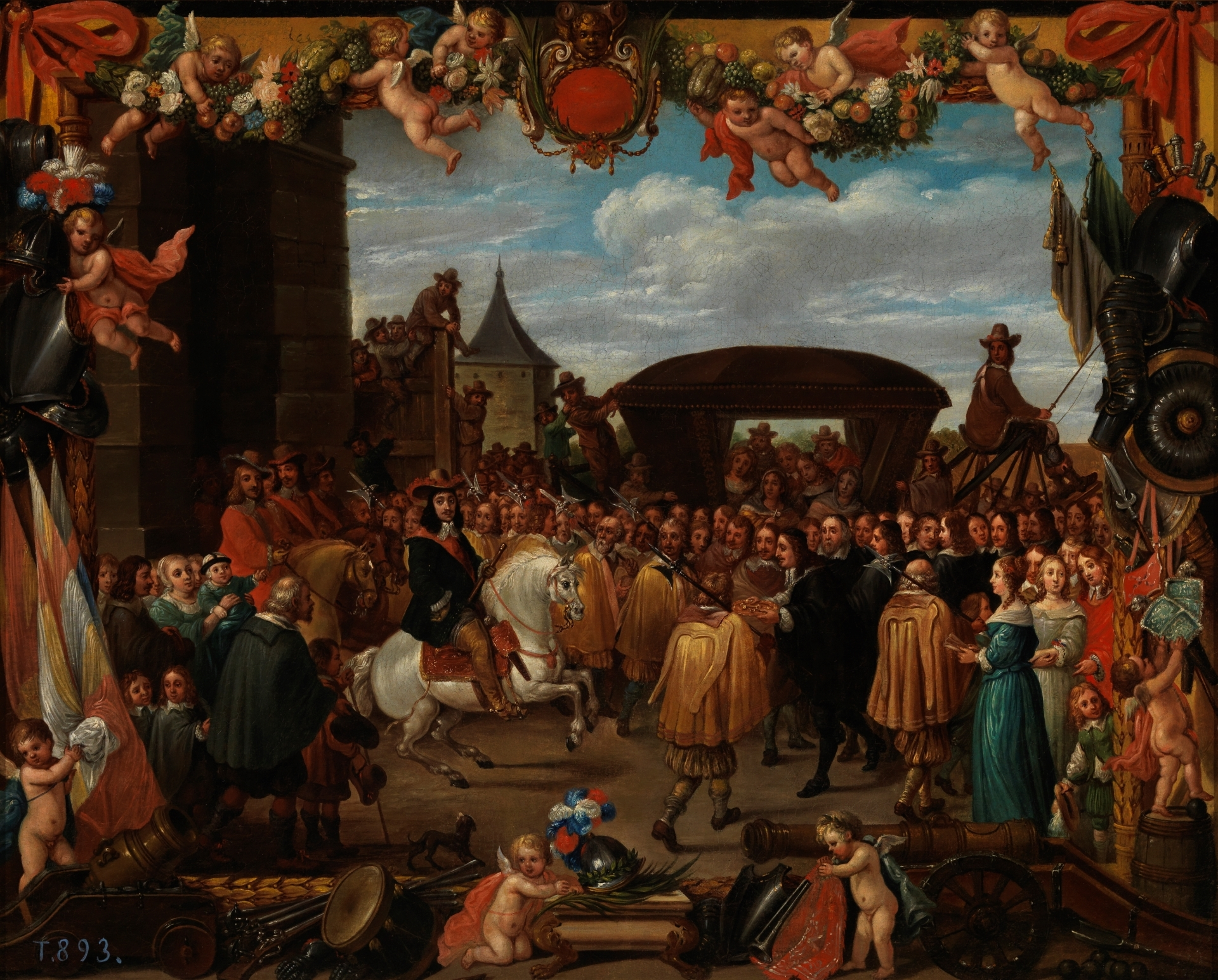
David Teniers the Younger, Triumphal entry of Don John of Austria (c.1657)

Events in the year 1656 in the Spanish Netherlands and Prince-bishopric of Liège (predecessor states of modern Belgium).

== Incumbents ==
=== Habsburg Netherlands ===
Monarch – Philip IV, King of Spain and Duke of Brabant, of Luxembourg, etc.

Governor General – Archduke Leopold Wilhelm of Austria (until May); John of Austria the Younger (from May)

=== Prince-Bishopric of Liège ===
Prince-Bishop – Maximilian Henry of Bavaria

== Events ==
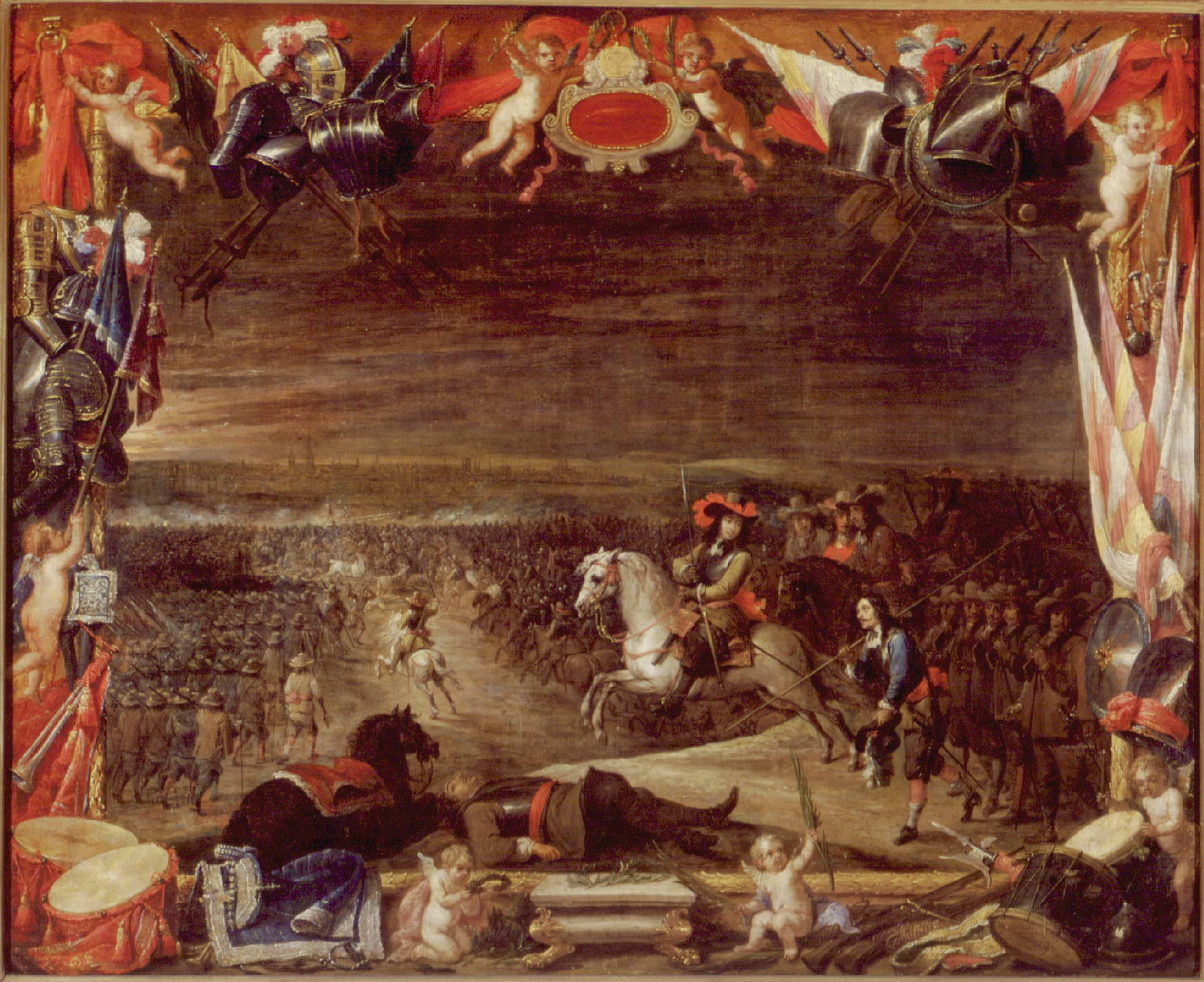
David Teniers the Younger, Battle of Valenciennes

- 13 March – Dunkirkers fight with English ships near Goodwin Sands.
- 2 April – Treaty of Brussels concluded between representatives of Philip IV of Spain and the exiled Charles II of Great Britain
- 11 May – John of Austria the Younger enters Brussels as Governor General.
- 12 July – Battle of Valenciennes

== Art and architecture ==
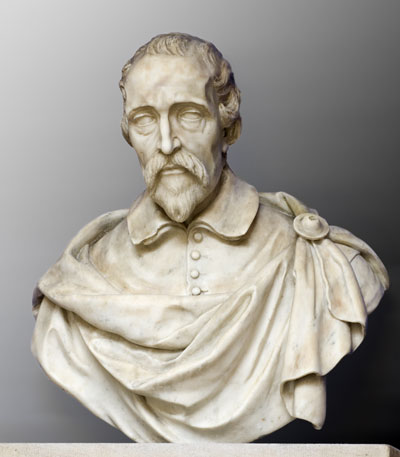
Bust of Cornelis II Landschot

- Sebastiaen van den Eynde, Bust of Cornelis II Landschot (c. 1656)
- St. James' Church, Antwerp completed

== Publications ==
- Emanuel d'Aranda, Relation de la captivité et liberté du sieur Emanuel de Aranda, mené esclave à Alger en l'an 1640, et mis en liberté l'an 1642 (Brussels, Jan Mommaert the Younger)
- André Tacquet, Arithmeticae theoria et praxis (Leuven)

Pamphlets

- Kort beworp vande dry teghenwoordighe aenmerckens-weerdighe wonderheden des wereldts, die wy in dese onsalighe ysere eeuwe beleven (printed anonymously)
- Valencenae obsidione liberatae a Ioanne principe Austriaco (Antwerp)

== Births ==
- 21 May – Bernard Bartholomeus Désirant, ecclesiastical writer (died 1725)

Date uncertain

- Lodewijk de Deyster, engraver and instrument maker (died 1711)

== Deaths ==
- 23 January – Jean Du Blocq (born 1583), Jesuit architect
- 22 March – Alexander I of Bournonville (born 1585), noble conspirator
