= 1654 in Belgium =

- Decades: 1630s; 1650s
- See also: Other events of 1654; List of years in Belgium

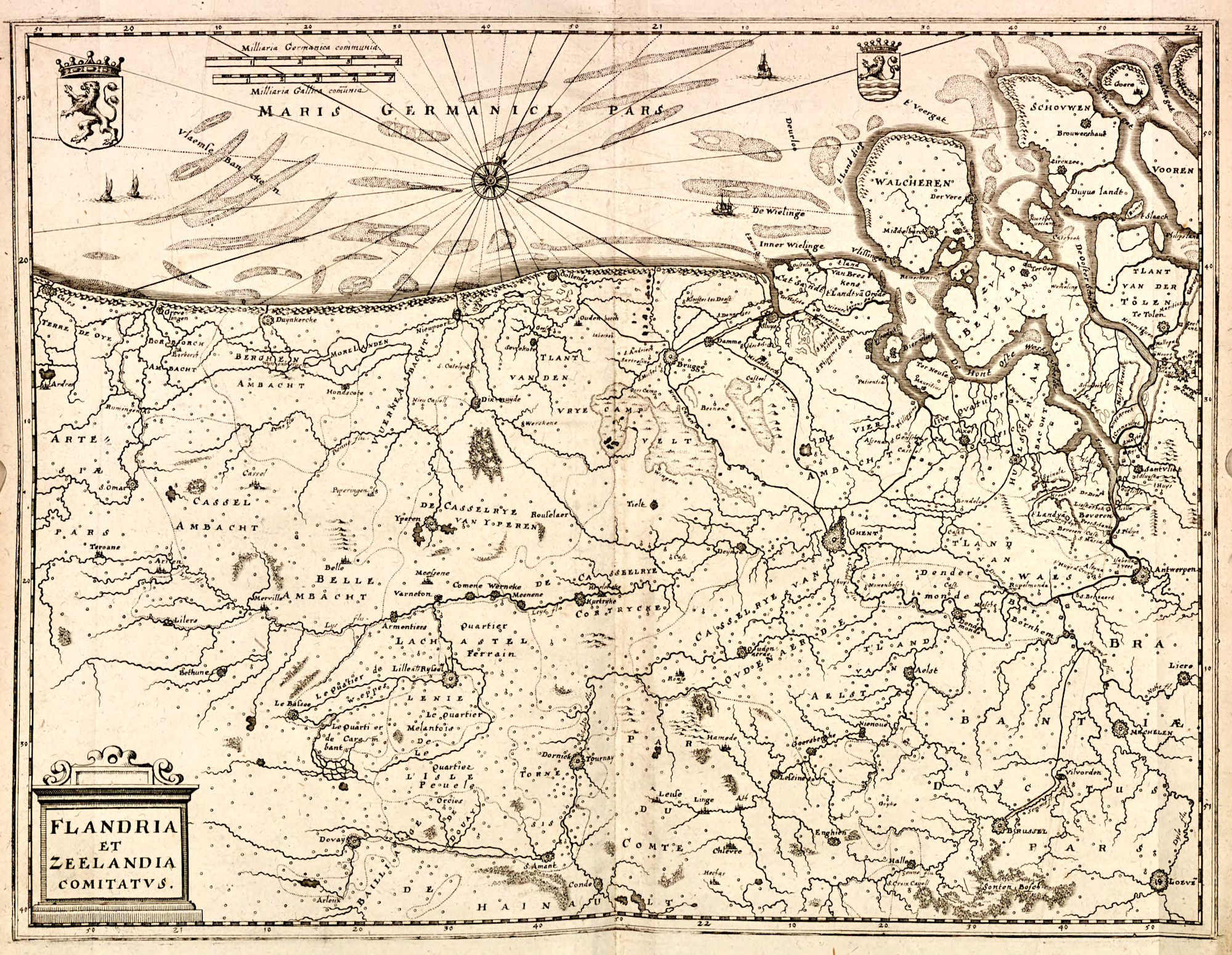
Matthäus Merian the Younger, Map of Flanders (1654)

Events in the year 1654 in the Spanish Netherlands and Prince-bishopric of Liège (predecessor states of modern Belgium).

== Incumbents ==
=== Habsburg Netherlands ===
Monarch – Philip IV, King of Spain and Duke of Brabant, of Luxembourg, etc.

Governor General – Archduke Leopold Wilhelm of Austria

=== Prince-Bishopric of Liège ===
Prince-Bishop – Maximilian Henry of Bavaria

== Events ==
- 26 February – Charles IV, Duke of Lorraine, placed under arrest in Brussels.
- 13 March – Magistrates of Antwerp issue regulations to limit the spread of plague
- 17 March – Treaty of Tienen agreed between representatives of Philip IV and Maximilian Henry of Bavaria, formally recognising the neutrality of the Prince-Bishopric of Liège
- 25 August – French forces defeat the Army of Flanders in the Battle of Arras
- 13 September – Ambrosius Capello consecrated as bishop of Antwerp
- 28 September – Artist Jérôme Duquesnoy the Younger executed in Ghent under the sodomy laws for having sexually abused two children
- 3 November – Prince-bishop of Liège posthumously rehabilitates Pierre de Bex, executed in 1651
- 13 December – Jean de Wachtendonck consecrated as bishop of Namur

Date uncertain

- Martino Martini demonstrates a magic lantern in Leuven

== Art and architecture ==
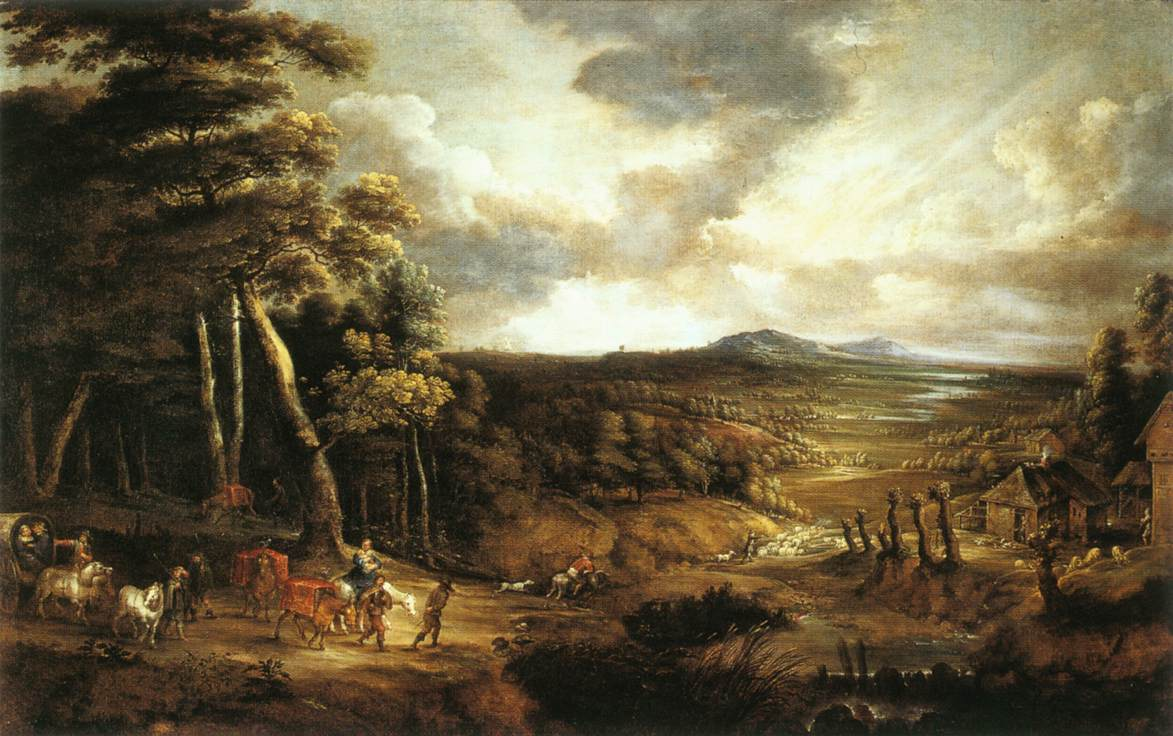
Lucas van Uden, Landscape with the Flight into Egypt (1654)

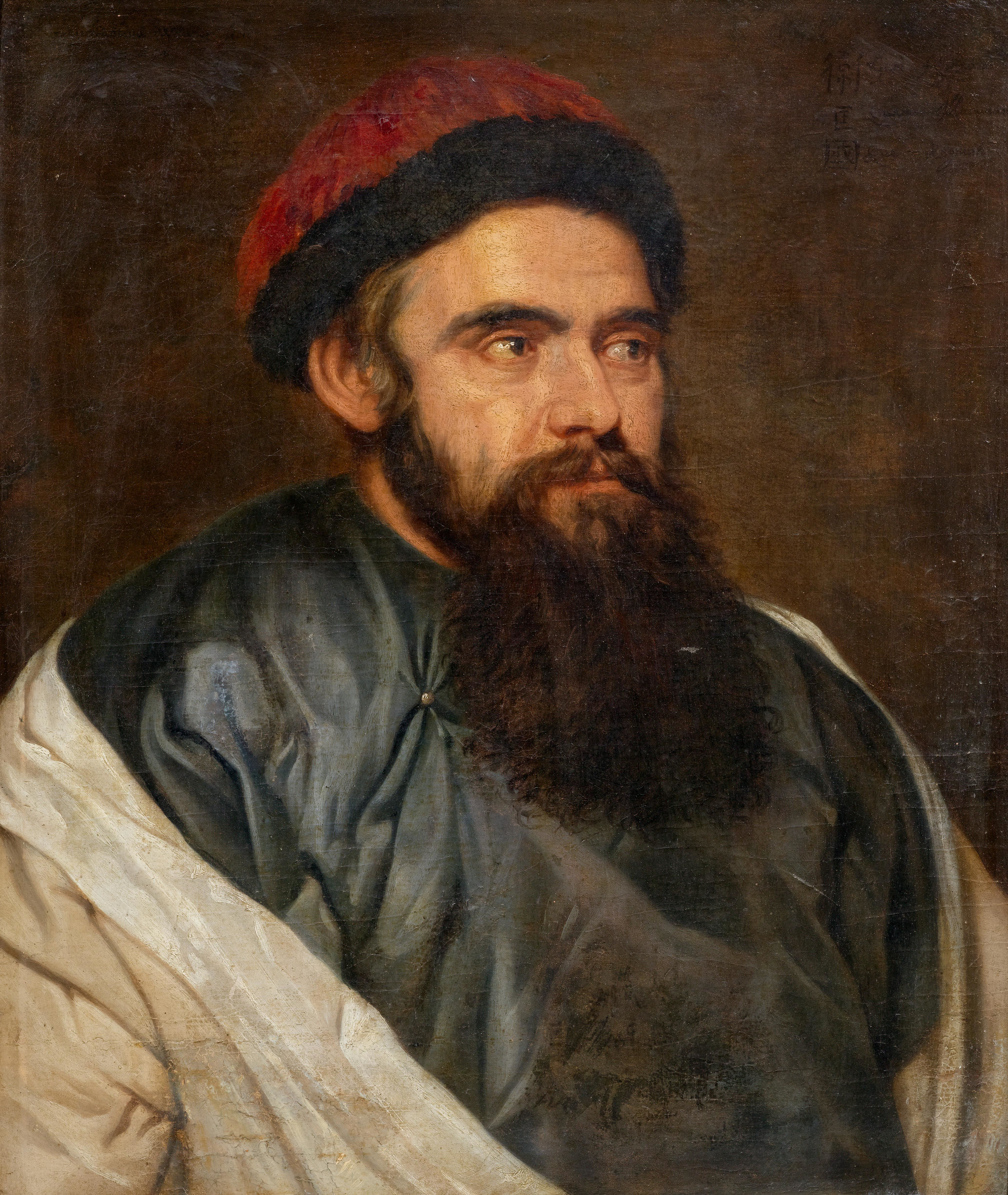
Michaelina Wautier, Portrait of Martino Martini (1654)

- Lucas van Uden, Landscape with the Flight into Egypt
- Michaelina Wautier, Portrait of Martino Martini

== Publications ==
- Martino Martini, De Bello Tartarico (Antwerp, Plantin Press).

Newspapers

- Nieuwe Tydinghen uyt verscheyde ghewesten (Bruges, Nicolaes Breyghel)

== Births ==
- 23 November – Jan van Kessel the Younger, painter (died 1708)
- Date uncertain – Ferdinand de Berlo de Brus, clergyman (died 1725)

== Deaths ==
- 2 January – Anthoine Brun (born 1599), diplomat
- 23 January – Thomas Willeboirts Bosschaert (born 1613), painter
- 6 May – Louis-François Verreycken (born 1588), public official
- 28 September – Jérôme Duquesnoy the Younger (born 1602), sculptor
