= 1652 in Belgium =

- Decades: 1630s; 1650s
- See also: Other events of 1652; List of years in Belgium

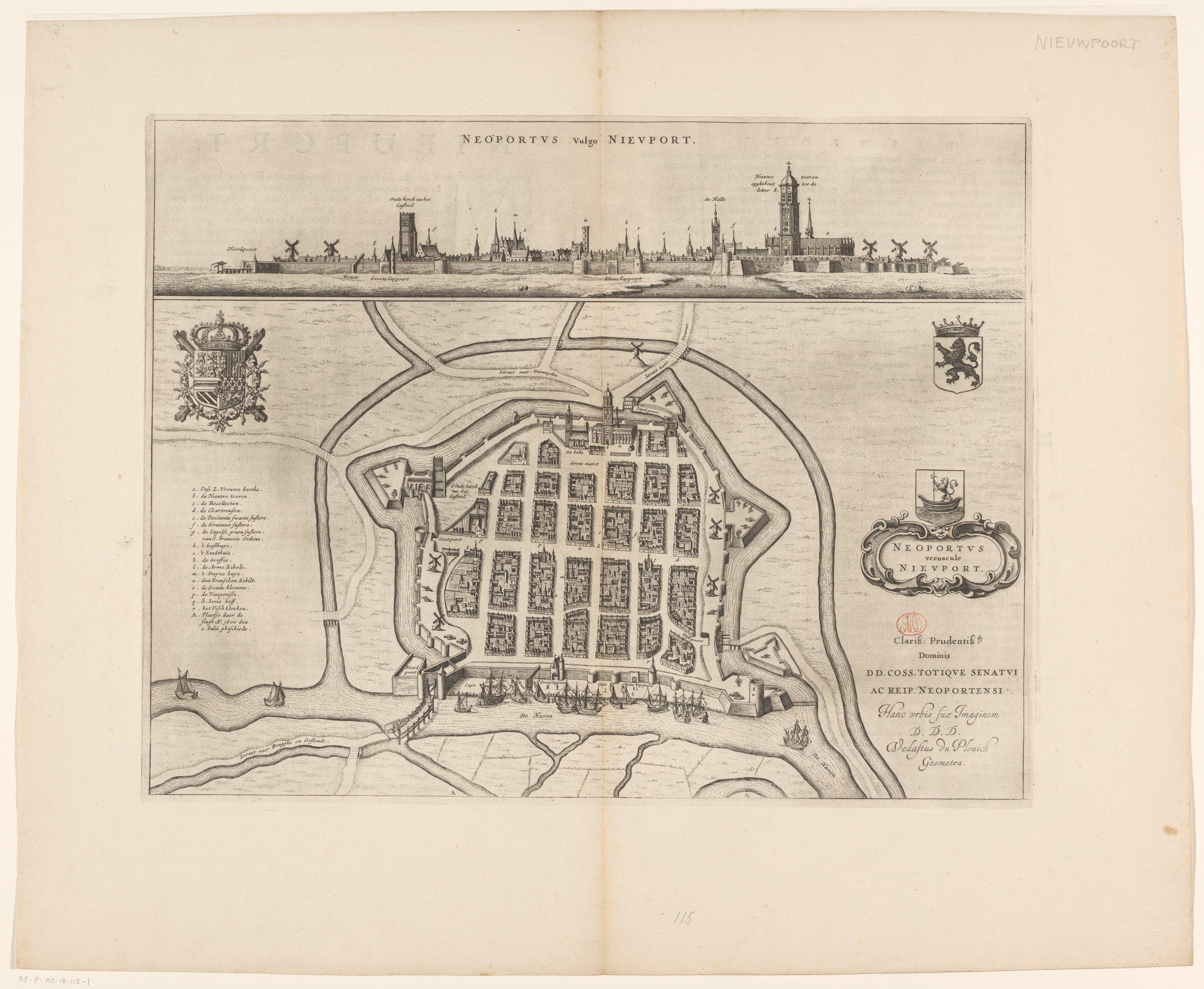
View and map of Nieuwpoort (1652)

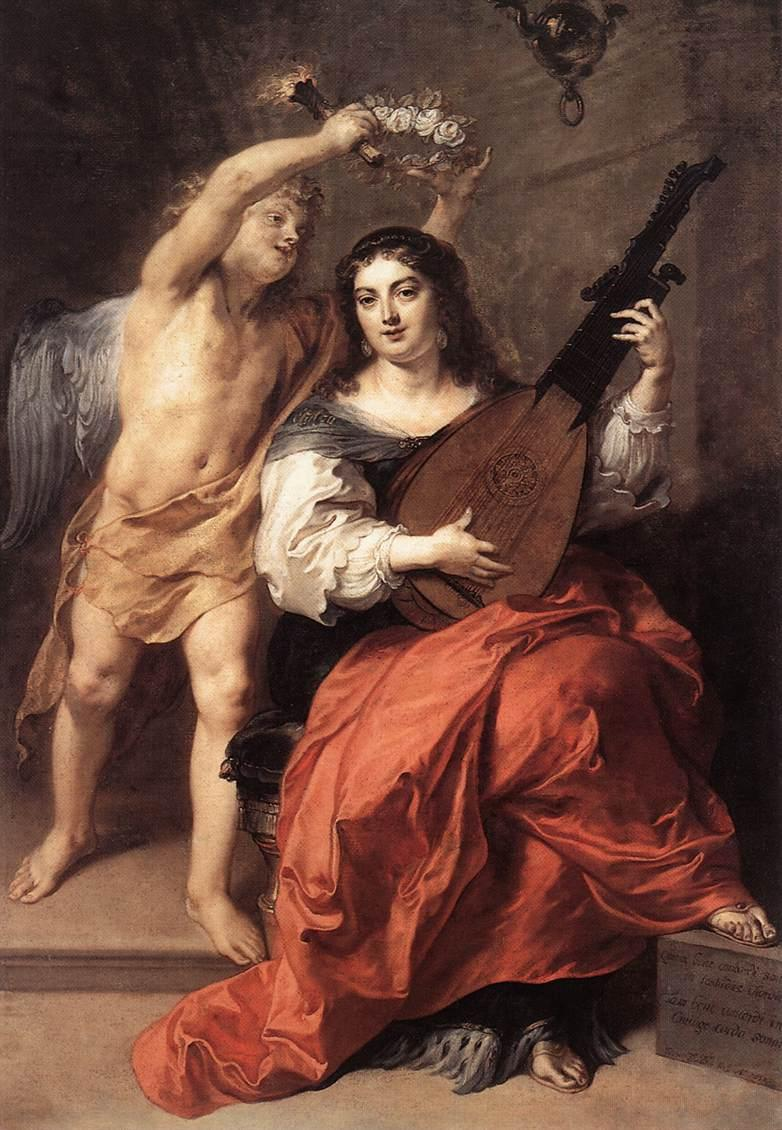
Theodoor van Thulden, Harmony and Marriage (1652)

Events in the year 1652 in the Spanish Netherlands and Prince-bishopric of Liège (predecessor states of modern Belgium).

== Incumbents ==
=== Habsburg Netherlands ===
Monarch – Philip IV, King of Spain and Duke of Brabant, of Luxembourg, etc.

Governor General – Archduke Leopold Wilhelm of Austria

=== Prince-Bishopric of Liège ===
Prince-Bishop – Maximilian Henry of Bavaria

== Events ==
- 10 January – Proclamation in Liège banishing brigands, vagabonds and beggars from the territory
- 20 February – Brussels Privy Council issues a general regulation on coinage, listing the coins to be accepted as legal tender.
- 17 April – Brussels Council of Finances relaxes restrictions on the importation of English cloth, but limiting imports to Ostend.
- 14 July – Jacobus de la Torre consecrates the new Capuchin church in Brussels, designed by Fr Charles of Brussels.
- 16 September – Army of Flanders recaptures Dunkirk, occupied by the French in 1646
- 10 December – Decree in Liège ordering owners of mills, forges and furnaces along the river Ourthe to remove all obstacles to navigation on the river.

== Art and architecture ==
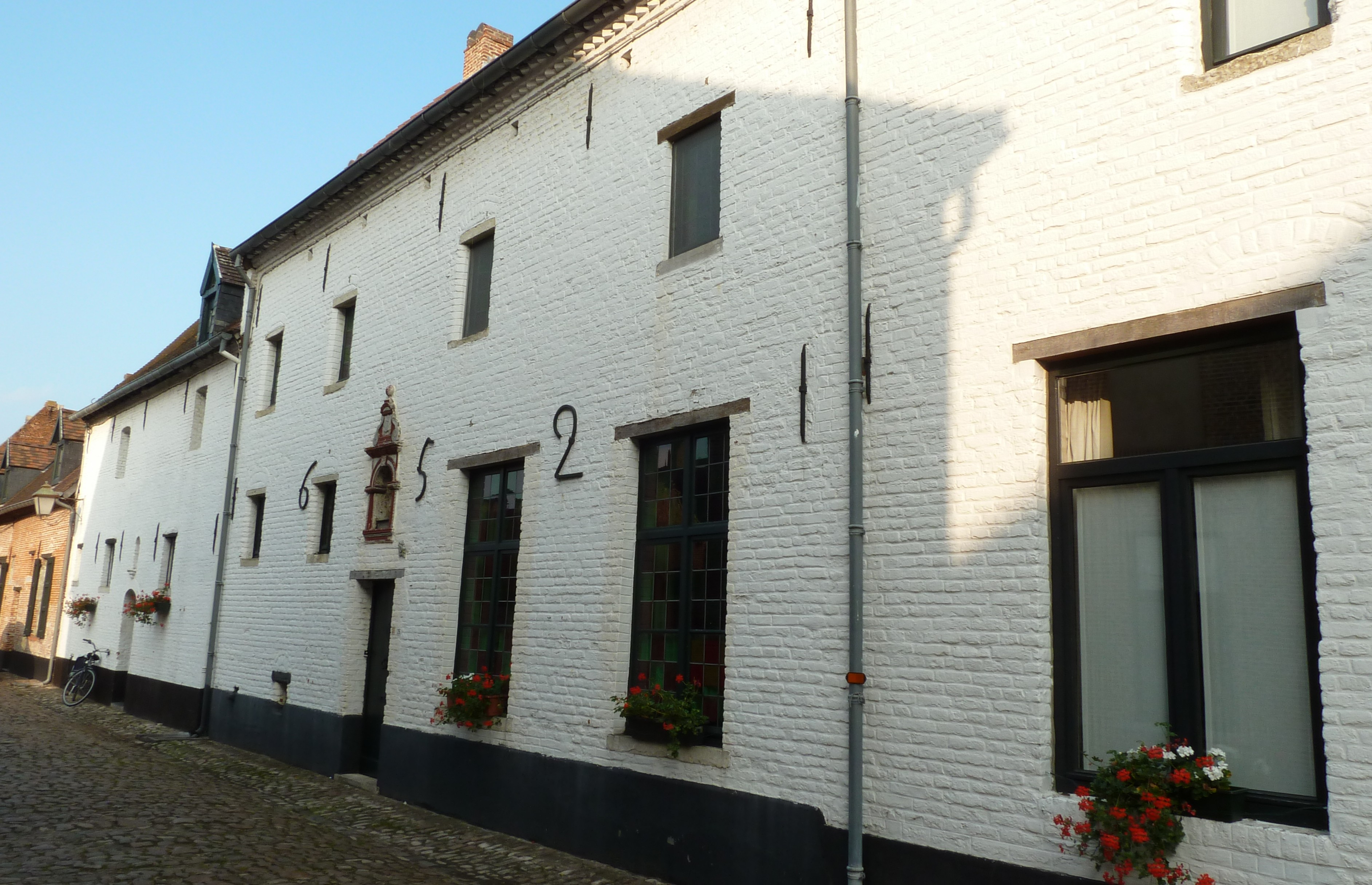
A house in Diest beguinage dated 1652

Buildings

- House in Diest beguinage dated 1652

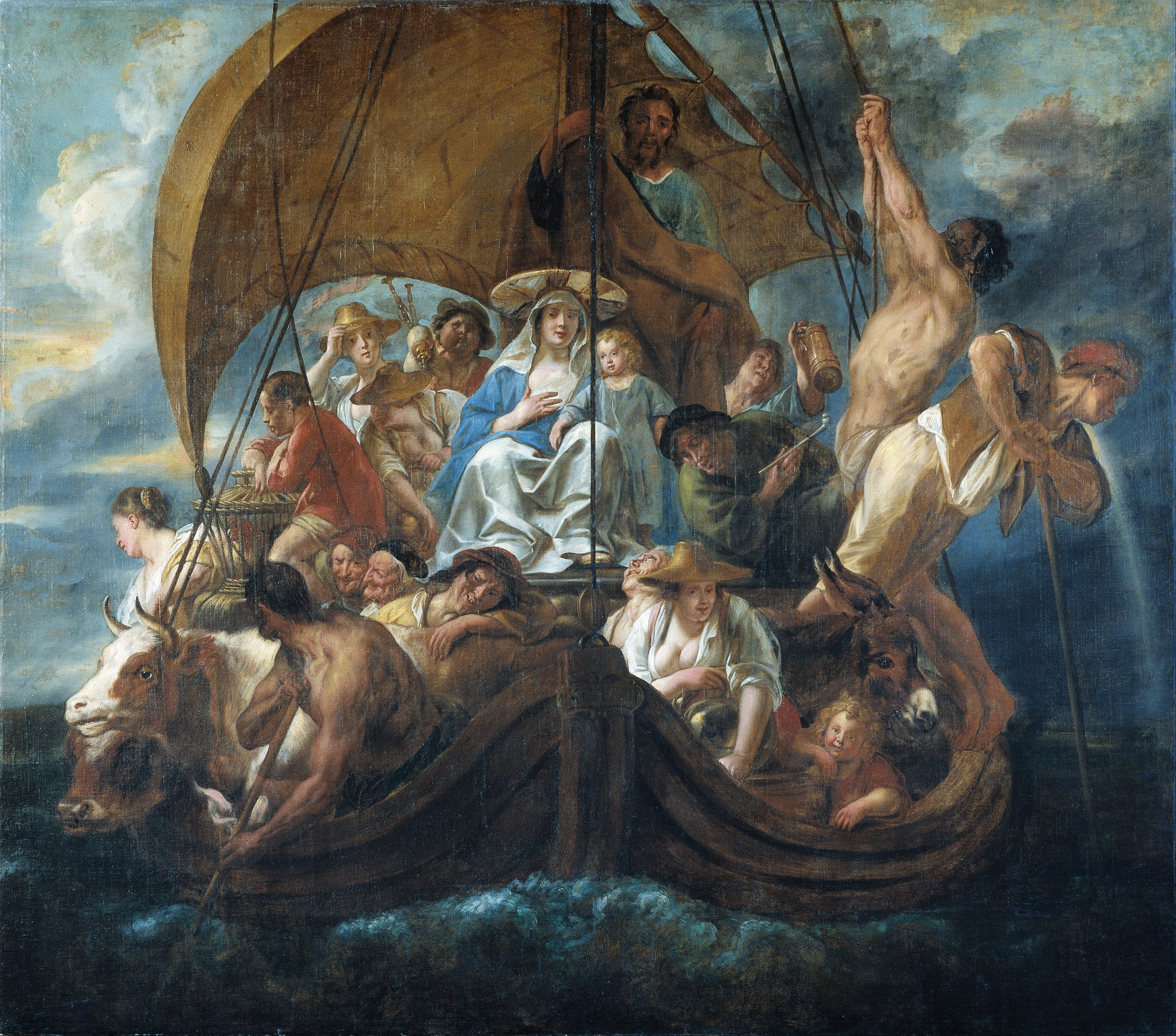
Jacob Jordaens, The Holy Family in a Boat (1652)

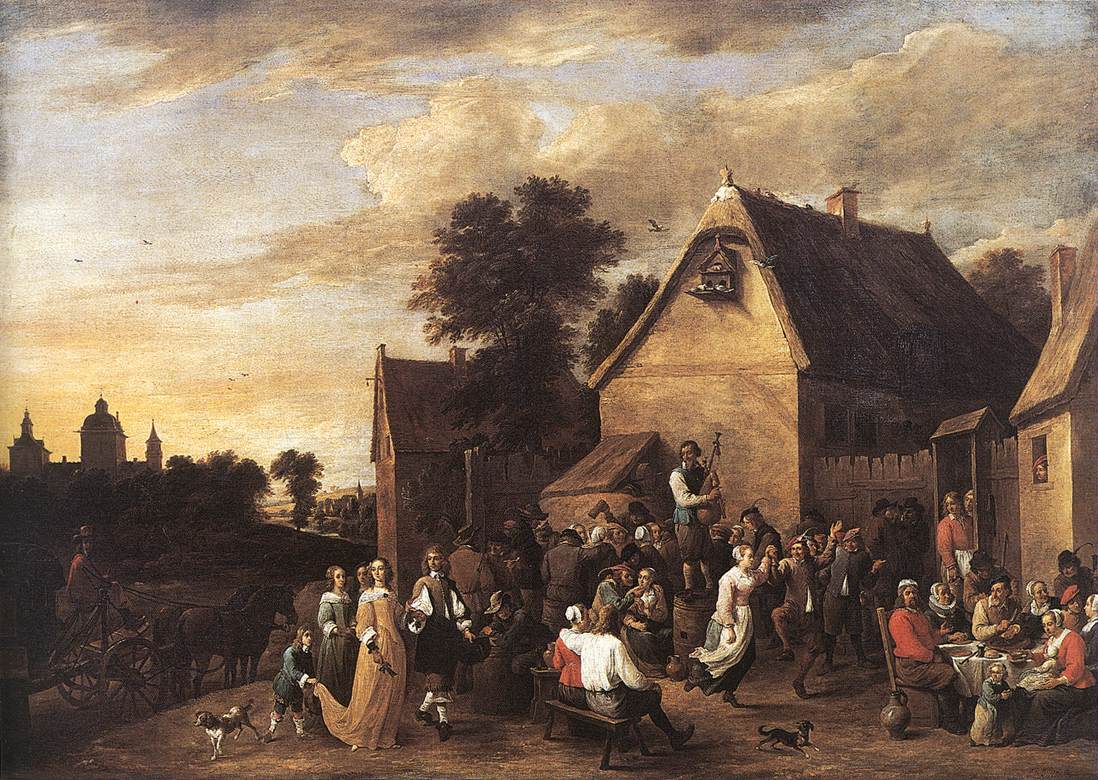
David Teniers the Younger, Flemish Kermess (1652)

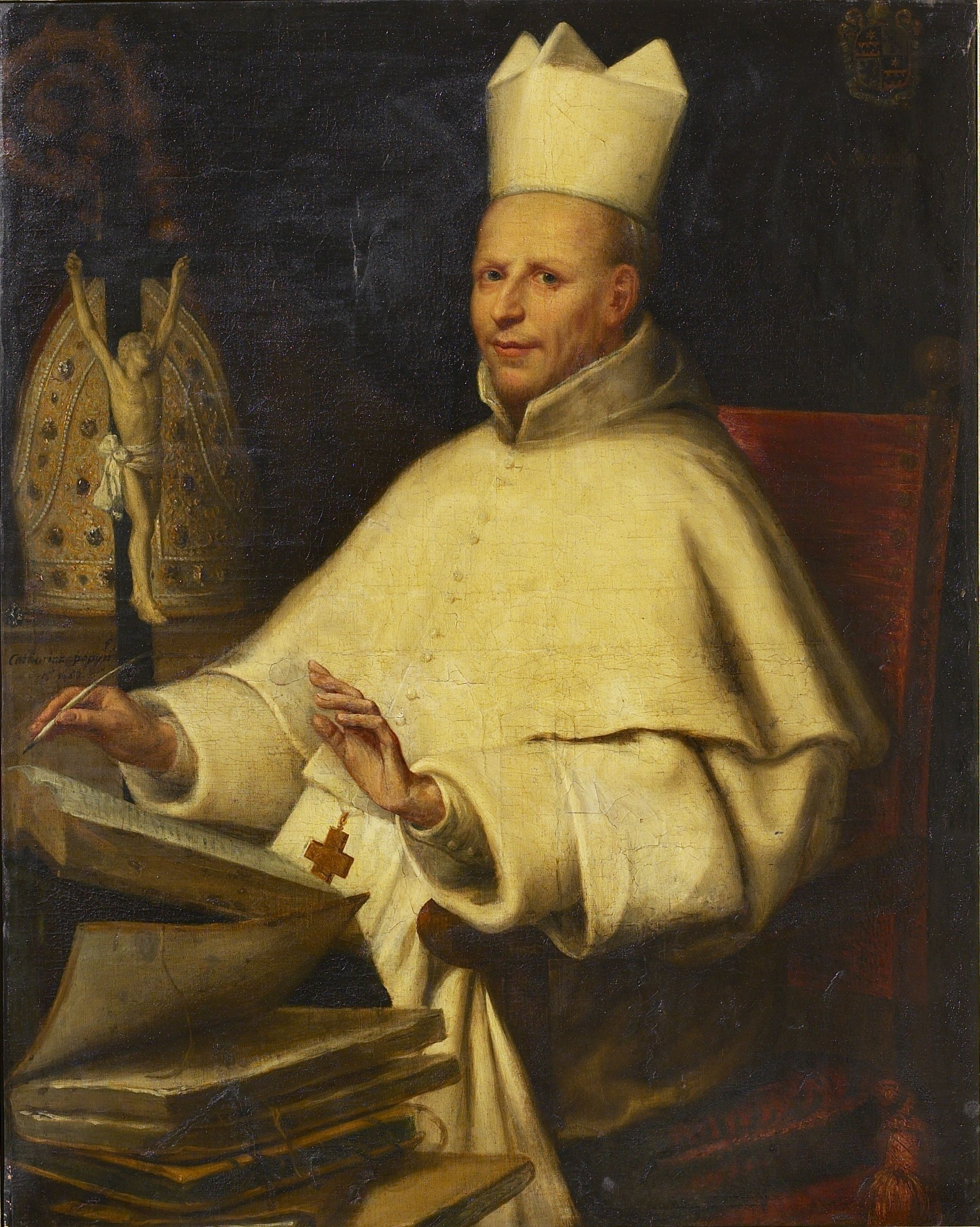
Katharina Pepijn, Portrait of Johannes Chrysostomus vander Sterre, Abbot of St. Michael's Abbey, Antwerp

Paintings

- Jacob Jordaens, The Holy Family in a Boat
- Katharina Pepijn, Portrait of Johannes Chrysostomus vander Sterre, Abbot of St. Michael's Abbey, Antwerp
- David Teniers the Younger, Flemish Kermess
- Jan van den Hecke, Still Life of Parrot Tulips, Roses, Carnations, Morning Glory and Other Flowers in a Silver Dish on a Stone Pedestal
- Theodoor van Thulden, Harmony and Marriage

== Publications ==
- Edward Knott, Infidelity Unmasked, or The Confutation of a Booke, Published by M. William Chillingworth, under this Title: The Religion of Protestants a Safe Way to Salvation' (Ghent, Maximiliaan Graet)
- Petrus Stockmans, Jus Belgarum circa bullarum pontificarum receptionem (published anonymously)

Periodicals

- Relations veritables, edited by Pierre Hugonet (Brussels, printed by Guillaume Scheybels to be sold by Guillaume Hacquebaud)

== Births ==
- 20 November (bapt.) – Marie Duchatel, painter (died 1692)

== Deaths ==
- 25 July – Bonaventura Peeters the Elder (born 1614), painter
- 13 October – Abraham Verhoeven (born 1575), publisher of the Nieuwe Tijdinghen
- 1 November (bur.) – Pieter van Avont (born 1600), painter

Date uncertain

- Andries van Eertvelt (born 1590), painter
