= Nieuwpoort =

Nieuwpoort is the name of:

- Nieuwpoort, Belgium, a town in Belgium
  - Battle of Nieuwpoort (1600)
- Nieuwpoort, Curaçao, a village and tourist resort in Curaçao
- Nieuwpoort, South Holland, a town in South Holland

== People with the surname ==
- Lars Nieuwpoort (born 1994), Dutch footballer
- Sven Nieuwpoort (born 1993), Dutch footballer

== See also ==
- Nieuwspoort
