= Siege of Bergues =

1658 siege during the Franco-Spanish War

- Part of the Franco-Spanish War (1635–1659)
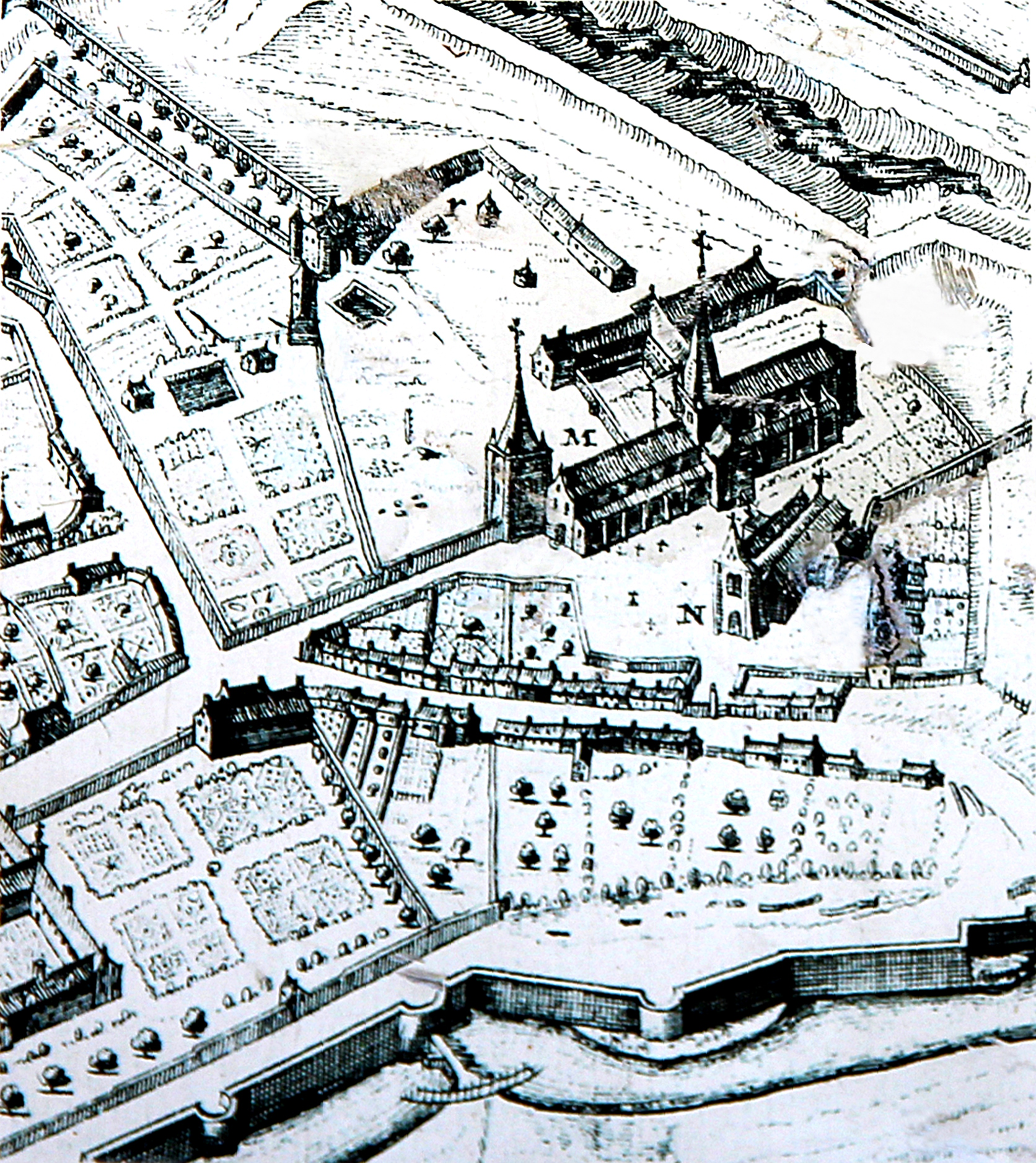
- 1635 engraving of Bergues
Date	c. 28 June – 1 July 1658
Location	Bergues-Saint-Vinox, France 50.966667°N 2.433333°E
Result	French victory

Belligerents
Kingdom of France	(Spain) Spanish Empire

Commanders and leaders
(Kingdom of France) Victomte de Turenne	Unknown

Strength
Unknown	Unknown

Casualties and losses
Unknown	Unknown

The Siege of Bergues-Saint-Vinox, more simply called the Siege of Bergues, took place from 28 June to 1 July 1658 and ended with the capture of the town by the French armies commanded by Henri de La Tour d'Auvergne, Viscount of Turenne, from the Spanish Army of Flanders during the Franco-Spanish War (1635–1659).

== Background ==
After the Battle of the Dunes (1658), the Spanish troops of Louis II de Bourbon, Prince de Condé and John Joseph of Austria were decimated. Lacking troops capable of holding the field, nothing resisted the troops of the King of France, Louis XIV, commanded by Henri de La Tour d'Auvergne, Viscount of Turenne, who arrived before Bergues-Saint-Vinox.

== Siege ==
On 28 June 1658, French troops arrived before the town and immediately invested it.

After resisting for three days, during which the mestre de camp of the Picardy Regiment, Claude de Brichanteau, Marquis of Nangis, was mortally wounded by a musket shot, the town surrendered to the Viscount of Turenne on 1 July 1658.

== Aftermath ==
After this capture, French troops laid siege to Furnes on 4 July, Dixmude on 5 July, and Gravelines, which was defended by 3,000 men and captured on 30 August.

== See also ==
- Franco-Spanish War (1635–1659)
- Battle of the Dunes (1658)
- Henri de La Tour d'Auvergne, Viscount of Turenne
- Bergues
