= Jan Vaerman =

Flemish mathematician

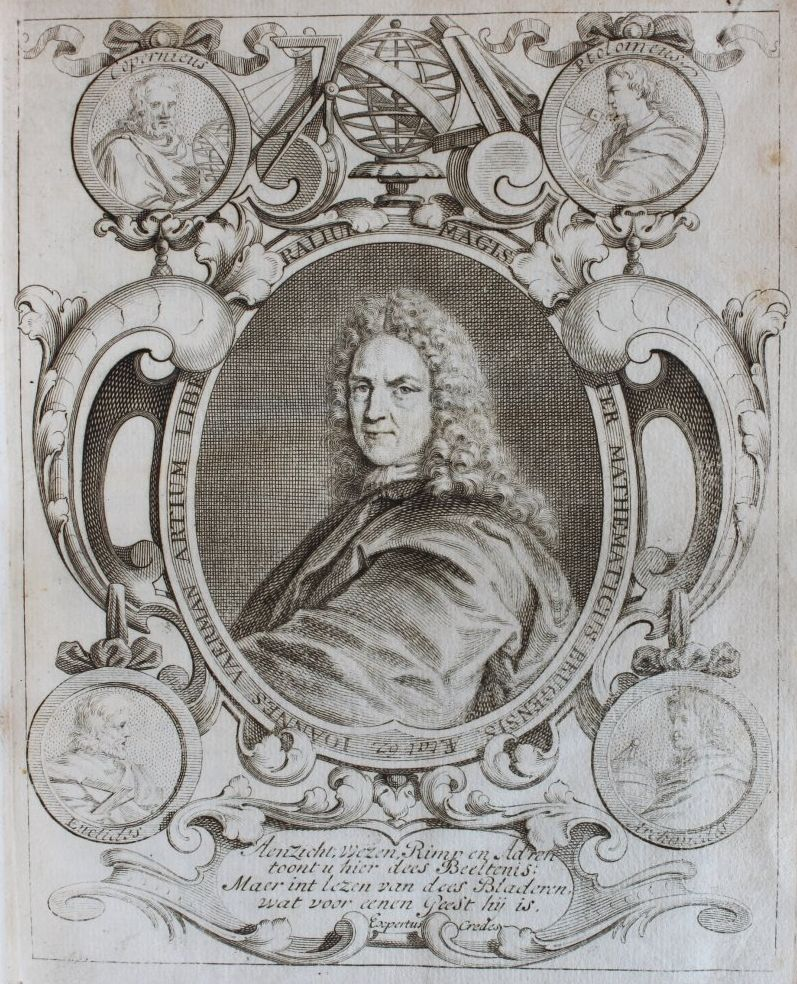
Frontispiece from Vaerman's Academia Mathematica of Oeffen-school van de Wis-konst

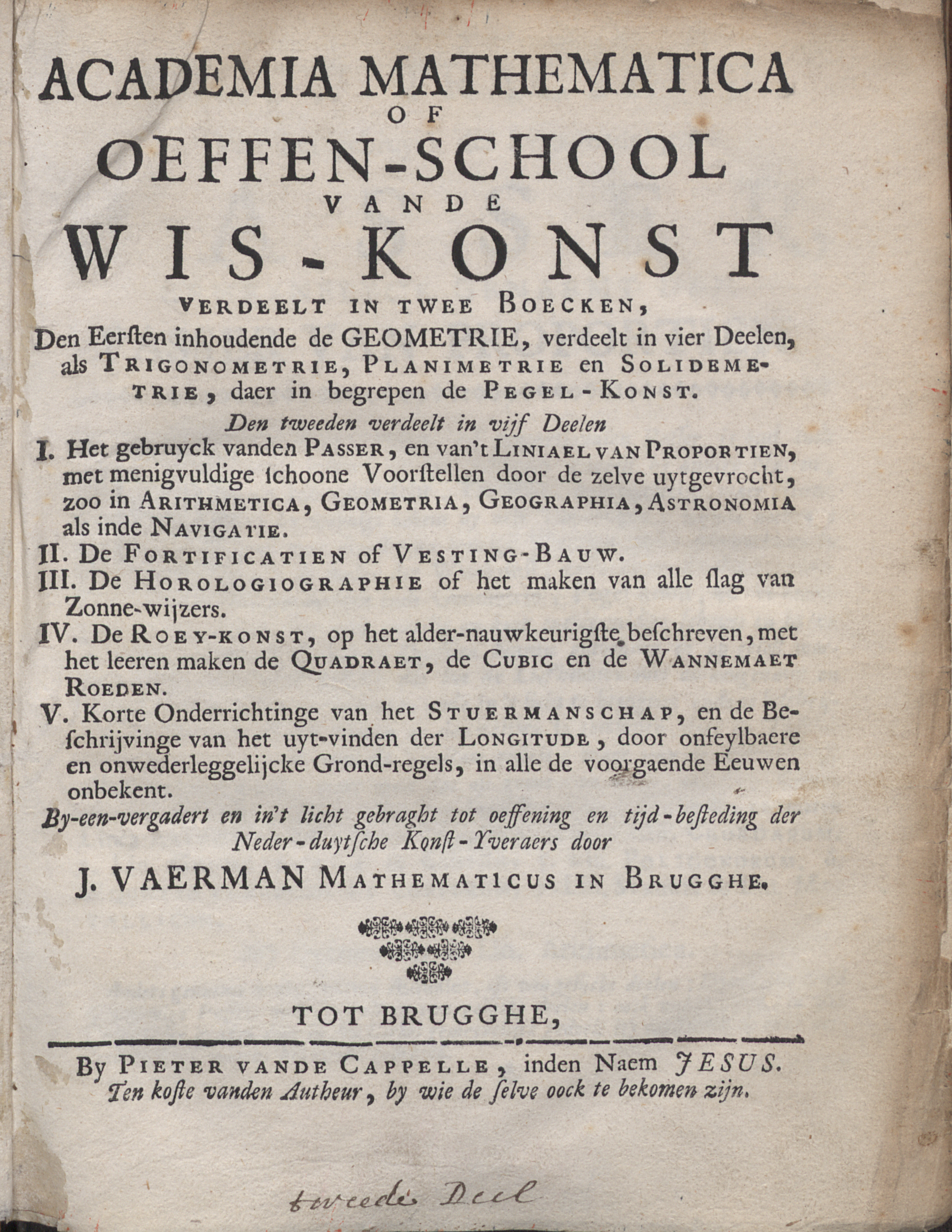
Academia Mathematica of Oeffen-school vande Wis-konst (1719)

Jan Vaerman (1653–1731) was a Flemish mathematician.

He worked as a school teacher first in Bruges and then, from 1693 to 1717, in Tielt. He wrote about French grammar, arithmetic, geometry, trigonometry and planimetrics.

== Works ==
- Ontledingh der Fransche spraeck-konst. L'anatomie de la grammaire françoise. Bruges: Franciscus Van Heurce. 1699.
- Academia Mathematica of Oeffen-school van de Wis-konst. Bruges: Pieter vande Cappelle. 1719.
