= Henry Taylor (diplomat) =

Henry Taylor or Henri Teller (1598–1662) was a Catholic priest from the Spanish Netherlands, of English descent, who was employed in Habsburg diplomatic service in England, France, and Poland.

== Life ==
Taylor was born in the Low Countries in 1598, the son of the English Catholic exiles Robert Taylor and Mary Fowler, and grandson of John Taylor, of Bickerton in Yorkshire, who had been steward to the Earl of Cumberland. He studied at the English College at St-Omer and the University of Douai, where he graduated licentiate of laws.

In the summer of 1621, Taylor entered the household of the Count of Gondomar, Spanish ambassador in London, becoming his secretary and accompanying him back to Spain in 1622. He organised the Count's library and personal archive in Valladolid. Early in 1625, Gondomar twice sent him to London as a diplomatic courier, first to James I and then to Charles I, in last-ditch attempts to prevent an Anglo-Spanish War. From 1627 to 1628 he served as language secretary and interpreter to the Spanish ambassador to France, the Marquis of Mirabel, but in 1628 and 1629 undertook secret missions to London, in concert with Peter Paul Rubens, for preliminary talks that would eventually lead to the Treaty of Madrid (1630). In 1630 he served as secretary to Carlos Coloma during his brief embassy to London.

In 1631, the Infanta Isabella, Governess General of the Spanish Netherlands, appointed Taylor, whom Coloma had left in London as chargé d'affaires, as her accredited agent to the court of Charles I, with orders to promote free trade between England and the Spanish Netherlands while discouraging English support for the Dutch Republic. His mission lasted until 1638, when the Spanish Crown decided that relations should be managed solely through the Spanish ambassador, without a separate agent representing the interests of the Spanish Netherlands.

Governor General Don Ferdinand appointed Taylor a canon in the chapter of St Pharaildis in Ghent. In 1639, he was appointed an assistant to the Marquis of Velada, Spanish ambassador extraordinary to Charles I, due to his fluent English and his thorough familiarity with British affairs. He arrived in Dover on 6 April 1640, and was present when Velada presented his accreditation at court. He left England in February 1641, and was appointed to a canonry of Brussels Minster.

In 1646–1647, Taylor travelled to Poland to lodge a diplomatic protest against French military recruitment there for the Franco-Spanish War. On his return, the Marquis of Castel-Rodrigo praised him to the king of Spain as a man of great virtue who had served with zeal for many years and was able to provide valuable services. He was appointed Master of Ceremonies of the Court Chapel in Brussels, and served as chief chaplain to the Governor General, Archduke Leopold Wilhelm, for the next seven years. In 1655, he again went on a diplomatic mission to England, as secretary and interpreter to the Marquis of Lede, sent as ambassador extraordinary in an attempt to stave off another Anglo-Spanish War.

When Richard Smith, titular bishop of Chalcedon, died in 1655, some English Catholic clergy petitioned the papal nuncio in Brussels to have Taylor appointed as his successor, but nothing came of this. On 7 November 1658 Taylor became Dean of Antwerp Cathedral. In 1660, when Carolus van den Bosch was transferred from the diocese of Bruges to Ghent, Taylor was the Brussels government's favoured candidate to replace him in Bruges, but was never appointed. He died on 1 November 1662.
