= Altar of Our Lady =

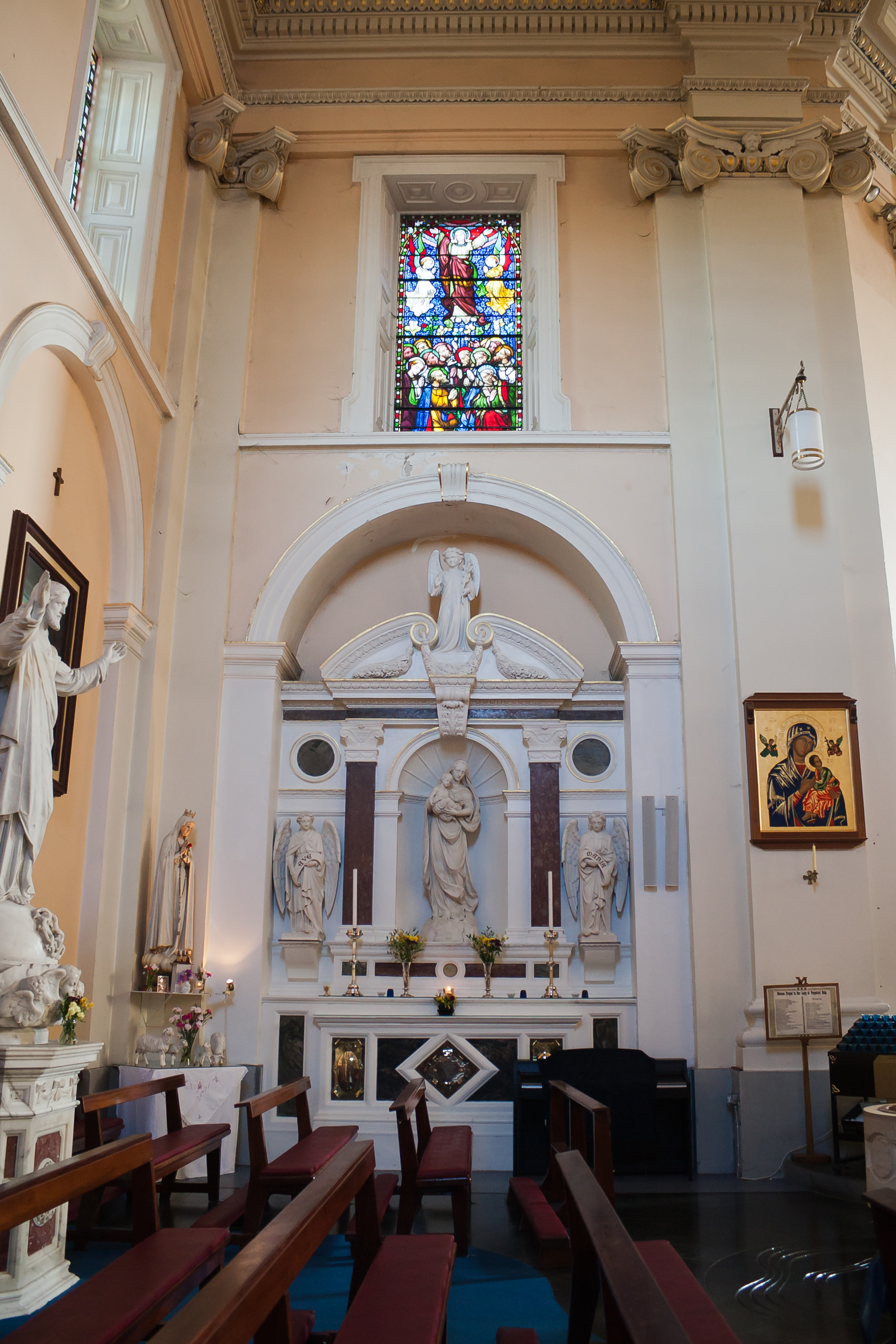
An altar of Our Lady on the left side of a church. The pews face towards the main altar.

An altar of Our Lady is a side altar in a Catholic church, usually the most prominent altar after the main or principal altar.

It is dedicated in a special manner to the Blessed Virgin Mary, Mother of God. To indicate this specific preference, this altar is usually placed in a prominent position in the church, to the right of the main altar (the gospel side), or as the focal point of a distinct Lady chapel.

In general it signifies any altar of which the Blessed Virgin is the titular.
