= Libert Froidmont =

Belgian theologian

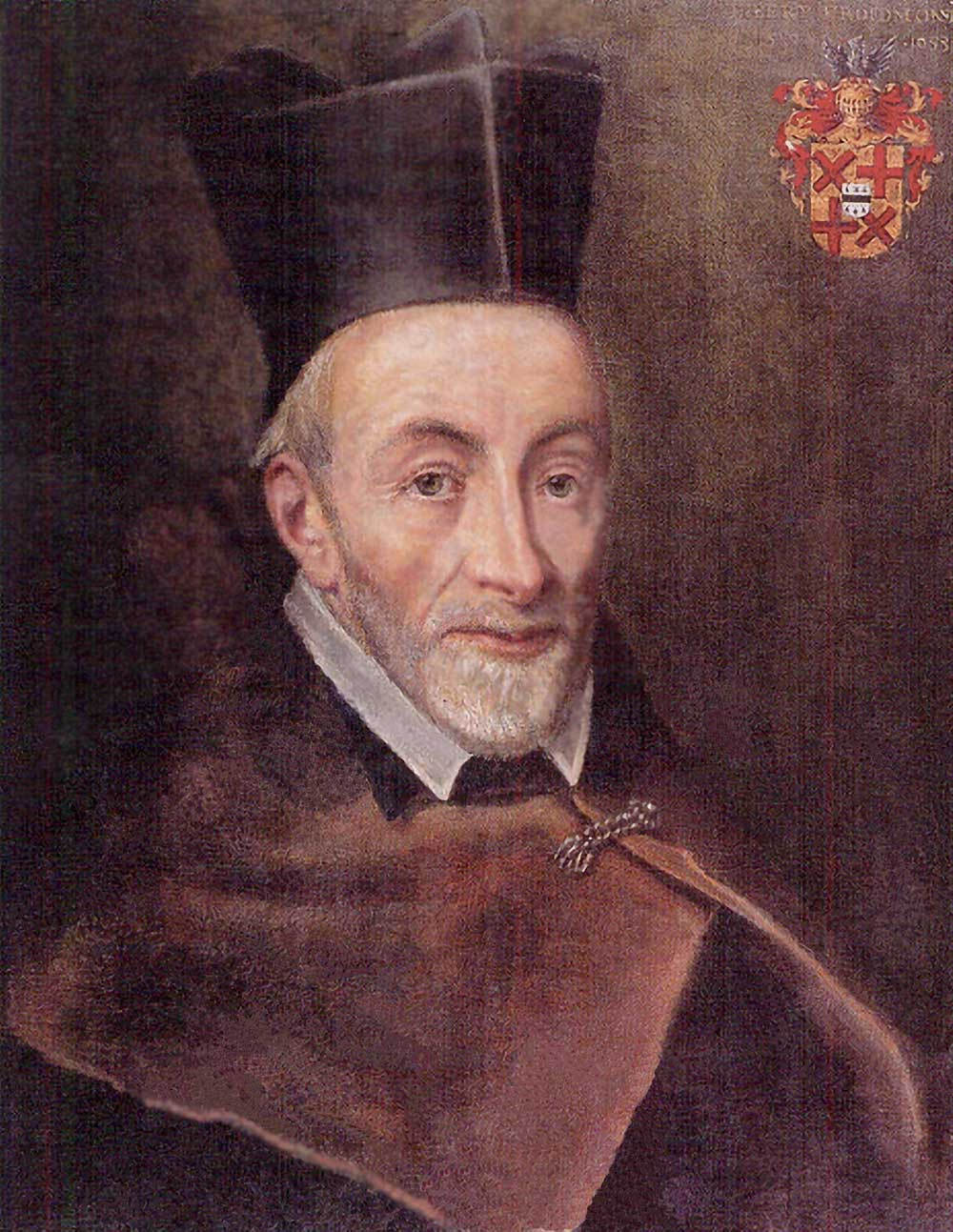
- Born: 3 September 1587; Haccourt, Prince-bishopric of Liège, Holy Roman Empire
- Died: 28 October 1653 (aged 66); Leuven, Duchy of Brabant, Spanish Netherlands
- Other name: Libertus Fromondus

Academic background
- Education: Louvain University

Academic work
- Discipline: Natural philosophy
- Institutions: Louvain University
- Notable works: Meteorologicorum libri sex (Antwerp, Plantin Press, 1627)

Libert Froidmont (Latin: Libertus Fromondus; 3 September 1587, in Haccourt-Liège – 28 October 1653, in Louvain) a son of Gerard Libert de Froidmont and Marguerite Radoux, was a Liégeois theologian and scientist. He was a close companion to Cornelius Jansen and corresponded with René Descartes.

== Life ==
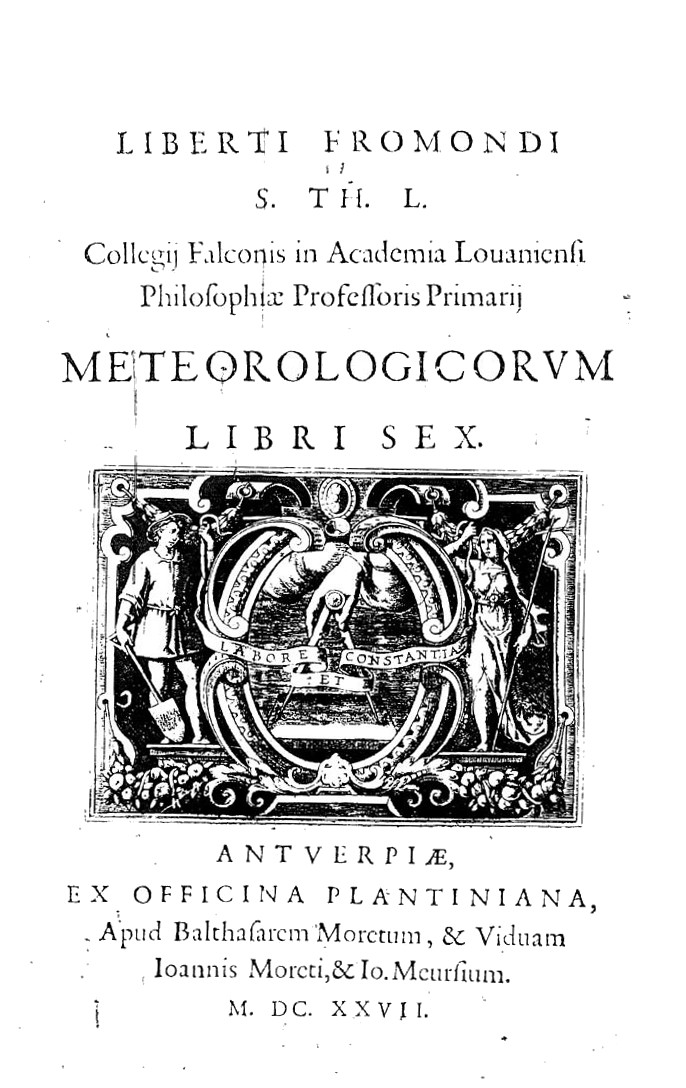
Meteorologicorum libri sex, 1627

Froidmont was educated by the Jesuits in his native Haccourt, near Liège, and studied philosophy in Leuven at the Falcon college. He became friends with Jansenius but did not pursue his studies and instead went to teach first at Antwerp and later back at Louvain. As a young professor there he was excited about Galileo's discoveries and introduced them to his students.

His scientific interests led him to publish on physics and mathematics.

Acknowledging him as an authority on meteors, Descartes sent him his Discourse on the Method, which Froidmont received rather critically. The scientific revolution may have been underway but Froidmont, who was well informed on many scientific matters, kept a traditionalist Aristotelian view. Nevertheless, he sought to co-opt rather than reject new approaches.

While teaching philosophy he also started studying theology and obtained a doctorate in 1628. Meanwhile, he had become close to Jansenius who entrusted him with the posthumous publication of the Augustinus. Froidmont succeeded him in the chair of Scripture at Louvain.

== Works ==
- Coenae saturnalitiae, variatiae Somnio sive Peregrinatione coelesti (Louvain, 1616)
- Dissertatio de cometa anni 1618 (Antwerp, 1619)
- Meteorologicorum libri sex (in Latin). Antwerpen: Iohannes Moretus (2.). 1627.
- Labyrinthus sive de compositione continui (Antwerp, 1631)
- Commentarii in libros Quaestionum naturalium Senecae (Antwerp, 1632)
- Anti-Aristarchus sive orbis terrae immobilis adversus Philippum Lansbergium (Antwerp, 1634)
- Philosophia Christiana de Anima (1649), where he talks about "novacula occami".

== Bibliography ==
- Bernès, A.-C. (éd.), Libert Froidmont et les résistances aux révolutions scientifiques. Actes du Colloque Château d'Oupeye, 26-7 septembre 1987, Haccourt, 1988.
- Cellamare, Davide; Bakker, Paul J.J.M. (2015). "Libertus Fromondus' Christian Psychology. Medicine and Natural Philosophy in the Philosophia christiana de anima (1649)" (PDF). Lias: Journal of Early Modern Intellectual Culture and Its Sources. 42 (1): 37–66.
- Demaret, H., Notice Historique sur Libert Froidmont de Haccourt, Liège,1925.
