= Michel Routart =

Spanish government official

Michel Routart (c.1580–1653) was a government official in the Spanish Monarchy of the 17th century, active in the Low Countries, Germany and Italy.

== Life ==
Born around 1580 at Arras, then part of the Spanish Netherlands, Routart studied at Leuven University, graduating Licentiate of Law. He entered the service of the Archdukes Albert and Isabella as a clerk in the secretariat of state. In 1623 he was sent on a mission to the royal court in Spain, where Philip IV of Spain awarded him the title of royal secretary in Castile, apparently as a purely honorary function. Routart soon left Spain and worked as secretary to Ambrogio Spinola, commander of the royal armies in the Low Countries and the Lower Palatinate. In that capacity he was involved in the negotiations for the capitulation of Breda in 1625. In June 1625, Archduchess Isabella appointed him ordinary secretary to the Privy Council, but he accompanied Spinola on his journeys to Spain and Italy. In January 1630 he was briefly appointed secretary for Italian letters in the government of the Duchy of Milan, and on 22 May 1630 Isabella appointed him governor of Oppenheim in the Palatinate.

After Spinola's death on 25 September 1630, Routart returned to the Low Countries. In 1633 he was appointed treasurer and warden of the charters of the County of Artois. By 1646, he was actively intervening with Philip IV with regard to the shortcomings of Pieter Roose as president of the Privy Council. He died in Brussels on 19 October 1653.

== Writings ==
Routart was the author of a short work on historiography, Oculus historiae ("The eye of history"), first printed in Leuven in 1628 and several times reprinted.

His manuscript "Relation de la famille du surnom de Routart" was the basis for his son's La maison et famille de Routart (Brussels, Jan Mommaert, 1668)
