= Adriaan Poirters =

Dutch poet and writer

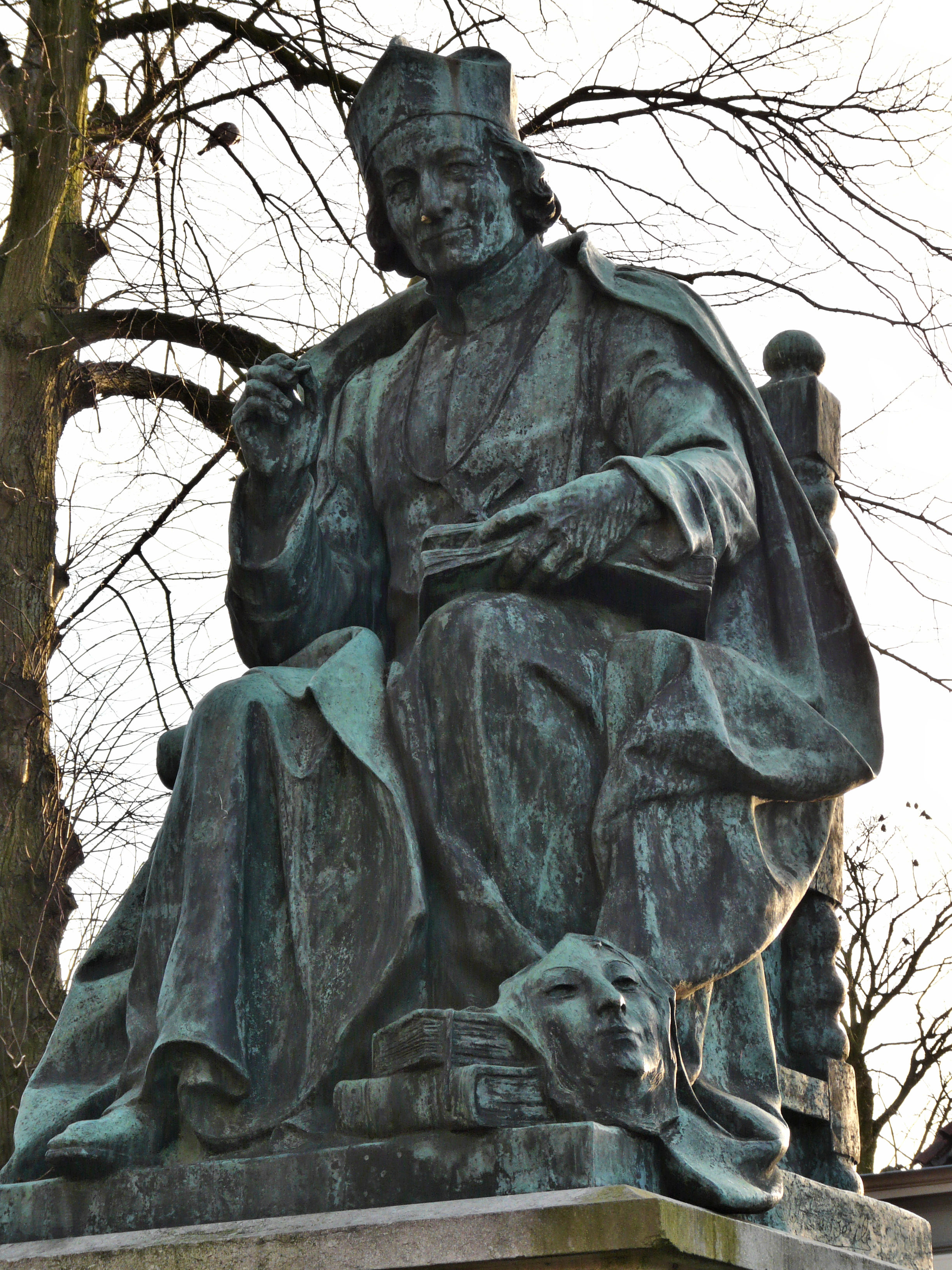
Statue of Adriaan Poirters in Oisterwijk.

Adriaan Poirters (baptised 2 November 1605, in the Sint-Petrus'-Bandenkerk in Oisterwijk – died 4 July 1674, Mechelen) was a Brabantian Jesuit poet and prose writer who was active in the Counter Reformation.
