= 1650 in Belgium =

- Decades: 1630s; 1650s
- See also: Other events of 1650; List of years in Belgium

Jacob Jordaens, Allegorical Portrait of a Family (c. 1650), now in the Hermitage Museum

Events in the year 1650 in the Spanish Netherlands and Prince-bishopric of Liège (predecessor states of modern Belgium).

== Incumbents ==
=== Habsburg Netherlands ===
Monarch – Philip IV, King of Spain and Duke of Brabant, of Luxembourg, etc.

Governor General – Archduke Leopold Wilhelm of Austria

=== Prince-Bishopric of Liège ===
Prince-Bishop – Ferdinand of Bavaria (died 13 September); succeeded by Maximilian Henry of Bavaria

== Events ==
- 5 January – Governor General Leopold William issues decree for the conservation of Nieppe Forest
- 22 January – Jean-Baptiste della Faille appointed president of the Council of Flanders
- 13 April – City of Brussels confirms the statutes of the College of Medicine (established 1649) after appeals from apothecaries against its jurisdiction over medicines.
- 20 April – Governor General Leopold William lays the foundation stone of the new pilgrimage church in Jezus-Eik
- 28 May – City of Antwerp imposes speed limits on wagons travelling within the city
- 25 June – Two Englishmen arrested as thieves escape from Het Steen in Antwerp
- 14 July – Decree against counterfeit coin imported into the Spanish Netherlands from the territory of Liège
- 16 July – New regulations issued for the book trade in the city of Brussels
- 24 November – City of Antwerp prohibits the shooting of firearms within the city after the ringing of the bell for the closing of the city gates.
- 17 December – Treaty of navigation and commerce concluded between Philip IV of Spain and the Dutch Republic

== Art and architecture ==
Buildings

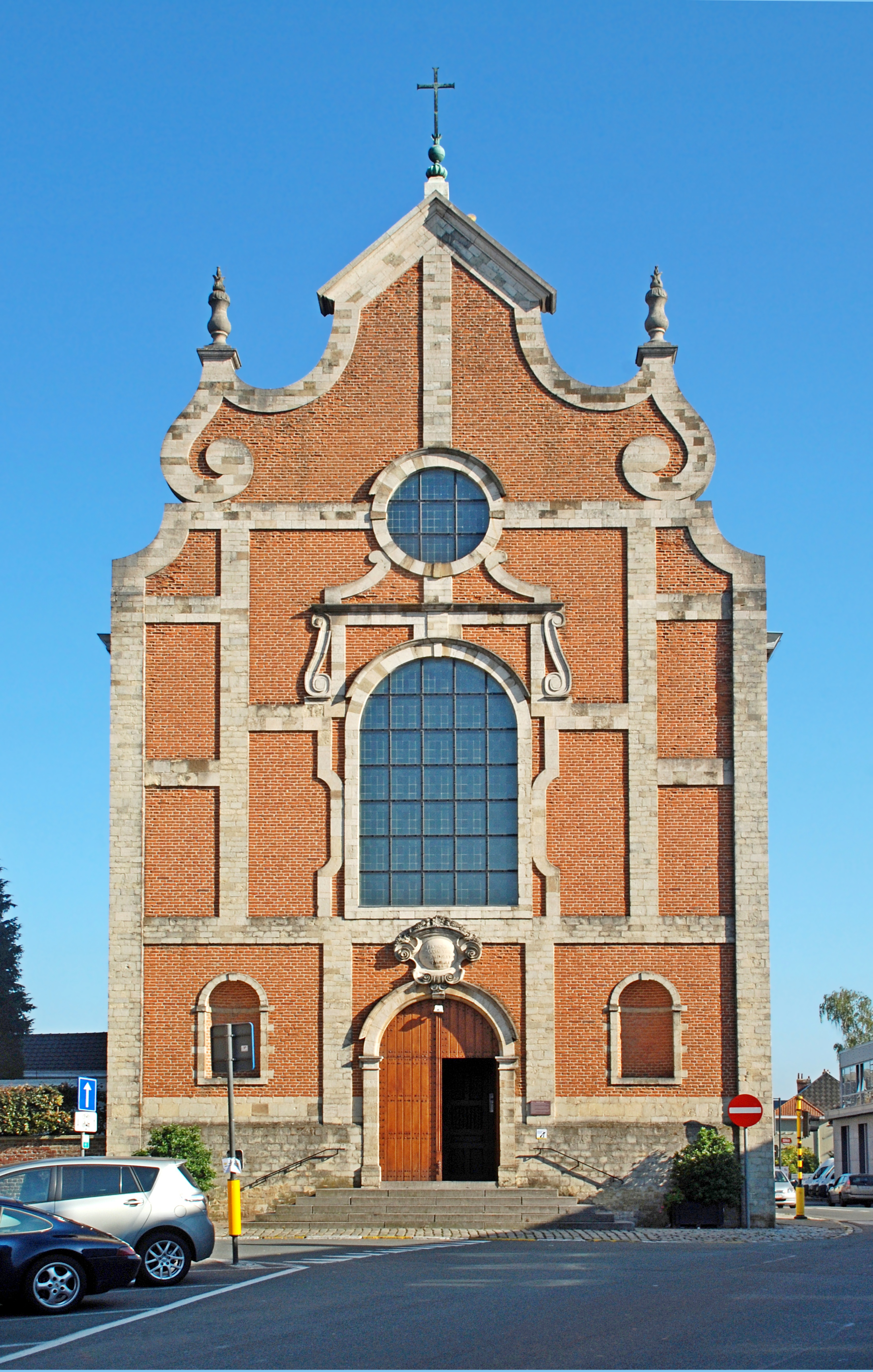
Church of Our Lady, Jezus-Eik

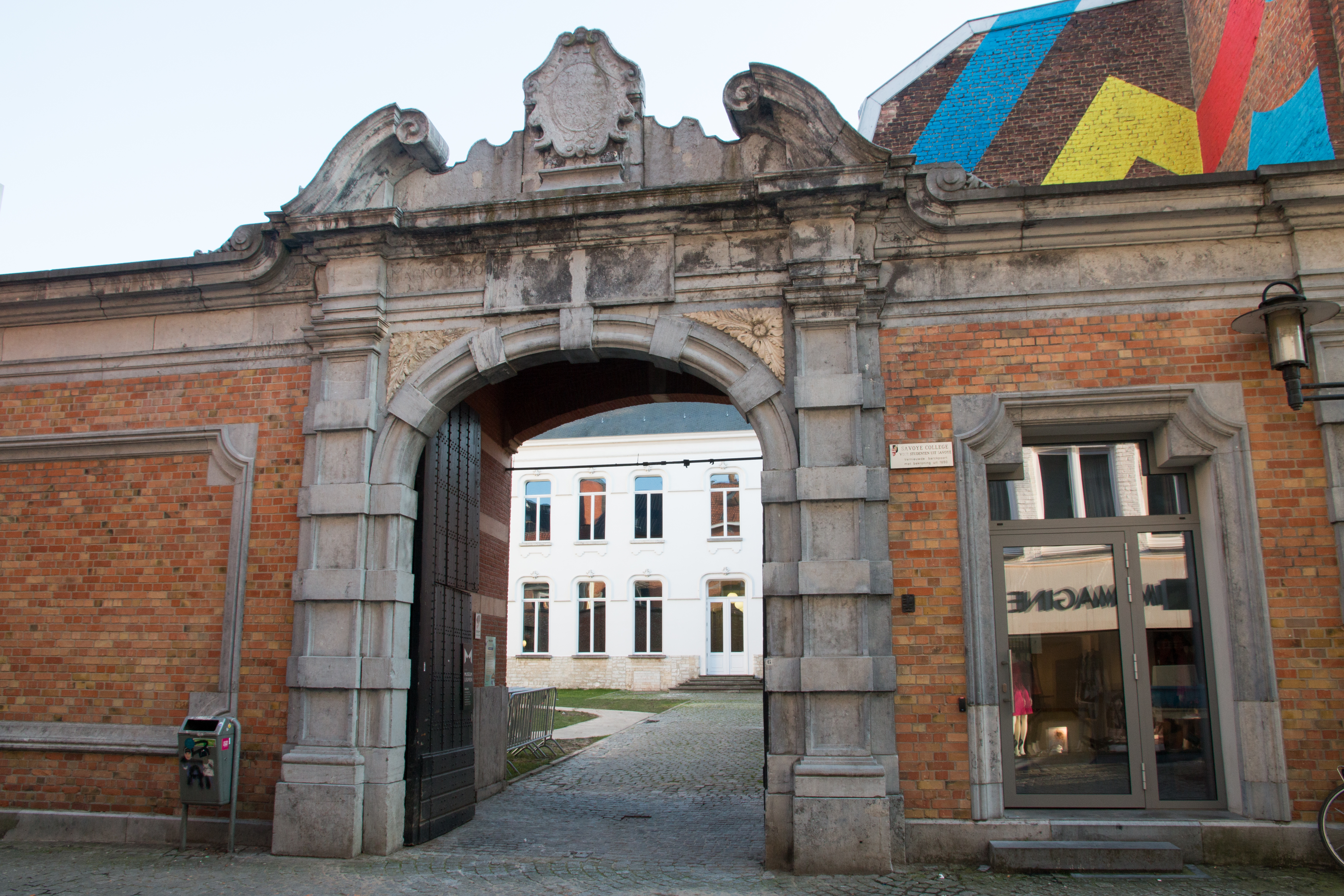
Entrance gate to Savoy College, Leuven

- Work begins on Church of Our Lady, Jezus-Eik, to designs attributed to Jacob Franquart
- Cloister of St. Bernard's Abbey, Hemiksem, completed
- Entrance gate to Savoy College, Leuven

Paintings

Cornelis de Bryer, Still Life, c. 1650 (Bonnefantenmuseum)

- Cornelis de Bryer, Still Life of Grapes, Roemer and Bread (c. 1650)
- Jacob Jordaens, Allegorical Portrait of a Family (c. 1650)

== Publications ==
- Recueil des traittez de paix, treves et neutralité entre les couronnes d'Espagne et de France (second edition, Antwerp, Plantin Press)
- Francesco Amico, Cursus Theologice Scholastice, 9 volumes (Antwerp)
- Cornelis de Bie, Den groeyenden Lierschen blom-hof (Antwerp, Jacob II Mesens)
- Willebrord Bosschaerts, Διατριβαι de primis veteris Frisiae apostolis (Mechelen, Robert Jaye)
- Philippe Brasseur, Origines omnium Hannoniae Coenobiorum octo libris breviter digestae (Mons, Jean Havart)
- Jean Jacques Chifflet, Alsatia, jure proprietatis et protectionis, Philippo IV. regi catholico vindicata (Antwerp, Plantin Press)
- Jules Chifflet, Aula sacra principum Belgii; sive Commentarius historicus de capellae regiae in Belgio (Antwerp, Plantin Press)
- Jean de Chokier de Surlet, Facis historiarum (Liège, Léonard Streel)
- Joan de Grieck, Den wysen geck, uyt-deylende, soo oude, als nieuwe geestigheden (Ghent, C. Meyer)
- Olivier de Wree, Historiae comitum Flandriae libri prodromi duo (Bruges, Lucas van den Kerchove)
- Pierre Loycx, Oorspronck ende voortganck van S. Willebortsprochie buyten Antwerpen. Met een cort verhael van het leven vanden H. Willebrordus, ende mitsgaeders van het miraculeus beldt der Alderh. Moeder Godts Maria, aldaer berustende (Antwerp, Jacob Mesens)
- Lodewijk Makeblijde, Den vriendelijcken adieu in de swaere ende laetste reyse des doodts (Antwerp, Cornelis Woons)
- Pierre de Méan, Recueil des points marquez pour coustumes du pays de Liège (Liège, Léonard Streel)
- Gabriel Meurier, Thresor de sentences dorees dicts proverbes, refrains & dictions communs en quatre langues (latin, espagnol, thiois & françois) (Brussels, Hubert II Anthoine)
- Jan Mommaert, Het Brabandts nachtegaelken (Brussels, Jan Mommaert)
- Pierre Parisot, Linguae Gallicae institutiones ad usum iuventutis collegii Porcensis Lovanii (Leuven, Cornelis Coenesteyn)
- Matthias Pauli, De Leere des Hemels dat is de glorie des H. Cruys (Liège, Léonard Streel)
- Vincent Stochove, Voyage du Levant (Brussels, Huybrecht II Anthoon Velpius)
- Bernardinus Surius, Den godtvruchtighen pelgrim ofte Jerusalemsche reyse (Brussels, Jan Mommaert the Younger)
- Anthonius Triest, Rationes motivae ob quas visum fuit R.mo episcopo Gandensi non expedire in dioecesi sua Gandensi solitis solemnitatibus publicare certam bullam adversus librum defuncti R.mi episcopi Ipsrensis Iansenij (Ghent, anonymous)
- Arnout Van Geluwe, Catholijcken echo, ofte Waeren Gendtschen weder-galm, teghen de stemme van onse ghepretendeerde ghereformeerde eerste deel (Antwerp, Widow of Jan Cnobbaert)
- Arnout Van Geluwe, Het derde deel, vanden Catholycken echo, ofte waeren Gendtschen weder-galm teghen een ghepretendeert ghereformeert sermoon (Antwerp, Widow of Jan Cnobbaert)
- Arnout Van Geluwe, Kort verhael van een achthien-jarighe Hollandtsche reyse, ghewandelt van eenen Vlaemschen boer (Antwerp, widow of Jan Cnobbaert)
- Nicolaus Vernulaeus, Imperatorum symbola praeclaris regum, principumque nec-non variorum scriptorum exemplis illustrata (Leuven, Josse Coppens)
- Paul Weerts, Cort begryp vande vruchten die de Seraphinsche Ordre der Minder-Broeders inde vier deelen der werelt heeft ghedaan besonderlijck vande bekeeringhe vande nieuwe werelt (Antwerp, Arnout van Brakel)

Performances

- Absalon rebellis filius David mansuetus pater dabitur (Brussels, Hubert Antonius Velpius), performed at the Jesuit College in Brussels on 12 September
- Le balet du monde, accompagné d'une comedie en musique (Brussels, Huybrecht II Anthoon Velpius), performed at the palace in Brussels, Carnival 1650, to celebrate the royal wedding
- Gioseffo Zamponi, Ulisse all'isola di Circe (Brussels, Huybrecht II Anthoon Velpius), musical drama performed at the Palace in Brussels

Periodicals

- Den Ordinarissen Postilioen (Antwerp, Martin Binnart)
- Relations veritables, edited by Pierre Hugonet (Brussels, printed by Guillaume Scheybels to be sold by Guillaume Hacquebaud)

== Births ==
- 14 February – Jan van Helmont, painter (died between 1714 and 1734)
- 16 April – Hyacinthe-Marie de Brouchoven, statesman (died 1707)
- 21 October – Jean Bart, privateer (died 1702)
- 28 November – Jan Palfijn, obstetrician (died 1730)
- 18 December – Angelus d'Ongnies, clergyman (died 1722)

== Deaths ==
- 9 March – Joannes Storms (born 1559), mathematician
- 29 March – Cornelis Galle the Elder (born 1576), engraver
- 8 April – Pieter van Mol (born 1599), painter
- 12 June (burial) – Antoon Sallaert (born 1594), artist
- 13 September – Ferdinand of Bavaria (born 1577), Prince-Bishop of Liège
- 30 September – Christophe Butkens (born 1590), Cistercian

Date uncertain

- Philippe François de Croy (born 1609), nobleman
- Jan Janssens (born 1590), painter
- Hendrik Hondius I (1573–c. 1650), cartographer
- Martin Droeshout (1601–c. 1650), engraver
