= 1642 in Belgium =

- Decades: 1630s; 1650s
- See also: Other events of 1642; List of years in Belgium

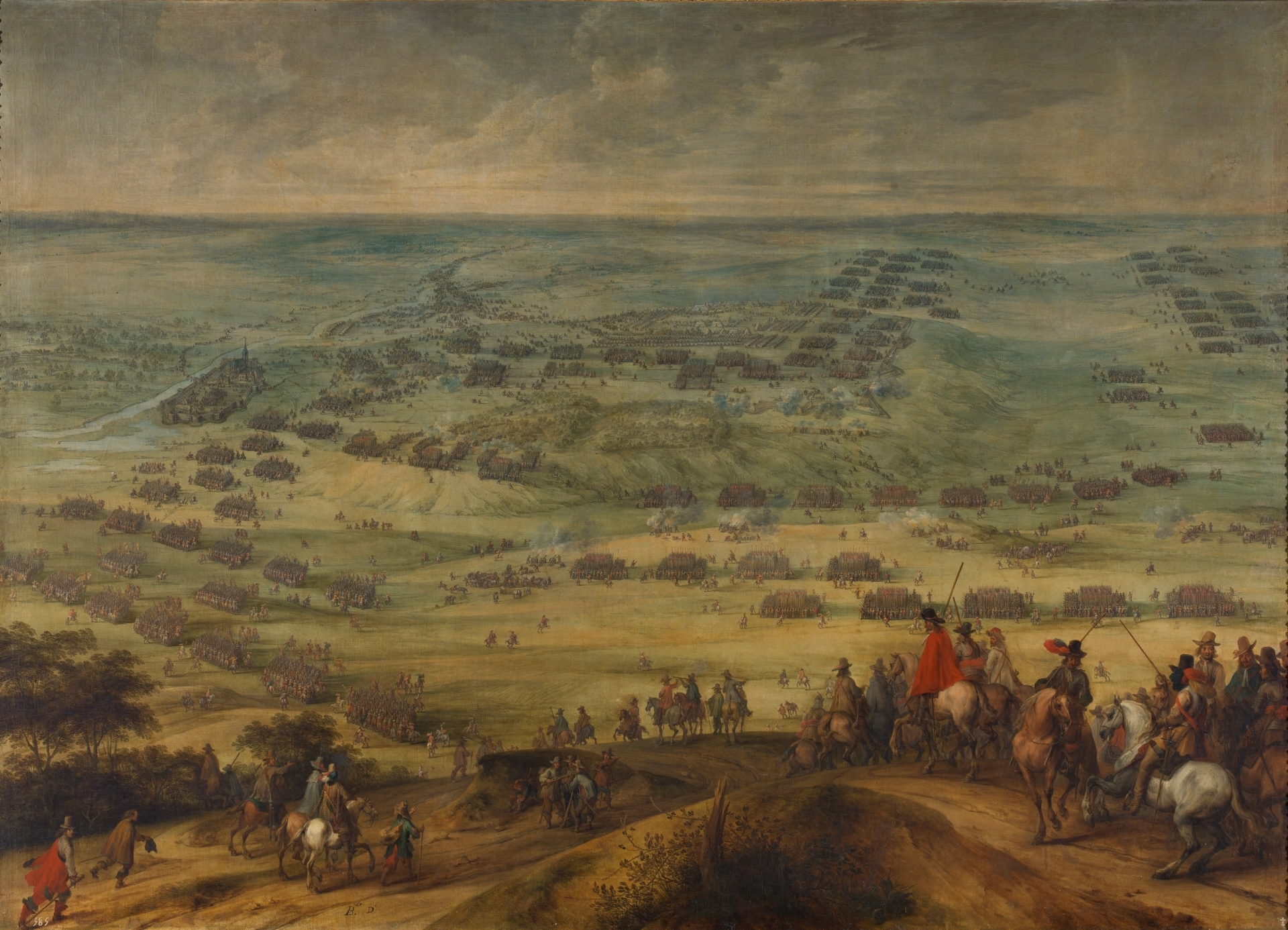
Pieter Snayers, The Battle of Honnecourt, 1642, Museo del Prado

Events in the year 1642 in the Spanish Netherlands and Prince-bishopric of Liège (predecessor states of modern Belgium).

== Incumbents ==
=== Habsburg Netherlands ===
Monarch – Philip IV, King of Spain and Duke of Brabant, of Luxembourg, etc.

Governor General (acting) – Francisco de Melo

=== Prince-Bishopric of Liège ===
Prince-Bishop – Ferdinand of Bavaria

== Events ==
The retaking of La Bassée in Flanders, 11 May 1642

- 6 March – Cornelius Jansen's Augustinus condemned by Pope Urban VIII.
- 24 April – Nicolaas de Haudion consecrated as bishop of Bruges
- 11 May – Army of Flanders recaptures La Bassée
- 26 May – Battle of Honnecourt
- 28 July – City of Antwerp banishes all foreign beggars.
- 20 December – City of Antwerp imposes speed restrictions on horsedrawn vehicles within the city.

== Art and architecture ==
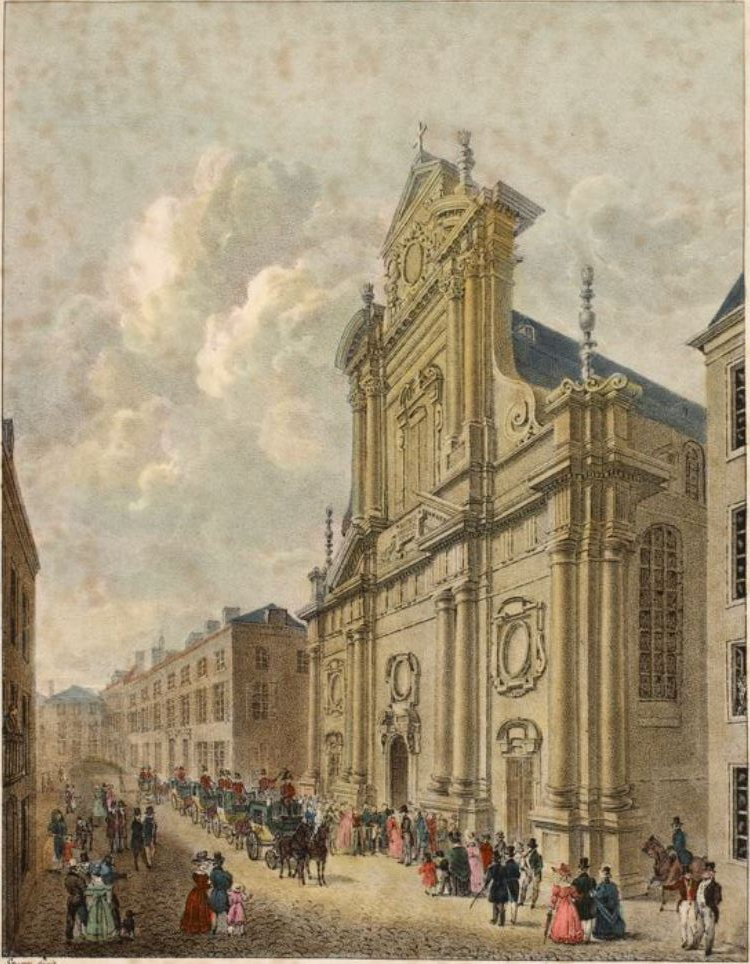
Former Augustinian Church, Brussels (1830)

Buildings

- Augustinian Church, Brussels

Paintings

Jacob Jordaens, Adam and Eve (1642), Toledo Museum of Art

- Jacob Jordaens, Adam and Eve

Prints

- La reprise de la Ville de La Bassee en Flandres

== Publications ==
Frontispiece of Gaspar Gevartius, Pompa Introitus Ferdinandi (1642)

- [anonymous], Jus Belgarum circa bullarum pontificarum receptionem (Liège)
- [anonymous], Processie ghenaempt omme-ganck oft kermisse van Mechelen onder welcke de reliquien vanden H. Romboudt om-gedragen worden (Mechelen, widow of Henry Jaye)
- Paul de Barry, La dévotion à Saint Joseph, le plus nymé el le plus aymable de tous les saints après Jésus et Marie (Liège, Jean Tournay)
- Pedro de Bivero, Bona et placida mors Infantis Cardinalis Ferdinandi (Brussels, Jan Mommaert)
- Andreas de Boeye, Levens vande heylighe patriarchen coninghen propheten ende andere treffelijcke persoonen van't oude Testament (Antwerp, Hendrick Aertssens)
- Joannes Busaeus, Den schadt der meditatien op alle de evangelien vande sondaghen ende heylighe-dagen vanden gheheelen iaere (Antwerp, Hendrick Aertssens)
- Juan Caramuel y Lobkowitz, Respuesta al manifiesto del reyno de Portugal (Antwerp, Plantin Press)
- Juan Caramuel y Lobkowitz, Joannes Bargantinus Lusitaniae illegitimus rex demonstratus (Leuven, Everardus De Witte)
- Juan Caramuel y Lobkowitz, Rationalis et realis philosophia (Leuven, Everardus De Witte)
- [Catholic Church], Roomsch martelaren-boeck, translated by Andreas de Boeye (Antwerp, widow of Jan Cnobbaert)
- Jean-Jacques Chifflet, Apologetica paraenesis ad linguam sanctam (Antwerp, Plantin Press)
- Jean-Jacques Chifflet, Dissertatio militaris de vexillo regali, in Casteletensi pugna Francis erepto, armis Philippi IV regis catholici, ductu Francisci de Mello (Antwerp, Plantin Press)
- Laurent Chifflet, Sommaire de la couronne de roses (Brussels, Hubert Anthoine Velpius)
- Laurent Chifflet, La parfaite alliance et mutuel secours de l´Eglise militante et de la souffrante à la table de Dieu (Bruxelles, chez Lucas de Meerbeeck)
- Jean-Jacques Courvoisier, Le prince immortel tiré sur la vie & la fin glorieuse de son altesse royale don Ferdinand d'Austriche (Antwerp, Caesar Joachim Trognaesius)
- Jean-Jacques Courvoisier, Le throsne royal de Jesus nazareen, roy des affligez (Antwerp, Caesar Joachim Trognesius)
- Charles Alexandre de Croÿ, Memoires guerriers de ce qu'y c'est passé aux Pays Bas depuis le commencement de l'an 1600 jusques à la fin de l'année 1606 (Antwerp, Hieronymus Verdussen)
- Jacques Damiens, Tableau racourci de ce qui s’est fait par la Compagnie de Jesus durant son premier siecle (Tournai, Adrien Quinqué)
- Patricius Duffius, Mercurius sive Nuntius Occidentalis de hodierno trium occidentalium regnorum Angliae, Hiberniae, et Scotiae statu (Leuven, Everardus De Witte)
- Gaspar Gevartius, Pompa introitus Ferdinandi Austriaci a S. P. Q. Antuerp. decreta et ornata; cum Antuerpiam auspicatissimo advento suo bearet, XV. kal. maii, ann. M.DC.XXXV (Antwerp, Willem Lesteens and Hendrick Aertssens, to be sold by Theodoor van Thulden)
- Jan Baptist van Helmont, Febrium doctrina inaudita (Antwerp, widow of Jan Cnobbaert)
- Alard Le Roy, Le Père de famille et ses obligations (Liège, Baudouin Bronckart)
- Lodewijk Makeblijde, Corte maniere, om stervende menschen by te staen: ende christelijck te helpen sterven (Ghent, Servaes Manilius)
- Charles de Mansfelt, Castra Dei: sive parochia, religio et disciplina militum (Brussels, Martinus van Bossuyt)
- Charles de Mansfelt, Sacerdotis breviculum venerationi cleri sacrum (Brussels, Martinus van Bossuyt)
- Pierre Marchant, Tribunal sacramentale et visibile animarum in hac vita mortali (Ghent, Bartholomeus Pauwels)
- Mathias Naveau, Conception funèbre sur le trespas du Serenissime Prince Ferdinand Cardinal Infant d’Espaigne, gowerneur des Pays Bas (Tournai, Adrien Quinqué)
- Joannes Ooghe, Het leven ende mirakelen van den heylighen Amandus apostel van Vlaenderen bisschop van Maestricht (Ghent, Gerlacus Graet)
- Jean Puget de la Serre, Het graf der wereltse vermaeckinghen; met de Morgen-wekker der jonck-vrouwen (Antwerp, widow of Jan Cnobbaert)
- Erycius Puteanus, Orchestra Burgundica, ducum Burgundiae elogia historica (Brussels, Jan Mommaert)
- Antonius Sanderus, Panegyricus sacer in templo B. Mariae virginis misericordiae matris Collegii Iprensis Societatis Jesu (Ypres, Philips de Lobel)
- Teresa of Ávila, The flaming hart or The life of the glorious S. Teresa (Antwerp, Joannes Meursius)
- Nicolaus Vernulaeus, Munus parentale piis manibus gloriossimae memoriae serenissimi principis Fernandi D. G. Infantis Hispaniarum S. R. E. cardinalis Belgii Burgundiaeque gubernatoris sacrum (Leuven, Jacob Zegers)
- Richard Verstegan, Recreative beschrijvinghe, van de proprieteyten oft eyghendommen, van de differente soorten van ambachtslieden. Dienende in stede van medicamenten, teghen die melancolie (Antwerp, widow of Jeremias van Ghelen)
- Lambertus Vossius, Aerme-liën-kermis door de milde aelmoesse wt-ghereyckt aen twee-hondert schaemele mans ende vrauwen, by den seer doorluchtighen ende eerweirdighsten heere, H. Antonius Triest (Bruges, Jan-Baptist and Lucas van den Kerchove)
- Olivier de Wree, La généalogie des comtes de Flandre depuis Baudouin bras de fer iusques à Philippe IV roy d'Espagne (Bruges, Jan Baptiste van den Kerchove and Lucas van den Kerchove)

Almanacs

- Philips de Dyn, Almanach voor het Jaer ons Heeren M.DC.XXXXJJJ (Ghent, Gerlacus Graet)
- Henricus Kilianus, Almanach voor het jaer ons Heeren M.DC.XLII (Antwerp, widow of Jan Cnobbaert)

News pamphlets

- Apologie du fidel Liégeois pour la neutralité du pays de Liège contre un livret intitulé La Justice des armes de Son Altèze de Hesse (Liège, Christian Ouwerx) — a reply to La justice des armes de Son Altesse de Hesse contre l'Evesque et Pays de Liège (anonymous)
- Catholicorum Hyberniae confaederatorum humilia postulata (Leuven, Bernardinus Masius)
- Copia de Carta de un Capitan de la Armada Catholica a su Amigo de Brusselas: Con Breve Relacion de la Victoria de Chastelet (anonymous)
- Manifeste et articles que les catholiques confederez d'Irlande demandent au serenissime Charles leur roy (Brussels, Huybrecht II Anthoon Velpius)
- La reprise de la ville de Lens en Artois, par les armes de S.M. Catholique sous la conduite de son excellence don Francisco de Mello, comte d´Assumar (Brussels, Hubert Anthoine Velpius)
- Suite des succes de l'armee de sa Maieste sous le commandement de don Francisco de Mello (Brussels, Hubert Anthoine Velpius)

Newspapers

- Extraordinarisse Post-tijdinghe (Antwerp, Willem Verdussen)
- Nieuwe Tydinghen uyt verscheyde ghewesten (Bruges, Nicolaes Breyghel)
- Den Ordinarissen Postilioen (Antwerp, Martin Binnart)
- Le Postillon ordinaire (Antwerp, Martin Binnart)

== Births ==
- 4 January – Philippe Pierson, Jesuit missionary (died 1688)
- 25 February – Albert de Hornes, bishop of Ghent (died 1694)
- 27 April – Francisque Millet, painter (died 1679)
- 26 October (baptism) – Maria Tassaert, painter (died after 1665)
- 22 December – Guillaume-Philippe, Marquess of Herzelles, politician (died 1698)

== Deaths ==
- 21 January – Matthew Kellison (born c. 1560), clergyman and educator
- 6 May – Frans Francken the Younger (born 1581), painter
- 9 May – Jacques Bonfrère (born 1573), Bible scholar
- 8 September – Herman de Neyt (born 1588), art dealer
- 13 September – Mary Percy (born 1570), abbess
- 3 October (buried) – David Rijckaert II (born 1586), painter
- 22 October – Nicasius Bax (born 1581), educator
- 21 December – Bernard Campmans (date of birth unknown), Abbot of Dunes
