= 1643 in Belgium =

- Decades: 1630s; 1650s
- See also: Other events of 1643; List of years in Belgium

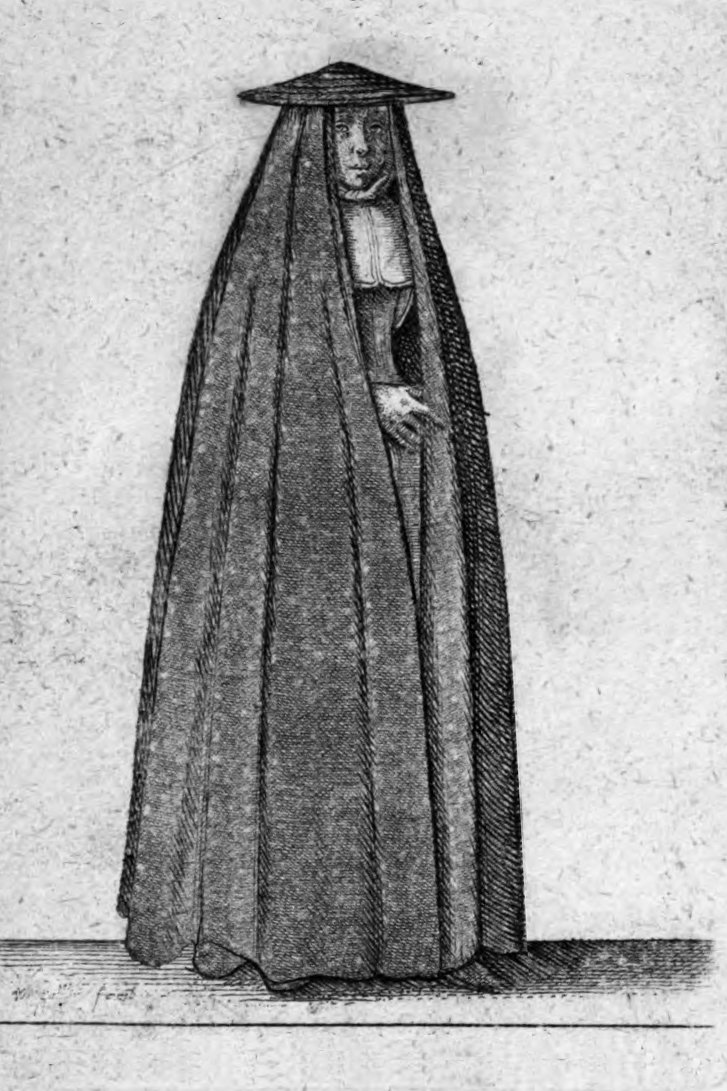
A woman of Antwerp, Theatrum Mulierum (London, 1643)

Events in the year 1643 in the Spanish Netherlands and Prince-bishopric of Liège (predecessor states of modern Belgium).

== Incumbents ==
=== Habsburg Netherlands ===
Monarch – Philip IV, King of Spain and Duke of Brabant, of Luxembourg, etc.

Governor General (acting) – Francisco de Melo

=== Prince-Bishopric of Liège ===
Prince-Bishop – Ferdinand of Bavaria

== Events ==
- 14 February – Body of Marie de' Medici arrives in Liège on its journey to France
- 10 March – City of Antwerp issues regulations for teachers of Sunday schools
- 21 April – Maximilien Villain presides over a diocesan synod of the Diocese of Tournai
- 18 May – Magistrates of Ypres prohibit the lodging of strangers
- 19 May – Battle of Rocroi
- 20 June – Spanish envoy to The Hague presents a proposal for a ceasefire, which the States General reject
- 3 June – Royal proclamation renewing the privileges and exemptions of Bandes d'ordonnance
- 26 August – Brussels Council of Finances issues specifications of coins to be considered legal tender.
- 20 December – Ottavio Piccolomini appointed commander in chief of the Army of Flanders

== Art and architecture ==
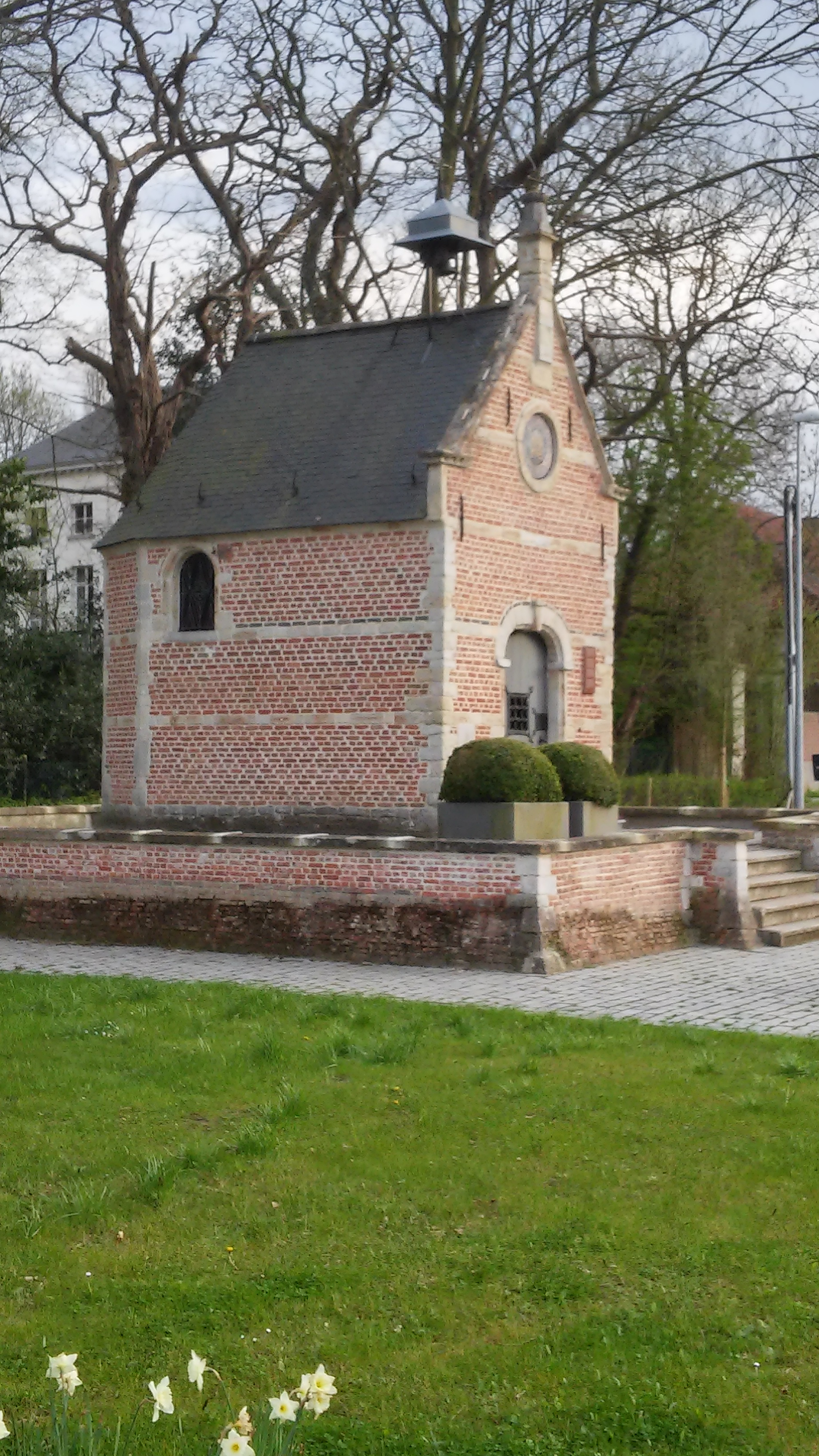
Chapel of Our Lady of the Thorn, Heffen

Buildings

- Chapel of Our Lady of the Thorn, Heffen, built to house a miraculous image of the Blessed Virgin Mary that had previously been attached to a tree

Paintings

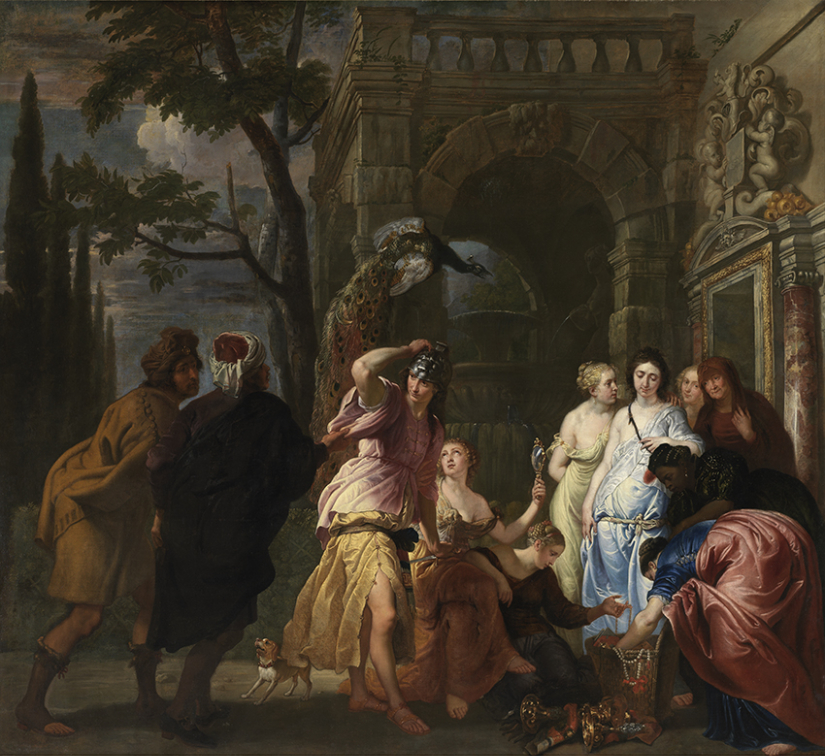
Erasmus Quellinus the Younger, Achilles among the Daughters of Lycomedes, 1643 (Groeningemuseum)

- Erasmus Quellinus the Younger, Achilles among the Daughters of Lycomedes (Groeningemuseum)

== Publications ==
- Valerius Andreas, Bibliotheca Belgica de Belgis vita scriptisq. Claris. Praemissa topographica Belgii totius seu Germaniae inferioris descriptione (Leuven, Jacob Zegers)
- Jean Bolland (ed.), Acta Sanctorum, vols. 1 and 2, January (Jan van Meurs)
- Boetius à Bolswert, Duyfkens en Willemynkens pelgrimagie tot haren beminden binnen Jerusalem (Antwerp, Hendrick Aertssens)
- Willem van der Borcht, Spieghel der eyghen-kennisse in-gheknoopt het conterfeytsel des wereldts (Brussels, Lambert de Grieck)
- Juan Caramuel y Lobkowitz, Bernardi doctoris melliflui elimatum ad regulam benedictinam scholion quod inscribitur (Leuven, Everardus de Witte)
- Jean Jacques Chifflet (ed.), Recueil des traittez de paix, trèves et neutralité entre les couronnes d'Espagne et de France (Antwerp, Plantin Press under Balthasar Moretus)
- Jean de Chokier de Surlet, Theaurus Politicorum Aphorosmorum repetiae lectionis (Liège, Léonard Streel)
- Michael Clery, Idiomatis Hibernici Vocabularium (Leuven, Irish College)
- Georges Galopin, Flandria generosa, seu Compendiosa series genealogiae comitum Flandriae (Mons, heirs of François Waudré)
- Jacinto de Herrera y Sotomayor, La comedia de la reyna de las flores loa y entremes, que representaron en el palacio de Bruselas, dia de los reyes, de este año de 1643 (Brussels, Jan Mommaert)
- Hendrik Hondt, Summa juris canonici (Antwerp, Hieronymus II Verdussen)
- Lucas van Lathem, Historie der miraculeuse kercke van onse L. vrouvwe tot Alsenberghe (Brussels, Guilliam Scheybels)
- Lucas van Lathem, Histoire de la dévote et miraculeuse église de N. Dame d'Alsemberghe (Brussels)
- Pierre Marchant, Tribunal sacramentale et visibile Animarum in hac vita mortali (Antwerp, Petrus Bellerus)
- Francisco Manuel de Mello, De successione Regni Portugalliae dissertatio juridica (Bruges, Nicolaes Breyghel)
- Mathieu de Morgues, Charitable remontrance de Caton chrestien au cardinal de Richelieu (Antwerp)
- Mathieu de Morgues, Les deux faces de la vie et de la mort de Marie de Medicis royne de France, vefue de Henry IV, mere de Louis XIII, roys tres-chrestiens, discours funebre (Antwerp, Plantin Press)
- Pierre d'Outreman, Constantinopolis belgica, sive de rebus gestis a Balduino et Henrico Impp. Constantinopolitanis (Tournai, Adrien Quinqué)
- Matthias Pauli, Sonderlinghen troost der geloovighe zielen (Liège, Léonard Streel)
- Erycius Puteanus, Politica empresa (Antwerp, Balthasar II Moretus)
- Heribert Rosweyde, Het leven der H.H. maeghden die van Christus tijden tot dese eeuwe inden salighen staet der suyverheydt inde wereldt gheleeft hebben (Antwerp, widow of Jan Cnobbaert)
- Stanislaw Sokolowski, Officia propria patronorum regni Poloniae (Antwerp, Plantin Press under Balthasar Moretus)
- Vincent Stochove, Voyage du sieur de Stochove faict es années 1630. 1631. 1632. 1633 (Brussels, Huybrecht II Anthoon Velpius)
- Johannes Wamesius, Responsorum sive consiliorum de jure pontificio (Leuven, Jacob Zegers)
- Godefridus Wendelinus, Luminarcani arcanorum caelestium lampas τετραλυχνος, quatuor obvelata hexametris quatuor anagrammatismis revelata (Brussels, Jan Mommaert the Younger)
- Johannes Wiggers, In tertiam partem divi Thomæ Aquinatis commentaria Ioannis Wiggers. De verbo incarnato (Leuven, Cornelis Coenesteyn)
- Olivier de Wree, Genealogiae comitum Flandriae, vol. 2 (Bruges, Jan Baptiste van den Kerchove and Lucas van den Kerchove)

Newspapers

- Nieuwe Tydinghen uyt verscheyde ghewesten (Bruges, Nicolaes Breyghel)

== Births ==
Date uncertain

- Laurens van der Meulen, artist (died 1719)

== Deaths ==
- 23 April (burial) – Adriaan van Meerbeeck (born 1560), chronicler
- 19 May – Paul-Bernard de Fontaines (born 1566), commander
- 30 June – Gertruida van Veen (born 1602), painter
- 18 July – François Duquesnoy (born 1597), sculptor

Date uncertain

- Maria Faydherbe (born 1587), sculptor
- Marten Pepijn (born 1575), painter
