= 1649 in Belgium =

- Decades: 1630s; 1650s
- See also: Other events of 1649; List of years in Belgium

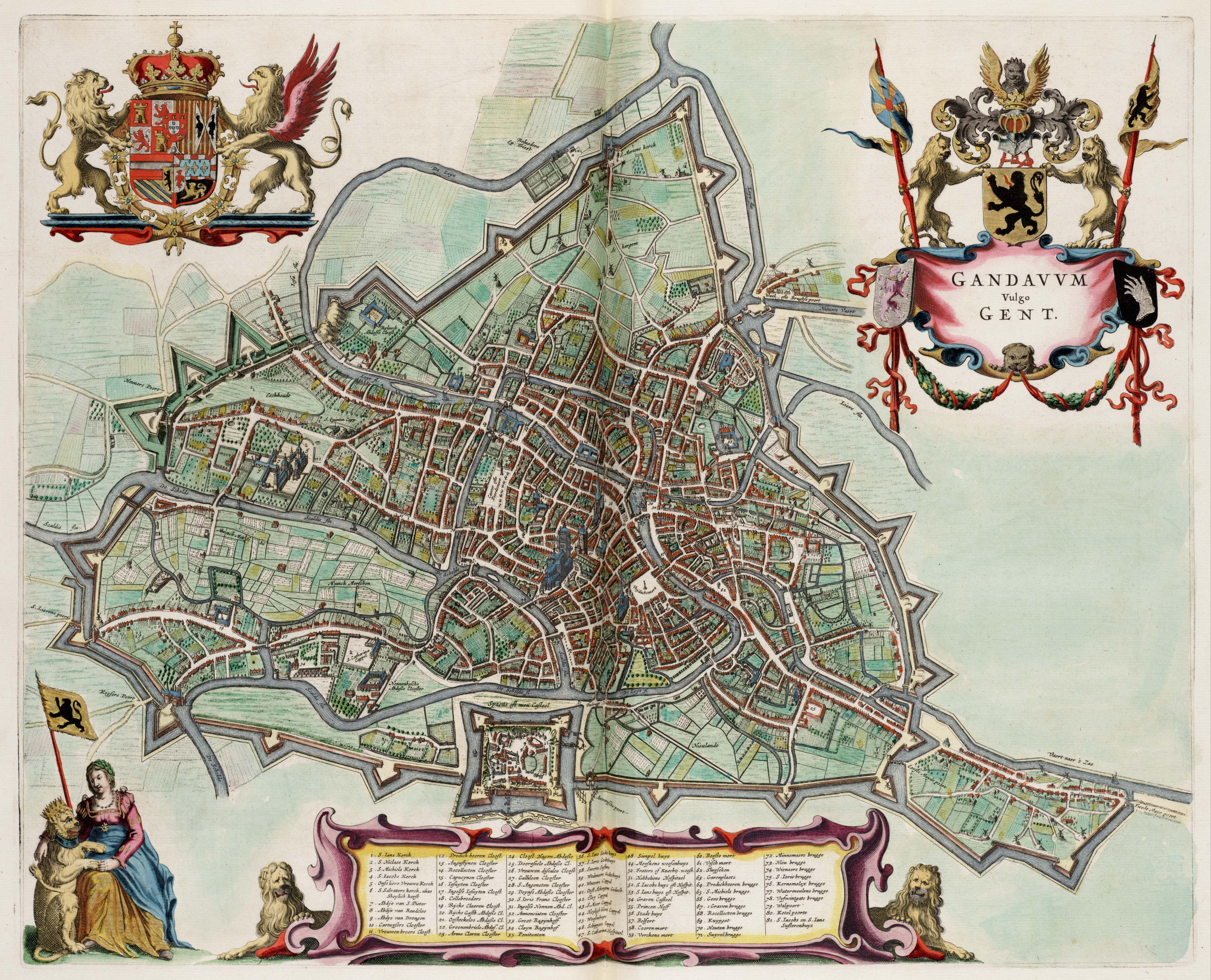
Joan Blaeu, Map of Ghent (1649)

Events in the year 1649 in the Spanish Netherlands and Prince-bishopric of Liège (predecessor states of modern Belgium).

== Incumbents ==
=== Habsburg Netherlands ===
Monarch – Philip IV, King of Spain and Duke of Brabant, of Luxembourg, etc.

Governor General – Archduke Leopold Wilhelm of Austria

=== Prince-Bishopric of Liège ===
Prince-Bishop – Ferdinand of Bavaria

== Events ==
- 31 May – Leopold Wilhelm lays the foundation stone of a new Lady Chapel in Brussels Minster
- 30 August – Liège surrenders to Bavarian troops
- 24 September – Ferdinand of Bavaria makes his triumphal entry into Liège

== Art and architecture ==
Buildings

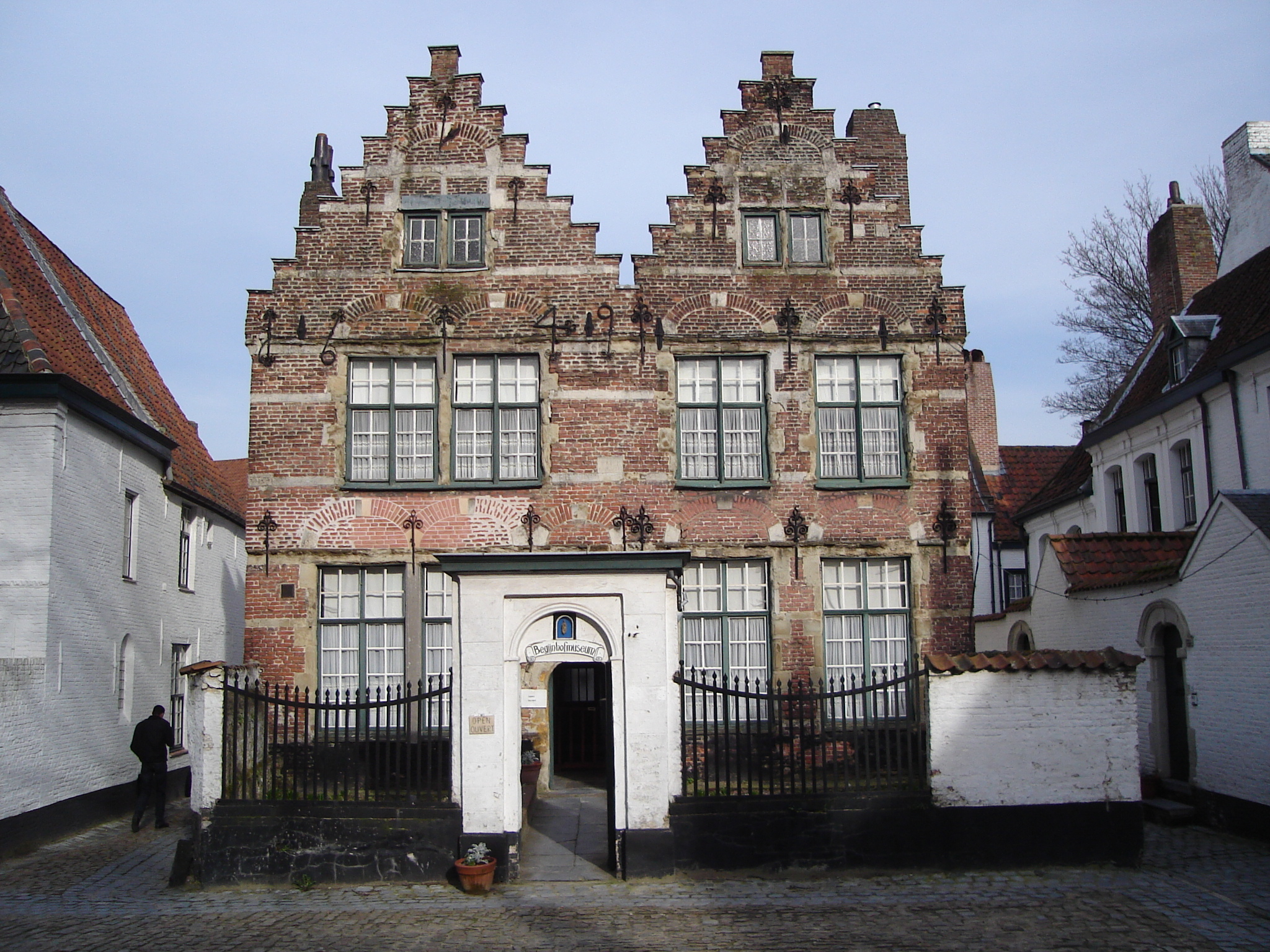
House of the Mistress of the Kortrijk Beguinage

- St Elizabeth House, residence of the mistress of the Kortrijk Beguinage

== Publications ==
- L'execution et la mort du roy d'Angleterre faite publiquement le 9. febr. 1649 à Londres en Angleterre, avec ce que le roy a dit sur l'eschaffaut (Antwerp, Martin Binnart).
- Libertus Fromondus, Responsum rythmicum refutans cuiusdam molinistae epistolam ad aliquot (ut contumeliosè fingit) illuminatos Lovanienses (published anonymously)
- Adriaan Poirters, Het masker vande wereldt afgetrocken (Antwerp, widow of Jan Cnobbaert and heirs of Jan Cnobbaert)

Periodicals

- Den Ordinarissen Postilioen (Antwerp, Martin Binnart)
- Le Postillon ordinaire (Antwerp, Martin Binnart)
- Courrier véritable des Pays-Bas, edited by Pierre Hugonet (Brussels, printed by Jan Mommaert the Younger)

== Births ==
- 25 February (baptised) – Franciscus Gijsbrechts, painter (died after 1677)
- 15 August (baptised) – Godfried Maes, painter (died 1700)

Date uncertain

- Gualterus Gysaerts, painter (died in or after 1677)
- Emmanuel Schelstrate, theologian (died 1692)
- Jan Carel van Eyck, painter (year of death uncertain)

== Deaths ==
- 6 January – Nicolaus Vernulaeus (born 1583), humanist
- February – Theodoor van Loon (born 1581/82), painter
- 2 September – Abraham Matthijs (born 1581), painter
- 24 September – Nicolaas de Haudion (date of birth unknown), bishop
- 17 October – Lodewijck Neeffs (born 1617), painter
- 24 November – Ferdinand de Boisschot (born 1570), jurist

Date uncertain

- Jan Baptist Barbé (born 1578), engraver
