= Sturmius =

Sturmius may refer to:

- Saint Sturm (c. 705 – 779), missionary and founder of Fulda monastery
- latinized for Johannes Sturm (1507–1589), German humanist
- John Christopher Sturmius (1635–1703), German mathematician
- Joannes Sturmius Mechlinianus (1559–1650), Belgian poet and mathematician
