= Sigillography =

Study of seals

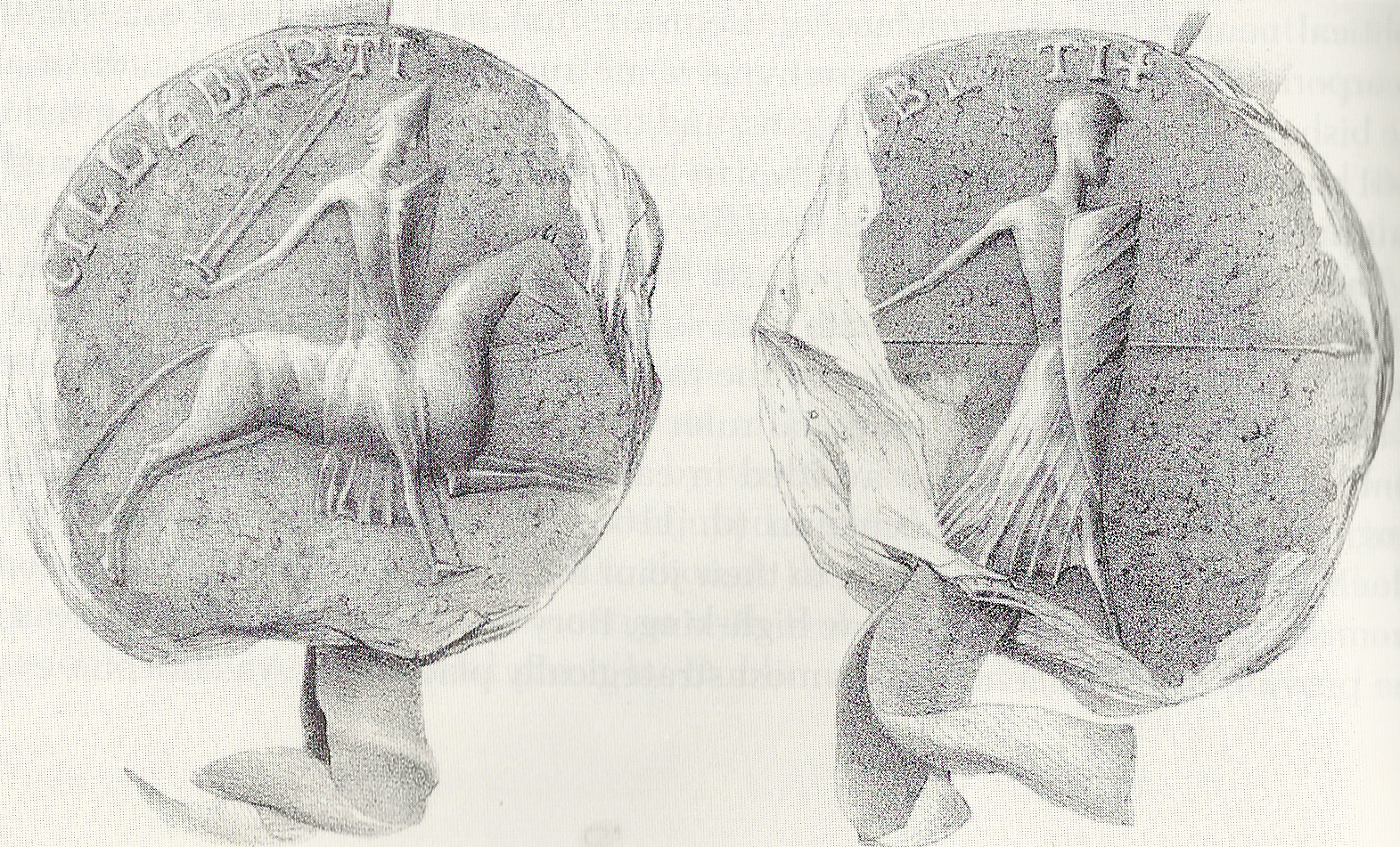
19th-century drawings of the seal of Richard de Clare ("Strongbow"), Earl of Pembroke (1130–1176)

Sigillography, also known by its Greek-derived name, sphragistics, is the scholarly discipline that studies the wax, lead, clay, and other seals used to authenticate archival documents. It investigates not only aspects of the artistic design and production of seals (both matrices and impressions), but also considers the legal, administrative and social contexts in which they were used. It has links to diplomatics, heraldry, social history, and the history of art, and is regarded as one of the auxiliary sciences of history. A student of seals is known as a sigillographer.

== Etymology ==
The word sigillography derives from the Latin word sigillum, meaning 'seal', and the Greek suffix γραφή, meaning 'description'. It was effectively coined in Italian (as sigillografia) by Anton Stefano Cartari in 1682. It entered English at a much later date: the earliest instances recorded by the Oxford English Dictionary date from 1879 (sigillography) and 1882 (sigillographer). The alternative term, sphragistics, is derived from the Greek word σϕρᾱγίς, meaning 'seal': this word is first recorded in English in 1836.

== History ==
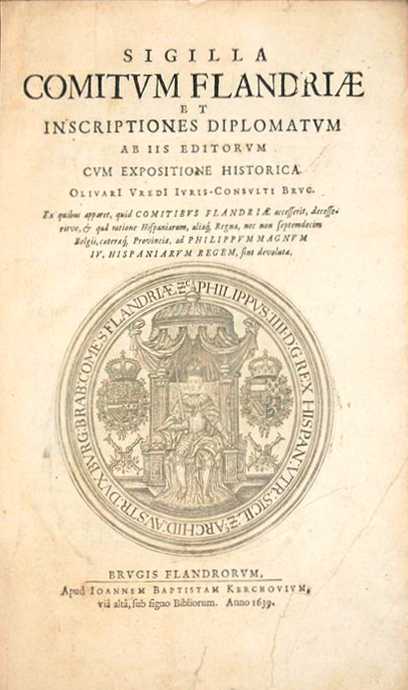
Title page of Olivier de Wree's Sigilla comitum Flandriae (1639)

Antiquaries such as Thomas Elmham and John Rous began to record and to discuss the historic use of seals in the 15th century. In the 16th and 17th centuries the consideration of seals became a fairly widespread antiquarian activity. Notable early students and collectors included Robert Glover, John Dee, Sir Robert Cotton and Nicolas-Claude de Peiresc.

The first published treatises dedicated to seals included Giorgio Longo's De anulis signatoriis antiquorum (Milan, 1615); Olivier de Wree's Sigilla comitum Flandriae (Bruges, 1639); and Theodorus Hoepingk's De sigillorum prisco et novo jure tractatus (Nuremberg, 1642). Especially influential in shaping the discipline were Jean Mabillon's De re diplomatica (1681) and Johann Michael Heineccius' De veteribus Germanorum aliarumque nationum sigillis (1710). In England, John Anstis compiled a substantial study titled "Aspilogia", but this remained in manuscript: the first work to reach print was a much slighter tract by John Lewis, Dissertation on the Antiquity and Use of Seals in England (1740). In the second half of the 19th century sigillography was further developed by German scholars including Hermann Grotefend and Otto Posse, and French scholars including Louis Douët d'Arcq and Germain Demay.

Sigillography is also an important subdiscipline of Byzantine studies, involving the study of Byzantine lead seal impressions and the text and images thereon. Its importance derives from both the scarcity of surviving Byzantine documents themselves, and from the large number (over 40,000) of extant seals. One of the largest compendiums of Byzantine seals can be found in the large volume by Gustave Schlumberger, Sigillographie de l'empire Byzantin, published in 1904.

The first international colloquium on Byzantine sigillography was held at Dumbarton Oaks in August 1986.

== Popular culture ==
Sigillography features in the plot of King Ottokar's Sceptre (1939/1947), one of The Adventures of Tintin. Tintin accompanies Professor Alembick, a sigillographer, on a research trip to the fictional Balkan nation of Syldavia, only to become embroiled in a plot to dethrone the King.

== See also ==
- Heraldry
- Emblem
