= Overijse =

- Municipality
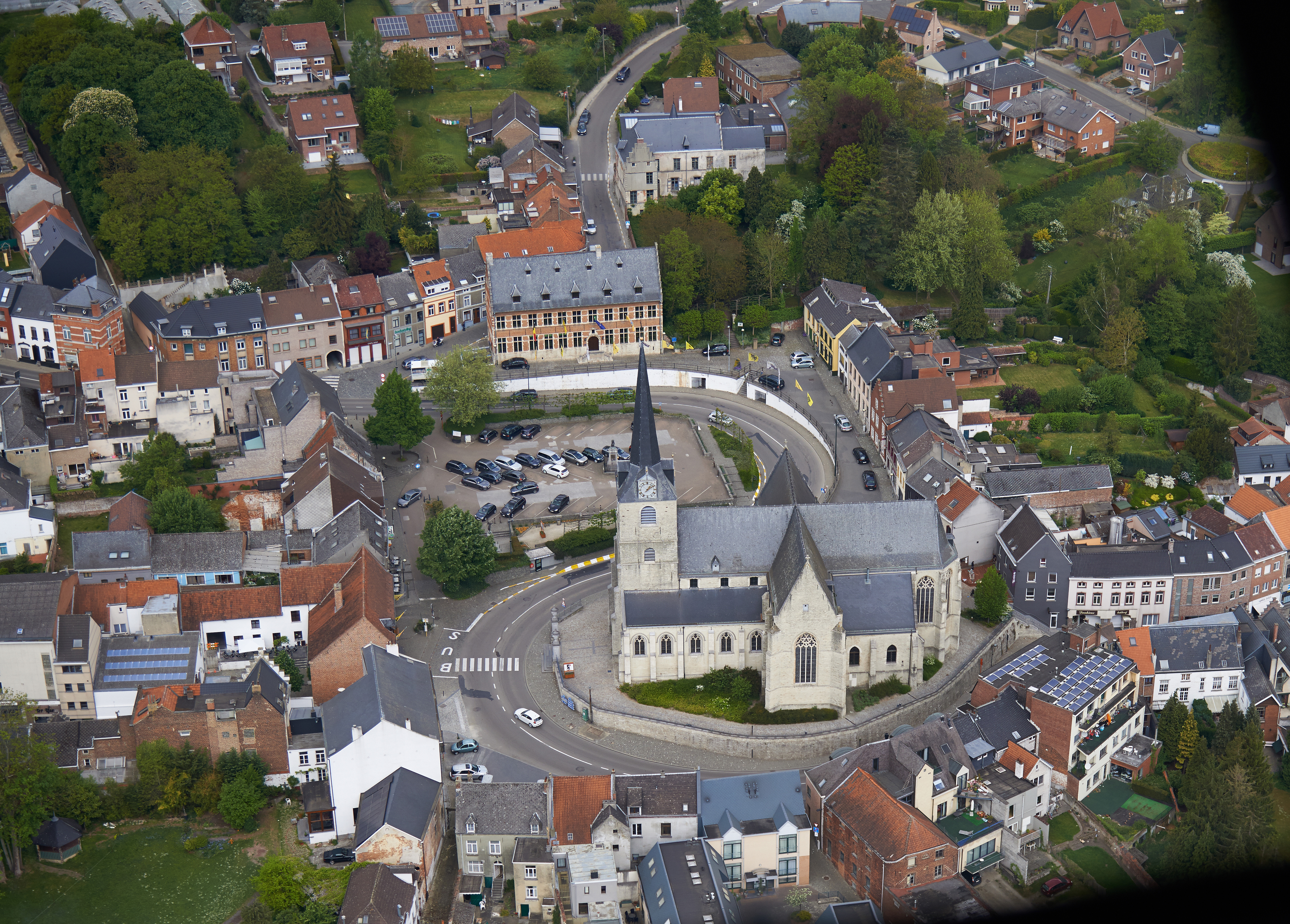

- Flag Coat of arms

- Location of Overijse in Flemish Brabant
- Interactive map of Overijse
- Location in Belgium
- Coordinates: 50°46′N 04°32′E
- Country: Belgium
- Community: Flemish Community
- Region: Flemish Region
- Province: Flemish Brabant
- Arrondissement: Halle-Vilvoorde

Government
  - Mayor: Inge Lenseclaes (Overijse 2002-N-VA-CD&V)
  - Governing parties: Overijse 2002-N-VA-CD&V, DynamiekvoorOverijse

Area
  - Total: 44.99 km^{2} (17.37 sq mi)

Population (2018-01-01)
  - Total: 25,169
  - Density: 559.4/km^{2} (1,449/sq mi)
- Postal codes: 3090
- NIS code: 23062
- Area codes: 02, 016
- Website: www.overijse.be

Overijse (Dutch pronunciation: [ˈoːvərɛisə]) is a municipality in the province of Flemish Brabant, in the Flemish region of Belgium. It is a suburb of the wider Brussels metropolitan area. The municipality comprises the town of Overijse proper, and the communities of Eizer, Maleizen, Jezus-Eik, Tombeek and Terlanen. On January 1, 2023, Overijse had a total population of 25,962. The total area is 44.99 km^{2} (17.37 sq mi), which gives a population density of 549/km^{2} (1,420/sq mi). Overijse is surrounded by an extensive woodlands (Sonian Forest), with paths for walking and cycling.

The official language of Overijse is Dutch. The municipality is home to a minority of French-speaking residents and, according to a 2023 census, to 4,389 expatriates including 716 Dutch, 402 French, 389 Romanians, 306 Polish and 281 Germans.

In 1952, Albert Lootvoet, a local brewer started brewing Leffe beer. The Leffe beers were brewed in Overijse from 1952 until 1977, when the Artois breweries bought out the local brewer.

== History ==
Overijse draws its name from the nearby river, the IJse, that flows through the region. The name may be interpreted as Trans-IJse as contrasted to Cis-IJse. The oldest known name is Isca; the word is likely Celtic in origin, and translated means 'Water'.

Overijse was the birthplace of the 16th century humanist Justus Lipsius, a professor at Leuven university who was a friend of the printer and publisher Plantin.

== Events ==
Overijse has a traditional festival every year, held in August (Druivenfeesten). The festival commemorates the industry that shaped the area, namely cultivation of grapes (Dutch druiven). The Druivenkoers Overijse is a single-day road bicycle race during the festival. The Vlaamse Druivencross is a December cyclo-cross classic race.

== Attractions ==
Historical sites include:

- The Late Gothic St. Martinus Church with the nave (1489), the choir (1520), and quasi Romanesque towers from the 12th century.
- IJse Castle (17th century) with a 16th-century facade and a 15th-century hunting pavilion; against the castle walls Kellebron from the 13th century.
- Townhouse (1503–1505), restored in 1963.
- By the beguinage (1264), a 15th-century Gothic castle.
- In the village of Tombeek, the 16th-century Bisdom Castle with 12th-century towers.
- Also in Tombeek, the Sanatorium Joseph Lemaire (1937), a modern building from architect Maxime Brunfaut.
- In the village of Jezus-Eik, the Baroque Onze Lieve Vrouwekerk (Our Beloved Lady Church) with a choir from 1650 and a nave from 1667, restored in 2007.
- Near Overijse there is a medium wave transmitter for the Belgian foreign radio service.
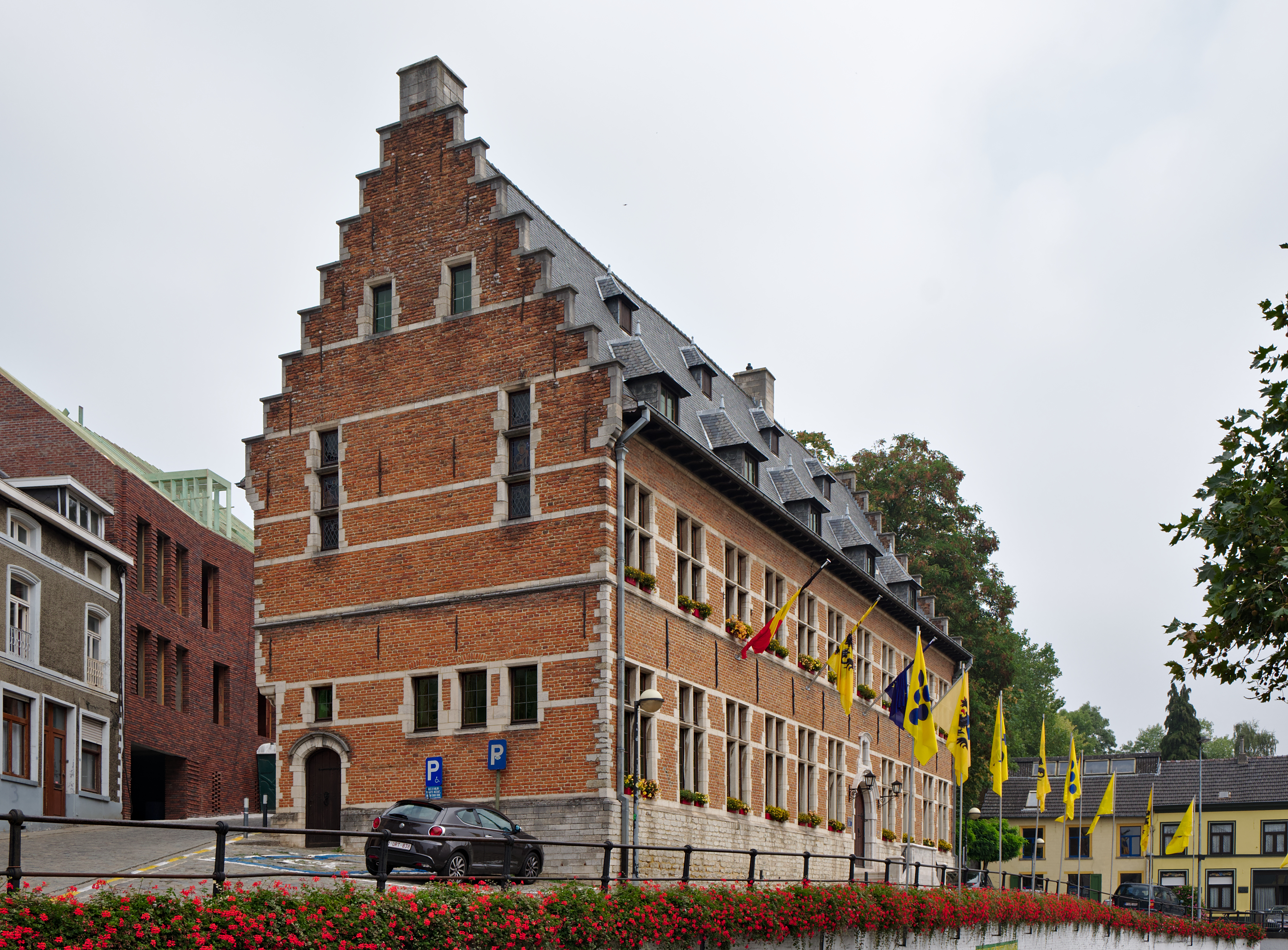
Town Hall

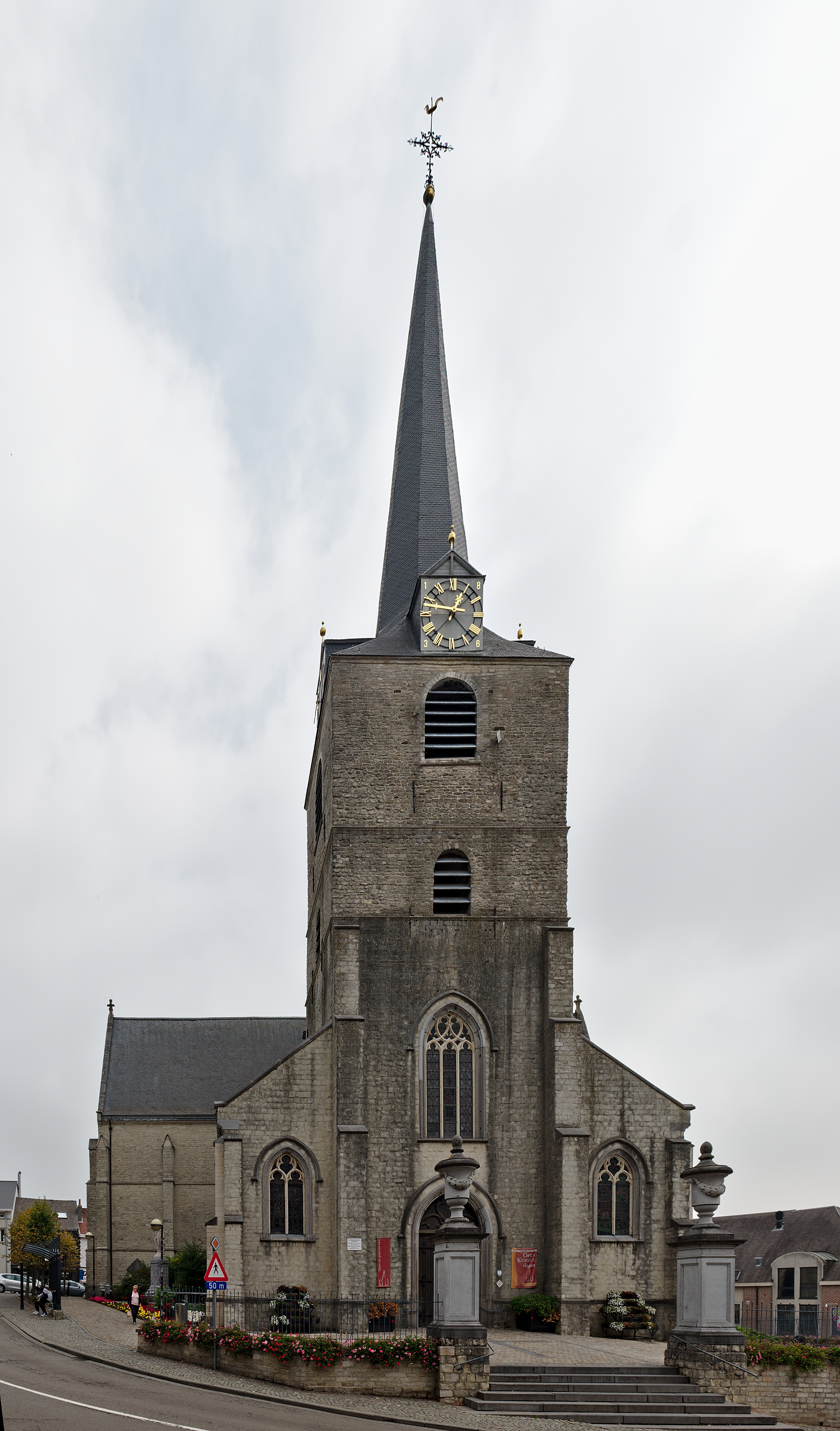
St. Martinus Church

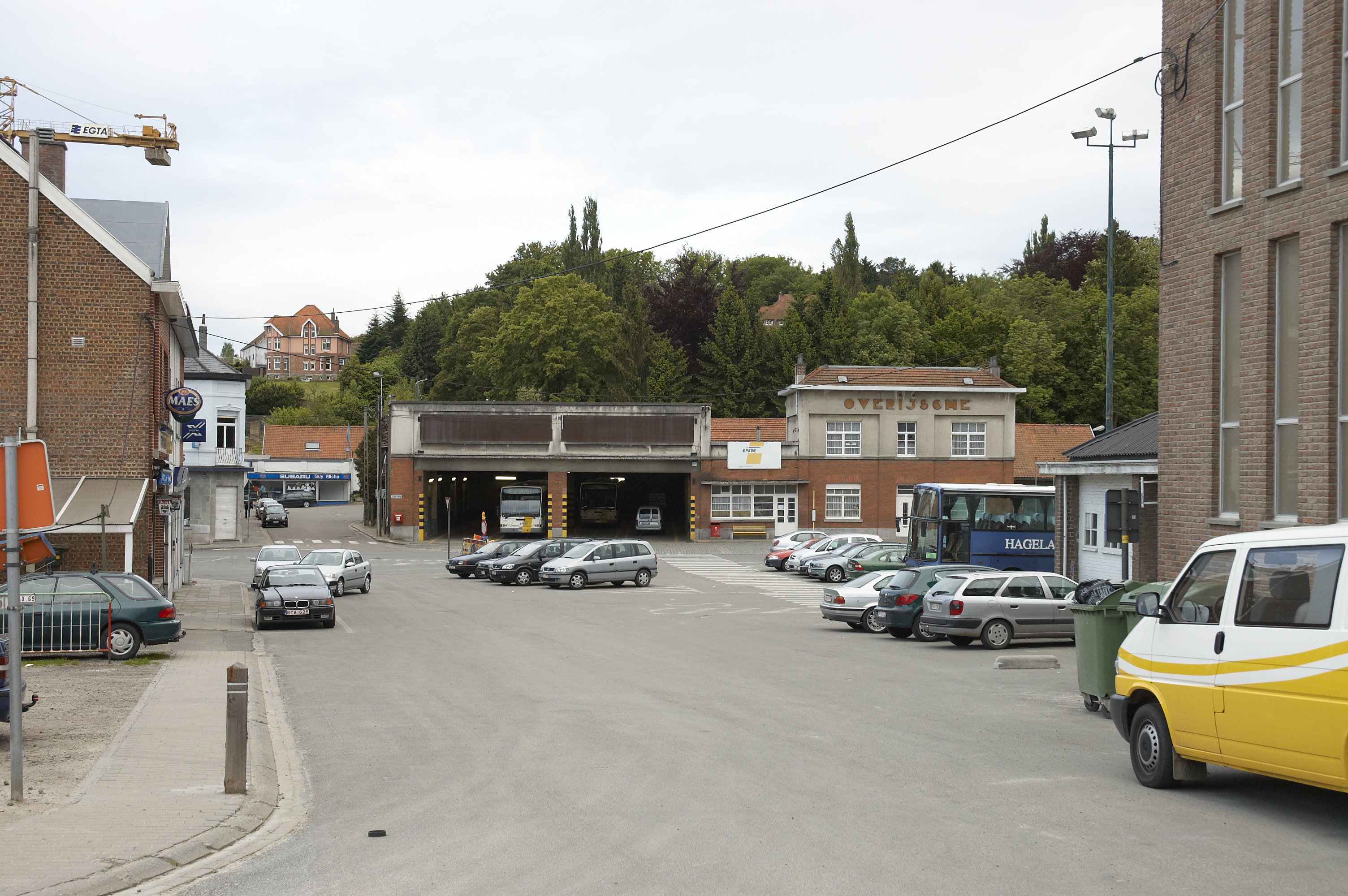
Old central bus station

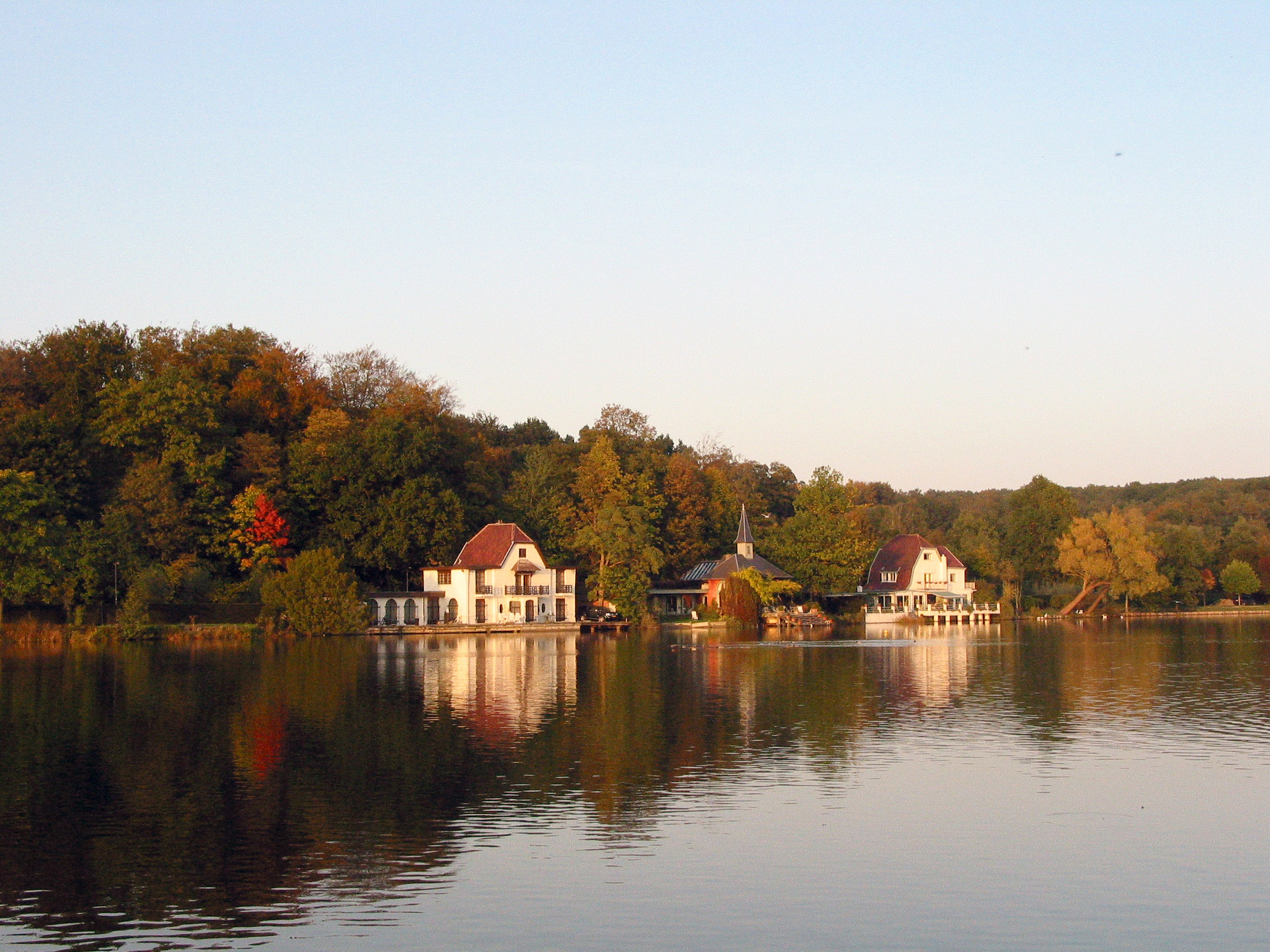
Lake of Overijse-Genval

== Twin towns ==
- Lecco, Lecco, Lombardy, Italy
- Bruttig-Fankel, Rhineland-Palatinate, Germany
- Bacharach, Rhineland-Palatinate, Germany
- Mâcon, Saône-et-Loire, Bourgogne-Franche-Comté, France
- Modra, Slovakia
