= Cornelis de Bryer =

Flemish painter (fl. 1650s)

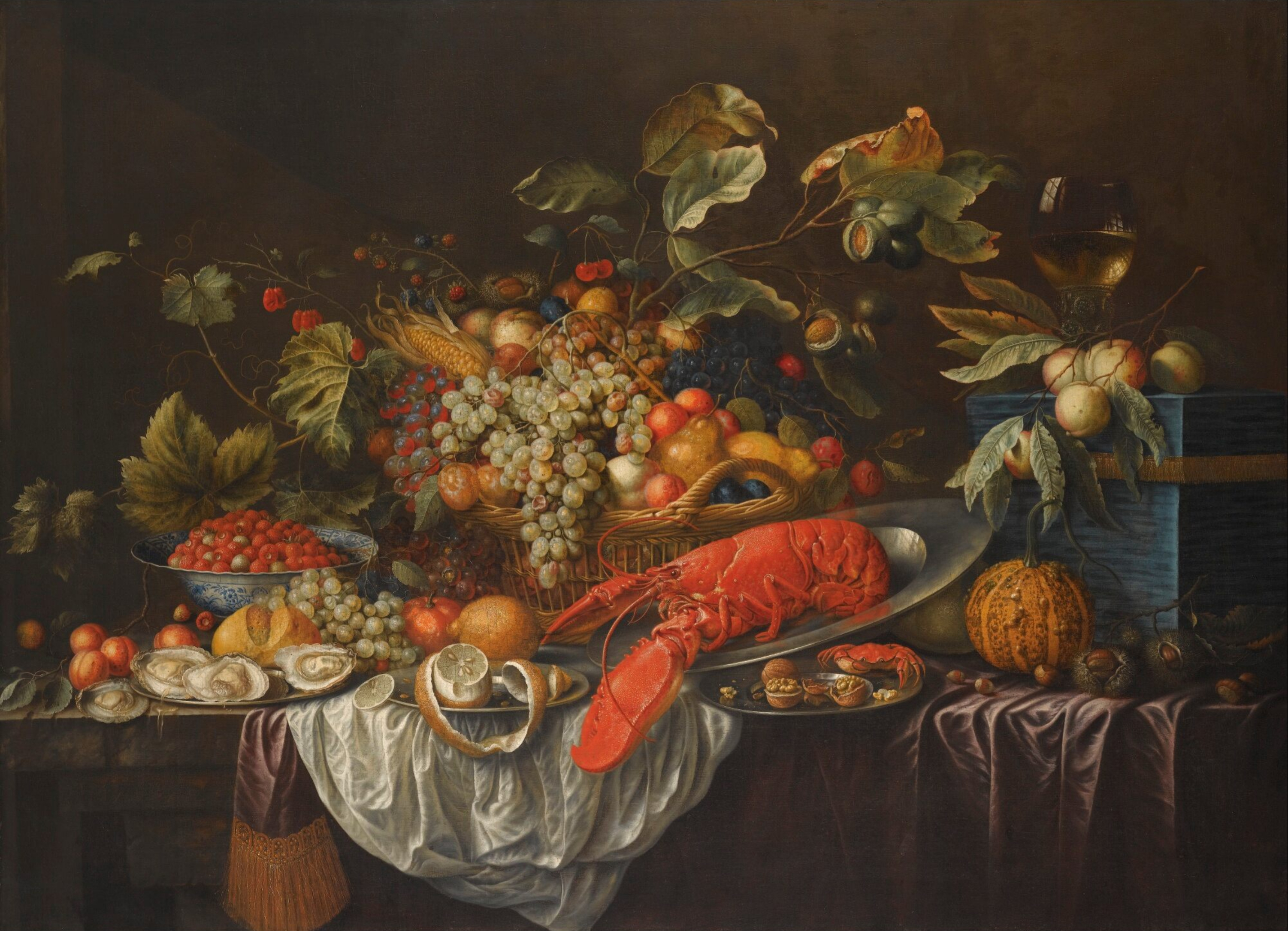
A still life of assorted fruits in a basket

Cornelis de Bryer (fl. 1651–1658) was a Flemish still life painter who was active in Antwerp in the 1650s. He is known for his fruit still lifes, vanitas still lifes and pronkstillevens.

== Life ==
Virtually nothing is recorded about de Bryer's life. His date and place of birth are unknown. He is first recorded at the Guild of Saint Luke of Antwerp as a pupil of Daniel van Middeler in the guild year 1634/1635. There is no record of the artist having been registered as a master of the local Guild.

He is believed to have been active in Antwerp during the 1650s, period from which signed works by his hand have been preserved. He was one of a number of artists in Frankfurt am Main who complained about competition by Johann Heinrich Roos. He was still in Frankfurt on 2 July 1671, when he became the godfather of Cornelis Collet. He was possibly the father of Fabianus de Bryer who became a master of the Antwerp Guild of Saint Luke in 1688 as a master's son.

The date and place of his death are unknown.

== Work ==
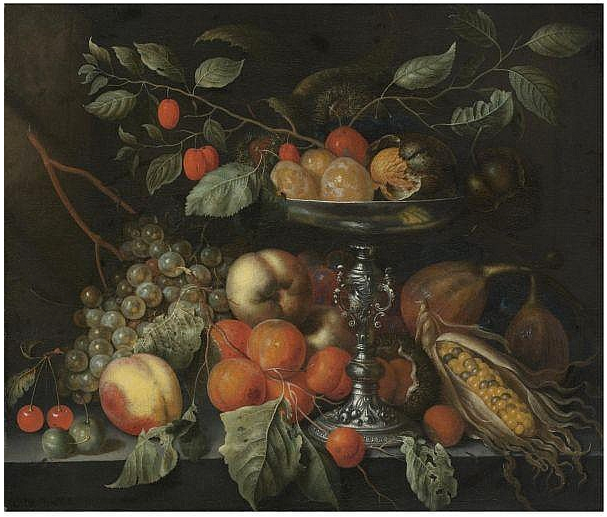
Cherries, grapes, apricots, figs, maize, and other fruit with a silver tazza on a table

De Bryer painted fruit still lifes, vanitas still lifes and pronkstillevens, i.e. sumptuous still lifes of luxurious objects. His dated works are 10 still lifes, which bear dates between 1651 and 1658. He signed Bryer or Brier.

De Bryer is regarded as a member of the circle of painters who were influenced by Jan Davidsz de Heem, a Dutch still life painter who was active in Antwerp at the same time as de Bryer and was himself influenced by Flemish still life painters such as Frans Snyders, Adriaen van Utrecht and Daniel Seghers. De Bryer's style clearly shows the influence of the school of Jan Davidsz. de Heem. This is borne out by one of his works, a signed Still life of grapes, roemer and bread in the Bonnefantenmuseum, Maastricht, which demonstrates his familiarity with the work of Jan Davidsz. and his son Cornelis de Heem, who both worked for long periods of time in Antwerp. De Bryer shared with de Heem an interest in rendering metallic reflections in metallic objects. He showed a high level of technical accomplishment in his rendering of materials.

Another work, formerly in the collection of the Dukes of Beaufort, is more reminiscent of the work of the contemporary Antwerp still life artist Joris van Son.
