= Maria Tassaert =

Flemish painter

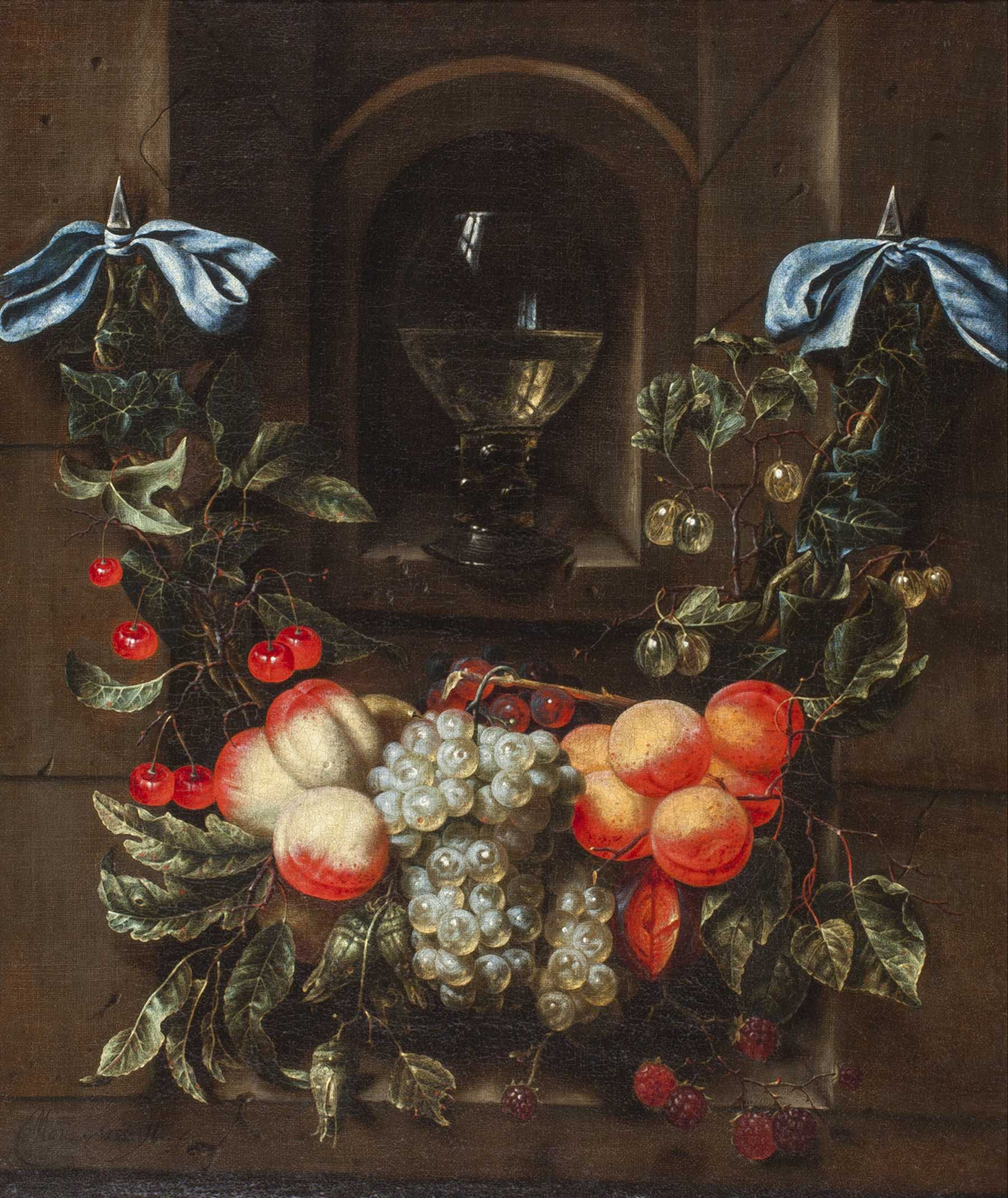
Still Life with a Garland of Fruit suspended from blue Ribbons and a Goblet in a Niche

Maria Tassaert (fl Antwerp, 26 October 1642 – after 1665) was a Flemish still life painter active in Antwerp. She had a short career during which she painted garland paintings, a type of still life painting comprising a garland of flowers around a devotional or other image. She was a member of the Tassaert family of artists, which was active in the Habsburg Netherlands, France, Prussia and England in the 17th and 18th centuries.

== Life ==
Details about the life of Maria Tassaert are scarce. She was born in Antwerp where she was baptized on 26 October 1642. Her parents were Pieter (Peeter) Tassaert the elder and Anna (Joanna) Floquet. Her father was a landscape painter and art dealer who was registered as a master at the Antwerp Guild of Saint Luke in the Guild year 1634–35. Her mother was the daughter of the Antwerp painter Lucas Floquet the elder. Maria's aunt Catharina Floquet was married to the flower painter Frans Ykens.

Maria had many siblings: Lucas (born in 1635), Elisabeth (born in 1640, later married the painter Willem Siberechts), Peeter (born in 1644), Catharina (born in 1649, later married the painter Jan Baptist van der Meiren) and Jan Peter (1651–1725). Her brothers became part-time painters, gilders and art dealers.

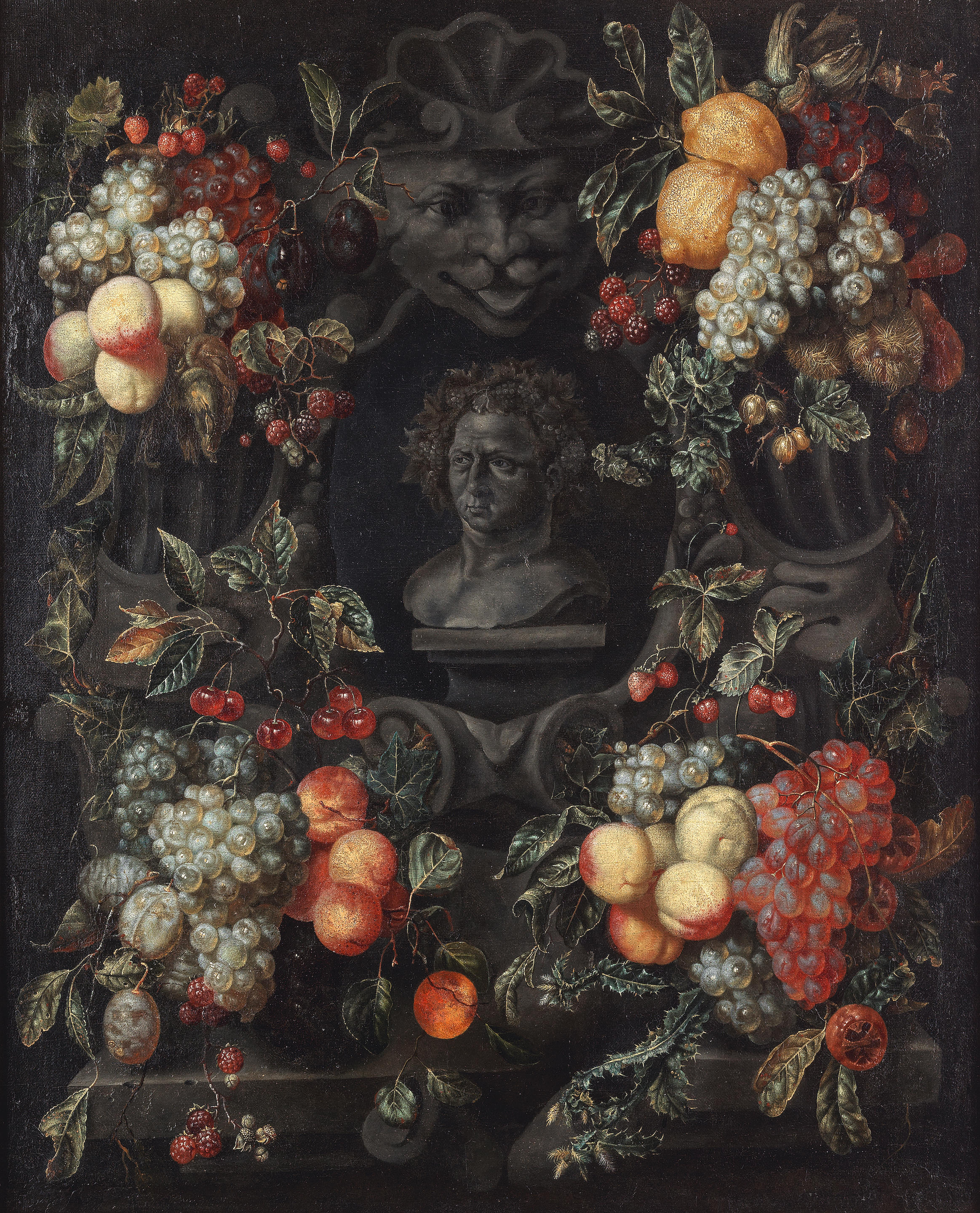
Garland of fruit surrounding a bust of Bacchus in a stone niche

She is believed to have studied painting in the workshop of her father. She is not known to have registered in the local Guild of Saint Luke. She married Jasper Slootmaecker, a paper merchant, on 14 February 1665 in Antwerp. Her husband died at home on 8 September 1668 leaving behind a son by his first wife and a daughter with Maria. Maria was at the time of his death pregnant with her second child. There is no further information as to when or where she died.

== Work ==
The works of Tassaert are very rare. Only one signed work is known, the Still Life with a Garland of Fruit suspended from blue Ribbons and a Goblet in a Niche, which is signed Maria Tassart fc and was last recorded with art dealer Rafael Valls Limited. An unsigned work referred to as Garland of fruit surrounding a bust of Bacchus in a stone niche was offered at the Bonhams London auction of 8 December 2021, lot 67.

Tassaert's two known compositions are in a sub-genre of painting referred to as 'garland paintings'. Garland paintings combine elements of still life and figure painting. They were first painted in early 17th century Antwerp by Jan Brueghel the Elder and subsequentlyby leading Flemish still life painters, in particular Daniel Seghers. Other artists who practised the genre include Hendrick van Balen, Andries Daniels, and Tassaert's uncle Frans Ykens. Paintings in this genre typically show a flower or, less frequently, fruit garland around a devotional image or portrait. The genre was initially connected to the visual imagery of the Counter-Reformation movement. In the later development of the genre, the devotional image is replaced by other subjects such as portraits, mythological subjects, allegorical scenes and even landscapes.

Garland paintings were usually collaborations between a still life and a figure painter. The still life painter would paint the fruit or flower garland while the figure painter would have painted the figurative element inside the cartouche. Tassaert's collaborators (if any) on her garland paintings have not been identified.
