= Emmanuel Schelstrate =

Emmanuel Schelstrate (1649 – 6 April 1692) was a Catholic theologian and ecclesiastical historian.

== Life ==
Schelstrate was born at Antwerp in 1649. While he was a canon of the cathedral of Antwerp, he was called to Rome by Pope Innocent IX and made an assistant librarian of the Vatican Library.

He died at Rome on 6 April 1692.

== Works ==
Schelstrate was a fine scholar in early ecclesiastical history and became the accredited defender of the papal supremacy. For this reason his writings have often been very severely judged.

His Antiquitas illustrata circa concilia generalia et provincialia (Antwerp, 1678) contains decrees of the popes and various matters of Catholic church history; in it he attacked what he, in accord with the Church in Rome, viewed as the errors of Jean Launoy regarding the primacy of Rome. Schelstrate was only able to issue two volumes of a second edition which he had planned on a large scale (1692 and 1697).

Schelstrate carried on controversies with Arnauld and Louis Maimbourg concerning the authority of the general councils and of the popes; he opposed the 1682 Declaration of the Clergy of France, codifying the principles of Gallicanism. Schelstrate wrote a treatise on the origin of the Anglican Church in a controversy with Edward Stillingfleet, Dean of St Paul's Cathedral, London. He published numerous other works.
