= Paul de Barry =

French Jesuit and writer (1587–1661)

- Church: Catholic Church
- Province: Lyon
- Previous posts: Rector of Jesuit colleges at Aix, Nîmes, and Avignon; Provincial of Lyon

Personal details
- Born: 1587 Leucate, France
- Died: 28 July 1661 (aged 73–74) Avignon
- Denomination: Catholicism
- Profession: Jesuit

Paul de Barry (born at Leucate in 1587; died at Avignon, 28 July 1661) was a French Jesuit and writer. He was rector of the Jesuit colleges at Aix, Nîmes, and Avignon, and Provincial of Lyon.

== Works ==
He composed a number of devotional works on the Blessed Virgin, Saint Joseph, and the saints, and a Pensez-y-bien, which latter had a large circulation and has been translated into several languages. Translated into English are Pious Remarks upon the Life of St. Joseph, published in 1600; the Glories of St. Joseph (Dublin, 1835), and Devotions to St. Joseph, edited by the Rev. G. Tickell, S.J. (London, 187– [sic]).
