= Philippe François de Croy, Duke of Havré =

Philippe François de Croy, Vicomte de Langle, Seigneur de Tourcoing (1609–1650), was by marriage Duke of Havré. He was Governor of Luxembourg, and became a Knight of the Order of the Golden Fleece in 1646.

De Croy was first married to Marie Madeleine de Bailleul.

He remarried in 1643 his distant niece and brother's widow, Marie Claire de Croÿ (1605–1664), who was the first Duchess of Croy-Havré. The couple had one son, Ferdinand Francois Joseph de Croÿ-Solre (1644–1694), who became an Imperial Fieldmarshal, Knight in the Order of the Golden Fleece, and who succeeded to the ducal title.
