= Jezus-Eik =

Coordinates: 50°48′N 4°28′E

Jezus-Eik (in French: Notre-Dame-au-Bois, English translation: Jesus-Oak) is a village in the municipality of Overijse in the province of Flemish Brabant, Belgium.

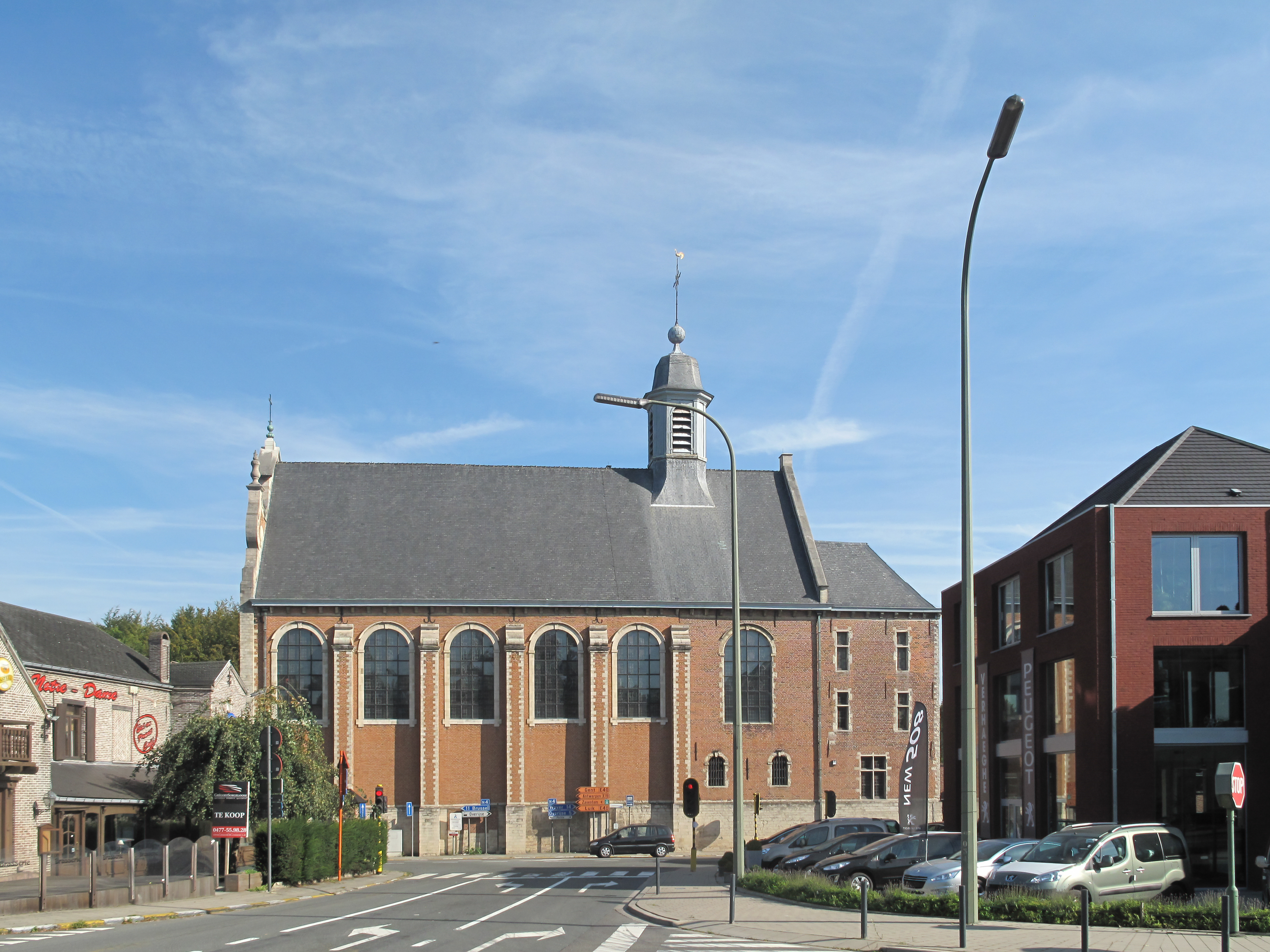
Onze-Lieve-Vrouwkerk

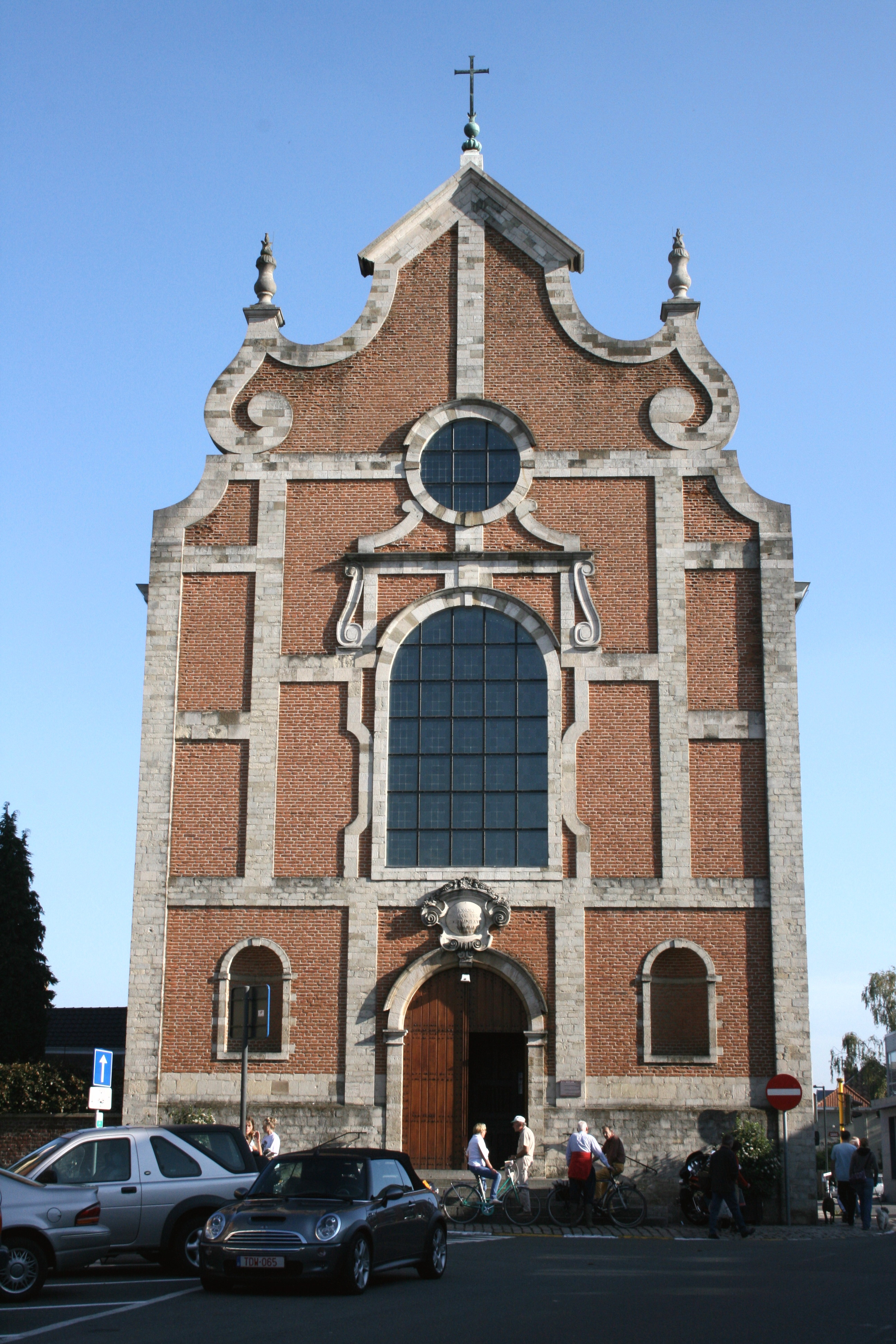
Onze-Lieve-Vrouwkerk
