= Nicolaes Breyghel =

Printer and bookseller in Bruges, Habsburg Netherlands (died 1669)

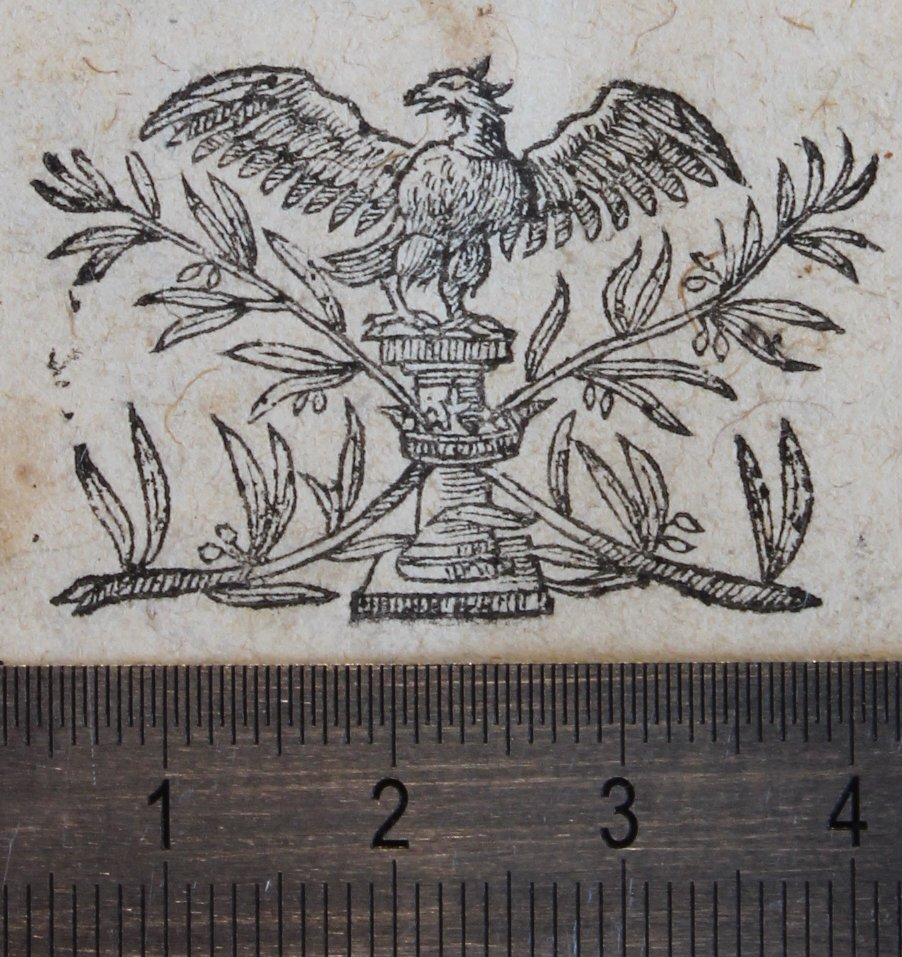
Printer's device of Nicolaes Breyghel as used in Olivier de Wree, Menghel-dichten: Fyghe-snoeper; Bacchvs-Cortryck (1625), copy from Bruges Public Library 634a (f. A1 recto).

Nicolaes Breyghel (died 1669), Latinized Nicolaus Breyghelius, was a leading printer and bookseller in 17th-century Bruges in the Habsburg Netherlands. He was the first publisher of a weekly newspaper in the city.

== Career ==
Breyghel, originally from Cologne, trained as a printer in Antwerp in the early 17th century, becoming a freeman of the city and a master of the Guild of Saint Luke in 1624. In 1625 he set up shop in Bruges, his relocation expenses reimbursed by the city council. Much of his work was printing official publications for the city, but by 1637 he was also publishing the city's first newspaper, Nieuwe Tydinghen uyt verscheyde ghewesten. This was printed weekly, usually on Tuesdays. Between 1640 and 1658 he repeatedly held office in the booksellers' guild. He died on 17 April 1669.

== Publications ==
=== Books ===
- 1625: Olivier de Wree, De vermaerde oorlogh-stucken vanden wonderdadighen velt-heer Carel de Longueval.
- 1627: Maximiliaan de Vriendt, Epigrammatum Libri IX.
- 1628: Anselmus de Boodt, De baene des hemels ende der deughden
- 1630: Pierre Marchant, Sanctificatio S. Josephi sponsi Virginis, nutritii Jesu, in utero asserta.
- 1631:
  - Loop-plaetsen, in tijde van alarme ofte van brande by daghe ofte by nachte.
  - Henricus Vanden Zype, Examen quaestionis, an magis expediat devotam in mundo quam religiosam in monasterio vitam agere.
- 1632:
  - Advertissement, trauwe waerschuwinghe ende instructie (civic regulations during an epidemic).
  - Remedien tegen de peste.
- 1634: Franciscus Piroulle, Oratio funebris in obitum augustae et felicis memoriae Isabellae Clarae Eugeniae Hispaniarum infantis, Belgarum principis, habita Brugis in aede D. Donatani XI. Januarii MDCXXXIV.
- 1638: Pierre Marchant, Baculus pastoralis sive potestas episcoporum in regulares exemptos ab originibus suis explicata.
- 1641: Jan van Blitterswyck, Schat van ghebeden tot O.L. Vrouwe, voor en na de biechte.
- 1642: D. Nicolaus Myrensium episcopus (a play performed by the students of the Jesuit college in Bruges on 27, 28 and 29 January 1642).
- 1655: Charles de Visch, Vita Reverendi in Christo Patris ac Domini, D. Adriani Cancellier, monasterii Dunensis, Ordinis Cisterciensis, quondam Abbatis.
- 1661: t'Samen-spraeck tusschen een Portugees ende een Spanjaert, over het besloten houwelijck van den herstelden koninck van Engelant, met de dochter vanden hertogh van Bragance, diemen koninck van Portugael noemt, ende de dingen die daer uyt staen te volgen.
- 1663:
  - Tractatus historicus primae originis festivitatis sacratissimi corporis et sanguinis Christi
  - Ambrosius door het bestier van edeldom, wijsheyt, ende deught vervoordert tot het bisdom van Milanen (a play performed by the students of the Jesuit college in Bruges on 29, 30 and 31 January 1663).

=== Newspaper ===
- 1637–1658: Nieuwe Tydinghen uyt verscheyde ghewesten.
