= Vincent Stochove =

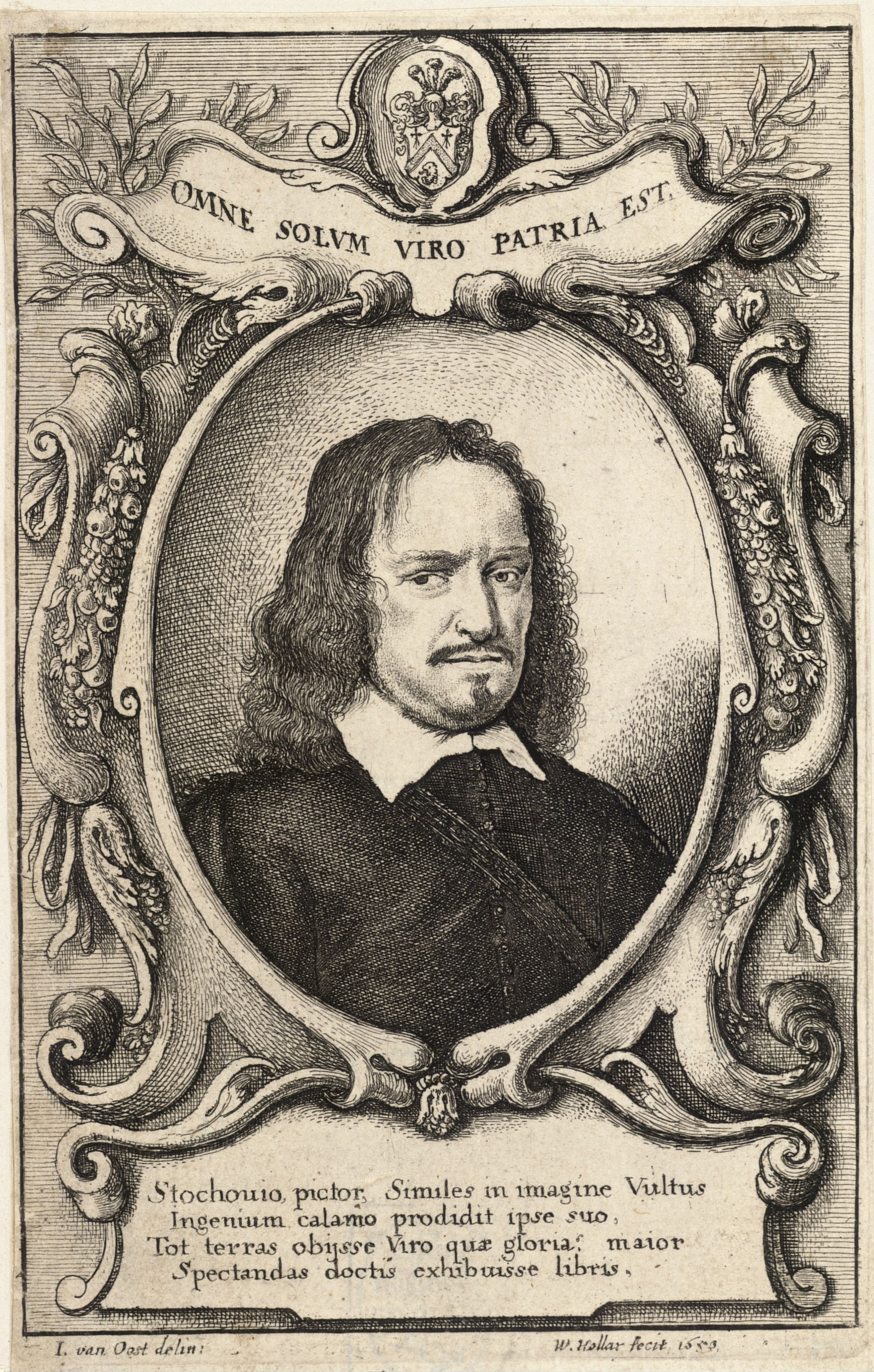
A 1650 engraving of Vincent de Stochove by Wenceslas Hollar

Vincent Stochove or Vincent de Stochove (1610–1679) was a traveller best known for his French-language book Voyage du Levant describing his travels in the 1630s through The Levant, including the Ottoman Empire, including Syria, Palestine, and Egypt.
