= Pierre Marchant =

Father Petrus Marchantius O.F.M.Rec.
- Provincial of the Flemish Province
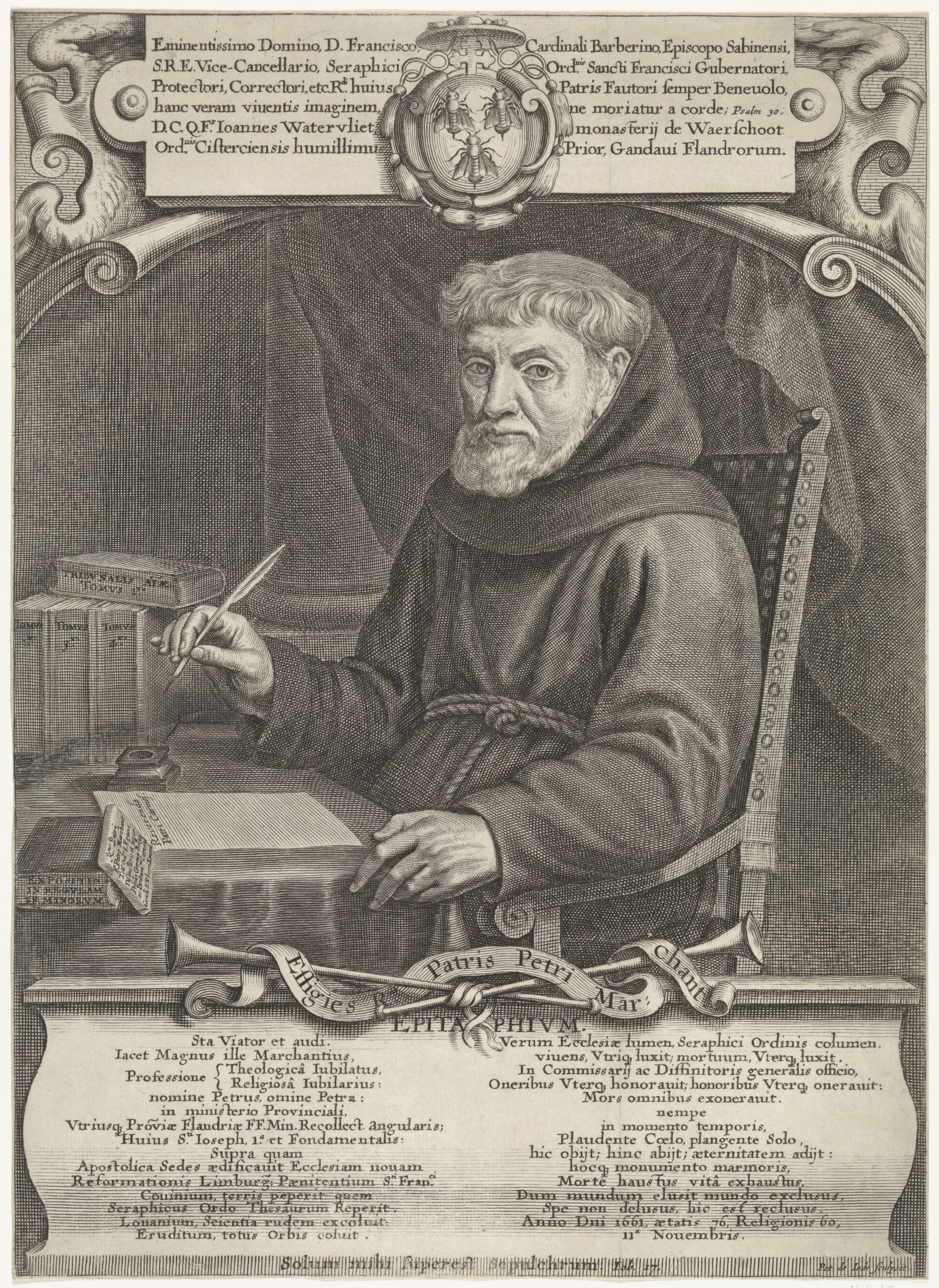
- Portrait of Pierre Marchant engraved by Pieter de Jode II
- Church: Roman Catholic

Personal details
- Born: Pierre Marchant; 1585 Couvin, Prince-Bishopric of Liège, Holy Roman Empire
- Died: 11 November 1661 (aged 75–76) Ghent, County of Flanders, Spanish Netherlands
- Education: Leuven University

Pierre Marchant or Petrus Marchantius O.F.M.Rec. (1585–1661) was a spiritual writer and religious reformer in 17th-century Flanders.

== Life ==
Marchant was born at Couvin in what is now Belgium in 1585 and entered the recollect community in that town in 1601, aged 16.

He acquired a profound knowledge of scholastic philosophy and theology, and for several years taught in the schools of his order. In 1618 he was appointed guardian of the Ghent convent and introduced the Recollect reform there. He represented his province at general chapters of the order in Segovia in 1621 and in Rome in 1625. At the latter general chapter he was elected definitor general of the order. In 1633 and again in 1637 he was visitor of the English Recollects, and in 1637 also commissary of the Cologne province of the order. He was twice elected provincial of the Flemish province.

In 1639 Marchant was appointed commissary general over the provinces of Germany, Belgium, the Netherlands, England, Scotland, and Ireland. His duties as commissary general brought him into contact with Irish politics during the times of the Confederation of Kilkenny. He took sides with the Ormondists and gave encouragement to their opposition to the nuncio Giovanni Battista Rinuccini. He was called upon by the authorities of the order to justify his conduct in connection with the Irish question, and in 1661 he addressed to the general chapter then assembled in Rome his apologia under the title of Relatio veridica et sincera status Provinciae Hiberniae. This is a very rare book, never widely circulated and condemned by the general chapter; and ordered to be destroyed.

Marchant was a voluminous author. His major work is Tribunal Sacramentale, which contains a full exposition of moral theology for the use of confessors. He puts aside all disputed opinions, and simply states the doctrinal teaching of the Catholic Church, drawing his proofs from Holy Scripture, the decisions of councils, the constant tradition of the Church, and the writings of the saints. The treatise on probabilism is lucid and complete. Its principles are within the restrictions placed on the doctrine later on by the decrees of Alexander VII and Innocent XI; and in many points match the doctrine subsequently propounded by Daniel writing against the Lettres Provinciales.

Marchant wrote several works on the veneration of Saint Joseph. His Sanctificatio S. Joseph Sponsi Virginis in utero asserta (Bruges, [1630]), was placed on the Index, 19 March 1633.

His brother Jacques, a secular priest, was the author of the Hortus Pastorum.

Marchant died in Ghent on 11 November 1661.

== Works ==
- Sanctificatio S. Josephi sponsi Virginis, nutritii Jesu, in utero asserta (Bruges, Nicolaes Breyghel, 1630).
- Expositio litteralis in Regulam S. Francisci (Antwerp, Willem Lesteens, 1631).
- Constitutions des religieuses réformées pénitentes du Tierce Ordre de S. François, de la Congrégation de Limbourg (Ghent, Jan Vanden Kerchove, 1635).
- Baculus pastoralis sive potestas episcoporum in regulares exemptos ab originibus suis explicata (Bruges, Nicolaes Breyghel, 1638).
- L'Image du vray chrestien sur le poutrait de la règle du Tiers Ordre de N.B.P.S. François (Ghent, Alexander Sersanders, 1638). Available on Google Books.
- Lucerna fidei per fratres minores sancti Francisci (Ghent, Alexander Sersanders, 1639).
- Afbeeldinghe des waerachtigh christen mensch naer het voorbeelt vanden reghel der derder order van den godt-salighen vader s. Franchois (Ghent, 1639).
- Tribunal sacramentale et visibile animarum in hac vita mortali (2 vols., Ghent, Bartholomeus Pauwels, 1642–1643).
- Chronicon sive commissariorum nationalium nationis germanico-belgicae ordinis S. Francisci origo, institutio, potestas et auctoritas (Ghent, Jan Vanden Kerchove, 1651).
- Expositio mystico-litteralis SSmi. Incruenti sacrificii missae (Ghent, Alexander Sersanders 1653).
- Notabiles resolutiones variorum casuum et quaestionum practicarum a multis hactenus desideratae (Antwerp, Petrus Bellerus, 1655)
- Fundamenta duodecim ordinis Fratrum minorum S. Francisci Fundamentis duodecim apostolorum civitatis S. Jerusalem (Antwerp, Petrus Bellerus, 1657).
- Académie, ou exercitations spirituelles sur les trois dévotions principales practiquées en terre par la B.V. Marie, mère de Dieu (Ghent, widow of J. Vanden Kerchove, 1658).
- Excellences sur-éminentes de la grande et sacrée indulgence octroyé par Notre-Seigneur Jésu Christ à l’église de Notre-Dame des Anges, dite Portioncula (Ghent, widow of J. Vanden Kerchove, 1660).
