= Jean de Chokier de Surlet =

Canon lawyer and political writer in Liège (1571-1656)

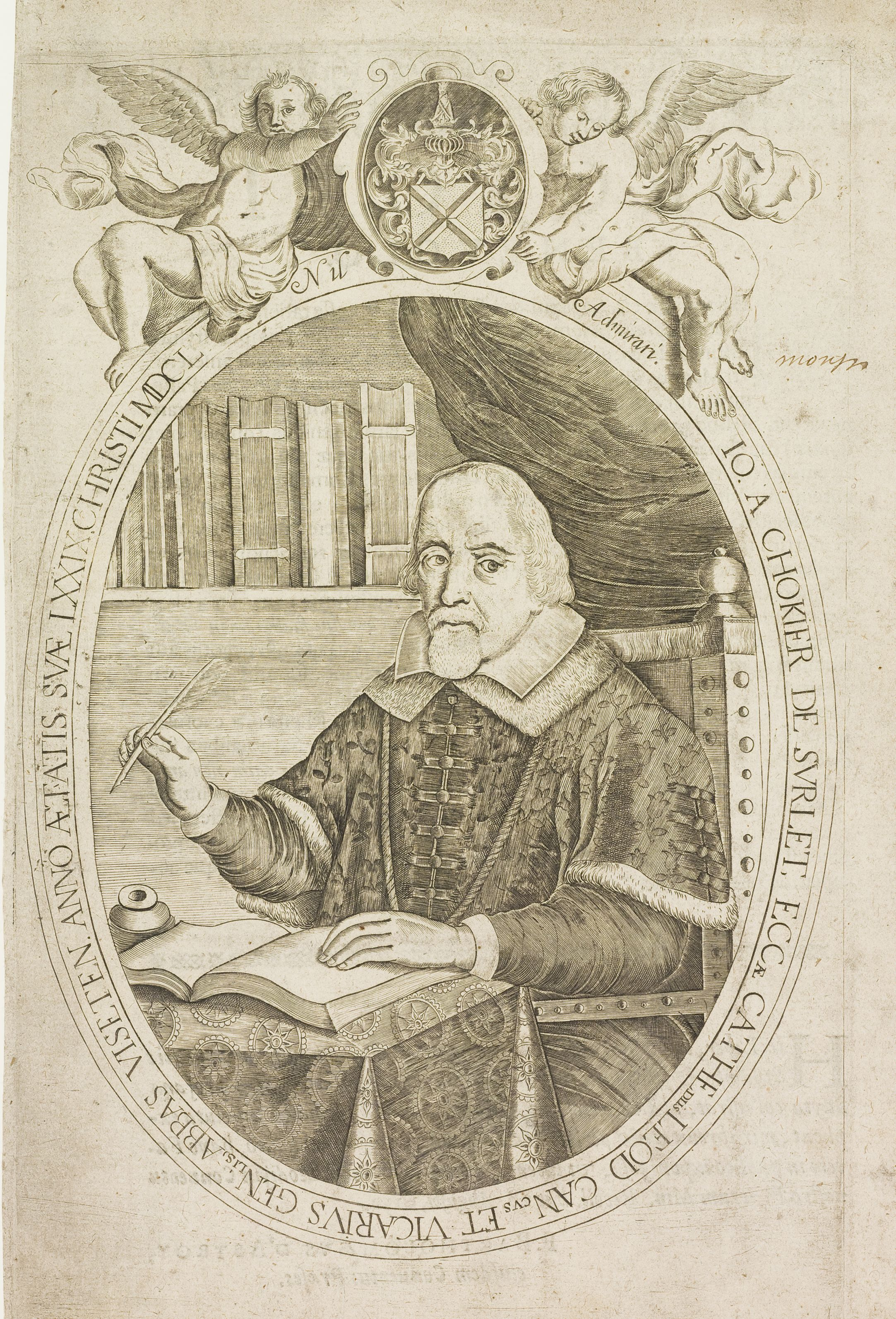
Jeand de Chokier de Surlet

Jean de Chokier, Baron de Surlet (1571-1656) was a canon lawyer and political writer in the Prince-Bishopric of Liège. He is considered as "perhaps [Justus] Lipsius's most important disciple".

== Life ==
Jean de Chokier de Surlet was born to a noble family at Liège on 14 January 1571. He was elected member of the powerful college of canons at the Cathedral of Our Lady and St. Lambert in Liège and went on to become general vicar for spiritual affairs under prince-bishop Ferdinand of Bavaria.

He was taught by Justus Lipsius, who encouraged the influence of Tacitus and the use of sententiae and exempla to drive home political points. Each chapter in Chokier de Surlet's 1610 Thesaurus Aphorismorum Politicorum (Treasury of Political Aphorisms) contained a section quoting extensively from ancient authorities, and another section with examples to prove the point.

== Works ==
- (ed.) Onosandri Strategicvs, siue De Imperatoris Institvtione: Additae In Extremo Operis Variantes Lectiones ex Codd. diuersorum M. SS. depromptae, 1610
- Thesaurus Politicorum Aphorismorum: In Quo Principum, Consiliariorum, Aulicorum Institio proprie continetur; Una cum Exemplis Omnis Aevi ..., 1610
- Tractatus de re nummaria prisco ævi: quae collata ad æstimationem monetæ præsentis: ad Historia cùm profane, tùm sacræ intelligentiam non parum utilis, 1619
- Commentaria in regvlas Cancellariae Apostolicae: sive in Glossemata Alphonsi Sotto, glossatoris nuncupati, 1621
- Scholia In Primarias Preces Imperatoris, 1621
- Tractatvs de legato, 1624
- Vindiciae Libertatis Ecclesiasticae: Divisae In Dvas Partes: In quarum prima ostenditur Appellationes ab Ecclesiasticis Iudicibus in causis ciuilibus inter Laicos motis, in Imperiali Camera non esse interponendas, nec ab ea recipiendas. Altera scribitur Contra impios Ecclesiae Mastyges, illius bona, ac iura vsurpantes, 1630
- Facis historiarum centuriae duae: quarum prima continet mores diversarum gentium, altera ritus sacros ..., 1650
