= Nieuwe Tydinghen uyt verscheyde ghewesten =

- Type: Weekly newspaper
- Format: single sheet
- Publisher: Nicolaes Breyghel
- Founded: in or before 1637
- Ceased publication: in or after 1654
- Language: Dutch
- Headquarters: Bruges

Nieuwe Tydinghen uyt verscheyde ghewesten ("News from various regions") was a weekly newspaper published in Bruges by Nicolaes Breyghel from 1637 or earlier. The last known issue was printed in 1654. Publication seems to have ended by 1660.

The newspaper was printed in two columns on both sides of a single sheet, typically with news about trade, war, and dynastic events in foreign lands.

Most surviving issues, 83 from the years 1637–1645, are bound into a single volume in Bruges Public Library.
