= Joannes Sturmius Mechlinianus =

Belgian mathematician, physician and poet (1559–1650)

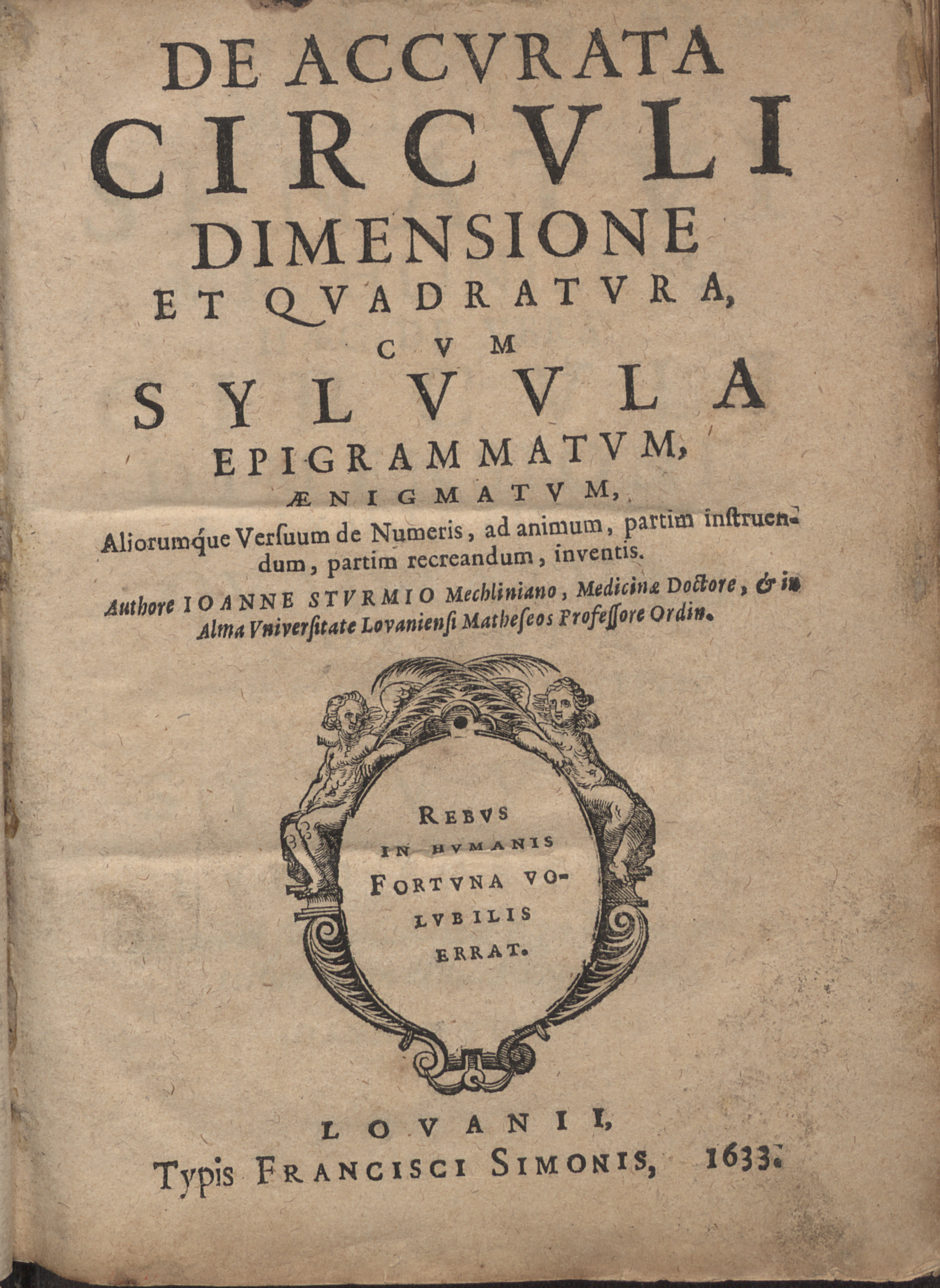
De accurata circuli dimensione et quadratura, 1633

Johannes Storms of Mechelen, also known as Joannes Sturmius Mechlinianus, or simply Sturmius or Mechlinianus (1559–1650) was a mathematician, physician and poet from the Spanish Netherlands.

== Life ==
Sturmius was born in Mechelen on 29 August 1559. He studied at Leuven University, graduating Master of Arts before the age of 20, and on 12 June 1579 he was appointed to a benefice of the chaplaincy of St Margaret in Mechelen. In 1585 he was appointed to teach dialectics and metaphysics in Lily College, Leuven, while pursuing further studies in the Faculty of Medicine. In 1591 he graduated licentiate in medicine and was appointed to the university's academic council. He audited the lectures of Adriaan van Roomen. In 1593 Sturmius was appointed to the chair in mathematics vacated by Roomen, graduating doctor of medicine the same year.

In 1603 he was appointed regent of Lily College, resigning in 1606 to marry Catherine van Thienen. After her death in 1619, Sturmius took holy orders.

He died in Leuven on 9 March 1650, and was buried in the church of St Kwinten.

Thomas Fienus (1567–1631) was one of his students.

== Works ==
- De Rosa Hierichuntina. Leuven, Gerard Rivius, 1607
- De Insulis in civitate Lovaniensi existentibus
- Physica, seu generalia philosophiae naturalis theoremata e libris Aristotelis desumpta. Leuven, Gerard Rivius, 1610
- De cometa anni MDCXVIII. Cologne, 1619.
- De accurata circuli dimensione et quadratura. Leuven, Fr. Simonis, 1633
- Psalterium Β. Mariae Virginis et meditationes piet versibus trochaïchis dimetris illigatae. Leuven, Fr. Simonis, 1633
- Fasciculus versuum, tam numeralium. Leuven, Fr. Simonis, 1635
- Prognostica pro annis 1631, 1635, 1636, per versus chronicus de singulis mensibus cum quibusdam epigrammatibus. Leuven, Fr. Simonis, 1636
- Ad sanctissimae Trinitatis gloriam, versus elegiaci. Leuven, Justus Coppenius, 1639
