= Martin Binnart =

Martin Binnart (active 1627–1653) was a German-born bookseller and lexicographer in 17th-century Antwerp, and the publisher of the twin newspapers Le Postillon ordinaire (in French) and Den Ordinarissen Postilioen (in Dutch), both titles meaning "The regular post-rider".

== Life ==
A native of Eisenach in Germany, Binnart was living in Antwerp by 1627. He seems to have worked as a proofreader at the Plantin Press before setting up in business for himself as a bookseller in 1634. In 1634-1635 he registered as a member of the Guild of St Luke. His earliest known address was by de Borse ("by the Exchange"), 1627–1630, later De Bonte Koey ("the brindled cow") in the Hoogstraat, and from 1647 Den gulden Arent ("the golden eagle") in the Kammenstraat.

Binnart had two children, Jeanne (baptised 7 August 1627) and Martin (baptised 27 January 1630). Jeanne's godfather was Hieronymus Verdussen, whose brother would publish the newspaper Extraordinarisse Post-Tijdinghen, while Martin's godmother was Suzanna Spierinckx, wife of Abraham Verhoeven, who published the newspaper Nieuwe Tijdinghen, showing close social connections between the publishers of Antwerp's earliest three newspapers. Binnart became a citizen of Antwerp on 21 June 1641.

Binnart received a licence to print his own newspaper, Den Ordinarissen Postilioen, on 22 November 1635, and published it twice weekly (issues survive 1637–1646). In parallel he also published a weekly French version of the newspaper as Le Postillon ordinaire (issues survive 1639–1644). The newspaper was continued by his widow and heirs after his death, with licence renewals in 1658 and 1668. Binnart's widow died in 1672-1673.

Binnart also compiled a Dutch–Latin dictionary with the title Dictionarium Teutonico-Latinum. The earliest copy only partially survives and the date of publication is unclear. The oldest full copy to survive was printed by Hieronymus Verdussen in 1635. An expanded edition was printed in Antwerp in 1649 with the title Biglotton sive Dictionarium Teuto-Latinum novum. This was reprinted in Amsterdam in 1652, and in the century after Binnart's death it went through numerous reprintings in Antwerp, Amsterdam and Utrecht.

== Publications ==
- Biglotton sive Dictionarium Teuto-Latinum novum.

=== As publisher ===
1637

- Verhael van het bloedigh bancquet vanden graef Warfusee.

1638

- Den victorieusen lauwer-crans van sijne coninghl. hoogheijdt Ferdinandus infant van Spaignien, verkreghen door de groote victorien in Vlaenderen, ende 't landt van Waes.
- Den seghe-rijcken triomph-boghe, oft Beschrijvinghe vande victorien vercregen tegen de Hollanders in't landt van Waes ende teghen de Fransoysen voor S. Omer.
- Tydinghe van het gheluckigh ontset der stadt Geldre ende vlucht des prince van Orangien ende sijnen legher.

1646

- Guilielmus Marquis, Van d’ophoudinghe der urine, met de curatie ende preservatie derselve: ende sommighe remedien tegen het graveel.

1647

- Langh-ghewenschden peys tusschen sijne catholijcke majesteyt van Spaignien ende de vereenighde heeren Staten van Hollandt, &c. Ghesloten ende gheteeckent tot Munster op den 8. ianuarius, 1647.
- Confirmation de la desiree paix avec les noms des seigneurs ambassadeurs, qui ont este envoye a Munster.
- Confirmation und Bekräfftigung deß so lang erwünschten Friedens mit der Cron Spanien und den Herren Staden.
- François Clouet, Protestatie ende uytersten wille van Francois Clouet in d'ordre van de capucinen ghenaemt pater Basile van Roaen.

1648

- De blyde incomste van syne doorluchtighste hoogheyt den aertsch-hertogh Leopoldus Wilhelmus in de stadt van Antwerpen.
- Publicatie van den vrede tusschen den catholiicken coningh van Spaignien ende de heeren Staten Generael der Vereenighde Provincien gheschiedt tot Munster op den 16. dagh van mey, anno 1648.
- Veroveringhe vande citadelle ende casteel tot Cortryck. Gheschiedt op den 24. mey 1648.
- De ghefailleerden aenslagh van de Fransoisen op Oosteynde, gheschiedt tusschen den 14. ende 15. dagh van iunius, 1648.

1649

- L'execution et la mort du roy d'Angleterre faite publiquement le 9. febr. 1649 à Londres en Angleterre, avec ce que le roy a dit sur l'eschaffaut.
