= Olivier de Wree =

Flemish writer and politician (1596–1652)

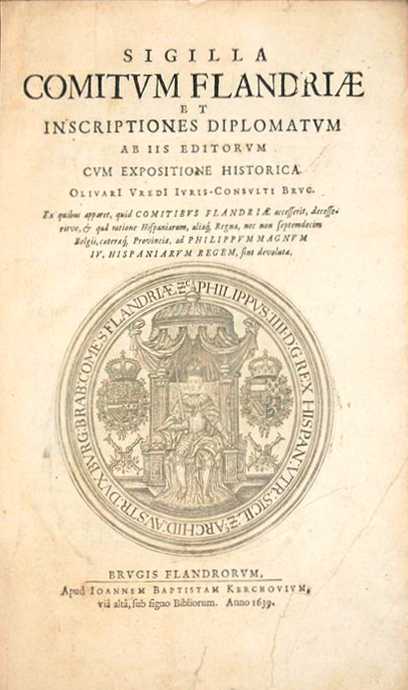
Frontispiece of De Wree's study of the seals of the Counts of Flanders

Olivier de Wree (1596–1652), pen name Latinized as Olivarius Vredius, was a Neo-Latin poet and historian from the Spanish Netherlands.

== Life ==
Born in Bruges on 28 September 1596, De Wree was educated at Jesuit schools there and at Douai. After trying his vocation in the Jesuit novitiate, he studied at the University of Douai, graduating Licentiate of Laws. He went on to become a member of the city council of Bruges, serving as alderman, treasurer and mayor. At the expiry of the Twelve Years' Truce in 1621 he was instrumental in putting the city into a state of preparedness to prevent Dutch incursions into the County of Flanders.

He induced the printer Jan Baptist van den Kerchove to relocate from Ghent to Bruges. Kerchove, whose father Jan had printed De Wree's early poems, was granted the freedom of the city and registered with the guild of booksellers in 1639.

De Wree died in Bruges on 21 March 1652.

== Works ==
- Den oorspronck, ende voort-ganck der Carmeliten ofte onse L. Vrovwe-broeders, ende des H. Scapuliers (Ghent, Jan van den Kerchove, 1624).
- Venus-ban (Bruges, Nicolaes Breyghel, 1625).
- De vermaerde oorlogh-stucken vanden wonderdadighen velt-heer Carel de Longueval (Bruges, Nicolaes Breyghel, 1625).
- Sigilla comitum Flandriae (Bruges, Jan Baptist van den Kerchove, 1639).
- Historiae Flandriae christianae (1640)
- Genealogia Comitum Flandriae (2 vols, Bruges, Jan Baptist van den Kerchove, 1642–1643).
