= Melchior =

Melchior is the name traditionally given to one of the biblical Magi appearing in the Gospel of Matthew. Notable people with the name include:

== As a first name ==
- Melchior Acontius (1515–1569), German poet
- Melchior Adam (1575–1622), German literary historian
- Melchior Adam Weikard (1742–1803), German physician
- Melchior Anderegg (1828–1914), Swiss mountain guide
- Melchora Aquino (1812–1919), Filipino revolutionary
- Melchior de Escuda Aybar (1631–1679), Spanish Roman Catholic prelate
- Melchior Barthel (1625–1672), German sculptor
- Melchior S. Beltzhoover (1868–1918), American businessman
- Melchior Berri (1801–1854), Swiss architect
- Melchior Boisserée (1786–1851), German art collector
- Melchior Borchgrevinck (1570–1632), musician, composer
- Melchior de Marion Brésillac (1813–1859), French Roman Catholic missionary and priest
- Melchior Broederlam (c. 1350 – after 1409), Dutch painter
- Melchior of Brunswick-Grubenhagen (1341–1384), German aristocrat
- Melchior Buliński (1810–1877), Polish priest and historian
- Melchior Bürgin (born 1943), Swiss rower
- Melchior Bwakira (1937–2009), Burundian diplomat
- Melchior Cano (1525–1560), Spanish theologian
- Melchior Carneiro (1516–1583), Portuguese bishop
- Melchior Cibinensis, 16th century Hungarian alchemical writer
- Melchior Paul von Deschwanden (1811–1881), Swiss painter
- Melchior Guy Dickens (1696–1775), British diplomat
- Melchior von Diepenbrock (1798–1853), German Catholic Prince-Bishop of Breslau and Cardinal
- Melchior of Doberschütz (fl. late 16th century), Pomeranian town chief and governor of Neustettin
- Melchior Falch (1720–1791), Norwegian jurist and civil servant
- Melchior Feselen (1495–1538), German painter
- Melchior Franck (1579–1639), German composer
- Melchior Schjelderup Olsson Fuhr (1790–1869), Norwegian politician
- Melchior Zobel von Giebelstadt (1505–1558), Bishop of Wurtzburg
- Melchior Goldast (1576–1635), Swiss writer
- Melchior Grodziecki (1584–1619), Catholic saint
- Melchior Grübel (1500–1561), Swiss merchant and conquistador in Venezuela
- Melchior de Gualbes (fl. 15th century), Catalan knight, politician, and poet
- Melchior Hamers (1638–1710), Flemish painter
- Melchior von Hatzfeldt (1593–1658), German professional soldier in the Imperial army
- Melchior Hedloff (1605–1654), 17th century Silesian felon and serial killer
- Melchior Heger (fl. 16th century), German choir director and conductor
- Melchior Heßler (1619–1690), German engineer and master builder
- Melchior Hittorp (1525–1584), German theologian
- Melchior Hoffman (c. 1495–1543), German-Dutch Anabaptist prophet
- Melchior Hoffmann (composer) (c. 1679–1715), German composer
- Melchior d'Hondecoeter (1636–1695), Dutch animalier
- Melchior Inchofer (c. 1584–1648), Jesuit who took part in Galileo's trial
- Melchior Jagmet (fl. 17th–18th century), Swiss politician
- Melchior Klesl (1552–1630), Austrian bishop and statesman
- Melchior Zhang Kexing (1914–1988), Chinese Catholic priest and bishop
- Melchior Küsel (1626–1684), German engraver
- Melchior Lechter (1865–1937), German painter
- Melchior Lengyel (1880–1974), Hungarian writer
- Melchior von Lichtenfels (1517–1575), Prince-Bishop of Basel
- Melchior de Lisle (1908–1977), French entomologist
- Melchior Lorck (1526–1583), Danish-German Renaissance painter
- Melchior Lotter (c. 1470–1549), German typographer and publisher
- Melchior Lussy (1529–1606), Swiss statesman
- Melchior de la Mars, Flemish painter
- Melchior Mataki, Solomon Islands civil servants
- Melchior Mbonimpa (born 1955), Burundian-Canadian writer
- Melchior von Meckau (1440–1509), German cardinal
- Melchior Meyr (1810–1871), German writer and philosopher
- Melchior Ndadaye (1953–1993), Burundian politician and president
- Melchior Nankwahomba, Burundian politician
- Melchior Neumayr (1845–1890), Austrian paleontologist
- Melchior Ntahobama, Burundian politician
- Melchior Nunes Barreto (c. 1520–1571), Jesuit, missionary in Asia
- Melchior von Osse (1506–1556), German theoretician
- Melchior Palyi (1892–1970), Hungarian economist
- Melchior Polowy (1911–1997), American sport wrestler and wrestling coach
- Melchior de Polignac (1661–1742), French diplomat, Roman Catholic cardinal
- Melchior Rahm (1762–1820), American politician
- Melchior Rasp (1715–1785), Austrian stonemason
- Melchior Renner (1770–1821), German missionary
- Melchior Rink (1494–1545), German Anabaptist leader
- Melchior Römer (1831–1895), Swiss politician
- Melchior Russ (1450–1499), Swiss noble
- Melchior Ernst Sachs (1843–1910), German composer
- Melchior Otto Voit von Salzburg (1603–1653), Prince Bishop of Bamberg
- Melchior van Santvoort (c. 1570 – 1641), Dutch sailor who travelled to Japan
- Melchior Schildt (c. 1592–1667), German composer and organist
- Melchior Friedrich von Schönborn-Buchheim (1644–1717), German politician
- Melchior Sebisch the Elder (1539–1625), Silesian physician and entomologist
- Melchior Sebisch the Younger (1578–1674), Silesian physician
- Melchior Shi Hongzhen (born 1927), Chinese Roman Catholic bishop
- Melchior Steiner, American printer
- Melchior Sun De-zhen (1869–1951), Roman Catholic bishop
- Melchior Tavernier (1594–1665), Flemish printmaker (1594-1665)
- Melchior Teschner (1584–1635), German cantor, composer and theologian
- Melchior Thalmann (1924–2013), Swiss gymnast
- Melchior Treub (1851–1910), Dutch botanist
- Melchior de la Vallée, French priest
- Melchior de Vogüé (1848–1910), French diplomat, travel writer, archaeologist, philanthropist
- Melchior Vulpius (c. 1570–1615), German composer
- Melchior Wathelet, Belgian politician
- Melchior Wathelet Jr. (born 1977), Belgian politician
- Melchior Wańkowicz (1892–1974), Polish writer, journalist and publisher
- Melchior Weiher (1574–1643), Polish nobleman
- Melchior Wezel (1903–1989), Swiss gymnast
- Melchior Wieland (1519–1589), Prussian botanist and physician
- Melchior Wyrsch (1732–1798), Swiss painter

== As a middle name ==
- John Melchior Barralet (1747–1815), Irish artist
- Antoine Melchior Gaspard de Bernier de Pierrevert (1753–1782), French Navy officer
- John Melchior Bosco, (1815–1888), Catholic saint and founder of the Salesians
- Joannes Charles Melchior Chatin (1847–1912), French botanist and zoologist
- Marie Melchior Joseph Théodose de Lagrené (1800–1862), French diplomat
- Andreas Melchior Seip Diesen (1881–1958), Norwegian physician
- Johann Melchior Dinglinger (1664–1731), German goldsmith
- Antoni Melchior Fijałkowski (1778–1861), Archbishop of Warsaw
- Johann Melchior Gletle (1626–1683), Organist and composer
- Johann Melchior Goeze (1717–1786), German theologian
- Jacob Melchior van Herck (1691–1735), Flemish painter
- Joachim Melchior von Holten (1671–1708), Governor of the Danish West Indies
- Johann Melchior Kambly (1718–1783), Swiss sculptor
- Joan Melchior Kemper (1776–1824), Dutch jurist and politician
- Georg Melchior Kraus (1737–1806), German painter
- Salutaris Melchior Libena (born 1963), Tanzanian Catholic prelate
- Johann Melchior Molter (1696–1765), German composer and violinist
- Henry Melchior Muhlenberg, (1711–1787), Lutheran minister and missionary
- Johann Melchior Aloys von Orelli, Swiss merchant and textile exporter
- Henry Melchior Muhlenberg Richards, United States Military Officer
- Johann Melchior Roos (1663–1731), German Baroque painter
- Giuseppe Melchiorre Sarto, (1835–1914), Catholic saint, Pope (Pius X)
- Johann Georg Melchior Schmidtner (1625–1705), German painter

== As a family name ==
- Andrew Melchior (born 1972), British-German creative technologist and producer
- Arne Melchior (1924–2016), Danish politician, government minister, son of Marcus
- Bent Melchior (1929–2021), chief rabbi of Denmark, son of Marcus
- Carl Melchior (1871–1933), German lawyer, judge, and banker
- Dan Melchior, British singer, songwriter, and guitarist
- Daniela Melchior, Portuguese actress
- Eberhard Melchior (1912–1956), German mathematician
- Eberhard Melchior (naturalist), active around 1700
- Ernst Melchior (1920–1978), Austrian football player
- Friedrich Melchior, Baron von Grimm (1723–1807), German author
- Hans Melchior (1894–1984), German botanist
- Hans Bøchmann Melchior (1773–1831), Danish naturalist
- Heike Melchior (born 1967), German wheelchair curler and Paralympian
- Georges Melchior (1889–1944), French actor
- Graziella Melchior (born 1960), French politician
- Ib Melchior (1917–2015), American science-fiction filmmaker, son of Lauritz
- Israel B. Melchior (1827–1893), Danish engineer, manufacturer and amateur photographer
- Johann Peter Melchior (1747–1825), German artist
- Karen Melchior (born 1980), Danish lawyer and politician
- Lauritz Melchior, Danish operatic tenor, especially Wagnerian roles
- Marcus Melchior (1897–1969), chief rabbi of Denmark
- Marcus Melchior (footballer) (born 2001), Norwegian footballer
- Michael Melchior (born 1954), Danish-Norwegian rabbi, Israeli politician and son of Bent
- Moritz G. Melchior (1816–1884), Jewish-Danish businessman
- Moses Marcus Melchior (1736–1817), Jewish-Danish merchant
- Moses Melchior (businessman) (1825–1912), Danish merchant and judge, his grandson
- Ricardo Melchior (1947–2026), Spanish politician
- Simone Melchior Cousteau (1919–1990), wife of undersea explorer Jacques-Yves Cousteau
- Thaís Melchior (born 1990), Brazilian actress
- Tracy Melchior (born 1970), American actress
- Walter Melchior (1894–1976), American politician

== See also ==
- Majcher, Polish cognate
- Melchor (name), Spanish cognate
