= Melchior Sebitzius =

Melchior Sebitzius could refer to:

- Melchior Sebisch the Elder (1539 – 1625), physician and professor of medicine at the University of Strasbourg
- Melchior Sebisch the Younger (1578 – 1674), physician and professor of medicine at the University of Strasbourg
