= Melchor =

Melchor may refer to:

- Melchor (name)
- Melchor Island in Chile
- Melchor Ocampo, Nuevo León, a municipality in Mexico
- Melchor Ocampo, State of Mexico, a town and municipality in Mexico
- Villa de Tututepec de Melchor Ocampo, a town and municipality in south-western Mexico
- Melchor de Mencos, a municipality in Guatemala
- Instituto Español Melchor de Jovellanos, a Spanish international school in Morocco
- ARM Melchor Ocampo (G10), the former American Auk-class minesweeper USS Roselle (AM-379); acquired by the Mexican Navy on 1 February 1973; renamed Manuel Gutiérrez Zamora (P109), 1993; in active service.
- ARM Melchor Ocampo (G16), the former American Auk-class minesweeper USS Scoter (AM-381); acquired by the Mexican Navy on 19 September 1972 as Gutiérrez Zamora (C84); later reclassified as G16; later renamed Melchor Ocampo; renamed Felipe Xicoténcatl (P115), 1993; retired from service by 2004
- Melkor, a fictional character in Tolkien's legendarium.

== See also ==
- Melchior (disambiguation)
