= Melchor (name) =

Melchor is a Spanish masculine given name and surname, the Spanish form of Melchior. Notable people with the name include:

Given name

- Melchor Aymerich, Spanish general and colonial administrator
- Melchor Bravo de Saravia (1512–1577), Spanish conquistador, interim viceroy of Peru, and Royal Governor of Chile
- Melchor Cano (1509–1560), Spanish Scholastic theologian
- Melchor Casco de Mendoza (1581–1658), Spanish nobleman
- Melchor Chavez (born 1951) Filipino politician
- Melchor Cob Castro (born 1968), Mexican boxer
- Melchor Concha y Toro (1833–1892), Chilean businessman, lawyer, and politician
- Melchor de Aguilera, 17th century Spanish governor of Cartagena
- Melchor de Marchena (1907–1980), Spanish flamenco guitarist
- Melchor de Mediavilla y Azcona, governor of Texas between 1727 and 1731
- Melchor de Navarra, Duke of Palata (1626–1691), Spanish politician
- Melchor de Navarrete (1693–1761), Spanish soldier and administrator
- Melchor de Talamantes (1765–1809), Mexican friar and priest
- Melchior Díaz, an early Spanish explorer of Western North America
- Melchor Feliú, 18th century Florida governor
- Melchor Fernández Almagro (1893–1966), Spanish writer, historian, journalist and literary critic
- Melchor José Ramos (1805–1832), Chilean political figure and journalist
- Melchor Liñán y Cisneros (1629—1708), Spanish Roman Catholic prelate
- Melchor López (born 1913), Argentinean sports shooter
- Melchor Menor (born 1974), American kickboxer
- Melchor Múzquiz (1790–1844), Mexican soldier and politician
- Melchor Ocampo (1814–1861), Mexican lawyer, scientist, and liberal politician
- Melchor Palmeiro (1923–1997), Argentinean runner
- Melchor Peredo (1927–2026), Mexican muralist
- Melchor Portocarrero, 3rd Count of Monclova (1636–1705), viceroy of New Spain
- Melchor Rodríguez García (1893–1972), Spanish politician and statesman
- Melchor Sánchez de la Fuente (born 1963), Mexican politician
- Melchor Saucedo (1920–2014), bishop of the Episcopal Diocese of Western Mexico
- Melchor Soria Vera (died 1643, Spanish Roman Catholic prelate
- Melchor Yap (born 1940), Filipino sports shooter
- Melchor (actor) (1957–1995), American adult film actor and model

Surname

- Alejandro Melchor (1900–1947), Filipino civil engineer, mathematician, educator and politician
- Cruz Melchor Eya Nchama (born 1945), a judge at the Court of Geneva
- Federico Melchor (1915–1985), Spanish journalist and communist politician
- Inés Melchor (born 1986), Peruvian long-distance runner
- Jack Melchor (1925–2015), American engineer and venture capitalist
- José Melchor (born 1990), Mexican professional footballer
- Traci Melchor, Canadian television personality
