= Marten Schagen =

Marten Schagen (24 October 1700, in Alkmaar – 20 October 1770, in Utrecht) was a Dutch Mennonite bookseller, translator, journal editor and historian.

== Life ==
He was born in Alkmaar, moving to Amsterdam in 1718 where he set up a bookshop. He was minister to the "Arche Noe" congregation there from 1727 to 1738. In 1741 he moved to Utrecht as minister to the Mennonite congregation there.

== Works ==
Schagen published in 1732 a significant Dutch translation of Josephus by Adriaan Loosjes the Elder and Jan Lijnsz Rogge. In total he published around 70 titles. He also made 32 translations, mainly of theological works (from English and Swiss authors in particular) but also in science (Johann Leonhard Rost and Julius Bernhard von Rohr) and law (Jean-Jacques Burlamaqui). There were geographical works by Laugier de Tassy and Jonas Hanway.

Schagen's 1745 translation of the 1743 German history of the Mennonites by Simeon Friedrich Rues was a substantially improved edition and became a major work in the field. His 1745 bibliography of Mennonite literature was also the only such early work that was free-standing. He collected Anabaptist literature, and wrote a work on the Waldensians.
