= Antoon van den Heuvel =

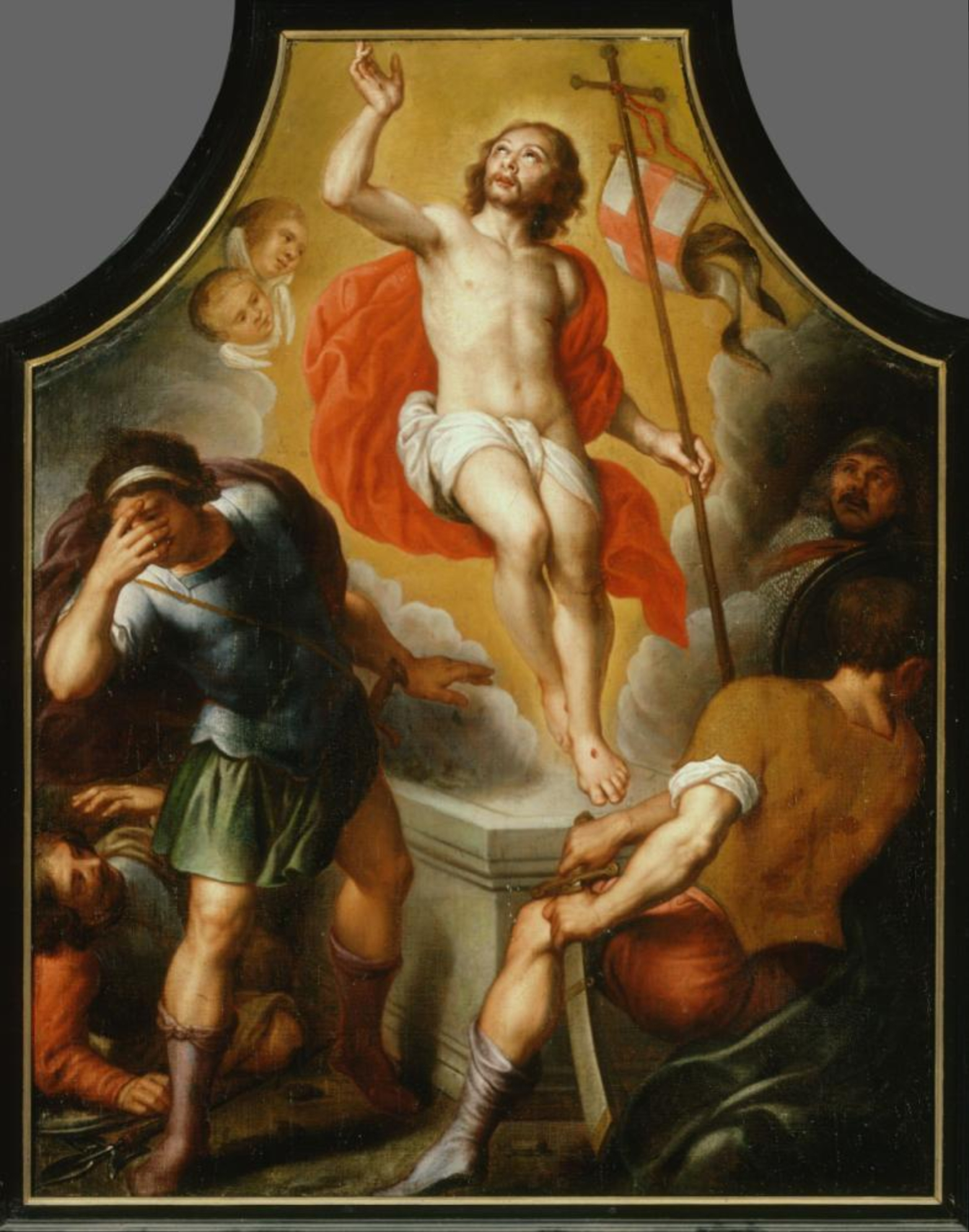
The resurrection of Christ

Antoon van den Heuvel, Antoine van den Heuvel or Anton van den Heuvel (nickname: 'don Antonio') (c. 1600 – 5 August 1677) was a Flemish history painter and draughtsman. After training and working in Antwerp and Rome, he returned to his native Ghent where he was one of the important creators of altarpieces for the churches in the region.

== Life ==
Little is known about his early life and training. He was born in Ghent. In the declaration he made when he was admitted as a master in the Guild of Saint Luke of Ghent in 1628, he stated that in the previous 10 years he had been working in Antwerp and Rome. He was given the nickname 'don Antonio' because of his stay in Italy.

Antoon van den Heuvel remained active for the rest of his life in Ghent and its neighbouring areas where he was particularly in demand for altarpieces. In 1662 he was responsible for the cleaning of the Ghent Altarpiece painted by the van Eyck brothers.

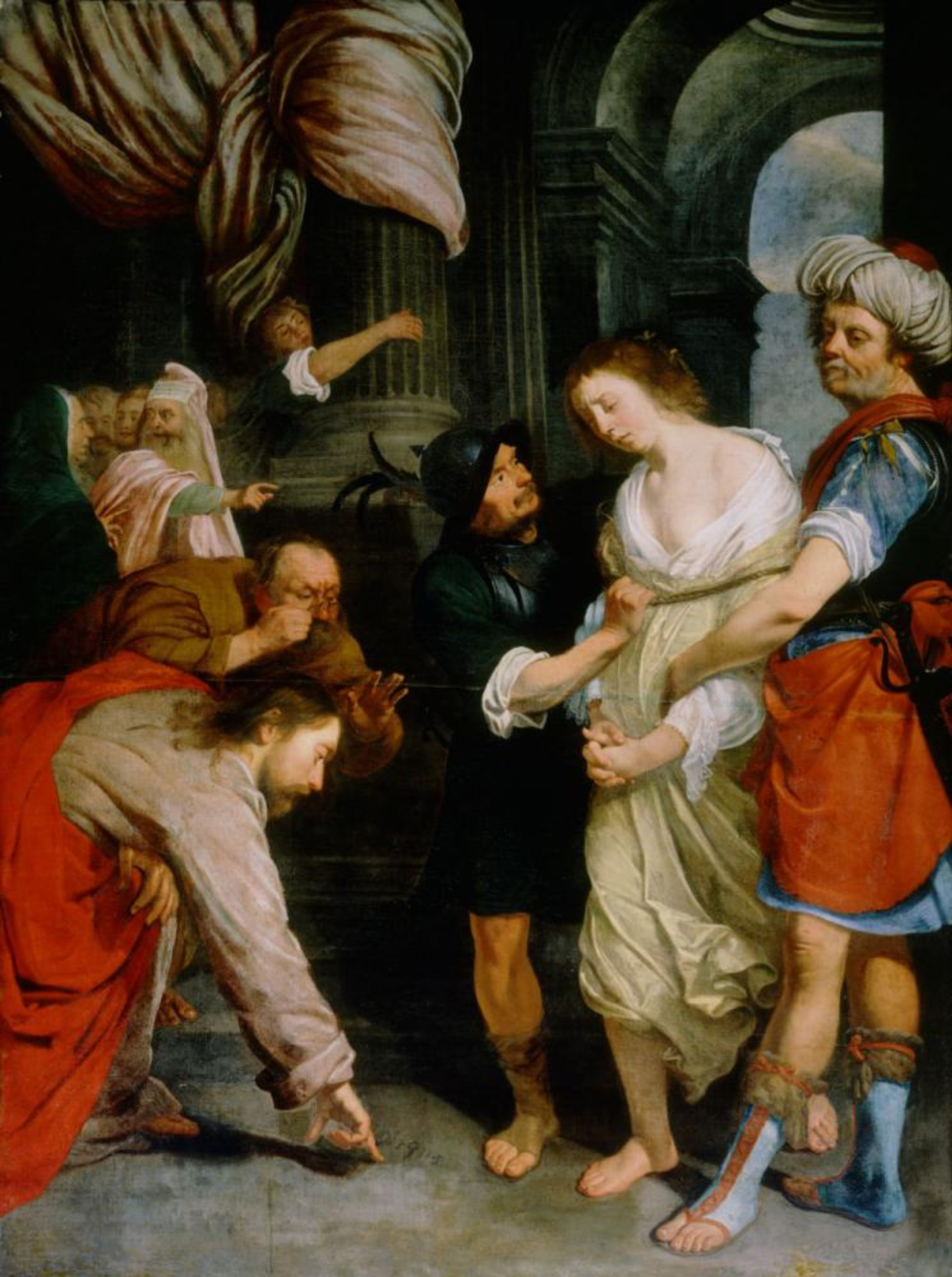
Christ and the adulterous woman

He died in Ghent.

== Work ==
Antoon van den Heuvel painted mainly religious scenes and portraits. He is usually regarded as a representative of the international Caravaggesque movement. His style is, however, not that easily reduced to the Caravaggesque movement. His early work showed a preference for contrasting colours and strong lighting, with little use of transitional tones. But compared to his contemporary Jan Janssens, one of the foremost representatives of the Ghent Caravaggisti, van den Heuvel rarely showed Caravaggesque elements. Only in one work, 'Mary with the Christ Child and the Rosary' of 1634 (Church of Nazareth, Belgium, he adopted one of the motifs of Caravaggio: 'The Madonna with the snake' (Rome, Galleria Borghese).

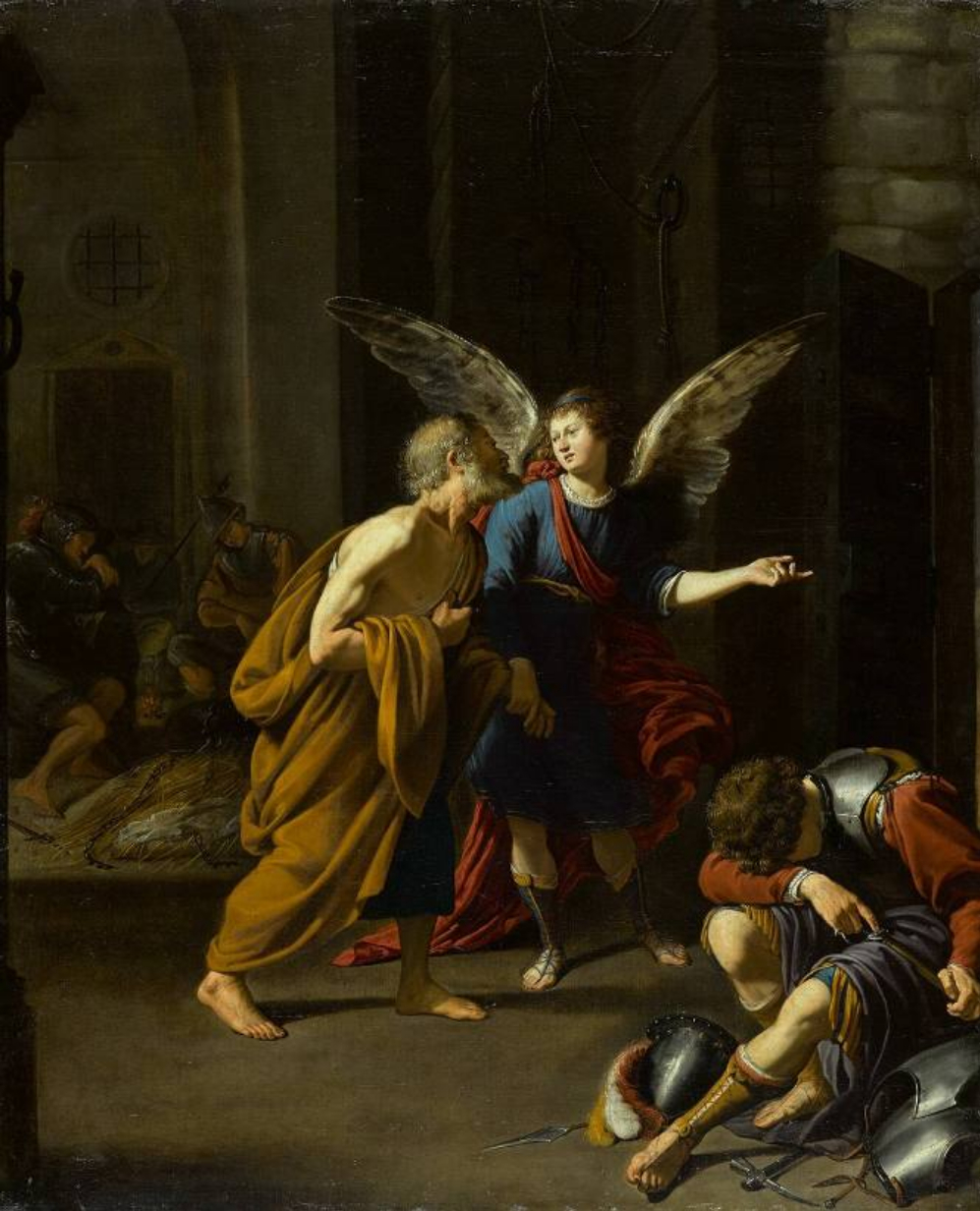
The Angel Liberating St. Peter

Van den Heuvel's style is in its linear compositions and bright lighting more Classicist in nature and closer to the work of Agostino Carracci, Annibale Carracci and Lodovico Carracci and their followers. He must have seen their work during his residence in Rome.

Van den Heuvel also borrowed motifs and compositions of contemporary Flemish painters such as Rubens and Caspar de Crayer. His Lamentation in the Church of Borsbeke relies upon a painting by the Dutch Carravagist Gerard van Honthorst of the same subject for its composition and a number of motifs.

His later work between 1640 and 1650 is less colourful and therefore appears less expressive.

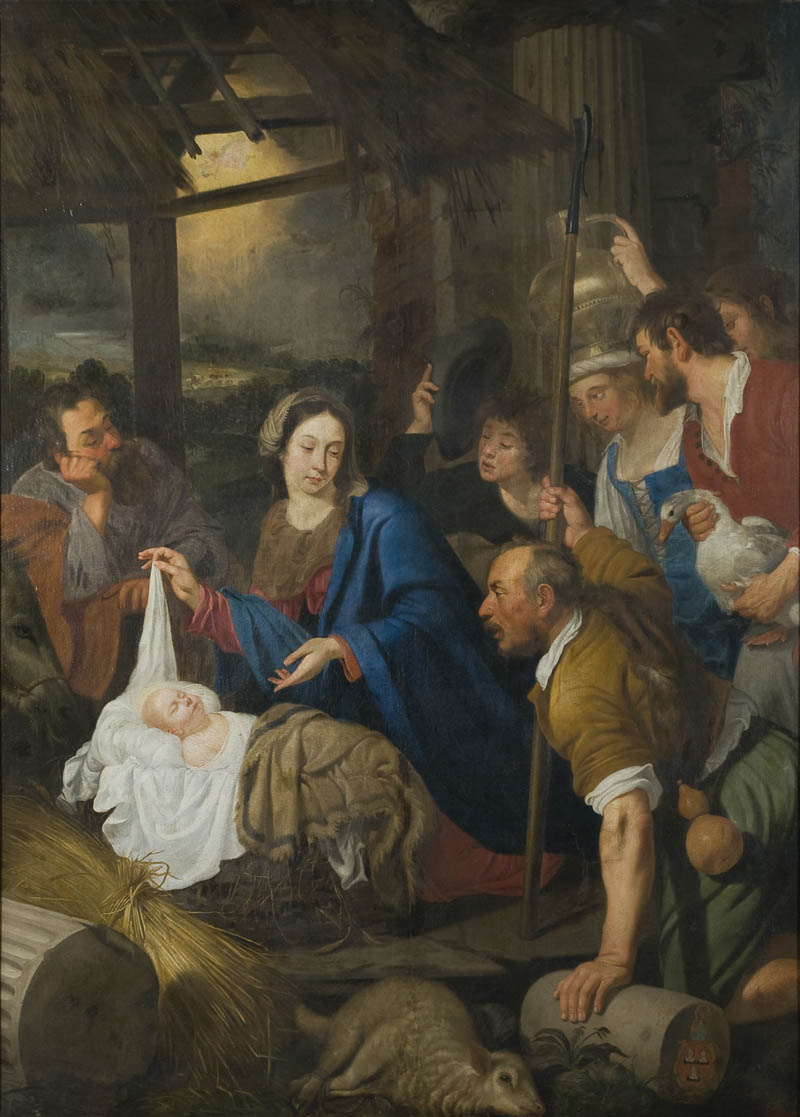
Adoration of the shepherds

Van den Heuvel also made designs for engravings. The paintings (some of them after designs by Rubens) that he (and other painters) made on the occasion of the Joyous Entry of Cardinal-Infante Ferdinand of Austria in Ghent in 1635 were engraved to be included in a publication authored by Willem van der Beke (Guilielmus Becanus). The publication entitled Serenissimi principis Ferdinandi Hispaniarum infantis S.R.E. cardinalis triumphalis introitus in Flandriae metropolim Gandavum was published by Johannes Meursius in Antwerp in 1636. Leading Antwerp engravers Jacob Neefs, Pieter de Jode II and Antony van der Does made the engravings for the publication.

A portrait painting made by van den Heuvel was used by the prominent engraver Paulus Pontius as the basis for his engraving of a portrait of the Flemish poet Jeremias Pierssene. Guillaume Duvivier, an engraver who was active in Ghent in the 17th century, made an engraving after a painting of Antoon van den Heuvel which shows two servant women in a kitchen. This genre subject is atypical for van den Heuvel who mainly painted religious scenes and portraits.
