= Veit Ludwig von Seckendorff =

German statesman and scholar

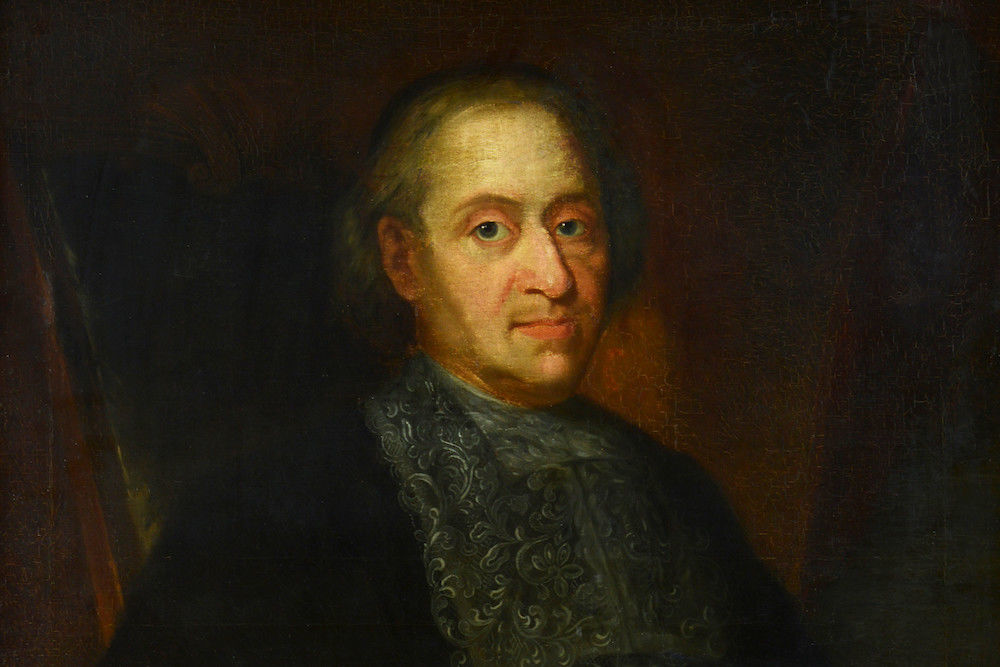
- Born: December 20, 1626; Herzogenaurach, near Erlangen, Holy Roman Empire
- Died: December 18, 1692 (aged 65); Meuselwitz, Altenburg, Holy Roman Empire
- Occupations: Statesman, Scholar
- Known for: Contributions to German public law and economics
- Notable work: Teutscher Fürstenstaat, Der Christen Stat, Commentarius Historicus et apologeticus de Lutheranismo sive de Reformatione

Veit Ludwig von Seckendorff or Seckendorf (Note: His surname is variously spelled in different sources. Early printings of his own Teutscher Fürstenstaat (1687) and Der Christen Stat (1693) have Seckendorff, while Commentarius Historicus (1688) has Seckendorf. Later reference sources also differ. Pahner (1892) has Seckendorff, while both Kolde (1906) and Chisholm (1911) have Seckendorf.) (December 20, 1626 – December 18, 1692), German statesman and scholar, was a member of the House of Seckendorff, a noble family which took its name from the village of Seckendorf between Nuremberg and Langenzenn. The family was divided into eleven distinct lines, widely distributed throughout Prussia, Württemberg, and Bavaria.

== Biography ==
Seckendorf, a son of Joachim Ludwig von Seckendorf, was born at Herzogenaurach, near Erlangen. As a youth, he became a protégé of the Duke of Saxe-Gotha, Ernest the Pious, and he was educated at the Ernestine Gymnasium, Gotha. His father, was actively engaged in the Thirty Years' War and was executed at Salzwedel in 1642 for his dealings with the Imperialists of the Holy Roman Empire. Entering the University of Strasbourg in 1642, the means for Seckendorf's higher education came from Swedish officers who were former comrades of his father. He devoted himself to history and jurisprudence, and at the end of his university years Duke Ernest gave him a position as hofjunker in his court at Gotha, where Seckendorf laid the foundation of his great collection of historical materials and mastered the principal modern languages.

In 1652, Seckendorf was appointed to judicial positions and also sent on foreign missions. In 1656, he was made a judge in the ducal court at Jena and took the leading part in the numerous beneficent reforms of the duke. In 1664, Duke Ernest made him his chancellor, but soon afterwards he resigned his offices at Jena, while remaining on excellent terms with its Duke, and entered the service of Duke Maurice of Zeitz (Altenburg), with the intention of lightening his official duties.

After the death of Maurice in 1681, Seckendorf retired to his estate, Meuselwitz in Altenburg, resigning nearly all his public offices. Although living in retirement, he kept up a correspondence with the principal learned men of the day. He was especially interested in the endeavours of the pietist Philipp Jakob Spener to effect a practical reform of the German church, although he was hardly himself a pietist. In 1692, he was appointed chancellor of the new University of Halle, but he died a few weeks afterwards.

Seckendorf's principal works were the following:

- Teutscher Fürstenstaat (1656 and 1678), a handbook of German public law
- Der Christen Stat (1685), partly an apology for Christianity and partly suggestions for the reformation of the church, founded on Pascal's Pensées and embodying the fundamental ideas of Spener
- Commentarius Historicus et apologeticus de Lutheranismo sive de Reformatione (3 vols., Leipzig, 1692), occasioned by the Jesuit Maimbourg's Histoire du Luthéranisme (Paris, 1680), his most important work, and still indispensable to the historian of the Reformation as a rich storehouse of authentic materials.

== Economic writings ==
Seckendorff is widely regarded as the "founder" of early economics in Germany of Cameralism. Having survived the horrors of the Thirty Years' War and the resulting economic, political and moral breakdown of society, Seckendorff conceived of a holistic science of public administration fit to reconstruct the more than 300 independent German principalities recognized by the Peace of Westphalia. The science he envisioned was both theoretical and practical, covering all the needs of a small principality. The same union of active and contemplative characterizes Seckendorff's own life, as he devoted himself both to administrating the Court of Gotha and the University of Halle, both to write an "owner's handbook" (Teutscher Fürstenstaat, "The German Principality") to small principalities and one of the most celebrated defenses of Lutheranism.

== Thought ==
In his principal work, Teutsche Fürsten Staaten, a handbook of civil administration, Seckendorff created what is considered the seminal work of German Cameralism. In it, he described the situation of the country, the government institutions, and Seckendorff's recommended way to manage the prince's holdings, including his demesne and monopolies, so as to maximize state revenues. Seckendorff held a paternalistic view of the economy, advocating state involvement in population growth, education, usury prevention, trade regulation, contract law, and resource allocation.

Seckendorff is termed a "quasi-absolutist" by Albion Small, in the sense that he did not believe the old view that the will of the prince was the will of God, but he did believe God was the only power authorized to discipline the prince. With view to economics, Small terms Seckendorff "the Adam Smith of cameralism."

In Seckendorff, government consists in maintenance of the common advantage of things spiritual and material, with the final end of human actions being the glory of God, with the authorities serving as "God's deputies." This includes the religious duties of the prince, restored by the Reformation.

To Seckendorff, the four chief duties of the prince are: (1) establish power as a means of suppressing disorder, (2) establish good laws and ordinances to promote righteousness and peace, (3) serve as supreme adjudicator, (4) use all means necessary in the establishment of institutions to protect the foregoing activities from foreign and domestic enemies.

According to Seckendorff, subjects are not slaves of the ruler or the state; rather, they are under the government of (divinely-appointed) authorities so that their welfare and souls are protected according to both natural and imperial law. The government is to "cherish" its subjects. Nevertheless, the dignity of government is treated as an end in itself.
