= Georg Obrecht =

16th-century German law professor

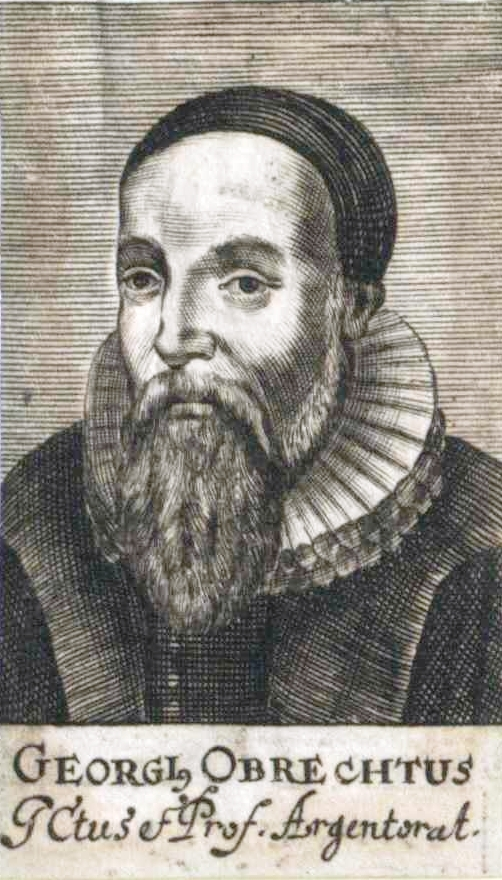

Georg Obrecht (born March 25, 1547) was a German law professor and prominent developer of Cameralist thought.

== Biography ==
Obrecht was born in 1547. He studied law at a variety of universities, including Tübingen, Heidelberg, Besançon, Dôle, and Orléans. After escaping death as a Protestant amidst the St. Bartholomew's Day Massacre, he returned to Strasbourg and eventually obtained a professorship at his own high school.

Obrecht had a successful career, remaining in his post until his death. He was the first to teach procedural law and public law in Strasbourg.

== Work ==
Obrecht's principle work was Fünff underschiedliche Secreta Politica, composed as an administrative handbook for Rudolf II.

== Thought ==
Obrecht emphasized the importance of both thrift and moral conduct for rulers, cautioning that otherwise there would not be enough state revenues collected.

As a means to this end, Obrecht aimed to improve the life conditions of subjects. Obrecht posits that rulers must make sure they have adequate funds to pay civil servants, or else risk exposing their own subjects to injustices.

=== Insurance Policy ===
One of Obrecht's more concrete proposals was the creation of an insurance scheme for children. Parents would make regular payments to the government for their children. Upon reaching maturity, the child beneficiary would be paid the total of the fund along with 6 percent interest. If the child died before reaching maturity, however, the money would be kept by the government. Obrecht maintained that this program was mutually beneficial for both the government and subjects.

=== Bona oikonomia ===
Obrecht desired that for resource gathering, states employ bona oikonomia, which to him meant good and thrifty administration. He says that this is good because it does not impose a burden on the subjects.

=== Finance and Commerce ===
Obrecht condemned the practice of currency debasement, pointing out that it reduced the value of coinage and had a negative impact, was illegal under the laws of the Holy Roman Empire, and invited the punishment of God.

Obrecht took a stance against the traditional view that commerce was an inappropriate pursuit for members of the nobility, with the view that this would reduce the financial burden on subjects. He advocated that the government encourage navigation and pay merchants in advance for foreign goods, as well as stockpile commodities such as wine and foodstuffs in case of scarcity.

Similarly, Obrecht urged the promotion of artisanship and the facilitation of fairs and markets to create a thriving economy. He also anticipated later cameralistic doctrine condemning foreign debt, stating it was preferable to borrow money from one's own subjects.

=== Policey ===
With regards to Policey, Obrecht gives two aspects: (1) census and censorship, and (2) reliable information and science concerning structure and organization. On censorship, Obrecht notes that measures can be either preventive or punitive, but laments that the censors of his time know nothing of preventive policies. He emphasizes that the goal of police policy should be to improve popular morale, and not merely to deter crime. Albion Small notes that it was increasingly typical of German political theory to assume a government role in safeguarding and promoting public morality. Obrecht personally prescribed that the police order should keep reliable information on all subjects and endeavor to protect them from ruin, and also providing for parents to bring up their children usefully and in such a way that parent and child lead a "Christian, worthy life."
