= Jan Janssens =

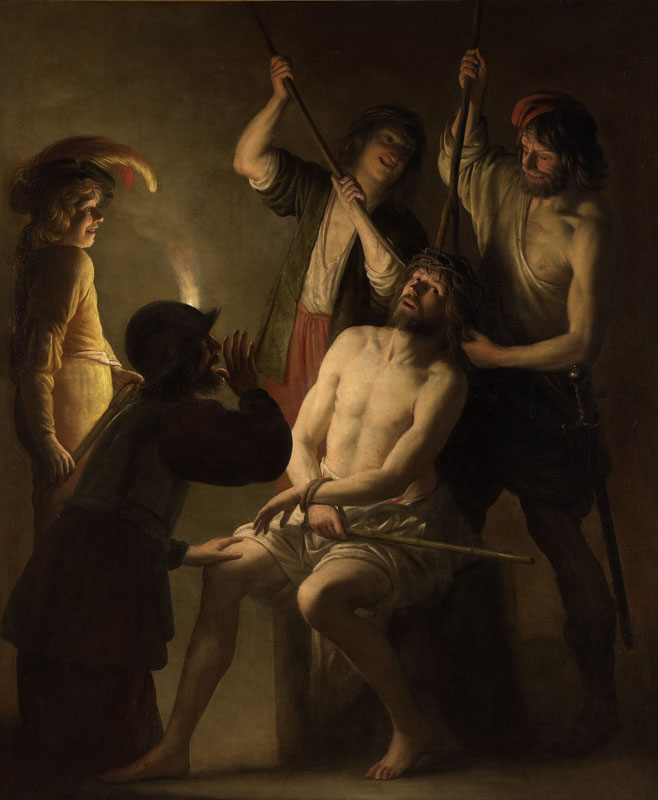
The Crowning with Thorns

Jan Janssens (August 1590 in Ghent – after 1650) was a Flemish Baroque painter and draftsman who is considered to be the most important of the so-called Ghent Caravaggisti. These Caravaggisti were part of an international movement of European artists who interpreted the work of Caravaggio and the followers of Caravaggio in a personal manner. Janssens altarpieces and other compositions offering very realistic representations of religious motifs adorn many churches in and around Ghent. He also worked on commissions for international patrons.

== Life ==
Jan Janssens was born in Ghent in 1590 as the son of Johannes Govaert Janssens. There is no information available about his training. He was in Rome in the period 1619-1620. Janssens returned to Ghent in 1621 and was admitted to the Ghent Guild of St. Luke as a master. From 1634-1635 and in 1646 Janssens was dean of the Ghent Guild of St. Luke.

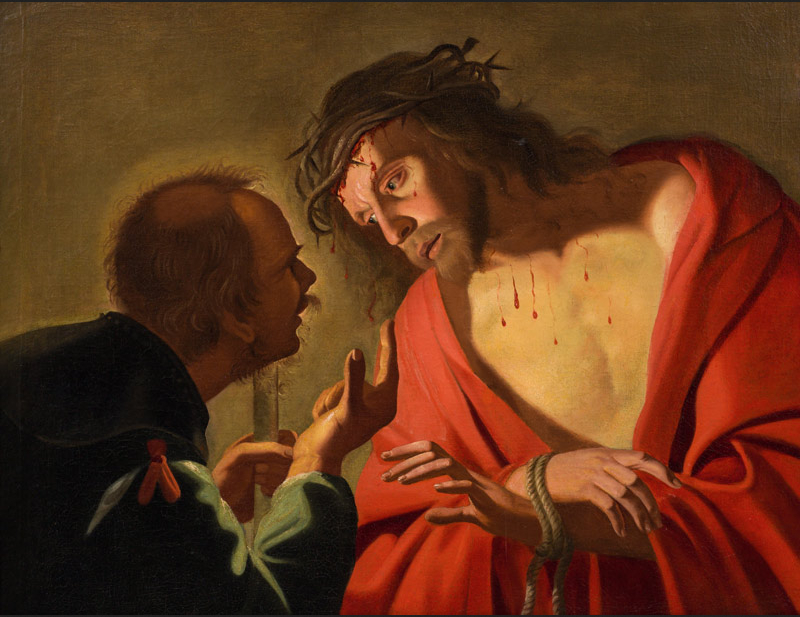
The Mocking of Christ

On 29 August 1623, he married Petronilla de Rop with whom he had 6 children. In 1640, he was commissioned by the Brotherhood of Our Lady of Radiën to make a work for the Saint Bavo Cathedral in Ghent. The painting was delivered four years later but was not executed by Janssens, but by Nicolas de Liemaker.

Jan Janssens died in Ghent around 1650. His house, De Pijl (The Arrow), is sold.

== Work ==
Jan Janssens’ known work is fairly limited. During his stay in Italy Janssens came into contact with Dutch painters like Dirck van Baburen, Gerard van Honthorst and Hendrick ter Brugghen. These Dutch artists were followers of the style of Caravaggio and are known as the Dutch or Utrecht Caravaggisti, after their main centre in Utrecht, where there was still a sizeable and prosperous Catholic population. Their work influenced him stylistically. He was also influenced by the work of Bartolomeo Manfredi. Janssens took the Caravaggio style back with him to Ghent and he is considered to be one of the Ghent Caravaggisti along with Antoon van den Heuvel and Melchior de la Mars. He worked principally on commissions for altarpieces.

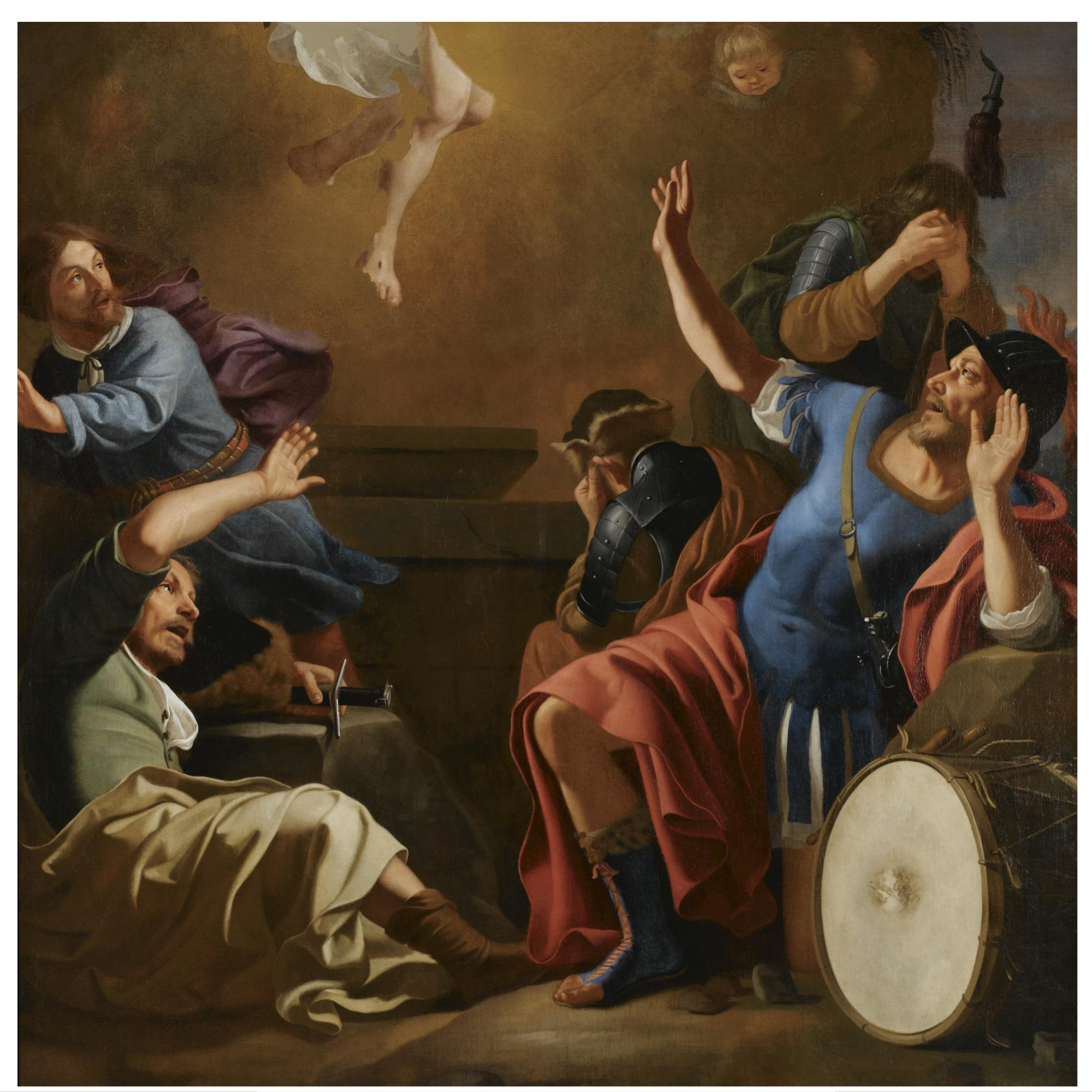
The Resurrection

His chief subject matter are biblical and, to a lesser extent, mythological themes painted in a large format. His favourite themes are Christ crowned with thorns and the mocking of Christ. He also returned various times to the theme of the Caritas Romana, even making one version (1620-1625, Real Academia de Bellas Artes de San Fernando) based very closely on a work by Dirck van Baburen on the same theme.

He also painted various versions of the Resurrection of Christ. The principal version is the one in the St. Salvator's Cathedral in Bruges. In this composition he shows his originality and his independence of the Utrecht Caravaggisti and other Caravaggisti. The inspiration for the work may be an anonymous Italian Mannerist drawing. In this work he also made an effort to depict the materials such as the weapons and armour, beards, fabrics, fur and drums in a very realistic manner. He also distanced himself from the Utrecht Caravaggisti by not giving the figures excessive expressions but rather realistic emotional expressions.

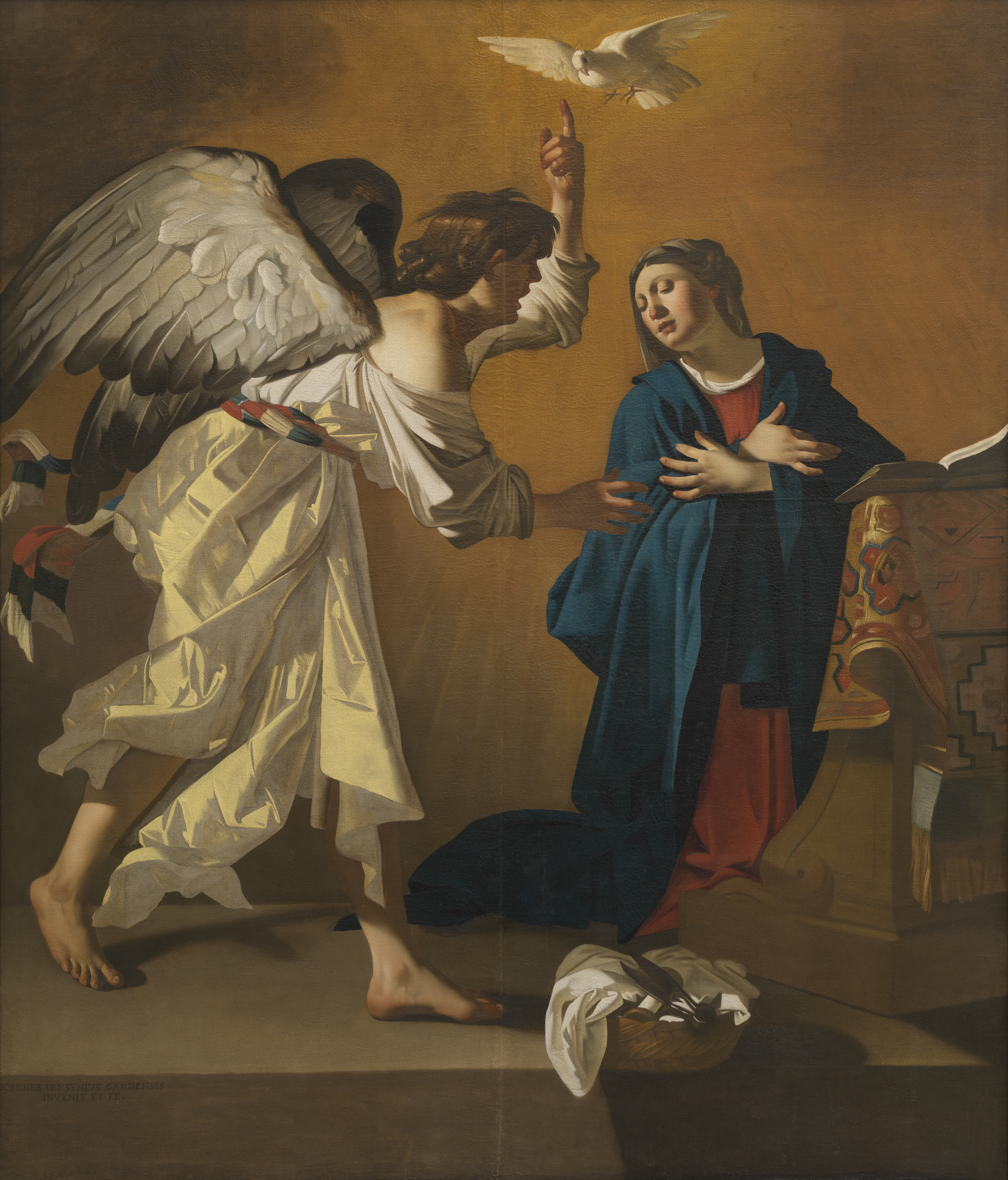
The Annunciation

Janssens' work conforms to the prescriptions of the Counter Reformation and the Baroque through its merciless and sober realism and dramatic effects with hidden light that shines on his figures. These effects were intended to ensure a strong emotional impact on the viewer.

One of his masterpieces is The Martyrdom of Saint Barbara (which in fact deals with Saint Agatha), which is kept in the Saint Michael's Church, Ghent.
