= Melchior (disambiguation) =

Melchior is both a given name and a surname.

Melchior may also refer to:

- The Melchior system of taxonomy
- A melchior, a wine bottle holding 18 litres
- Melchior (alloy), an alloy of copper and nickel used to manufacture cutlery
- Melchior, a brand of ale brewed by Picobrouwerij Alvinne, Ingelmunster Belgium
- Melchior Base, an Argentine Antarctic base
