= Cameralism =

18th-century German centralist economic theory

Cameralism (German: Kameralismus) was a German school of public finance, administration and economic management in the 18th and early 19th centuries that aimed at strong management of a centralized economy for the benefit mainly of the state. The discipline in its narrowest definition concerned the management of the state's finances. Throughout the 18th and the first half of the 19th century, cameralism was influential in Northern European states—for example, in Prussia and Sweden—and its academics and practitioners were pioneers in economic, environmental, and administrative knowledge and technology; for example, cameralist accounting is still used in public finance today.

Historian of Central Europe Martyn Rady has suggested it was the study of how states and institutions might maximise revenues both for their defence and for their citizens to enlarge people’s wealth and happiness. He stresses some understood it to mean creating the conditions for happiness, with it was the individual’s right to determine their reaction to the world, while most assumed that individuals could not be trusted and government should intervene.

The growing power of centralized state control necessitated centralized systematic information on the nation. A major innovation was the collection, use and interpretation of numerical and statistical data, ranging from trade statistics, harvest reports, and death notices to population censuses. Starting in the 1760s, officials in France and Germany began increasingly to rely on quantitative data for systematic planning, especially regarding long-term economic growth. It combined the utilitarian agenda of "enlightened absolutism" with the new ideas being developed in economics. In Germany and France, the trend was especially strong in cameralism and physiocracy. According to David F. Lindenfeld, it was divided into three: public finance, Oeconomie and Polizei. Here Oeconomie did not exactly mean 'economics', nor did Polizei mean 'public policy' in the modern senses.

== Cameral, Oeconomie, and Polizei ==
Cameralism distinguished between three subfields: cameral, Oeconomie, and Polizei (or Policey). Cameral, or Cameralwissenschaft, designated the science of public finance, administered for the state's benefit. Oeconomie was not strictly economic, but designated all that encompassed the relationship between the state and society, with a goal of certain social outcomes. Polizei referred to the actual implementation of government policy – in a way it was the study of tools that the government might use.

== Influence on early modern development ==
Cameralism as a science is closely connected with the development of bureaucracy in the early modern period because it was a method aimed at increasing the efficiency of cameralists—not only referring to the academics devoted to the science but to those employed in the Kammer, the state administration. Cameralism was associated with the early modern term oeconomics, which had a broader meaning than the modern term economics as it entailed the stewardship of households, both public, private and by extension the state itself. Thus, oeconomics was a broader domain in which the investigation of nature merged seamlessly with concerns for material and moral well-being, in which the inter-dependence of urban and rural productivity was appreciated and stewarded, in which "improvement" was simultaneously directed toward increasing the yields of agriculture, manufacturing and social responsibility.

This further shaped cameralism as a wide discipline aimed at creating an overview of knowledge needed by an enlightened administrator. It also illustrates that practitioners of cameralism were a heterogeneous group that not only served the interest of the state but also that of the growing cadres of academics, scientists and technological experts striving for the favour of the state in order to further their own interests as well as being oeconomic patriots.

== Cameralism and mercantilism ==
There are some similarities between cameralism as an economic theory and the French mercantilist school of Jean-Baptiste Colbert, which has sometimes caused cameralism to be viewed as a German version of mercantilism, as both emphasised import substitution and a strong state-directed economic life. However, cameralism was developed with regard to the landlocked nature of many of the German states of the 18th century and attempted to substitute the whole production process, whereas mercantilism relied on access to raw materials and goods from the colonial periphery. Furthermore, defining cameralism as an early modern school of economy does not accurately portray the scope of the body of knowledge included in cameralism.

== Academic status ==
During the 18th century, cameralism spread through the lands of Prussia, the Holy Roman Empire and beyond. Professorial chairs in Cameralism were also created in Sweden and Denmark–Norway Foremost among the professors in cameralism was Johann Heinrich Gottlob Justi (1717–1771), who linked Cameralism and the idea of natural law with each other. However, most cameralists were practitioners, not academics, and worked in the burgeoning bureaucracies sometimes supporting and other times shunning the science. Whether Cameralism was a technology that was applied to the different branches of the state and the economy decisively shaping it or whether it was a university science has been a major debate in modern research of Cameralism. Much debate has traditionally centered on exactly which writings classify as Cameralism. However, the work of Keith Tribe, who holds cameralism to be a university science disconnected from the actual activities of the administrators, sparked a counter-reaction and shifted the debate to include the practitioners of Cameralism. The shift is evident in the work of David Lindenfeld and Andre Wakefield, which illustrates the dynamics between theory and practice among cameralists.

Although the precise legacy and nature of Cameralism remains disputed, it has affected modern public finance, not only by shaping the formation of state administration but also by giving rise to cameralistic accounting, a particular system predominately used in the German public sector which has outlived the rest of the science. The system has been deemed suitable for bookkeeping under conditions posed by public enterprises or services, such as constructing and maintaining infrastructure, and providing healthcare or education, since these services, if paid for, constitute a form of indirect taxation rather than a transaction on an open market.

Justi based much of his inspiration for cameralistic studies to contemporary accounts of the Chinese imperial bureaucracy. The growth of cameralist studies, which played an important role in Prussian civil service training, may be traced to Justi's admiration for the imperial examinations of China. Justi, like other cameralists, also lauded many Chinese public policies apart from its administrative system.

== Cameralism in Prussia ==
The first academic chairs in the cameral sciences were created at the Prussian Universities of Halle and Frankfurt an der Oder, in 1727, by Frederick William I, who perceived a need for greater administrative skill in the growing Prussian bureaucracy. Cameralist teachings departed from the traditional legal and experience-based education usually given to civil servants and focused instead on a broad overview of classical philosophy, natural sciences and economic practices such as husbandry, farming, mining and accounting. However, provision of a cameralist education was also directed towards the gentry as a way to instill the values of thrift and prudence among landowners, thus increasing incomes from their estates. Prussian cameralism was focused on the state, enhancing its efficiency and increasing its revenue through strengthening the power of the developing bureaucracy, by means of standardisation of both the bureaucracy’s own practices as well as the economy, enabling greater extraction of wealth. There is, however, considerable debate about whether cameralist policy reflected the stated goals of academic cameralism.

== Cameralism in Sweden ==
Cameralism gained traction in Sweden after the country had lost most of its possessions in Pomerania and the Baltic region after its defeat in the Great Northern War. The Swedish example shows how cameralism, as a part of the early modern concept of economy, gave rise to a wide range of activity today associated with public and social policy. Around the highly developed Swedish bureaucracy coalesced a structure of entrepreneurs, educators and scientists that strove to mobilise the resources of the country for the betterment of the population and strengthening of the state. Cameralism in this sense fostered a cadre of naturalists and administrators serving as experts engaging in economic activity, that were not necessarily administrative officials, although, associated with the state and utilising the well developed administration. In Sweden, this is exemplified by the botanist Carl Linnaeus and his pupils, who were prominent advocates of cameralism and strove both to cultivate foreign cash crops such as tea and the Mulberry tree, on the leaves of which the silk worm feeds, and to find domestic substitute for imports such as coffee, projects that even though they were failures entrenched the role of the scientist and the expert as a useful instrument of state interests.

== Cameralist theorists ==
- Melchior von Osse
- Georg Obrecht
- Veit Ludwig von Seckendorff
- Johann Joachim Becher
- Phillip Wilhelm von Hornick
- Wilhelm von Schröder
- Ephraim Gerhard
- Julius Bernhard von Rohr
- Simon Peter Gasser
- Justus Christoph Dithmar
- Georg Heinrich Zincke
- Johann Heinrich Gottlob von Justi
- Joachim Georg Darjes
- Joseph von Sonnenfels
- Christian Wilhelm von Dohm
