= Majcher =

Majcher is a surname and a given name, a vernacular form of "Melchior". Variants: Maycher, Maicher. Notable people with this name include:

- Anna Majcher (born 1962), Polish stage and film actress
- Helena Pilejczyk née Majcher (born 1931), Polish speed skater
- Joseph Majcher (born 1960), Polish-born Canadian soccer player
- Stanisław Majcher (1936–2014), Polish footballer
