= Melchor (actor) =

American actor and model (1957–1995)

- Born: Susano Melchor Rios; August 16, 1957; Kleberg County, Texas, U.S.
- Died: June 27, 1995 (aged 37); Pineville, Rapides Parish, Louisiana, U.S.
- Other names: Melchor Diaz; Melchor; Melchor Agular; Mendy Melchor Almagher
- Occupations: Actor; Model
- Years active: 1976–1994
- Agent: Falcon Studios

Susano Melchor Rios (August 16, 1957 – June 27, 1995), known professionally by his screen names Melchor Diaz and Melchor, was an American adult film actor and model. He achieved significant popularity during the late 1970s, 1980s, and 1990s recognized as one of the earliest prominent Latino stars of the "Golden Age" of gay adult cinema.

== Early life ==
Rios was born in Kleberg County, Texas, into a traditional Mexican-American family. Rios had turbulent childhood shaped by profound religious indoctrination.

As an infant, Rios suffered an accidental fall, leaving his mother fearing he had died. Seeking spiritual intervention, she took him to the shrine of the Virgin of San Juan in San Juan, Texas, praying for his survival. In exchange, she vowed to God and the Virgin Mary to let his hair grow long. Rios recalled that his hair remained uncut until he entered elementary school, causing him severe childhood confusion regarding his gender identity. Throughout his youth, the cut hair was regularly returned to the shrine as an offering.

== Career ==
=== Modeling ===
In tandem with his film work, Rios was a prominent print model for the premier gay erotic publications of the era. He was featured in numerous photo editorials and centerfolds for publications including, Honcho, Stallion, Skinflicks, Manshots, and Men of Advocate Men.

=== Film Industry ===
Rios entered the adult film industry in 1976 at the age of 19. Billed predominantly as Melchor and Melchor Diaz, his striking, highly masculine Latino features and handsome appearance quickly made him a major box-office draw. His career successfully spanned the industry's technological transition from theatrical loops to the home VHS tape market.

Rios appeared in nearly 30 feature films for major East Coast and West Coast adult studios. He made his feature debut in the cult classic Mustang (1978). His most prolific era occurred in the mid-1980s, anchoring mainstream features such as Pieces of Eight (1980), Nighthawk in Leather (1982), Dynastud (1986), and Room for Rent (1986). He occasionally used variations of his name, appearing as "Mel Chor" in Starshots, Volume Four (1986) and "Melchor Agular" in Hunk (1985). Rios officially retired from screen acting following the releases of The Night Boys (1989) and Los Hombres! (1991).

== Personal life ==
In private life, Rios was noted by peers and community members for a deeply gentle and charitable disposition. Despite his aggressive on-screen persona, he frequently rescued stray animals and regularly bought hot meals for the homeless populations in his neighborhood.

== Death ==
Rios died from AIDS-related complications on June 27, 1995, at a hospital in Pineville, Rapides Parish, Louisiana. He was 37 years old. He was buried under his legal birth name, Susano Melchor Rios, in public cemetery registries.

== Filmography ==
=== Film ===
Year	Title	Role	Notes
1978	Raging Glory	Melchor Diaz	Debut
1979	Mustang	Chris	
1979	Room for Rent	Lance	
1980	Dinastud	Melchor	
1980	Pieces of Eight	Ashton	
1981	Performance	Wyman	
1982	Nighthawk in Leather	Stefano	
1983	Revenge of the Nighthawk in Leather	Trevor	
1983	Wrestling Meat 1	Diego	
1985	Bondage Tease	Mason	
1985	Hunk	Melchor Agular	
1985	International Skin	Albert	
1985	Life Guard	Melchor Diaz	
1985	Night Flight	Jeffery	
1985	Room for Rent	Melchor Diaz	
1985	Strange Places... Strange Things!	Peter	
1985	Windows	Williams	
1986	Dock 9	Melchor Diaz	
1986	Down to His Knee	Melchor Diaz	
1986	Dynastud 1	Ivan	
1986	Hard	Manny	
1986	Hard to Believe!	John	
1986	Hollywood Gigolo	Melchor Diaz	
1986	Nightcrawler: A Leathersex Fantasy	Matt	
1986	Oral Orgy	Melchor Diaz	
1986	Social Studies	Tom	
1986	Star Shots 4: Melchor Diaz	Melchor Diaz	
1986	Stiff Sentence	Melchor Diaz	
1987	Daddy's Plaything	Melchor Diaz	
1987	The Best Stallions	Melchor Diaz	
1988	Beef	Melchor	
1988	Bottoms: Hot Shots 15	Melchor	
1988	Foreskin: Stroke 10	Sexy Man	
1989	Eagle Pack 8	Roman	
1989	More Uncut Men	Chad	
1989	The Night Boys	Ivan	Cinderfella
1989	Sexy Billy Blue	Bill	
1991	Los Hombres!	Handsome Guy	
1991	Magnum Griffin Collection, Volume 7	Melchor Diaz	
1991	Traffic School Was Never Like This!	Latino Boy	
1993	Bad Boys 24	Melchor	
1993	I'm in the Palm of your Hand!	Melchor Agular	
1993	Uncut Club 5	Melchor	
1994	Hot Chili Peppers 2	Melchor Diaz	
1994	Peter Pepper 6: Disappearing	Frank	
1994	Sausage Suckers	Ross	
1994	Skin (Vivid)	Steve	
1995	Blond Bottoms: Hot Shots 18	Melchor	
2004	Buttboys of the Barrio 1	Melchor Diaz	Posthumous released
2004	The Filth and the Furry	Melchor Diaz	Posthumous released
2006	Pole Smokers	Melchor Diaz	Posthumous released
2011	Falcon 40th Anniversary Collector's Edition	Melchor Diaz	Posthumous released
2011	Fuck Me Raw 2	Melchor Diaz	Posthumous released
2013	Deep Driving Dildos, Falcon Bareback 15	Melchor Diaz	Posthumous released
2013	Massive Bareback Ballers	Melchor Diaz	Posthumous released
2021	Falcon Icons: The 1980s	Melchor Diaz	Posthumous released
2024	Custom Cock Commandos	Melchor Diaz	Posthumous released

== Legacy ==
Following his death, his life and contributions have been documented by LGBTQ+ preservation groups such as The AIDS Memorial and digital film historians. His niece later publicly reflected on his impact, noting that witnessing the cruelty directed toward him at the end of his life inspired her to pursue a career as an attorney fighting for justice.
