= Melchior Polowy =

Brother Melchior Polowy CSC (1911–1997) was a Catholic member of the Congregation of Holy Cross. He was one of the principal founders of high school wrestling in Louisiana.

He entered the Congregation of Holy Cross at St. Joseph's Novitiate in Rolling Prairie, Indiana, and took his vows in 1939. Brother Polowy's teams at Holy Cross High School in New Orleans won 22 state championships from 1945 to 1968. Brother Melchior retired from coaching in 1971 and was honored 36 years later, and ten years posthumously by the Louisiana chapter of the National Wrestling Hall of Fame for his work. After retiring from coaching Brother Melchior remained at Holy Cross High School as an educator, teaching both religion classes and weight-lifting classes through the 1970s and '80s. Brother Melchior died in November 1997 at the age of 86 of pneumonia at Dujarie House in Notre Dame, Indiana. In 2002, he was the subject of a book about his work in wrestling.
