= Melchior von Osse =

German theoretician (1506–1556)

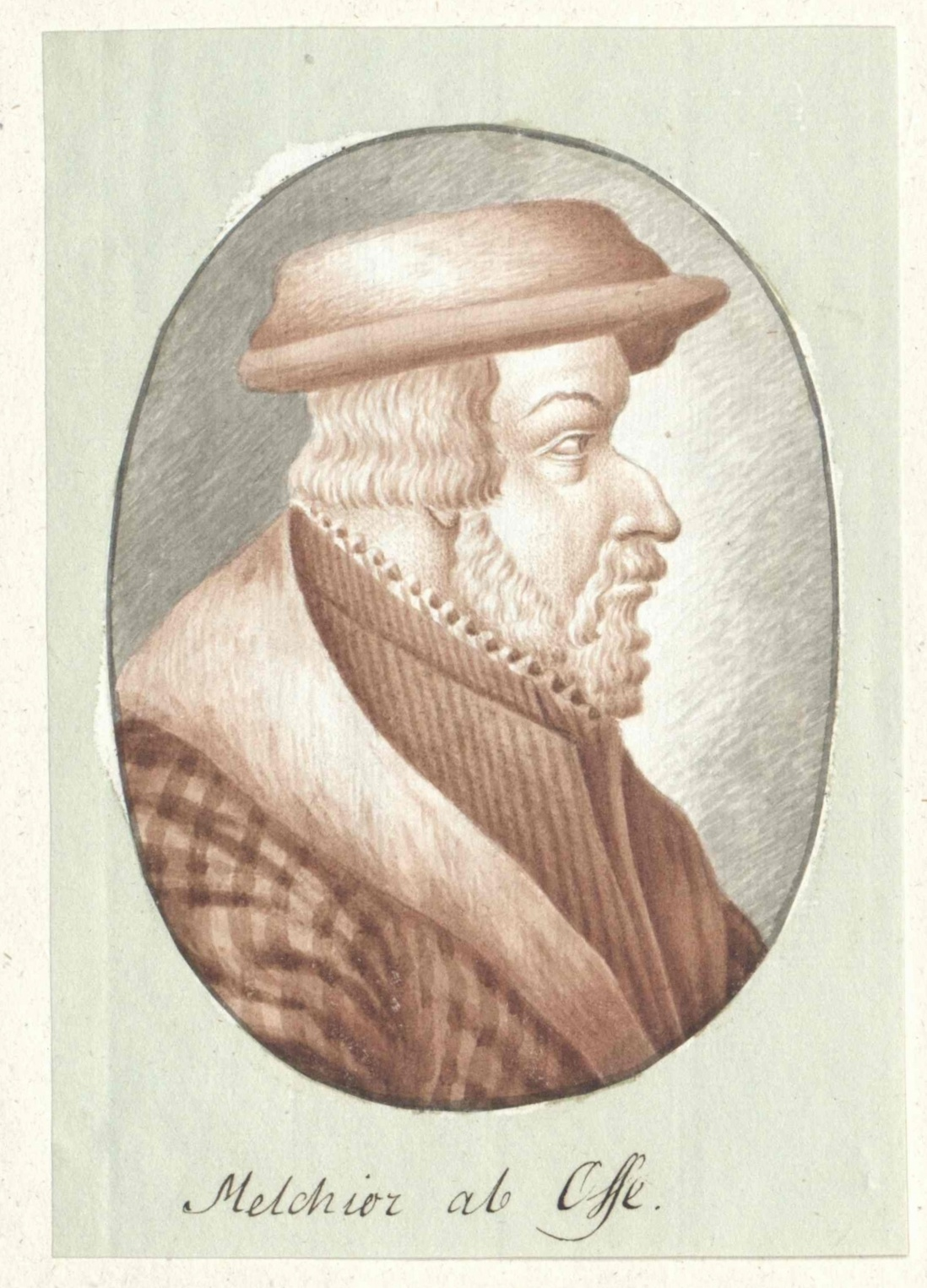
Melchior von Osse

Melchior von Osse (1506–1556) was a German theoretician who is best known as the author of the Testament, a treatise on politics and political reform. He is considered an early example of Cameralist thought.

== Early life ==
Osse was born in the town of Geithan in the hamlet of Ossa in 1506. He attended the University of Leipzig to study law, and was held in high esteem there. Though his name derives from his place of birth, Ossa, he signed his name "Osse." Despite being a supporter of the Reformation, he was accused by some Lutheran theologians, including Philipp Melanchthon, of harboring latent Roman Catholic sympathies. One of the justifications for this charge was his alleged use of the Latin Vulgate instead of the new German translation of the Bible.

== Work ==
Osse's principle work is the Testament, a treatise meant to serve as political handbook which fell into obscurity soon after its publication. However, it was rediscovered in the 18th century by Christian Thomasius, who subsequently republished it, accompanied by extensive annotation.

== Thought ==
Osse asserts that the magistracy has responsibilities in both war and peace. In war, good government must demonstrate its competence through "manly deeds," intelligent projects, and the protection of both subjects and territory. In peace, righteous government, judiciary, and Policey must be maintained. This included overseeing common rights and laws as a means in service of domestic peace and welfare.

Osse praised electoral Saxony as a good example of the keeping of learned functionaries at court who were competent enough to render right decisions and advice. As a positive result of such conduct he gives the example of "good and proper coinage" which encouraged trade and increased princely revenues.

Osse posited that subjects of all classes needed to obey the prince, and that attempts at improvement were justified because they were important for the common welfare of all classes, in spite of those who protested out of their own selfishness. He also cautioned that nepotism and defective child-rearing could lead to a lack of competent public officials.

=== Policey ===
In his discussion on Policey, Osse references Aristotle as saying that there are four parts of good Policey: Princeps, Concilium, Praelorium, and Populus. Osse relates that these correspond to the facets of ruler, wise counsel, unpartisan judicature, and (pious and obedient) subjects.

Christian Thomasius expands on Policey in his annotation of Osse's work. Policey consists of both an internal and external condition. The internal condition relates to the vigor of society as found in the growth of its people in things of the soul, such as happiness, religious worship, virtue, and education; and also in things of the body, such as abundant means-of-life, health, and security. The external condition relates to the "good order" of people, places, and things. Policey is meant to counteract such things as are harmful to the state, namely population decline, irreligion, vicious life, neglect of education, lack of sustenance, epidemics, revolts and violence, "confusion of social strata, affairs...", uncultivated land, and abandoned urban centers and towns. In the anonymous work that Thomasius quotes, the author recommends a Policey bureau, which could address these issues by maintaining order, establishing regular tribunals, employing watchmen and detectives, conducting "unexpected visitations and inquisitions," observing people and places, and drafting and enforcing ordinances related to those ends.

== Death ==
Osse resigned from his judgeship in 1555 due to his increasingly poor health. He died the following year, at the age of 50.
