= Julius Bernhard von Rohr =

German cameralist and writer

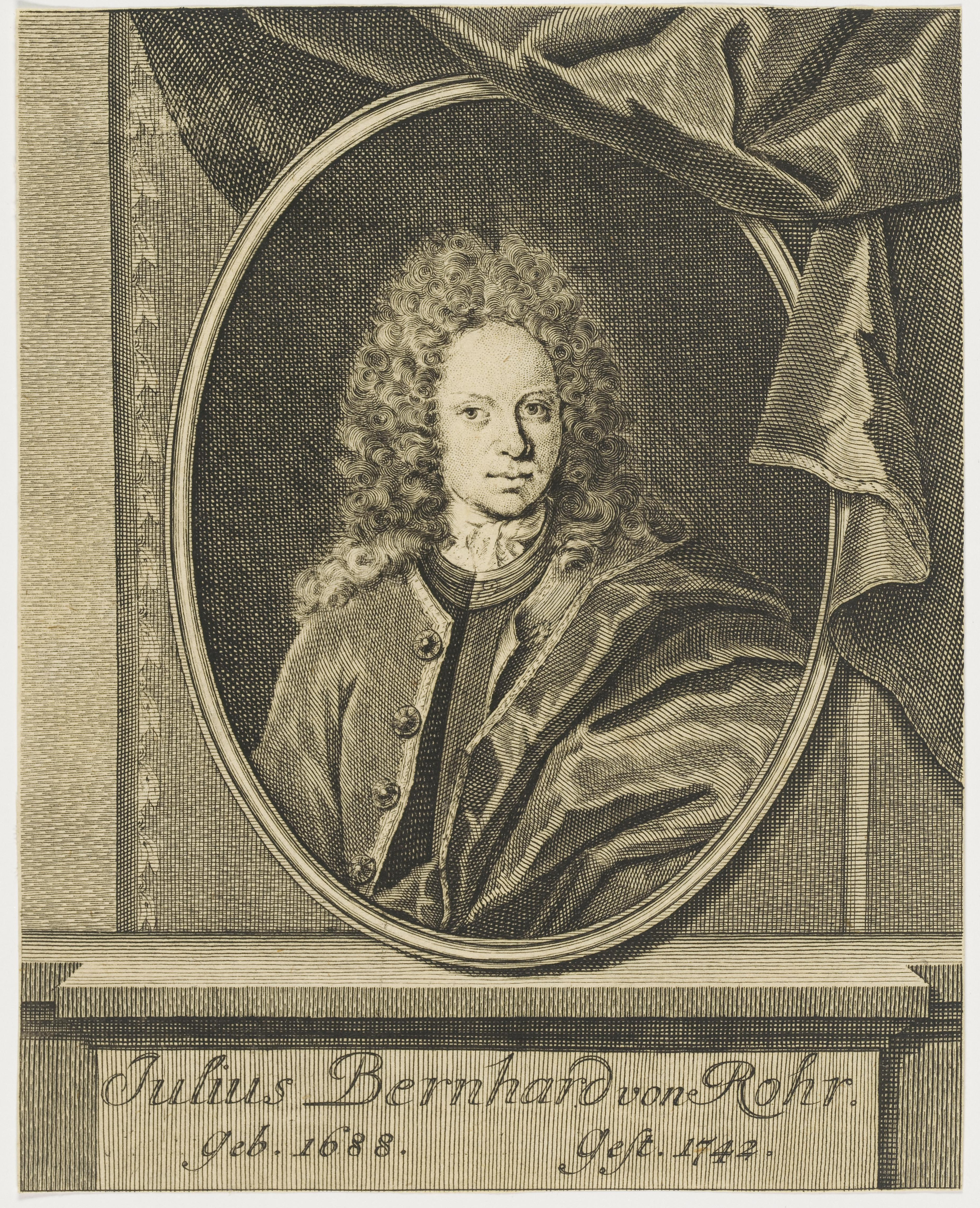

Julius Bernhard von Rohr (28 March 1688 – 18 April 1742) was a German cameralist and writer who promoted natural or physico-theology through an appreciation of plants. His most famous book was Phyto-theologia (1740) in which he examined plants as an expression of the wisdom of a creator. Apart from theological topics, he also wrote books on jurisprudence, farming and geography.

== Life and work ==
Von Rohr was born into nobility at Elsterwerda manor and castle in Saxony, the son of Julius Albert and Christine née von Pipe. He was privately tutored on the estate and then went to the University of Leipzig where he studied law according to his father's wishes but also attended classes in the natural sciences and economics. In 1710 he wrote a dissertation De retractu gentilitio filiorum in feudis and then travelled to Hamburg where he worked with his father on commercial quests. In 1711 he was sent to Frankfurt to represent his estate in the court. In 1712 he went back to the University of Leipzig and worked on Dissertatio de excolendo studio oeconomico tam principum quam privatorum followed by De jure principum circa augendas et conservandas subditorum opes. His father's estate was sold and decided not to inherit from the sales. When his father died, he lived with his mother before seeking a job. He went to Halle where he studied mathematics from Christian Wolff and wrote The Nature and Benefits of Mathematical Science in 1713 before moving to Holland briefly. In 1714 he became an assessor in the Magdeburg Monastery and in 1717 he was voted extraordinarium there. In 1726 he moved to Lower Lusatia and worked on judicial and cameral issues. He then worked in Merseburg until his retirement in 1738. He bought an estate near Meissen where he managed a vineyard and farmland.

Von Rohr's work on phyto-theology of 1740 followed a tradition set by Boyle, Scheuchzer, Wolff, Derham, and others. In his book he maintained that God had made plants for use by humans and that God provided different plant resources in different parts of the world. He was also a prolific writer who published 29 works and was working on 9 others. He was also involved in introducing cameral education in the universities.

Von Rohr lived with a woman around 1724-39 but ran into troubles which he wrote about in a legal treatise. In 1739 he married a commoner.
