= Melchior Feselen =

German painter

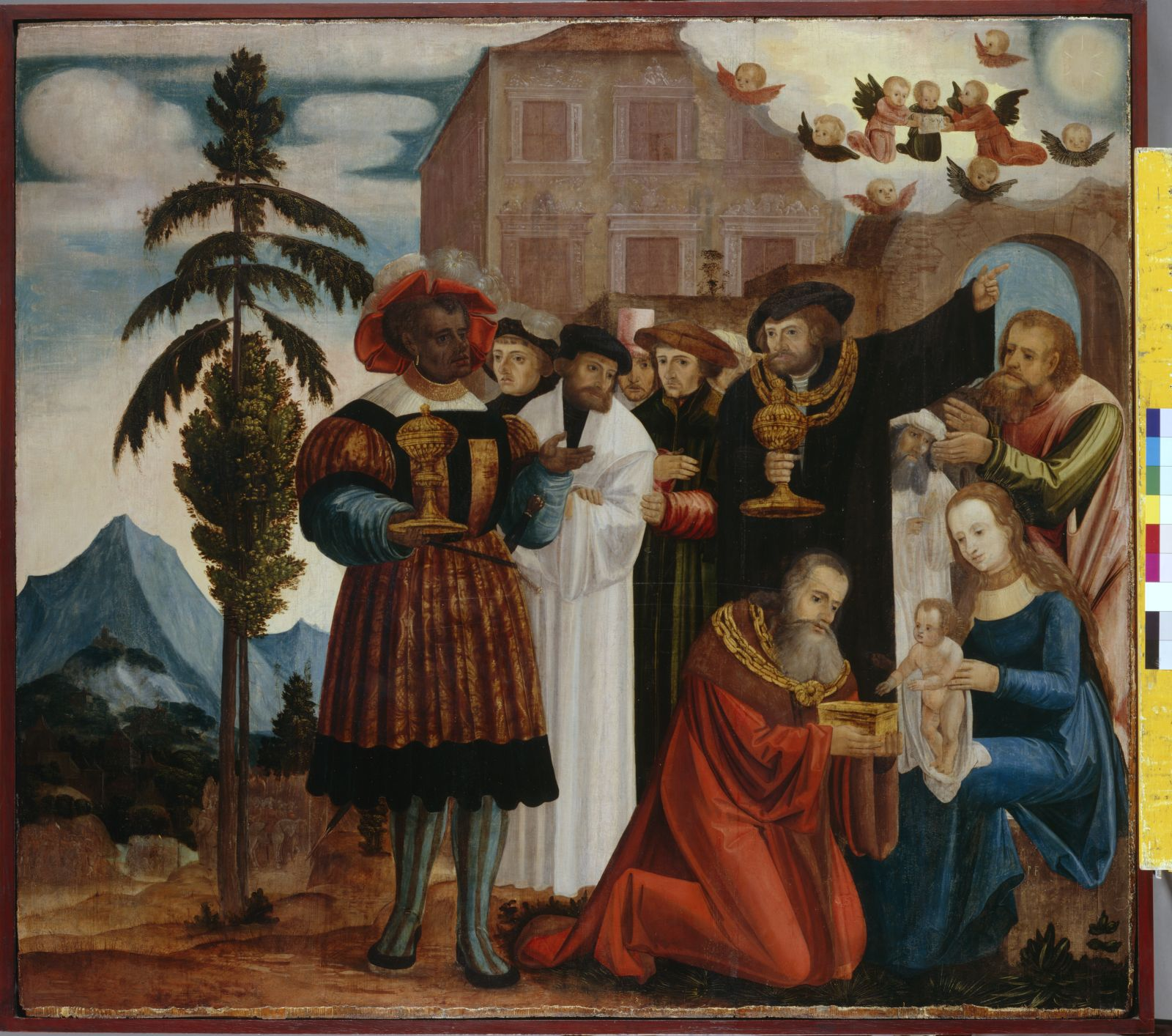
Adoration of the Magi, 1522, now in the Germanisches Nationalmuseum

Melchior Feselen, an historical painter, of Passau, lived at the same time as Altdorfer, whose works he imitated with assiduity. Though he was inferior to that artist, his paintings are rich in composition, with a great number of figures highly finished, and in a style quite peculiar to himself. He died at Ingolstadt in 1538. Among his paintings are:

- The Crucifixion, Darmstadt State Museum.
- The Siege of Rome by Porsena, 1529, and Caesar conquering the town Alesia in Gaul, 1533, Munich, Alte Pinakothek.
- The Adoration of the Magi, 1531, Nuremberg. Museum.
- St. Mary of Egypt, Ratisbon. Hist. Soc.

== See also ==
- List of German painters
