= Eberhard Melchior (naturalist) =

German writer and naturalist

Eberhard Melchior was a writer who published a few works about German thermal spas around 1700.

== Publications ==
- (1694) Hydrologia Brevis quidem, attamen fundamentalis [...] Das ist: Ein kurtzes doh gründliches Wasser-Gespräch/ Welches Neptunus mit seiner betrübten Schwalbacher Wasser-Göttin, der Hodorrille, in beyseyn eines Medici und Philosophi gehalten [...] von dem Wasser selbsten [...] von aller Bäder Ursprung [...] von dem Schlangen-Bad und dessen Kräfften [...]. Frankfurt am Mainz.
- (1694–1697) Anatomia hydrologica thermarum Wisbadensium [...] das ist, Aussführlicher, genauer ursprünglicher Bericht und Cuhr-Buch, von Krafft und Würckung der Welt-bekandten und von Gott gesegneten heylsamen Bäder zu Wissbaden.
- (1702) Mars acidulis Swalbacensibus restitutus. Frankfurt am Mainz.
- (1739) Kurtzer doch gründlicher Bericht vom Sauer-Wasser im Langen-Schwalbach, wie dasselbe zu Erhaltung der Gesundheit [...] zu trincken. Auch wie von dem Brodel-Brunnen allein, oder mit dem Schlangen-Bad vermischt, nützliche Bad-Cur zu halten.
