= Melchior Hittorp =

German theologian

Melchior Hittorp (born about 1525, at Cologne; died there in 1584) was a German Roman Catholic theologian and liturgical writer. His interests included the liturgical forms of early Christianity.

== Life ==
On the completion of his studies he obtained the degree of Licentiate of Theology, and was appointed Canon at S. Maria ad Gradus. In 1593 he was elected dean of the collegiate church of St. Cunibert.

== Works ==
At the request of Jacob Pamelius, then canon of Bruges and later Bishop of St-Omer, Hittorp published in 1568 "Vetustorum ecclesiæ patrum libri varii de divinis catholicæ ecclesiæ officiis", a work containing various liturgical writings of Isidore of Seville, Alcuin, Rhabanus Maurus, Strabo, Berno, and others. An enlarged edition by Ferrari (1591) was reproduced in the "Magn. Bibl, vet. PP.", X (Paris, 1644).
