= José Melchor =

Mexican footballer (born 1990)

Personal information
- Full name: José Alejandro Melchor Negrete
- Date of birth: 26 February 1990 (age 36)
- Place of birth: Culiacán, Sinaloa, Mexico
- Height: 1.73 m (5 ft 8 in)
- Position: Midfielder

Senior career*
Years	Team	Apps	(Gls)
–2017	Murciélagos		
- * Club domestic league appearances and goals

José Alejandro Melchor Negrete (born 26 February 1990) is a Mexican former professional footballer who played for Murciélagos of Ascenso MX. As of March 2020 he held the record the most appearances in Murciélagos’ history, with 250 appearances. He joined the club for a trial in 2008 and won the 2012 Apertura of the Liga Premier de Ascenso.
