= Melchior de la Mars =

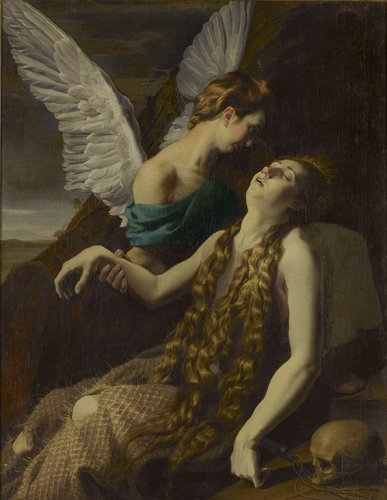
Maria Magdalen in ecstasy

Melchior de la Mars (c. 1585 – 1650) was a Flemish Baroque painter active in Ghent. Only recently rediscovered, the artist is considered an early representative of the so-called Ghent Caravaggisti.

== Life ==
Little is known about the life and training of the artist. His activity in Ghent is recorded in 1621, when he signed and dated the Circumcision of the infant Christ made for the altar of the church of Augustine Church (now Saint Stephanus Church) in Ghent. A year later he signed the Maria Magdalen in ecstasy (Royal Museums of Fine Arts of Belgium).

The artist was registered in the Guild of Saint Luke until 1622 after which there is no further record of the artist in the guild records. It is believed that the artist was also an art dealer and was thus able to export his own works, which explains their presence in French collections.

== Work ==
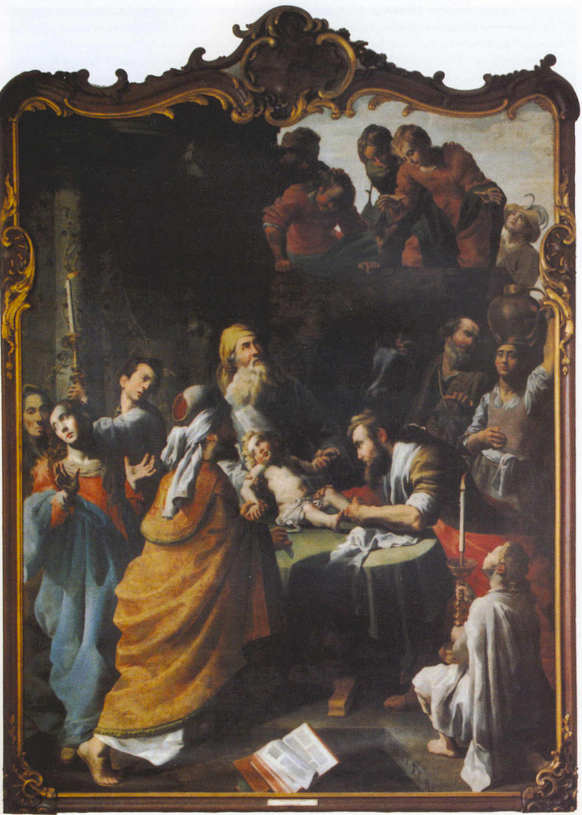
The circumcision of the infant Christ

Only two known signed works by the artist are known. It is on the basis of these works that a number of works formerly attributed to Northern and Italian Caravaggisti have been assigned to de la Mars.

The style of de la Mars' works, which combines chiaroscuro together with the Mannerist profiles of the figures, qualify the artist as an early representative of the Ghent Caravaggisti, who preceded the return of Jan Janssens from Rome in 1621. He was thus part of the earliest generation of Flemish Caravaggisti, which included, amongst others, Gerard Seghers and Theodoor van Loon.
