= Melchior Sebisch the Younger =

Silesian physician (1578–1674)

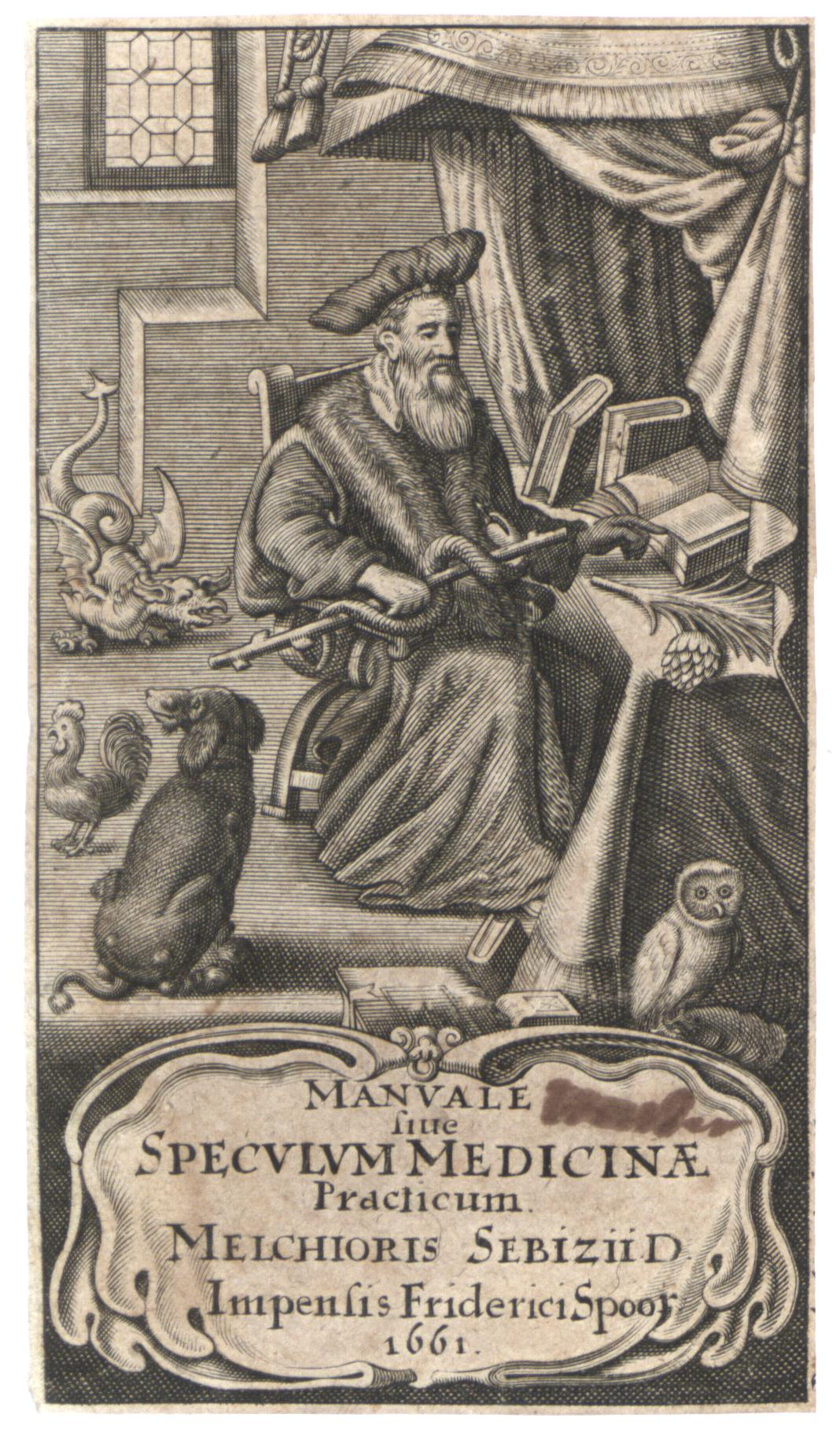

Melchior Sebisch the Younger also spelt Sebitz, Latinized as Sebizius (19 July 1578 – 25 January 1674) was a physician and professor of medicine at the University of Strasbourg. He was the son of Melchior Sebisch the Elder.

== Life and work ==
Sebisch was born in Strasbourg, son of the professor of medicine Melchior Sebisch. He travelled across Europe studying at nearly 27 universities including Strasbourg, Tubingen, Vienna and Prague before receiving a doctorate from Basel in 1610. In 1612 he worked as an assistant to his father in Strasbourg. In 1613 he married Dorothea Stoeffel, widow of Niclaus Hugo Kniebs and they had four children. He became a city physician in 1625 and in 1630 he was created Count Palatine of the Empire as well as dean and rector of the University of Strasbourg. He supervised the dissertations of several students and some of these were published in Disputatio de Dentibus (1644) which includes the dissertations of Zacharia Andreas from Colmar, Claus Sigismund from Breslau, Conrad Schluser, from Reichenbergen-Hesse and Iacob Bechter from Strasbourg. Much of his teaching was old-fashioned and uncritically based on the writings of Galen. In one of his theses he explained the apoplectic of a man as being caused by a snake in his stomach.
