= Melchior Sebisch the Elder =

Silesian physician and entomologist (1539–1625)

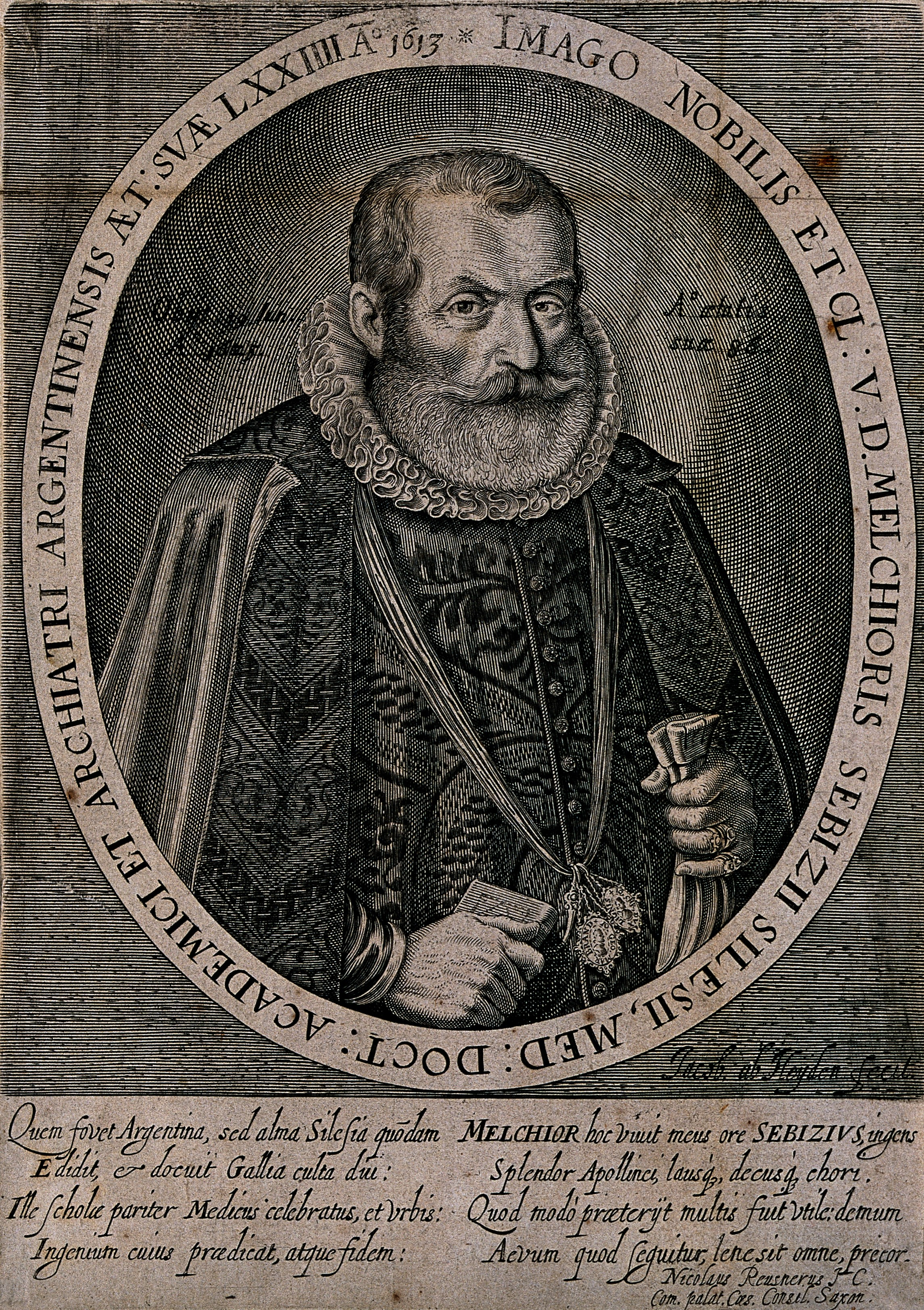

Melchior Sebisch the Elder (also spelt Sebitz and Latinized as Sebizius) (1539 – 19 June 1625) was a Silesian physician and naturalist. He worked as a professor of medicine at the University of Strasbourg. His only major written work was an edition of the herbals of Tragus published in 1577 with his commentaries. His son Melchior Sebisch II (1578-1674) studied across Europe and also became a professor of medicine at Strasbourg.

Sebisch was born in Falkenberg to Girzik Zawissa, alias Georg von Sabisch, co-lord of Radischowitz who joined the Protestant Reformation, and Catharina Oczeck (Ocitz) von Ebersdorf. He studied philosophy at Leipzig, law at Strasbourg, and medicine in Germany, France and Italy, receiving a medical degree at Valencia in 1571. He became a city physician in Hagenau and moved to Strasbourg in 1574 where he became a professor and later honorary rector. He corresponded with Johann and Kaspar Bauhin. His son Melchior Sebisch II (July 19, 1578-1674) studied in numerous universities across Europe before receiving his doctorate in 1610 at Basel. He then worked as an assistant to his father at the University of Strasbourg before becoming a professor of medicine in 1612. He taught the teachings of Hippocrates. Sebisch II promoted the ideas of Galen and wrote another edition of Hieronymus Bock or Tragus' herbals in 1630 and translated the French work of Étienne and Jean Libault.
