= 1639 in Belgium =

- Decades: 1630s; 1650s
- See also: Other events of 1639; List of years in Belgium

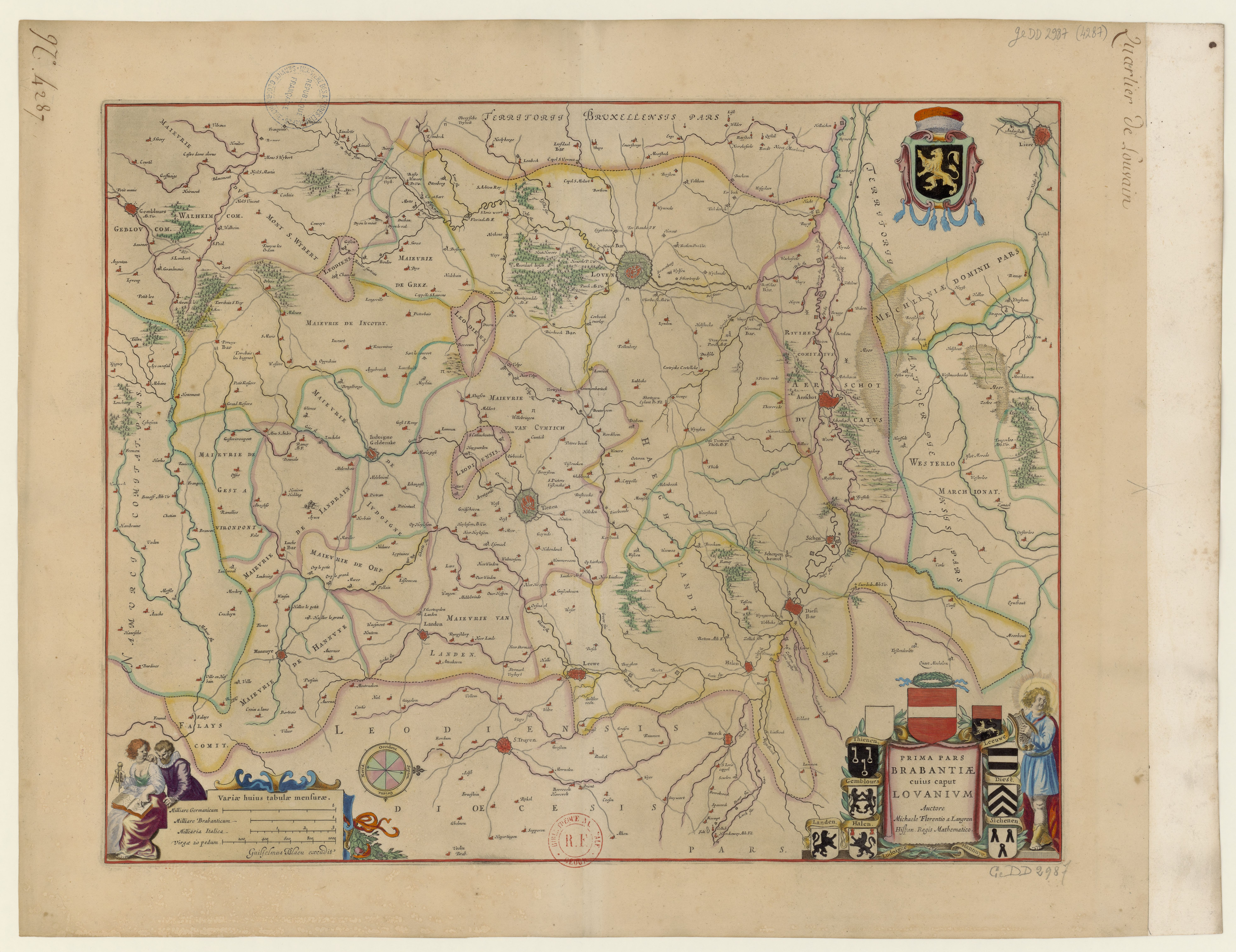
Michael Florent van Langren, Map of Brabant in the quarter of Leuven (1639)

Events in the year 1639 in the Spanish Netherlands and Prince-bishopric of Liège (predecessor states of modern Belgium).

== Incumbents ==
=== Habsburg Netherlands ===
Monarch – Philip IV, King of Spain and Duke of Brabant, of Luxembourg, etc.

Governor General – Cardinal-Infante Ferdinand of Austria

=== Prince-Bishopric of Liège ===
Prince-Bishop – Ferdinand of Bavaria

== Events ==
- 18 February – Action of 18 February 1639 off Dunkirk
- 20 May – Regulations for the management of the goods and income of the city of Brussels published
- 7 June – Relief of Thionville
- 15 July – Great Council of Mechelen declares Louis of Egmont guilty of treason
- 16-17 September – Fight in the Channel
- 3 October – Liège militiamen storm Jehay Castle to preserve the neutrality of the Prince-Bishopric
- 21 October – Battle of the Downs

== Art and architecture ==
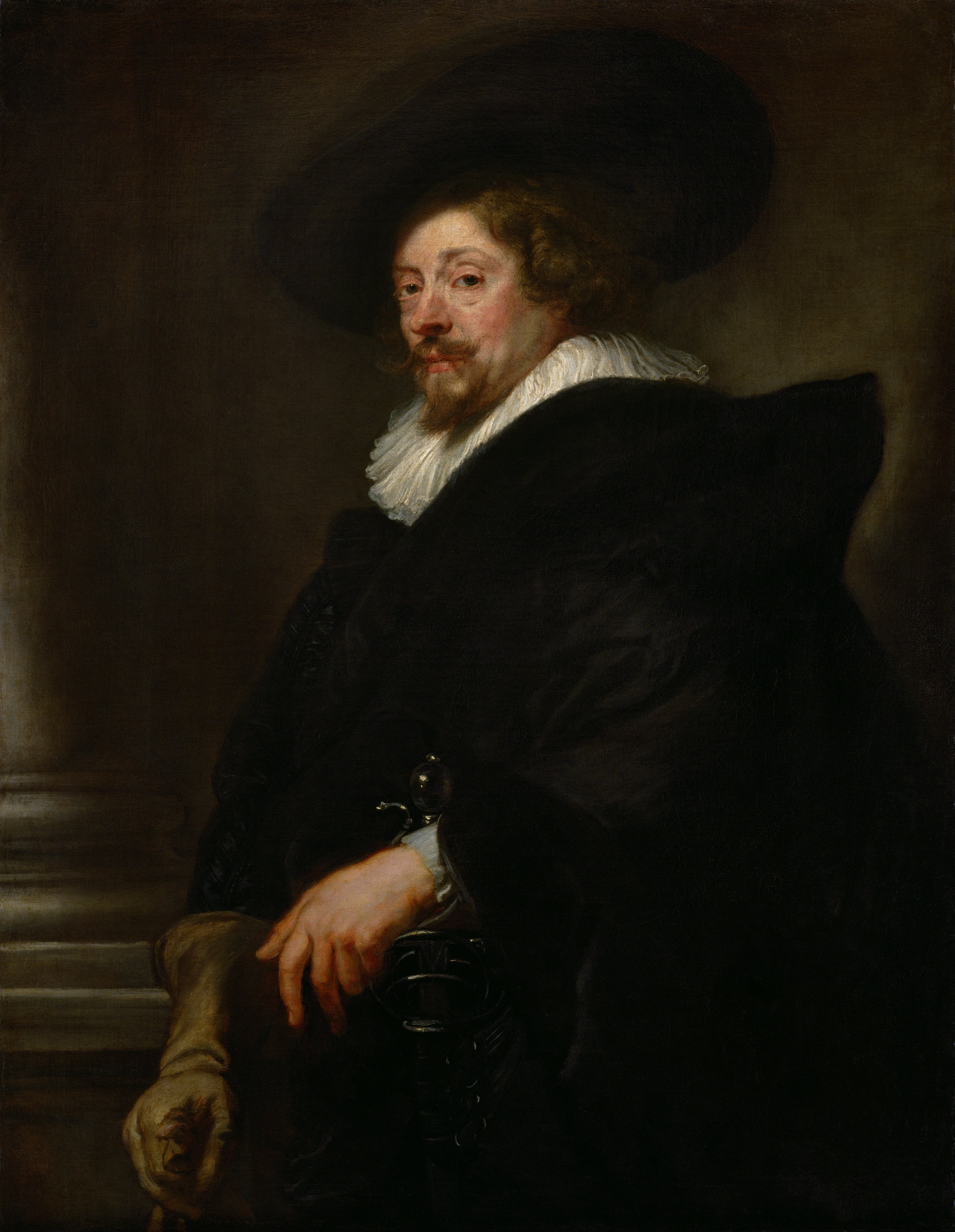
Rubens Self-Portrait

- Peter Paul Rubens, Self-Portrait

== Publications ==
- Augustinian College, Antwerp, Arsaces Armeniae rex (printed anonymously) — a school play put on in January 1639
- Augustinian College, Ghent, Exilium Tarquinii regis Romani, et mirandam Lucretiae fidelitatem (Ghent, widow of Judocus Dooms) — a school play
- Laurentius van Beneden, Het Leven ende deuchden van Sint Jan Evangelist (Brussels, Govaerdt Schoevaerdts)
- Boetius à Bolswert, Amstelredams eer ende opcomen, door de denckwaerdighe miraklen aldaer geschied, aen ende door het H. sacrament des altaers. Anno 1345 (Antwerp, Hendrik Aertssens)
- Willem vanden Bossche, Historia medica in qua libris IV, animalium natura, et eorum medica utilitas exacte et luculenter tractantur (Brussels, Jan Mommaert)
- Antoine de Bourgogne, Mundi lapis lydius (Antwerp, Widow of Joannes Cnobbaert)
- Philippe Brasseur, Diva Virgo Camberonensis (Mons, Jean Havart)
- Engelbert Des Bois, Decreta synodi dioecesanae Namurcensis, habitae in cappella episcopali, die septima junij, anni 1639 (Namur, Jean van Milst)
- Dorotheus of Gaza, De gheestelijcke leeringhe vanden H. abt Dorotheus uyt het landt van Palestynen, translated by Pauwels Knibbe (Kortrijk, widow of Jan van Ghemmert)
- Emmanuel Rodriguez de Gratia, Grammatica angelorum mysticorum sive Labyrinthus cryptographicus (Antwerp, Geeraerdt II van Wolsschaten)
- Cornelius Jansenius, Commentarius in sancta Jesu Christi Evangelia (Leuven, Jacob Zegers)
- Joannes Evangelista van 's-Hertogenbosch, Het ryck Godts inder zielen oft binnen u-lieden (Antwerp, Hendrik Aertssens)
- Ángel Manrique, La vie de la vénérable mère Anne de Jésus, disciple et compagne saincte Térèse de Jésus (Brussels, Govaerdt Schoevaerdts)
- Pierre Marchant, Af-beeldinghe des waerachtigh christen mensch, naer het voor-beelt vanden reghel der derder ordre van S. Franchois (Ghent, Alexander Sersanders)
- François de Montmorency, Pietas victrix (Antwerp, Plantin Press under Balthasar Moretus)
- Willem Ogier, De Gulsigheydt (anonymously printed)
- César Oudin, Grammaire espagnolle mise et expliquee en françois (Brussels, Jan Mommaert)
- César Oudin, Den grooten dictionaris en schat van talen, duytsch, spaensch en fransche, met de name der Kycken, Steden ende plaetsen der wereldt. El grande dictionario y thesoro de las tres lenguas española, francesa, flamenco, con todos los nombres de loe reynos, ciudades y lugares del mundo (Antwerp, Caesar Joachim Trognesius)
- Pierre Parisot, Linguae Gallicae institutiones ad usum iuventutis collegii Porcensis Lovanii (Leuven, Cornelis Coenesteyn)
- Erycius Puteanus, Auspicia bibliothecae publicae Lovaniensis (Leuven, Everardus de Witte)
- Erycius Puteanus, Pompa prosphonetica, sive Praefationum syntagma (Leuven, Everardus de Witte)
- Nicolaus Vernulaeus, De propagatione fidei christianae in Belgio per sanctos ex Hibernia viros liber (Leuven, Jacob Zegers)
- Jean de Wachtendonck, Het leven, 't lyden, ende mirakelen vanden H. Romboudt artsch-bisschop van Dublin, apostel ende martelaer van Mechelen, translated by Franchoys vanden Bossche (Mechelen, Henry Jaye)
- Johannes Wamesius, Responsorum sive consiliorum ad jus, forumque civile, pertinentium (Antwerp, Hendrik Aertssens)
- Olivier de Wree, Sigilla comitum Flandriae et inscriptiones diplomatum ab iis editorum (Bruges, Jan Baptist van den Kerchove)

Anonymous

- Een kort begrijp van den sprocket ende miraekelen van het heyligh ende glorieus beeldt van Onse Lieve Vrouwe tot Kersselaer een half myle buyten Audenaerde (Kortrijk, Jan van Ghemmert)
- Kort verhael van het mirakel ende martyrie van ... P. Franciscus Marcellus Mastrillus, van de Societeyt Jesu ... in de stadt Mangasaqui, in ... Japonien, den 17. Oct. M.DC.XXXVII. (Brussels, Jan Mommaert)
- Mars Gallicus seu De justitia armorum, et foederum regis Galliae

Newspapers

- Extraordinarisse Post-tijdinghe (Antwerp, Willem Verdussen)
- Nieuwe Tydinghen uyt verscheyde ghewesten (Bruges, Nicolaes Breyghel)
- Den Ordinarissen Postilioen (Antwerp, Martin Binnart)
- Le Postillon ordinaire (Antwerp, Martin Binnart)

== Births ==
Date uncertain

- Joannes van der Brugghen, artist (died c. 1740)
- Jacob van Oost the Younger, painter (died 1713)

== Deaths ==
- 3 March – Servaas de Quinckere (born 1569), bishop
- 29 March – Johannes Wiggers (born 1571), theologian
- 1 May – Dermot O'Mallun, 1st Baron Glean-O'Mallun
- 22 May – Karel Philips Spierincks (born c. 1600), painter
- 19 July – Jeanne de Cambry (born 1581), religious foundress

Date uncertain

- Gommaert van der Gracht (born c. 1590), painter
- Léonard de Hodémont (born 1575), organist
