= 1629 in Belgium =

- Decades: 1630s
- See also: Other events of 1629; List of years in Belgium

Events in the year 1629 in the Spanish Netherlands and Prince-bishopric of Liège (predecessor states of modern Belgium).

== Incumbents ==
=== Habsburg Netherlands ===
Monarch – Philip IV, King of Spain and Duke of Brabant, of Luxembourg, etc.

Governor General – Isabella Clara Eugenia, Infanta of Spain

=== Prince-Bishopric of Liège ===
Prince-Bishop – Ferdinand of Bavaria

== Events ==
- 30 April – Siege of 's-Hertogenbosch begins
- 14 September – Anthonie Schetz surrenders 's-Hertogenbosch to the Dutch
- 29 October – Public celebrations ordered for the birth (on 17 October) of Balthasar Charles

== Art and architecture ==
- Anthony van Dyck, The Vision of the Blessed Hermann Joseph

== Publications ==
- anonymous, De groote evangelische peerle vol devote ghebeden, goddelijke oeffeningen, ende gheestelijcke leeringhen (Antwerp, Joannes Cnobbaert)
- Coustumes et usages de la ville, taille, banlieue et eschevinage de Lille (Lille, Christophe Beys)
- Jan van Blitterswyck, Gheestelicke zuchten tot Godt (Bruges, Guilliame de Neve)
- Virgilio Cepari, Het leven van Ioannes Berchmans, translated by Jacobus Susius (Antwerp, Hendrik Aertssens)
- François-Hyacinthe Choquet, Recueil des vies et actions mémorables des saints personnages ayants vescu dans les Pays-Bas soubs la règle de S. Dominique (Douai, Balthazar Bellerus)
- J. A. Cools, Gheestelycke herders-dichten, behelsende Brusselsche bee-vaert. Bethlem. Scherpen-heuvel (Brussels, Jan Mommaert)
- Benedictus van Haeften, Schola cordis (Antwerp, Hieronymus Verdussen)
- Herman Hugo, Goddelycke wenschen verlicht met sinne-beelden, ghedichten en vierighe uyt-spraecken der oud-vaeders, translated by Justus de Harduwijn (Antwerp, Hendrik Aertssens)
- Jesuit Fathers, Kort begryp van het ghene dat gheschreven wordt door de patres van de societeyt Jesu, met brieven van den jaere MDCXXVII aengaende de koninckrijcken van Japonien (Antwerp, Hendrik Aertssens)
- Jean de Marnix, Resolutions politiques et maximes d'Estat (Brussels, Jan van Meerbeeck)
- Jean Scohier, L'estat et comportement des armes (Brussels, Jan Mommaert)

== Births ==
- 22 January – Frans van Horenbeke, bishop of Ghent (died 1679)
- 1 March – Abraham Teniers, painter (died 1670)

== Deaths ==
- 23 January – Andreas Schott (born 1552), Jesuit writer
- 24 June – Carolus Scribani (born 1561), Jesuit writer
- 11 September – Herman Hugo (born 1588), Jesuit writer
- 13 October – Petrus Bertius (born 1565), geographer
- 25 October – Adriaan Stalpaerts (born 1563) abbot of Tongerlo Abbey
