= 1634 in Belgium =

- Decades: 1630s; 1650s
- See also: Other events of 1634; List of years in Belgium

Events in the year 1634 in the Spanish Netherlands and Prince-bishopric of Liège (predecessor states of the nation of Belgium).

== Incumbents ==
=== Habsburg Netherlands ===
Monarch – Philip IV, King of Spain and Duke of Brabant, of Luxembourg, etc.

Governor General – Marquis of Aytona to 4 November; thereafter Cardinal-Infante Ferdinand of Austria

=== Prince-Bishopric of Liège ===
Prince-Bishop – Ferdinand of Bavaria

== Events ==
March

13 March – Great Council of Mechelen sentences Henry, Count of Bergh, in absentia to death and forfeiture of goods for his role in the Conspiracy of Nobles (1632).

April

- 15 April – Duke of Aarschot arrested in Madrid.
- 29 April – Marquis of Aytona decrees amnesty for 1632 conspirators.

May

- 23 May – Gaspard Nemius appointed bishop of Antwerp.

July

- 5 July – Estates General, in session since 7 September 1632, disbanded by order of Philip IV of Spain.

November

- 4 November – Joyous Entry into Brussels of Cardinal-Infante Ferdinand of Austria as new governor general.

== Publications ==
- François-Hyacinthe Choquet, Mariae Deiparae in ordinem praedicatorum viscera materna (Antwerp, Joannes Cnobbaert)
- Jean-Jacques Courvoisier, Le sacré mausolée ou Les parfums exhalants du tombeau de la Serenissime Princesse Isabelle-Claire-Eugénie (Brussels, François Vivien)
- Christophorus van Essen, Den waerom? Den Daerom. De exempelen ende waerheyt met eene voorstellinge ende beklach des oorloghs (Antwerp, Hendrik Aertssens), dedicated to Johannes Chrysostomus vander Sterre. The author is identified as "fencing master in Antwerp".
- Franciscus Piroulle, Oratio funebris in obitum augustae et felicis memoriae Isabellae Clarae Eugeniae Hispaniarum infantis, Belgarum principis, habita Brugis in aede D. Donatani XI. Januarii MDCXXXIV (Bruges, Nicolaes Breyghel)
- Jean Puget de la Serre, Mausolee erige a la memoire d'Isabelle-Claire-Eugenie (Brussels, Jean Pepermans)
- Erycius Puteanus, Historiae barbaricae libri VI, qui irruptiones barbarorum in Italiam, occasum Imperii, et res Insubrum continent (Antwerp, Joannes Cnobbaert)
- Juan Francisco Rodriguez, Nieuwen dictionaris om te leeren de Nederlandtsche ende Spaensche talen: met groote neerstigheydt by een vergadert ende ghestelt met de nomina, genera, verba ende eenighe coniugatien (Antwerp, Caesar Joachim Trognaesius) – A Dutch-Spanish dictionary and grammar.
- Nicolaus Vernulaeus, Laudatio funebris aeternae memoriae Isabellae Clarae Eugeniae (Leuven, Philippus van Dormael)
- Nicolaus Vernulaeus, Elogia oratoria (Leuven, Jacob Zegers)
- Jean de Wachtendonck, Oratio funebris Isabellae Clarae Eugeniae Hispaniarum infantis (Brussels, Jean Pepermans).

== Works of art ==
- Anthony van Dyck
  - Magistrates of Brussels (destroyed 1695)
  - Deposition (Alte Pinakothek)

== Births ==
- 27 February – Peter van de Velde, painter (died after 1723)
- 9 May – Lievin Cruyl, priest-architect (died before 1720)

Date uncertain

- Jan-Erasmus Quellinus, painter (died 1715)
- Pieter van der Willigen, painter (died 1694)

== Deaths ==
- 6 February – Floris Van der Haer (born 1547), historian
- 6 March – Jean Zuallart (born 1541), pilgrim
- 9 August – Pieter de Jode (born 1570), printmaker
- 23 November – Wenceslas Cobergher (born 1560), architect and economist
- 19 December – George Chamberlain (born 1576), bishop of Ypres

Date uncertain

- John Heigham (born c. 1568), printer
- Philippe de Momper (born 1598), painter
