= 1631 in Belgium =

- Decades: 1630s; 1650s
- See also: Other events of 1631; List of years in Belgium

Events in the year 1631 in the Spanish Netherlands and Prince-bishopric of Liège (predecessor states of modern Belgium).

== Incumbents ==
=== Habsburg Netherlands ===
Monarch – Philip IV, King of Spain and Duke of Brabant, of Luxembourg, etc.

Governor General – Isabella Clara Eugenia, Infanta of Spain

=== Prince-Bishopric of Liège ===
Prince-Bishop – Ferdinand of Bavaria

== Events ==
- Membership of the Walloon Province (Provincia Gallo-Belgica) of the Society of Jesus peaks at 856.
- 5 February – Export of saltpetre and gunpowder prohibited by royal order.
- 8 February – Council of Flanders reissues a 1605 clarification of their 1601 proclamation on the production and sale of brandywine, prohibiting innkeepers and tavernkeepers from distilling brandywine, and brandywine distillers from selling retail except to medical professionals.
- 22 March – Detailed proclamation on hunting in the County of Flanders issued in Brussels.
- 1 to 4 June – Frederick Henry, Prince of Orange, launches an abortive invasion of the County of Flanders from IJzendijke, probing the defences of Bruges.
- 19 July – Marie de' Medici flees from Compiègne to the Low Countries.
- 29 July – Marie de' Medici takes up residence in Mons.
- 5 August – Decree on foreign and billon coinage issued.
- 11 August – Archduchess Isabella Clara Eugenia arrives in Mons to welcome Marie de' Medici.
- 26 November – Antwerp city council issues by-laws against price-gouging in the transportation of firewood.

== Publications ==
- Antonio Álvares Suares, Elogio funebre en cancion real a la vida i hazañas muerte i obsequias del señor Ambrosio Spinola, marques de los Balbases, cavallero de la orden del tuson de oro (Antwerp, Plantin Press)
- Philippe Chifflet, Histoire du prieuré nostre Dame de Bellefontaine au comté de Bourgongne (Antwerp, Plantin Press)
- Libertus Fromondus, Labyrinthus sive de compositione continui liber unus: philosophis, mathematicis, theologis utilis ac iucundus (Antwerp, Plantin Press)
- Emmanuel Rodriguez de Gratia, Rodericus fatalis tragoedia (Leuven, Cornelis Coenesteyn)
- Pierre Marchant, Expositio litteralis in Regulam S. Francisci (Antwerp, Willem Lesteens).
- Jean Puget de la Serre, Le Bréviaire des courtisans (Brussels, François Vivien)
- Erycius Puteanus, Diva virgo Bellifontana in Sequanis (Antwerp, Plantin Press)
- Urban VIII, Onsen alderheyligsten vaders ende heeren Urbani des VIII. paus, suppressie van de vermeynde vergaderinghe der Jesuiterssen (Brussels, Jan Mommaert the Younger)
- Geeraerd vanden Brande, Brandt in Liefde: Poemata ofte Gedichten (Antwerp, Geeraerdt van Wolsschaten the Younger)
- Nicolaus Vernulaeus, Les trophées d'Ambroise de Spinola, celebrez par 6 orateurs, Flamen, Frison, Imperial, Brabanceau, Espagnol, et Italien (Leuven, Jacobus Zegers)
- Nicolaus Vernulaeus, Tragoediae decem (Leuven, Joannes Oliverius and Cornelius Coenesteyn)
- Johannes Wiggers, In tertiam partem D. Thomae Aquinatis commentaria (Leuven, Joannes Oliverius and Cornelis Coenesteyn)

== Births ==
- Date uncertain – Nikolaus van Hoy, artist (died 1679)
- 8 March – Jacques Neutre, abbot (died 1679)
- 8 April (baptism) – Cornelis de Heem, painter (died 1695)
- 22 June – Francis Rombouts, mayor of New York City (died 1691)
- 28 November (baptism) – Abraham Brueghel, painter (died c. 1690)
- 10 December – Jean Baptiste de Champaigne, painter (died 1681)

== Deaths ==
- Date uncertain
  - Charles, Duke of Aumale (born 1555), military commander
  - Tobias Verhaecht (born 1561), painter
- 11 January – Franciscus Haraeus (born 1555?), clergyman and cartographer
- August – Countess Charlotte Brabantina of Nassau (born 1580), noblewoman
- 11 October – Marten Ryckaert (born 1587), painter
- 18 October – Servais de Lairuelz (born 1560), monastic reformer
