= 1628 in Belgium =

- Decades: 1630s
- See also: Other events of 1628; List of years in Belgium

Events in the year 1628 in the Spanish Netherlands and Prince-bishopric of Liège (predecessor states of modern Belgium).

== Incumbents ==
=== Habsburg Netherlands ===
Monarch – Philip IV, King of Spain and Duke of Brabant, of Luxembourg, etc.

Governor General – Isabella Clara Eugenia, Infanta of Spain

=== Prince-Bishopric of Liège ===
Prince-Bishop – Ferdinand of Bavaria

== Events ==
- 3 January – Ambrogio Spinola summoned to Spain.
- 10 June – Brussels government issues directives for the maintenance of roads, ditches and bridges.
- 18 June – Albert de Ligne, Prince of Barbançon, invested as a Knight of the Golden Fleece.
- 10 July – Royal proclamation on the licensing of taverns and hostelries in the Duchy of Brabant, and the prosecution of crimes of violence taking place in them.
- 27 July – City of Antwerp orders public thanksgiving for deliverance from plague
- 31 July – Royal proclamation regulating the size and weight of butter tubs in the County of Flanders
- 3 November – Royal proclamation prohibiting markets and fairs on Sundays and holy days in the Duchy of Luxembourg
- 22 December – City of Antwerp updates regulations on food inspection to prevent the sale of bad herring.

== Art and architecture ==
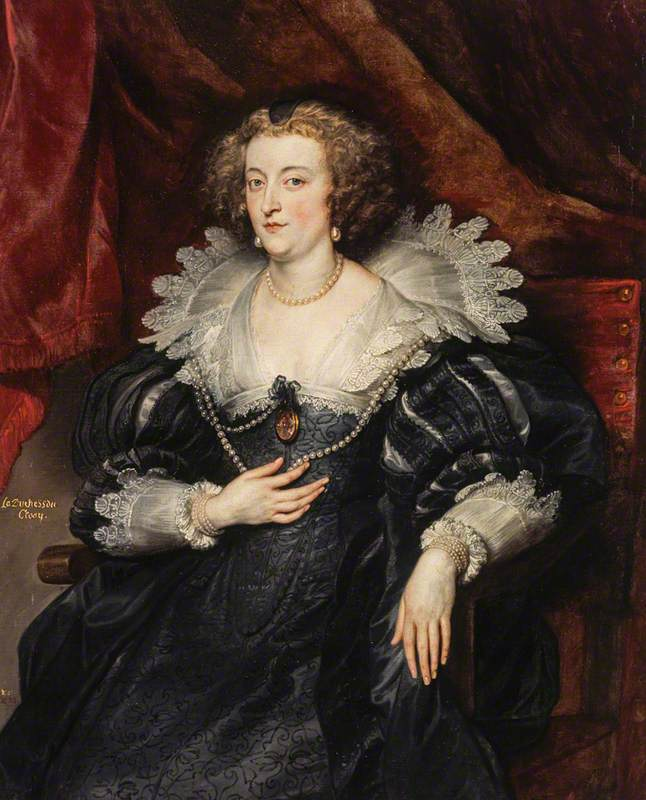
After Anthony van Dyck, Portrait of Geneviève d'Urfé, Duchess of Croÿ, c. 1628 (National Galleries Scotland)

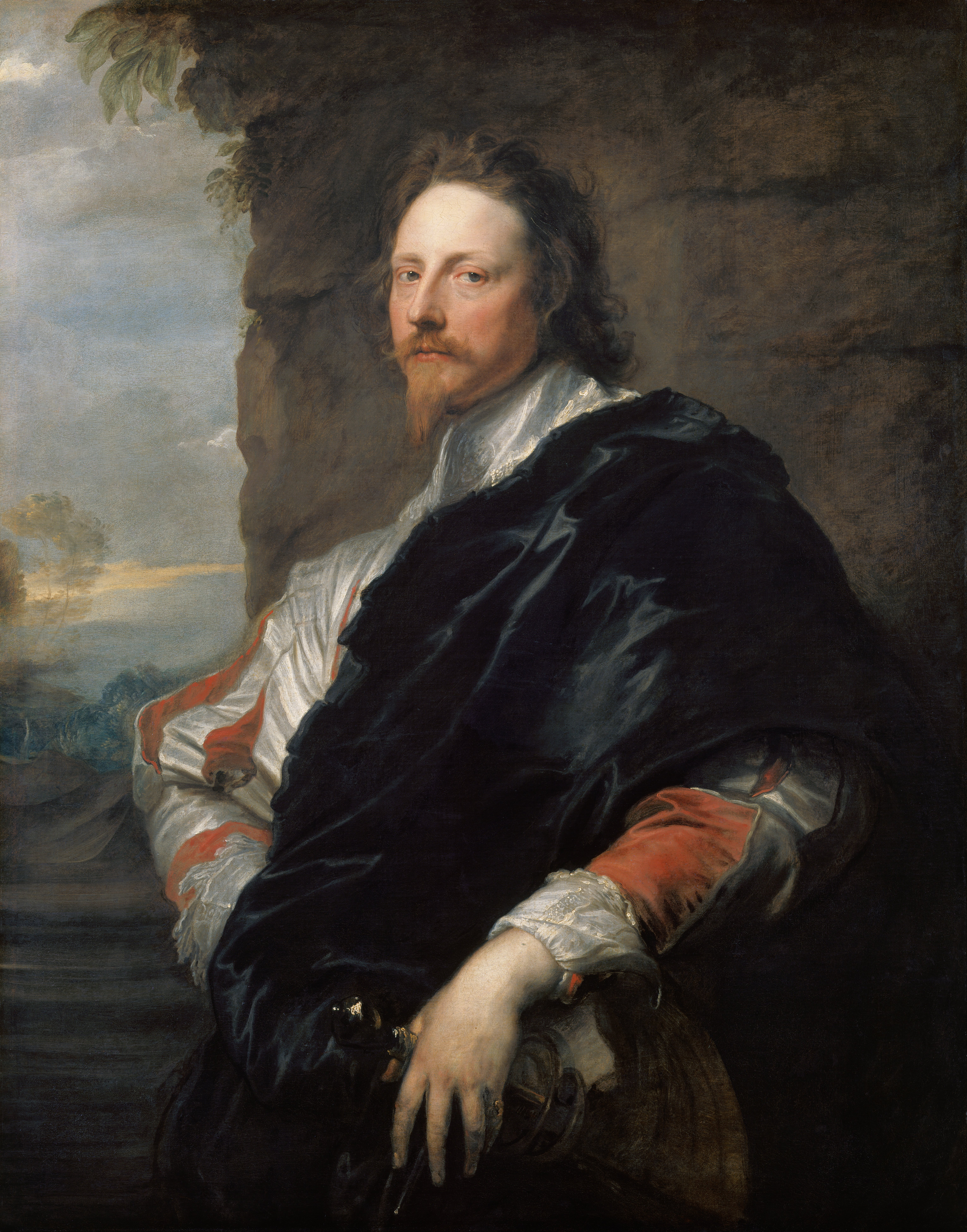
Anthony van Dyck, Portrait of Nicolas Lanier (1628)

- [after Anthony van Dyck], Portrait of Geneviève d'Urfé, Duchess of Croÿ (c. 1628)
- Anthony van Dyck, Portrait of Nicolas Lanier

== Publications ==
- Abbrégé des vies, martyres et miracles des vingt-six premiers martyrs au royaume du Jappon (Liège, Christian II Ouwerx)
- Christophe de Bonours, Le memorable siege d'Ostende (Brussels, Jan van Meerbeeck)
- Anselmus de Boodt, De baene des hemels ende der deughden (Bruges, Nicolaes Breyghel)
- Jean Boucher, L'Usure ensevelie ou defence des Monts de Piété de nouveau erigez aux Pais bas pour exterminer l'usure (Tournai, Adrien Quinqué)
- Joannes Busaeus, Den schadt der meditatien op allen de Evangelien vande Sondaghen ende Heylighe-daghen vanden gheheelen Jaere, translated by Cornelius Thielmans (Antwerp, Willem Lesteens)
- Claude Chifflet, De numismate antiquo liber posthumus (Leuven, Cornelis Coenesteyn)
- Zeger van Hontsum, Declaratio veridica, quod Begginae nomen (Antwerp, Hieronymus Verdussen)
- Aubertus Miraeus, Diplomatum Belgicorum libri duo, (Brussels, Jan Pepermans
- Pierre Parisot, Linguae Gallicae Institutiones (Leuven, Jean Olivier)
- Franciscus Sweertius, Athenae Belgicae (Antwerp, Willem van Tongeren)
- Simon Verepaeus, Een hantboecxken van seer schoone catholijcke ghebeden (Antwerp, Willem Lesteens)
- Richard Verstegan, Oorloge ghevochten met die wapenen van die waerheydt en van die reden (Antwerp, Joannes Cnobbaert)

Periodicals

- Nieuwe Tijdinghen (Antwerp, Abraham Verhoeven), ongoing

== Deaths ==
- 12-13 March – John Bull (born 1562/63), composer
- 12 July – Jean Curtius (born 1551), industrialist
- 12 November – Mary Lovel (born 1564), aristocrat
