= 1635 in Belgium =

- Decades: 1630s; 1650s
- See also: Other events of 1635; List of years in Belgium

Events in the year 1635 in the Spanish Netherlands and Prince-bishopric of Liège (predecessor states of modern Belgium).

== Incumbents ==
=== Habsburg Netherlands ===
Monarch – Philip IV, King of Spain and Duke of Brabant, of Luxembourg, etc.

Governor General – Cardinal-Infante Ferdinand of Austria

=== Prince-Bishopric of Liège ===
Prince-Bishop – Ferdinand of Bavaria

== Events ==
January

- 28 January – Joyous entry into Ghent of Cardinal-Infante Ferdinand of Austria as new governor general, Gaspar de Crayer playing a key role in the monumental decorations.

February

- Panel of experts at University of Louvain decrees that tobacco has no nutritional value.
- 8 February – French-Dutch treaty to partition the Spanish Netherlands, preliminary to the Franco-Spanish War (1635–59).

March

- 26 March – Ferdinand seizes Trier and has Archbishop-Elector Philipp Christoph von Sötern imprisoned.

April

- 11 April – Formal representations from Balthazar Gerbier, English resident in Brussels, about Dunkirkers interfering with English shipping.
- 17 April – Joyous entry into Antwerp of Cardinal-Infante Ferdinand of Austria as new governor general, Gaspar Gevartius co-ordinating the reception and Peter Paul Rubens playing a key role in the monumental decorations.

May

- 2 May – Great Council of Mechelen condemns Guillaume de Melun, Prince of Espinoy, in absentia as a traitor for his role in the Conspiracy of Nobles (1632).
- 20 May – Battle of Les Avins: French forces defeat a detachment of the Army of Flanders commanded by Thomas of Savoy, sent to prevent them linking up with the Dutch.

June

- 2 June – French-Dutch manifesto calls on inhabitants of the Spanish Netherlands to rise against their government.
- 8 June – Sack of Tienen by combined French-Dutch forces.
- 21 June – French-Dutch army crosses the Dijle near Overijse.
- 24 June – Siege of Leuven commences.

July

- 4 July – Siege of Leuven raised.
- 22 July – Gaspard Nemius consecrated bishop of Antwerp in Antwerp Cathedral.
- 28 July – Army of Flanders takes Schenkenschans.

== Publications ==
- Augustine of Hippo, De boecken der belydenissen (Antwerp, Joannes Cnobbaert)
- Diego de Aedo y Gallart, El memorable y glorioso viaje del infante Cardenal D. Fernándo de Avstria (Antwerp, Joannes Cnobbaert)
    - French translation as Le voyage du prince Don Fernande frère du Roy Philippe IV (Antwerp, Joannes Cnobbaert)
- Robert Bellarmine, An ample Declaration of the Christian Doctrine, translated by R. H. (Mechelen, Henry Jaye).
- Cornelius Jansen, Mars Gallicus ([Leuven, Jacobus Zegers]). On Google Books
- Pierre Marchant, Constitutions des religieuses réformées pénitentes du Tierce Ordre de S. François, de la Congrégation de Limbourg (Ghent, Jan Vanden Kerchove).
- Famiano Strada, De Bello Belgico (Antwerp, Joannes Cnobbaert)
- Nicolaus Vernulaeus, Orationum sacrarum volumen: in festa deiparae virginis & aliquorum divorum (Leuven, Franciscus Simonis)
- Nicolaus Vernulaeus, Triumphus Lovaniensium ob solutam urbis suae obsidionem per recessum duorum exercituum christianissimi Franciae regis, & foederatorum Belgii ordinum (Leuven, Philippus van Dormael and Jacob Zegers)
- Nicolaus Vernulaeus, Apologia pro augustissima, serenissima, et potentissima gente Austriaca (Leuven, Franciscus Simonis and Jacob Zegers)
- Nicolaus Vernulaeus, Dissertatio oratoria de causa belli Germanici (Leuven, Philippus van Dormael)
- Nicolaus Vernulaeus, Institutionum politicarum libri IV (Leuven, Franciscus Simonis)
- Michiel Zachmoorter, Thalamus sponsi, bruydegom's beddeken: het tweede deel (Antwerp, Joannes Cnobbaert)

Pamphlets

- Discours sur la rencontre du temps et des affaires presente par un vieulx cavalier francois a monseigneur le duc Dorleans (Brussels, Jean Pepermans). Available on Google Books
- Lettre de sa Majesté Imperiale a son agent a Rome, contenant les raisons pour lesquelles il a faict la paix avec le Duc de Saxe M. DC. XXXV (Brussels, Jean Pepermans).

== Works of art ==
- Peter Paul Rubens
  - The Dance of the Villagers, now in the Prado Museum, Madrid
  - The Village Fête, now in the Louvre Museum, Paris
  - Helena Fourment with Her Son Frans, now in the Alte Pinakothek, Munich
  - The Feast of Venus, now in the Kunsthistorisches Museum, Vienna

== Births ==
Date uncertain

- Francis van Bossuit, sculptor (died 1692)
- Daniel Danielis, composer (died 1696)
- Joannes Florentius a Kempis, composer (died after 1711)
- Joseph Roettiers, medallist (died 1703)

January

- 10 January – Alexander Farnese, Prince of Parma, Governor of the Habsburg Netherlands 1678–1682 (died 1689)

March

- 10 March – Jan van Buken, painter (died 1690)

August

- 30 August – Pieter Spierinckx, painter (died 1711)

== Deaths ==
Date uncertain

- Jean-Baptiste Gramaye (born 1579), historian
- Marquis of Aytona (born 1586), former acting governor-general of the Spanish Netherlands
- William Trumbull (born around 1575), former English ambassador to Brussels

February

- 5 February – Joos de Momper (born 1564), painter

October

- on or shortly after 24 October – Willem van Nieulandt II (born 1584), painter and poet

November

- 11 November – Paul Boudot (born 1571), bishop

December

- 2 December – Godfried Vereycken (born 1558), physician
