= 1638 in Belgium =

- Decades: 1630s; 1650s
- See also: Other events of 1638; List of years in Belgium

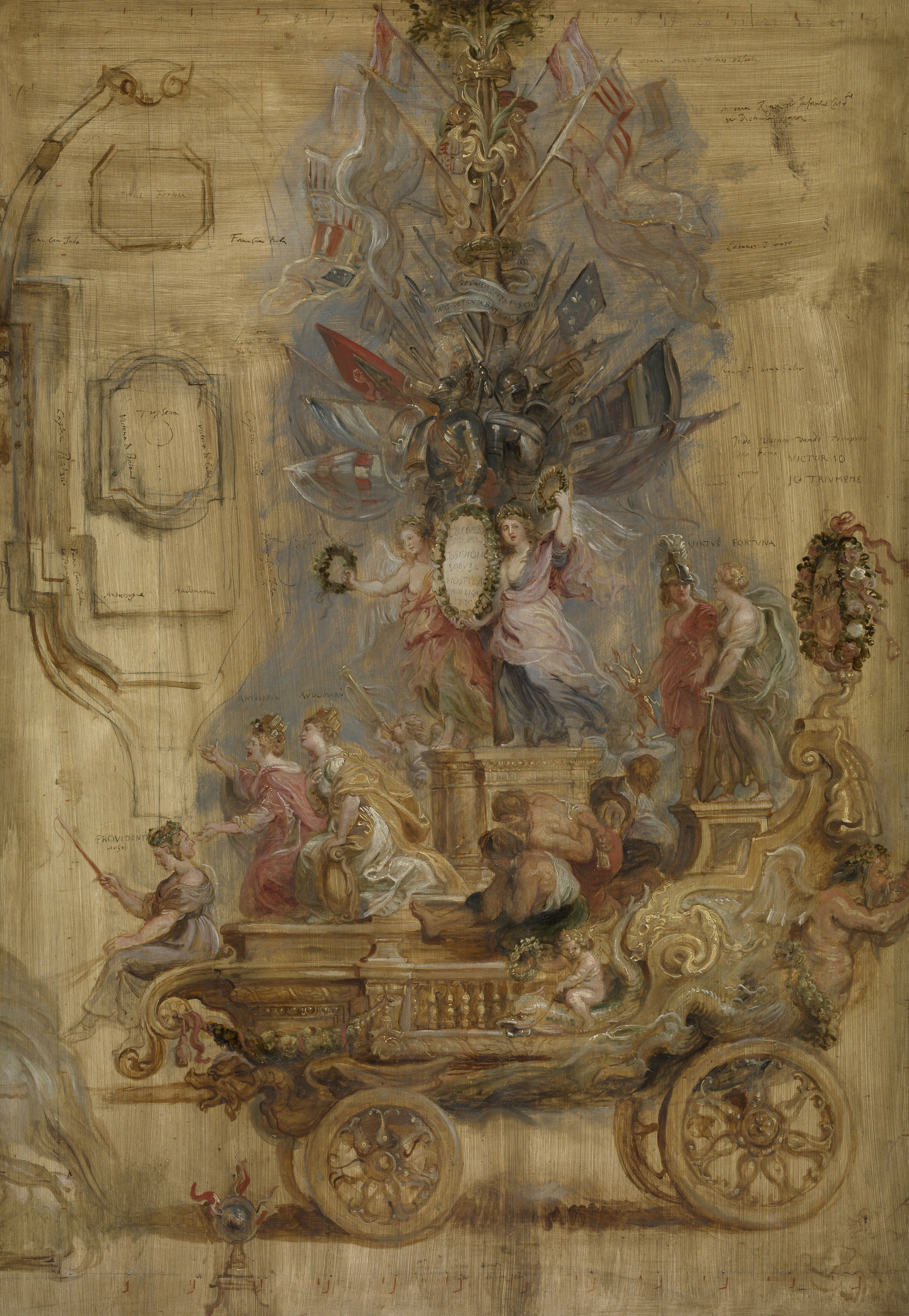
Design for a triumphal car celebrating the victory at Kallo, commissioned from Peter Paul Rubens by Antwerp city council

Events in the year 1638 in the Spanish Netherlands and Prince-bishopric of Liège (predecessor states of modern Belgium).

== Incumbents ==
=== Habsburg Netherlands ===
Monarch – Philip IV, King of Spain and Duke of Brabant, of Luxembourg, etc.

Governor General – Cardinal-Infante Ferdinand of Austria

=== Prince-Bishopric of Liège ===
Prince-Bishop – Ferdinand of Bavaria

== Events ==
- 23 January – Exports of grain prohibited.
- 24 May – French forces invest St Omer
- 20 June – Battle of Kallo
- 16 July – Siege of Saint-Omer lifted
- 26 August – Dutch siege of Geldern lifted
- 16 September – Jesuit College in Brussels stages Conversio S. Augustini

== Art and architecture ==
't Hoeveke (farmhouse), Evere, built 1638

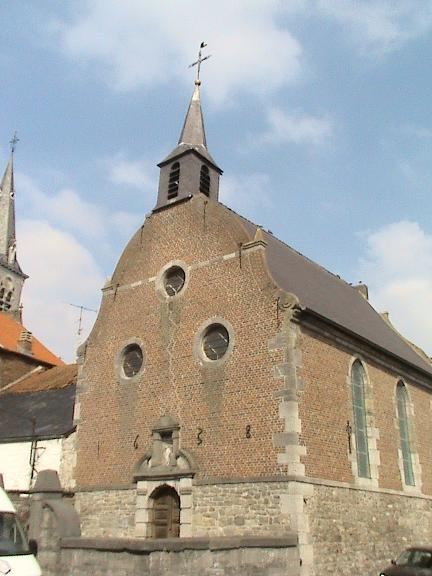
Chapel of Saint Roch, Ham-sur-Heure, completed 1638

Buildings

- 't Hoeveke, Evere.
- Chapel of Saint Roch, Ham-sur-Heure

Paintings

- Jacob Jordaens, The King Drinks (c. 1638), now in the Hermitage Museum, St-Petersburg
- Peter Paul Rubens, Het Pelsken, now in the Kunsthistorisches Museum in Vienna
- Anthony van Dyck, Triple Portrait of Henrietta Maria, now in the Royal Collection (2 parts) and the Memphis Brooks Museum of Art (1 part)
- Anthony van Dyck, Lord John Stuart and his Brother, Lord Bernard Stuart (c. 1638), now in the National Gallery, London

== Publications ==
- Relation de tout ce qui s'est passé au siège et prise de Breme (Antwerp, Plantin Press) — an account of the Siege of Breme (1638)
- Honorius Vanden Born (pen name of Erycius Puteanus), Sedigh leven, daghelycks broodt (Leuven, Everaert De Witte) – a collection of epigrams
- Jean-Jacques Courvoisier, L'Austriche saincte, ou l'Idée du vrai prélat, tirée de la vie parfaite et innocente de S. Maximilian, apôtre et patron de l'Autriche (Brussels, G. Schoevaerts) – a life of Maximilian of Lorch
- Pierre Marchant, L'Image du vray chrestien sur le poutrait de la règle du Tiers Ordre de N.B.P.S. François (Ghent, Alexander Sersanders) – a guide to living according to the rule of the Third Order of Saint Francis, dedicated to the memory of Isabella Clara Eugenia
- Jean de Wachtendonck, Vita, passio, et miracula S. Rumoldi archiepiscopi Dublinensis, Apostoli Mechliniensis & martyris (Mechelen, Henry Jaye) – a life of Rumbold of Mechlin

Newspapers

- Nieuwe Tydinghen uyt verscheyde ghewesten (Bruges, Nicolaes Breyghel)

== Births ==
- 6 February – Philips Erard van der Noot, bishop (died 1730)
- 3 June – Jean-Guillaume Carlier, painter (died 1675)

Date uncertain

- Arnold de Jode, engraver
- David Teniers III, painter

== Deaths ==
- 10 March – Cornelis van der Geest (born 1575), merchant
- 30 April – Guillaume de Steenhuys (born 1558), magistrate
- 6 May – Cornelius Jansen (born 1585), theologian
- 22 May – Hendrik van den Bergh (born 1573), nobleman
- 5 August – Peter Minuit (born 1580/85), governor of New Netherland
- 1 October – Jan Snellinck (born c. 1548), painter

Date uncertain

- Pieter Brueghel the Younger (born 1564), painter
- Andreas de Nole (born 1598), sculptor
- Jan Roos (born 1591), painter
