= 1633 in Belgium =

- Decades: 1630s; 1650s
- See also: Other events of 1633; List of years in Belgium

Events in the year 1633 in the Spanish Netherlands and Prince-bishopric of Liège (predecessor states of modern Belgium).

== Incumbents ==
=== Habsburg Netherlands ===
Monarch – Philip IV, King of Spain and Duke of Brabant, of Luxembourg, etc.

Governor General – Isabella Clara Eugenia, Infanta of Spain, to 1 December; then Marquis of Aytona as acting governor-general

=== Prince-Bishopric of Liège ===
Prince-Bishop – Ferdinand of Bavaria

== Events ==
January

- 27 January – Isabella approves a peace deal with the Dutch Republic on the condition of acknowledgement of Habsburg sovereignty.

April

- 1 April – Dutch refuse to acknowledge Habsburg sovereignty; peace talks at an impasse.
- 24 April – Great Council of Mechelen sentences René de Renesse, 1st Count of Warfusée to perpetual banishment and forfeiture of all goods for his role in the Conspiracy of Nobles.

May

- 11 May – Siege of Rheinberg commences.

December

- 27 December – Peace talks in The Hague abandoned.

== Publications ==
- Godefridus Vereycken, Tractatus de cognitione et conservatione sui (Mechelen, Henry Jaye), dedicated to the city of Antwerp.
- Richardus Versteganus, Medicamenten teghen de melancholie (Antwerp, Hendrik Aertssens), dedicated to Johannes Chrysostomus vander Sterre.

== Births ==
Date uncertain

- Theodoor Aenvanck, painter (died 1690)
- Francisco Marcos de Velasco, governor of Antwerp Citadel (died 1693)

May

- 8 May – Charles Eugene, 2nd Duke of Arenberg (died 1681)

August

- 29 August – Louis-Alexander Scockart, diplomat (died 1708)

== Deaths ==
Date uncertain

- Boetius à Bolswert (born c. 1585), engraver
- Adrien de Fléron (born 1577), clergyman
- Jan de Wael I (born 1558), painter

March

- 27 March – Peeter Cornet (born 1570/80), composer and organist

May

- 31 May – Giles de Coninck (born 1571), Jesuit theologian

October

- 21 October – Johannes Malderus (born 1563), bishop of Antwerp

December

- 1 December – Isabella Clara Eugenia (born 1566), princess
- 11 December – Gilles du Faing (born c. 1560), soldier and diplomat
- 18 December – Theodoor Galle (born 1571), engraver.
