= 1637 in Belgium =

- Decades: 1630s; 1650s
- See also: Other events of 1637; List of years in Belgium

Events in the year 1637 in the Spanish Netherlands and Prince-bishopric of Liège (predecessor states of modern Belgium).

== Incumbents ==
=== Habsburg Netherlands ===
Monarch – Philip IV, King of Spain and Duke of Brabant, of Luxembourg, etc.

Governor General – Cardinal-Infante Ferdinand of Austria

=== Prince-Bishopric of Liège ===
Prince-Bishop – Ferdinand of Bavaria

== Events ==
April

- 16 April – Assassination of Sébastien de La Ruelle, former mayor of Liège, triggers anti-Spanish rioting.

July

- 21 July – Dutch forces besiege Breda.
- 26 July – French forces commanded by Cardinal de La Valette take Landrecies.

August

- 7 August – Merchants of London formally protest seizure of English tobacco shipments to Holland.
- 25 August – Venlo retaken.

September

- 3 September – Roermond retaken.

October

- 7 October – Breda lost.

== Publications ==
- Arnold de la Porte, Compendio de la lengua española. Institutie vande Spaensche tale (Antwerp, Caesar Joachim Trognaesius), dedicated to Johannes Chrysostomus vander Sterre.
- Erycius Puteanus, De Bissexto (Leuven, Cornelius Coenestenius and Georgius Lipsius)
- Nicolaus Vernulaeus, Fritlandus, tragoedia (Leuven, J. Coppens)

Newspapers

- Nieuwe Tydinghen uyt verscheyde ghewesten (Bruges, Nicolaes Breyghel)

== Works of art ==
- Peter Paul Rubens – The Origin of the Milky Way, now in the Museo del Prado, Madrid

== Births ==
January

June

- 27 June – Alexander Voet the Younger, print maker (died 1693/1705)

September

- 14 September – Renier Meganck, painter (died 1690)

== Deaths ==
Date uncertain

March

- 12 March – Cornelius a Lapide (born 1567), Jesuit exegete

April

- 16 April – Sébastien de La Ruelle, mayor of Liège
- 17 April – René de Renesse, 1st Count of Warfusée (born c. 1580), conspirator

June

- 6 June – Pieter Huyssens (born 1577), Jesuit architect

July

- 12 July – Willem van Haecht (born 1593), painter

September

- 14 September
  - Joannes Cnobbaert (born 1590), bookseller and printmaker
  - Theodoor Rombouts (born 1597), painter

November

- 4 November – Michael Ophovius (born 1570), bishop of 's-Hertogenbosch
- 23 November – Carlos Coloma (born 1566), former commander in the Army of Flanders
