= 1630 in Belgium =

- Decades: 1630s; 1650s
- See also: Other events of 1630; List of years in Belgium

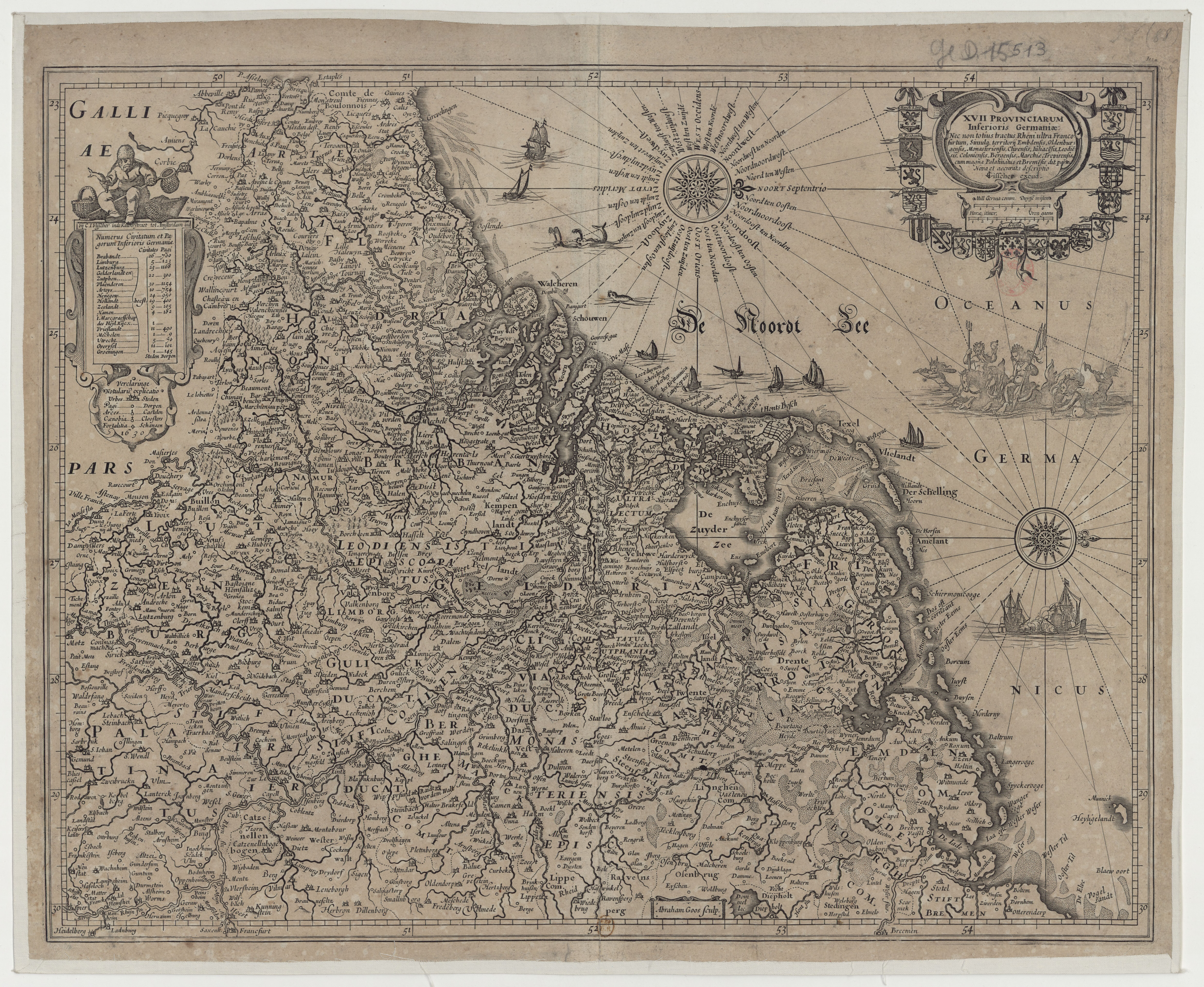
The Low Countries and the Rhineland, (Amsterdam, Claes Jansz. Visscher, 1630)

Events in the year 1630 in the Spanish Netherlands and Prince-bishopric of Liège (predecessor states of modern Belgium).

== Incumbents ==
=== Habsburg Netherlands ===
Monarch – Philip IV, King of Spain and Duke of Brabant, of Luxembourg, etc.

Governor General – Isabella Clara Eugenia, Infanta of Spain

=== Prince-Bishopric of Liège ===
Prince-Bishop – Ferdinand of Bavaria

== Events ==
- March – Peter Paul Rubens concludes a secret diplomatic mission to London.
- 12 March – Infanta Isabella grants permission for the civic Latin school in Mechelen to become the Oratorian College
- 20 April – Officials of the County of Flanders mandated to conserve and repair the coastal dunes, prohibiting hunting or the grazing of livestock in them.
- 16 June – Servaas de Quinckere consecrated as bishop of Bruges
- 15 November – Conclusion of the Treaty of Madrid, ending the Anglo-Spanish War (1625–1630)

== Publications ==
- Antonio Abbondanti, La Giuditta e le rime sacre, morali, e varie (Liège, Jean Ouwerx), dedicated to Pierluigi Carafa
- Adrien de Fléron, Promulsis Elogii Tilliani (Liège, Jean Ouwercx)
- Philip François, OSB, Daeghelijcksche oeffeninghen der novitien ghetrocken wt den reghel van S. Benedictus, translated by Jan van Blitterswyck (Brussels, Govaerdt Schoevaerdts, 1630)
- Herman Hugo, De militia equestri antiqua et nova (Antwerp, Plantin Press)
- Pierre Marchant, Sanctificatio S. Josephi sponsi Virginis, nutritii Jesu, in utero asserta (Bruges, Nicolaes Breyghel).
- Aubertus Miraeus, Notitia ecclesiarum Belgii (Antwerp, Joannes Cnobbaert), dedicated to Philip IV of Spain
- Erycius Puteanus, De begginarum (Leuven, Cornelis Coensteyn)
- Cornelius Thielmans, Seraphische historie van het leven der heyligen des oordens S. Francisci van Assysien (Leuven, Cornelis Coensteyn)

== Art and architecture ==
Paintings

- Gaspar de Crayer
  - Portrait of Ferdinand de Spoelberch
  - Portrait of Anna de Grimaldi
- Anthony van Dyck
  - Madonna and Child with Two Donors
  - The Mocking of Christ
  - Rest on the Flight into Egypt
  - Samson and Delilah
  - The Vision of the Blessed Hermann Joseph
- Peter Paul Rubens
  - Cimon and Pero
  - Minerva Protecting Peace from Mars

== Births ==
- 22 February – Jean-Baptiste Christyn, councillor (died 1690)
- 26 November – Jean Herman Voeller, secretary of state (died 1710)

Date uncertain

- Louis Philip of Egmont, nobleman (died 1682)
- Jacques-Théodore de Bryas, clergyman (died 1694)

== Deaths ==
- 24 January – Antoine de Balinghem (born 1571), Jesuit writer
- 3 March – William Stanley (born 1548), military commander
- 12 May – Joanna de Hertoghe (born c. 1566), Cistercian abbess
- 25 May – Géry de Ghersem (born 1573/75), musician
- 25 July (burial) – Jan Tilens (born 1589), painter
- 17 August – Lodewijk Makeblijde (born 1565), Jesuit poet
- 27 August – Hendrick de Clerck (born c. 1560), painter
- 25 September – Ambrogio Spinola (born 1569), military commander
- 9 October – Engelbert Maes (born 1545), councillor
- 5 November – Charles Malapert (born 1581), Jesuit astronomer
- 28 December – Joannes van Gouda (born 1571), Jesuit controversialist
