= 1632 in Belgium =

- Decades: 1630s; 1650s
- See also: Other events of 1632; List of years in Belgium

Events in the year 1632 in the Spanish Netherlands and Prince-bishopric of Liège (predecessor states of modern Belgium).

== Incumbents ==
=== Habsburg Netherlands ===
Monarch – Philip IV, King of Spain and Duke of Brabant, of Luxembourg, etc.

Governor General – Isabella Clara Eugenia, Infanta of Spain

=== Prince-Bishopric of Liège ===
Prince-Bishop – Ferdinand of Bavaria

== Events ==
January

- 25 January – Gaston of Orleans arrives in Brussels to join Marie de Medici in exile.

March

- Anthony van Dyck leaves for London.

April

- 15 April – Johann Tserclaes, Count of Tilly, mortally wounded in the Battle of Rain.

May

- Conspiracy of Nobles: the prince of Barbançon, prince of Espinoy, duke of Bournonville and count of Egmont plot to overthrow Spanish rule in the Southern Netherlands.
- 22 May – States General of the United Provinces call upon southern provinces to rise against Spain, promising freedom of worship.

June

- 9 June – Siege of Maastricht begins.
- June – Count of Bergh defects to the Dutch.
- 25 June ¬– Circular from the Infanta Isabella brands Bergh a traitor.
- 30 July – The Infanta summons the Estates General, to meet on 7 September.

August

- 22 August – Fall of Maastricht: Brabantine lordship of the city lost to the Dutch Republic; the Prince-Bishop of Liège retains his share in the lordship.
- Dutch raiding parties reach the vicinity of Namur and Mons.

September

- 7 September – Estates General convene what will be their last session (dissolved in 1634).
- 11 September – Estates General delegate negotiators for peace talks with Dutch.
- 18 September – Cardinal de la Cueva, Spanish ambassador, leaves Brussels.

October

- 3 October – Marquis of Santa Cruz leaves the Low Countries in disgrace.
- 10 October – Dutch refuse to treat with delegates of the Estates General.

December

- 7 December – Delegates of the Estates General received in The Hague.

== Publications ==
- Guilielmus Bolognino, Uyt-vaert van het ghereformeert nachtmael (Antwerp, Joannes Cnobbaert)
- Jean-Jacques Courvoisier, Extases, de la princesse du Midy, la belle Malceda, au palais du sage roy Salomon (Brussels, Jean Pepermans).
- [Jesuit missionaries], Jaerlijcksche brieven van Japonien der jaren 1625. 1626. 1627 (Antwerp, Joannes Cnobbaert)
- Ángel Manrique, La venerable madre, Ana de Jesus, discipula y compañera, de la s.m. Teresa de Jesus (Brussels, Lucas van Meerbeeck)
- Jean Puget de la Serre, Histoire curieuse de tout ce qui s'est passé à l'entrée de la Reyne Mère du Roy tres chrestien dans les villes des Pays Bas (Antwerp, Plantin Press).
- Bonaventura Speeckaert, Den Spieghel der Patientie onses salighmakers Iesu Christi ghebenediidt (Antwerp, Joannes Cnobbaert)
- Godefridus Wendelinus, Aries seu Aurei velleris encomium (Antwerp, Plantin Press under Balthasar Moretus)
- Augustinus Wichmans, Brabantia Mariana tripartita (Antwerp, Joannes Cnobbaert)

== Births ==
Date uncertain

- Reynier Covyn, painter (died 1681)
- Hendrik van Minderhout, painter (died 1696)
- Jan Baptist de Wael, painter (died after 1669)

January

- 11 January – Adam Frans van der Meulen, painter (died 1690)

July

- 26 July – Simon Du Bois, painter (died 1706)

== Deaths ==
Date uncertain

- Ambrosius Francken II, painter
- Somhairle Mac Domhnail (born around 1580), Irish soldier

April

- 30 April – Johann Tserclaes, Count of Tilly (born 1559), military commander

June

- 21 June – Anselmus de Boodt (born 1550), naturalist

July

- 16 July – Conrad III Schetz (born 1553), diplomat
- 17 July – Hendrick van Balen (born 1573/75), painter
- 19 July – Robert Maudhuy, bookseller

December

- 23 December – Crisóstomo Henríquez (born 1594), Cistercian historian
