= Corona Regia =

1615 satire of James I

- Author: Euphormione (pseudonym)
- Original title: Is. Casauboni corona regia. Id est panegyrici cuiusdam vere aurei, quem Iacobo I. Magnæ Britanniæ, &c. Regi, fidei defensori delinearat, fragmenta, ab Euphormione inter schedas τοῦ μακαρίτου collecta, & in lucem edita
- Language: Latin
- Subject: James I of England
- Genre: satirical panegyric
- Published: London (false address; really Leuven)
- Publisher: John Bill (false address)
- Publication date: 1615
- English publication date: 2010
- Pages: 129

Corona Regia (Latin for "Royal Crown") was a scandalous satire of King James I of England. It was written from the fictional perspective of an unfinished panegyric of the king found among the papers of Isaac Casaubon (1559–1614) and published by John Bill, the king's printer. In fact neither Casaubon nor Bill had anything to do with the publication. Corona Regia has been described as "an important text in the history of satire, in the history of English monarchy, and in study of seventeenth-century English theological debates".

== Investigation ==
The king was so offended by the book that attempts to identify and punish those involved in its production took up considerable time and energy of English diplomats on the Continent. This was a special concern for William Trumbull at the court of the Archdukes Albert and Isabella, as their historiographer royal, Erycius Puteanus, was under particular suspicion of being the author. Trumbull, who spent over £6,500 on his investigation, later shifted his suspicions to a student at Leuven University named Cornelius Breda. Nobody was ever brought to trial.

== Later editions ==
A scholarly edition and translation by Tyler Fyotek, with an introduction by Winfried Schleiner, was published by Droz in 2010.

In 2011 Dana F. Sutton produced a hypertext edition and translation for the University of Birmingham's "Philological Museum" Website.
