= Jean-Guillaume Carlier =

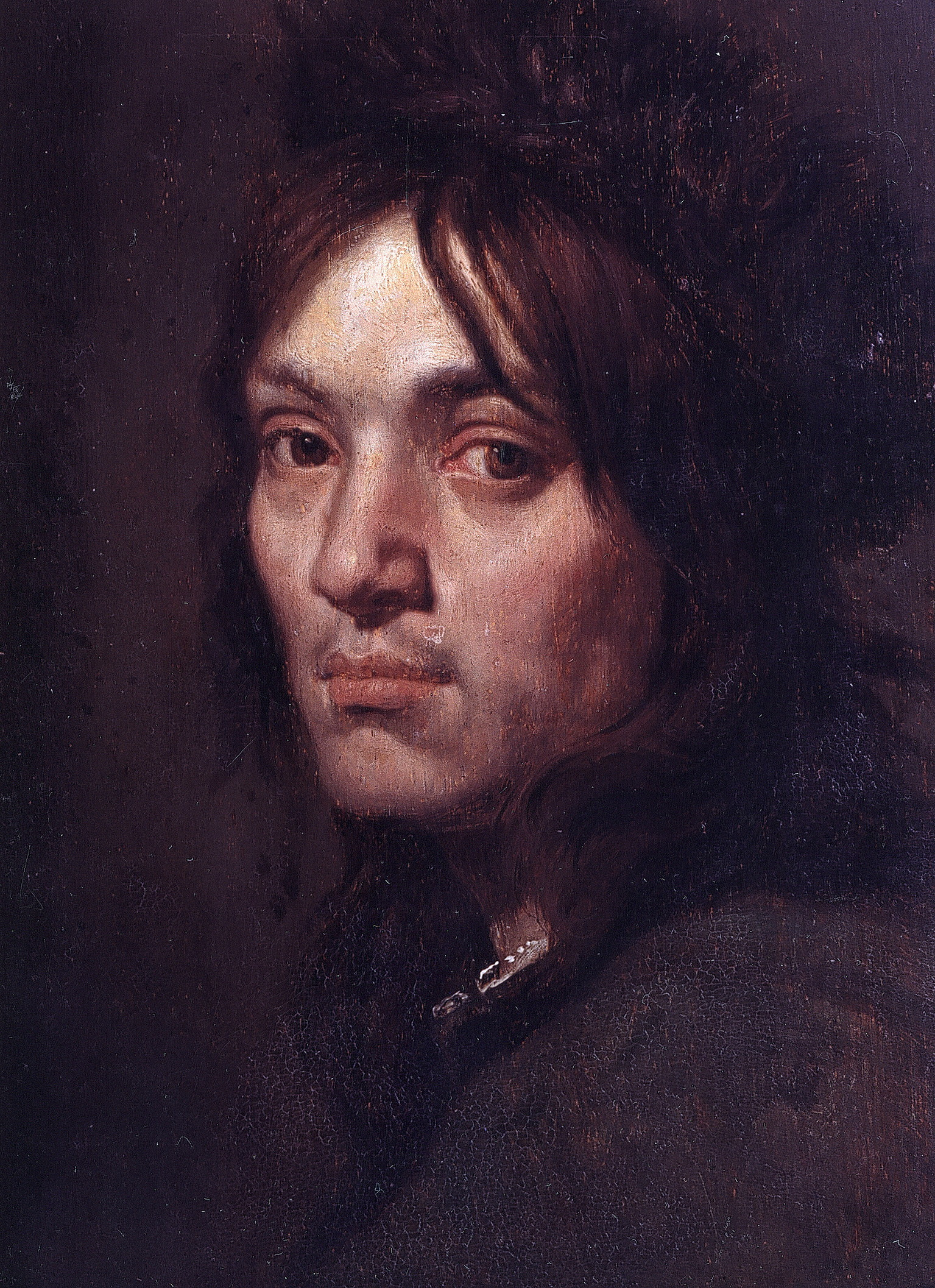
Selfportrait, 1660 (Musée de l'Art wallon, Liège)

Jean-Guillaume Carlier, a Southern-Netherlandish painter, was born in Liège in 1638, and died there in 1675.

He was a pupil of Bertholet Flémalle, and spent part of his life in France. Most of his works are in Düsseldorf and St. Petersburg. His chef-d'oeuvre was considered his Martyrdom of Saint Denis, destroyed in 1794, but of which a copy was painted in 1806 in the church of St. Denis (Liège), and of which a study survives in the Royal Museums of Fine Arts of Belgium in Brussels.

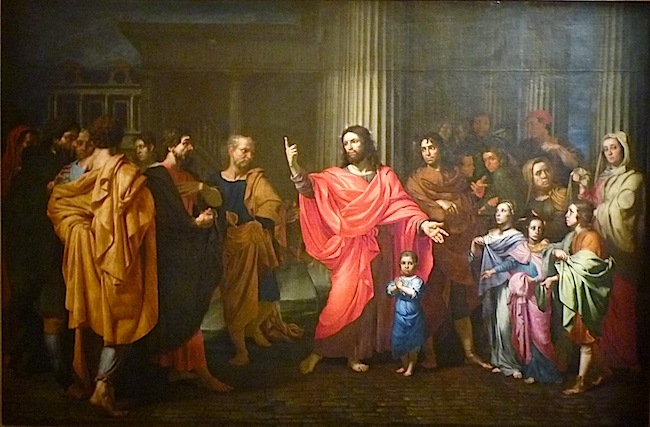
Christ and the children

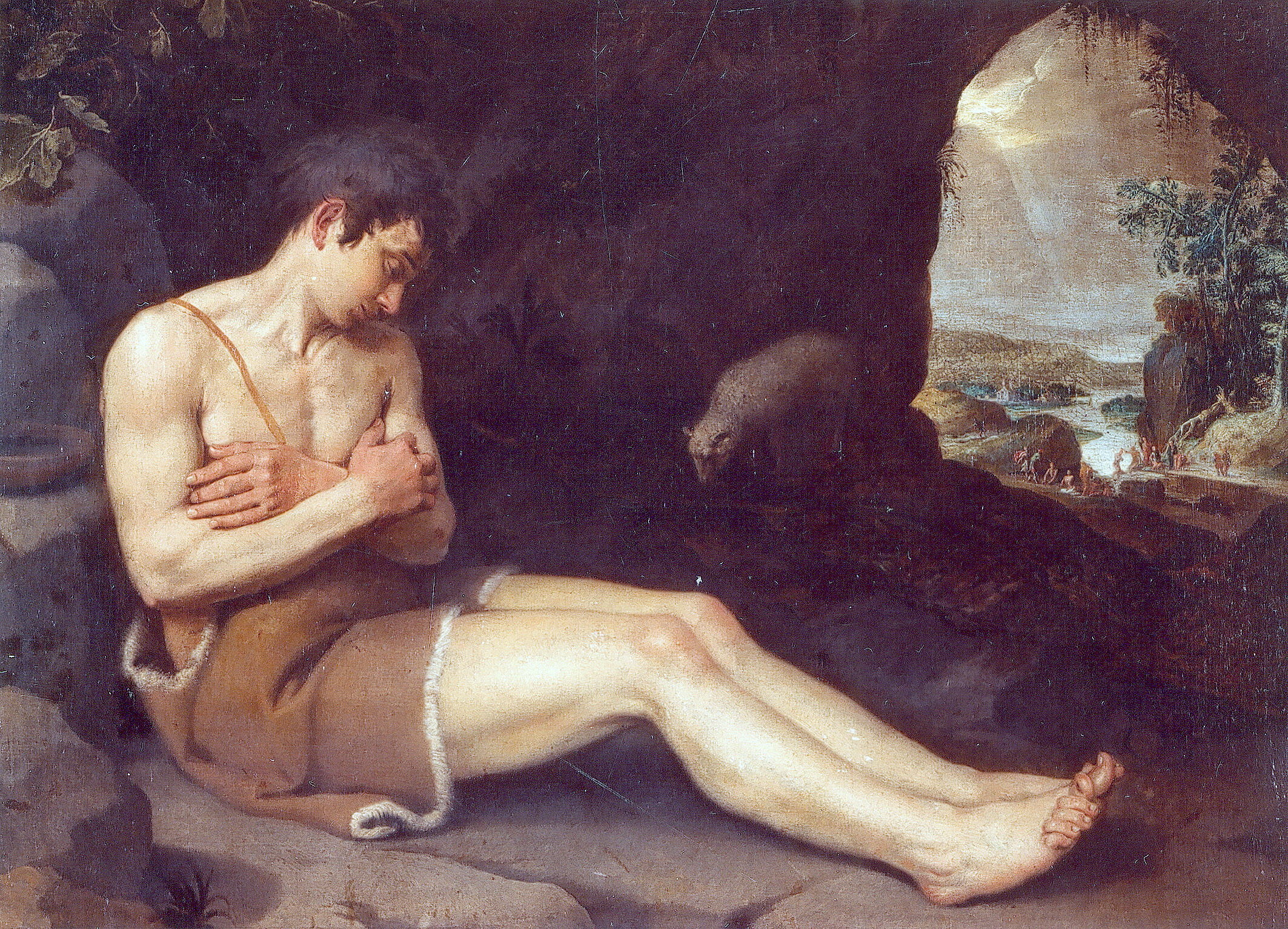
Saint John the Baptist asleep in a cave

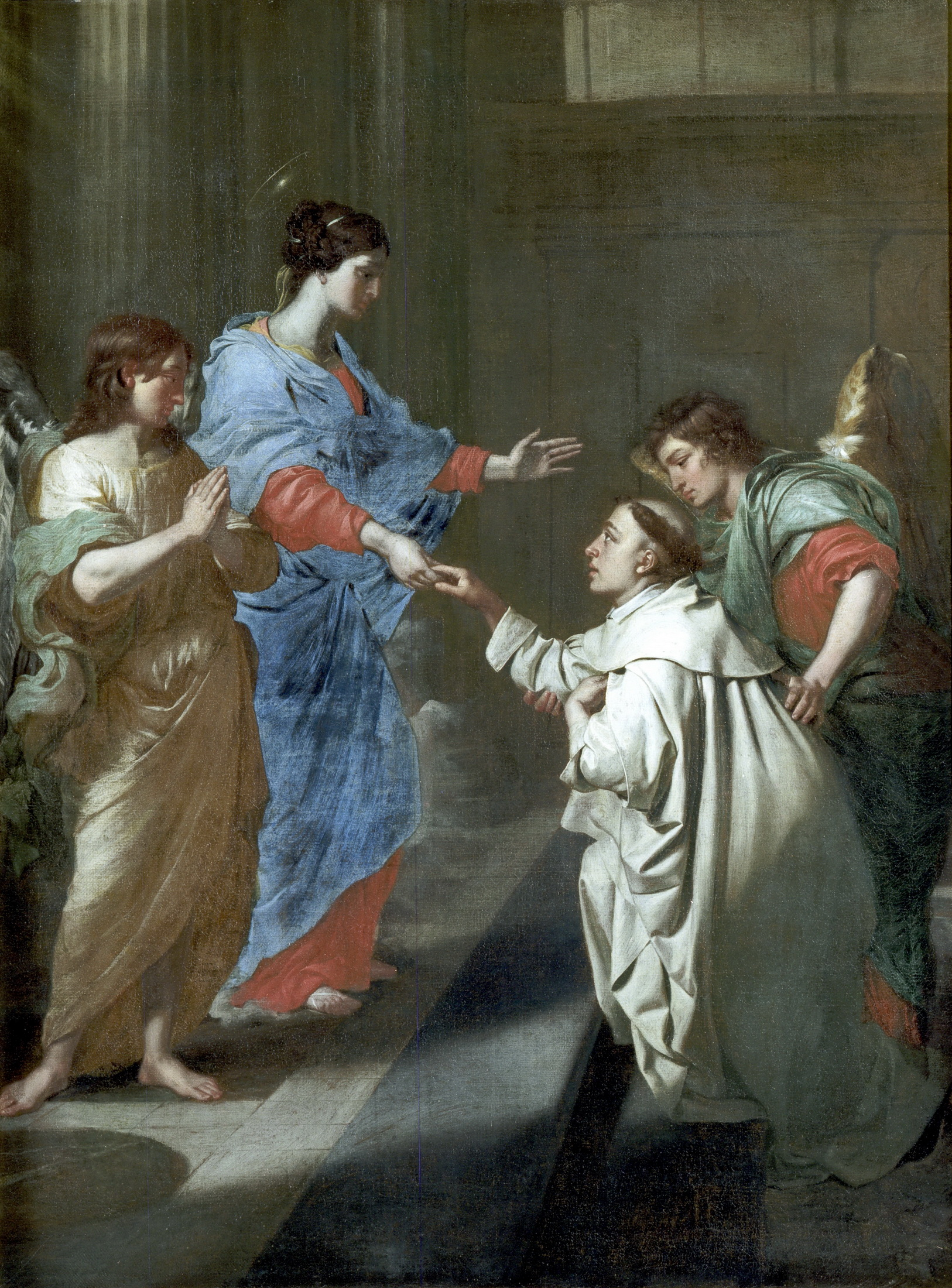
Vision of Hermann-Joseph of Steinfeld

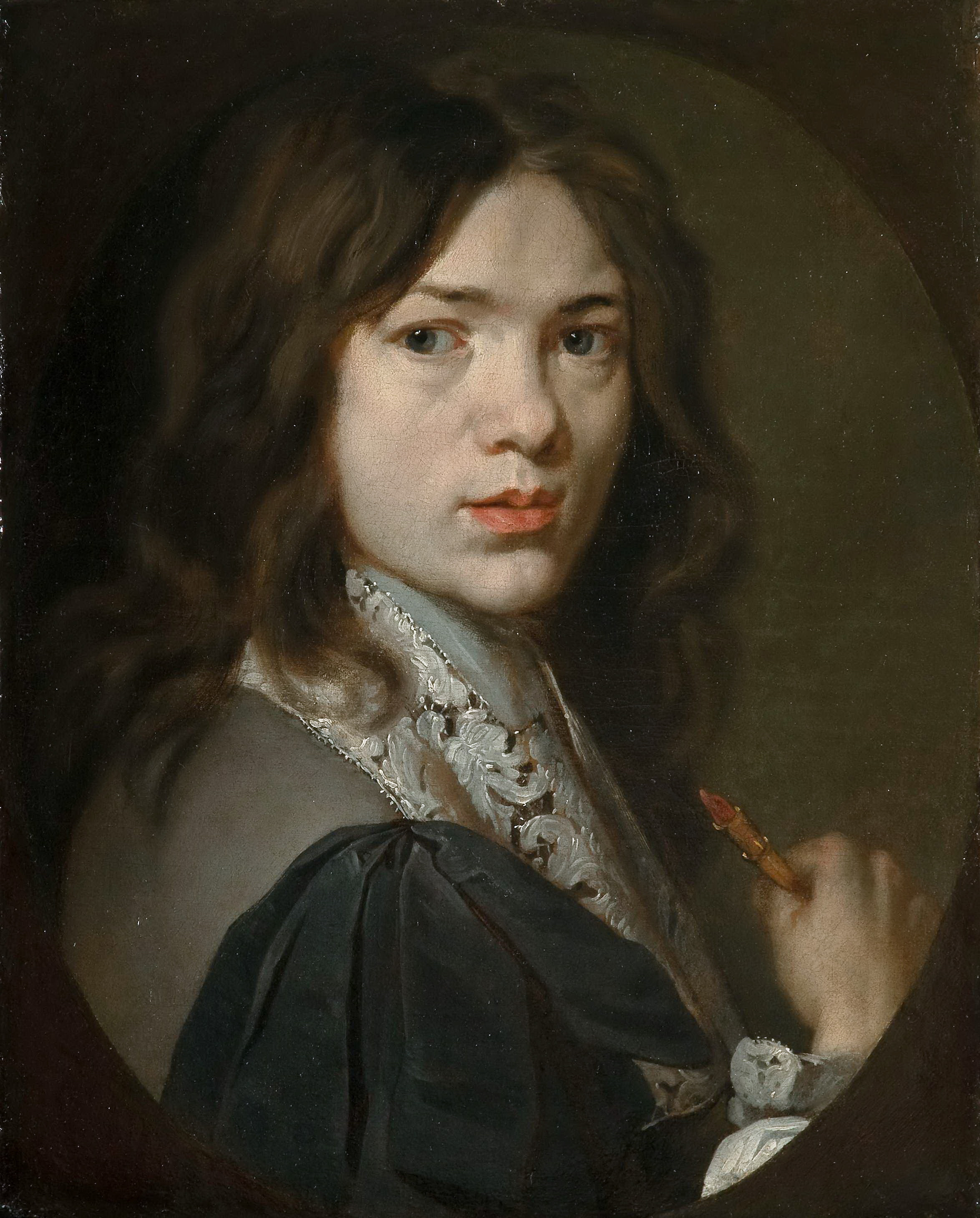
Portrait of a young man
