= J. A. Cools =

J. A. Cools (active around 1629) was a 17th-century poet from the Duchy of Brabant known only from a collection of religious pastoral poetry. His Geestelycke Herders-dichten, behelsende Brusselsche Bee-vaert, Bethléem, Scherpenheuvel was published in Brussels by Jan Mommaert in 1629. It contains lengthy poems about shepherds going on pilgrimages to the Sacrament of Miracle in Brussels, to Bethlehem, and to the Shrine of Our Lady of Scherpenheuvel.
