= Gommaert van der Gracht =

Flemish painter and draughtsman

Gommaert van der Gracht or Gommaer van der Gracht (c. 1590 – 1639) was a Flemish painter and draughtsman mainly known for his still life and landscape paintings.

== Life ==
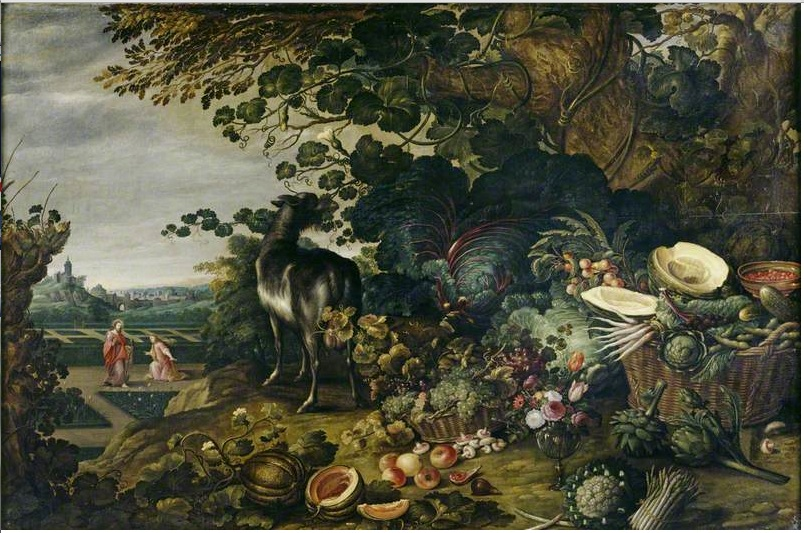
An Extensive Landscape with Exotic Flowers, Fruit and Vegetables and a 'Noli me Tangere' in the Garden Beyond

Details about van der Gracht's life are scarce. He was born in Mechelen some time between 1580 and 1600 as the son of Gommaert van der Gracht (died in 1603) and An Darts. According to the register of pupils of the local Guild of Saint Luke he trained under Michiel Coxie the Younger (son of Michiel Coxie) from 1 January 1602. It is not clear whether he remained in his hometown during his whole career. He died in Mechelen.

He had a brother or relative called Jacob van der Gracht who trained with him, became a portrait painter and printmaker and died in The Hague in 1651 or 1652.

== Work ==
Gommaert van der Gracht specialised in landscapes and still lifes. His still lifes include market and kitchen pieces as well as fruit and game pieces. He often set his still lifes in landscapes. He also painted genre scenes. Very few works by his hand were known to exist and only recently his oeuvre has expanded through new attributions.

There is a large signed painting by him depicting a Landscape with flowers, fruit, vegetables with three putti in the Stedelijke Musea Mechelen. The execution of this work is precise. Its tonality is representative of the period with brown, green and blue tones. Another signed painting was sold at l’Hôtel Rameau, Versailles, on 7 June 1967, as lot 224. In 2005 the National Trust acquired the large (175.3 × 269.2 cm) composition An Extensive Landscape with Exotic Flowers, Fruit and Vegetables and a 'Noli me Tangere' in the Garden Beyond, which is on view at Rufford Old Hall. The composition combines a landscape, still life, animal painting with a religious scene in the background where there is a formal garden in which the risen Christ appears to Mary Magdalene. A landscape, very comparable to this painting, is recorded by E. Greindl in Les Peintres Flamands de Nature Morte au XV11e Siecle, 1983 as in a private collection in Rio de Janeiro.

Dorotheum auctioned on 24 April 2007 in Vienna as lot 424 a composition of The Kermis of St. George in a Flemish Village, a genre scene which goes back to similar scenes painted by 16th century Flemish artists such as Pieter Bruegel the Elder.

== Link ==
Works by Gommaert van der Gracht at arcadja.com
