= Simon Verepaeus =

Dutch priest and educator (1522–1598)

- Simon Verrept
- Born: 1522; Dommelen, Duchy of Brabant, Habsburg Netherlands
- Died: 10 November 1598 (aged 76) 's-Hertogenbosch, Duchy of Brabant, Habsburg Netherlands
- Education: Louvain University
- Occupations: priest and teacher
- Writing career
- Language: Latin
- Period: Renaissance
- Genres: education
- Subjects: Latin composition, Latin grammar, prayer
- Notable works: Enchiridion precationum piarum (1565), Grammaticae Despauterianae (1571)
- Movement: Catholic Reformation

Simon Verepaeus or Verrept (1522–10 November 1598) was a Dutch priest and educator in the 16th-century Habsburg Netherlands, whose works on prayer, Latin grammar, and Latin composition continued to be reprinted until the early 19th century.

== Life ==
Verepaeus was born at Dommelen in the Duchy of Brabant (now North Brabant) in 1522. After studying the Liberal Arts and Theology at Leuven University he was ordained priest and became chaplain to the Augustinian canonesses of Mount Thabor Convent outside Mechelen. There he compiled the Enchiridion precationum piarum, one of the most reprinted prayer books of the Tridentine Church, which was translated into all the major languages of Western Europe except English.

During the early stages of the Dutch Revolt Verepaeus sought refuge first in Cologne, where he stayed at the College of the Three Crowns in 1567, and later in Hilvarenbeek, where he taught at the town's college under the headmastership of Nicolas Busius. His introduction to Latin grammar and his handbooks on Latin composition were initially written for use in the school.

In 1572, he returned to his duties at Mount Thabor Convent, but on 2 October 1572, during the Spanish Fury at Mechelen, the convent was burned down and his library destroyed. He nevertheless remained in the city, contributing to its reconstruction, until 1578, when the community he served temporarily disbanded. In 1580 he was living in Helmond, and from 1585 he lived in 's-Hertogenbosch, where he held a canonry in the cathedral and was headmaster of the city's college. He died in 's-Hertogenbosch on 10 November 1598.

== Publications ==
- Enchiridion precationum piarum (Antwerp, Joannes Bellerus, 1565); 1572 Dilingen edition available on Google Books
  - Dutch edition as Een hantboecxken van christelijcke ende devote ghebeden (Antwerp, 1571) available on Google Books; also 1573 edition
  - French edition as Recueil ou manuel catholique d'oraisons devotes (Antwerp, 1593) available on Google Books
- Grammaticae Despauterianae (Antwerp, Plantin Press, 1571); 1578 edition available on Google Books
- Latinae linguae progymnasmata (Antwerp, printed by Joannes Withagen for Antonius Tilenius Brechtanus, 1572) Available on Google Books
- Epistolae Aliquot Selectiores Ioan. Lodovici Vivis (Antwerp, printed by Joannes Withagen for Antonius Tilenius Brechtanus, 1572); an edition of the letters of Juan Luis Vives for use in schools; available on Google Books
- Institutiones scholasticae (Antwerp, Joannes Bellerus, 1573)
- Selectiores epistolae clarorum virorum (Antwerp, Joannes Bellerus, 1574); an anthology of letters by famous Latin writers for use in schools; reprinted in Constance (available on Google Books), Cologne and Dilingen
- De epistolis latine conscribendis (Antwerp, Anthonius Tilenius, 1574) Available on Google Books
- De ingenuis scholasticorum moribus libellus (Antwerp, Joannes Bellerus, 1580); 1583 edition available on Google Books
- Praeceptiones de verborum et rerum copia (Cologne, Gerwin Calenius, 1582); 1590 edition available on Google Books
