= The Dance of the Villagers =

1635 painting by Peter Paul Rubens

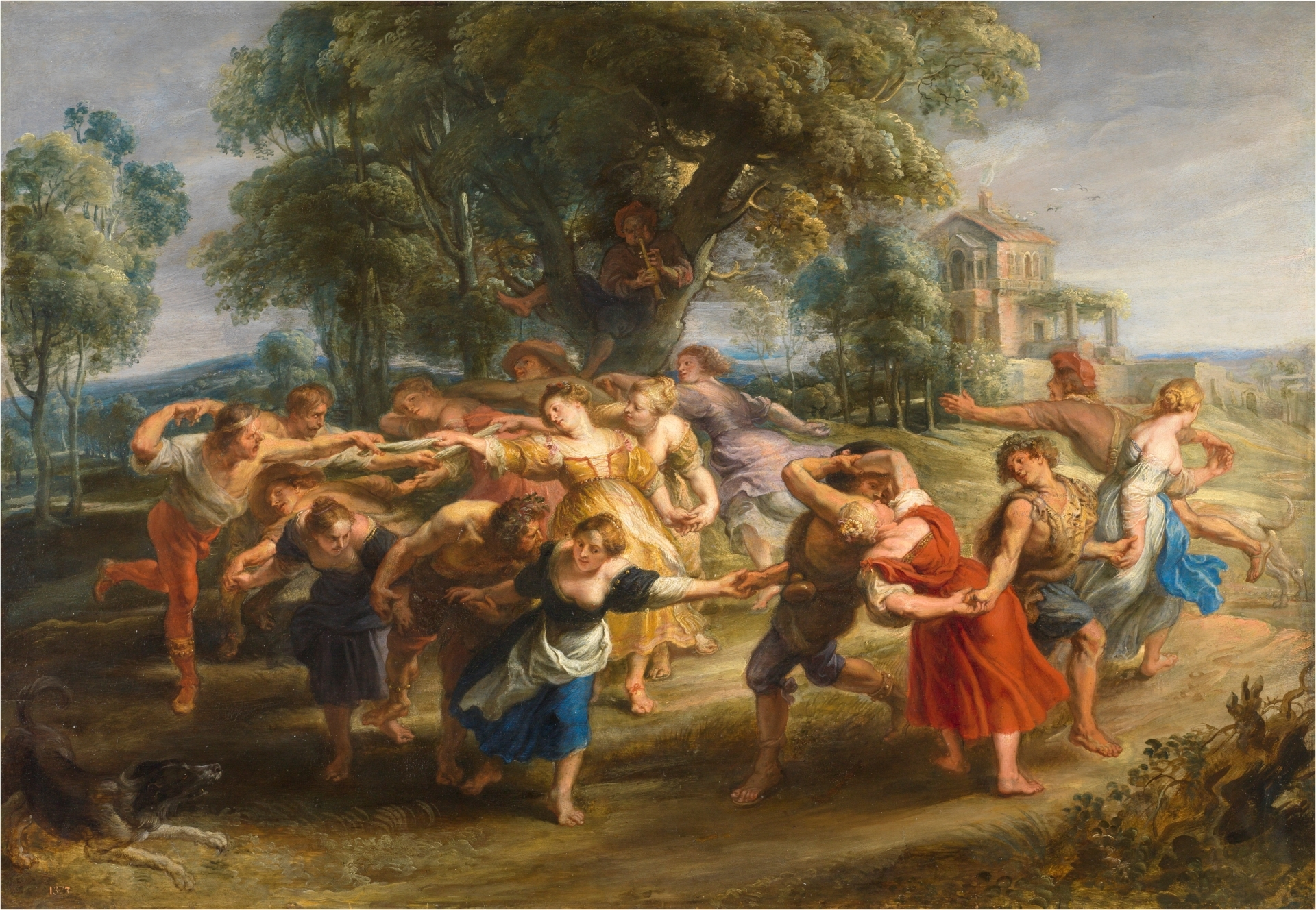
The Dance of the Villagers (1635) by Rubens

The Dance of the Villagers is a 1635 painting by Peter Paul Rubens. now in the Prado Museum in Madrid. It is closely related to The Village Fête, of a similar date and on a similar subject.

After Rubens' death, Philip IV of Spain sent his ambassador to buy paintings from the artist's estate - he bought this one for 800 florins and the king hang it in his summer dining room in the old Royal Alcázar of Madrid. It is now in the Prado Museum, in Madrid.
