= Self-Portrait (Rubens, Vienna) =

1638–1639 painting by Peter Paul Rubens

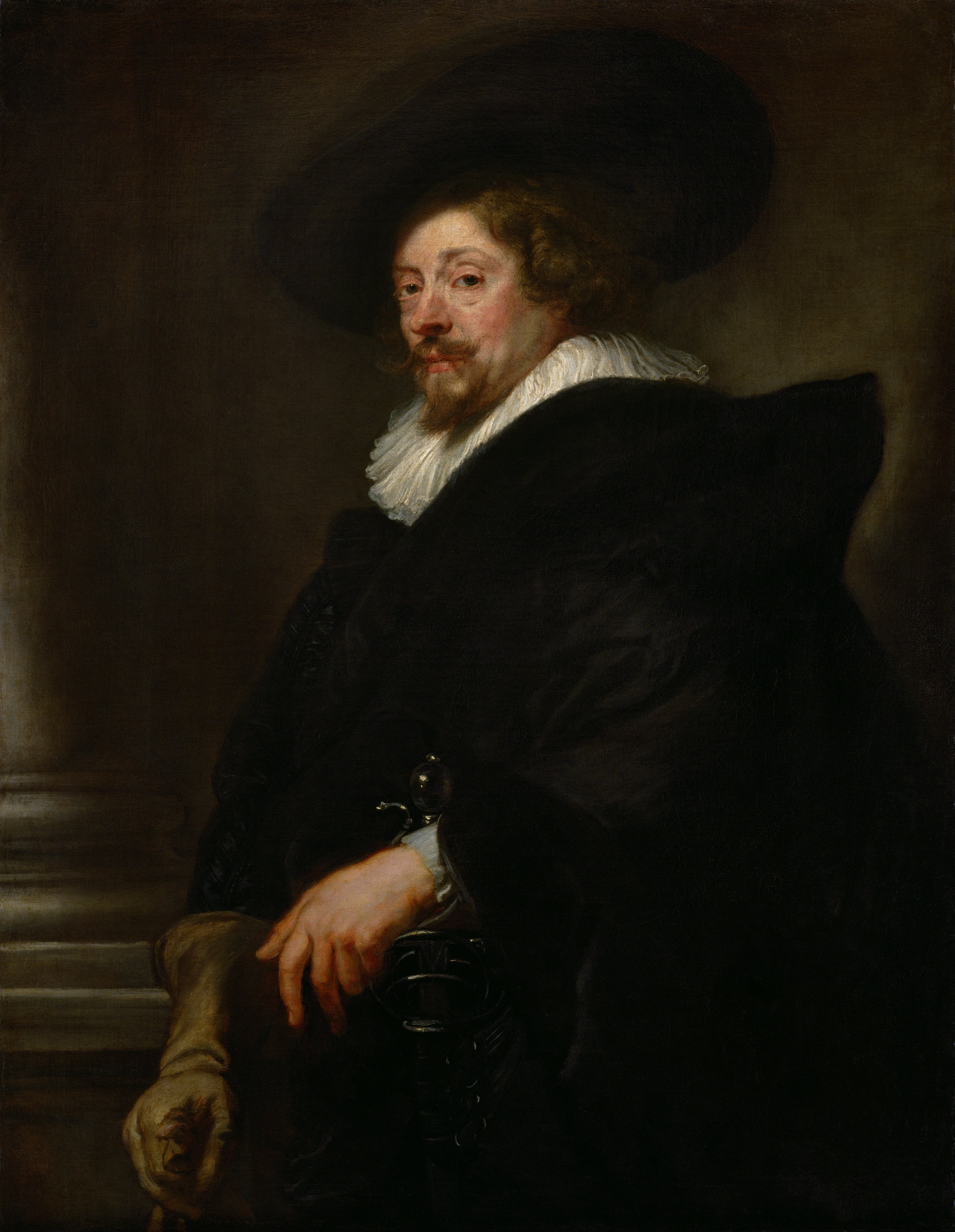
Self-Portrait (1638–1639) by Rubens

The Self-portrait is an oil on canvas by Rubens measuring 109.5 cm by 85 cm and dating to between 1638 and 1639. It is now in the Kunsthistorisches Museum in Vienna. It is a courtly portrait in style (such as showing the sword, glove and column), but shows more attention to facial detail than it was usual in a portrait of that kind.
