= Franciscus Piroulle =

- Born: Limbourg, Duchy of Limburg
- Died: 1663; Liège
- Education: Leuven University
- Occupations: Theologian, Canon, Cantor
- Years active: 1607-1663

François, France or Franciscus Piroulle (died 1663) was a theologian in the Habsburg Netherlands and the Prince-Bishopric of Liège.

== Life ==
Piroulle was born in Limbourg (Duchy of Limburg) and studied at Leuven University, where he graduated with a licentiate in philosophy in 1607 and later as Licentiate in Sacred Theology. From 1613 to 1621 he taught at Lily College, Leuven. In 1621 he moved to Bruges, where he had been appointed to a canonry of St. Donatian's Cathedral on 4 May 1620. On 11 January 1634 he delivered the funerary oration for the Infanta Isabella in the cathedral. In 1637 he was appointed canon and cantor of St Paul's minster in Liège. Around 1645 he was appointed professor and president of the Diocesan Seminary of Liège, resigning the presidency in 1651. He died in Liège in 1663, and was succeeded as cantor by Jacques Hodeige on 13 August of that year.
