= Jeanne de Cambry =

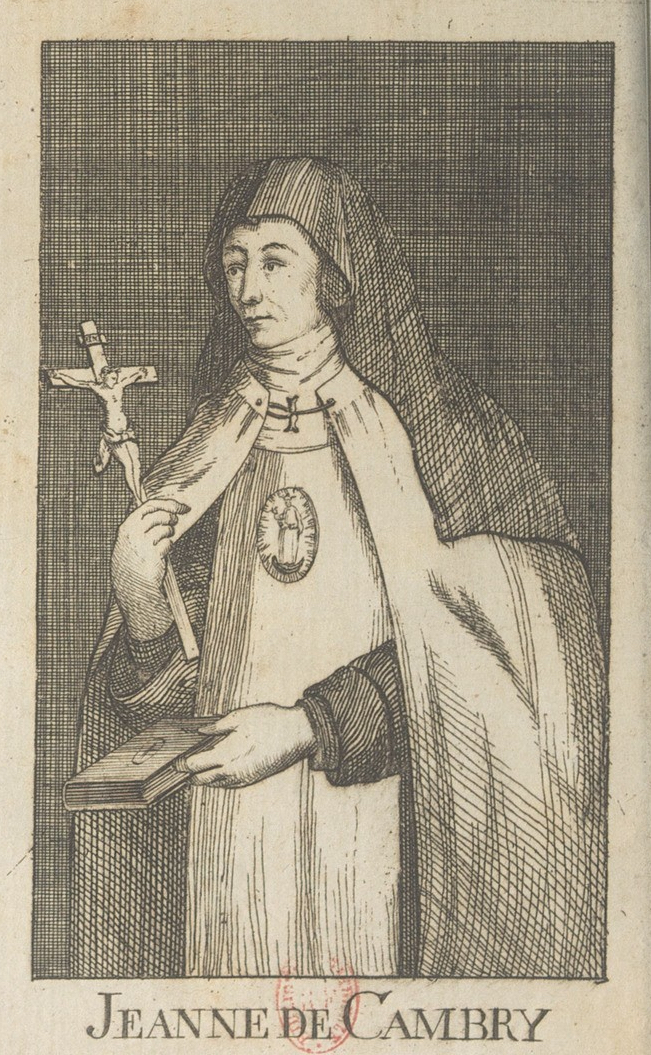

Jeanne de Cambry or Jeanne-Marie de la Présentation (1581–1639) was an ascetic author and religious foundress in the Habsburg Netherlands.

== Life ==
Jeanne was born in Douai on 15 November 1581. Her father was a city councillor of Tournai and her mother, Louise de Guyon, was daughter of Ferry de Guyon. In 1604 she took the habit in the Augustinian Abbey of Saint Nicolas des Prés in Tournai. In 1619 she transferred to Notre Dame de Sion, also in Tournai, but after two years there the bishop, Maximilien Villain, appointed her prioress of Menin hospital, with a brief to reform discipline in the community. She obtained permission to found a new order, the Ladies of the Presentation, with a stricter rule. This was established in Lille on 25 November 1623, with the foundress taking the name Jeanne-Marie de la Présentation. She died in Lille on 19 July 1639.

== Works ==
- Petit exercice pour pouvoir acquérir l'amour de Dieu (Tournai, 1620)
- Traicté de la ruine de l'amour propre et bâtiment de l'amour divin (Tournai, 1627; Paris 1645)
  - The manuscript of the English translation by Agnes More was published as The Building of Divine Love in an edition by Dorothy Latz in 1992.
- Le flambeau mystique ou adresse des âmes pieuses es secrets et cachez sentiers de la vie intérieure (Tournai, 1631)
- Traité de la réforme du mariage (Tournai, 1655)
- Traité de l'excellence de la solitude (Tournai, 1656)
- Lamentation de l'âme captive dans son corps mortel (Tournai, 1656)

Her collected works were printed in Tournai in 1665 by the Widow of Adrien Quinqué.
