= Jean Scohier =

Jean Scohier (active c. 1584–1629 or earlier) was a clergyman, genealogist and writer on heraldry from the Habsburg Netherlands.

== Life ==
Scohier, a clergyman from Beaumont in the County of Hainaut, became almoner to the House of Croÿ and compiled their genealogy, which was printed in 1589 but with a letter of dedication dated 8 May 1584. Around 1584 he was appointed chaplain to Maximilien Morillon, bishop of Tournai. He was awarded a canonry of the chapter of Bergen op Zoom, but was unable to reside there as it had fallen under the control of the Dutch Republic. He also held the title of protonotary apostolic. At some point he also seems to have become a canon of Tournai cathedral. He had died by mid-1629, as the letter of dedication of the second edition of his heraldic treatise L'estat et comportement des armes, dated 16 July 1629, refers to him as the "late Jean Scohier of happy memory".

== Writings ==
- La genealogie et descente de la tres-illustre maison de Croÿ (Douai, Widow of Jacques Boscard, 1589)
- L'estat et comportement des armes, livre autant utile que nécessaire à tous gentilshommes et officiers d'armes (Brussels, Jan Mommaert, 1597); reprinted 1629.
