= Helena Fourment with Her Son Frans =

Painting by Peter Paul Rubens

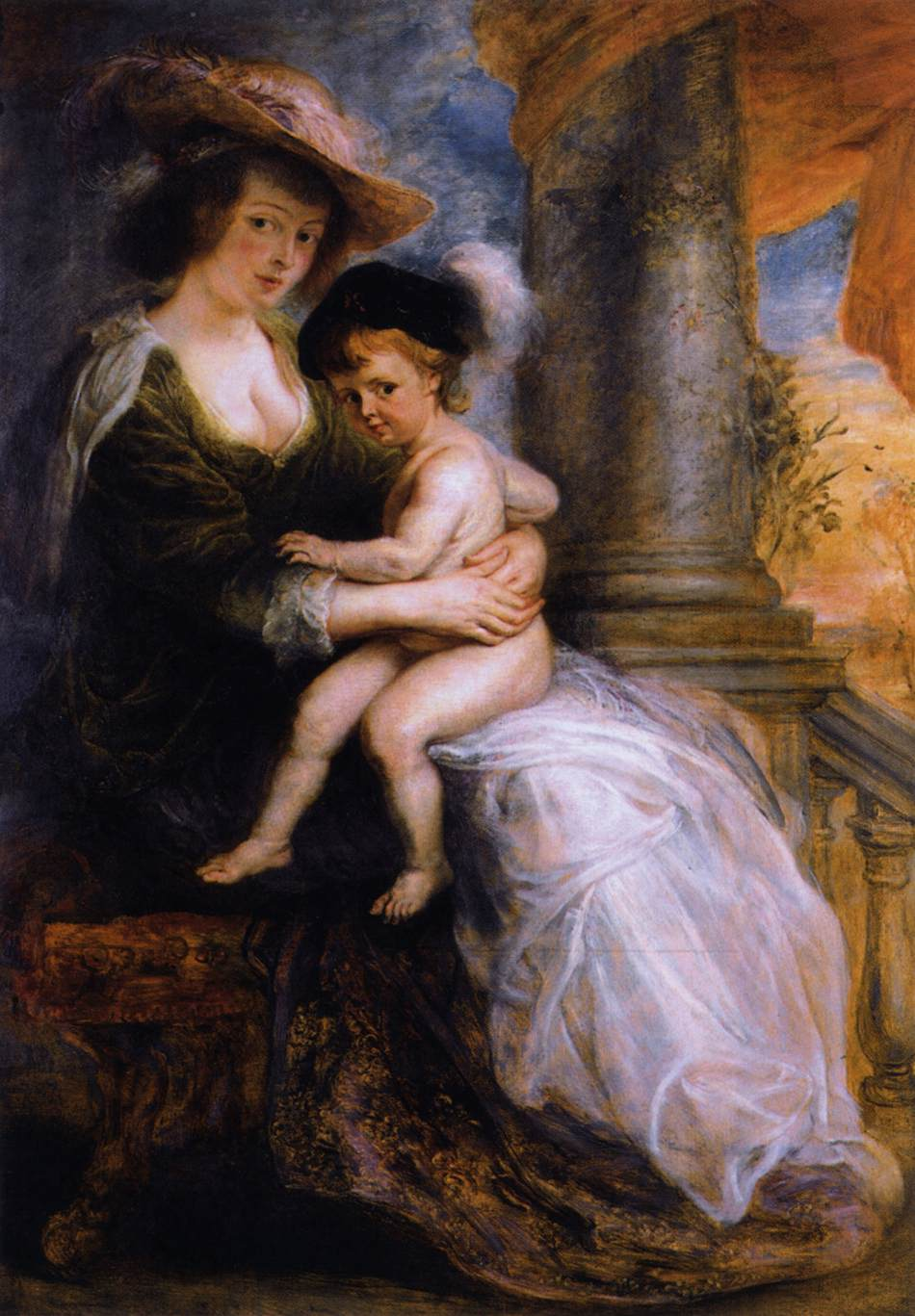
Helena Fourment with her son Frans (c. 1635) by Rubens

Helena Fourment with her son Frans is a c.1635 painting by Peter Paul Rubens, showing his second wife Helena Fourment holding their second son Frans (born 12 July 1633). As of 2014, it is in the Alte Pinakothek in Munich.
