= Godfried Vereycken =

Physician (1558–1635)

Godfried Vereycken (1558–1635) was a physician from the Habsburg Netherlands and one of the founders of the city of Antwerp's medical board.

== Life ==
Vereycken was born in Antwerp in 1558. For some years he taught philosophy at the Collège de Boncourt in Paris, while studying medicine. He obtained the doctorate in medicine from the University of Toulouse on 13 April 1586. In 1591 he became a medical practitioner in his native city. In 1617, together with Lazarus Marcquis, he drafted and presented a petition to the city council of Antwerp, signed by eleven other doctors, for the establishment of a Collegium Medicum to regulate the practice of medicine and pharmacy in the city and combat the spread of quack remedies. The first steps towards founding this board were taken by a decision of the city council on 28 April 1620. Its effective functioning began on 12 September 1624, empowered to license and discipline doctors, inspect pharmacies, and examine the competence of surgeons, pharmacists and midwives.

Vereycken retired from medical practice around 1630 and moved to Mechelen, where his son was a councillor of the Great Council. He died in that city on 2 December 1635.

== Writings ==
- Tractatus de cognitione et conservatione sui (Mechelen, Henry Jaye, 1625; second edition 1633).
