= Jan Mommaert =

Two 17th century printers in Brussels

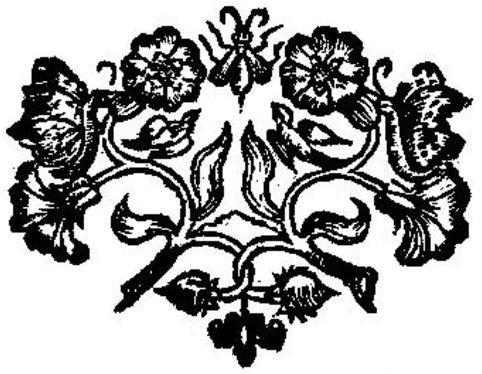
- Decorative feature from a Mommaert imprint
- Occupations: printer and bookseller
- Years active: 1585–1627
- Era: handpress
- Organization: City of Brussels
- Notable work: Descriptio et explicatio pegmatum, arcuum et spectaculorum (1594)
- Spouse: Martine van Straeten
- Children: Jan (II) Mommaert (1611–1669)

Jan Mommaert was the name of two 17th-century printers in Brussels, father (active 1585–1627) and son (active 1646–1669). Between the dates of their activity, Martine van Straeten operated a printing house under the name Widow of Jan Mommaert.

== Jan (I) Mommaert ==
The elder Mommaert began his printing business in Brussels in 1585, his first known publication being the terms of the city's surrender to Alexander Farnese, Duke of Parma: Articulen ende conditien vanden tractate aengegaen ende ghesloten tusschen die Prince van Parma ende de stadt van Bruessele.

In 1594 he printed a brief but richly illustrated account of the festive reception in Brussels of the new governor general, Archduke Ernest of Austria: Descriptio et explicatio pegmatum, arcuum et spectaculorum, quae Bruxellae Brabantiae pridie calendas februarii anno MDXCIIII exhibita fuere, sub ingressum serenissimi principis Ernesti (available on Google Books).

His shop was called simply De Druckerye ("The printing shop") and stood in the Stoofstraat behind Brussels Town Hall. Much of his printing was of the decrees of the city council.

His printing mark was a hooded falcon with the motto Post tenebras spero lucem (After darkness I hope for light).

== Widow of Jan Mommaert ==
After Jan Mommaert the elder's death, probably in 1627, Martine van Straeten continued the family business under the name "Widow of Jan Mommaert". In 1631 she was in trouble with the authorities for publishing papal bulls without government permission, but she was pardoned on 16 September 1631.

In 1635 she printed the news pamphlet Nieuwe tydinghen uyt verscheyden quartieren van Europa, ghekomen tot Brussel tzedert den 18. tot den 23. Julii 1635 (New tidings from various parts of Europe, come to Brussels since the 18 to 23 July 1635), which might be an issue of an otherwise lost newspaper.

== Jan (II) Mommaert ==
The younger Jan Mommaert (1611–1669) was not only a printer but also a poet. He produced a much reprinted compilation of amorous, pastoral and burlesque lyrics, some of them his own work, under the title Het Brabands nachtegaelken (first edition 1650). His other poetic works are Stichtelyck ende vermakelyck proces (1658) and Den Christelycken dagh (1658).

He served terms on the city council in 1654, 1660 and 1666.

== Publications ==
=== Jan (I) Mommaert ===
- 1585: Articulen ende conditien vanden tractate aengegaen ende ghesloten tusschen die Prince van Parma ende de stadt van Bruessele
- 1594: Descriptio et explicatio pegmatum, arcuum et spectaculorum, quae Bruxellae Brabantiae pridie calendas februarii anno MDXCIIII exhibita fuere, sub ingressum serenissimi principis Ernesti, Dei gratia archiducis Austriae Available on Google Books
- 1594: Maximilien de Vignacourt, Serenissimi Ernesti adventum gratulatur Belgicae Maxaemyliani V
- 1596: Relation de ce que s'est exhibé en la ville de Bruxelles à l'entree du serenissime prince Albert, archiduc d'Austrice
- 1597: Jean Scohier, L'estat et comportement des armes
  - Second edition 1629
- 1599: Philip Numan, Panegyricus in adventum Alberti et Isabellae in civitate Bruxellensem
- 1600: Mateo Alemán, Primera parte de la vida del picaro Guzman de Alfarache
- 1600: States of Brabant, Instructie ghemaeckt by mijne heeren Staeten van Brabandt, achtervolghende der welcker men tellen sal allen de heerden van allen de schouwen
- 1606:
  - Jean-Baptiste Gramaye, Gallo-Brabantia
  - J.-B. Gramaye, Bruxella cum suo comitatu
  - J.-B. Gramaye, Thenae et Brabantia ultra velpam quae olim Hasbaniae pars
  - J.-B. Gramaye, Arscotum Ducatus cum suis Baronatibus
- 1610:
  - J.-B. Gramaye, Antverpiae antiquitates
  - J.-B. Gramaye, Antiquitates illustrissimi ducatus Brabantiae
- 1614: Andres de Soto, Het leven van den heyligen Joseph, bruydegom onser Liever Vrouwen, translated by Franciscus Vanden Broecke
- 1629: J. A. Cools, Geestelycke Herders-dichten, behelsende Brusselsche Bee-vaert, Bethléem, Scherpenheuvel

=== Widow of Jan Mommaert ===
- 1629: Jean Scohier, L'estat et comportement des armes (with a commendatory sonnet by Jan Mommaert the younger)
- 1630: Juste Damant, Manière universelle de fortifier
- 1635: Nieuwe tydinghen uyt verscheyden quartieren van Europa, ghekomen tot Brussel tzedert den 18. tot den 23. Julii 1635.
- 1636: Eberhard Wassenberg, Scherp sinnighe Neep-Dichten (with a commendatory verse by Jan Mommaert the younger)

=== Jan (II) Mommaert ===
- 1646: Erycius Puteanus, Bruxella septenaria
- 1647: Pedro Calderón de la Barca, Het leven is maer droom (a Dutch translation of Life Is a Dream)
- 1650:
  - Jan Mommaert, Het Brabandts nachtegaelken
  - Bernardinus Surius, Den godtvruchtighen pelgrim ofte Jerusalemsche reyse
- 1656: Emanuel d'Aranda, Relation de la captivité et liberté du sieur Emanuel de Aranda, mené esclave à Alger en l'an 1640, et mis en liberté l'an 1642
- 1657: Jacques de Condé (ed.), Costuymen ende rechten der stadt Brussel
- 1660: César Oudin, Tesoro de las dos lenguas, española y francesa (corrected edition)
