= Caesar Joachim Trognaesius =

Belgian printer-bookseller and type designer

- César Trogney
- Born: 1590
- Died: unknown
- Occupations: printer and bookseller
- Years active: 1624–1645
- Era: handpress
- Parent(s): Joachim Trognaesius and Livine de Pickere

Caesar Joachim Trognaesius or Troigney (born 1590) was a 17th-century printer-bookseller and calligraphic type designer.

== Life ==
Caesar Joachim continued the bookshop and printing business of his father, Joachim Trognaesius, on the churchyard of Antwerp Cathedral. His date of death is unknown.

Calligraphic type of his design was demonstrated in Nouvel A. B. C., published by Arnold van Brakel in Antwerp in 1671.

== Publications ==
- Willem Marcquis, Decas pestifuga seu decem quaestiones problematicae de peste, unà cum exactissima instructione purgandarum aedium infectarum (1627) – a treatise on the pestilence. Available on Google Books
- Juan Francisco Rodriguez, Nieuwen dictionaris om te leeren de Nederlandtsche ende Spaensche talen: met groote neerstigheydt by een vergadert ende ghestelt met de nomina, genera, verba ende eenighe coniugatien (1634) – A Dutch-Spanish dictionary and grammar. Available on Google Books
- Lazarus Marcquis, Volcomen tractaet van de peste (1636) – a treatise on the pestilence. Available on the Internet Archive
- Arnold de la Porte, Compendio de la lengua española. Institutie vande Spaensche tale (1637), dedicated to Johannes Chrysostomus vander Sterre. Available on Google Books
- Aubertus Miraeus, Regulae et Constitutiones Clericorum in Congregatione viventium (1638) – Various rules for clergy living in community Available on Google Books
- Caesar Joachim Trognaesius, El Grande dictionario y thesoro de las tres lenguas Española, Francesa y Flamenca con todos los nombres de los Reynos, ciudades y lugares del mundo. Le Grand Dictionnaire et Tresor de trois langues, François, Flameng et Espaignol, avec tous les noms des Royaumes, Villes et lieux du Monde. Den grooten Dictionaris ende Schat van dry talen, Duytsch, Spaensch ende Fransch, met de namen der Rijcken, Steden ende plaetsen der wereldt (1639; reprinted 1642) – a three-language dictionary, thesaurus and gazetteer compiled from the work of Cornelis Kiliaan, César Oudin, Juan Francisco Rodriguez, and others. Available on Google Books
- Jean-Jacques Courvoisier, Le prince immortel tiré sur la vie et la fin glorieuse de S.A.R. Don Ferdinand d'Autriche, Infant d'Espagne (1642) – a eulogy of the Cardinal-Infante Ferdinand of Austria
- Jean-Jacques Courvoisier, Les oeuvres spirituelles (3 vols., 1644-1645)
