= Pierre Parisot (humanist) =

17th-century educator from Luxembourg

Pierre Parisot (active 1623–1657) was a 17th-century educator from the Duchy of Luxembourg, who taught French at the Old University of Leuven.

Parisot studied at Pig College, Leuven, under Nicolaus Vernulaeus. After graduating, he went on to teach French at the college until 1657. While teaching he wrote a grammar textbook for his students, Linguae Gallicae Institutiones (Leuven, Jean Olivier, 1628), which went through several reprints.
