= Johannes Wiggers =

16th century Dutch Theologian

Professor Johannes Wiggers S.T.D.
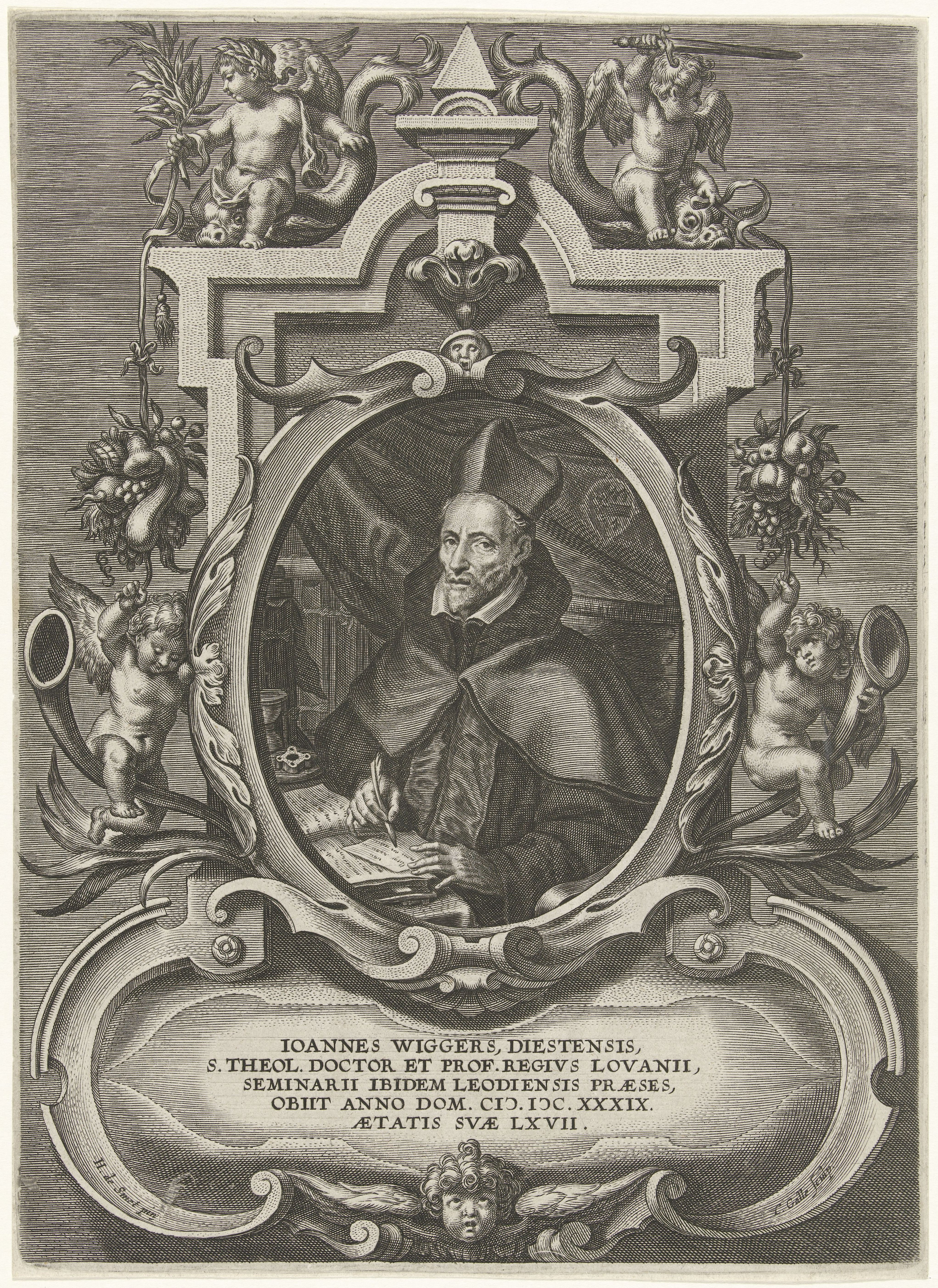
- Portrait engraved by Cornelis Galle the Younger
- Born: December 27, 1571; Diest, Duchy of Brabant, Habsburg Netherlands
- Died: March 29, 1639 (aged 67); Leuven, Duchy of Brabant, Habsburg Netherlands
- Parent(s): Aert Wiggers, Elisabeth Typpoel

Academic background
- Education: Leuven University
- Thesis: (1607)

Academic work
- Era: Tridentine Catholicism
- Discipline: Theology
- Sub-discipline: Thomistic scholasticism
- Institutions: Diocesan Seminary of Liège; Liège College, Leuven

Johannes Wiggers (1571–1639) was a theologian from the Duchy of Brabant in the Habsburg Netherlands.

== Life ==
Johannes was born in Diest on 27 December 1571, the sixth of eight children of Aert Wiggers and Elisabeth Typpoel. He became a subdeacon in 1595, and was ordained deacon and priest in 1596. In 1600 he graduated Master of Arts from the University of Leuven, going on to study theology at Pope's College, while teaching philosophy at Lily College. From 1604 to 1609 he was a professor at the Diocesan Seminary of Liège, meanwhile graduating Bachelor of Divinity in 1605 and Doctor of Sacred Theology in 1607.

Returning to Leuven in 1609, Wiggers was president of Arras College (1609-1611) and Liège College (1611–1639). On 13 October 1611 he became Regius Professor of Scholastic Theology, and as such a canon of St Peter's Church in Leuven. He also served various terms as rector of the university and dean of the Faculty of Theology. In academic politics and theological disputes he was an ally of Cornelius Jansen.

In 1628 Wiggers founded the Convent of Bethlehem within the Great Beguinage in Leuven, for six relatives who wished to become beguines.

He died in Leuven on 29 March 1639, his bequests establishing two scholarships at Lily College.

== Publications ==
- Commentaria in primam secundae Divi Thomae Aquinatis (Leuven, Johannes Oliverius and Cornelius Coenesteyn, 1630; reprinted 1634, 1652, 1689, 1701)
- Commentaria de vitutuibus theologicis, fide, spe, charitate (Leuven, Johannes Oliverius and Cornelius Coenesteyn, 1630; reprinted 1645, 1656, 1689)
- In tertiam partem D. Thomae Aquinatis commentaria (Leuven, Joannes Oliverius and Cornelis Coenesteyn, 1631; reprinted 1643, 1654, 1657, 1704)

A number of other works were published posthumously by the efforts of his nephew, Cornelius Wiggers.
