= Jean-Jacques Courvoisier =

Jean-Jacques Courvoisier (died 1652) was a Minim Friar from the County of Burgundy and a spiritual author in the Spanish Netherlands.

== Life ==
Courvoisier may have been born in Mons. He entered the Minims in Burgundy but was transferred to the Low Countries in 1617 when a new province of the order was established there. He served as head of the Belgian province from 1635 to 1638. On 21 June 1644 the general chapter divided the Belgian province into Flemish and Walloon provinces, with the houses of Antwerp, Brussels, Geraardsbergen and Leuven going to the one, and Anderlecht, Douai, Liège, Lille and Mons to the other. Couvoisier served as head of the Walloon province from September 1650 until his death, in Anderlecht, on 1 April 1652.

== Writings ==
- Extases de la princesse du midi la belle Malceda, au palais du sage roi Salomon (Brussels, Jean Pepermans, 1632)
- Le Sacré Mausolée, ou les Parfums exhalants du tombeau de la sérénissime princesse Isabelle Claire Eugénie, figuré sur le sépulchre du roy David (Brussels, François Vivien, 1634)
- Le pédagogue angélique (Brussels, Lucas van Meerbeeck, 1636)
- Le lys divin et le Samson mystique ou sont representez les amours de Samson avec Dalile, en paralleles des amours de Jesus avec son Eglise (Brussels, Godefroy Schoevaerts, 1638)
- L'Austriche saincte, ou l'Idée du vrai prélat, tirée de la vie parfaite et innocente de S. Maximilian, apôtre et patron de l'Autriche (Brussels, Godefroy Schoevaerts, 1638)
- Obelisque sepulchral érigé en l'église de Renaix à la mémoire immortelle de tres-illustre, hault et puissant seigneur, Messire Jean Comte de Nassau (Brussels, Godrefroy Schoevaerts, 1639)
- Le Prince immortel, tiré sur la vie & la fin glorieuse de son Altesse Royale Don Ferdinand d'Austriche, Infant d'Espagne, Cardinal (Antwerp, Caesar Joachim Trognaesius, 1642)
- Le Throsne royal de Jésus Nazaréen, roi des affligés (Antwerp, Caesar Joachim Trognaesius, 1642)
- Les oeuvres spirituelles (3 vols., Brussels, Godefroy Schoevarts, 1645)
- Le sacré bocage de nostre dame de Boisleduc (Brussels, Godefroy Schoevaerts, 1646)
- Maximes du Royaume de Iesus, Roy des Roys : tirées des reigles & escrits, des principaux patriarches & fondateurs des ordres religieux (Brussels, Guillaume Scheybels, 1648)
