= Infante of Spain =

Royal title for non-heir children of Spanish monarchs

- Heraldic crown of infantes

Infante of Spain (feminine infanta; Spanish: infante de España; f. infanta) is a royal title granted at birth to the children of reigning and past Spanish monarchs, and to the children of the heir to the Crown. Individuals holding the title of infante also enjoy the style of Royal Highness.

Unlike other European monarchies, in Spain only the heir to the Crown is a prince or princess, holding the title of Prince or Princess of Asturias, along with other traditional titles. By tradition, all other children of the Spanish monarch and that of the Prince or Princess of Asturias are titled infantes.

Among other privileges, the infantes have the right to be buried in the Pantheon of Infantes in El Escorial. The children of infantes bear the style of The Most Excellent (excelentísimo/a señor(a)) and are considered grandees of Spain.

The consorts of the Infantas Margarita, Duchess of Soria, and Cristina (Carlos Zurita and Iñaki Urdangarin, respectively) are not infantes, but they receive the style of The Most Excellent; furthermore, the former can use the title of Duke of Soria jure uxoris as long as he is her consort or remains a widower.

Spanish law allows the monarch to grant the title and style of infante by royal decree in exceptional circumstances outside of the above mentioned cases to people that prove to be specially worthy (they are then called infantes by grace). This title was for example granted to Carlos de Borbón, Duke of Calabria, pretender to the throne of the Two Sicilies and cousin of King Juan Carlos I.

== History ==
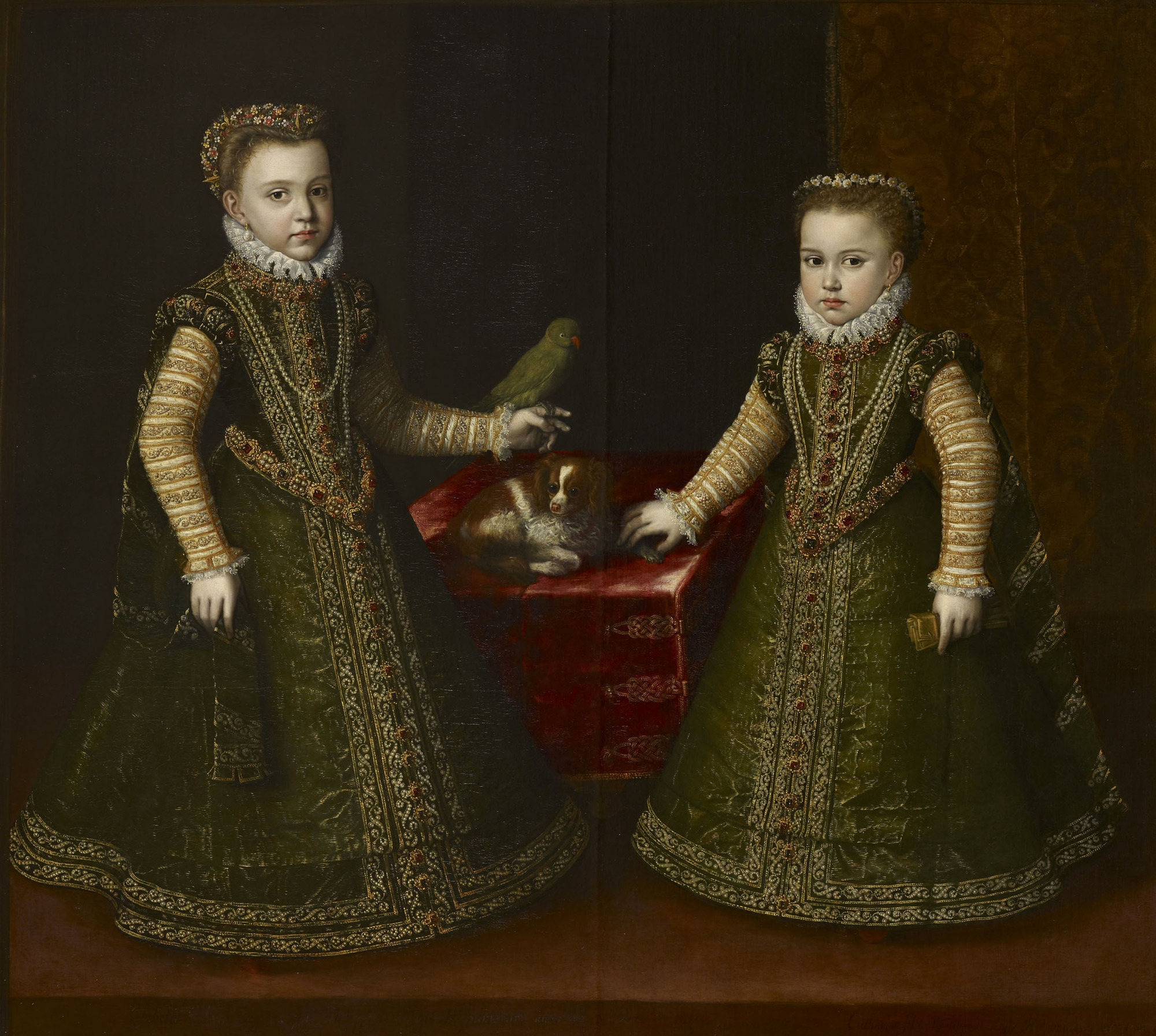
The Infantas Isabel Clara Eugenia and Catalina Micaela; daughters of King Philip II of Spain and the Indies (by Sofonisba Anguissola circa 1570)

In the medieval Spanish monarchies, whether Castilian, Leonese, Navarran or Aragonese, all sons and daughters of the monarchs, including the firstborns, were infantes. However, at the end of the 14th century, King John I of Castile, son and successor of Henry II of Castile, when marrying his first born son, the Infante Enrique – future Henry III – with Catherine of Lancaster, granddaughter of the dethroned and executed Peter of Castile, created the title of Prince of Asturias for the couple. This title was then passed to the successive heirs, no matter if they were males or females. By birth, the firstborns of the kings had the title of infante like their brothers and sisters, but when they were proclaimed as heirs before the Cortes, they then became Princes of Asturias.

The same happened in Navarre, when Charles III created for his grandson, the Infante Carlos, son of his daughter Blanca and the future John II of Aragon, the title of Prince of Viana, with the idea that this title should be passed to the heirs of the Crown of Navarre. But when Navarre was conquered by Ferdinand II of Aragon in 1512, the title of the heir of Navarre was assumed by the heir of Castile and Aragon, even thought the exiled Albret family continued using the title for their heirs.

== Regulation ==
The title of infante is legally regulated by Royal Decree 1368/1987, of 6 November, on the regime of titles, styles and honours of the Royal Family and the Regents:

1. The children of the King who do not have the status of Prince or Princess of Asturias and the children of the said Prince or Princess are Infantes of Spain and receive the style of Royal Highness. Their consorts, as long as they remain as such or as widowers, have the style and honours that the King graciously grants them according to the provisions of article 62, section f) of the Constitution.
2. Also, the King can grant the dignity of Infante and the style of Highness to the persons that he judges worthy of this honours by the existence of exceptional circumstances.
3. Apart from what is provided for in this section and in the previous one, and with the exception of what is provided for in article 5 for the members of the Regency, no person may:
a) Be titled Prince or Princess of Asturias or bear any other title traditionally linked to the heir of the Crown.
b) Be titled Infante of Spain.
c) Receive the styles and honours that belong to the dignities of sections a) and b).

== Current infantes of Spain ==
Open heraldic crown of an infante

There are currently only female infantas. The last male infante was Infante Carlos, Duke of Calabria. According to Spanish law, the current infantes of Spain are:

- Sofía de Borbón y Ortiz, younger daughter of King Felipe VI.
- Elena de Borbón y de Grecia, Duchess of Lugo, first daughter of King Juan Carlos I and sister of King Felipe VI.
- Cristina de Borbón y de Grecia, younger daughter of King Juan Carlos I and sister of King Felipe VI.
- Margarita de Borbón y Borbón, Duchess of Soria and Hernani, younger daughter of the Count of Barcelona and aunt of King Felipe VI.

== See also ==
- Pavane pour une infante défunte by Maurice Ravel
