= Erycius Puteanus =

Dutch humanist and philologist (1574–1646)

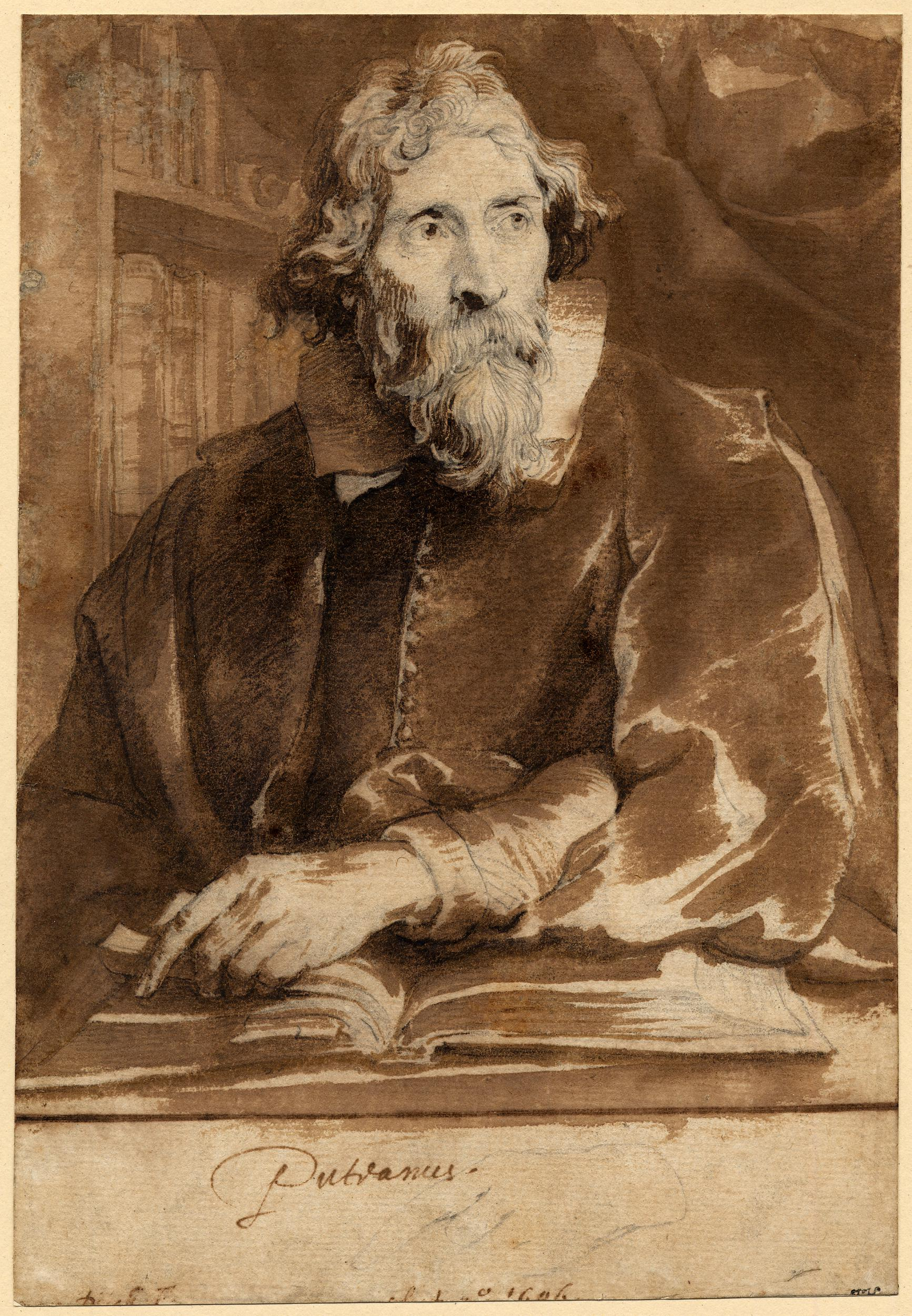
Chalk drawing of Erycius Puteanus by Anthony van Dyck

Erycius Puteanus (4 November 1574 – 17 September 1646) was a humanist and philologist from the Low Countries.

== Name ==
Erycius Puteanus is a latinization of his name, which was rendered in various ways, including Hendrick van den Putte (Put, Putten), Errijck (Eryck, Eerryck) de Put or Eric van der Putte. This was also Latinized as Ericus Puteanus. He was also known as Henry du Puy.

== Life ==
He was born in Venlo and studied at the schools of Dordrecht and Cologne (College of the Three Crowns), where he took the degree of Master of Arts, 28 February 1595. He then followed, at Leuven, the lectures on ancient history given by Justus Lipsius.

In 1597, he travelled to Italy and met scholars, especially Cardinal Federigo Borromeo, through whom he was appointed professor of Latin at the Palatine School of Milan from 1600 to 1606. Then the States of Brabant offered him the chair left vacant by Lipsius at Leuven.

He taught at the Collegium Trilingue at the University of Leuven for forty years. He was loaded with favours by reigning princes: the Archduke Albert appointed him his honorary counsellor (1612), and increased his annual pension by 200 ducats (1614), adding the reversion of Château-César. At the same time he filled, after 1603, the post of historiographer to Philip III of Spain, on behalf of the Milanese, with other appointments. His outspoken language provoked political animosities, and he was almost driven into exile by request of King James I of England, who wrongly believed him to be the author of Corona Regia (1615), a scandalous satire about James's parentage and behaviour.

He fathered 17 children, and died in Leuven.

== Work ==
Puteanus was an encyclopedist; in one period of his literary activity (1603–19), he detached himself from Lipsius by aiming at personal leadership of a school. He then went back to chronological works. As a philologist some of his dissertations were reproduced in the Thesauri of Grævius and Gronovius.

Among his more than 90 works is a treatise on music, Modulata Pallas, which also appeared in four later substantially altered adaptations. One of these is Iter Nonianum, which was a comprehensive scholarly study of music theory. One distinctive feature is his extension of the Guidonian hexachord (ut, re, mi, fa, sol, la) with a seventh note bi, accompanied by a justifying cosmological and numerological emphasis on the number seven.

Puteanus provided advice about naming features on the first telescopic lunar map produced by his friend Michael van Langren (1598–1675). Van Langren named two features after him, the Aestuaria Bamelrodia and the crater Puteani.

20 digitalized works can be consulted via KU Leuven Special Collections among them: Historiæ Belgicæ liber singvlaris, de obsidione Lovaniensi anni MDCXXXV (Antwerpen, 1636).

== Editions ==
For the history of the numerous writings and editions of Erycius Puteanus see

- Roersch and Vanderhaegen in Bibliotheca Belgica (1904–5), nos. 166, 167, 168, 171
- Alphonse Roersch in Biographie Nationale de Belgique, vol. 18 (1904), coll. 329–344.
- Simar, Etude sur Erycius Puteanus (Louvain, 1909)
- Saverio Campanini, Die Diatriba de anagrammatismo des Erycius Puteanus. Schöpfung und Erschöpfung einer barocken Leidenschaft, in A. Eusterschulte – W.-M. Stock (Hrsg.), Zur Erscheinung kommen. Bildlichkeit als theoretischer Prozess, Sonderheft der "Zeitschrift für Ästhetik und Allgemeine Kunstwissenschaft" 14, Felix Meiner Verlag, Hamburg 2016, pp. 65–79
