= Ferdinand of Bavaria (bishop) =

Archbishop of Cologne

- Archbishop of Cologne
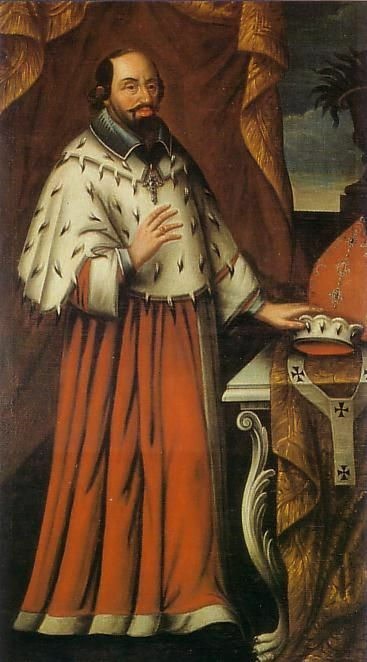
- Church: Roman Catholic Church
- Archdiocese: Cologne
- See: Cologne
- Appointed: 1612
- Term ended: 1650
- Predecessor: Ernest of Bavaria
- Successor: Maximilian Henry of Bavaria

Personal details
- Born: 7 October 1577 Munich, Holy Roman Empire
- Died: 13 September 1650 (aged 72) Arnsberg, Westphalia, Holy Roman Empire

Ferdinand of Bavaria (German: Ferdinand von Bayern) (7 October 1577 – 13 September 1650) was Prince-elector archbishop of the Archbishopric of Cologne (Holy Roman Empire) from 1612 to 1650, as successor of Ernest of Bavaria. He was also prince-bishop of Hildesheim, Liège, Münster, and Paderborn and Prince-Provost of Berchtesgaden.

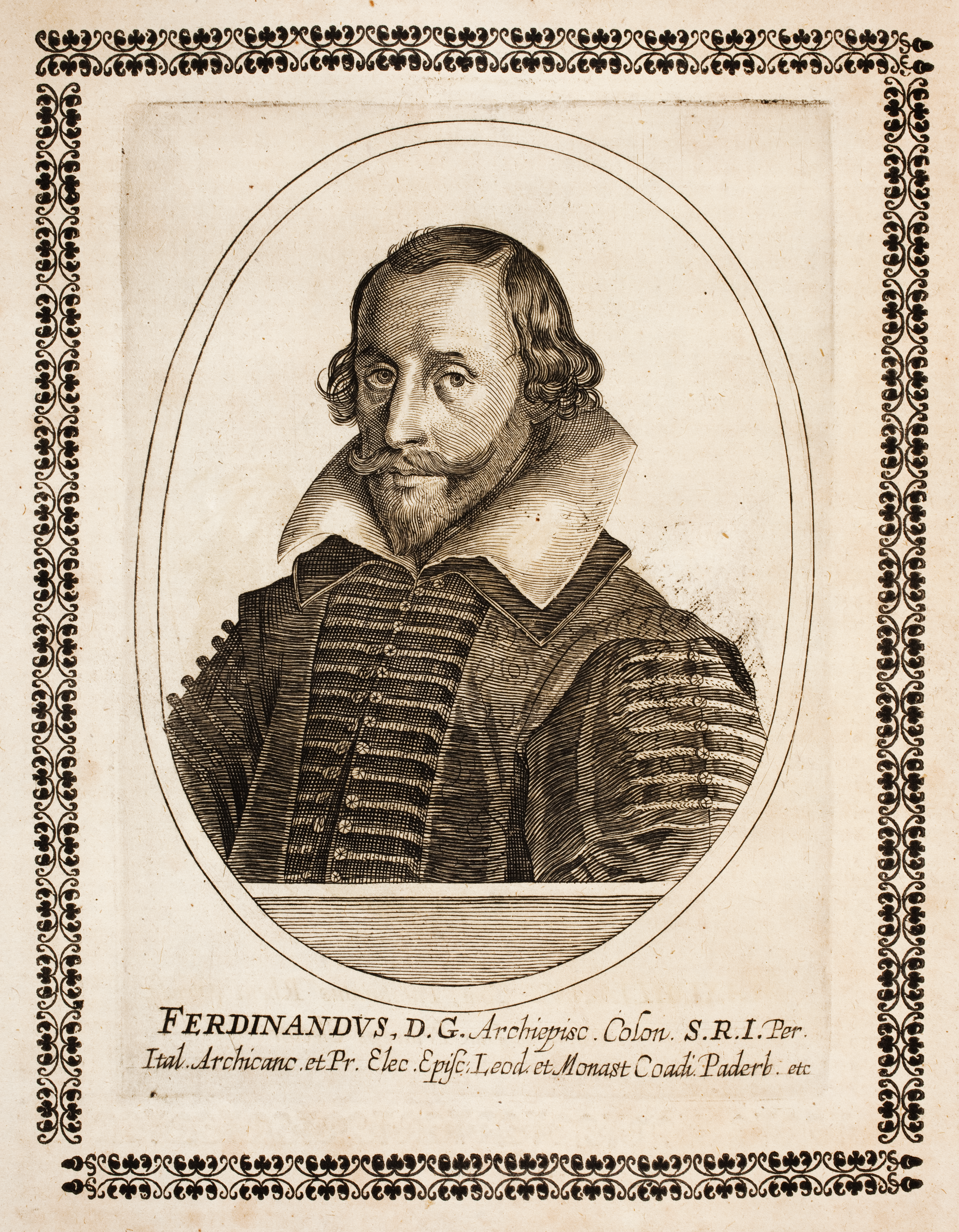
Engraving of Ferdinand of Bavaria

== Biography ==
Ferdinand was born in Munich, one of the sons of William V, Duke of Bavaria and Renata of Lorraine, a daughter of Francis I, Duke of Lorraine and granddaughter of Christian II of Denmark. He may have been named in honor of his paternal great-grandfather, Ferdinand I, Holy Roman Emperor.

His parents decided early that he would have a church life, and they sent him to the Jesuit College of Ingolstadt for education in early 1587. He quickly became a canon in Mainz, Cologne, Würzburg, Trier, Salzburg, and Passau. In 1595 he became Prince-Provost of Berchtesgaden and the coadjutor of his uncle Ernest of Bavaria. His uncle retired from most duties associated with his office, leaving Ferdinand to run the many lands he ruled. When Ernest died in 1612, Ferdinand was elected the Archbishop-Elector of Cologne and the Prince-Bishop of Liège, Hildesheim, Münster, and, from 1618, Paderborn. Ferdinand never received ordination, exercising princely rule but appointing auxiliary bishops to carry out his religious duties.

Ferdinand worked hard throughout his reign to promote Catholicism in his lands. He pushed reforms and adoption of the Council of Trent's objectives, and improved the position of the Wittelsbachs in Germany. In 1612 he attempted to get his brother Duke Maximilian I of Bavaria elected the Holy Roman Emperor, although Maximilian rejected the crown.

In 1618 the Thirty Years' War broke out. Ferdinand had initial success in supporting the Catholic leaders and keeping his dioceses safe from war with Spanish aid, although these lands were devastated after Sweden entered the war. By the end of the war, Swedish, Spanish, French and Imperial armies had all fought in and raided the bishoprics. In 1642 Ferdinand appointed his nephew Maximilian Henry coadjutor and he retired from most of the temporal affairs of the dioceses.

In the period of the persecution of witches (1435 – 1655) 37 people were executed in Cologne, mostly during Ferdinand's reign as Archbishop of Cologne. The most famous victim of his witch-hunt was Katharina Henot.

Ferdinand died in 1650 in the ducal Westphalian capital Arnsberg and was buried in Cologne Cathedral. He was succeeded by Maximilian Henry of Bavaria.

== Ancestors ==
Ancestors of Ferdinand of Bavaria (bishop)

16. Albert IV, Duke of Bavaria
8. William IV, Duke of Bavaria
17. Kunigunde of Austria
4. Albert V, Duke of Bavaria
18. Philip I, Margrave of Baden-Sponheim
9. Marie of Baden-Sponheim
19. Elisabeth of the Palatinate
2. William V, Duke of Bavaria
20. Philip I of Castile
10. Ferdinand I, Holy Roman Emperor
21. Joanna of Castile
5. Anna of Austria
22. Vladislaus II of Bohemia and Hungary
11. Anna of Bohemia and Hungary
23. Anna of Foix-Candale
1. Ferdinand of Bavaria
24. René II, Duke of Lorraine
12. Antoine, Duke of Lorraine
25. Philippa of Guelders
6. Francis I, Duke of Lorraine
26. Gilbert, Count of Montpensier
13. Renée of Bourbon-Montpensier
27. Chiara Gonzaga
3. Renata of Lorraine
28. Hans of Denmark
14. Christian II of Denmark
29. Christina of Saxony
7. Christina of Denmark
30. Philip I of Castile (=20)
15. Isabella of Austria
31. Joanna of Castile (=21)

Ferdinand of Bavaria House of Wittelsbach Born: 6 October 1577 in Munich Died: 13 September 1650 in Arnsberg
German royalty
Catholic Church titles
Regnal titles
Preceded by Ernest of Bavaria	Archbishop-Elector of Cologne^{1} and Duke of Westphalia; 1612–1650	Succeeded by Maximilian Henry of Bavaria
Preceded by Ernest of Bavaria	Prince-Bishop of Hildesheim^{1} 1612–1650	Succeeded by Maximilian Henry of Bavaria
Preceded by Ernest of Bavaria	Prince-Bishop of Liège^{1} 1612–1650	Succeeded by Maximilian Henry of Bavaria
Preceded by Ernest of Bavaria	Prince-Bishop of Münster^{1} 1612–1650	Succeeded by Bernhard von Galen
Preceded by Dietrich IV of Fürstenberg	Prince-Bishop of Paderborn^{1} 1618–1650	Succeeded by Dietrich Adolf of Recke
Notes and references
1. Catholic Administrator, due to lack of canonical qualification
