= Aubert Le Mire =

Belgian ecclesiastical historian

Aubertus Miraeus
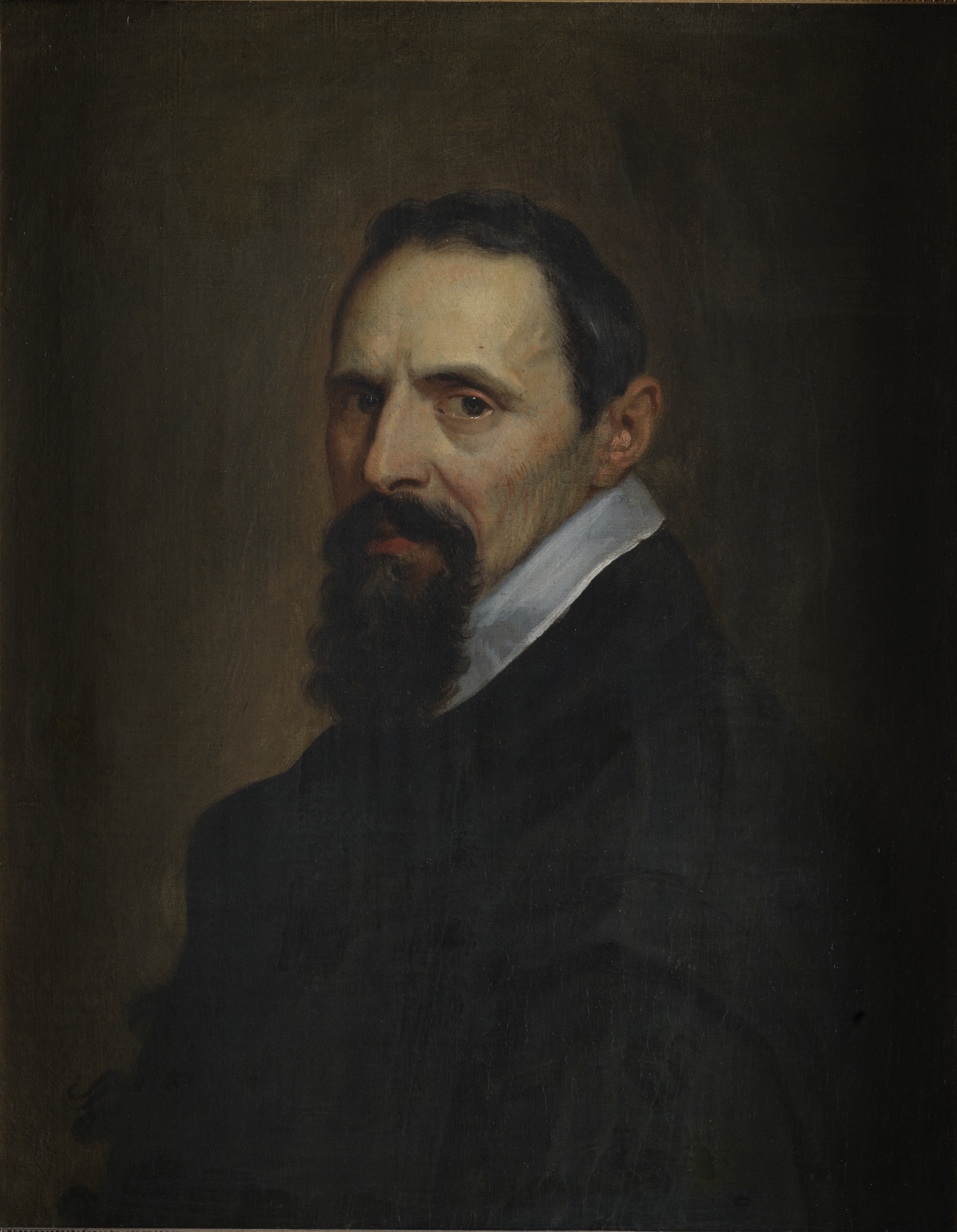
- Portrait of Albertus Miraeus by Erasmus Quellinus the Younger
- Born: 30 November 1573; City of Brussels
- Died: 19 October 1640 (aged 66); Antwerp
- Other name: Aubert le Mire
- Education: University of Leuven
- Occupation: ecclesiastical historian

Aubert le Mire, Latinized Aubertus Miraeus (30 November 1573 – 19 October 1640) was an ecclesiastical historian in the Spanish Netherlands.

== Life ==
Miraeus was born in Brussels. His father was Guillaume le Mire and his mother Joanna Speeckaert, sister to the Capuchin preacher Bonaventura Speeckaert. After studying at Douai and Leuven he was made canon of Antwerp cathedral in 1608 and secretary to his uncle, Joannes Miraeus, who was then Bishop of Antwerp. In 1611 he was appointed almoner and librarian to Archduke Albert of Austria, then sovereign of the Netherlands, and in 1624 he became dean of the cathedral of Antwerp and vicar general of the diocese. He remained in Antwerp until his death. He wrote numerous works in the fields of history, ecclesiastical history, and related disciplines. Some have suggested that his works lack thoroughness and accuracy.

== Published works ==
=== Obituaries, biographies and funeral orations ===
- Vita Justi Lipsii, Antwerp, 1609 (an obituary of Justus Lipsius, one of Miraeus's teachers at Louvain), dedicated to Jan Andrzej Próchnicki (1553–1633), bishop of Kamianets-Podilskyi 1607–1614 (Revised edition on Google Books)
- Gentis Spinulae illustrium elogia, Cologne, 1611 (a compendium on the Spinola family, in memory of Federico Spinola), dedicated to Ambrogio Spinola (on Google Books)
- Laudatio funebris Rudolphi II, Antwerp, 1612 (funeral oration for Rudolph II delivered in Antwerp Cathedral on 13 March 1612) – (on Google Books)
- De vita Alberti pii, sapientis, prudentis Belgarum principis commentarius, Antwerp, 1622 (an obituary for Albert VII, Archduke of Austria), dedicated to Philip IV of Spain (on Google Books)
- Serenissimae principis Isabellae Clarae Eugeniae Hispaniarum Infantis laudatio funebris, Antwerp, 1634 (a funeral oration for the Infanta Isabella Clara Eugenia), dedicated to the Cardinal-Infante Ferdinand of Austria (on Google Books)

=== History and ecclesiastical history ===
- Origines coenobiorum Benedictorum in Belgio, Antwerp, Hieronymus Verdussen, 1606 (on the origins of Benedictine monasticism in the Low Countries), dedicated to Nicolas Mainfroy, abbot of Saint-Bertin (on Google Books)
- Rerum toto orbe gestarum chronica a Christo nato ad haec usque tempora, Antwerp, Hieronymus Verdussen, 1608 (containing the chronicles of Eusebius, St. Jerome, Sigebert of Gembloux, Anselm of Gembloux, and others up to the year 1200, and a continuation of these chronicles by Miraeus up to 1608); dedicated to Joannes del Rio (on Google Books)
- Equitum redemtoris Jesu Christi ordo, Antwerp, Hieronymus Verdussen, 1608 (on the foundation of the Order of Knights of the Redeemer), dedicated to Vincenzo Gonzaga (on Google Books)
- Mathias Lambrecht, Historia Ecclesiastica. Oft een kerckelijcke historie, revised and updated by Miraeus (Antwerp, Hieronymus Verdussen, 1609) (on Google Books)
- Origines equestrium sive militarium ordinum libri duo, Antwerp, David Marten, 1609 (a volume on the origins of the military orders) (on Google Books)
  - published in French as Origine des chevaliers et ordres militaires, Antwerp, David Marten, 1609, dedicated to Gaston Spinola, count of Bruay (on Google Books);
- Politia ecclesiastica, sive de statu religionis Christianae per totum orbem, Cologne, 1609; Lyon, Antoine Hillepotte, 1620 (on Google Books)
- Ordinis carmelitani, ab Elia propheta primum incohati, ab Alberto patriarcha Ierusolymitano vitae regula temperati, a B. Teresia virgine Hispana ad primaevam disciplinam revocati, origo atque incrementa, Antwerp, David Marten, 1610 (on the origins and history of the Carmelite order), dedicated to Isabella Clara Eugenia, Infanta of Spain (on Google Books)
- Notitia episcopatuum orbis christiani, Antwerp, Plantin Press, 1611, 1613, dedicated to Guido Bentivoglio (on Google Books)
- Origines Benedictinae, Cologne, Bernardus Gualterus, 1614 (on the origins of Benedictine monasticism), dedicated to Philippus Caverellius, abbot of St Vaast (on Google Books)
- Canonicorum regularium ordinis S. Augustini origines ac progressus, Cologne, 1614 (a history of the Augustinian canons regular), dedicated to Remigius de Zaman, prior of Lo (on Google Books)
- De collegiis canonicorum, Cologne, 1615 (on colleges of canons), dedicated to Charles Philippe de Rodoan, bishop of Bruges (on Google Books)
- Geographia ecclesiastica, Lyon, 1620 (an alphabetic list of Catholic dioceses throughout the world), dedicated to Gaspard de Mornieu (on Google Books)
- De bello Bohemico Ferdinandi II. feliciter gesto Commentarius, Cologne, 1622 (a pro-Habsburg account of the Bohemian Revolt), dedicated to Lucio Sanseverino (on Google Books)
- Ordinis Praemonstratensis chronicon, Cologne, 1623 (chronicle of the Premonstratensian order), dedicated to Adrianus Stalpartius, abbot of Tongerlo Abbey (on Google Books)
- Originum monasticarum libri IV, Cologne, 1620 (on the origins of monastic orders), dedicated to Philippus Caverellius, abbot of St Vaast (on Google Books)
- De rebus Bohemicis liber singularis, Lyon, 1621 (an overview of Czech history), dedicated to Johann Lohel (on Google Books)
- Rerum Belgicarum Annales, Brussels, 1624, dedicated to Alexander I de Bournonville (on Google Books)
- Notitia ecclesiarum Belgii, Antwerp, 1630, dedicated to Philip IV of Spain (on google books); (this work, together with other works of Miraeus on the ecclesiastical history of the Netherlands, was re-edited by Johannes Franciscus Foppens, under the title of Miraei opera diplomatica et Historica, 4 vols., Brussels, 1723–48)
- De congregationibus clericorum in communi viventium, Cologne, 1632 (a history of the origins of congregations of clerks regular, such as the Theatines, Jesuits, Barnabites, Oratorians, etc.), dedicated to Nicolaus Albertus de Oleksow Gniewosz envoy to the court of the Infanta Isabella Clara Eugenia of Spain and later bishop of Kujawy (on Google Books)
- Rerum Belgicarum chronicon, Antwerp, Willem Lesteens, 1636 (a chronicle of the history of the Low Countries from 58 BC to AD 1635), dedicated to the Cardinal-Infante Ferdinand of Austria (on Google Books)

=== Bibliography and diplomatics ===
- Elogia Belgica sive illustrium Belgii scriptorum, Antwerp, 1609, dedicated to the city council of Antwerp (on Google Books)
- Elenchus historicorum et aliorum scriptorum, nondum typis editorum, qui in Belgicis potissimum bibliothecis manuscripti exstant, Brussels, 1622 (a handlist of authors of manuscripts in Belgian libraries) - (on Google Books)
- Codex donationum piarum, Brussels, 1624 (an anthology of medieval dotations), dedicated to Petrus Peckius (on Google Books)
- Diplomatum Belgicorum libri duo, Brussels, 1628 (a collection of diplomatics), dedicated to Cardinal de la Cueva (on Google Books)
- Donationum Belgicarum libri II, Antwerp, 1629 (an anthology of medieval dotations), dedicated to Ferdinand de Boisschot (on Google Books)
- Bibliotheca ecclesiastica, 2 vols, Antwerp, 1639–49; a compilation of short sketches of ecclesiastical writers by Jerome, Gennadius of Massilia, Isidore of Seville, Ildefonsus, Honorius Augustodunensis, Sigebert of Gembloux, and Henry of Ghent, furnished with notes by Miraeus; dedicated to Gaspar de Guzmán, Count-Duke of Olivares (on Google Books)

=== Letters ===
Some of his letters were published by Burbure in Messager des Sciences Historiques de Belgique (1859)
