= Cnobbaert =

Cnobbaert is a surname. Notable people with the surname include:

- Joannes Cnobbaert (1590–1637), Flemish printer and publisher
- Michiel Cnobbaert, Flemish printer and publisher
