= Anthony of Burgundy =

Anthony of Burgundy or Antoine de Bourgogne (or similar) may refer to:

- Anthony, Duke of Brabant (1384–1415), Duke of Brabant, Lothier and Limburg
- Anthony, bastard of Burgundy (1421–1504), the illegitimate son of Philip III, Duke of Burgundy
  - Master of Anthony of Burgundy, a painter under the patronage of Antoine, bastard of Burgundy
- Antoine de Bourgogne (died 1657), a 17th-century clergyman
