= Castle of Westerlo =

Several castles in Belgium

On the territory of the municipality of Westerlo (Westerloo, using the old spelling) there are several castles.

== Castle of the Princes de Mérode ==
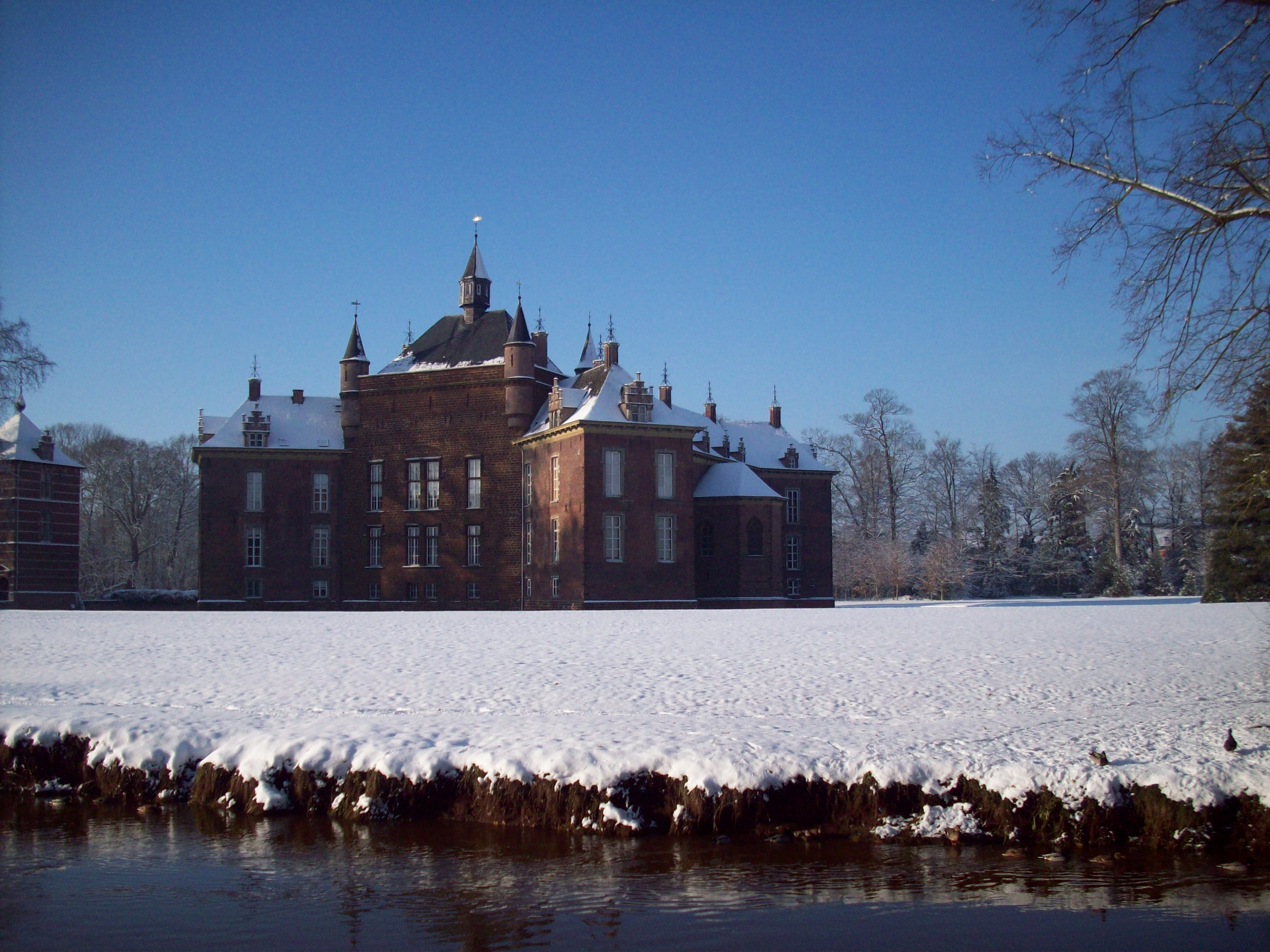
Castle of the Princes de Mérode seen from the southeast.

Locals call it "Oud Kasteel" (Old Castle) (51°05′02″N 4°55′02″E) to discern it from the new castle built for Jeanne de Merode in 1910-12 (see below). The castle has been the home of the House of Merode for more than five centuries. The central keep or Donjon has walls of more than 2 m thick. I was built by the lords of Wesemael in local brown stone in the late 14th century. It probably replaced an older fortress on the same spot. Other parts of the building are believed to date from the 15th and 16th century. The castle was adapted, extended and renovated several times. From the 16th century onwards it was transformed into a more luxurious noble dwelling and gradually lost its fortified character. Several restorations in the 19th century gave it back a more 'romantic' medieval appearance.

The sumptuous interiors contain fine furniture, paintings, tapestries, Córdoba leather wall hangings and objects collected by the Merode family throughout the centuries. The most important rooms like the entrance hall, the "ridderzaal" (knight's hall), the large drawing room, the dining room and the chapel can be visited during the 'Kasteelfeesten' in the first weekend of July.

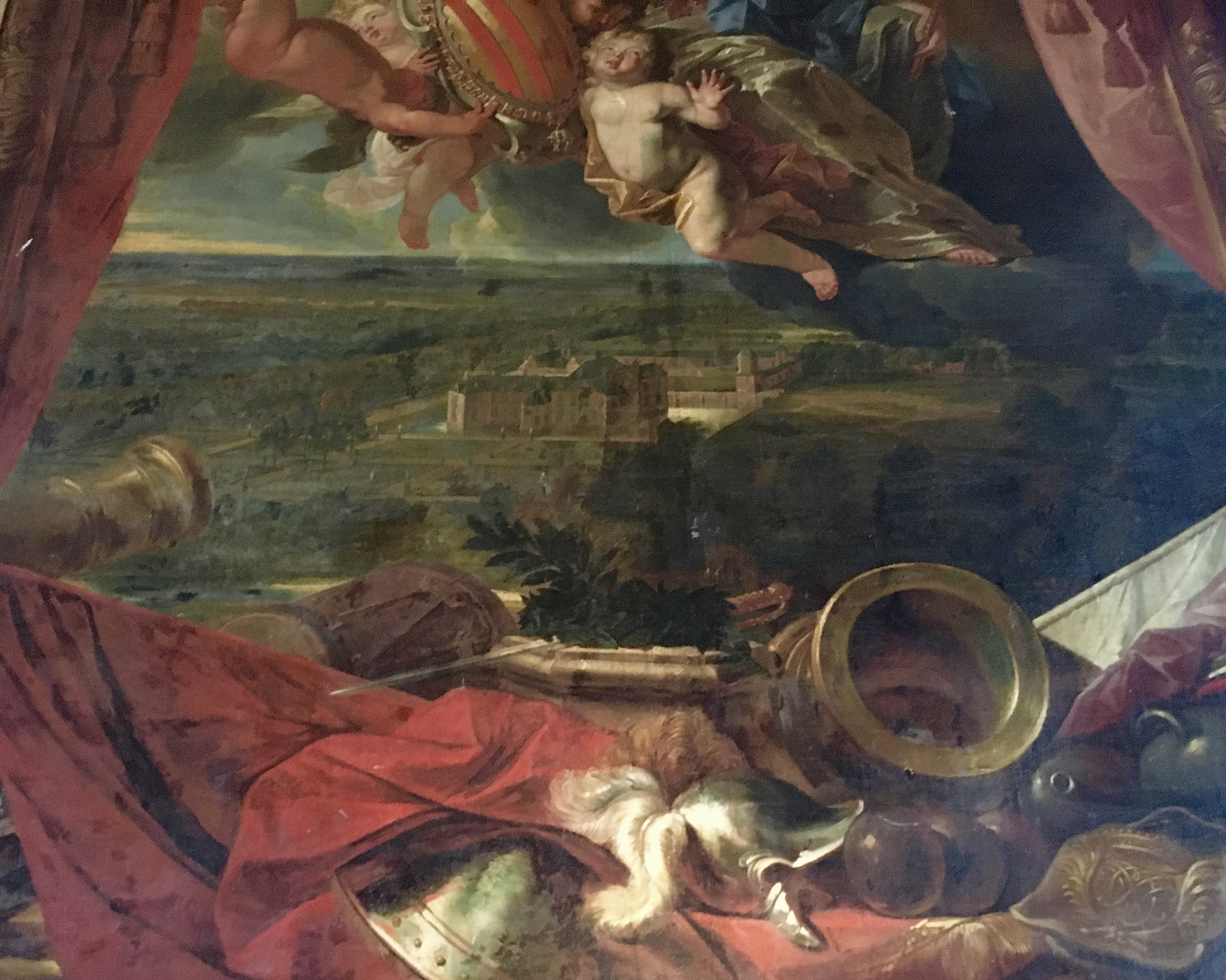
Castle of Westerlo and its grounds in the early 18th century as represented on a tapestry cartoon painted by Jan van Orley.

An English landscape park of 12 hectares surrounds the castle. The ponds in the park are connected with the moat of the castle. Across the Nete river there is a larger formal park (60 hectares) in the French tradition with a rectangular pond forming a large perspective. It was commissioned by Fieldmarshall Jean-Philippe-Eugène de Mérode-Westerloo at the beginning of the 18th century and was inspired by Versailles.

== Castle of Countess Jeanne de Mérode ==
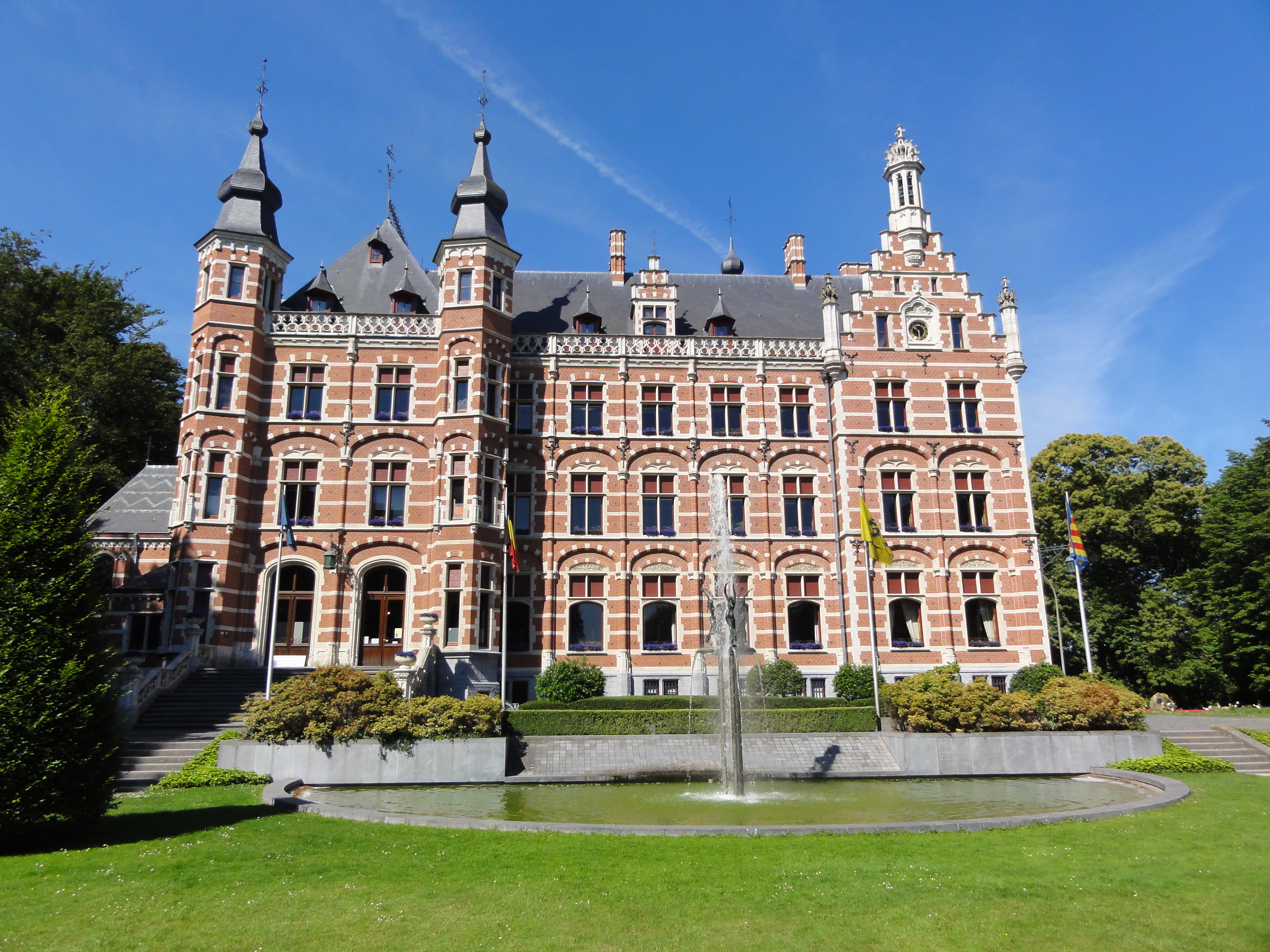
Castle of Countess Jeanne de Mérode.

Locals call it "Nieuw Kasteel" (New Castle) (51°05′25″N 4°54′44″E). It was built between 1909 and 1912 in a neogothic style by architect Pierre Langerock as the residence of one person, Countess Jeanne de Mérode. Jeanne de Mérode was born in Paris in 1853 as a daughter of Charles-Antoine Ghislain de Mérode-Westerloo, Marquess of Westerlo and Princess Marie-Nicolette d'Arenberg. She remained unmarried and devoted her life to religion and charitable works. To provide employment for the population of Westerlo (especially for young girls and women), she founded a carpet factory in Westerlo. She also financed a church, a school and a monastery in Heultje, and a home for the elderly in Westerlo. She lived with her parents and siblings in the 'old castle' until the death of her brother, Count Henri de Mérode, in 1908. At that time, she decided to move out. She planned to reside in the castle of Grimbergen, which she had inherited from her father. As she was very popular with the local population, the people of Westerlo begged her to stay in the region.

From 1909 onwards, the vast castle was constructed hardly a kilometre away from her paternal residence. The architecture of the facades was inspired by the early 16th-century late Gothic wing of the nearby abbey of Tongerlo. A more aristocratic appearance was achieved by adding four small and one large tower, as well as a bell tower in the form of a crown. Although both interior and exterior were executed in a historical style, the building contained many modern features that were very rare on the countryside at the beginning of the 20th century. The cross-beams supporting the roof were in steel, and the building had electric lighting, an electric elevator, central heating, running water, WCs and bathrooms.

As Jeanne de Mérode was very devout, the Castle also had its own private chapel. On the altar she kept her most important treasure, the famous Mérode Altarpiece by the 15th century painter Robert Campin. After her death, it was acquired from her heirs by the Metropolitan Museum in New York for the Cloisters collection.

When German troops invaded Belgium in 1940 the castle was confiscated and used as a local headquarters by the Nazis. Countess Jeanne moved back to the 'old castle' of Westerlo where she died on 1 July 1944, a few months before the liberation of Belgium. She left the castle to a monastic order of sisters. The building was used by the church as a home for retired priests until it was sold to the municipality of Westerlo in the 1970s. It has served as the Town Hall of Westerlo ever since.

== Castle of Baron de Trannoy ==
In nearby Tongerlo built during and after the First World War by a noble family. Now owned by the noble de Meeûs d'Argenteuil family. The name of the castle is now Castle de Meeûs d'Argenteuil.

== Castle of the Naets family ==
Built in the 1920s by a wealthy family of notaries and local administrators.

== See also ==
- List of castles in Belgium

== Sources ==
- Evrard Op de Beeck,Vijfhonderd jaar familie de Merode te Westerlo, Heemskring Ansfried, Westerlo, 1982.
- Henri Vannoppen, Het kasteel van Westerlo en de Prinsen de Merode, Heemskring Ansfried, Westerlo, 1989.
- Kris De Winter, Westerlo, land van Merode, Heemkring Ansfried, Westerlo, 2000.
