= Francis Wichmans =

Premonstratensian spiritual author

Augustinus Wichmans
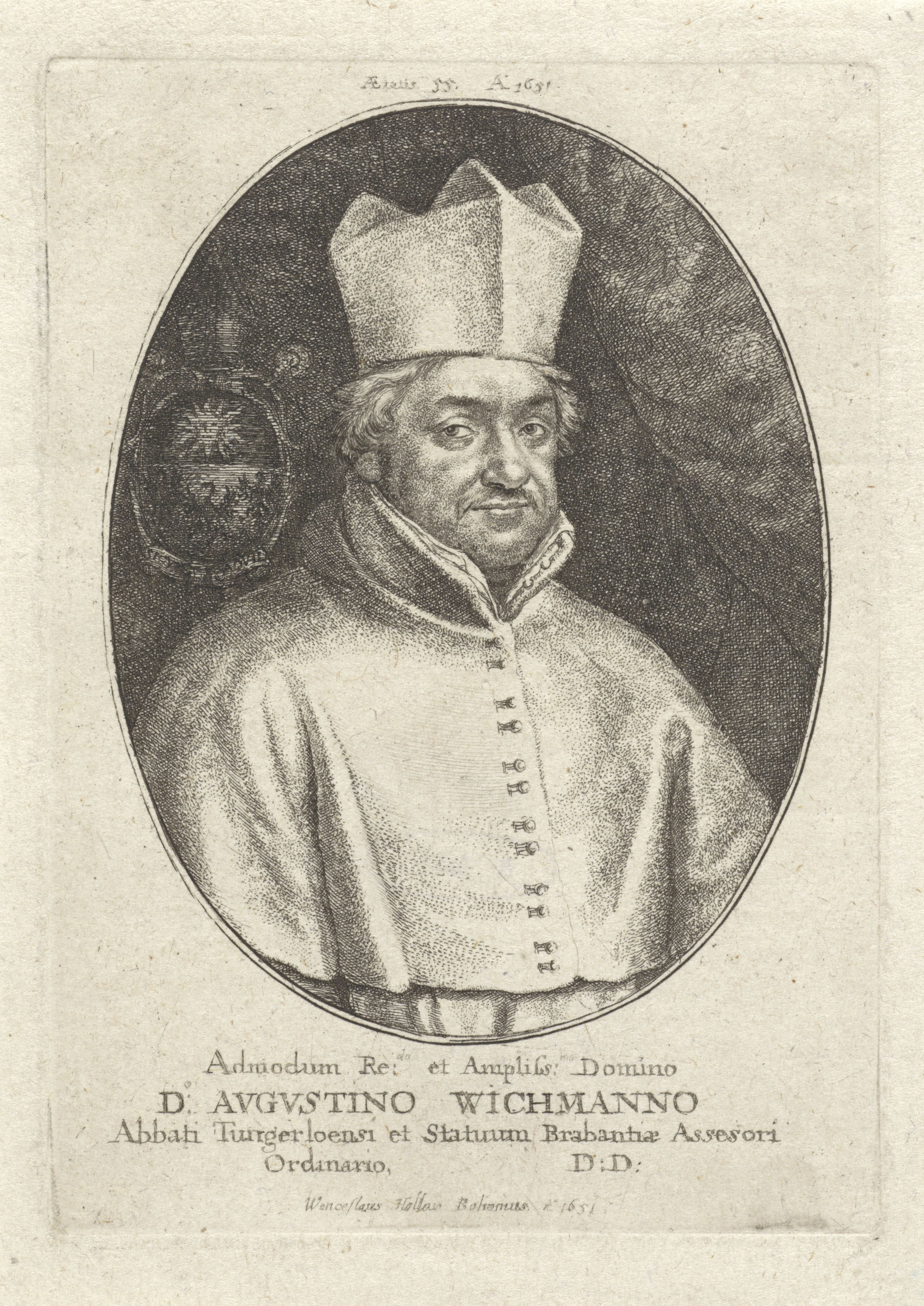
- Portrait by Wenceslaus Hollar, 1651
- Church: Tongerlo Abbey
- Elected: 1644

Orders
- Ordination: 4 March 1620
- Consecration: 9 July 1644

Personal details
- Born: Francis; 7 January 1596 Antwerp, Duchy of Brabant, Spanish Netherlands
- Died: 11 February 1661 (aged 65) Mechelen, Lordship of Mechelen, Spanish Netherlands
- Buried: Tongerlo Abbey
- Denomination: Roman Catholic
- Parents: Godewart Wijchmans and Catlijn van den Eynde
- Education: Leuven University
- Motto: Sicut aquila ("Like an Eagle")

Francis Wichmans (1596–1661), in religion Augustinus, was a Premonstratensian spiritual author, missionary, and abbot of Tongerlo Abbey. In the last capacity he sat in the First Estate of the States of Brabant.

== Life ==
Wichmans was born in Antwerp on 7 January 1596, son of Godewart Wijchmans and Catlijn van den Eynde, and was baptised in St. James' Church, Antwerp the same day. As a teenager he entered Tongerlo Abbey, being clothed in the habit on 21 September 1612 and taking the name in religion Augustinus. He made his profession on 22 September 1613, and was ordained priest 4 March 1620. On 14 February 1622 he matriculated at Leuven University, where he graduated Bachelor of Sacred Theology.

Recalled to the abbey, from 23 April 1628 he filled the offices of master of novices and circator. In 1630 he was made parish priest of Mierlo, and rural dean of Helmond. After the fall of 's-Hertogenbosch to the Dutch Republic in 1629, Bishop Michael Ophovius was obliged to leave his city, and resided at Geldrop, three miles from Mierlo. The bishop's diary shows that Ophovius conferred almost daily with Wichmans on the affairs of his diocese.

In 1632 Wichmans was transferred to the parish of Tilburg, in the same diocese, and was made rural dean of Hilvarenbeek. In 1634 the Retorsion laws were made, whereby Catholic priests were expelled, their churches confiscated and handed over to Protestant preachers. Wichmans resided at Alphen, a village just outside the boundaries and six miles from Tilburg. From this place he administered his parish, at the risk of his liberty and even his life, but in 1638–39 he was living in exile in Antwerp.

Wichmans was elected coadjutor to Abbot Verbraecken of Tongerlo on 1 July 1642 and installed on 11 January 1643. When Verbraecken died on 22 June 1644, Wichmans succeeded him as abbot, being installed by Johannes Chrysostomus vander Sterre on 9 July, and consecrated by bishop De Bergaigne of 's-Hertogenbosch. As motto he took Sicut aquila ("Like an Eagle"). As abbot of Tongerlo he sat in the States of Brabant, and in 1647 he was elected first member of the Standing Committee.

Wichmans promoted education in his abbey; in 1647 six of his religious graduated at Louvain, and a seventh in Rome. He erected or decorated several chapels in honour of the Blessed Virgin. In his final years much of his time was dedicating to repairs following a fire at the abbey on 27 April 1657. He rebuilt the church tower and had a carillon installed.

Wichmans died in Mechelen on 11 February 1661, and was buried in Tongerlo Abbey church.

== Works ==
- (under the pen name Joannes Baptista Wils), Epigrammata de viris sanctimonia illustribus ex Ordine Praemonstratensi (Leuven, Joannes Masius, 1615)
- Rosa candida et rubicunda (Antwerp, Hieronymus Verdussen, 1625), on the murder of Peter Janssens
- Apotheca spiritualium pharmacorum (Antwerp, Hieronymus Verdussen, 1626), on Google Books
- Sabbatismus Marianus (Antwerp, Gulielmus à Tungris, 1628), on Google Books
  - Dutch translation by Mattheus Willems, Den Saterdagh van Onse Lieve Vrouwe (Antwerp, 1633)
  - French translation by I. van Spilbeeck, Origine, utilité et pratique de la consécration du samedi de chaque semaine, à la Très-Sainte-Vierge (Namur, Brussels, Paris, 1890)
- Brabantia Mariana tripartita (Antwerp, Joannes Cnobbaert, 1632), on Google Books
