= Cornelius Hazart =

Flemish Jesuit (1617-1690)

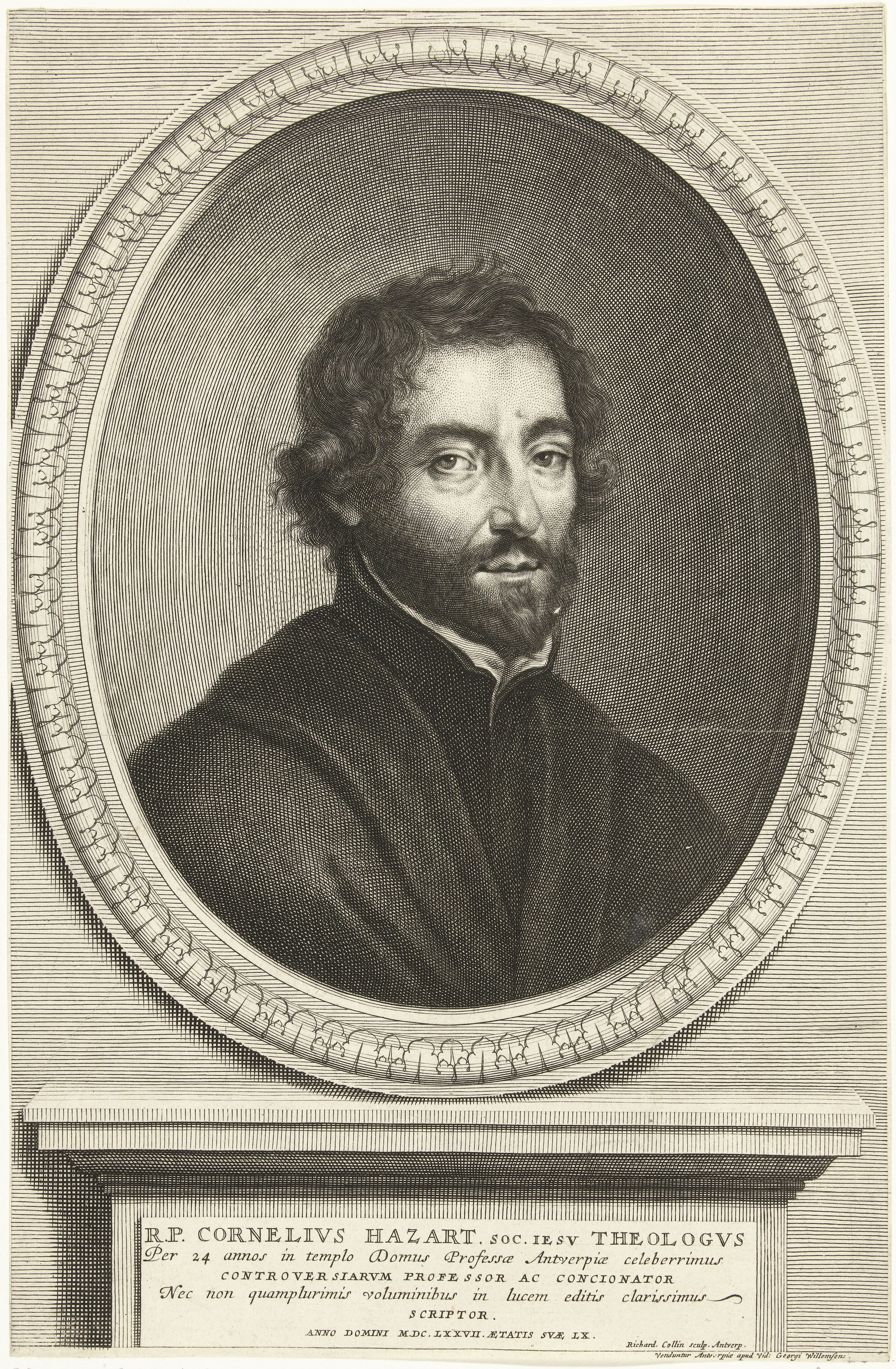
Cornelius Hazart

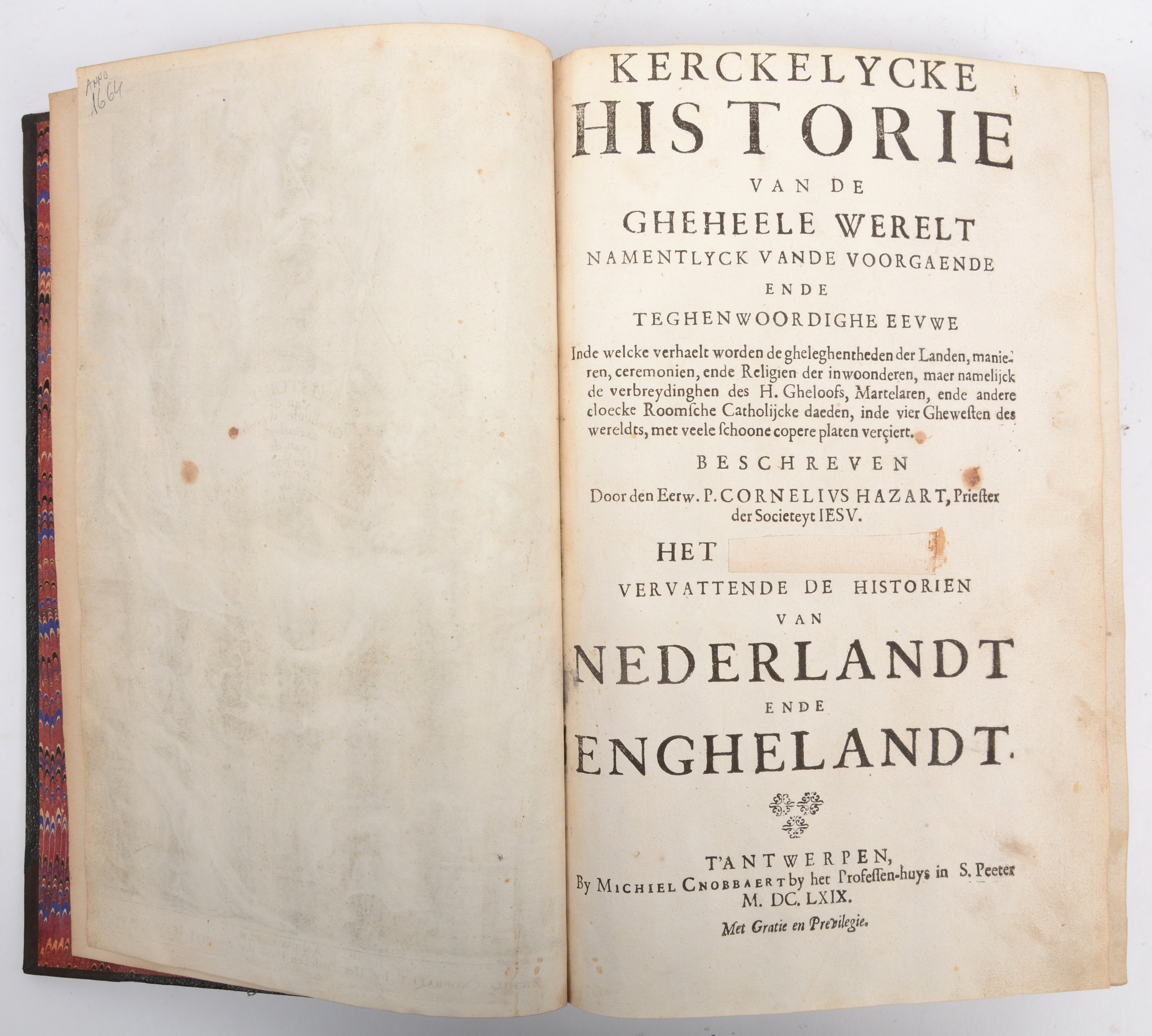
Title page of Hazart, Cornelius: Kerckelycke Historie vande Gheheele Wereldt, Michiel Cnobbaert, Antwerpen 1669.

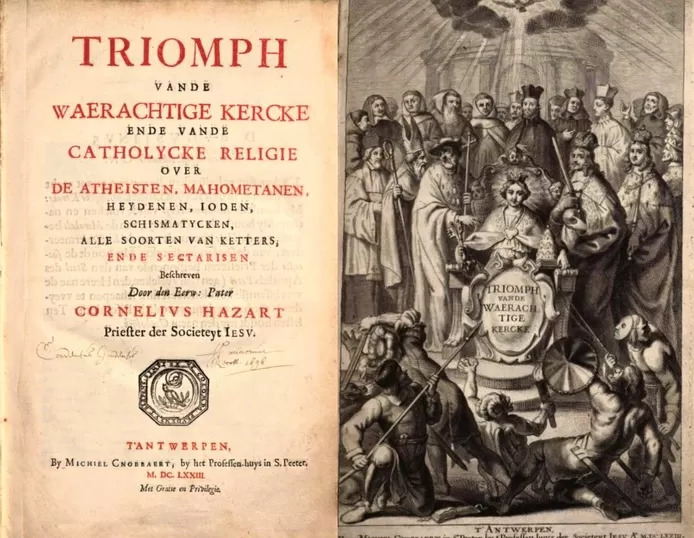
Title page of Hazart, Cornelius: Triomph vande waerachtige kercke ende vande catholycke religie, Antwerp 1673 with illustration by the printer and engraver Michiel Cnobbaert. Translated title: Triumph of the true church and of the catholic religion.

Cornelius Hazart (28 October 1617 – 25 October 1690) was a Flemish Jesuit priest, controversialist, orator and writer of polemical history.

== Life ==
Hazart was born at Oudenaarde in the County of Flanders. He entered the Society of Jesus on 24 September 1634 and was ordained priest, 6 April 1647, at Louvain, where he had already the reputation of perfectus orator.

He made his religious profession on 1 November 1651; and preached during a period of thirty-six years, for a time at Dunkirk and Brussels, then permanently at Antwerp, where he died.

Hazart's life, apart from the duties of his pastoral office, was almost exclusively taken up with his struggle against the Calvinists of the Low Countries. His "Epistola ad Langravium Hassiæ-Rheinfeldtium" suggests some activity in Germany too. He delivered, at the church of the professed house at Antwerp, a series of sermons on controversial questions. Some of these he preached in the 'Grote markt' (main market-place) of Antwerp, there for the festivities held in connection with church dedication services. His sacred eloquence attracted Calvinists too.

== Works ==
Sommervogel enumerates about ninety writings of his, chiefly in Flemish. The "Kerckelycke Historie van de gheheele werelt" (Ecclesiastical history of the whole world), 4 vols (Antwerp, 1667–71) was translated into High German and enlarged by other Jesuits, under the title "Kirchengeschichte, das ist katholiches Christendum, durch die ganze Welt verbreitet".

All of Hazart's writings are apologetic and polemical in character. They focus on controversial questions: Holy Mass, the Real Presence of Christ in the Blessed Sacrament, the invocation and veneration of the saints, the force of good works, auricular confession, extreme unction, purgatory, idolatry, the primacy and authority of the pope and the Roman catechism. Hazart relied on Scripture and the early Church Fathers: he was quick to refute, but himself was flawed.

In the case of Schuler, he contented himself with a "Vriendelyke t'saemen-spraek tuschen D. Joannes Schulen Predicant tot Breda ende P. C. Hazart" (A friendly colloquy between John Schuler, preacher of Breda, and P. C. Hazart). Many of his writings, such as "Triomph de pausen van Roomen" (Triumph of the pope of Rome), gave rise to voluminous literature.

== Writings ==
- Kerckelycke historie van de gheheele werelt (4 vols., Michiel Cnobbaert, Antwerp, 1667–1671.
- Triomph der Pausen van Roomen (3 vols., Michiel Cnobbaert, Antwerp, 1678-1681).
- Triomph van de Christelycke Leere (2 vols., Michiel Cnobbaert, Antwerp, 1683).

== Bibliography ==
- R. Hardeman: Cornelius Hazart. Woorden voor dezen tijd, Alken, 1921.
- Carlos Sommervogel: Bibliothèque de la Compagnie de Jésus, vol.4, pp. 181–197.
