= Joannes del Rio =

Joannes del Rio (c. 1556–1624) was a clergyman from the Low Countries who became dean of Antwerp Cathedral.

== Life ==
Joannes del Rio was born in Bruges around 1556, the son of Luis de Rio. He became licentiate of both laws, protonotary apostolic, and diocesan official to the bishop of Antwerp.

In 1607 he was appointed dean of the cathedral chapter in Antwerp. At least two books were dedicated to him in that capacity: Aubert Miraeus' Rerum toto orbe gestarum chronica (1608), and Heribert Rosweyde's life of Martin Delrio (1609). In 1611 he delivered a funeral sermon for the bishop Joannes Miraeus.

He died in Antwerp on 5 January 1624, and was buried in the cathedral. He bequeathed considerable sums to the cathedral, to the Jesuit college in Antwerp, and to the Church of St Saviour in Bruges.

== Works ==
- Oratio in funere reverendissimi domini Ioannis Miraei IV. Antverpiensium Episcopi (Antwerp, Plantin Press, 1611).
- Moralis explicatio psalmi CXVIII: Beati immaculati in via (Antwerp, Hieronymus Verdussen, 1617).
