= Westerlo =

- Municipality
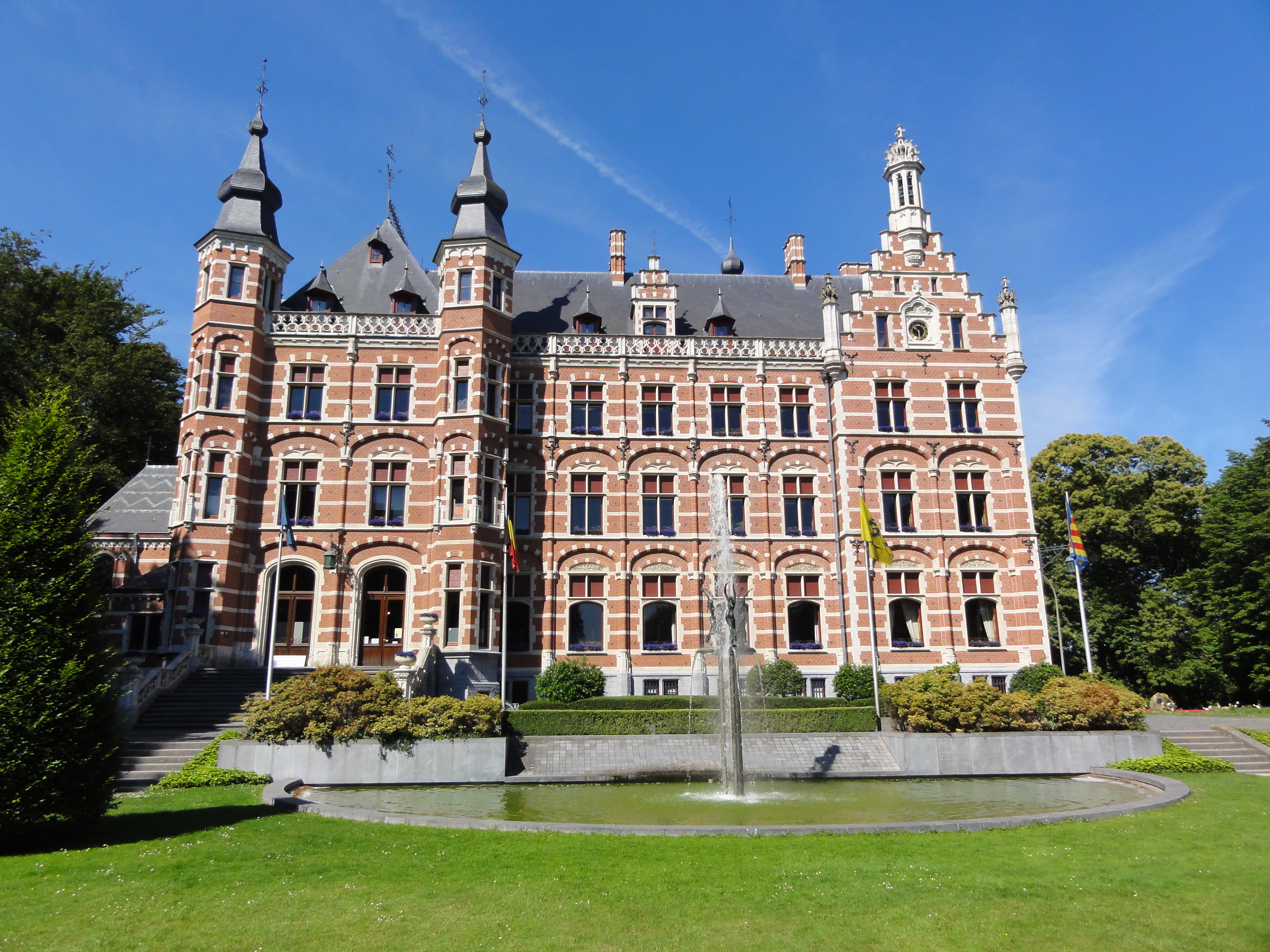
- Town Hall of Westerlo

- Flag Coat of arms

- Westerlo municipality in the province of Antwerp
- Interactive map of Westerlo
- Location in Belgium
- Coordinates: 51°05′N 04°55′E
- Country: Belgium
- Community: Flemish Community
- Region: Flemish Region
- Province: Antwerp
- Arrondissement: Turnhout

Government
  - Mayor: Guy Van Hirtum (CD&V)
  - Governing party: CD&V

Area
  - Total: 55.47 km^{2} (21.42 sq mi)

Population (2018-01-01)
  - Total: 24,884
  - Density: 448.6/km^{2} (1,162/sq mi)
- Postal codes: 2260
- NIS code: 13049
- Area codes: 014 - 015 - 016
- Website: www.westerlo.be

Westerlo (Dutch pronunciation: [ˈʋɛstərloː]) is a municipality located in the Belgian province of Antwerp. The municipality comprises seven towns:

- Westerlo centrum
- Oevel
- Tongerlo
- Heultje
- Voortkapel
- Oosterwijk
- Zoerle-Parwijs
- De beeltjens westerlo

In 2021, Westerlo had a total population of 25,288. The total area is 55.13 km^{2}.

== Places of interest ==
- Castle of Westerlo has been in the possession of the House of Merode uninterruptedly since the late 15th century. It has served as the most important country estate of the senior branch since the 16th century. In 1910-12 Countess Jeanne de Merode built a new neogothic castle for herself which serves as the town hall of Westerlo since the 1970s.
- Tongerlo Abbey contains a very old and fine copy of Leonardo da Vinci's The Last Supper. It is also known as home of the Tongerlo Abbey beer, but this is no longer brewed at the abbey.

== Gallery ==
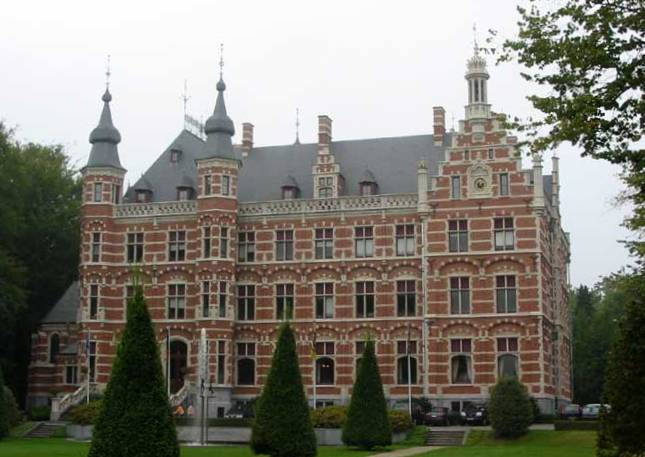
Westerlo, town hall

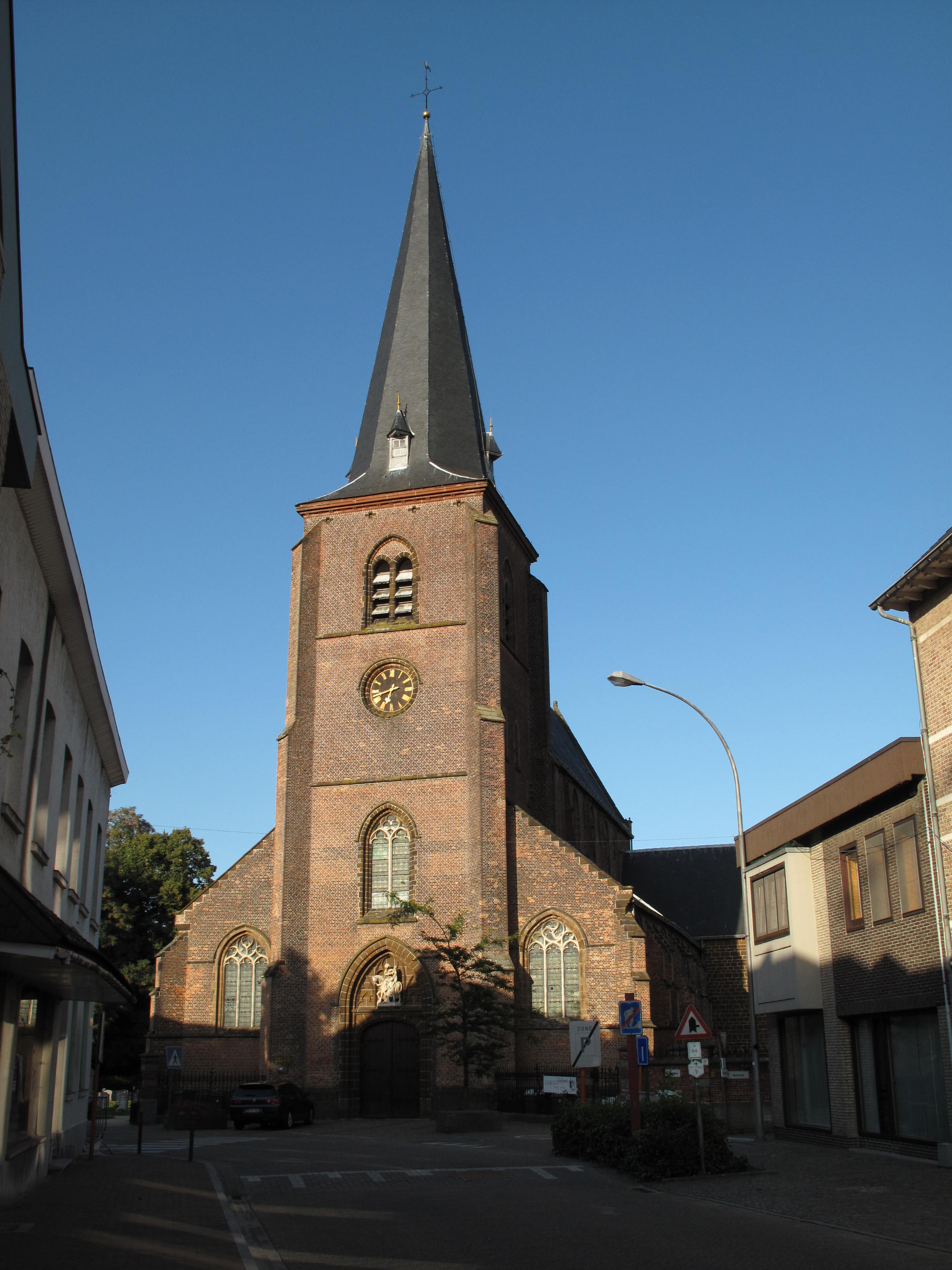
Westerlo, church

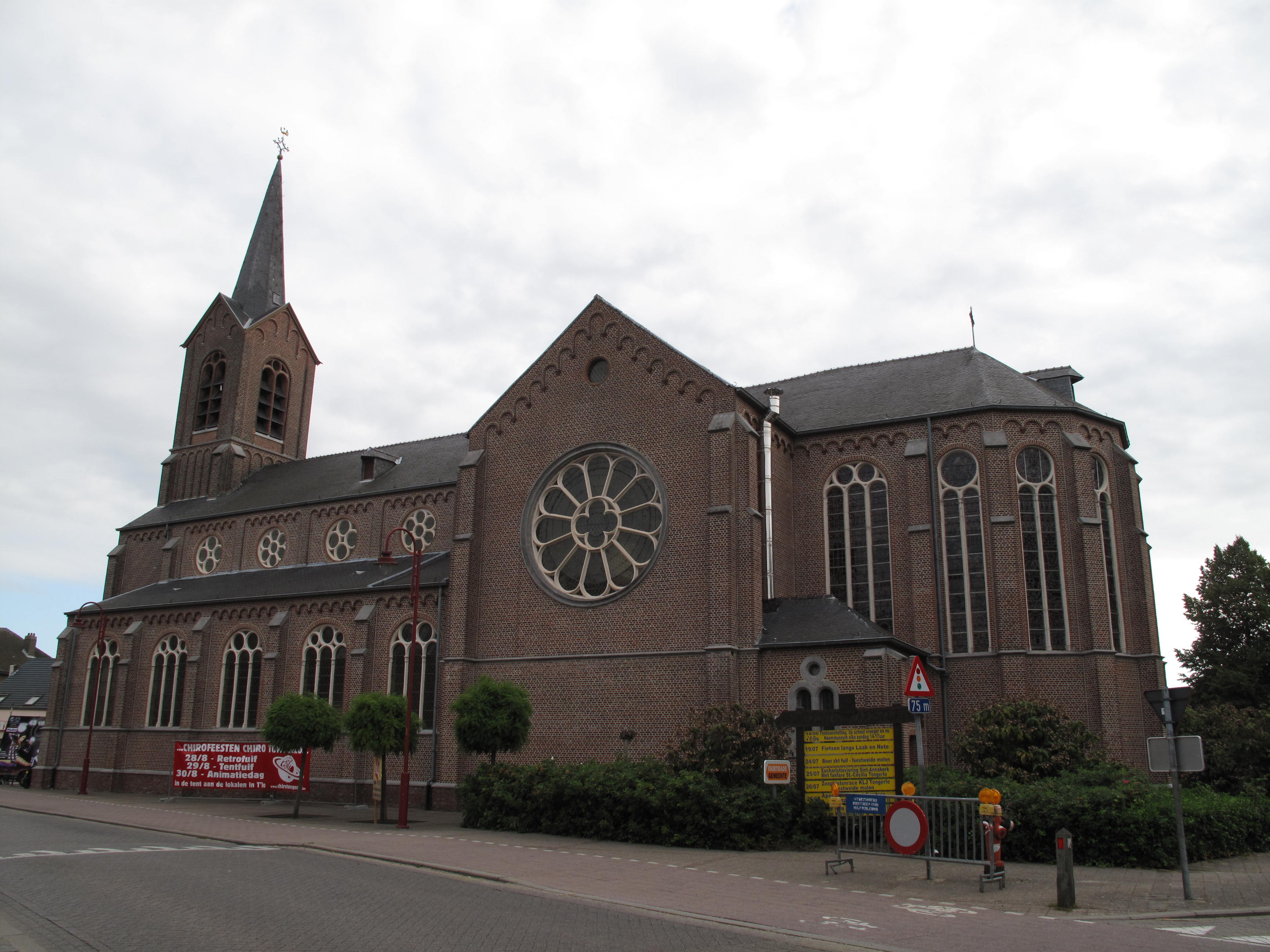
Tongerlo, church

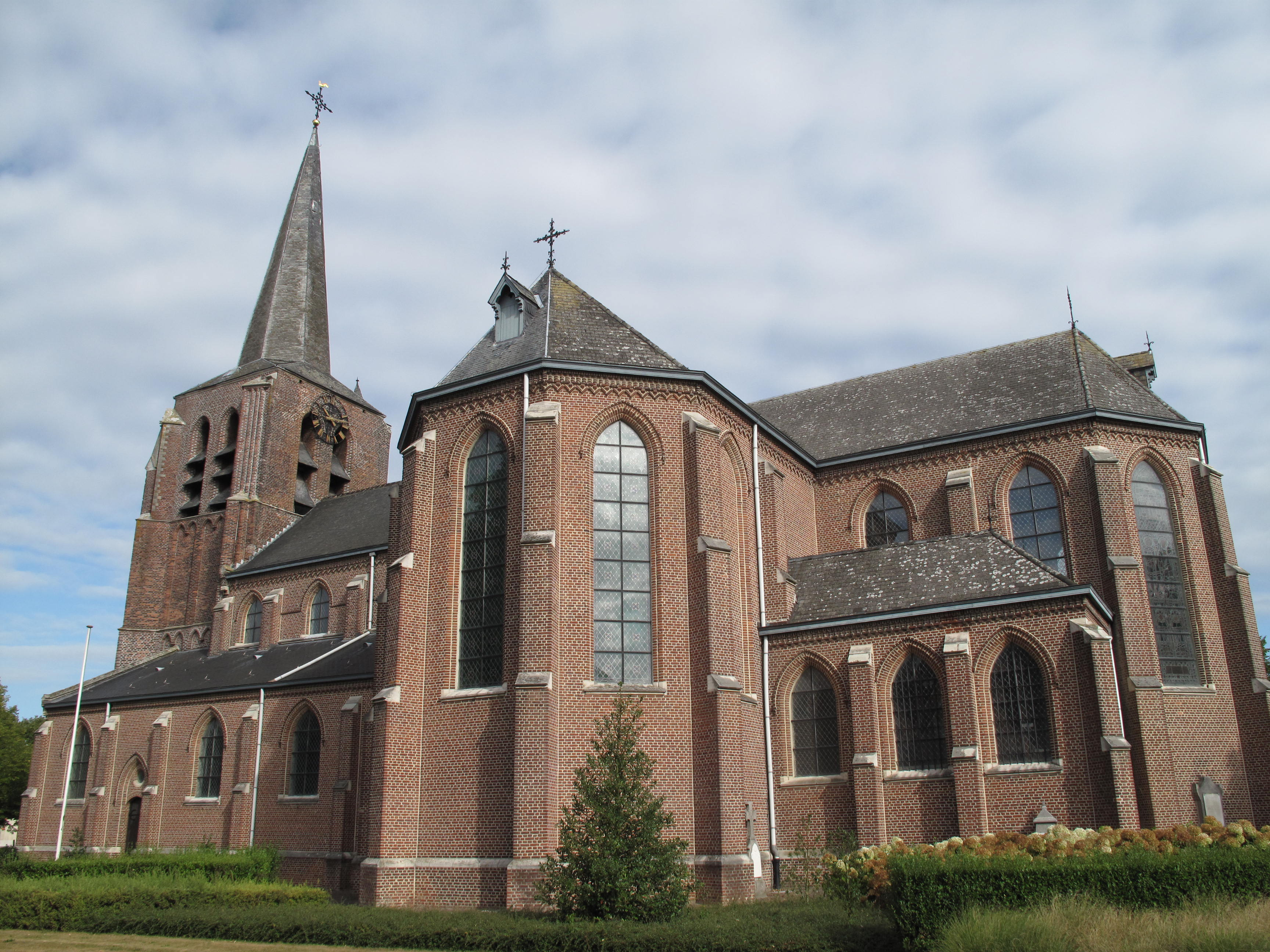
Oevel, church

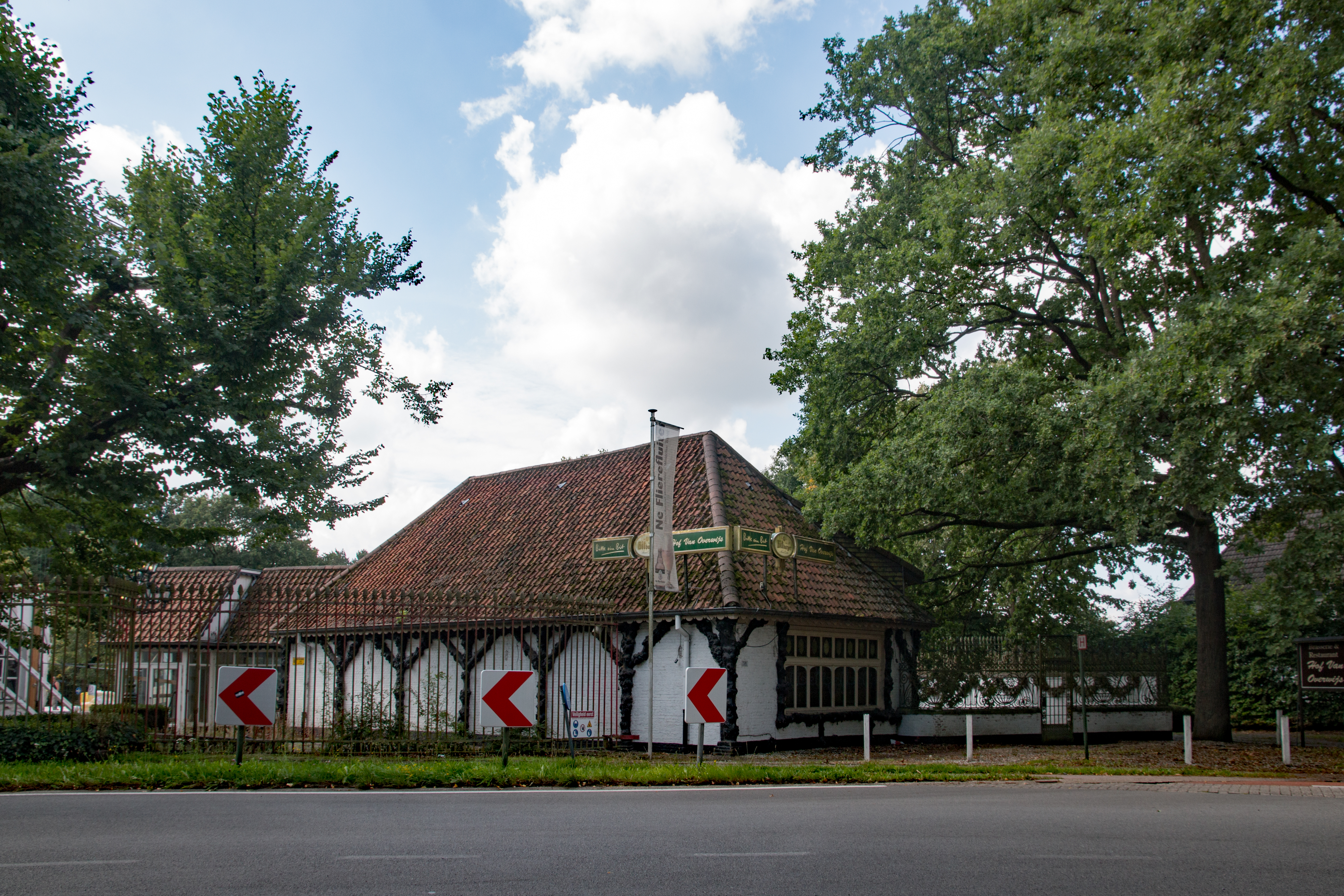
Hof van Overwijs

== See also ==
- Lords of Westerlo
- Jean Philippe Eugène de Mérode
- Castle of Westerlo
- K.V.C. Westerlo
