= Peter Hubert Evermode Backx =

Belgian abbot (1805–1868)

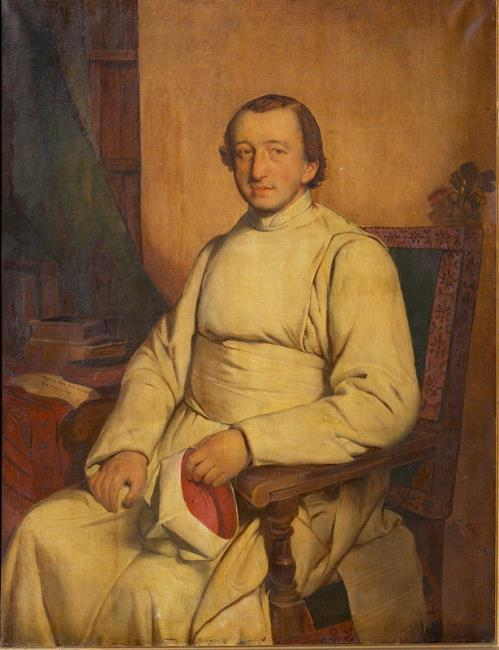

Peter Hubert Evermode Backx (1805–1868) was a 19th-century abbot of Tongerlo Abbey, in Belgium.
