= Adriaan Stalpaerts =

Adriaan Stalpaerts (1563–1629) was an abbot of Tongerlo Abbey, either the 36th or the 41st depending on the sources followed.

== Life ==
Stalpaerts was born in Hilvarenbeek in 1563 and entered the Premonstratensian Order on 20 April 1585. He professed his vows on 1 May 1586 and was ordained a priest on 23 May 1587. In 1593 he was appointed parish priest of Hoogeloon, transferring to Waalwijk in 1599.

On 24 August 1607 Stalpaerts was elected coadjutor to Abbot Nicolaas Mudtsaerts, with the government confirming the election on 21 October 1607. He then studied at Douai University until November 1608, when Mudtsaerts died and Stalpaerts succeeded him as abbot. He took possession of the abbacy on 1 December 1608, and was consecrated by Bishop Ghisbertus Masius on 11 January 1609.

As abbot, Stalpaerts worked to enforce Tridentine discipline and repair the abbey. In 1615 a new chapel he had built was consecrated, and on 6 July 1617 he installed the relics of Siardus, of Marienhof Abbey in Friesland, in Tongerlo.

He also encouraged monastic scholarship, and had Joseph Barbato instruct the monks in Greek and Hebrew. A noted patron of the sciences, in 1619 he established three scholarships at St Willibrord's College, Leuven, and in 1628 a Premonstratensian house of studies in Rome, St Norbert's College.

He died at Duffel on 25 October 1629, while travelling back from the installation of the abbot of St. Michael's Abbey, Antwerp. On his deathbed he was visited by Bishop Michael Ophovius.

He was buried in the chapel of St Norbert in Tongerlo, but in 1724 his remains were transferred to the chapel of St Peter.

Books dedicated to him include Aubertus Miraeus's Ordinis Praemonstratensis chronicon (1623) and Leonardus Lessius' De summo bono et aeterna beatitudine hominis (1626).
