= Joannes Cnobbaert =

Flemish printer and publisher (1590–1637)

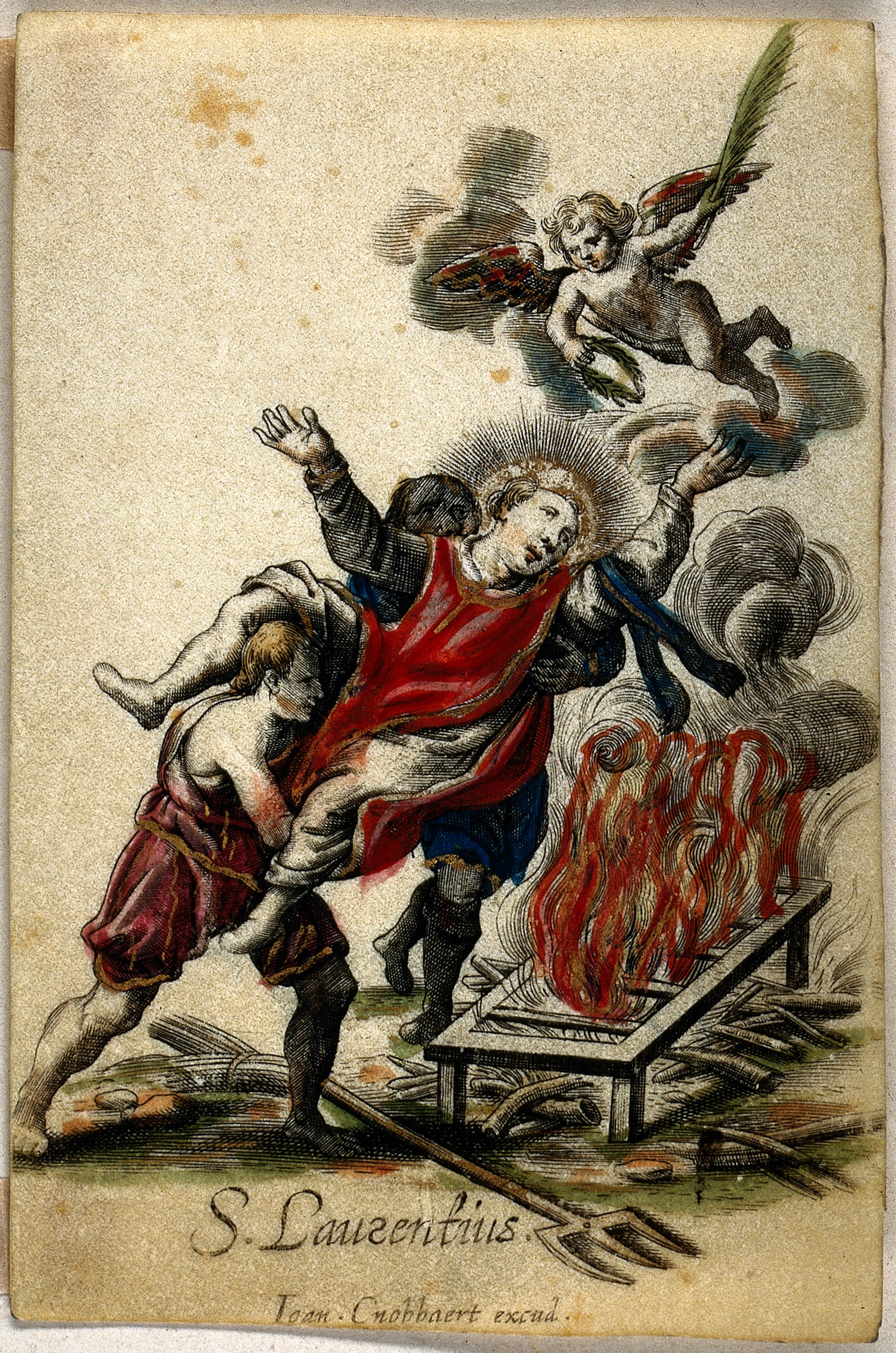
Martyrdom of St Lawrence, coloured etching on vellum, published by Joannes Cnobbaert

Jan or Joannes Cnobbaert (1590–1637) was a Flemish printer, publisher and bookseller who was active in Antwerp in the early 17th century.

== Life ==
Cnobbaert was born in Antwerp in 1590. He married Maria de Man. In 1623 he was registered as living next to the 'Huys der Professen vande Societeyt IESV, in S. Peeter' in Antwerp. After he died in Antwerp on 14 September 1637 his widow Maria continued the business as "Widow of Jan Cnobbaert" ('Vidua Cnobbaert' or 'Veuve Cnobbaert'). The printer Michiel Cnobbaert or Knobbaert who was active at the same address in the 1660s and early 1670s was probably a relative (possibly a son).

In 1642 his daughter, Jacoba Maria, married the artist Jan Thomas van Ieperen.

== Publications ==
- 1620: Johann Buchler, Thesaurus phrasium poeticarum
- 1625: Lodewijk Makeblijde, Den hemelschen handel der devote zielen
- 1627: [Antwerp Jesuits], Typus mundi in quo eius calamitates et pericula nec non diuini, humanique amoris antipathia, emblematice proponuntur
- 1628: Richard Verstegan, Oorloge ghevochten met die wapenen van die waerheydt en van die reden
- 1629: De groote evangelische peerle vol devote ghebeden, goddelijcke oeffeningen, ende gheestelijcke leeringhen
- 1631: Antonius a Burgundia, Linguae vitia et remedia

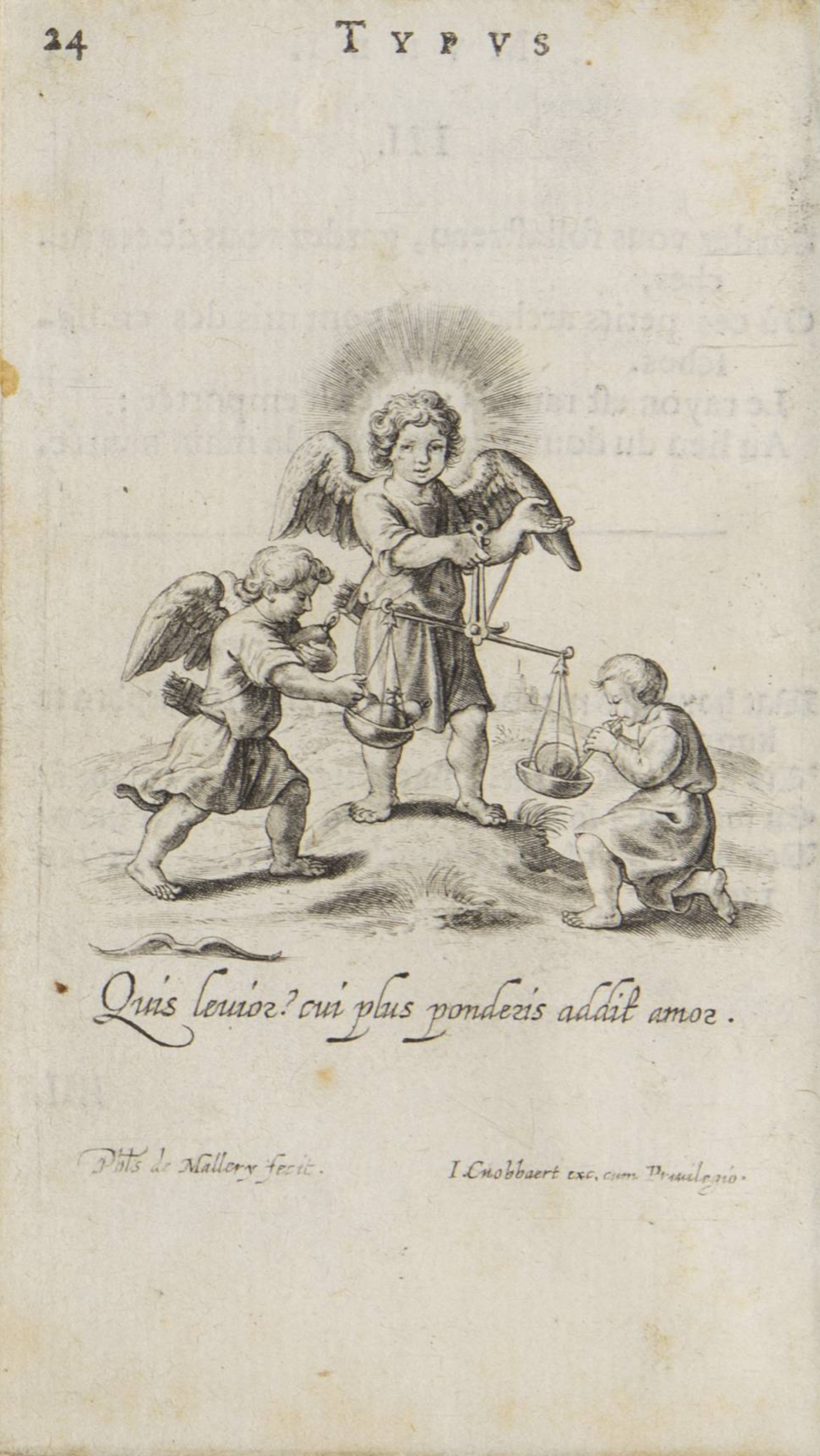
Emblem engraved by Philips van Mallery for the Typus mundi, 1627

- 1632
  - Jaerlijcksche brieven van Japonien der jaren 1625. 1626. 1627
  - Guilielmus Bolognino, Uyt-vaert van het ghereformeert nachtmael
  - Augustinus Wichmans, Brabantia Mariana tripartita
  - Bonaventura Speeckaert, Den Spieghel der Patientie onses salighmakers Iesu Christi ghebenediidt
- 1634
  - François-Hyacinthe Choquet, Mariae Deiparae in ordinem praedicatorum viscera materna
  - Erycius Puteanus, Historiae barbaricae libri VI
- 1635
  - Augustine of Hippo, De boecken der belydenissen
  - Diego de Aedo y Gallart, El memorable y glorioso viaje del infante Cardenal D. Fernándo de Avstria
    - French translation as Le voyage du prince Don Fernande frère du Roy Philippe IV
  - Famiano Strada, De Bello Belgico
  - Michiel Zachmoorter, Thalamus sponsi, bruydegom's beddeken: het tweede deel
- 1636
  - Cornelius Curtius, Virorum illustrium ex ordine eremitarum D. Augustini
  - Jeremias Drexel, Caelum beatorum civitas aeternitatis
