= Bonaventura Speeckaert =

Bonaventura Speeckaert, religious name of Ingelbertus Speeckaert (c. 1570–1633) was a member of the Capuchin Order from the Low Countries. He had a reputation as a preacher and was the author of at least one devotional work in Dutch.

== Life ==
Speeckaert was born in Brussels, the son of Judocus Speeckaert and Barbara Vandenbroecke, and was baptised Ingelbertus in Brussels Minster on 12 May 1575. He entered the Capuchin novitiate in Brussels, under the novice master Felix van Lapedon, taking the name in religion Bonaventura. He was professed as a Capuchin on 14 July 1593, giving his age as 23. In 1597 he was living in Tournai. As a young priest in 1603 he was made a prior and put in charge of the construction of a new friary in Meenen.

In 1608 he became custos in Leuven and the following year first prior of the new foundation in Ypres. He was in the Antwerp house in 1611, in Brussels in 1612, in the Rhineland 1614–1617, and was appointed preacher and confessor in Ghent on 6 July 1617. He died in Brussels on 17 February 1633.

== Works ==
- Den Spieghel der Patientie onses salighmakers Iesu Christi ghebenedijdt (Antwerp, Joannes Cnobbaert, 1632)
