= Tongerlo =

Village in Flanders, Belgium

- Village
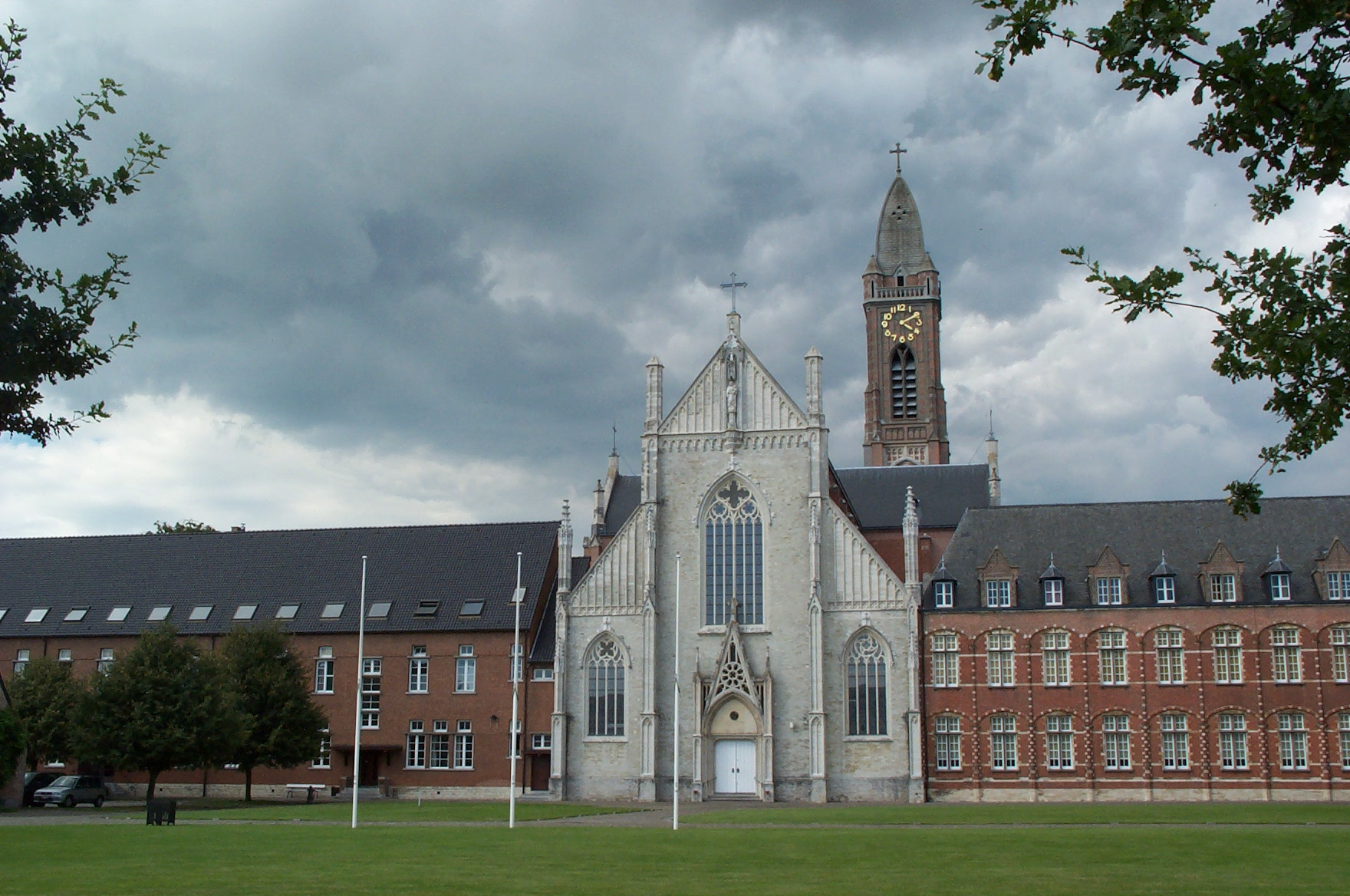
- Tongerlo Abbey

- Location in Belgium
- Coordinates: 51.1092°N 4.9150°E
- Country: Belgium
- Region: Flemish Region
- Province: Antwerp
- Municipality: Westerlo

Area
  - Total: 20.41 km^{2} (7.88 sq mi)

Population (2021)
  - Total: 7,506
  - Density: 367.8/km^{2} (952.5/sq mi)
- Time zone: CET

Tongerlo is a village and deelgemeente (sub-municipality) of the municipality of Westerlo in the province of Antwerp, Belgium. The village is located about 10 kilometres (6.2 mi) south-east of the city of Herentals. Tongerlo is best known for Tongerlo Abbey, which became one of the most important abbeys of Belgium.

== History ==
Around 1133, the Premonstratensian abbey of Tongerlo was founded in the village of Tongerlo. It was double monastery until 1140. The abbey developed into one of the most important abbeys of Belgium. The abbot became the Lord of the village heerlijkheid (landed estate), and used to have joint judicial powers. In 1644, the abbey bought full judicial powers for the heerlijkheid.

The power of the abbey started to decline after 1773. In 1789 and 1790, the abbey participated in the Brabant Revolution against the Austrian Netherlands. The revolutionaries were defeated, and abbey lost control over the heerlijkheid. Tongerlo Abbey was dissolved in 1796 after the French Revolution, and the village of Tongerlo formed an independent municipality with hamlet of Oosterwijk. The monastery returned to the abbey in 1840. Tongerlo remained independent until 1971 when it was merged into Westerlo.

== Buildings and sights ==
Tongerlo Abbey founded in 1128, is the main sight in Tongerlo. The grounds contain the Our Lady Church, and the Da Vinci museum with a replica of Leonardo da Vinci's The Last Supper and a tithe barn (In the Middle Age, farmers were required to give one-tenth of their produce to the established church).

The grist mill Beddermolen is a wooden wind mill. There was a windmill at the location before 1535. The current wind mill dates from 1723 and was in service until 1948. It was restored in 1963, but was severely damaged by fire in 1967. In 1981, it was rebuilt and every undamaged piece of the former windmill was reused, but it was not able to grind. Between 2016 and 2017, the Beddermolen was restored to working order, and is in service every first and third Sunday of the month.

Hof ter Bruelen is a castle built in 1915 in Renaissance Revival style. It was constructed using material from older buildings like the 16th century Egmont Palace of Brussels and the city of walls of Antwerp. The castle was designed by Octave Flanneau and contains a large park.

Since 1987, Tongerlo organises an annual village festival during the second weekend in May.

== Gallery ==
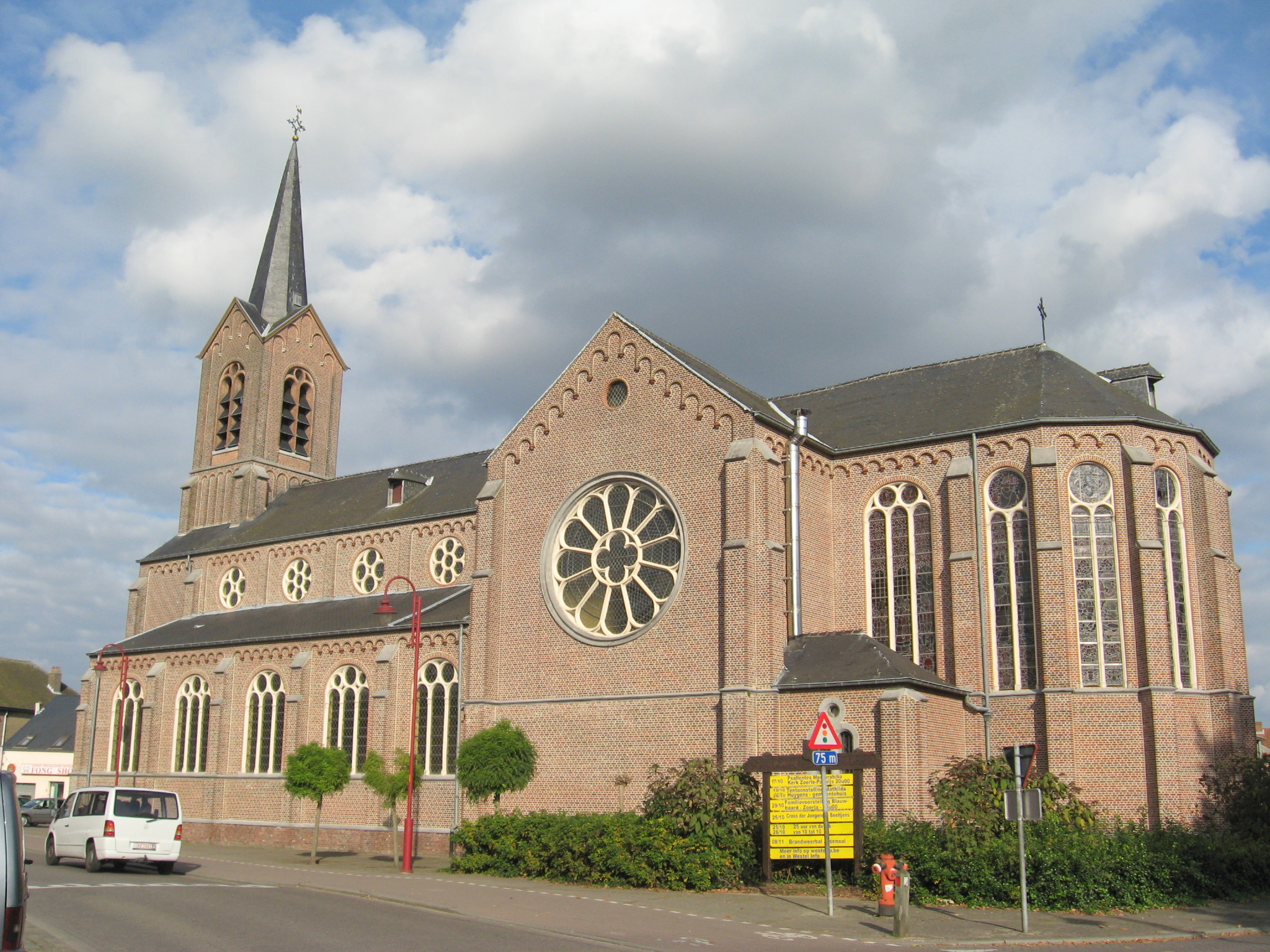
St Anna Church

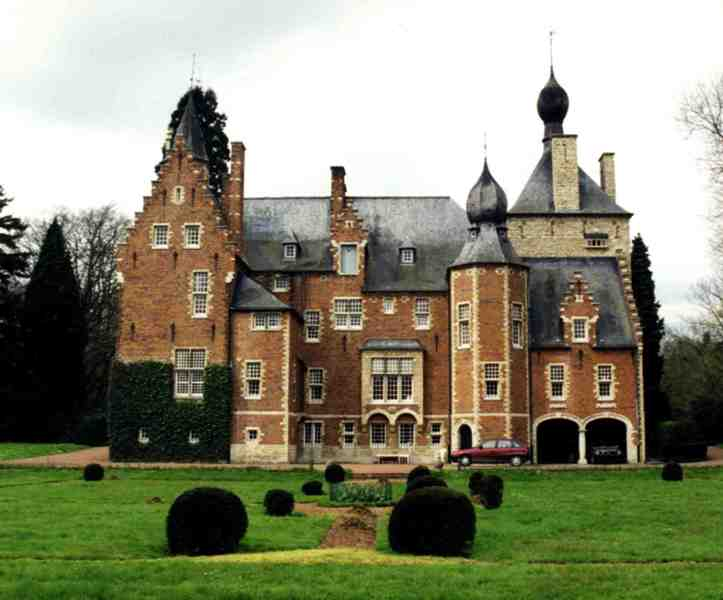
Hof ter Bruelen

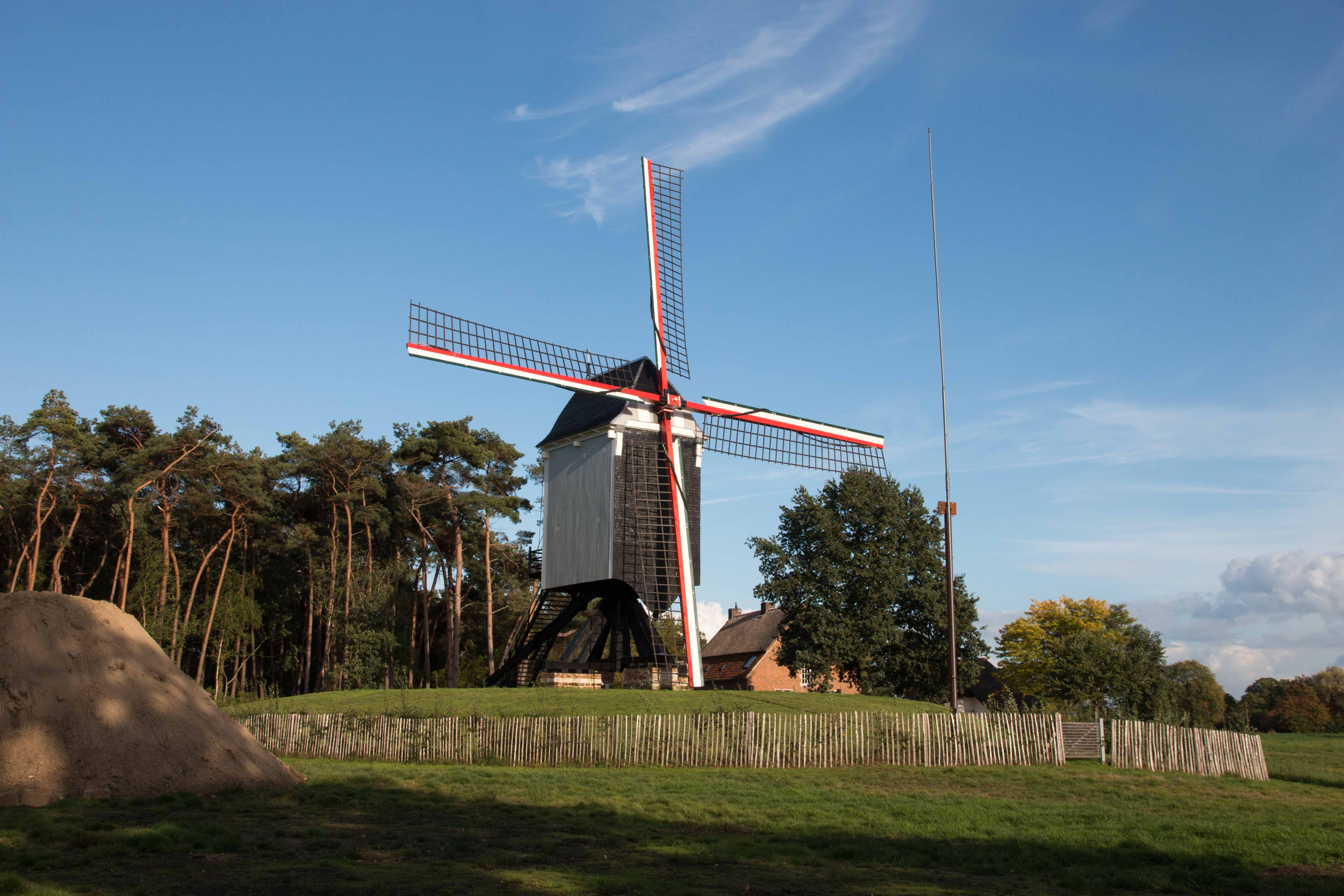
Windmill Beddermolen

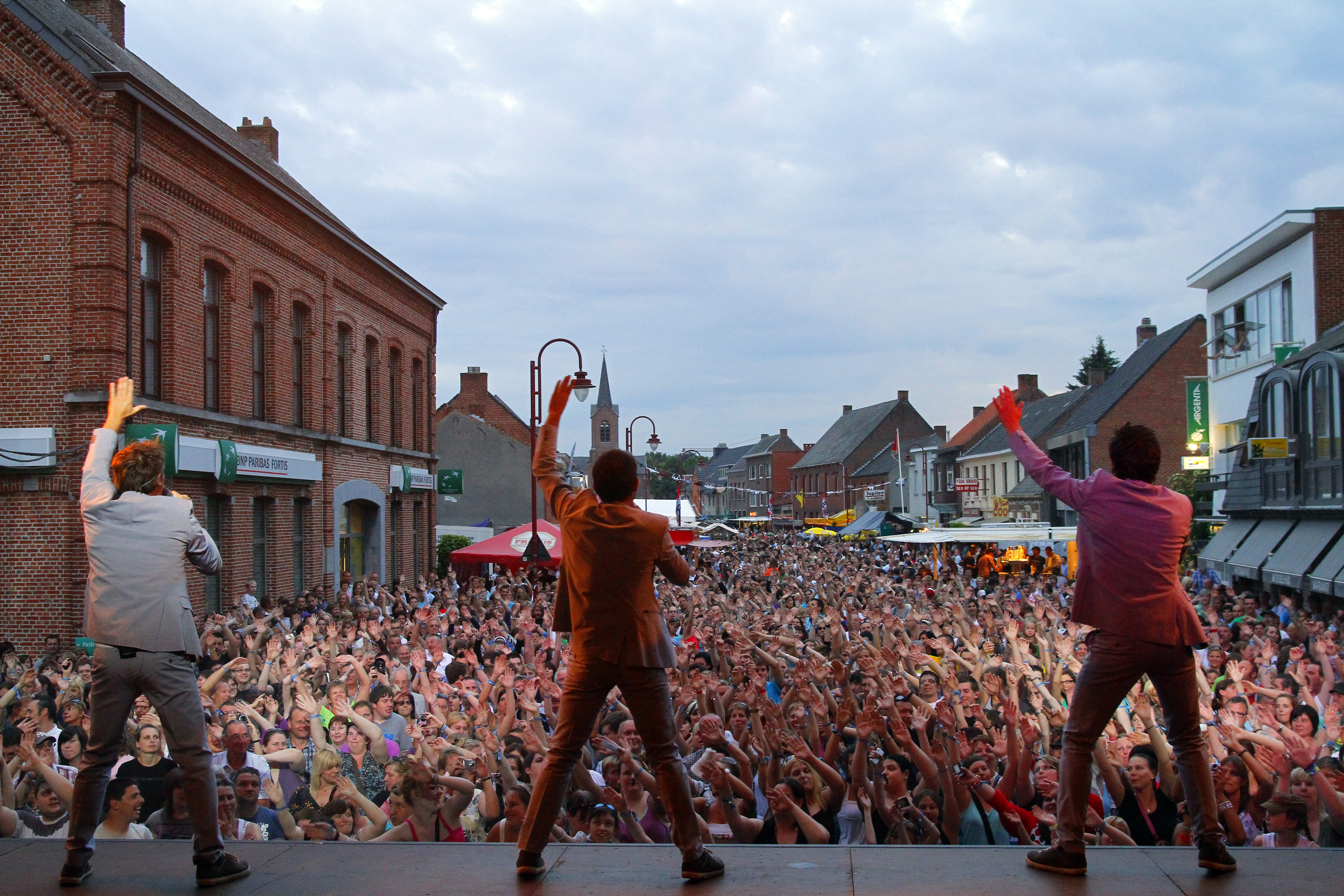
Tongerlo Village Festival (2011)
