= Tongerlo Abbey =

Monastery in Belgium

Coordinates: 51°06′19.04″N 4°54′22.95″E

- Abdij van Tongerlo
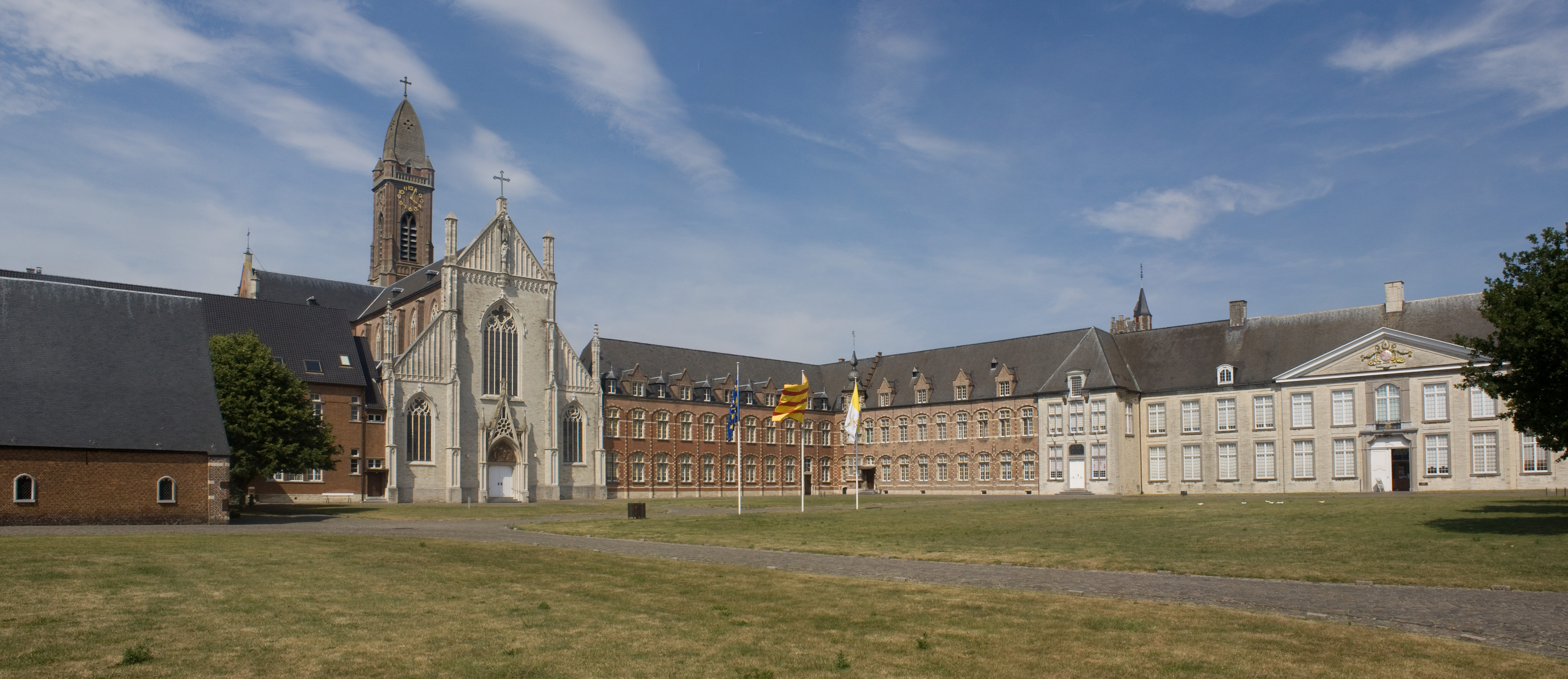
- Tongerlo Abbey, panoramic view

Monastery information
- Order: Premonstratensian
- Established: c. 1133
- Disestablished: 1796
- Reestablished: 1838
- Mother house: St. Michael's Abbey, Antwerp
- Dedication: Virgin Mary
- Archdiocese: foundation: Cambrai, after 1559: Mechelen-Brussels
- Diocese: Diocese of Antwerp

People
- Founders: Giselbert of Kasterlee, Abbot Waltman of St. Michael's Abbey
- Abbot: Jeroen De Cuyper

Site
- Location: Tongerlo, Belgium
- Website: www.tongerlo.org

Tongerlo Abbey (Dutch: Abdij van Tongerlo, French: Abbaye de Tongerlo) is a Premonstratensian monastery in Tongerlo, a submunicipality of Westerlo, Belgium. The abbey was a large religious centre in the campine region, and played an important role in the politics of the Duchy of Brabant.

It was shortly disestablished following the French conquest of the low countries during the Napoleonic era. Not long after the Belgian Revolution, the abbey would be reestablished in 1838. It is still active as a monastery to this day.

== History ==
=== Foundation ===
The exact details of the foundation of the abbey of Tongerlo remain unclear, but it was most likely established around 1133. Its founders were Abbot Waltman of the St Michael’s Abbey and a local nobleman, Giselbert of Kasterlee, who provided the founding canons and allodial lands, respectively. Giselbert of Kasterlee later joined the monastic community. The foundational charter also mentions the presence of Bernard of Clairvaux, and the approval by Bishop Burchard of Cambrai.

The unclear nature of its foundation is due to the disputed credibility of its foundational charter. Supposedly it was drawn up by Bishop Burchard in 1133, despite the fact that he was already deceased in 1130. The charter also does not mention Giselbert of Kasterlee, despite including lands he donated. He is, however, identified as fundator in the abbey’s obituary and in a papal bull dating 1186.

=== Later History ===
From small beginnings the abbey became influential in the district called Campine, now in north-east Belgium and the south of the Netherlands, then a wild area. The bishops of Cambrai, the chapters of Liège and Maastricht, and several landowners entrusted the charge of parishes, with the right of patronage, to the abbey. In time the abbey had to provide priests for some forty parishes in these parts.

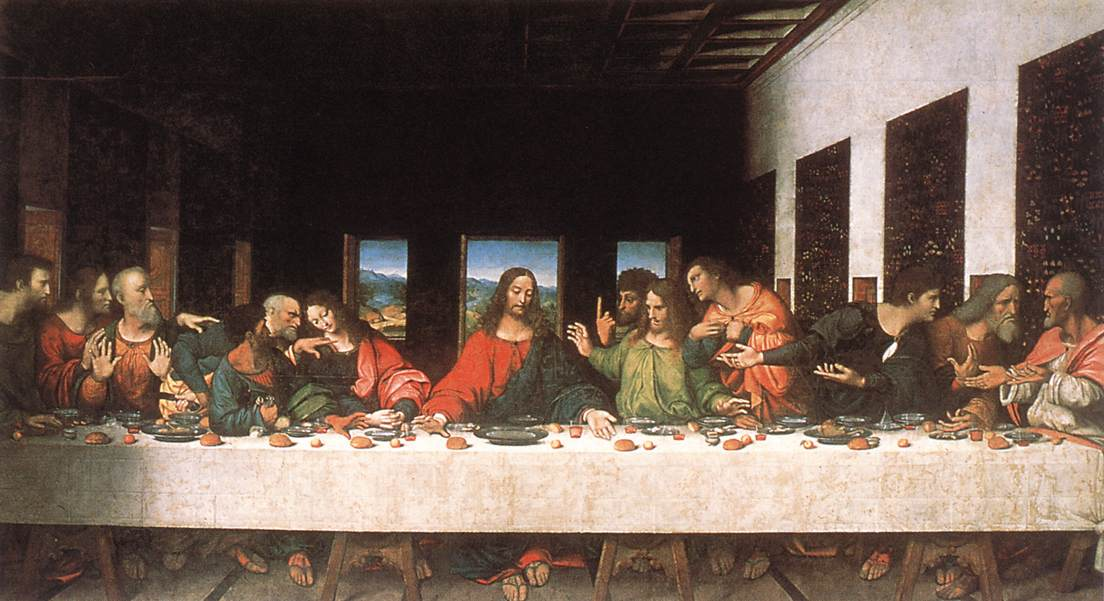
Copy of Leonardo da Vinci's Last Supper, probably by Andrea di Bartoli Solari

With the erection of new dioceses (1559–60) in Belgium and the Netherlands, heavy burdens were cast on the abbey, for not only had it to provide funds for the new diocese of 's-Hertogenbosch, but the new bishop was put at its head as abbot. This state of affairs lasted until 1590, when, to obtain its independence, the abbey had to give up much property in support of the new diocese. The abbey was a centre of education. It possessed one of the largest libraries, and was able to take up the work of the Bollandists.

The rise of Calvinism in the Netherlands caused conflict. Three canons of Tongerlo became Catholic martyrs: Arnold Vessem and Hendrik Bosch in 1557, and Peter Janssens in 1572. In the seventeenth century Francis Wichmans of the abbey rallied local Catholics.

Adrianus Stalpaerts (1563–1629) was the 41st (according to other sources the 36th) abbot of Tongerlo, from 1608 until his death. Stalpaerts encouraged the pursuit of academic scholarship in the monastery. From 1725 to 1732 Willem Ignatius Kerricx worked as an architect, sculptor and painter on the decorations for the Tongerlo Abbey and designed the new the abbot's residence.

The abbey's property was confiscated and sold by the French occupying forces in 1796, but in 1840 was bought back under its post-revolutionary re-founder, Peter Hubert Evermode Backx.

In 1899, under abbot Thomas Louis Heylen, a filiation was made to Manchester as Corpus Christi Priory.

The abbey is also the site of a Leonardo da Vinci Museum, which contains a 16th-century copy on canvas of Leonardo's Last Supper, in approximately original size. The copy reveals many details that are no longer visible in the original fresco due to deterioration.

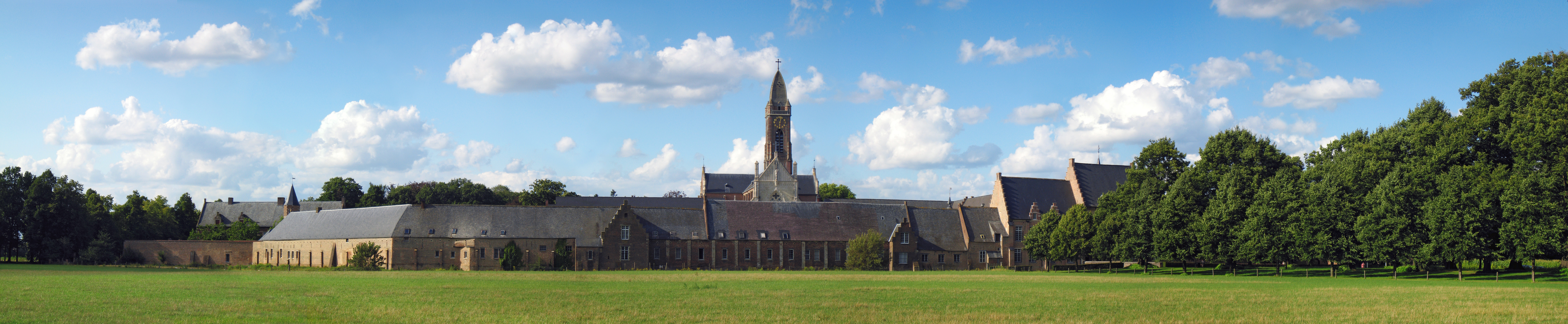
Tongerlo Abbey

== See also ==
- Premonstratensians
- List of monasteries in Belgium
- St. Michael's Abbey, Antwerp
- Park Abbey, Heverlee
- The Last Supper (Leonardo)
