= Michiel Cnobbaert =

Flemish printer and publisher

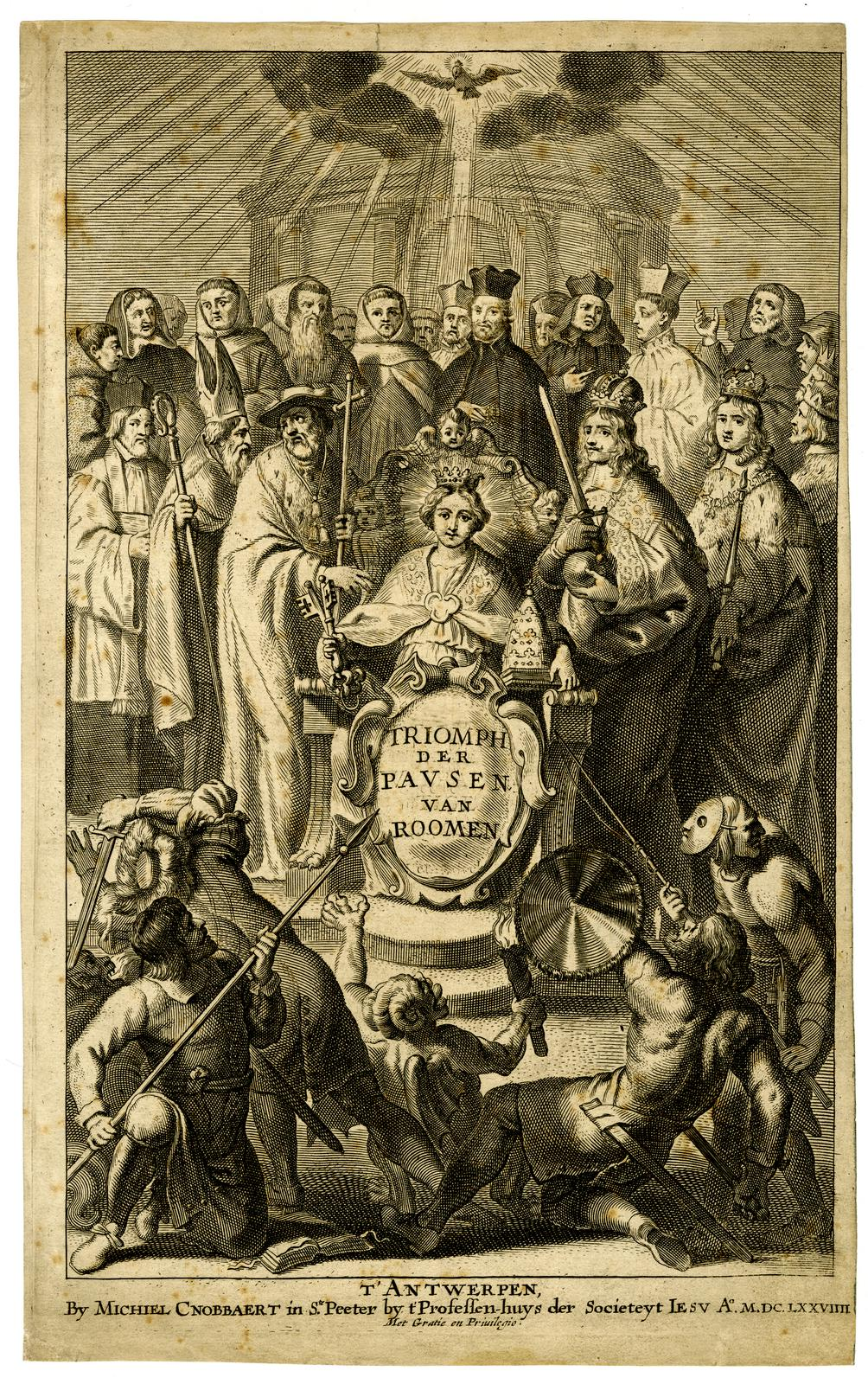
Title page of Cornelius Hazart's Triomph der pausen van Roomen, 1679

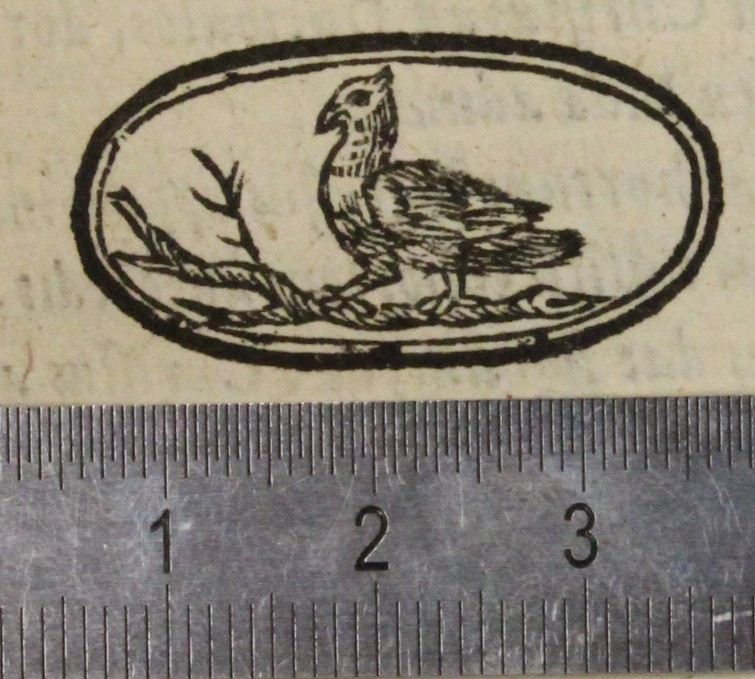
Printer's mark of Michiel Cnobbaert, found in Guilielmus Stanihurstus, Dei immortalis in corpore mortali patientis historia (1664), Universiteit Antwerpen - Ruusbroecgenootschap, RG 3046 E 4 (f. *8 recto)

Michiel Cnobbaert or Michiel Knobbaert (fl 1652–1706) was a Flemish printer, publisher and bookseller who was active in Antwerp in the latter half of the 17th century. His publications included devotional works, religious and polemical works and legal publications on local laws and customs in Flanders.

== Life ==
Details about the life of Michiel Cnobbaert are scarce. He may have been born in Antwerp as the son of the Antwerp printers and publishers Joannes Cnobbaert and Maria de Man. In 1623 Joannes Cnobbaert was registered as living next to the 'Huys der Professen vande Societeyt IESV, in S. Peeter' in Antwerp. After he died in Antwerp on 14 September 1637 Maria de Man continued the publishing business of her deceased husband as "Widow of Jan Cnobbaert" ('Vidua Cnobbaert' or 'Veuve Cnobbaert').

In 1642 Michiel Cnobbaert's presumed sister, Jacoba Maria Cnobbaert, married the prominent portrait painter Jan Thomas van Ieperen.

Michiel was registered as a wijnmeester (son of a master) in the register of the Antwerp Guild of Saint Luke in the Guild year 1652–1653. His presumed mother Maria de Man (Cnobbaert) died on 18 March 1671. He was active at the same address as his presumed father Joannes Cnobbaert from the early 1670s until 1706.

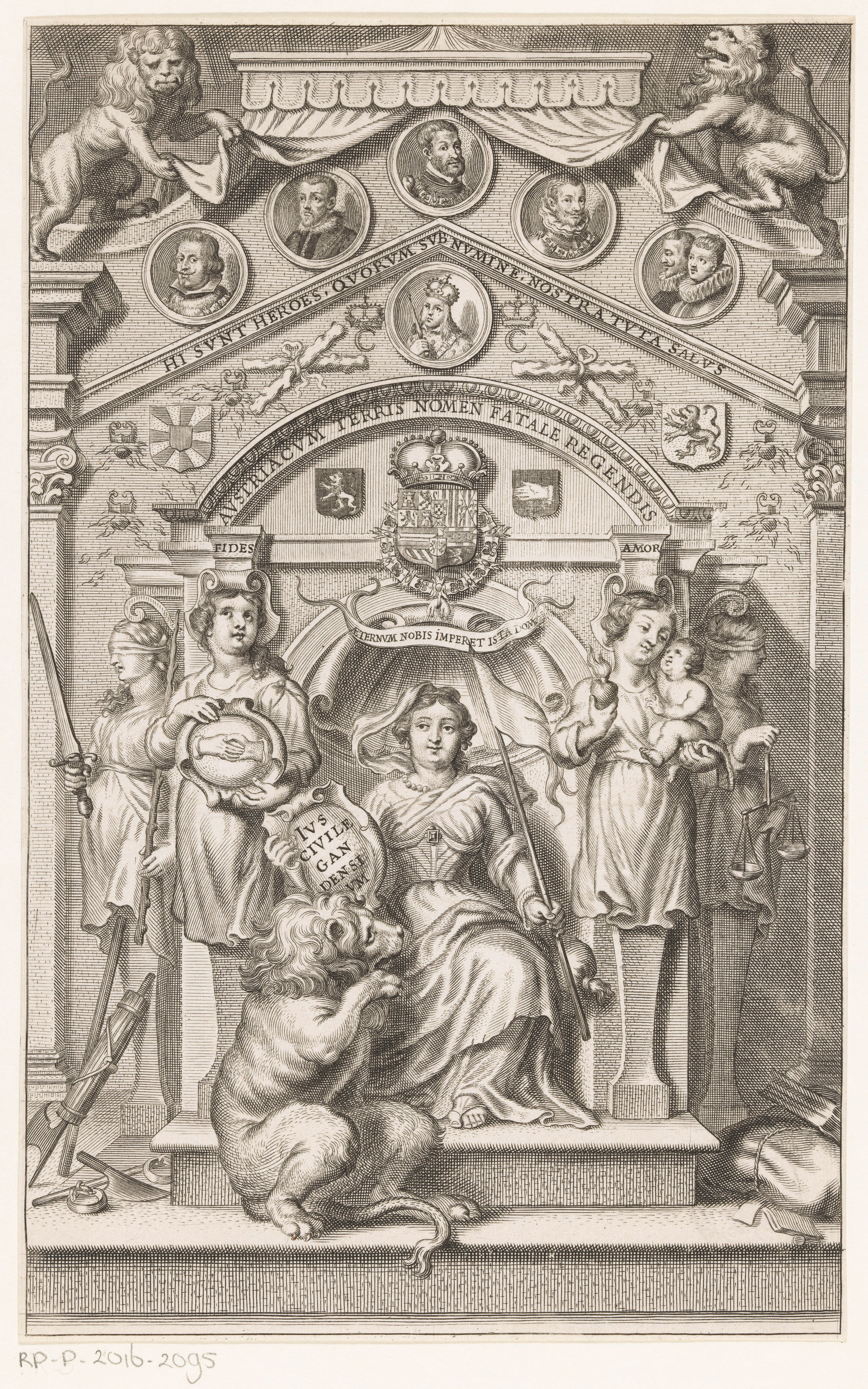
Title page of Joannes Antonius Cnobbaert's Jus civile gandensium, 1677

He obtained royal privileges that gave him exclusivity to print in Antwerp books on laws decreed by the counts of Flanders and the so-called suffragia.

== Publications ==
He published devotional works, religious and polemical works and legal publications on local customary law in Flanders and Brabant. He was known for his so-called suffragia, i.e. pictures of saints praying in community for the intercession of saints, the practice of virtues and for each other. He published many works by Jesuit authors, including the April and May volumes of the Bollandists' Acta Sanctorum (1675, 1685). This may have been related to the location of his printing house next to the seat of the Jesuit Order in Antwerp. He published works by the founder of the Jesuits as well as polemical critics of the Reformation such as the Flemish Jesuit Cornelius Hazart.

Using his privilege granted for the area of Antwerp, he published and republished various books on local customary law as well as publications by eminent legal scholars such as his name sake Joannes Antonius Cnobbaert (Joannes Antonius Cnobbaert, Jus civile gandensium, Antwerp, Michiel Cnobbaert, 1677).
