= Petrus van Kalmpthout =

Roman Norbertine priest

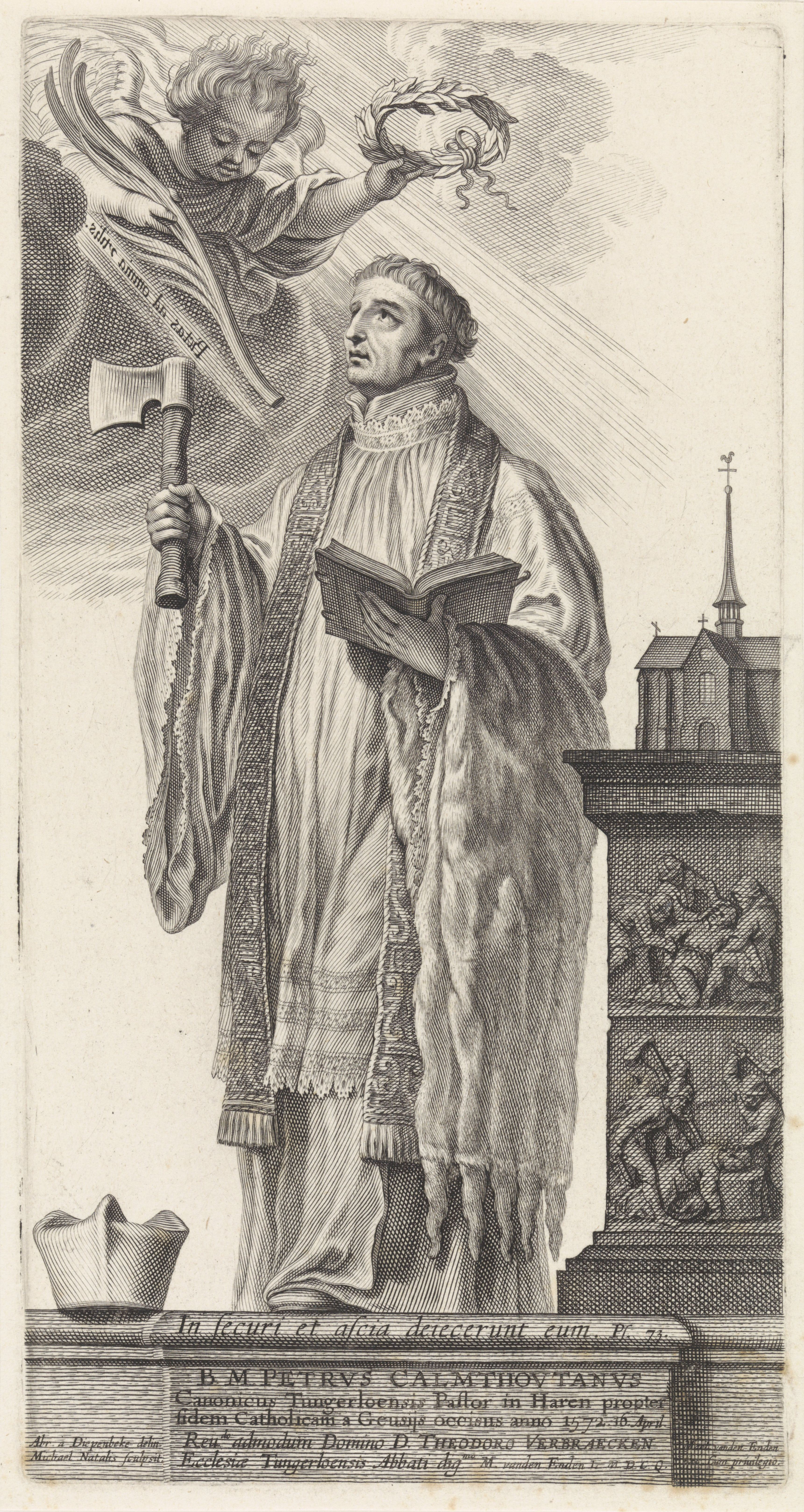
Petrus van Kalmpthout, engraved by Michel Natalis after Abraham van Diepenbeeck

Peter Janssens van Kalmthout was a Norbertine priest from the Duchy of Brabant who was murdered by Dutch rebels on the night of 16 April 1572.

== Life ==
Janssens was born in Kalmthout around 1535, the son of a tenant of Tongerlo Abbey. In January 1556 he was clothed as a Norbertine in Tongerlo, and in May 1558 he made his solemn profession. After ordination in Brussels he was appointed the monastery's circator. Around 1566 he was installed as priest of the dependent parish of Haaren, near Oisterwijk, where he preached against the Reformed. On the night of 16 April 1572, a gang of rebels plundered the rectory and tortured the parish priest, demanding that he renounce the Catholic faith. When he refused they cut off his head with an axe. His mutilated body was carried to Tongerlo for burial.

== Veneration and iconography ==
No beatification process was ever instituted, but he was commemorated as a victim of hatred of Catholicism. In art he is shown as a Norbertine priest holding the axe with which he was beheaded.

In 1977 a bronze bust by Ton Buijnsters was erected in Haaren.
