= Antoine de Bourgogne =

Antoine de Bourgogne (died 1657), Latinized Antonius a Burgundia, was a prelate and author of emblem books in the 17th-century Low Countries.

== Life ==
He was born in Bruges to an illegitimate line of descent from the medieval dukes of Burgundy, and studied at the Jesuit college in his native city. He obtained degrees in Theology and Law, and was appointed to a canonry of St. Donatian's Cathedral reserved to noble graduates. He became archdeacon and in 1636 dean of the cathedral chapter. He died in Bruges on 29 May 1657 and was buried in the choir of the cathedral.

== Works ==
- Linguae vitia et remedia (Antwerp, Joannes Cnobbaert, 1631)
  - Published in Dutch as Ghebreken der Tonghe, ende Middelen om die te verbeteren (1631)
  - A modern edition of the Latin text, by Toon Van Houdt, was published by Brepols in 1999.
- Mundi lapis lydius (Antwerp, Widow of Joannes Cnobbaert, 1639)
  - Published in Dutch as Des Wereldts proef-steen (1643)
