= Alexander I of Bournonville =

Nobleman, diplomat, and conspirator (1585–1656)

Alexander, duke of Bournonville (1585–1656) was a nobleman, soldier, diplomat and conspirator with estates in both the Kingdom of France and the Low Countries.

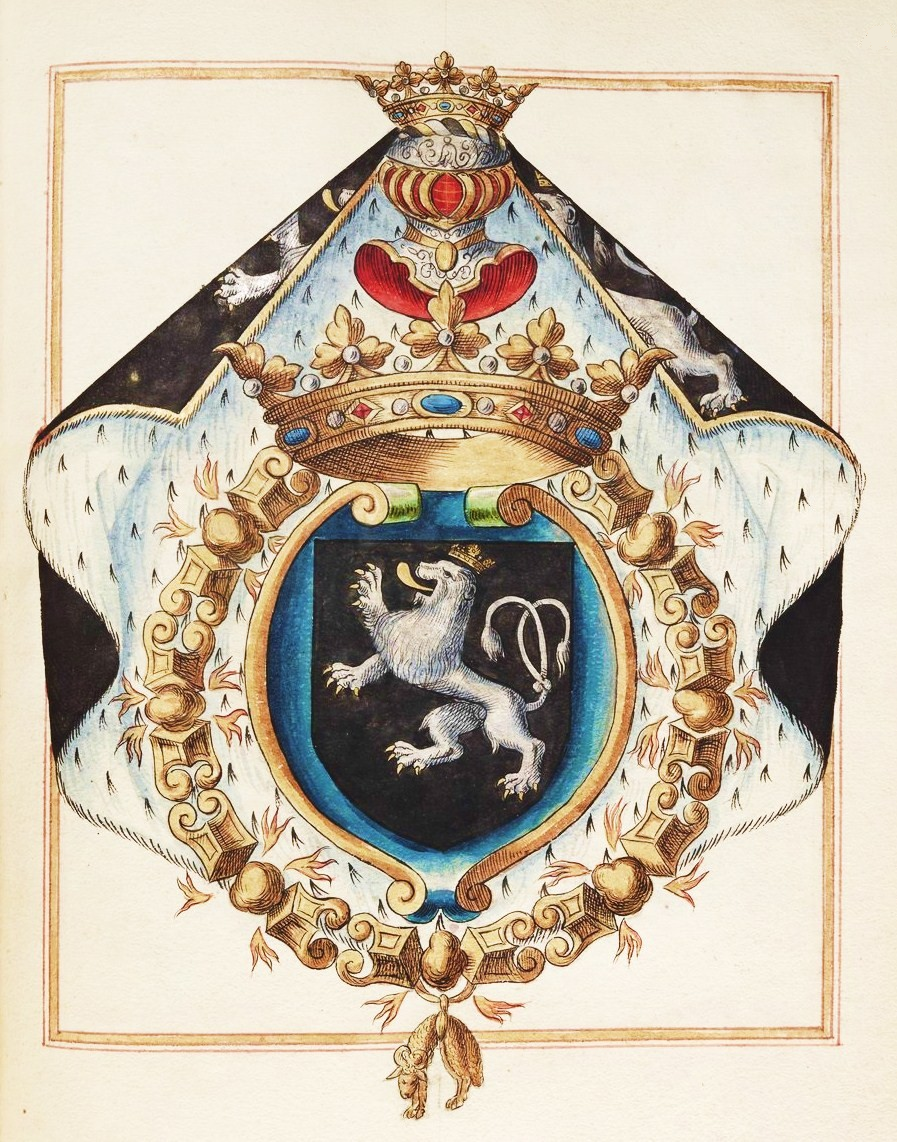
the Coat of arms of Alexander I of Bournonville

== Life ==
Bournonville was born on 4 November 1585, only son of Oudart de Bournonville, baron of Capres, and Marie-Christine of Egmont, daughter of Lamoral of Egmont. In 1600, Henri IV elevated his lordship of Bournonville to a duchy. Alexander was raised as a page boy and courtier at the courts of Paris, Brussels, Vienna and Florence, but received little formal schooling and was barely able to write. At the age of 20 he was appointed captain of a company of 300 Walloons, and a gentleman of the chamber to Archduke Albert. During the Bohemian Revolt he led his own regiment in imperial service, suffering combat injuries on 30 September 1620. In 1621–1622 he served in the Rhineland at the Siege of Jülich. Returning to the Low Countries, on 12 March 1622 he was one of the pallbearers at the funeral of Archduke Albert, who had died the previous year. On 29 August 1622, he took part in the Battle of Fleurus.

In 1624 Bournonville received the dedication of Aubert Le Mire's Rerum Belgicarum Annales. He twice served as ambassador extraordinary to Louis XIII of France, and once to Emperor Ferdinand II.

In May 1632, in what became known as the Conspiracy of Nobles, Bournonville plotted with the prince of Barbançon, prince of Espinoy and count of Egmont to overthrow Spanish rule and partition the Southern Netherlands between the Kingdom of France and the Dutch Republic. In March 1634, after his involvement in the conspiracy became known to the government, the Great Council of Mechelen convicted him of treason and confiscated his property. He fled to France, where he died in exile on 22 March 1656. His wife, Anne de Melun, withdrew to the Carmelite convent in Antwerp.

=== Marriage and children ===
From his marriage to Anne of Melun (1590-1666), Bournonville had fifteen children, including:

- Alexander II Hippolite of Bournonville (1616-1690), Count of Hénin-Liétard, Prince of Bournonville
- Ambrose Francis of Bournonville (1619-1693), Duke of Bournonville
- Wolfgang William of Bournonville, Viscount of Barlin
- Jan Frans Benjamin of Bournonville (1638-1719), Marquis of Bournonville, father of Miguel José
