= Louis of Egmont =

Prince of Gavre and noble conspirator (died 1645)

Louis of Egmont (commemorative medal)

Louis of Egmont, prince of Gavre (died 1654) was a noble conspirator from the Low Countries.

== Life ==
Louis was the son of Charles, 7th Count of Egmont, and Marie de Lens. In 1624 he became a knight of the Golden Fleece, despite which he became embittered at not being entrusted with any significant office either at court or in government.

Marie-Marguerite Berlaymont

He took part in the Conspiracy of Nobles (1632) with the prince of Espinoy, the prince of Barbançon, and the duke of Bournonville, and afterwards fled to France. Isabella Clara Eugenia, the head of the government in Brussels, made diplomatic protests against him being received at the French court, but no legal action was taken against him until 1638, when Philip IV of Spain took steps to have him prosecuted as a traitor. Unlike his fellow conspirators, he was never sentenced or punished. He died in exile at Saint-Cloud, outside Paris, on 27 July 1654.

His widow, Marie-Marguerite of Berlaymont, returned to Brussels after his death, dying there on 17 March 1654. Their son, Louis Philip of Egmont, inherited their properties and titles and became an influential member of the nobility not only in the Spanish Netherlands but in the wider Spanish Monarchy.
