= 1622 in Spain =

- Decades: 1600s; 1610s; 1620s; 1630s; 1640s
- See also: History of Spain; Timeline of Spanish history; List of years in Spain

Events in the year 1622 in Spain.

== Incumbents ==
- Monarch: Philip IV

== Events ==
- February 3 - Siege of Jülich ends with Spanish victory
- July 18-October 2 - Siege of Bergen-op-Zoom: Spanish defeated with 5,000 casualties
