= 1621 in Spain =

- Decades: 1600s; 1610s; 1620s; 1630s; 1640s
- See also: History of Spain; Timeline of Spanish history; List of years in Spain

Events in the year 1621 in Spain.

== Incumbents ==
- Monarch: Philip III until March 31, Philip IV since March 31

== Events ==
- August 10 - Eighty Years' War: Battle of Gibraltar (1621)
- September 5 - Thirty Years' War: beginning of the Siege of Jülich

== Deaths ==
- March 31 - Philip III (born 1578)
