= Guillaume de Melun, Prince of Espinoy =

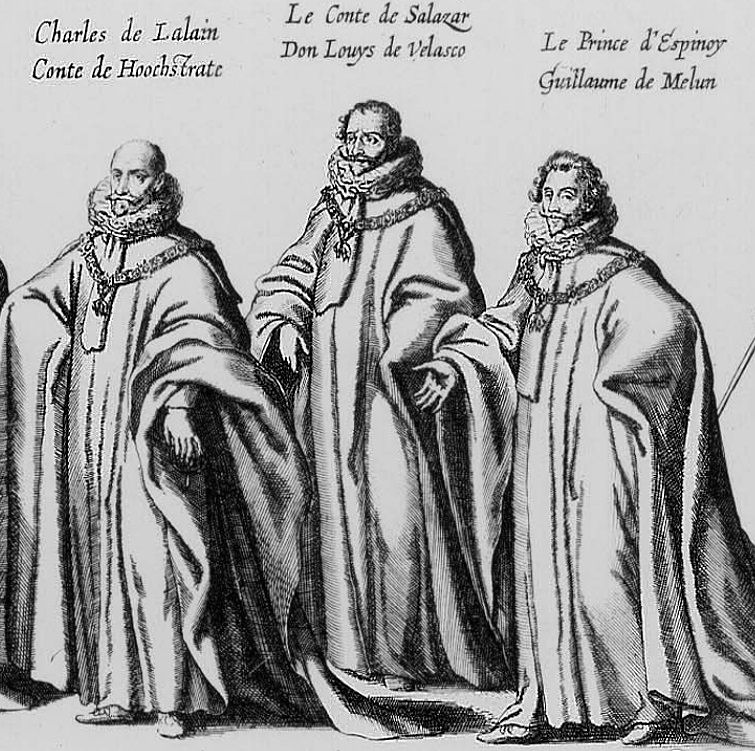
The prince of Espinoy (right), during the funeral of Archduke Albert VII

Guillaume de Melun (1588–1635) was a nobleman in the Spanish Netherlands, Governor and Grand Bailiff of the County of Hainaut, and Constable of Flanders, who conspired against the government.

== Life ==
Guillaume was the son of Pierre de Melun, Prince of Espinoy, by his second wife, Hippolyte de Montmorency. His father had taken the side of William the Silent during the Dutch Revolt and was living in exile in France at the time of his birth. During the negotiations for the Peace of Vervins (1598), Henry IV of France had pressed for Melun to be rehabilitated and to receive at least some part of the estates confiscated due to his father's part in the revolt.

In 1621 Espinoy became a knight of the Order of the Golden Fleece, and in 1622 was appointed bailiff of the County of Hainaut and to the Brussels Council of State.

In May 1632, in what became known as the Conspiracy of Nobles, he plotted with the prince of Barbançon, duke of Bournonville and count of Egmont to overthrow Spanish rule and partition the Southern Netherlands between the Kingdom of France and the Dutch Republic. The plot failed and Espinoy fled to France. On 2 May 1635 the Great Council of Mechelen in absentia sentenced him to death for high treason.

In the meantime, Espinoy was living under the protection of Louis XIII. He died at Saint-Quentin, Picardy, on 8 September 1635. His widow, Ernestine, retired to the Dominican convent at Abbeville, dying there on 12 June 1653.

=== Marriages and children ===
On 17 October 1612 Espinoy married Marie Mencie de Witthem, Marquise of Bergen op Zoom, and widow of Herman, Count of Bergh. She died on 28 July 1613, aged 31.
On 3 November 1615 he married a second time, with Ernestine of Arenberg, daughter of Charles de Ligne, 2nd Prince of Arenberg. Together they had eleven children that survived infancy:

- Claire-Marie (1616-1652), a nun
- Ambroise (1618-1641), Prince d'Épinoy, killed at the Siege of Aire-sur-la-Lys. No issue.
- Anne (1618-1679), known as Mademoiselle de Melun for her charity for the poor.
- Alexandre Guillaume (1619-1679) , Prince d'Épinoy, Marquis de Roubaix, military in the service of France. Had issue.
- Henri (died 1664), military in the service of Spain, killed in the Portuguese Restoration War. No issue.
- Charles-Alexandre-Albert (1624-1675), Count of Melun. Had issue.
- François Philippe (1627-1695), Marquis de Richebourg, military in the service of Spain. Order of the Golden Fleece.
- Isabelle Claire, canoness at Maubeuge
- Marie-Madeleine, canoness at Mons
- Françoise-Alberte, canoness at Mons
- Claire-Catherine. canoness at Mons
