= Sébastien de La Ruelle =

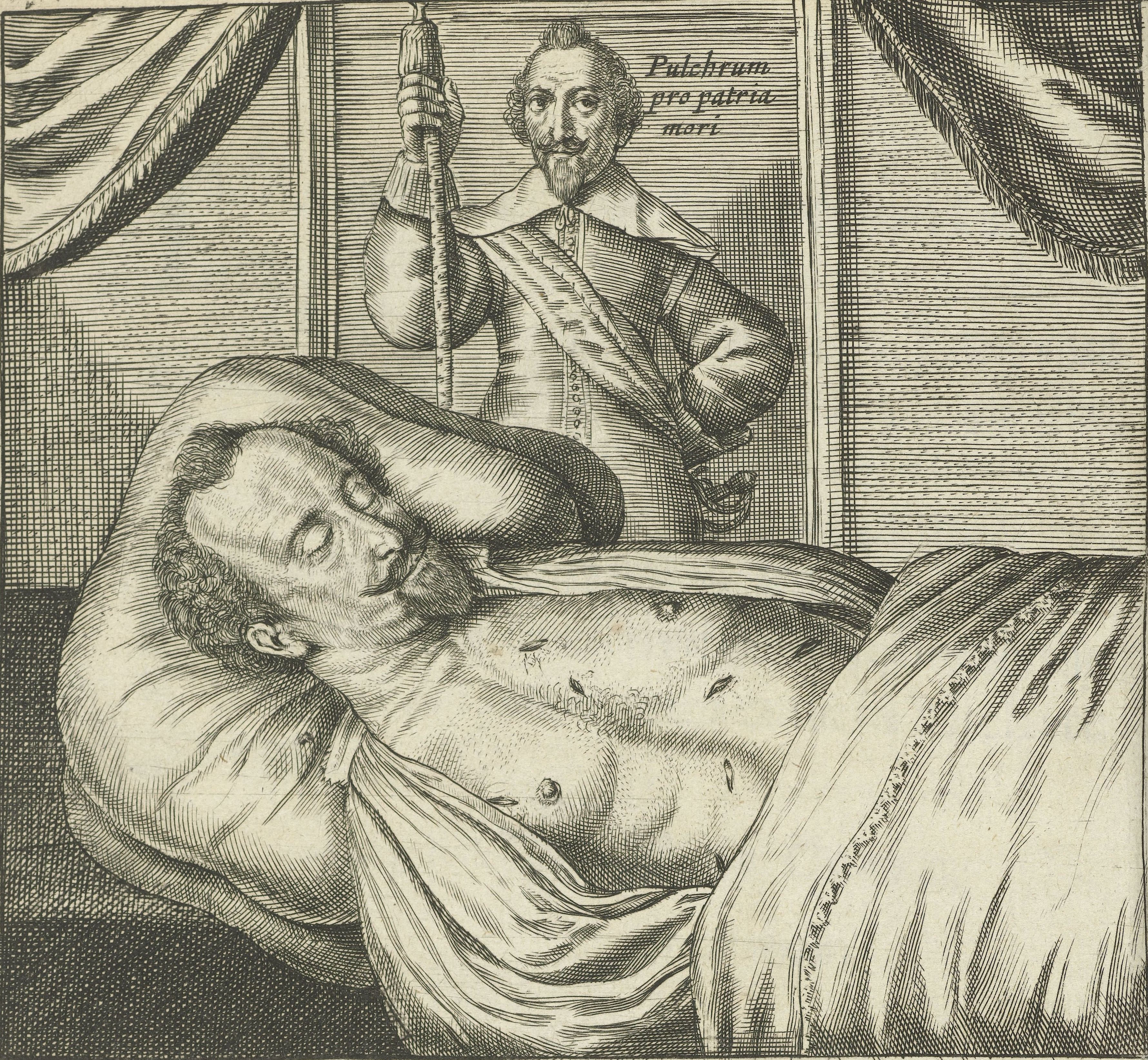
- Corpse of Sébastien de La Ruelle lying in state with wounds exposed. Print published by Jan van Hilten, 1637.

Mayor of Liège
- In office 1630/1635–1636

Personal details
- Died: 16 April 1637 Liège
- Citizenship: Liège
- Party: Grignoux
- Spouse: Ida de Cerf

Sébastien de La Ruelle (died 16 April 1637) was a mayor of the city of Liège who was assassinated for his opposition to the policies of the prince-bishop of Liège, Ferdinand of Bavaria.

== Office ==
La Ruelle was a leader of the "Grignoux" party in Liège, which sought a French alliance to counterbalance the prince-bishop's alliance with the Habsburgs, and opposed the growth of absolutism in city government. He was elected as one of the mayors of Liège in 1630, but the prince-bishop declared the election fraudulent and refused to confirm him in the office. La Ruelle was re-elected on 14 July 1635, after the outbreak of open war between France and the Habsburgs.

He left office on 24 July 1636, but was still identified as the head of the party that supported the presence of French troops in the prince-bishopric as a counterweight to Habsburg influence. He survived an attempt on his life on 3 November 1636, when a rider fired a shot in his direction that hit and injured his wife, Ida de Cerf.

== Assassination ==
In April 1637 he accepted an invitation to dine at the house of René de Renesse, 1st Count of Warfusée, who had been living in exile in Liège since the failure of the Conspiracy of Nobles (1632). Louis XIII's envoy in Liège, René-Louis de Ficquelmont, abbé de Mouzon, was also invited. At the banquet, after drinking the health of the King of France, La Ruelle was murdered by a party of Spanish soldiers that Warfusée had smuggled into Liège for the purpose.

When the murder became known, popular reaction was extreme. Warfusée was hanged out of hand by the mob, and they went on the rampage against prominent members of the "Spanish party", few of whom were implicated in the murder.

La Ruelle was buried in the church of St. Martin-en-Ile in Liège, with his funeral mass taking place in St. Lambert's Cathedral, Liège, on 2 May 1637.
