= Alphonse de Berghes =

- Archbishop of Mechelen
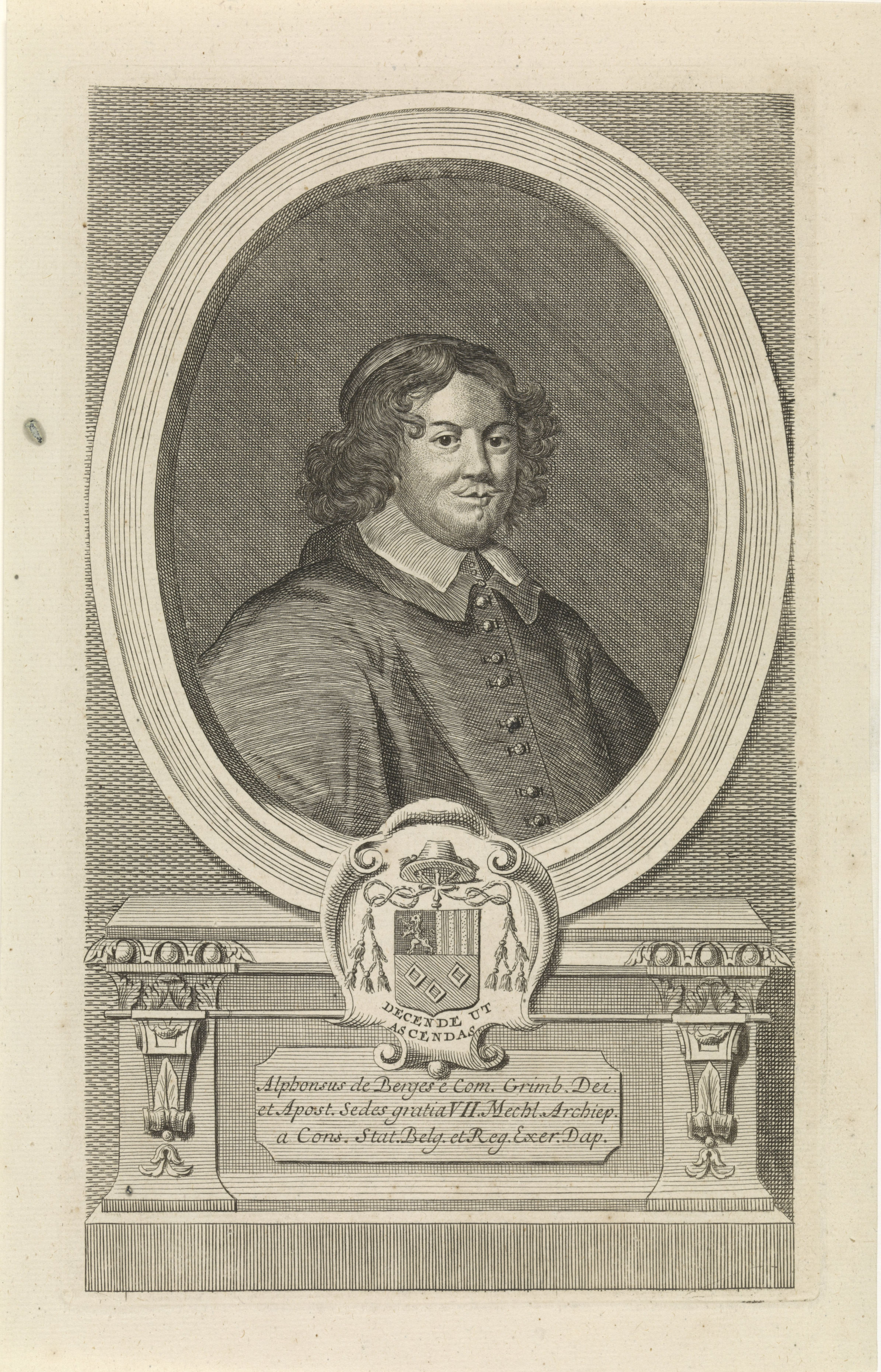
- Church: Catholic Church
- Archdiocese: Archdiocese of Mechelen
- In office: 17 November 1670 – 7 June 1689
- Predecessor: Jean de Wachtendonck
- Successor: Humbertus Guilielmus de Precipiano

Orders
- Ordination: 22 May 1650
- Consecration: 25 January 1671 by Ambrosius Capello

Personal details
- Born: 9 September 1624 Brussels, Habsburg Netherlands, Holy Roman Empire
- Died: 7 June 1689 (aged 64)

Alphonse or Alfons, Count de Berghes – Glymes (1624 – 7 June 1689) was Archbishop of Mechelen, Belgium. He was appointed 7th Archbishop in 1670.

== Family ==
Alphonse was born in Brussels, and was a member of the important house of Glymes, his descent was from the branch of Grimberghen. He was the son of Godefroi de Glymes, 1st Count of Grimberghen, named de Berghes, died 1635. His nephew was Philippe François de Berghes, 1st Prince of Grimberghen another nephew was Georges-Louis de Berghes was the 94th prince-bishop of Liège.

== Career ==
In 1631 he entered the court of pages of the Infanta Isabella of Spain. He entered the state of Clerus because of his weakness and poor health, however his father had foreseen a military career. He was provot in Nivelles and Canon of Tournai. in 1646 he received the tonsure of Jacobus Boonen, and was ordained priest by Mgr Villain of Tournay in 1650. In 1656 he was almoner of the royal governor and became in 1663 grand almoner and chaplain of King Felipe IV of Spain. He was ordained in 1671 as 7th Archbishop of Mechelen. In 1683 he ordained Humbertus Guilielmus de Precipiano as bishop. He was buried in the St. Rumbold's Cathedral, his grave sculpted by Jacob de Maeyer.

== See also ==
- Roman Catholic Archdiocese of Mechelen-Brussels

== Sources ==
- Alphonse de Berghes

Catholic Church titles
Preceded by Joannes Wachtendonck	7th Archbishop of Mechelen; 1670–1689	Succeeded by Humbertus Guilielmus de Precipiano
