= Louis Philip of Egmont =

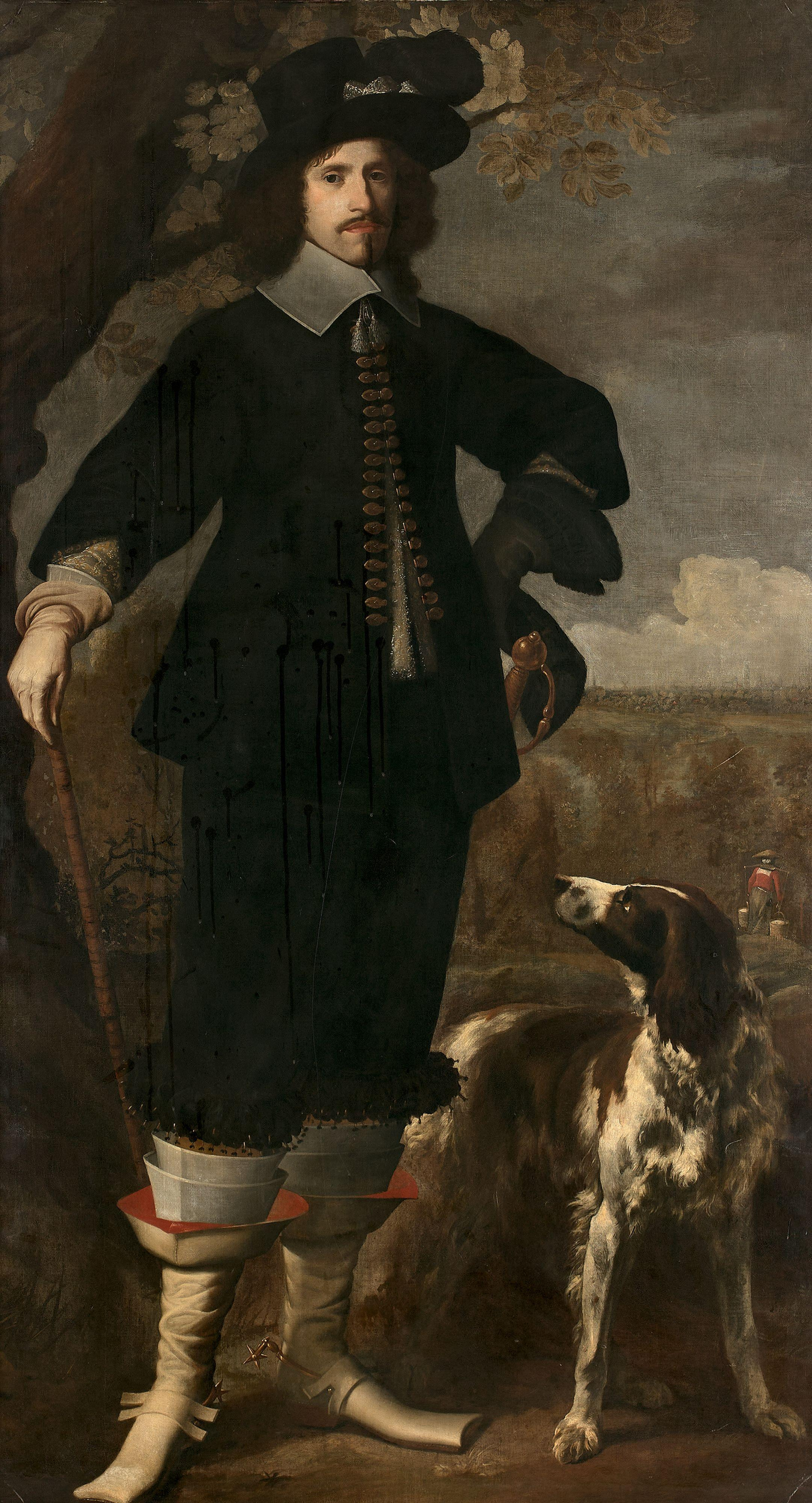
Louis Philip of Egmont by Simon Peter Tilemann (1645)

Louis Philip of Egmont (Brussels, 1622 - Cagliari, 7 March 1682) was 9th Count of Egmont, 6th Prince of Gavere and Lord of Zottegem and a Grandee of Spain and Knight of the Order of the Golden Fleece.

== Biography ==
Louis Philip was the sole son of Louis, 8th Count of Egmont and Maria Margaretha of Berlaymont.

In 1670 he was appointed Knight of the Golden Fleece by Charles II of Spain. He was Captain General of the Cavalry and Extraordinary Spanish Ambassador in England (1678-1679). Between 1679 and 1682 he was Viceroy of Sardinia. At the start of his reign, the island suffered from a lack of food and resources. Despite his efforts, he was not able to improve the situation.

The Count of Egmont died in March 1682, after a long illness, leaving Sardinia as oppressed by hunger as at the beginning. He was replaced in the position of Viceroy by Fray Diego Ventura Fernández, Archbishop of Cagliari.

He was succeeded as Count of Egmont and Lord of Gavere by his son Louis Ernest of Egmont.

=== Marriage and children ===
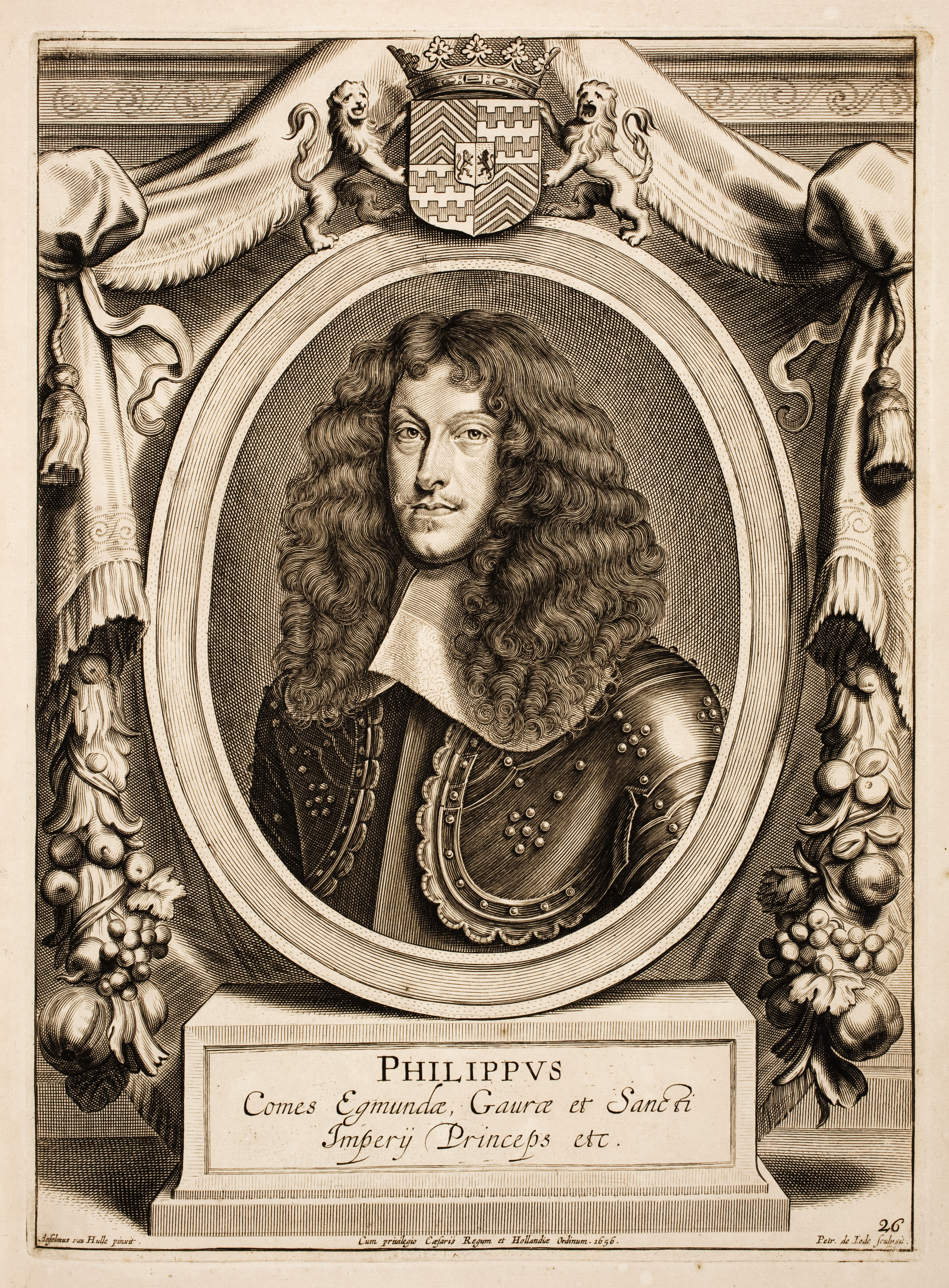
Louis Philip of Egmont, engraved by Pieter de Jode II after painting by Anselm van Hulle (1656)

On 4 August 1659 he married Maria Ferdinanda van Croÿ, daughter of Charles Philippe de Croÿ, IV marquis de Renty. From this marriage 4 children were born :

- Louis Ernest (1666-1693), 10th Count of Egmont, no issue
- Procop Francis (1664-1707), 11th Count of Egmont, no issue
- Maria Clara (1661-1714), married Procopo Pignatelli (1703-1743), from the House of Pignatelli
- Maria-Theresia, married to Albert Louis Ghislain de Trazegnies.

== Sources ==
- Afbeeldinge ende levensbeschryvinge van de Heeren en Graven van Egmondt by Wim Schmelzer (2002). pages 487-493.
