= Georges-Louis de Berghes =

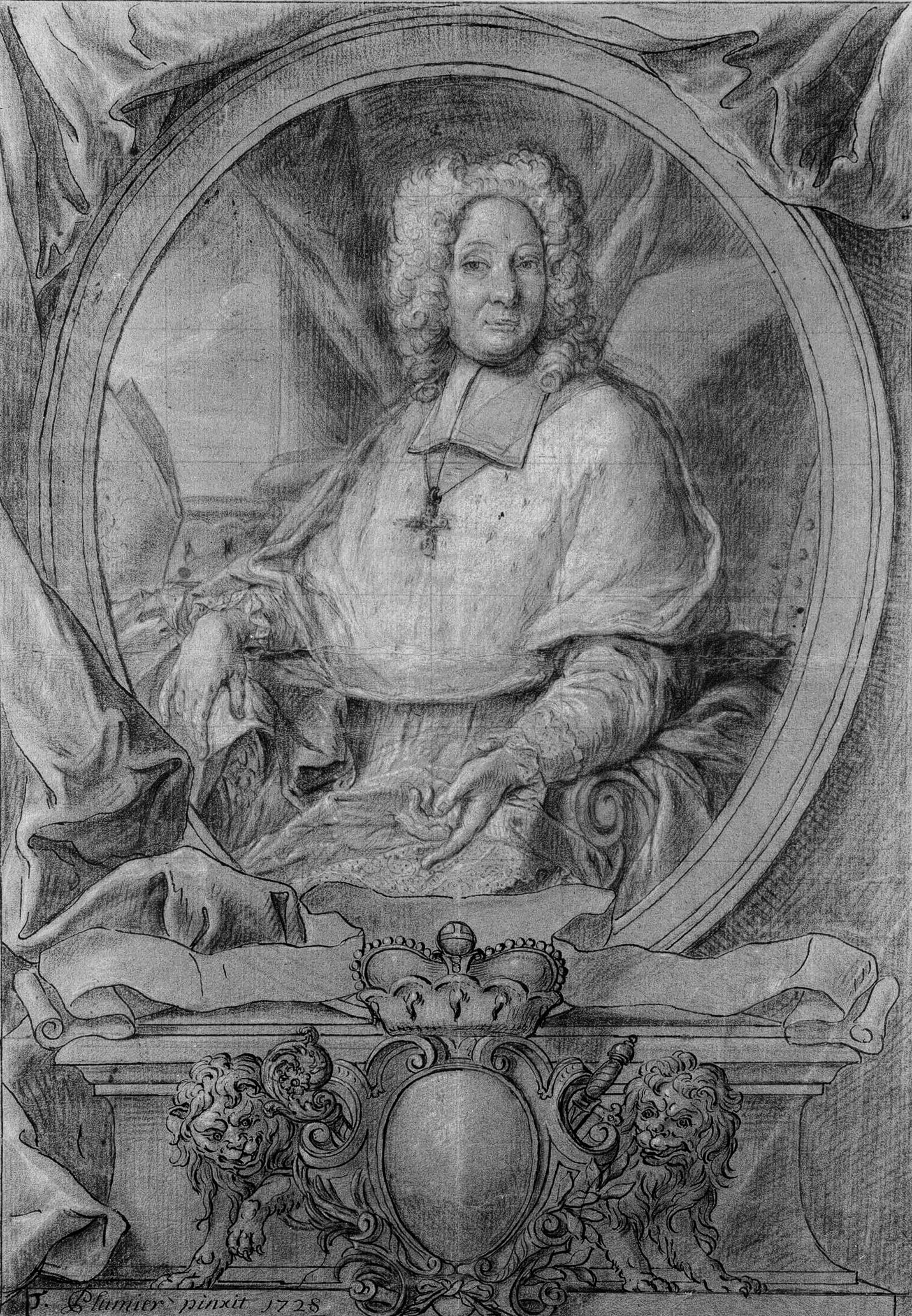
Portrait of Georges-Louis de Berghes by Edmond Plumier

Georges-Louis de Berghes (1662–1743) was the 94th prince-bishop of Liège.

== Life ==
De Berghes was born into the old House of Glymes on 5 September 1662, the son of Eugene de Berghes, 2nd Count of Grimberghen, brother of Philippe François de Berghes, 1st Prince of Grimberghen and a nephew of Bishop Alphonse de Berghes. Embarking on a military career, he became a lieutenant-colonel of cavalry in the service of the Spanish Netherlands. At the age of thirty-five he left the military to enter the priesthood, and in 1700 was appointed canon of Saint Lambert's Cathedral, Liège. In 1724 he was elected to succeed Joseph Clemens of Bavaria as prince-bishop.

As prince-bishop he restored the residence at Seraing as a summer palace, and instituted the death penalty for counterfeiting. He prohibited the priests of the diocese from entering inns when not themselves on journeys.

He died in Liège on 5 December 1743. As the last of his line, he left his considerable fortune to the poor of Liège. His executors, disappointing expectations of a bonanza, turned this into a fund, the interest on which was paid out to the poor annually.

Catholic Church titles
Regnal titles
Preceded by Joseph Clemens of Bavaria	Prince-Bishop of Liège; 1724–1743	Succeeded by Johann Theodor of Bavaria
