= Humbertus Guilielmus de Precipiano =

- Archbishop of Mechelen
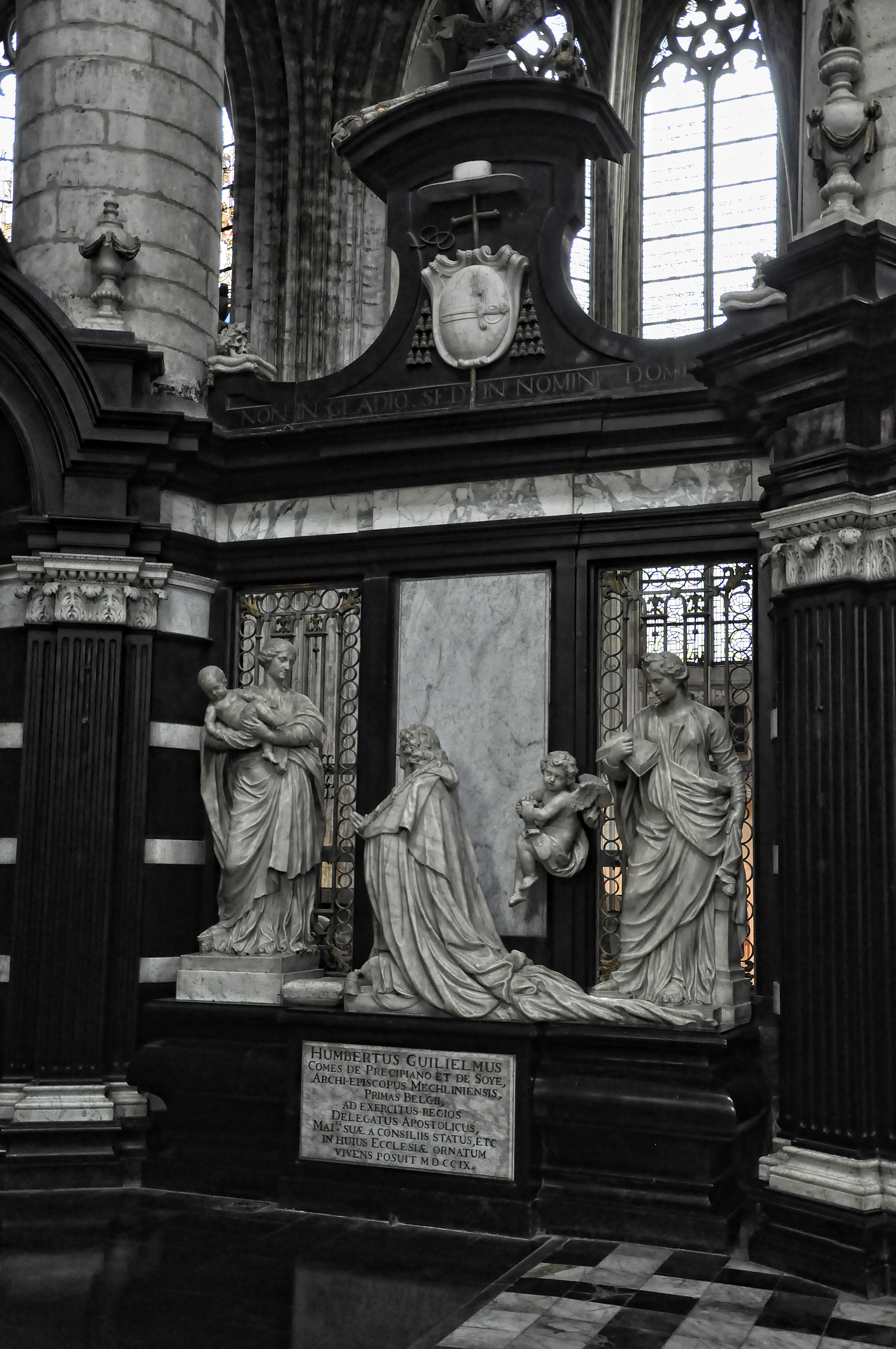
- Memorial to Humbertus Guilielmus de Precipiano by Michiel van der Voort the Elder at St. Rumbold's Cathedral
- Church: Catholic Church
- Archdiocese: Archdiocese of Mechelen
- In office: 8 May 1690 – 9 June 1711
- Predecessor: Alphonse de Berghes
- Successor: Thomas Philip Wallrad de Hénin-Liétard d'Alsace
- Previous post: Bishop of Bruges (1682-1690)

Orders
- Ordination: 27 March 1661
- Consecration: 21 March 1683 by Alphonse de Berghes

Personal details
- Born: 12 September 1627 Rougemont, County of Burgundy, Burgundian Circle, Holy Roman Empire
- Died: 9 June 1711 (aged 83) Mechelen, Lordship of Mechelen, Habsburg Netherlands, Holy Roman Empire

Humbertus Guilielmus de Precipiano (12 September 1627 in Rougemont, France – 9 June 1711 in Mechelen) was Archbishop of Mechelen (now in Belgium).

== Life ==
He was the son of Achilles de Precipiano, Baron of Soye and anna de Montrichard. He received the tonsure in 1641, and received the Prebendary as noble canon in Besançon Cathedral.

== Career ==
In 1660 he was elected abbot of Bellevaux abbey for the period of 1660–1682. During this period he was elected archdeacon of the royal Besançon chapter. In favor of a high career his ordinations followed quickly. In 1673 Mgr D' Allamont of Ghent died in Madrid and he hoped to receive from the Spanish court the wealthy diocese of Ghent. However the Regentes did refuse. In 1683 he was named bishop of Bruges and was ordained by Alphonse de Berghes.

He was appointed Archbishop on 12 July 1689, after royal approbation. He had previously been the chief councillor for the Netherlands and Burgundy for the Habsburg monarchy.

During his episcopate he did fight against the Jansenism priest and clergy. He died in Mechelen after pneumonia.

Catholic Church titles
Preceded by François de Baillencourt	Bishop of Bruges; 1682-	Succeeded by Guillem Bassery
Preceded by Alphonse de Berghes	8th Archbishop of Mechelen; 1690-1711	Succeeded by Thomas Philip Wallrad de Hénin-Liétard d'Alsace
