= René-Louis de Ficquelmont =

René-Louis de Ficquelmont (1589–1654), abbé de Mouzon, was commendatory abbot of Mouzon, Élan and Belval, and from 1624 to 1641 Louis XIII's diplomatic representative in the Principality of Liège.

== Life ==
Ficquelmont was born in 1589 to Jean de Fiquelmont and Claude de Joyeuse. In 1609 he was appointed commendatory abbot of Mouzon, Élan and Belval. He was clothed as a monk, and promoted the Benedictine reform of the Congregation of St. Vanne in the monasteries entrusted to him.

== Diplomatic career ==
In 1624 Ficquelmont arrived in Liège as the resident representative of the King of France. He was given the freedom of the city in 1627. In 1629 he convinced Richelieu of the desirability that France should guarantee Liège's neutrality in the face of incursions by both Dutch forces and the Army of Flanders. Mouzon spent lavishly in the French interest, receiving 67,750 livres between March 1635 and November 1639, but failed to convince the Liégeois to accept French intervention after the murder of Sébastien de La Ruelle in 1637. During the murder of La Ruelle, Mouzon had briefly been held prisoner by the murderers. Between October 1639 and April 1640 he was in Maastricht and then in Paris, to receive new instructions. In 1641 he was forced out of Liège by the resurgent Chiroux party, opposed to French intervention in the principality.

In 1654 he died of an apoplexy while at Luxeuil Abbey, and was buried there.
