= René de Renesse, 1st Count of Warfusée =

Dutch nobleman (ca. 1580 – 1637)

René III of Renesse, Viscount of Montenaecken, Baron of Gaesbeeck, Lord of Elderen (ca. 1580 – Liège, 17 April 1637) was a Dutch nobleman, who became the 1st Count of Warfusée in 1609. He acquired Gaasbeek Castle in 1615.

== Family ==
He was the eldest son of Guillaume de Renesse, lord of Warfusée and Anne of Rubempré, granddaughter of Charles IV, Lord of Rubempré. His Great-grand father was Henry III of Nassau-Breda, his grand mother was a legitimised daughter of Nassau.

In 1610 he married Alberta of Egmont, daughter of Charles, 7th Count of Egmont, Prince de Gavre. After his death he was followed by his son Alexander de Renesse, 2nd Count of Warfusée.

René de Renesse, 1st Count of Warfusée;
Married to Albertine of Egmont

  1. Maria de Renesse-Warfusée (c.1620-?);
    Married to Peter of Lalaing, Count of Rennenberg
  2. Florence-Marguerite de Renesse-Warfusée (c.1620-?);
    married to Eugène de Berghes, 2nd count of Grimbergen.
    1. Philippe François de Berghes, 1st Prince of Grimberghen
  3. Louise-Elisabeth de Renesse-Warfusée
  4. Alexander de Renesse, Baron of Gaesbeeck.

== Career ==
Renesse presided over the Council of Finances in the Netherlands under Philip IV of Spain. He also commanded a regiment of the Army of Flanders, as well as travelling regularly to Holland to the States-General of the Netherlands. He was involved in the Conspiracy of Nobles (1632) and made efforts to convince France to invade the Southern Netherlands in support of a planned revolt against Spanish rule. Accused of abuse of his office before the plan came to fruition, he fled to Liège and issued a manifesto against the government in Brussels. Charged with high treason, he was sentenced to banishment and his property was confiscated. He soon sought reconciliation with the Spanish government. On 16 April 1637 he invited the anti-Spanish mayor of Liège, Sébastien de La Ruelle, to a banquet to be held in his house the next day. Once Renesse had La Ruelle as a guest in his house, he had the mayor killed by hidden Spanish troops. Renesse was then murdered by an angry mob.

== Possessions ==
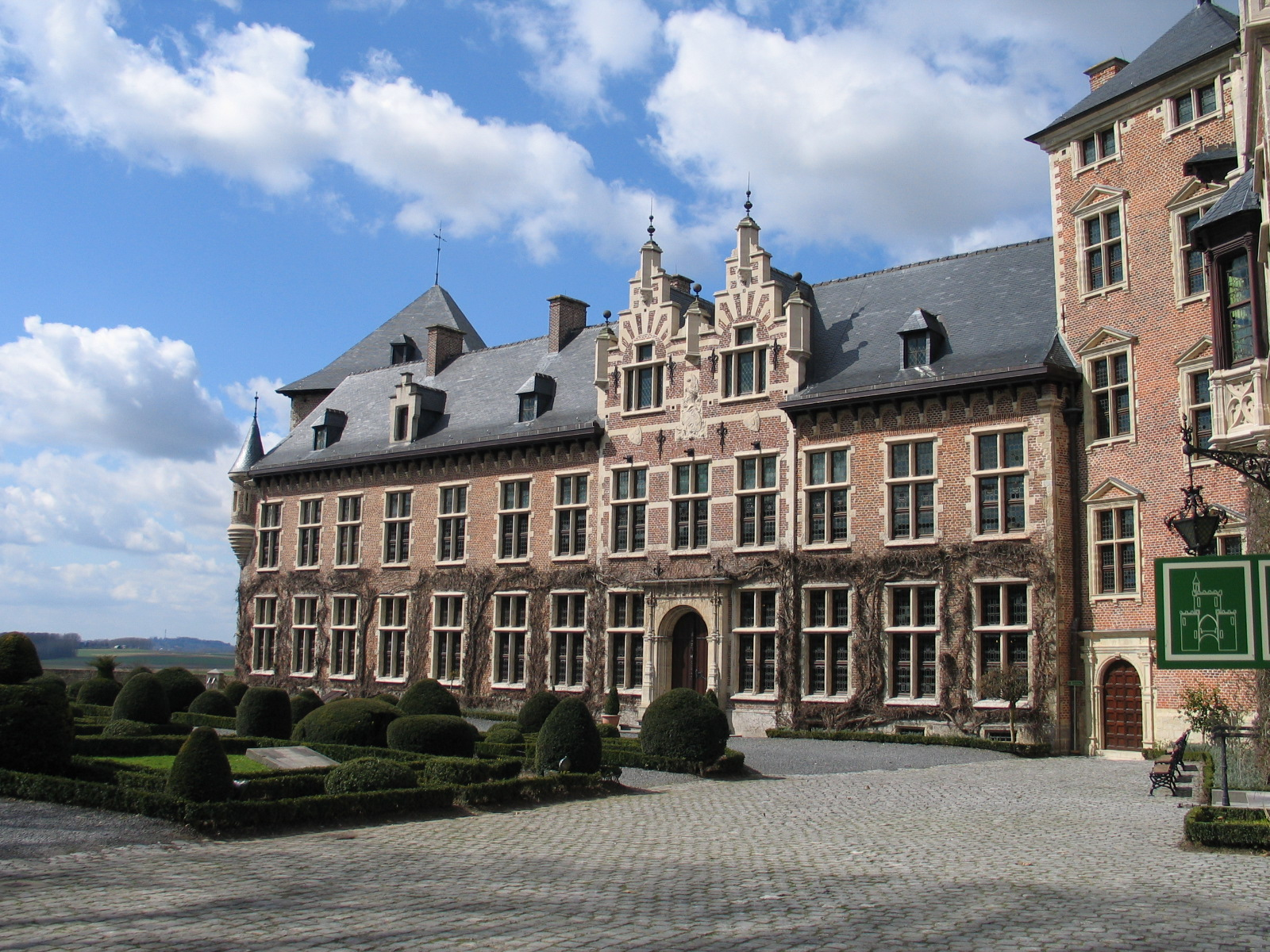
Inner Court of Gaasbeek Castle

- In 1609 he became 1st Count of Warfusée by decree of Emperor Rudolf II
- In 1615 he bought the estate of Heeze from Cleradius van Genève Lullin.
- In the same year he became the Baron of Gaesbeeck.

== Memory ==
Renesse's conspiracy to murder the mayor of Liège formed the plot of a novel by Hendrik Conscience, Le Bourgmestre de Liège (1865).

== Ancestry ==
Ancestors of René de Renesse, 1st Count of Warfusée

8. Frederic I of Renesse, Lord of Grimmerstein and Oostmalle
4. John of Renesse, Lord of Warfusée
9. Anne of Halmale, Lady of Elderen and Warfusée
2. Guillaume of Renesse
10. Henry III of Nassau-Breda
5. Isabella of Nassau
11. Marguerite van Schoondonck.
1. René de Renesse, 1st Count of Warfusée
12. Charles III of Rubempré, Viscount of Montenaecken
6. Charles IV of Rubempré, Viscount of Montenaecken
13. Jeanne de Boussies, Lady of Feluy.
3. Anne of Rubempré, Viscountess of Montenaecken
14. Philippe of Orley
7. Françoise of Orley, Lady of Seneffe
15. Ursula of Baden-Hohenburg
