= Anne de Melun =

Noblewoman from the Spanish Netherlands

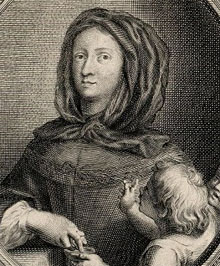

Anne de Melun (1619–1679), widely known as Mademoiselle de Melun, was a noblewoman from the Spanish Netherlands who founded and ran a hospital for the poor in rural France.

== Life ==
Anne was born in a castle near Mons, on 18 February 1619, the daughter of Guillaume de Melun, Prince of Espinoy, and Ernestine of Arenberg. On 21 June 1628 she was admitted to the chapter of canonesses of St Waltrude as a boarder. From 1630 onwards she was independently wealthy, having inherited the marquisate of Richebourg from a childless uncle. When her parents went into exile in France, their estates confiscated, she took charge of three of her younger sisters. One of these, Isabelle-Claire, joined the chapter of Sainte-Aldegonde in Maubeuge; another, Madeleine, became a canoness of St Waltrude (1644); the third died young.

After her father's death in exile in September 1635, Anne suffered a serious illness. Upon her recovery she founded and led an association of young women for charitable purposes, in particular hospital visiting. In 1649 she left Mons to join her mother and elder sister, Marie-Claire, at the Dominican convent in Abbeville. After trying her vocation in a number of places, in 1650 she settled at Baugé, in the duchy of Anjou, where Marthe de Peausse's attempt to found a hospital had foundered for lack of funds. Anne provided the sums needed to finish the hospital and set up an association of charitable ladies to run it. She lived in obscurity as a "servant of the poor" until 1663, when the division of the estates that had been restored to the family necessitated her to undertake a journey to Paris, Picardy and Flanders. A similar journey was necessary in 1665. In May 1671 she undertook a rescue mission to the ailing hospital at Beaufort.

She fell ill at Beaufort in 1679 and was carried back to Baugé, where she died on 13 August.
