= Philippe François de Berghes, 1st Prince of Grimberghen =

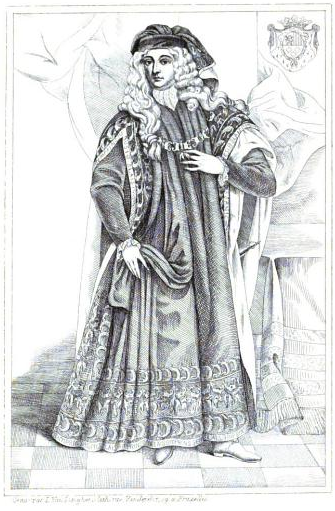
A portrait reproduced from Corneille Stroobant, Histoire de la commune de Feluy, Vol. 1 (1858)

Philippe François de Berghes (1646–1704) was a diplomat and military commander in the Spanish Netherlands and became the first bearer of the title of prince of Grimberghen.

== Family ==
He was born into the House of Glymes on 17 September 1646, the fifth child and eldest son of Eugène de Berghes, second count of Grimbergen, and Florence-Marguerite de Renesse, lady of Feluy and Écaussinnes. His grandfather René de Renesse, 1st Count of Warfusée is a descendant of Henry III of Nassau-Breda. He succeeded his father and became the third count of Grimbergen. He was the older brother of Georges-Louis de Berghes.

In 1674 he married Marie-Jacqueline de Lalaing, with whom he had three children. After his death he was succeeded by his son Alphonse Dominique François de Berghes, who became the 2nd Prince of Grimberghen and a Grandee of Spain.

His main residences were the princely castle in Grimbergen inherited from his father, and the castle of Feluy inherited from his mother.

== Career ==
Berghes served in the Army of Flanders, initially as commander of a Walloon regiment in the service of King Charles II of Spain, rising to the rank of general in 1684 and being appointed councillor of war. On 23 May 1686 the king rewarded him for 20 years of service with the title of prince. On 17 March 1694 he was created Knight of the Golden Fleece, being invested by Maximilian II Emanuel, Elector of Bavaria.

In 1688 he was sent as envoy to James II of England to congratulate him on the birth of the Prince of Wales. In 1693 he carried out a similar mission to the court of the King of Denmark.

In 1690 he was appointed governor and captain general of the county of Hainaut, directing the defence of Mons during the siege of 1691. He was appointed governor of Brussels on 17 April 1695, and led the defence of the city during the Bombardment of Brussels later that year.

He died in Brussels on 12 September 1704.

== Ancestry ==
Ancestors of Philippe François de Berghes, 1st Prince of Grimberghen

16. Georges of Glymes
8. Ferry de Glymes-Berghes, Baron of Grimberghen
17. Philippotte de 't Serclaes
4. Goderfoi de Glymes, 1st Count of Grimberghen
18. Geert Sterck, Lord of Bucquoy
9. Anne Sterck, Lady of Bucquoy
19. Jeanne van Dale
2. Eugène de Berghes, 2nd Count of Grimbergen
20. Jean II de Hornes, Lord of Bassignies
10. Gerard of Hornes (1560-1612), 1st Count of Bassignies
21. Marie de St-Aldegonde (1535-1564)
5. Horonine-Marguerite of Hornes-Baussignies, Lady of Arquennes
22. Antoine of Witthem
11. Honorine de Witthem, Lady of Arquennes
23. Jeanne of Noyelles
1. Philippe François de Berghes, 1st Prince of Grimberghen
24. John of Renesse, Lord of Warfusée
12. Guillaume of Renesse
25. Isabella of Nassau; Princess of Orange-Nassau.
6. René de Renesse, 1st Count of Warfusée.
26. Charles IV of Rubempré, Viscount of Montenaecken
13. Anne of Rubempré, Lady of Montenaecken
27. Françoise d'Orley
3. Florence-Marguerite de Renesse
28. Lamoral, Count of Egmont
14. Charles, 7th Count of Egmont; Prince de Gavre
29. Sabina, Duchess of Bavaria
7. Albertine of Egmont
30. Gilles of Lens, Baron of Aubigny
15. Marie de Lens, Lady of aubigny
31. Eleonore of Douvrin, Lady of Flers
