= Corneille Stroobant =

Corneille Stroobant (1811–1890) was a Belgian priest-scholar with a particular interest in local history and genealogy. He was a brother of Eugène Edouard Stroobant, member of the Belgian Chamber of Representatives and Flemish author.

== Life ==
Stroobant was born in Turnhout on 6 November 1811, and studied at a secondary school there. He enrolled in the Archdiocesan Major Seminary, Mechelen, on 2 September 1833, and on 2 May 1836 was appointed to teach in the minor seminary in Hoogstraten. From 1845 to 1879 he was a missionary in Derby, England. In retirement he lived in Brussels and dedicated his time to further research, publishing numerous articles in the Annales de l'Académie Royale d'Archéologie de Belgique and in the Mélanges bibliographiques inédits. He died in Brussels on 20 October 1890 and was buried in his family's vault in Wemmel.

== Works ==
- Notice historique et généalogique sur les seigneurs d'Oisquercq et de Val (1848)
- Notice sur la fondation de la première messe dans l'église paroissiale de Hal-Notre-Dame (1849)
- Notice historique et généalogique sur les seigneurs de Braine-le-Château et Haut-Ittre (1849)
- Notice historique et généalogique sur les seigneurs de Tyberchamps (1851)
- Notices sur les quatre anciennes vicomtés de Hollande (1853)
- Histoire de la commune de Virginal (1853)
- Histoire de la commune de Feluy (1858)

== Memberships ==
Corneille Stroobant was a member of numerous historical and literary learned societies: the Société pour l’Émancipation intellectuelle, Brussels; Tael- en letterlievend Genootschap De Dageraed, Turnhout (1843); Académie d’Archéologie de Belgique, Antwerp (1843); Nederduitsch Tael- en Letterkundig Genootschap, Brussels (1843); Leuvensch Tael- en Letterlievend Genootschap, Leuven (1844); Société Académique de Cherbourg (1847); Sociedad Arqueolójica Española, Madrid (1849); Société des Sciences, des Arts et des Lettres du Hainaut, Mons (1850); Historisch Genootschap, Utrecht (1851 en 1857); British Academy of Universal Industry, Science and Arts, London (1851); Académie Belge d’Histoire et de Philologie, Antwerp (1851); Société historique et archéologique à Maestricht, Maastricht (1854); Société des Antiquaires de l’Ouest, Poitiers (1854); Société des Archivistes de France, Paris (1855); Société d’Histoire et des Beaux-Arts de la Flandre maritime de France, Bergues (1856); Société scientifique et littéraire du Limbourg, Tongeren (1858).
