= Albert de Ligne, Prince of Barbançon =

Albert de Ligne Prince of Barbançon and Arenberg
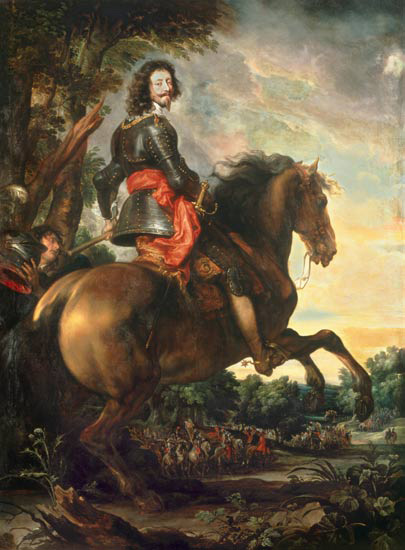
- Albert, Prince of Barbançon, portrait by Anthony van Dyck
- Born: 1600
- Died: 1674 (aged 73–74); Madrid
- Burial place: Capuchin Convent of Patience, Madrid
- Military career
- Allegiance: Spanish Habsburg
- Service years: 1618–1634, 1658–1660
- Unit: Barbançon Regiment
- Commands: Cavalry captain; Colonel of his own regiment

Albert de Ligne (1600–1674), Prince of Barbançon and Arenberg, knight of the Golden Fleece, was a Netherlandish nobleman and military commander in the Thirty Years' War and the Eighty Years' War.

== Life ==
Ligne was the son of Robert de Ligne, Baron of Barbançon (second son of Jean de Ligne), by Claude, Countess of Salm. His father was commander of Archduke Albert's honour guard and colonel of a cavalry regiment. Shortly before his death, in 1614, the lordship of Barbançon became a principality. On Albert's accession he was therefore Prince of Barbançon.

In 1618 the young prince entered royal service under Charles Bonaventure de Longueval, Count of Bucquoy, for the campaign against the Bohemian Revolt that opened the Thirty Years' War. In 1620 he was commissioned as captain of a company of cuirassiers in Ambrogio Spinola's Palatinate campaign. In 1622 Isabella Clara Eugenia, governor general of the Spanish Netherlands, appointed him general of a Walloon regiment. During the campaign of 1625 he became general in chief of the bandes d'ordonnance. On 19 June 1627 he was awarded the Golden Fleece by Philip IV of Spain, being invested in Brussels on 18 June 1628. Barbançon raised a regiment at his own expense with the intention of supporting Charles Emmanuel I, Duke of Savoy in the War of the Mantuan Succession, but with the changing situation in Italy and the Low Countries he remained in the Low Countries to fight the Dutch.

On 27 April 1634 the Marquis of Aytona, on Philip IV's orders, had Barbançon arrested for having corresponded with Cardinal Richelieu in the context of the Conspiracy of Nobles (1632). Information against him had been provided by Balthazar Gerbier, Charles I of England's resident agent in Brussels. After years in prison, mostly in the citadel of Antwerp, but some of the time in Vilvoorde Castle and the castle of Rupelmonde, the prince was ordered released by acting governor general Francisco de Melo on 24 December 1642. He had been repeatedly investigated and questioned, but never formally brought to trial or sentenced. Only in 1658 was he again commissioned as a royal officer, being appointed commander of the garrison of Ypres and captain general of artillery. Barbançon died in Madrid in April 1674.

== Marriage and family ==
The Prince of Barbançon married Marie de Barbançon, Viscountess of Dave, daughter and heiress to Everard de Barbançon and Louise of East Frisia. Together they had two children, Octave-Ignace and Isabelle-Marie-Magdalene.
