= Conspiracy of Nobles (1632) =

Plot to divide the Spanish Netherlands between France and the Dutch Republic

- Date: 1632
- Location: Spanish Netherlands
- Outcome: failed

The Conspiracy of Nobles (French: La conspiration des nobles) was a plot in 1632 to divide the Spanish Netherlands between the Dutch Republic and the Kingdom of France. The Belgian aristocrats behind the plot were frustrated at their exclusion from the decision-making process by Gaspar de Guzmán, Count-Duke of Olivares, who was a chief minister to the Philip IV of Spain, sovereign ruler of the Spanish Netherlands. Among the conspirators were Counts Hendrik van den Bergh and René de Renesse, 1st Count of Warfusée, the only two of the conspirators to act.

The plan came to nothing, but the existence of the conspiracy had a major impact on subsequent political developments, and the defection of Hendrik van den Bergh was a serious blow to the military leadership of the Army of Flanders and the prestige of the Habsburg dynasty. Only in 1634 did the Spanish government begin to gain a picture of the extent of the plot, through revelations made by Balthazar Gerbier, Charles I of England's resident agent in Brussels.

On the basis of Gerbier's denunciations, Albert de Ligne, Prince of Barbançon, spent eight years in prison (1634–1642) without being brought to trial. Guillaume de Melun, Prince of Espinoy, fled to France and was sentenced to death for high treason in absentia. The Duke of Aarschot, who had known of the plot but had dissuaded the conspirators, spent his final years under house arrest in Madrid for having failed to denounce it.

== Sources ==
- Paul Janssens, "L'Échec des tentatives de soulèvement aux Pays-Bas sous Philippe IV (1621–1665)", Revue d'histoire diplomatique 92 (1978): 110-129.
- Paul Janssens, "La fronde de l'aristocratie belge en 1632", in Rebelión y Resistencia en el Mundo Hispánico del Siglo XVII, edited by Werner Thomas with Bart De Groof (Leuven University Press, 1992), pp. 23-40.
- René Vermeir, "Le Duc d'Arschot et les conséquences de la conspiration des nobles (1632-1640)", in Beleid en bestuur in de oude Nederlanden: Liber Amicorum Prof. Dr. M. Baelde, edited by Hugo Soly and René Vermeir (Ghent, 1993), pp. 477-489.
