= 1636 in Belgium =

- Decades: 1630s; 1650s
- See also: Other events of 1636; List of years in Belgium

Events in the year 1636 in the Spanish Netherlands and Prince-bishopric of Liège (predecessor states of modern Belgium).

== Incumbents ==
=== Habsburg Netherlands ===
Monarch – Philip IV, King of Spain and Duke of Brabant, of Luxembourg, etc.

Governor General – Cardinal-Infante Ferdinand of Austria

=== Prince-Bishopric of Liège ===
Prince-Bishop – Ferdinand of Bavaria

== Events ==
April

- 29 April – Dutch forces retake Schenkenschans.

July

- 2 July – Army of Flanders goes onto the offensive in the Franco-Spanish War (1635–59), invading French territory.
- 17 July – People of Liège appeal to Pope Urban VIII against imperial troops called in by prince-bishop Ferdinand.

August

- 5 August – Crossing of the Somme by the Army of Flanders.
- 7 August – Corbie invested.
- 15 August – Corbie taken.

November

- 14 November – French forces retake Corbie.

== Publications ==
- Lazarus Marcquis, Volcomen tractaet van de peste (Antwerp, Caesar Joachim Trognaesius) – a treatise on the pestilence.
- Aubertus Miraeus, Rerum Belgicarum chronicon (Antwerp, Willem Lesteens)
- Nicolaus Vernulaeus, Fritlandus Tragoedia (Leuven, Josse Coppens)
- Nicolaus Vernulaeus, Dissertatio oratoria de causis occupatae a Francis Lotharingiae (Leuven, Jacob AZegers)

== Works of art ==
- Anthony van Dyck – Charles I in Three Positions, now in the Royal Collection.
- Peter Paul Rubens
  - Hercules' Dog Discovers Purple Dye, now in the Musée Bonnat, Bayonne.
  - Helena Fourment with Children, now in the Louvre Museum, Paris.
  - Saturn, now in the Museo del Prado, Madrid.
  - The Rainbow Landscape, now in the Wallace Collection, London.
  - A View of Het Steen in the Early Morning, now in the National Gallery, London.

== Births ==
January

- 12 January – Jean-Baptiste Monnoyer, painter (died 1699)

June

- 22 June – Albertus Clouwet, engraver (died 1679)

== Deaths ==
Date uncertain

- Philippe de Caverel (born 1555), abbot
- Matthijs Langhedul, organ builder
- Joannes Woverius (born 1576), councillor

January

- 19 January – Marcus Gheeraerts the Younger (born 1561/2), painter

June

- 21 June – Justus de Harduwijn (born 1582), poet
