= Saturn (disambiguation) =

Saturn is the sixth planet from the Sun.

Saturn also commonly refers to:

- Saturn (mythology), an Ancient Roman god
- Sega Saturn, a video game console
- Saturn Awards, an award presented by the Academy of Science Fiction, Fantasy and Horror Films
- Saturn (rocket family)

Saturn may also refer to:

== Transportation ==
- Saturn Corporation, a brand of cars
- Saturn Airways, an American air carrier
- Lockheed Saturn, a civil airliner transport first flown in 1946
- NPO Saturn, a Russian jet engine manufacturer
  - Saturn AL-31, a family of military turbofan engines developed by NPO Saturn
- MV Saturn, a 1977 Scottish ferry
- RFA Stromness (A344) or USNS Saturn, a British Royal Navy fleet stores ship sold to the United States Military Sealift Command

== Literature ==
- Saturn (magazine), a science fiction magazine
- Saturn, a novel in Ben Bova's Grand Tour series
- Saturn, a novel by Edwin Roxburgh

== Places ==
- Saturn, Romania, a resort in Romania
- Saturn, Indiana, an unincorporated community in Whitley County, Indiana, United States

== Computing and electronics ==
- Saturn (software), traffic assignment software
- Saturn (retailer), a German electronics store
- SATURN Development Group, a microchip industry forum
- HP Saturn, the CPU in certain Hewlett-Packard programmable calculators
- Saturn Communications, a defunct Australian and New Zealand communications company

== Music ==
- Saturn (album), a 2018 album by Nao
- "Saturn" (Sufjan Stevens, Bryce Dessner, Nico Muhly and James McAlister song), from Planetarium (2017)
- "Saturn" (SZA song), from Lana (2024)
- "Saturn", a single by Ganymed
- "Saturn", a 1997 song by Skillet from Skillet
- "Saturn", a song by Sleeping at Last from Space 2
- "Saturn", a song by Stevie Wonder from Songs in the Key of Life
- "Saturn", a song by Xiu Xiu from La Forêt

== Fictional characters ==
- Mr. Saturn, a fictional alien species in the video game EarthBound
- Sailor Saturn or Hotaru Tomoe, a Sailor Moon character
- St. Jaygarcia Saturn, a One Piece character

== Other uses ==
- Saturn (alligator) (1936-2020), an American alligator at the Moscow Zoo, Russia
- Saturn (astrology), a symbolic planet and element in astrology and alchemy
- Saturn (detachment), a Russian Ministry of Justice special forces unit
- Saturn (Rubens), a 1636 painting by Peter Paul Rubens
- Second-generation Anti-jam Tactical UHF Radio for NATO, a successor product of HAVE QUICK
- Saturn FC, an American soccer club
- FC Saturn Ramenskoye, a Russian football club
- Zeuxidia amethystus or common Saturn, a species of butterfly
- Zeuxidia aurelius or giant Saturn, a species of butterfly
- Perry Saturn, ring name of American professional wrestler Perry Arthur Satullo (born 1966)
- A Bayer CropScience brand name for benthiocarb

== See also ==
- Operation Little Saturn, a Soviet offensive during World War II
- Saturn Girl, a comic book superhero
- Saturn Queen, a comic book supervillain
- Salvation Army Team Emergency Radio Network (SATERN)
- Sadurn, an American indie rock band
- Saturna (disambiguation)
- Saturnalia
