= Het Steen (Elewijt) =

Castle in Belgium

Coordinates: 50°57′33.63″N 4°28′38.76″E

- Elewijt, Flemish Brabant, Belgium
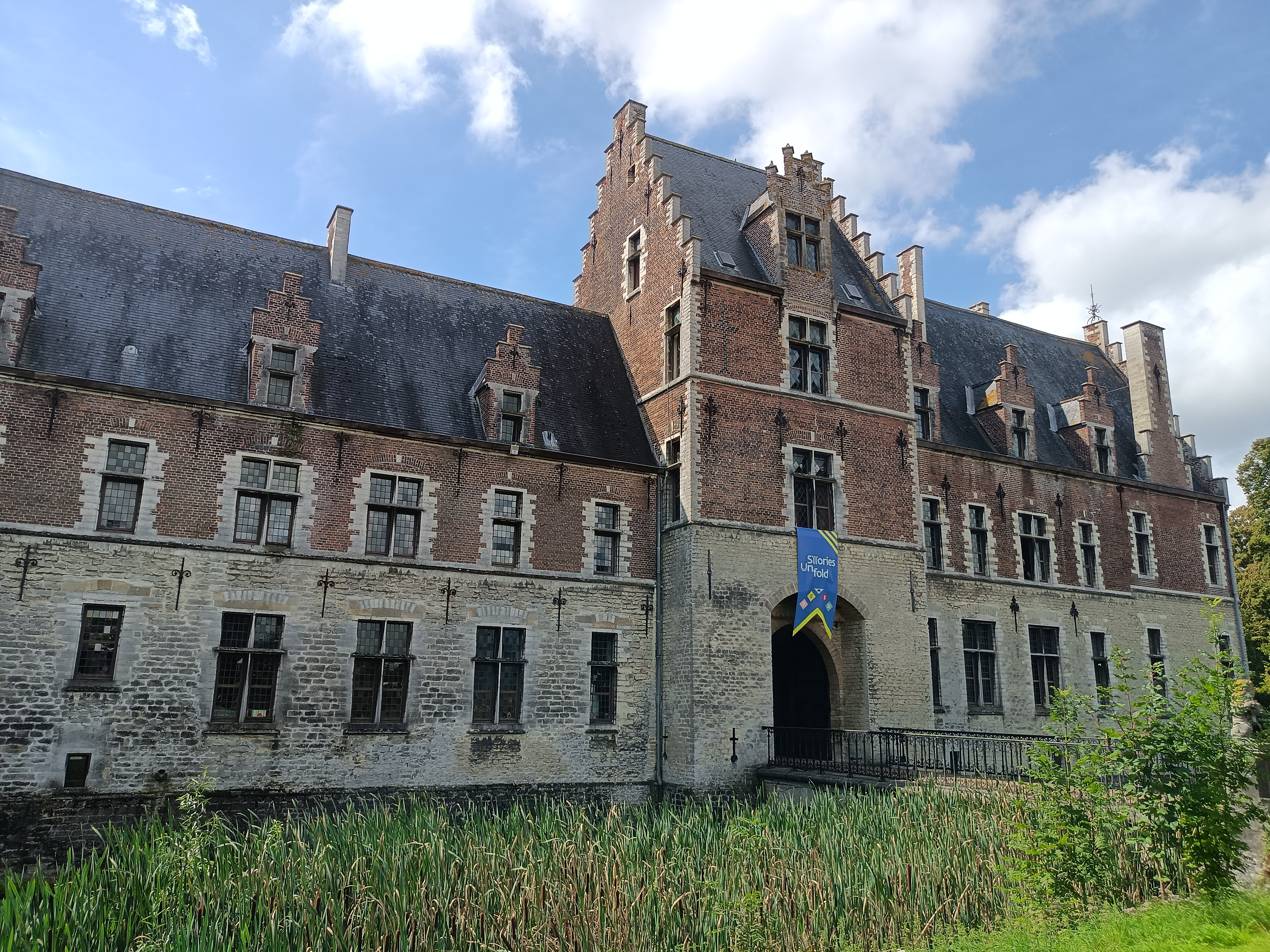
- Front of Het Steen, pictured in 2023

Site information
- Type: Castle
- Owner: Flemish Region

Site history
- Built: Original castle: 1304

Garrison information
- Occupants: Peter Paul Rubens

Het Steen (Dutch; lit. 'the stone' or 'the rock'), also referred to popularly as the Rubens Castle (Rubenskasteel), is a castle in Elewijt, Flemish Brabant, in Belgium. It is notable as the country house of the artist Peter Paul Rubens between 1635 and his death in 1640. Het Steen itself features in several of Rubens's late landscape paintings.

== Early history ==
The castle's origins date to 1304. A small stream called the Baerebeek runs through the castle grounds.

== Rubenskasteel ==
The painter Peter Paul Rubens purchased Het Steen as a country estate in May 1635 for 93,000 guilders along with the historic noble title Lord (Seigneur) of Steen. Rubens intended to use the castle as a summer residence as he already owned a substantial mansion in Antwerp about two hours away by carriage.

Rubens moved into the castle with his second wife Helena Fourment and family in November 1635. He died in 1640.

The castle features in a number of Rubens's most celebrated landscape paintings including The Rainbow Landscape (Wallace Collection, 1636), A View of Het Steen in the Early Morning (National Gallery, 1636), and Tournament in Front of Steen Castle (Louvre, 1638-40).

A View of Het Steen in the Early Morning (1636) (National Gallery)

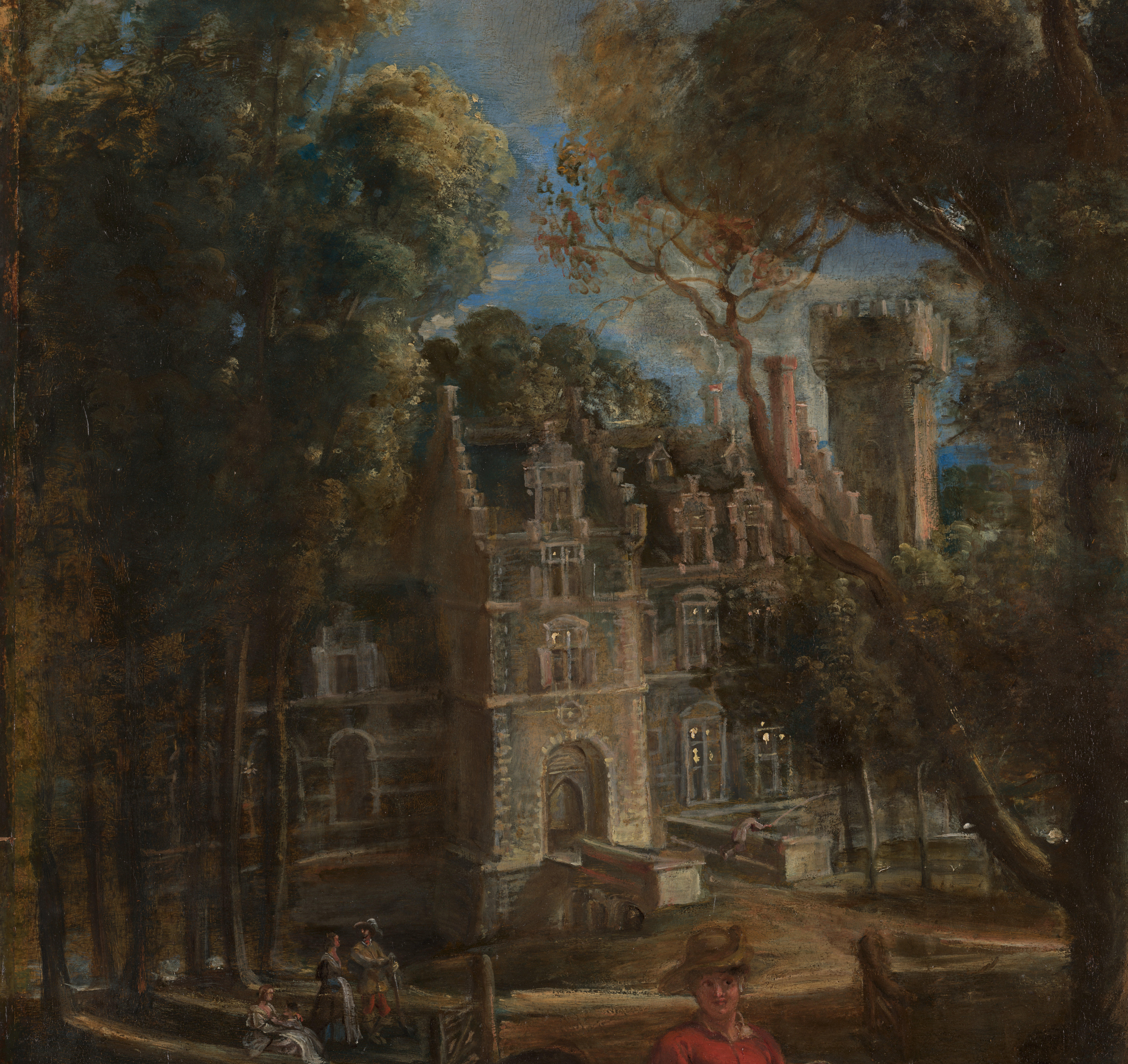
Detail of the castle from A View of Het Steen in the Early Morning

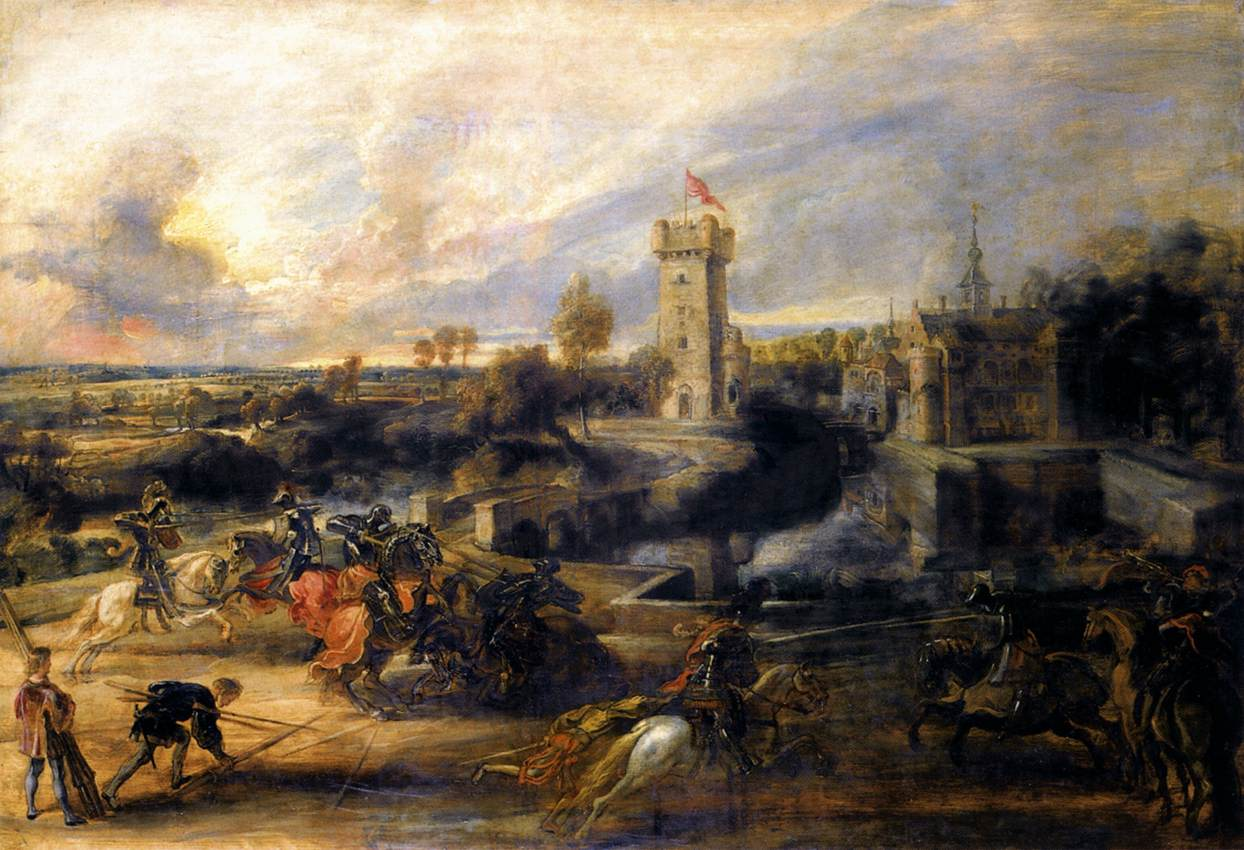
Tournament in Front of Steen Castle (1638-40) (Louvre)

== Subsequent history ==
After Rubens's death, the castle passed to a succession of owners. It was used as a prison for a time. At the time of the German invasion of Belgium in August 1914, four civilians were murdered outside the castle by German forces at the same time as the massacre of civilians in nearby villages including Elewijt. It was declared a listed monument in 2016.

The castle was put up for private sale in 2021 at an undisclosed asking price, speculated to be 4 million euros. After being listed for sale in 2016, it was purchased by the Flemish Region in 2019.

Nowadays, the castle is privately owned, not open for visits but rented for events.

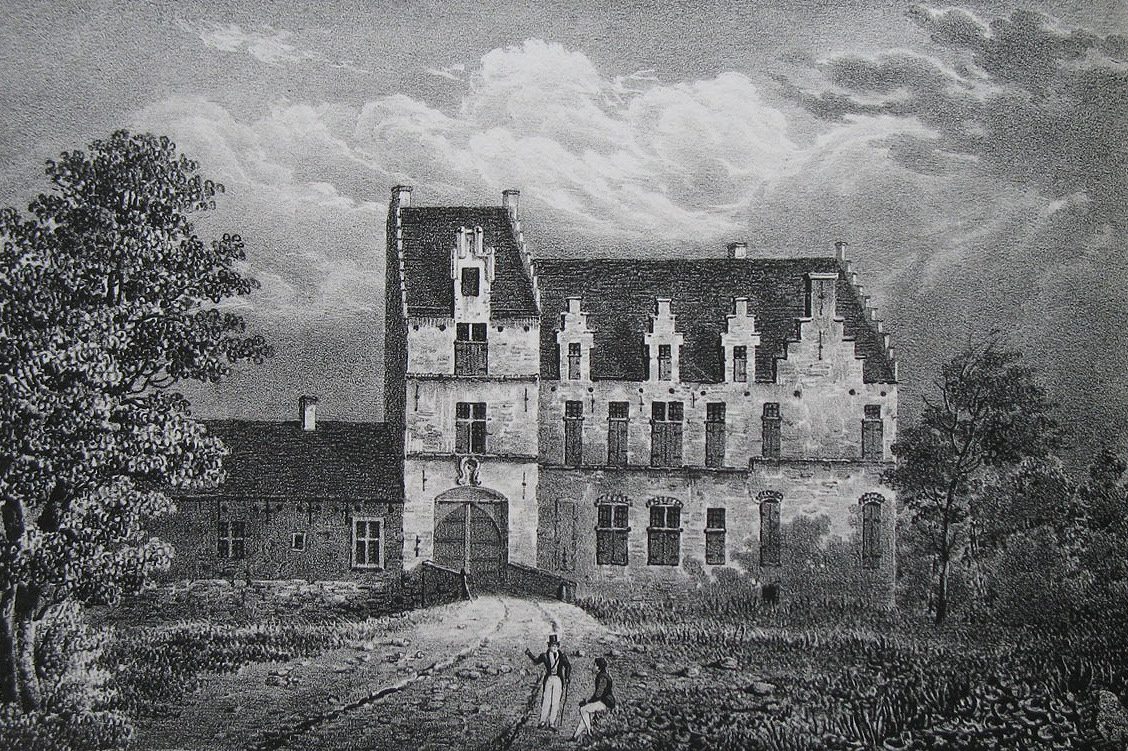
Depiction in Jean-Joseph de Cloet's Châteaux et monumens des Pays Bas, faisant suite au Voyage pittoresque (1827)
