= Saturno (disambiguation) =

A saturno is a clerical hat worn by Catholic clergy.

Saturno may also refer to:

== People ==
=== Given name ===
- Saturno Meletti (1906–1985), Italian operatic bass-baritone

=== Surname ===
- Vehnee Saturno (born 1954), Filipino composer
- William Saturno, American archaeologist

== Music ==
- Saturno (album), a 2022 album by Rauw Alejandro
- "Saturno" (song), a 2017 song by Pablo Alborán

== See also ==
- Saturn (disambiguation)
