= Elewijt vicus =

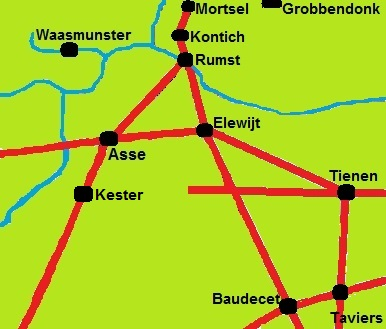
- 50°58′07″N 04°29′47″E
- Type: Roman site
- Location: Belgium
- Region: Flanders
- Part of: Elewijt, Zemst

History
- Built: first century
- Abandoned: fourth century

In the Roman period there was an important settlement (vicus) on the territory of the present-day village of Elewijt (part of Zemst, Flemish Brabant, Belgium). It was located at the junction of a secondary road (deverticulum) with the major Roman road between Tongeren and Boulogne. In the early first century, a temporary military camp was built and not much later a village started to develop. At the end of the second century, the village was ravaged by Germanic tribes, after which it was slowly rebuilt with a completely different ground plan. The vicus continued to exist as a village until the late third century, but did not recover from a second heavy attack at the end of this period. The present-day village of Elewijt developed half a mile south of the center of the vicus and cannot be seen as its successor.

== Location ==
Elewijt was located on the major Roman road connecting the eastern city of Tongeren with the western city of Boulogne. Nearby vici were those of Tienen, Asse and Rumst.
