= The Rainbow Landscape =

The Rainbow Landscape may refer to one of three works by Peter Paul Rubens:

- The Rainbow Landscape (1632–1635), Hermitage Museum, St Petersburg
- The Rainbow Landscape (1636), Wallace Collection, London
- The Rainbow Landscape (1640), Alte Pinakothek, Munich
- Landscape with Rainbow (1869), Smithsonian American Art Museum
