= Saturna =

Saturna may refer to:

- Saturna Island in the southern Gulf Islands, British Columbia, Canada
- Saturna, British Columbia, a community on Saturna Island
- Saturna (festival)
- Saturna (comics), Rebirth version of DC Comics supervillain Eviless.

== See also ==
- Saturn (disambiguation)
- Saturnalia
