= Zeuxidia masoni =

Scientific classification
- Kingdom: Animalia
- Phylum: Arthropoda
- Clade: Pancrustacea
- Class: Insecta
- Order: Lepidoptera
- Family: Nymphalidae
- Genus: Zeuxidia
- Species: Z. masoni

Binomial name
- Zeuxidia masoni Moore, [1879]

Species of butterfly

Zeuxidia masoni is a species of butterfly of the family Nymphalidae. It is found in Burma, the Mergui Archipelago (Kadun Kyung) and Thailand.

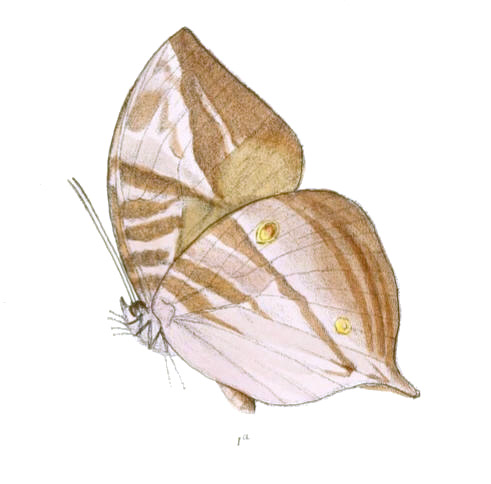
