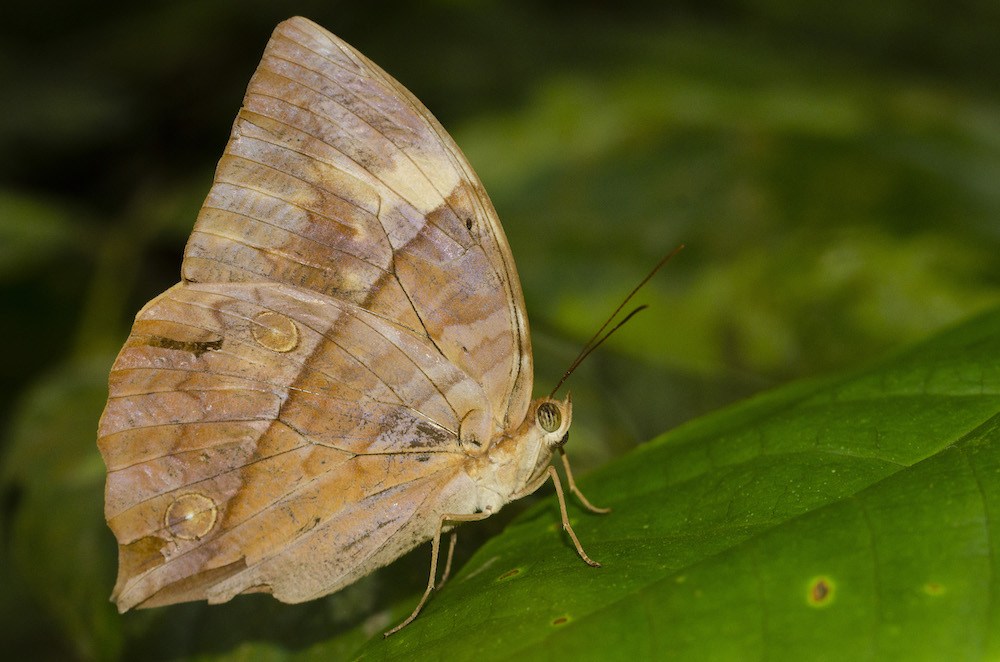
- Zeuxidia amethystus

Scientific classification
- Kingdom: Animalia
- Phylum: Arthropoda
- Clade: Pancrustacea
- Class: Insecta
- Order: Lepidoptera
- Family: Nymphalidae
- Tribe: Amathusiini
- Genus: Zeuxidia; Hübner, [1826]

Synonyms
- Aglaura Herrich-Schäffer, 1849; Aglaura Westwood, 1851; Amaxidia Staudinger, 1887; Zeuxaltis Butler, 1897

= Zeuxidia =

Genus of brush-footed butterflies

Zeuxidia is a genus of very large butterflies in the family Nymphalidae. They are "leaf" butterflies with a cryptic ventral pattern. The genus is Indomalayan (Burma through Indochina and the Philippines to Sumatra, Java and Borneo.

== Species ==
In alphabetical order:

- Zeuxidia amethystus Butler, 1865 - Saturn
- Zeuxidia aurelius (Cramer, 1777) - giant Saturn
- Zeuxidia dohrni Fruhstorfer, 1893
- Zeuxidia doubledayi Westwood, 1851
- Zeuxidia luxerii Hübner, 1826
- Zeuxidia masoni Moore, 1879
- Zeuxidia mesilauensis Barlow, Banks & Holloway, 1971
- Zeuxidia semperi Felder & Felder, 1861
- Zeuxidia sibulana Honrath, 1885
