= The Rainbow Landscape (1640) =

Painting by Peter Paul Rubens

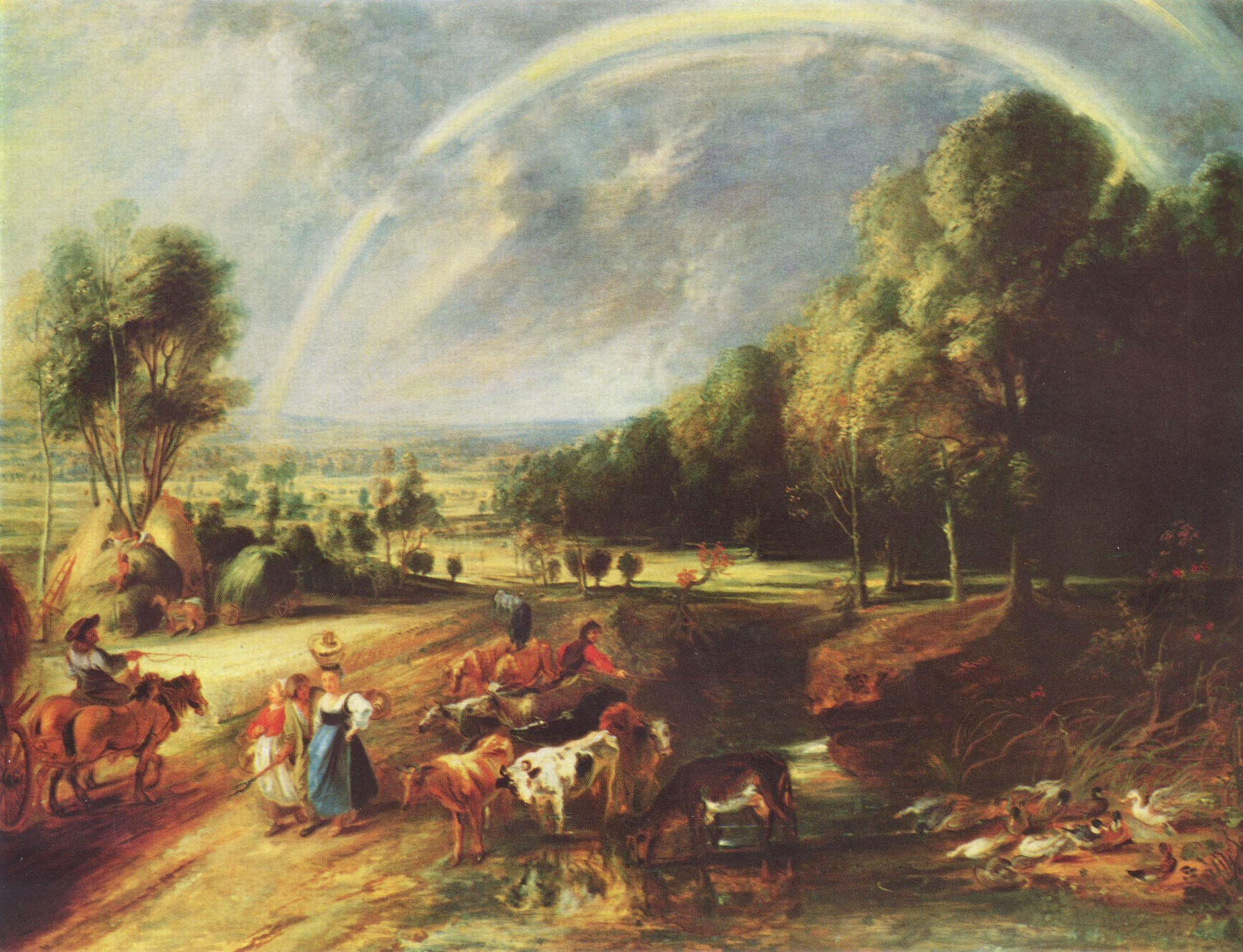
The Rainbow Landscape (1640) by Rubens

The Rainbow Landscape is a 1640 oil-on-panel painting by Peter Paul Rubens, now in the Alte Pinakothek in Munich. One of the painter's last works and the third of three autograph works on the same subject, it mixes Italian and Flemish influences in a style reminiscent of Rubens' friend Jan Bruegel the Elder but with figures drawing on nymphs from the work of Annibale Carracci and Domenichino.
