= The Rainbow Landscape (1632–1635) =

Painting by Peter Paul Rubens

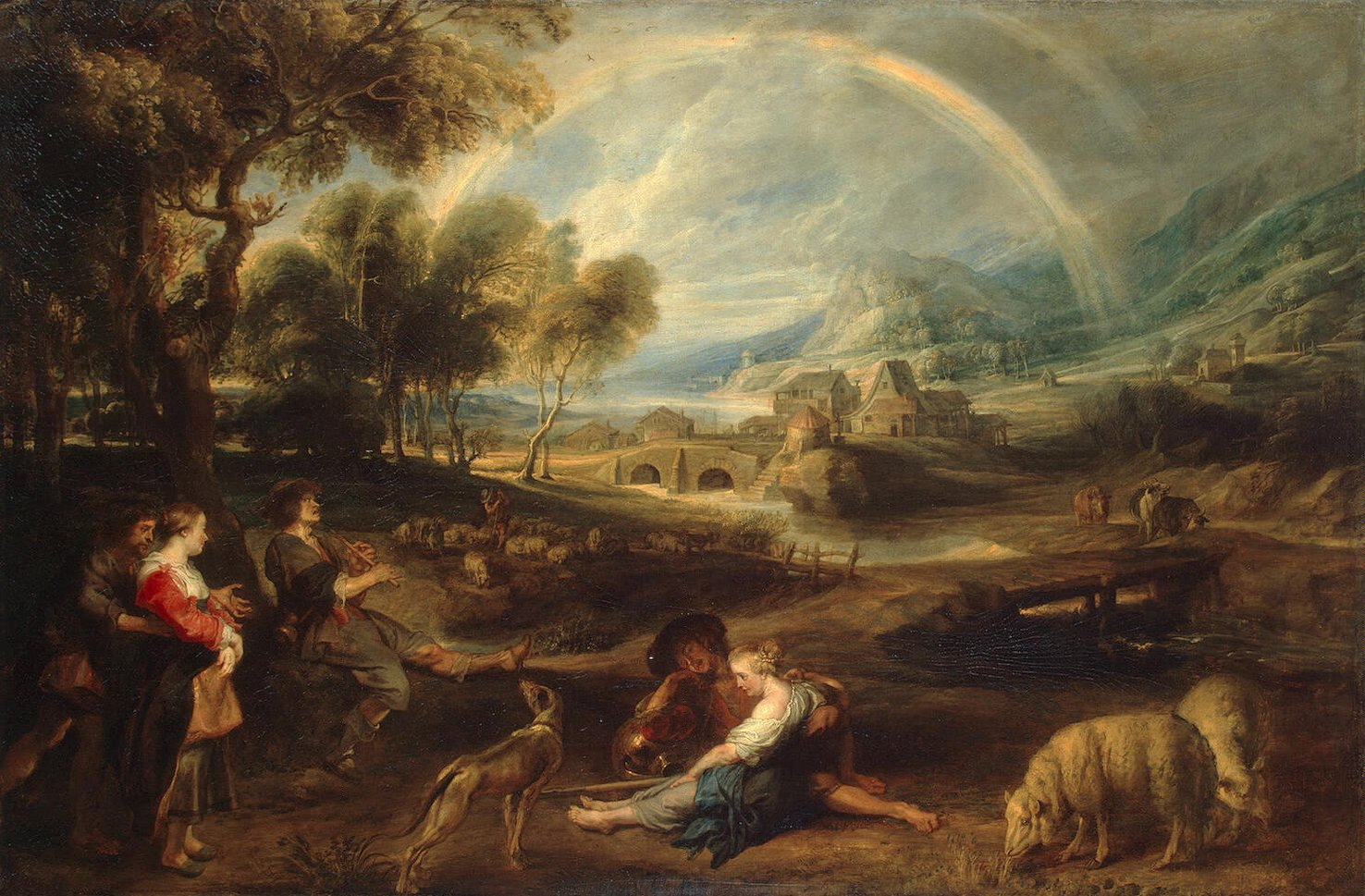
- Artist: Peter Paul Rubens
- Year: 1635
- Medium: Oil painting

The Rainbow Landscape is a 1632–1635 oil painting by Peter Paul Rubens, one of a number of autograph works on the subject. Originally owned by Prince Richelieu, it was later given to Count Brühl by the Bavarian elector, son of Charles VII, Holy Roman Emperor. In 1769 it was bought from the count's collection in Dresden for the Hermitage Museum, where it now hangs. Originally on panel, it was transferred to a canvas support by A Mitrokhin in 1869.

Thought to be autograph work until 1945, a studio copy was in the collection of Louis XIII and is now in the Louvre.
