= Mackerel sky =

Clouds with a rippling pattern

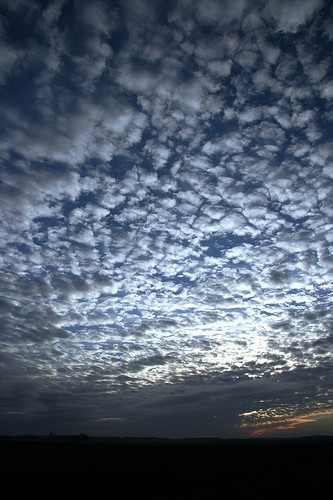
- Altocumulus mackerel sky
- Abbreviation: Ac
- Genus: Alto- (mediumhigh) -cumulus (heaped)
- Appearance: Clumps and rolls of clouds that resemble mackerel scales
- Precipitation: No, but may signify approaching precipitation.

A mackerel sky consists of multiple rows of cirrocumulus or altocumulus clouds in an undulating, rippling pattern resembling fish scales and caused by high altitude atmospheric waves.

Cirrocumulus appears almost exclusively with cirrus some distance ahead of a warm front and is a reliable forecaster that the weather is about to change. When these high clouds progressively invade the sky and the barometric pressure begins to fall, precipitation associated with the disturbance is likely about 6 to 12 hours away. As thickening and lowering of cirrocumulus into middle-étage altostratus or altocumulus is a good sign that the warm front or low front has moved closer and it may start raining within less than six hours. The old rhymes "Mackerel sky, not twenty-four hours dry" and "Mares' tails and mackerel scales make lofty ships to carry low sails" both refer to this long-recognized phenomenon.

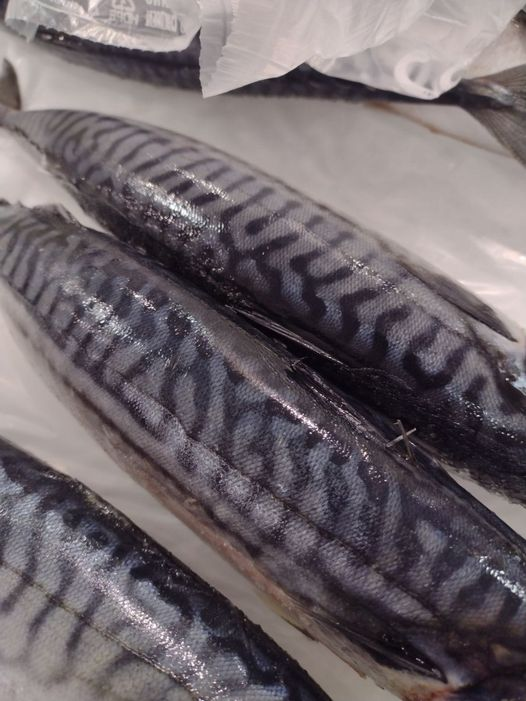
Norwegian Mackerel displaying the skin pattern of a mackerel sky

Other phrases in weather lore take mackerel skies as a sign of changeable weather. Examples include "Mackerel sky, mackerel sky. Never long wet and never long dry", and "A dappled sky, like a painted woman, soon changes its face".

It is sometimes known as a buttermilk sky, particularly when in the early cirrocumulus stage, in reference to the clouds' "curdled" appearance.

== In culture ==
Peter Paul Rubens' painting A View of Het Steen in the Early Morning (c.1636) depicts a mackerel sky.

"Ole Buttermilk Sky" by Hoagy Carmichael was nominated for an Academy Award for Best Original Song in 1946.

== Gallery ==
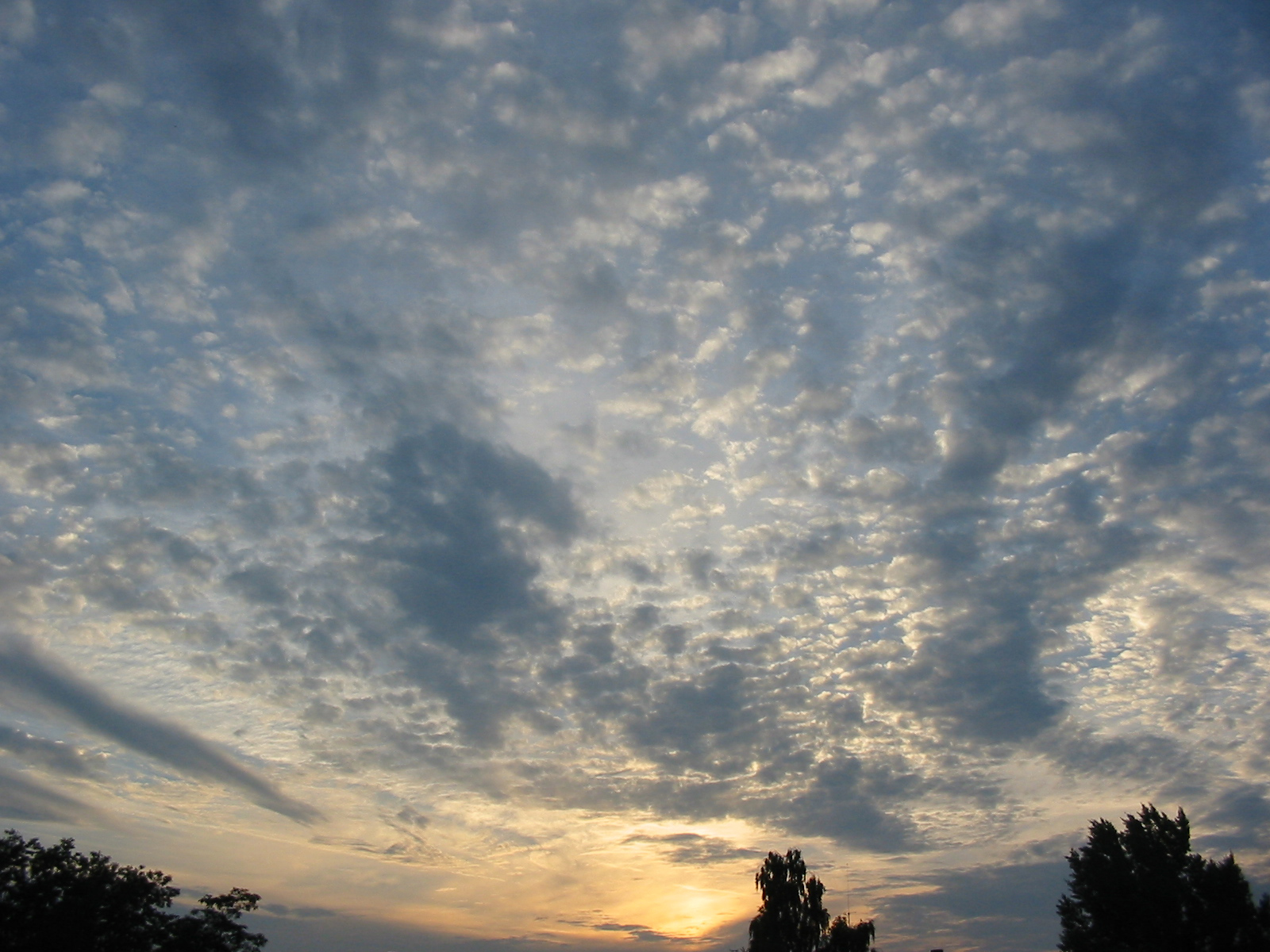
Mackerel sky over Erlangen, Germany

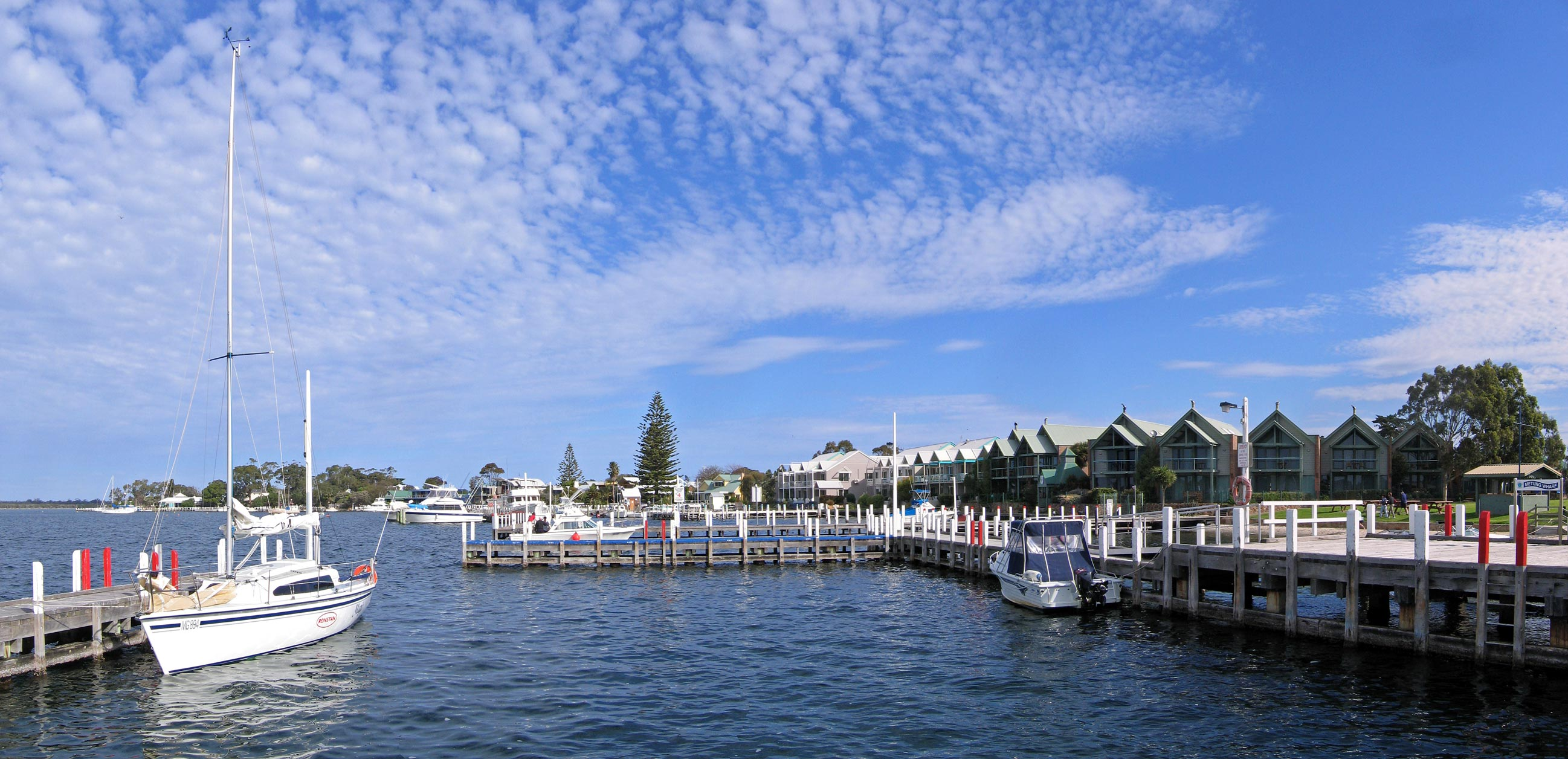
Mackerel sky over Metung, Victoria, Australia

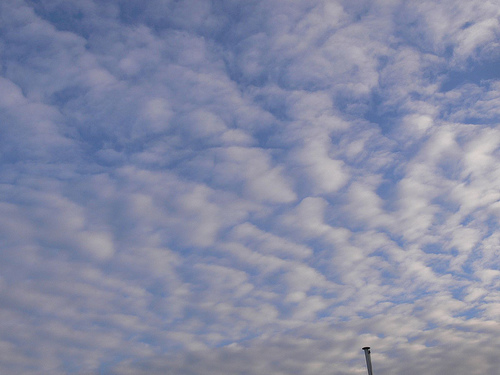
Mackerel sky over Heidelberg, Germany

Rubens' A View of Het Steen in the Early Morning

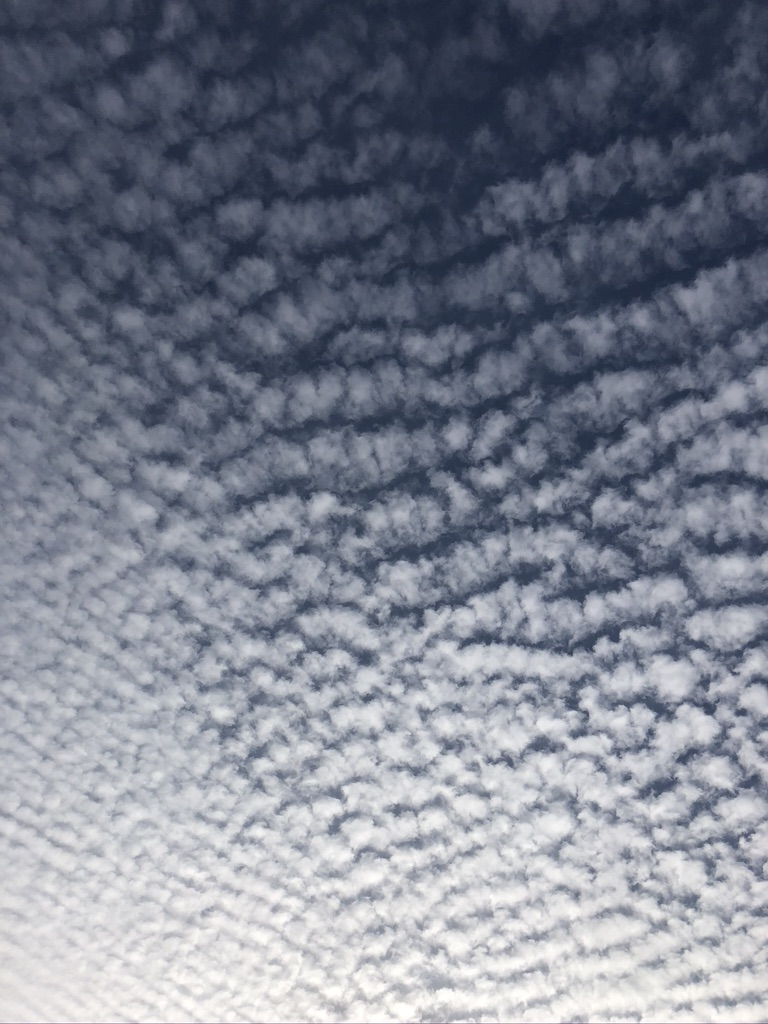
Altocumulus mackerel sky clouds over Burlington, Canada.
