= Zeuxidia doubledayi =

Scientific classification
- Kingdom: Animalia
- Phylum: Arthropoda
- Clade: Pancrustacea
- Class: Insecta
- Order: Lepidoptera
- Family: Nymphalidae
- Genus: Zeuxidia
- Species: Z. doubledayi

Binomial name
- Zeuxidia doubledayi Westwood, 1851

Species of butterfly

Zeuxidia doubledayi , the Scarce Saturn, is a large butterfly that belongs to the Morphinae group of the family Nymphalidae. It was described by John Obadiah Westwood in 1851. It is found in the Indomalayan realm.

== Subspecies ==
- Z. d. doubledayi (Peninsular Malaysia, Singapore)
- Z. d. horsfieldi C. & R. Felder, [1867] (Borneo)
- Z. d. sumatrana Fruhstorfer, 1906 (Sumatra: low elevations)
- Z. d. nicevillei Fruhstorfer, 1895 (Sumatra: Battak Mountains)
- Z. d. anaxilla Fruhstorfer, 1911 (Bangka)
