= Zeuxidia aurelius =

- female

Scientific classification
- Kingdom: Animalia
- Phylum: Arthropoda
- Clade: Pancrustacea
- Class: Insecta
- Order: Lepidoptera
- Family: Nymphalidae
- Genus: Zeuxidia
- Species: Z. aurelius

Binomial name
- Zeuxidia aurelius (Cramer, [1777])

Synonyms
- Papilio aurelius Cramer, [1777]

Species of butterfly

Zeuxidia aurelius, the giant Saturn, is a species of butterfly of the family Nymphalidae. It is found in Sumatra, Peninsular Malaysia and Borneo.

The wingspan is about 145 mm.

== Subspecies ==
- Zeuxidia aurelius aurelius (Sumatra, Peninsular Malaya)
- Zeuxidia aurelius aureliana (south-eastern Borneo)
- Zeuxidia aurelius euthycrite (northern Borneo)
