= Elewijt =

Coordinates: 50.9618°N 4.4557°E

Elewijt is a village in the municipality of Zemst, Flemish Brabant, Belgium.

== History ==
=== Roman period ===
The village was first founded in the 1st century as a Roman vicus on a junction of roads. It kept existing until it was destroyed at the end of the third century. Hundreds of years later, a new village slowly began to arise, with the center half a mile to the south of the ruins of the old village.

=== post-Roman period ===
Throughout most of the late Middle Ages, Elewijt and the nearby village of Perk formed a Herrschaft (territory) herrschaft. In the 11th century, a wooden fort was built in the southwestern part of the village. Later the Elewijt Castle (Het Steen) was modernised and in the 1630s it was a residence of the famous painter Pieter Paul Rubens.

== Monuments ==
Elewijt contains the castle of Het Steen, which was owned by Peter Paul Rubens from 1635 to his death in 1640, and featured in some of his paintings.
