= Lazarus Marcquis =

- Born: 1574
- Died: 1647 (aged 72–73)

Lazarus Marcquis (1574–1647) was a physician in the Habsburg Netherlands.

== Life ==
Marcquis was born in Antwerp in 1574 (sometimes mistakenly given as 1571) and was baptised in Antwerp Cathedral on 7 January. His father was the diamond merchant Barthélemi Marcquis, originally from Wallonia, and his mother Catherine Noppen, a native of 's-Hertogenbosch. After studying at the Jesuit College in Antwerp, where Peter Paul Rubens was among his fellow students, he studied at the University of Padua, graduating doctor of medicine in 1599. On 28 June he was appointed physician to the city of Antwerp, and on 13 November he married Marie Vanden Broeck (died 1643) in Antwerp Cathedral. The couple would have thirteen children.

From 1605 until his death, Marcquis lived in a house on the Nieuwstraat in Antwerp. In 1606 he was appointed physician and surgeon to the St Elizabeth's Hospital. He became part of the late humanist circle around mayor Nicolaas Rockox, which included Gaspar Gevartius, Philip Rubens, Deodat del Monte, Joannes Woverius, Laurentius Beyerlinck, Aubert Miraeus, Jan and Balthasar Moretus, and Franciscus Sweertius. On 24 November 1610, the physicians of Antwerp adopted Marcquis's proposal to found a College of Medicine which would also function as a professional body and advise the city government on epidemic response and public sanitation. This Collegium Medicum was eventually founded on 28 April 1620, with Marcquis appointed its first professor of surgery and anatomy.

In 1646 he unsuccessfully applied to the city council to cover the expense of a coach and coachman, since he was no longer able to ride or walk to patients as previously. He retired in March 1647 and died on 26 December of the same year. A memorial was erected in the church of the Dominican convent in Antwerp. A portrait of him by Anthony van Dyck was engraved by Sebastian Barras.

== Writings ==
- Cort advys van de Doctoren van Antwerpen teghen de Peste (1620; reprinted 1624)
- Volcomen Tractaet van de Peste (1634; expanded edition 1636)
