= Saturn (software) =

Computer program that calculates transport assignment on road networks

- Developer(s): University of Leeds and Atkins
- Stable release: 11.6.03E
- Operating system: Windows
- Type: Traffic Software
- License: Software license agreement

SATURN (Simulation and Assignment of Traffic to Urban Road Networks) is a computer program that calculates transport assignment on road networks. It is developed by the University of Leeds and Atkins.

Saturn competes with VISUM by PTV.
