= Helena Fourment with Children =

Painting by Peter Paul Rubens

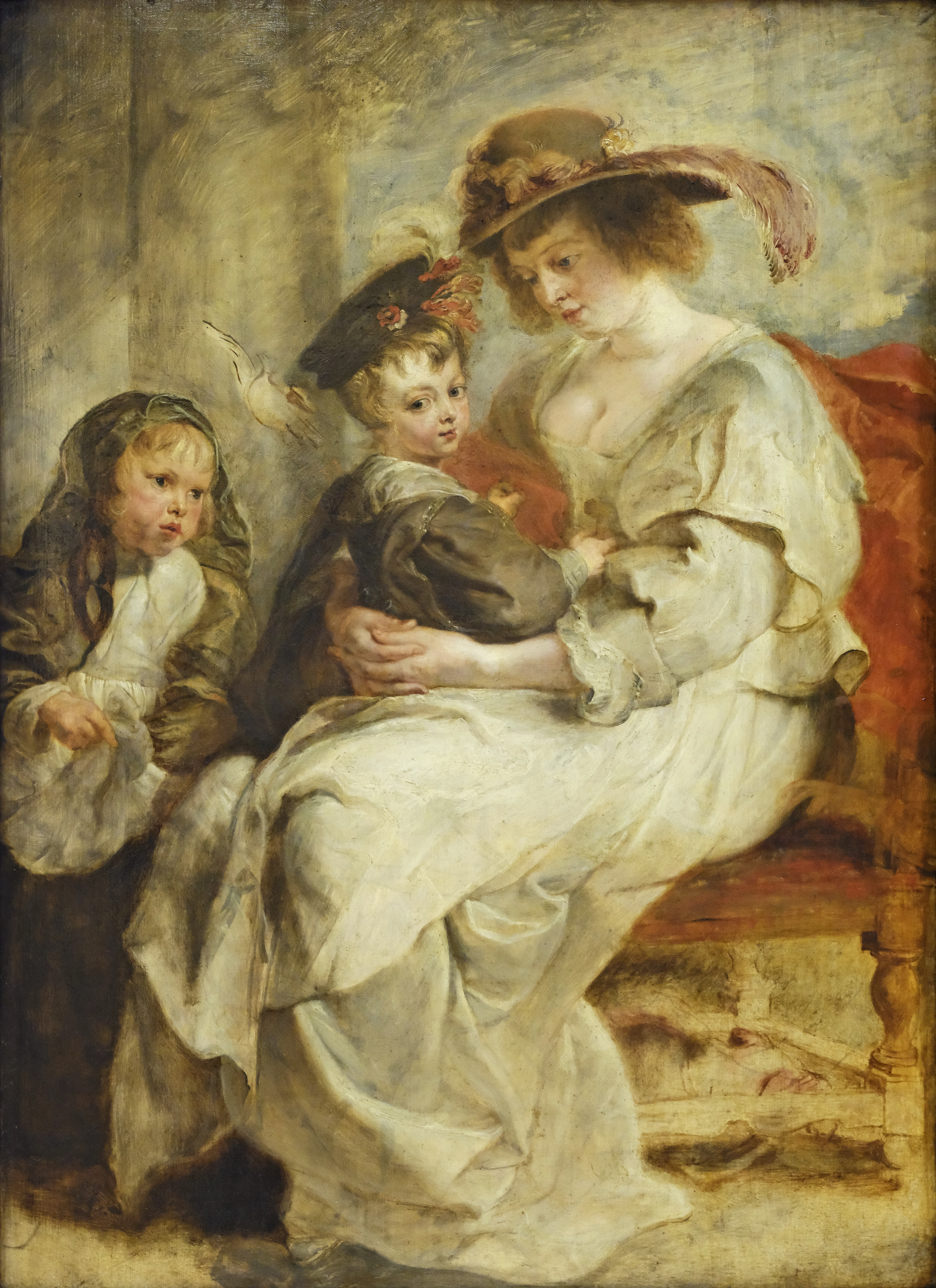
Helena Fourment with Children (1636) by Rubens

Helena Fourment with Children is a c.1636 painting by Peter Paul Rubens, showing his second wife Helena Fourment with their son Frans (born 12 July 1633) in her arms and their daughter Clara Johanna (born 18 January 1632) standing to their left. It was acquired by Louis XVI of France in 1784 and is now in the Louvre Museum in Paris.

== Description ==
The painting is an oil on canvas measuring 1.15 m. on 0.85 m.

This represents Hélène Fourment (1614–1673), the second wife of the painter Pierre Paul Rubens. Daughter of a wealthy merchant in tapestries, she married the painter in 1630 at the age of 16 while the latter, widower of his first wife, was 53 at the time of the wedding. She is surrounded by two of their children: Clara-Johanna (born in 1632) and Frans (born in 1633).

In the center of the composition, Hélène Fourment wears a simple white dress and hugs her son Frans. The latter looks in the direction of the viewer. Clara-Johanna is standing on the left and turns her gaze towards her mother and her brother.

A pentimento reveals, between the heads of Frans and Clara-Johanna, the arms of a third child, Isabelle, born in 1635. Certain colors have also never been completely affixed, such as the blue in the upper right corner which presents white streaks. Rubens thus leaves a partially unfinished work.
