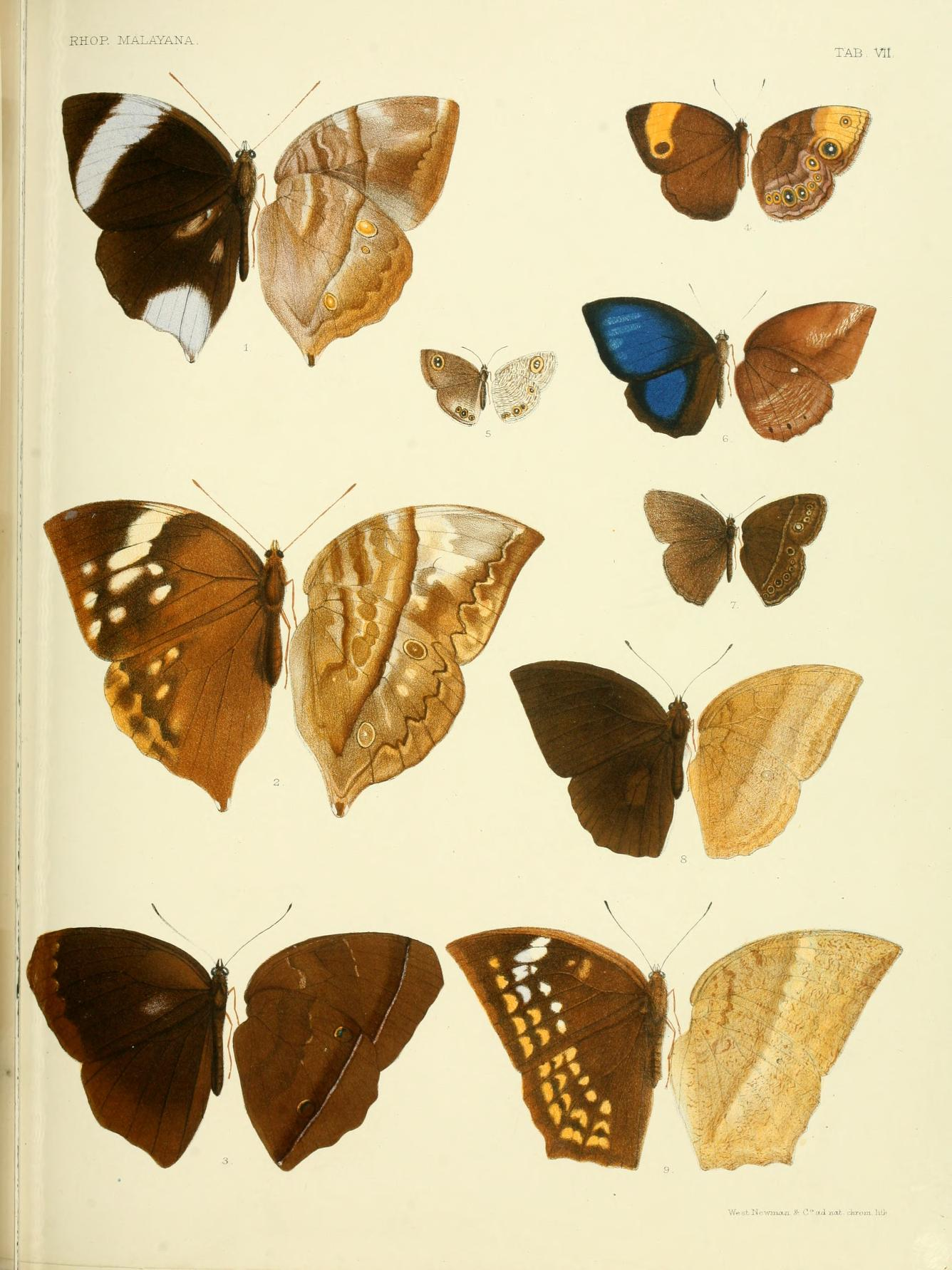
- In William Lucas Distant's Rhopalocera Malayana
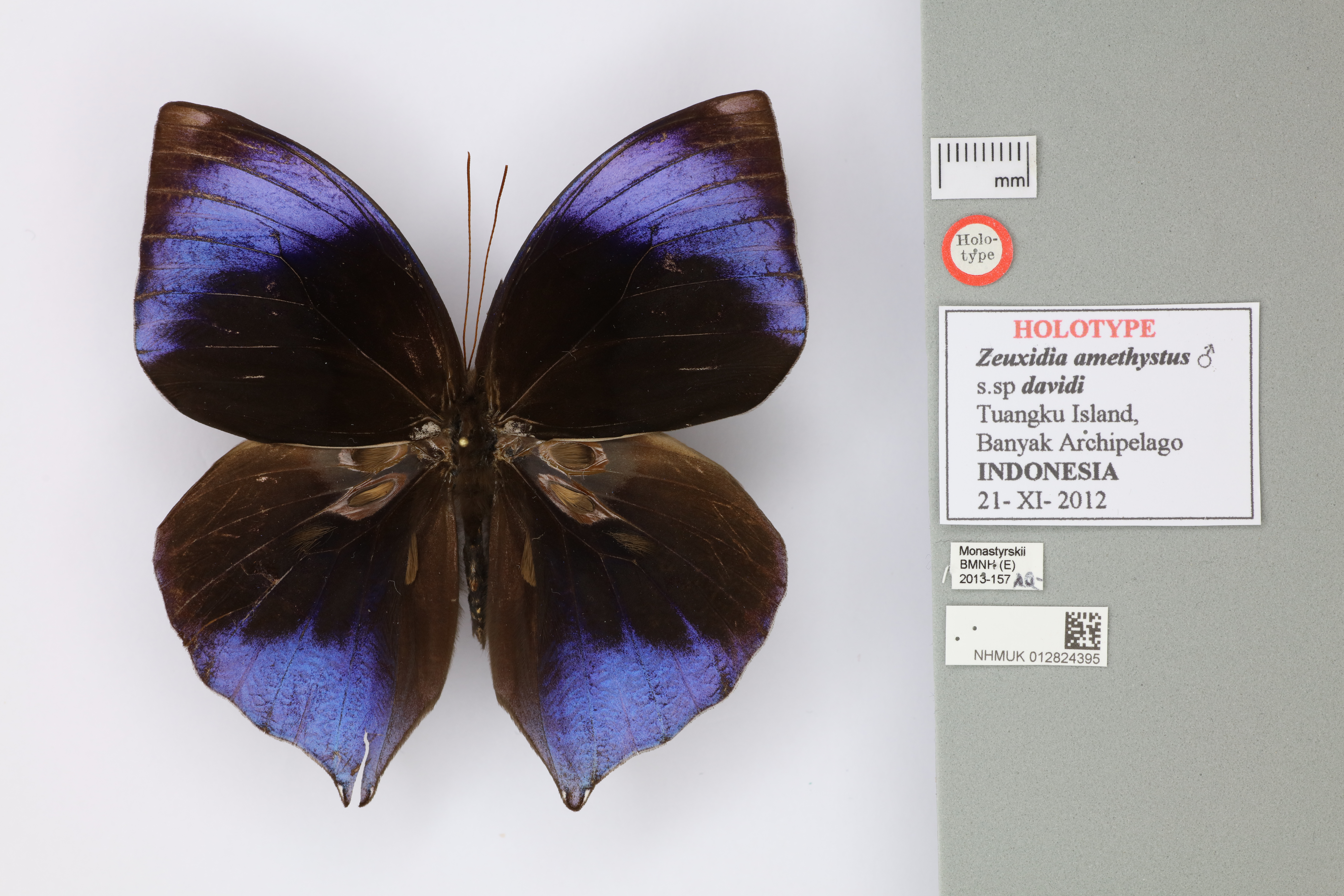

Scientific classification
- Kingdom: Animalia
- Phylum: Arthropoda
- Clade: Pancrustacea
- Class: Insecta
- Order: Lepidoptera
- Family: Nymphalidae
- Genus: Zeuxidia
- Species: Z. amethystus

Binomial name
- Zeuxidia amethystus Butler, 1865

= Zeuxidia amethystus =

Species of butterfly

Zeuxidia amethystus, the common Saturn, is a species of butterfly in the family Nymphalidae. It was described by Arthur Gardiner Butler in 1865. This butterfly is relatively large and striking. Its forewings have a broad iridescent-blue band with a similar blue patch on the hindwing. It is not abundant in Thailand, Malaysia, Sumatra and Borneo. It has only been observed in dense forests. It can be approached while feeding on fermenting fallen fruits. Its flight period extends from May to September. It obtains minerals using mud-puddling behavior and seem to be prefer ammonium ions rather than sodium.

It is sometimes collected and displayed as fine wall art.

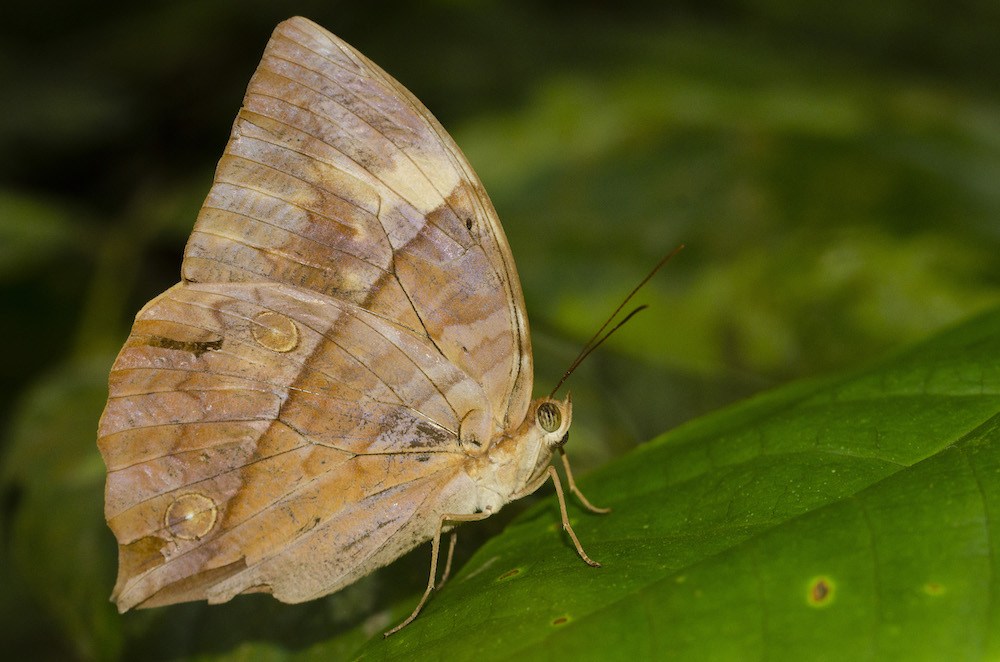
Saturn butterfly from Petaling Jaya, Selangor, Malaysia

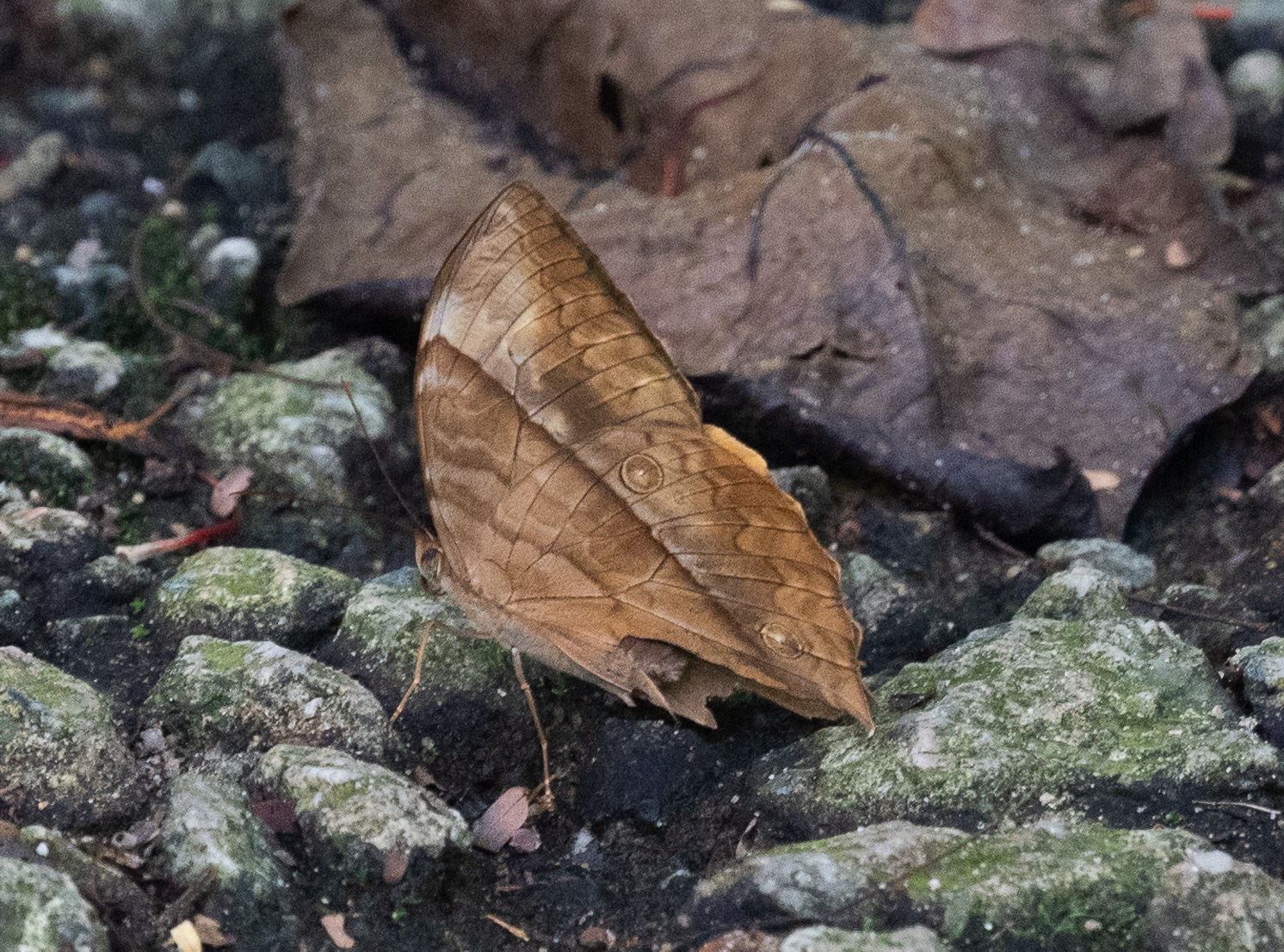
Saturn (Zeuxidia amethystus) from Bukit Timah nature reserve, Singapore
