= Saturn (Rubens) =

Painting by Peter Paul Rubens

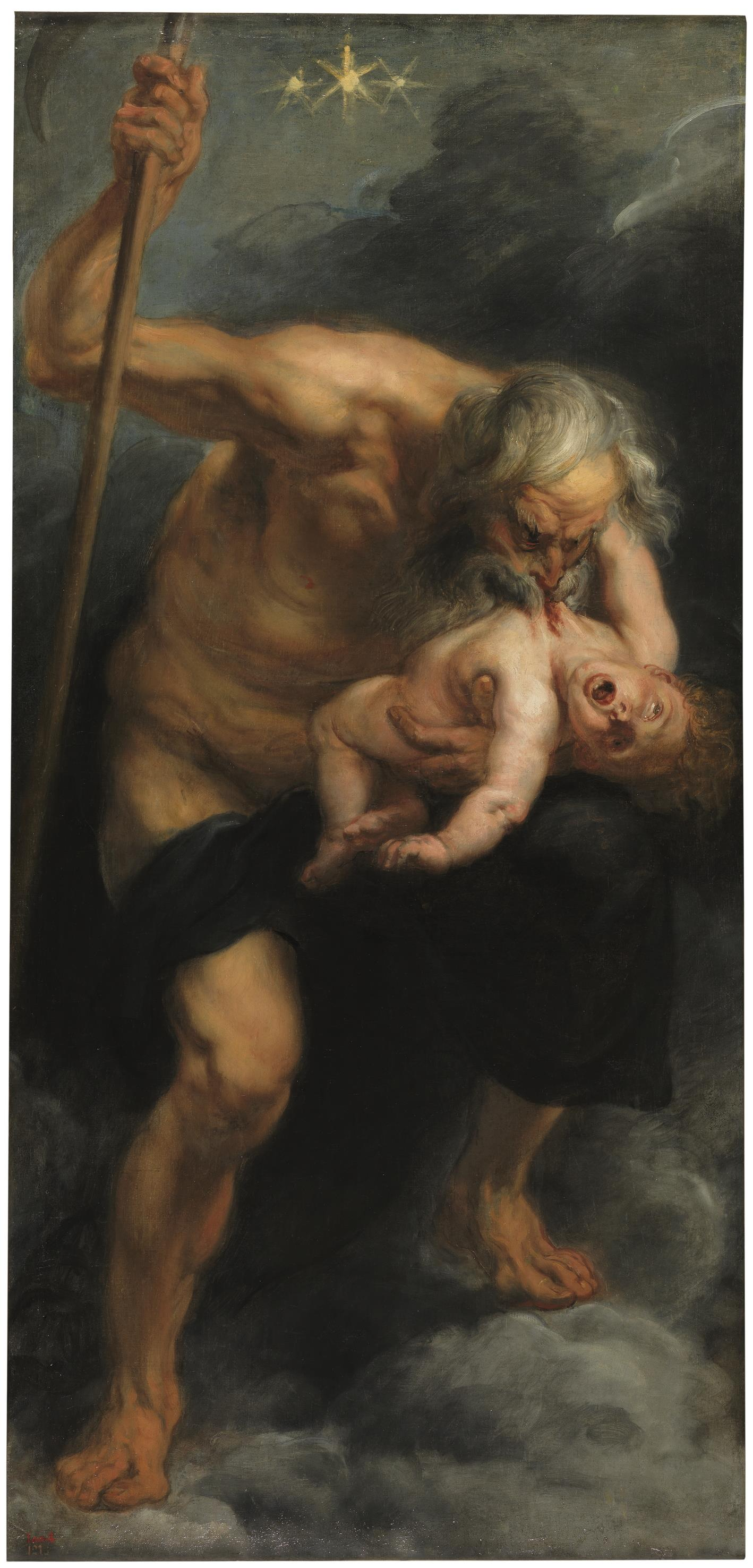
- Artist: Peter Paul Rubens
- Year: c. 1636–1638
- Dimensions: 182.5 cm × 87 cm (71.9 in × 34 in)
- Location: Museo del Prado; Madrid

Saturn or Saturn Devouring His Son is a 1636 painting by the Flemish artist Peter Paul Rubens, now in the Museo del Prado, in Madrid.

It was commissioned for the Torre de la Parada by Philip IV of Spain and shows the influence of Michelangelo on Rubens, which he had picked up on his journey to Italy. The three stars at the top of the painting represent the planet Saturn as described by Galileo a few years before its painting. The central star is the planet itself, while the two others represent what he thought were two stars aligned with the planet. In reality, these were the rings around the planet, which his telescope was not powerful enough to distinguish.

The painting represents the Greek myth of the titan Cronus devouring his children. In the original myth, Cronus swallowed his children whole, and later spit them out, also whole. The painting, however, shows Cronus taking a bite out of one of his children. (Note: "These great Cronos swallowed as each came forth from the womb to his mother's knees with this intent, that no other of the proud sons of Heaven should hold the kingly office amongst the deathless gods. For he learned from Earth and starry Heaven that he was destined to be overcome by his own son, strong though he was, through the contriving of great Zeus.") (Note: "After that, the strength and glorious limbs of the prince increased quickly, and as the years rolled on, great Cronos the wily was beguiled by the deep suggestions of Earth, and brought up again his offspring, vanquished by the arts and might of his own son, and he vomited up first the stone which he had swallowed last.")

== See also ==
- Child cannibalism
- Infanticide
