= A View of Het Steen in the Early Morning =

Painting by Peter Paul Rubens (c. 1636)

- An Autumn Landscape with a View of Het Steen in the Early Morning
- Artist: Peter Paul Rubens
- Year: c. 1636
- Medium: oil paint
- Movement: Baroque
- Dimensions: 131.2 cm (51.7 in) × 229.2 cm (90.2 in)
- Location: Flanders, Belgium
- Collection: National Gallery
- Identifiers: RKDimages ID: 10106; Art UK artwork ID: an-autumn-landscape-with-a-view-of-het-steen-in-the-early-morning-114292

A View of Het Steen in the Early Morning, also called Château de Steen with Hunter or simply Het Steen, is a landscape painting by Flemish artist Peter Paul Rubens, dating to around 1636. It measures 131.2 cm by 229.2 cm and is now in the National Gallery in London.

A rare example of a work painted for the artist's own pleasure rather than for a commission, it shows a view of the Het Steen estate near Brussels, which Rubens had acquired in 1635, set in an early-morning autumn landscape. He had initially intended to create a much smaller painting focusing on the house, using three small oak planks, probably spares from his studio, but as the concept developed, seventeen more panels were added.

The painting has influenced artists including John Constable during his period working for Sir George Beaumont, who then owned the painting and later donated it to the National Gallery in 1823. The painting is notable for featuring the first convincing artistic depiction of a mackerel sky.

== See also ==
- 100 Great Paintings, 1980 BBC series
