= The Rainbow Landscape (1636) =

Painting by Peter Paul Rubens

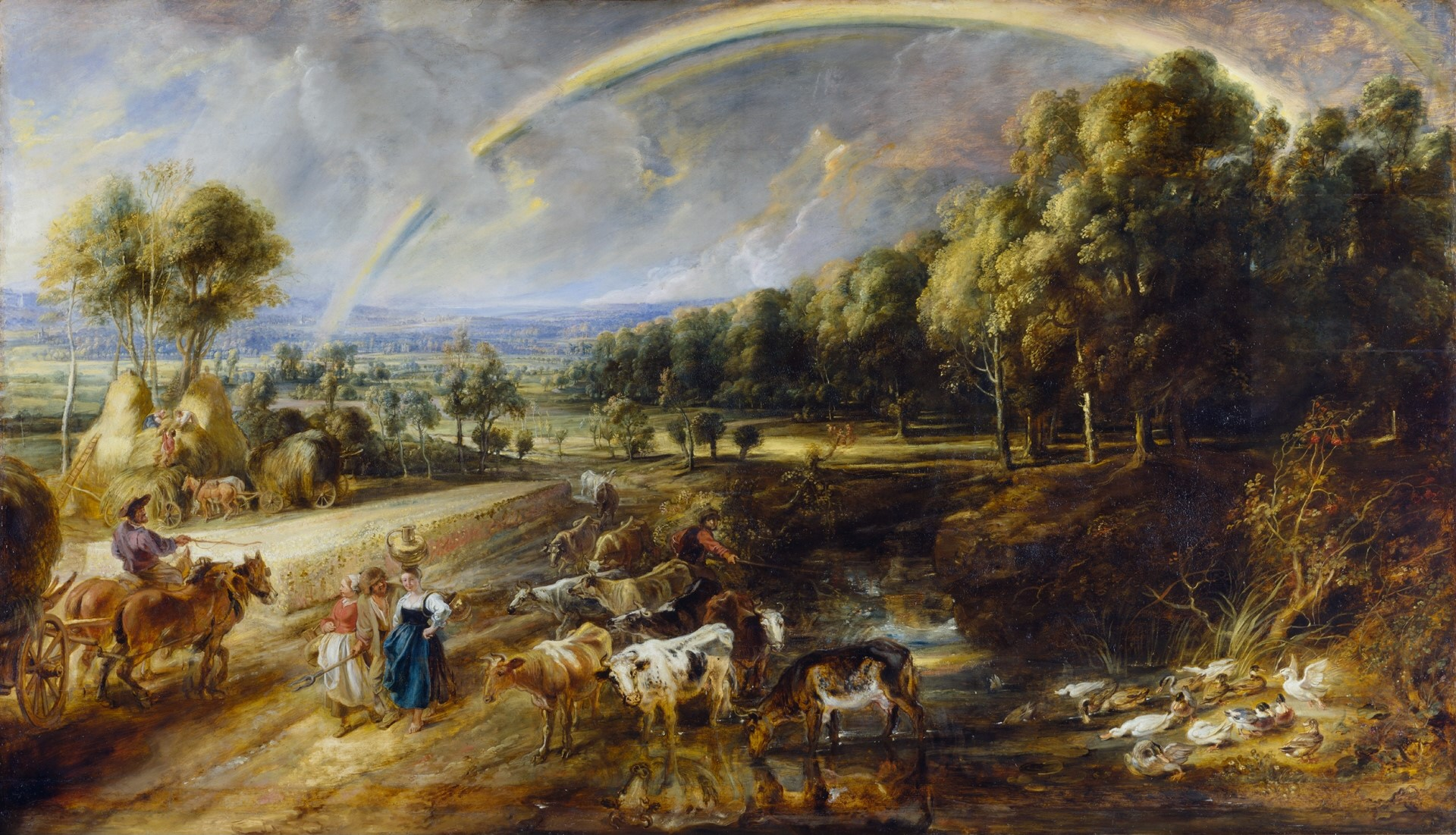
The Rainbow Landscape (c. 1636) by Rubens

The Rainbow Landscape or Landscape with Rainbow is a c. 1636 landscape painting by Peter Paul Rubens, now in the Wallace Collection in London. It forms a pendant to A View of Het Steen in the Early Morning which is held in the National Gallery in London
