= Den Tseut =

Brewery in Oosteeklo, Belgium

Huisbrouwerij Den Tseut
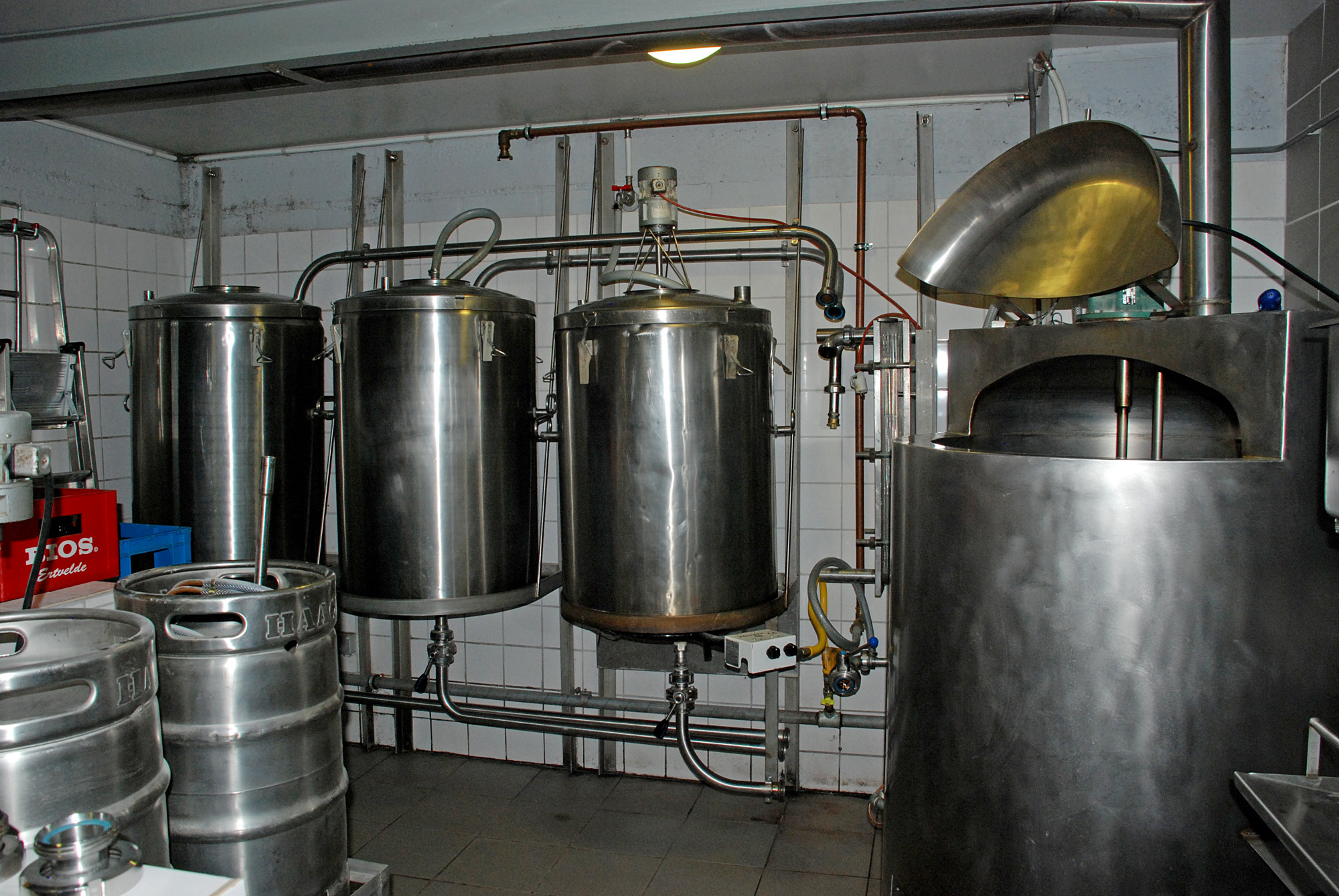
- Type: Craft brewery
- Location: Oosteeklo
- Opened: 2007
- Key people: Stefan De Decker, Ria Danneels
- Annual production volume: 800 hectolitres
- Website: www.huisbrouwerijdentseut.be

Den Tseut is a craft brewery located in the Belgian village of Oosteeklo (part of the municipality of Assenede, East Flanders). The brewery was founded in 2007 by Stefan De Decker and Ria Danneels.

In 2015 the brewery's capacity was increased from 300 hectolitres to 800 hectolitres.

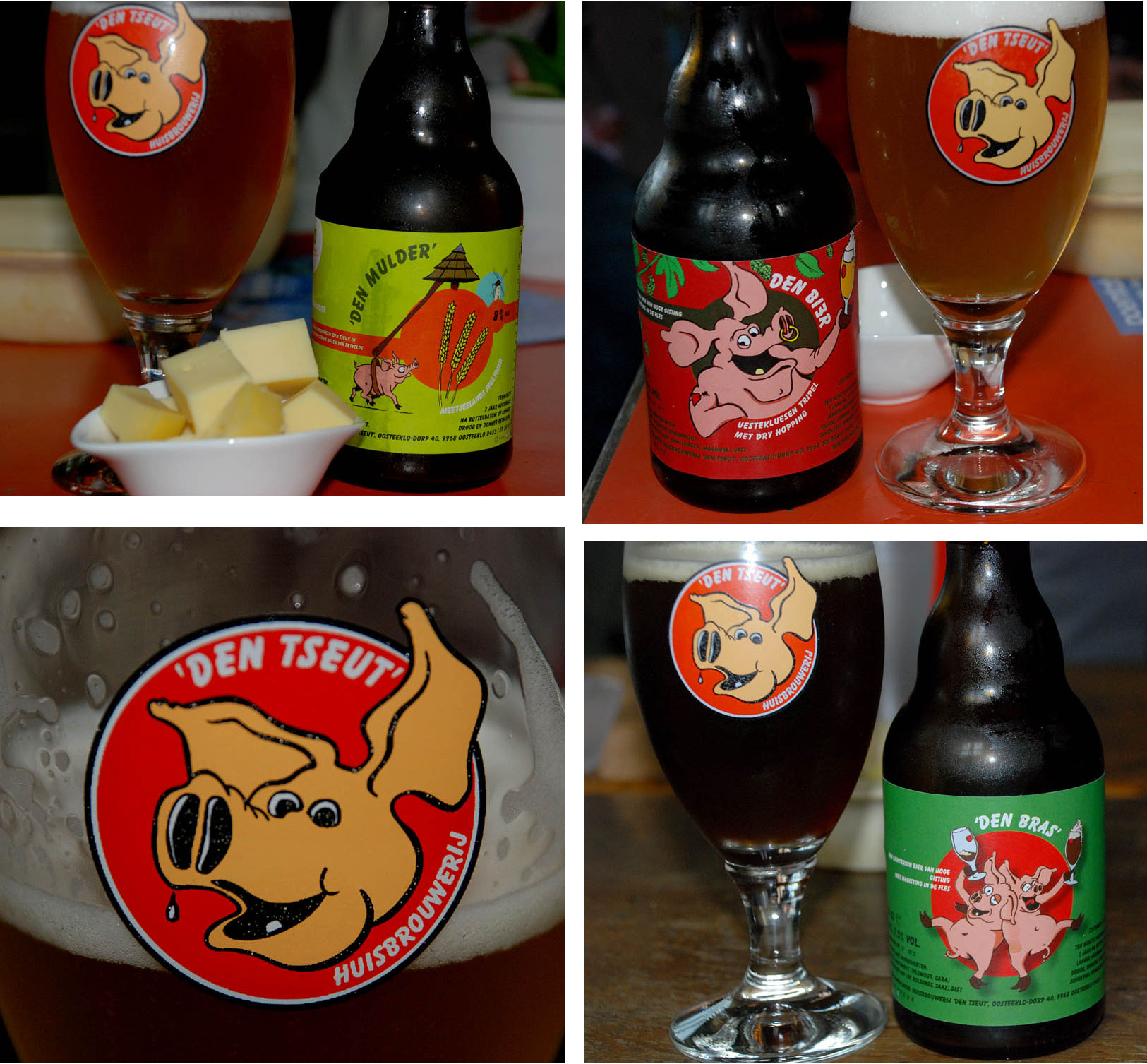
Some Den Tseut beers

Beers brewed include Den Tseut, Bras, Den Beir, Belle Cies, Den Mulder, Den Krulsteirt, Hoppesnoet and Den Drupneuze.

In 2016 the brewery began production of an abbey beer, "Den Cister", named after the Cistercian Oosteeklo Abbey that once stood in the village.
