= Joanna de Hertoghe =

Joanna de Hertoghe (c. 1566–1630) was an abbess of the Cistercian Oosteeklo Abbey in Ghent.

== Life ==
Joanna was the daughter of Cornelis de Herthoghe, esquire, alderman and treasurer of the city of Ghent, and Anna van Exaarde. At the age of 31, on 21 January 1597, she was clothed as a Cistercian nun of Oosteeklo Abbey, making profession of her vows on 28 January 1598. The abbess, Elisabeth Fransmans, appointed her sacristan and bursar. In 1610 she was elected to succeed Abbess Fransmans, serving until her death on 12 May 1630. The community had left its original home in Oosteeklo due to the burning of the monastery in 1577 (a result of the Dutch Revolt) and was living in a former residence of the Count of Flanders in Ghent. Abbess de Hertoghe began the work of converting the buildings into a suitable home for a monastic community, building the dormitory, cloister, and work room. In this she was helped by donations from her father and from her sister, Margareta, who was prioress of the hospital in Kortrijk. Among her beautifications she commissioned a reliquary and a series of paintings of the mysteries of the rosary.
