= Gerard de Baere =

17th-century Flemish abbot

- Abbot of Ten Duinen Abbey
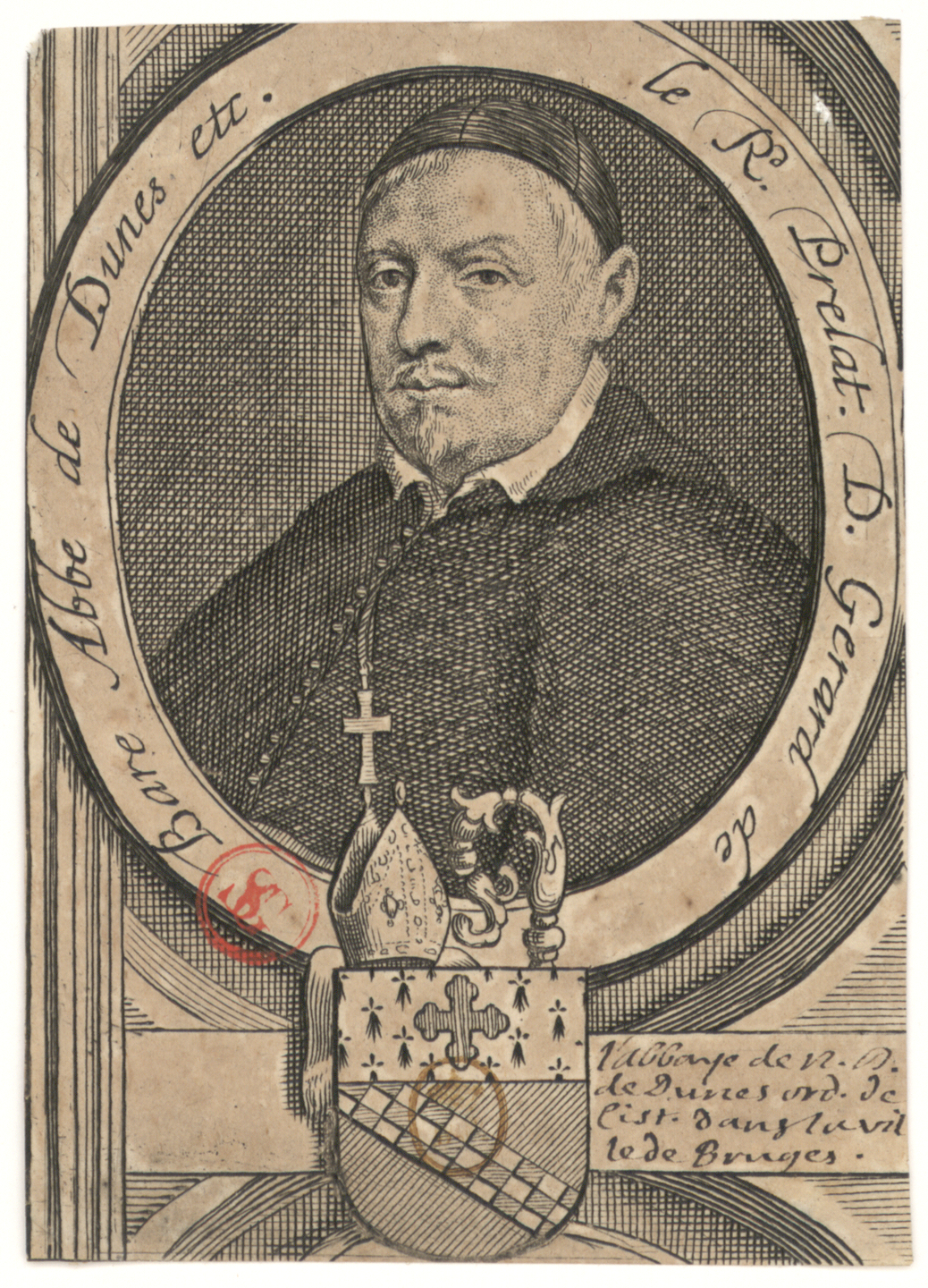
- Engraved portrait of Gerard de Baere
- Elected: 1653
- Term ended: 1666

Orders
- Ordination: 24 September 1633

Personal details
- Born: 1608 Laarne, County of Flanders, Spanish Netherlands
- Died: 1666 (aged 57–58) Bruges, County of Flanders, Spanish Netherlands

Gerard de Baere, a native of Laarne, was the 43rd abbot of Ten Duinen Abbey in Bruges from 1653 to 1666.

== Life ==
De Baere was professed as a monk in 1631. He was ordained subdeacon on 10 April 1632, deacon on 21 May 1633, and priest on 24 September 1633. A plan to have him nominated Bishop of Bruges failed to pan out.

On 11 May 1666 he granted permission for a chapel with portable altar to be built on the former site of Oosteeklo Abbey.

He died in Bruges on 26 October 1666.

Catholic Church titles
Preceded by Bernard Bottyn	Abbot of Dunes; 1654 – 1667	Succeeded by Michel Bultynck
