= Oosteeklo =

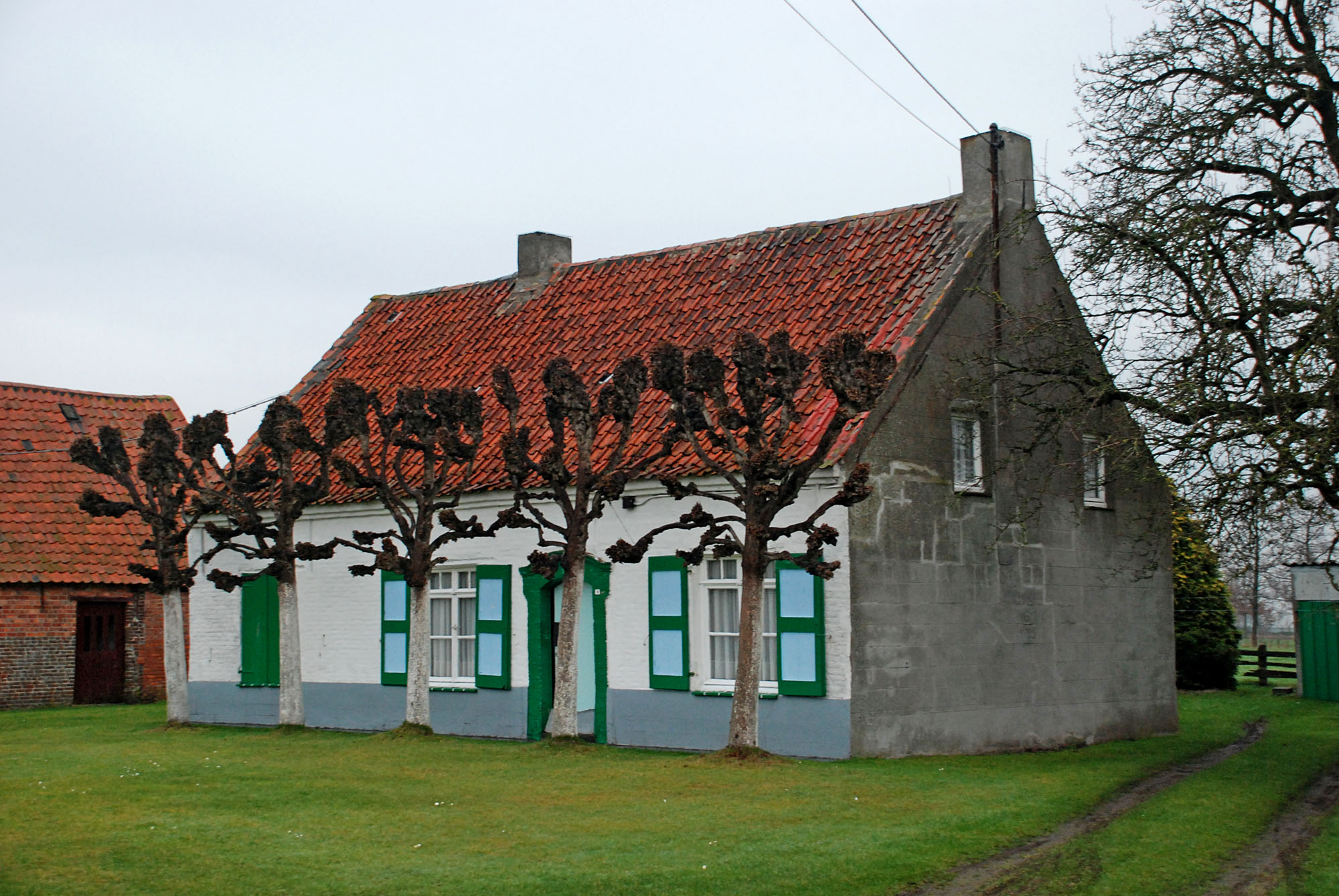
- A heritage farmhouse in Oosteeklo

- Coat of arms

- Location in Belgium
- Country: Belgium
- Region: Flemish Region
- Community: Flemish Community
- Province: East Flanders
- Arrondissement: Eeklo
- Municipality: Assenede

Area
  - Total: 16.90 km^{2} (6.53 sq mi)

Population (2021)
  - Total: 2,745
  - Density: 162.4/km^{2} (420.7/sq mi)
- Postal codes: 9968
- Website: www.oosteeklo.com

Oosteeklo (formerly Oost-Eekloo) is a historic village in the Flemish province of East Flanders, Belgium, which since 1977 has been a subdivision of the municipality of Assenede. The village is situated 9 km east of Eeklo and 17 km north of Ghent, about 9 km from the border with the Netherlands, and lies approximately 9 metres above sea-level.

A craft brewery, Den Tseut, is established in the village.

== Heritage ==
From 1217 until 1577 Oosteeklo Abbey, a Cistercian nunnery, was located in the village, but the community relocated to Ghent for safety during the hostilities of the Dutch Revolt. The monastery did maintain some property rights in the village, and a guesthouse once owned by the nuns is now listed built heritage. So are a manor house, the parish church, a number of farmhouses, a war memorial and multiple First World War German bunkers. An 18th-century windmill was demolished in 1949. Historically, the kermesse of Oosteeklo fell on the Sunday after the Feast of the Assumption.

== History ==
The oldest mention of the village is in a charter of 1226. In 1264 Ename Abbey owned a stretch of marshland in the area. The soil was sandy and the landscape low-lying heathland, granted to Oosteeklo Abbey and sublet to tenant farmers. Pasturage was supplemented with woodland and a limited acreage of arable land on which mostly rye and buckwheat were grown. Flax was grown for the production of linen. In the 18th century, the village was part of the lordship of the manor of Boekhoute. From 1801 to 1977, Oosteeklo was an independent municipality. In 1801 the population was 1,528.

During the Eighty Years' War, Oosteeklo saw action in 1577 and 1645. During the wars of Louis XIV troops were frequently billeted in the village. On 18 October 1790 a corps of volunteers from Oosteeklo was sworn into the army of the United Belgian States in Ghent.

== Gallery ==
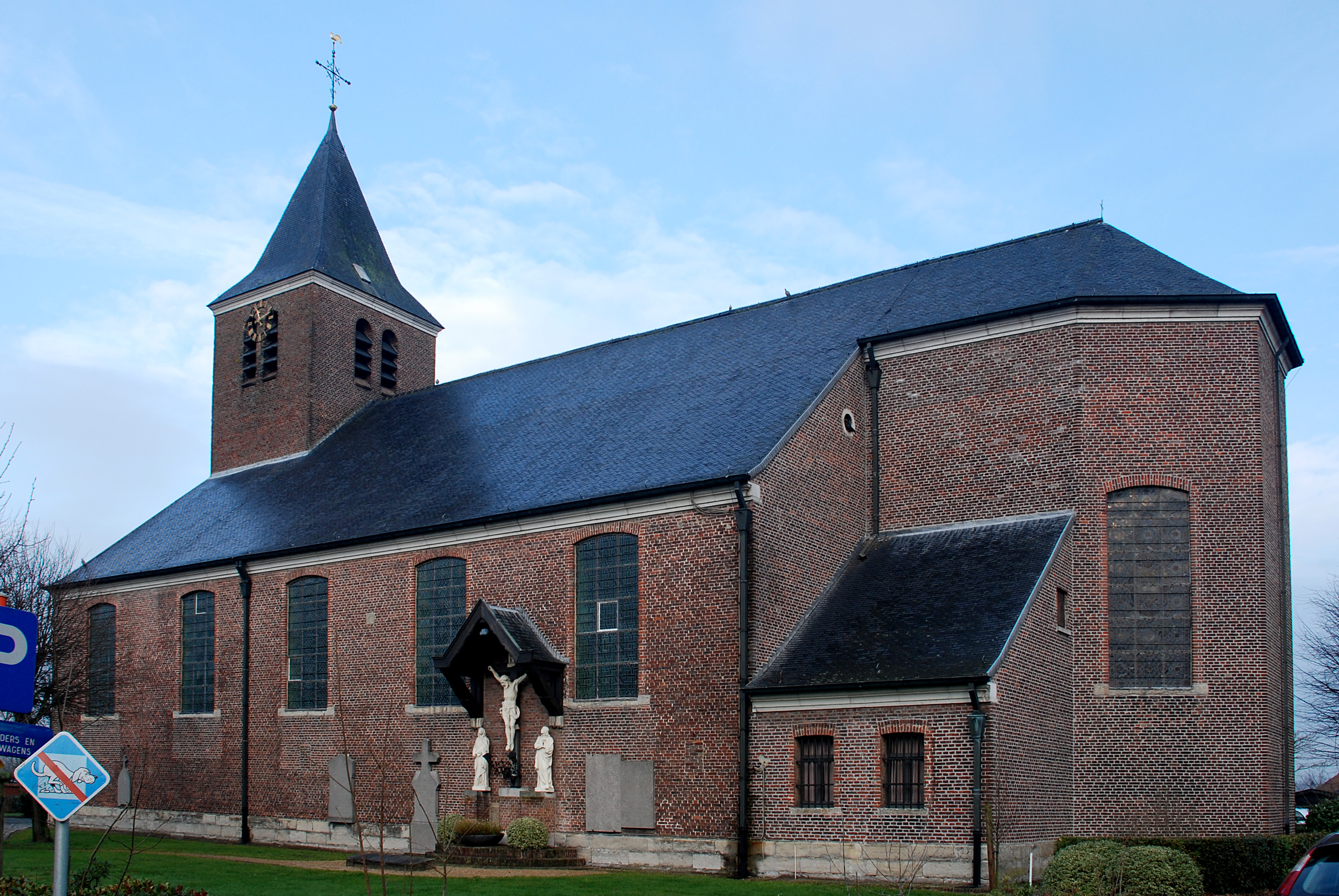
Heilig Kruis en Onze-Lieve-Vrouw Church

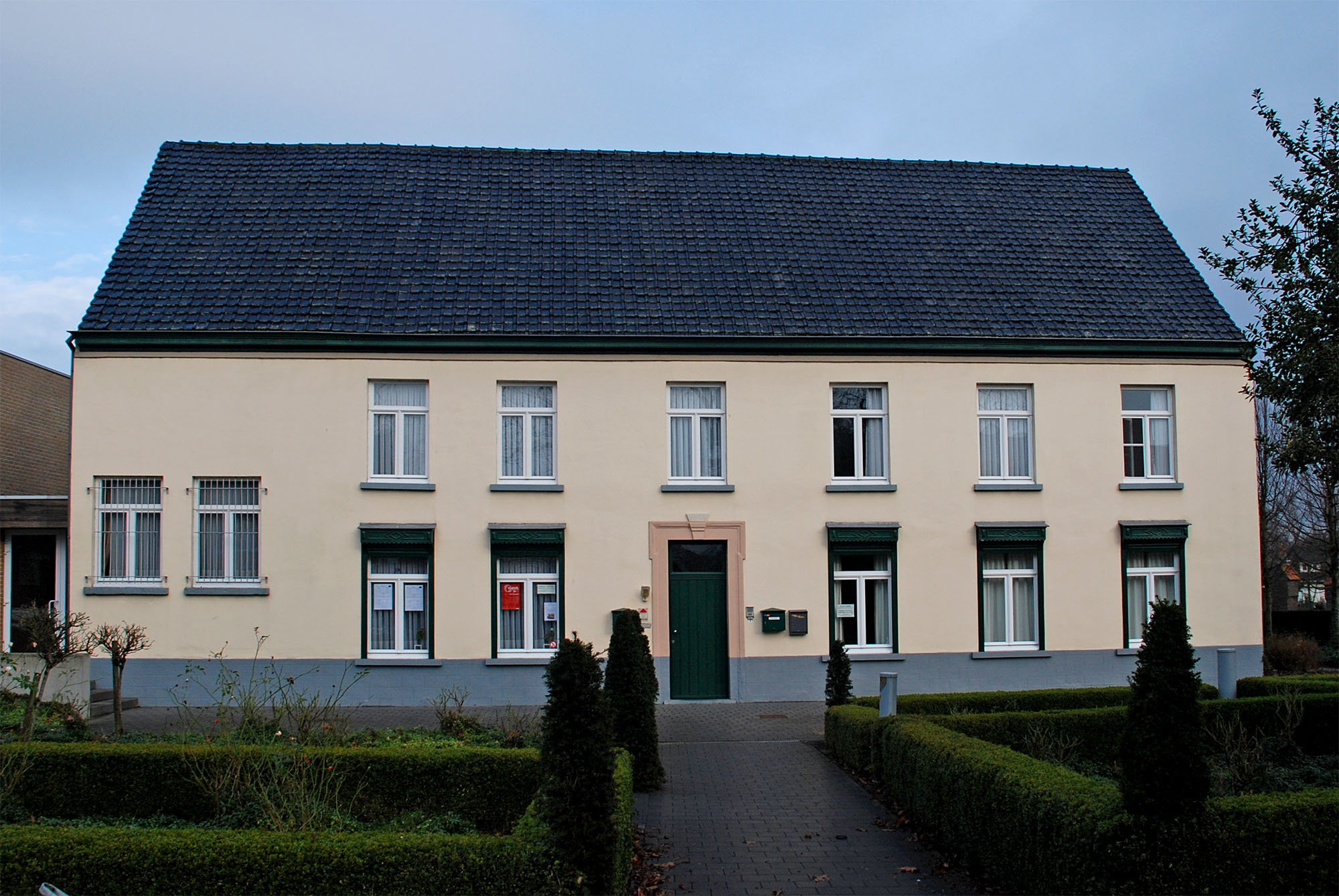
Former rectory

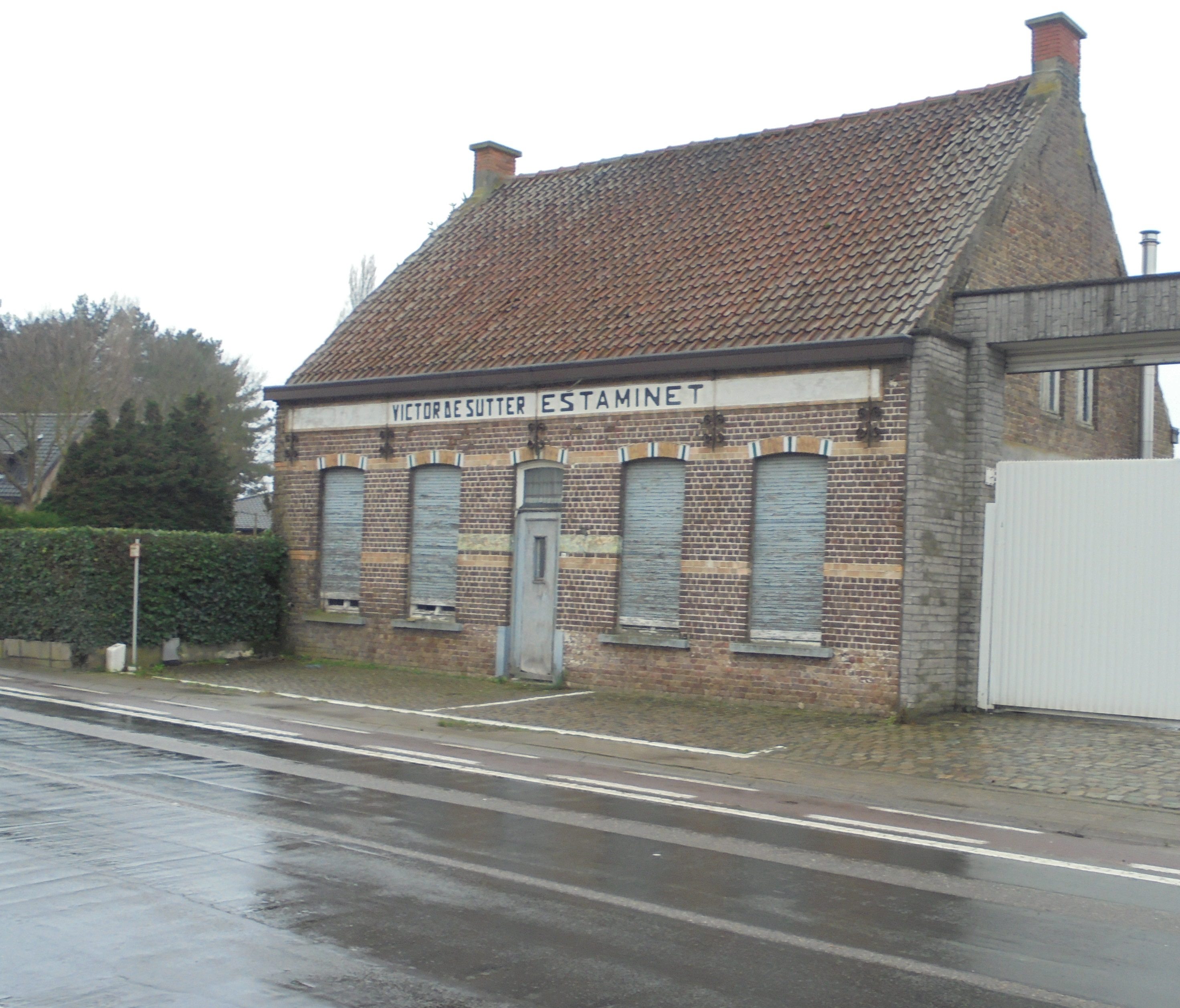
Former inn

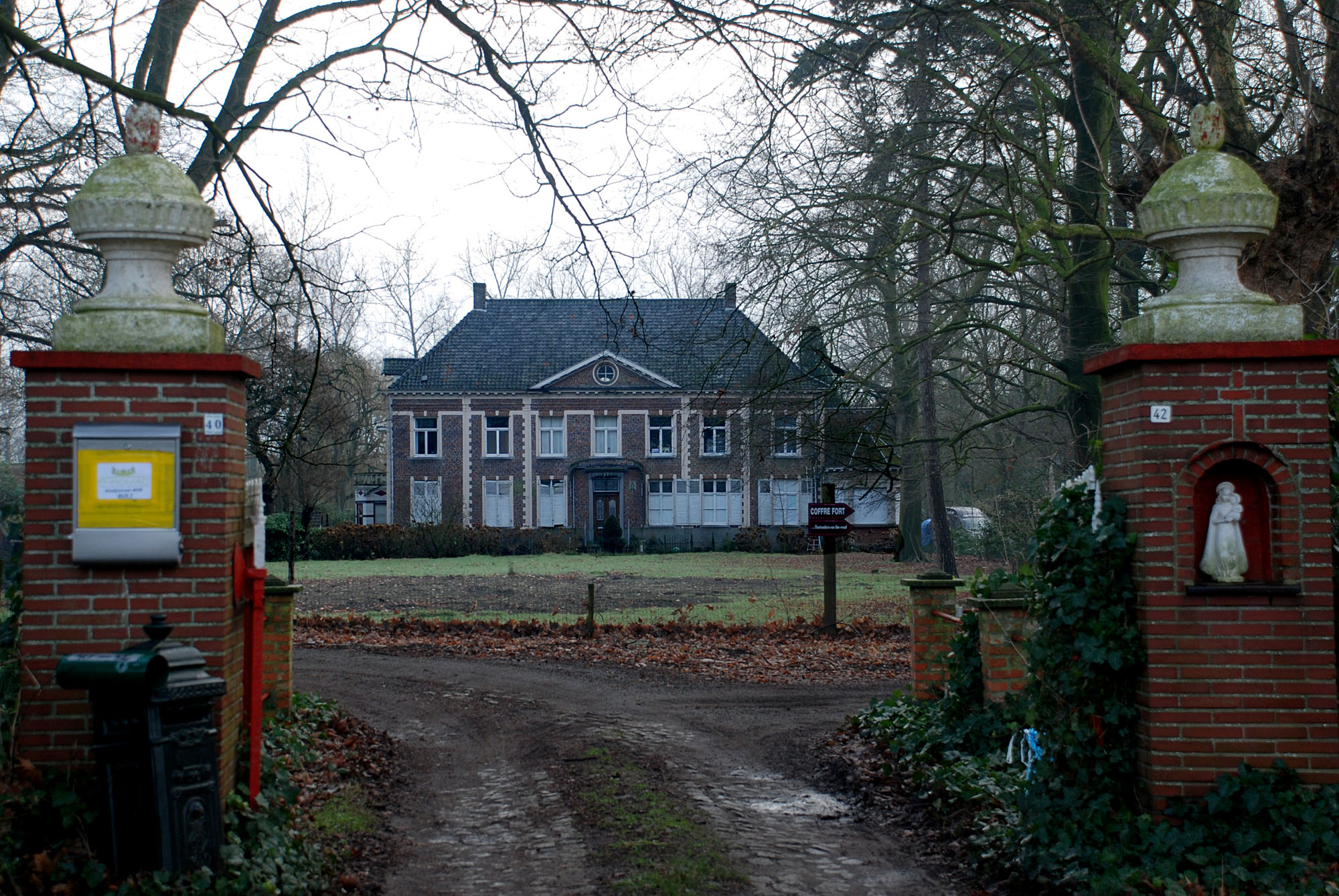
Estate in Oosteeklo
