= Assenede =

- Municipality
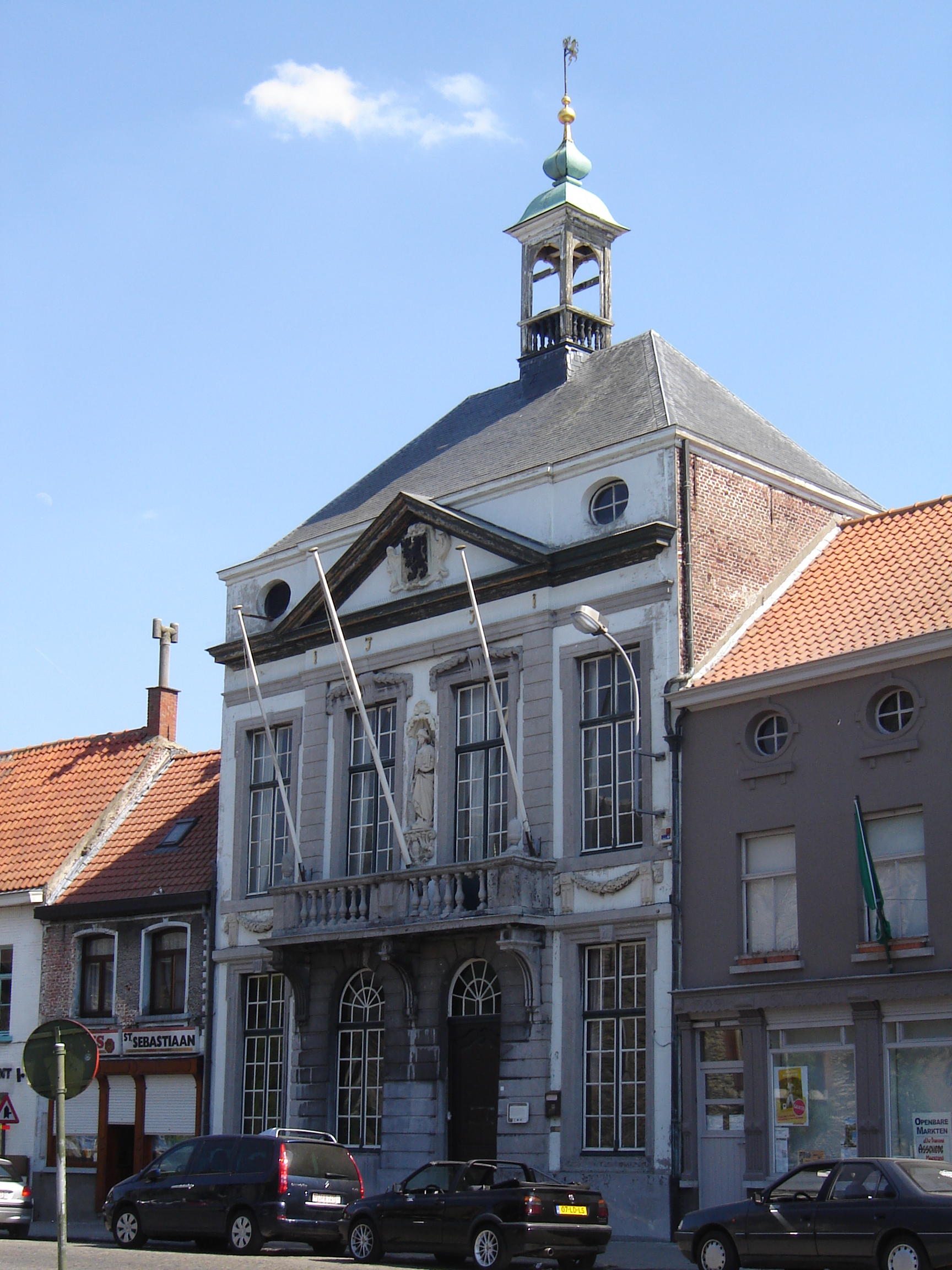
- Assenede old town hall

- Flag Coat of arms

- Location of Assenede in East Flanders
- Interactive map of Assenede
- Location in Belgium
- Coordinates: 51°14′N 03°45′E
- Country: Belgium
- Community: Flemish Community
- Region: Flemish Region
- Province: East Flanders
- Arrondissement: Eeklo

Government
  - Mayor: Philippe De Coninck
  - Governing party: Samenplus

Area
  - Total: 87.5 km^{2} (33.8 sq mi)

Population (2018-01-01)
  - Total: 14,200
  - Density: 162/km^{2} (420/sq mi)
- Postal codes: 9960, 9961, 9968
- NIS code: 43002
- Area codes: 09
- Website: www.assenede.be

Assenede (Dutch pronunciation: [ˈɑsəneːdə]) is a municipality located in the Belgian province of East Flanders. The municipality comprises the towns of Assenede proper, Bassevelde, Boekhoute and Oosteeklo. On 1 January 2021, Assenede had a total population of 14,369. The total area is 87.22 km^{2}.

== History ==
Assenede is one of the oldest villages in Flanders, the earliest mention of Assenede dates back to as early as the 10th century.

== Geography ==
Assenede stands on two different types of soil, to the west most of the land is pure sand and called "Houtland" (woodland), and the side towards the northeast is mainly polder of the marsh type because Assenede and Boekhoute bordered the sea during the Middle Ages. The harbor in Assenede disappeared around 1500 but a small canal called the Vliet maintained some access to the Boekhouter's harbor that existed much longer, and was present to around 1946. The last polder dyke was closed after that year. The creeks are nature reserves.

== Gallery ==
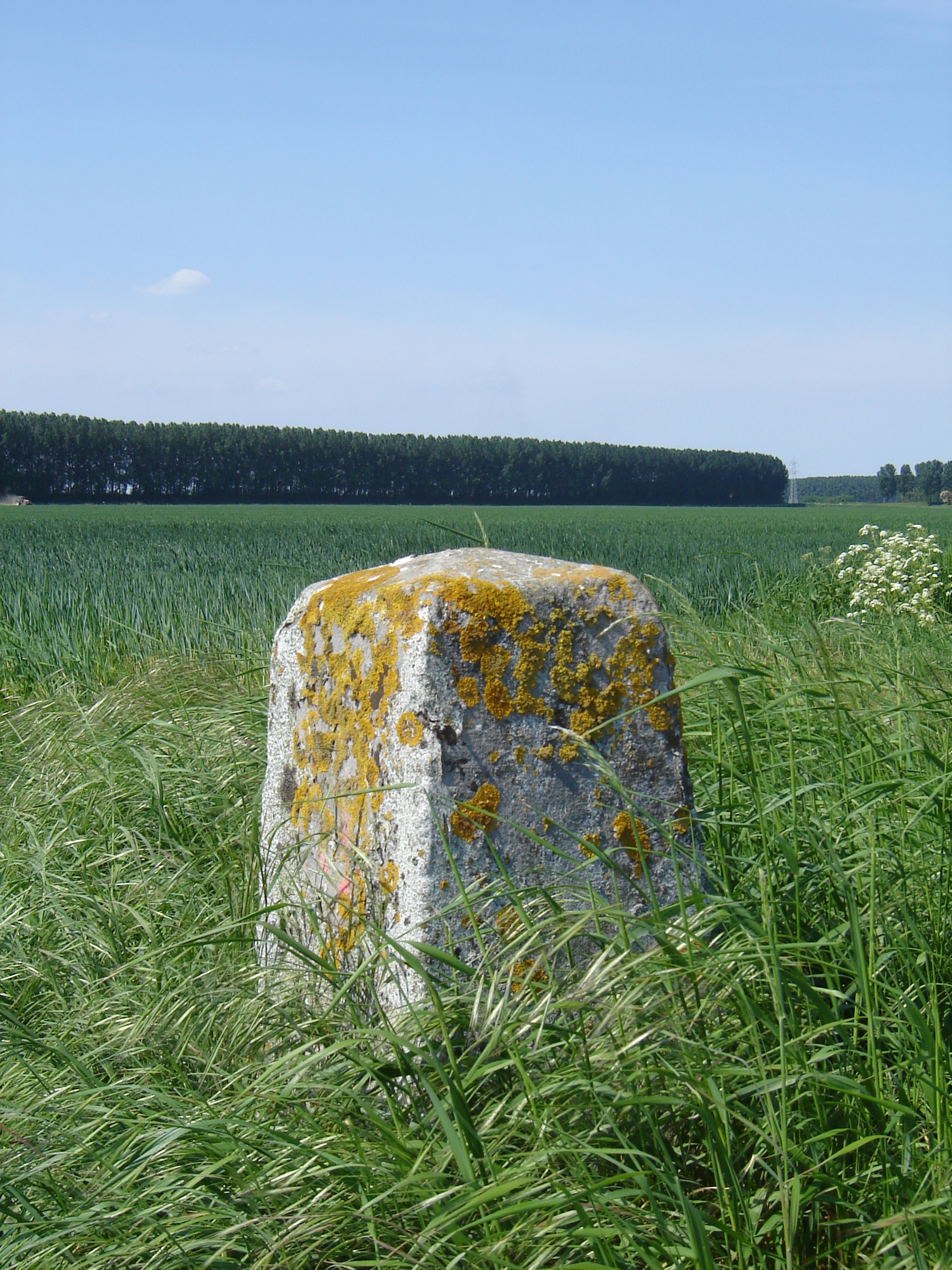
Border stone on the Belgian-Dutch border.

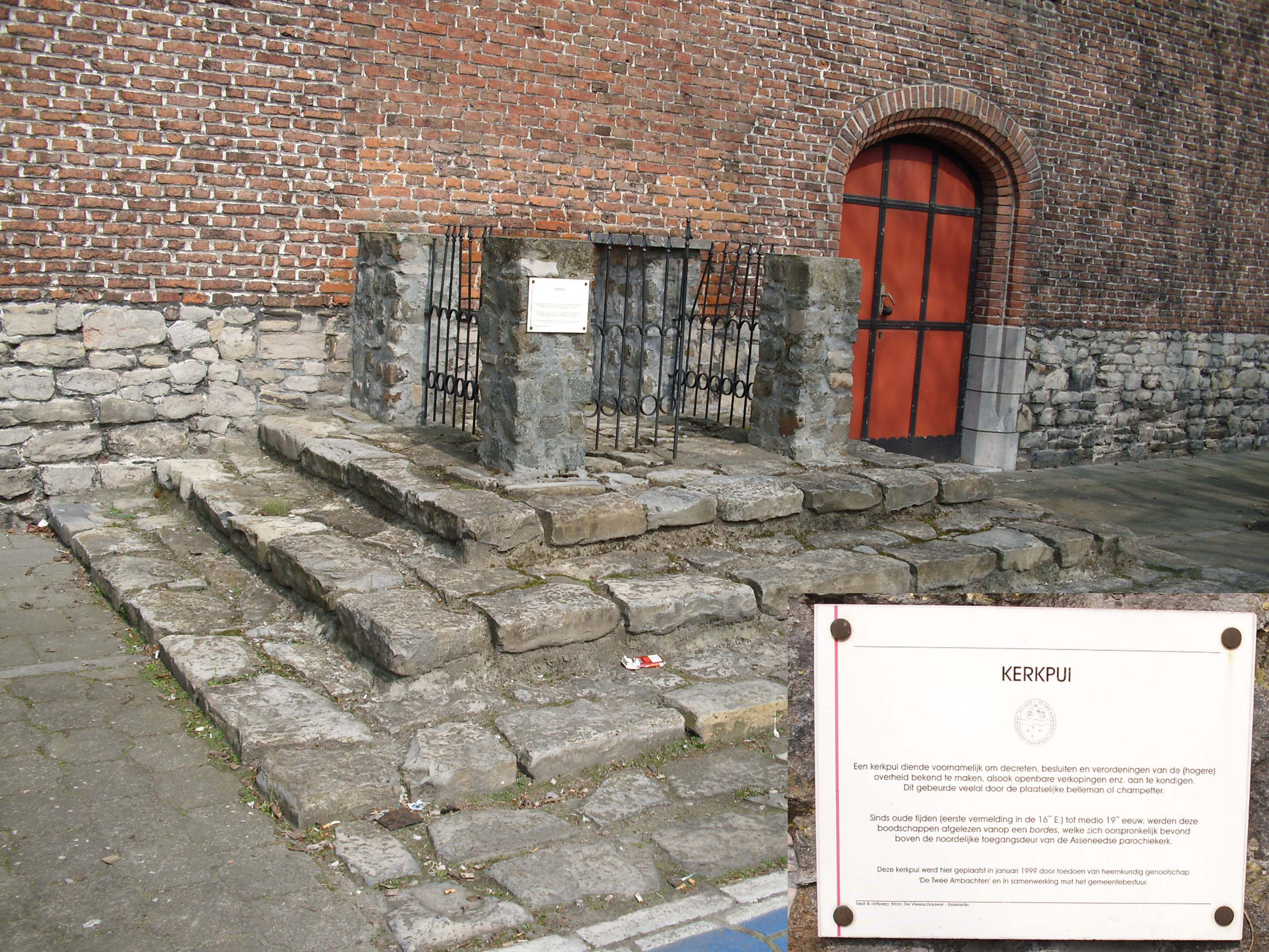
Assenede kerkpui

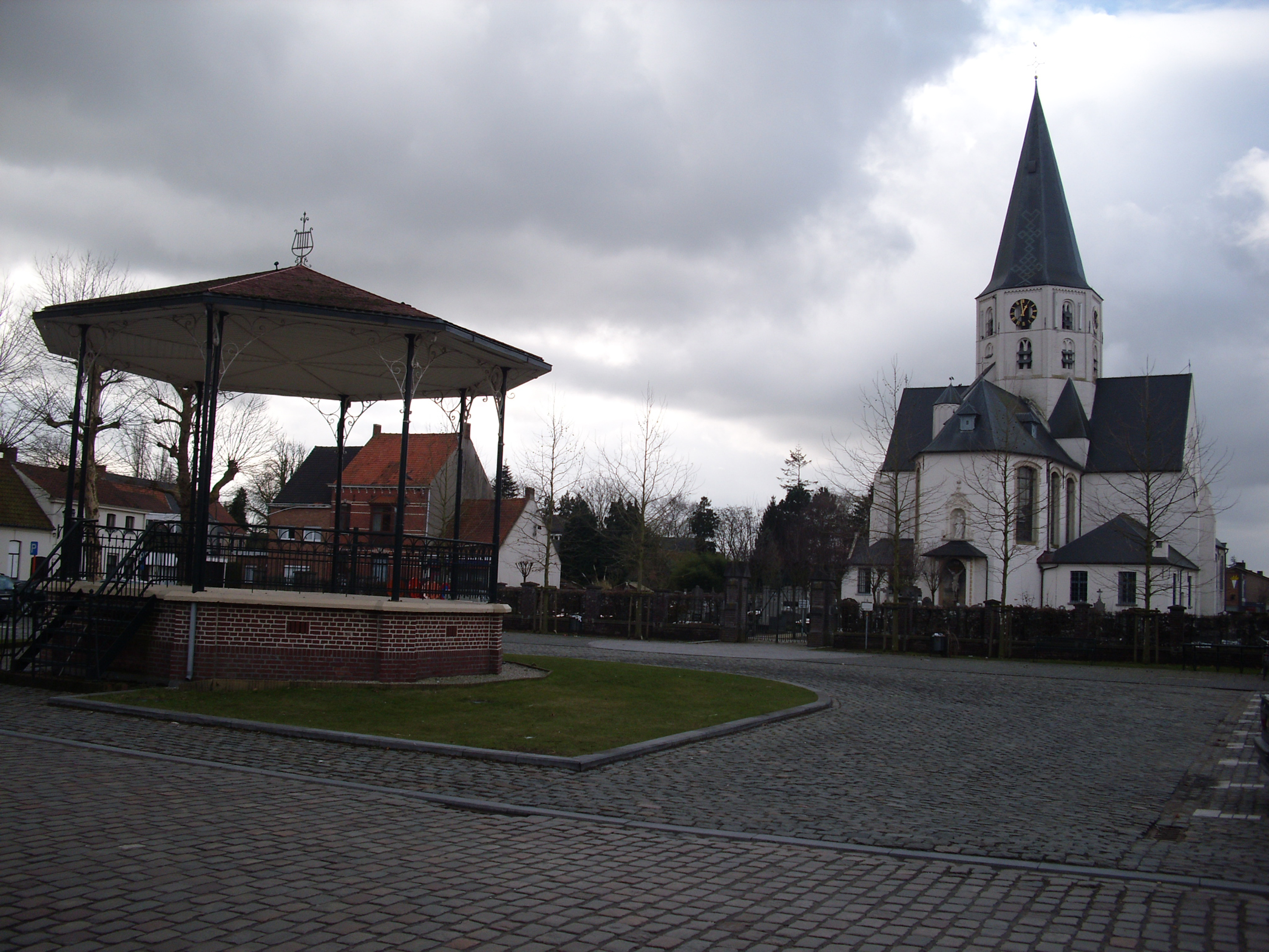
Church and kiosk in Bassevelde

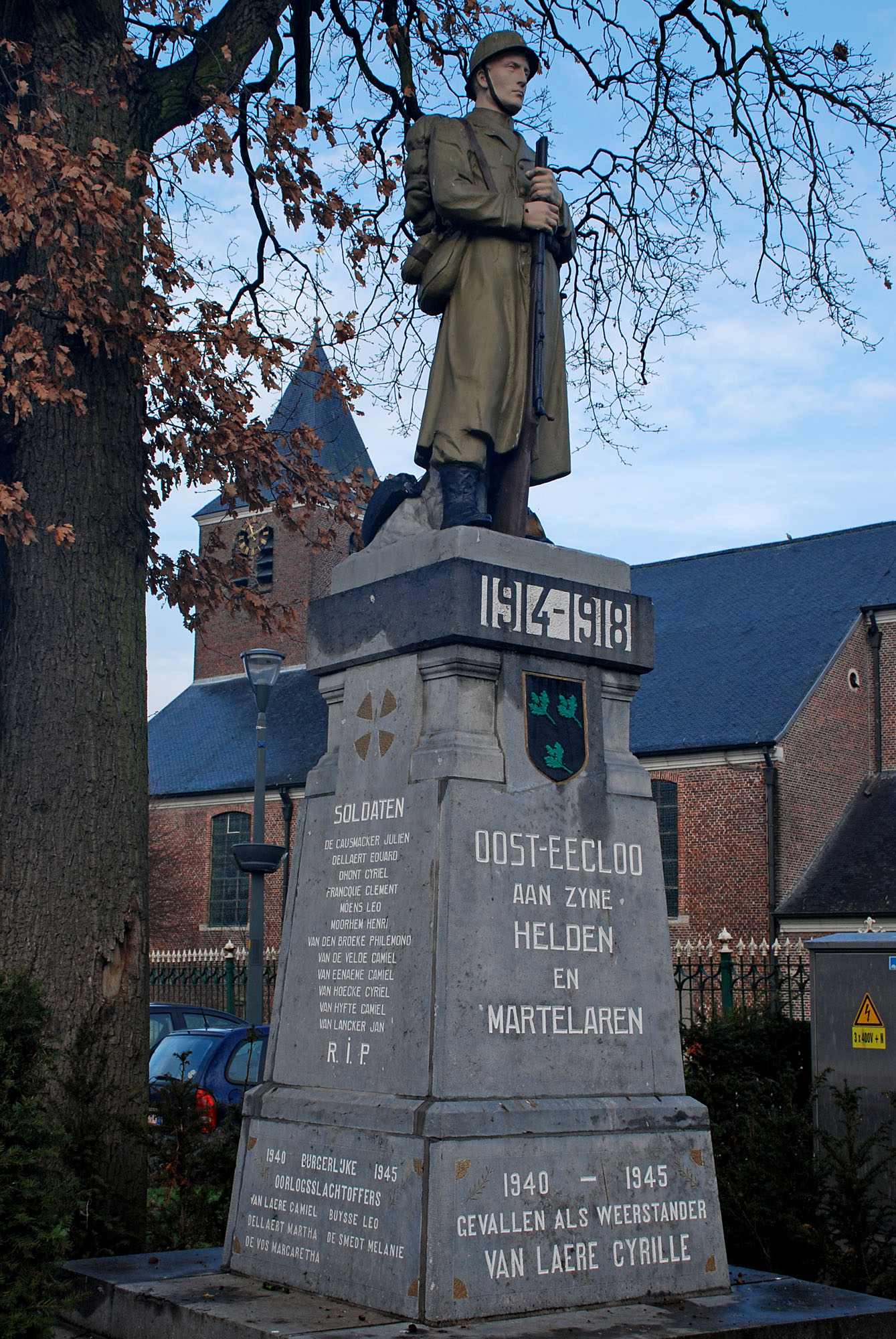
War memorial in Oosteeklo
