= Oosteeklo Abbey =

Cistercian nunnery in Belgium

- Abdij van Oosteeklo
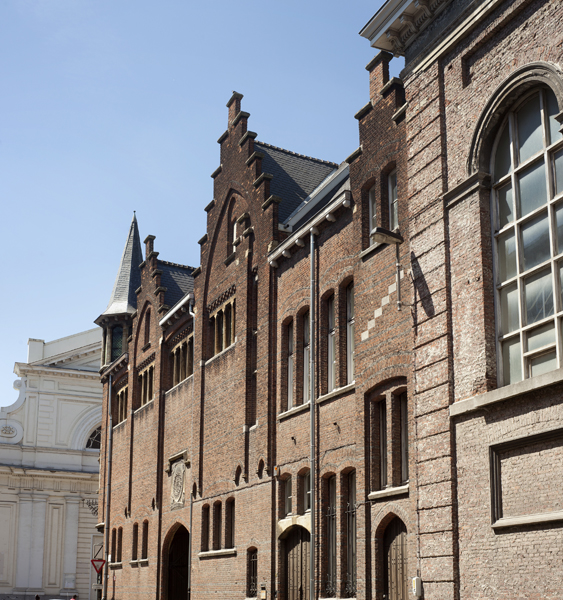
- Modern school on the former site of the abbey in Ghent

- Location within Belgium

Monastery information
- Order: Cistercian nuns
- Established: before 1217
- Disestablished: 1796/1842

Site
- Coordinates: 51.183419°N 3.686711°E

Oosteeklo Abbey was a Cistercian nunnery founded in Oosteeklo in the 12th century and later moved to Ghent.

== History ==
There are conflicting versions of the abbey's earliest foundation, with some writers suggesting a date as early as 1164. In 1249, the community was taken under the protection of Margaret II of Flanders, who gave the monastery permission to sell, exchange and develop the agricultural land in its possession, but retained control of the marshland and wasteland and charged the monastery an annual rent on these. The lay brothers and the secular tenants of the monastery played an important role in the medieval development of the sandy heathland around the village of Oosteeklo.

In 1246 the community obtained a papal bull from Innocent IV prohibiting creditors from seizing the abbey's goods. A monastery chapel was consecrated in 1296.

In 1577, during the Dutch Revolt, the abbey was plundered and razed. Seven surviving members of the community regrouped under Abbess Elisabeth Fransmans and in 1585 moved into the Posteernehof in the city of Ghent. Under Joanna de Hertoghe (died 1630), the abbey church was built in Ghent, and under Francisca vanden Steene (abbess 1636–1668) the refectory, chapter house and infirmary were built and the church decorated. In 1653, the abbess established a confraternity of St Bernard of Clairvaux.

While established in Ghent, the monastery did retain extensive property and rights in and around Oosteeklo. Their former guesthouse in the village, a 15th-century structure with later renovations, is now listed as built heritage. On 11 May 1666 Gerard de Baere, Abbot of Dunes, granted permission for a chapel with portable altar to be built on the former site of the abbey in Oosteeklo.

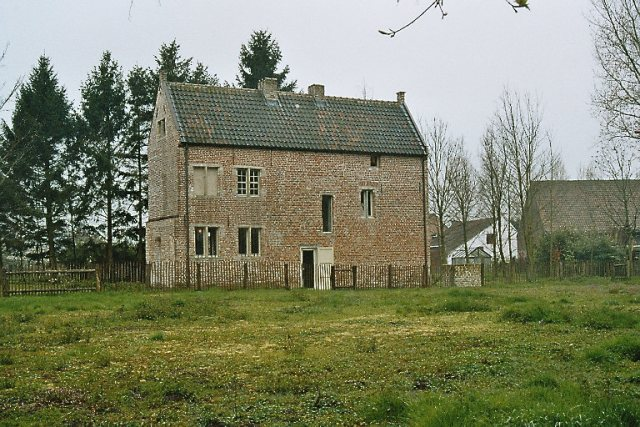
The former abbey guesthouse in Oosteeklo

In 1796 the Revolutionary authorities suppressed the house in Ghent and confiscated the building, which in 1797 was sold at public auction. The former nuns bought back the house through a front man, and continued to live in it as a clandestine community until 1814, when again officially recognised as a monastic house. Over the course of the subsequent few decades, the community died out. In 1842 the former monastery buildings were transferred to the Jesuits, and in the early 20th century to the De La Salle Brothers.

== Abbesses ==
The abbesses listed in the Gallia Christiana, vol. 5 (Paris, 1731), 227–228, are as follows.

- Isabella (died 1230)
- Egidia de Salsyne (died 1267)
- Lyna Trys (died 1286)
- Lyna de Boulers (died 1288)
- Ida Dammand (died 1290)
- Agnes van Hove (died 1308)
- Heylsoeta de Rocleers (died 1310)
- Maria Keelcapons (died 1322)
- Belina van Somerghem (died 1333)
- Clara Tollins (died 1364)
- Margareta vanden Berghe (died 1382)
- Margareta van Wilsem (died 1405)
- Catharina d'Appers (died 1440)
- Margareta vanden Voorde (died 1442)
- Catharina Seysens (died 1468)
- Clara Smeyers (died 1478)
- Christiana Laus (died 1488)
- Catharina van Raveschot (resigned after 14 months)
- Margareta Poleyts (died 1492)
- Agnes Cabelliau (died 1499)
- Gentina de Mastin (died 1504)
- Catharina de Beer (died 1527)
- Anna de Pottelsberghe (died 1531)
- Philippina de Mastin (died 1536)
- Johanna Sanders (died 1583)
- Elisabeth Fransmans (died 1610)
- Joanna de Hertoghe (died 1630)
- Maria de Brunswyck (died 1634), daughter of the Duke of Brunswick
- Francisca vanden Steene (died 1668)
- Isabella Clara Eugenia de Huchin, a goddaughter of Isabella Clara Eugenia (died 1722, aged 92)
- Juliana vanden Bogaerde of Bruges (died 1725, aged 66)
- Maria Alexandrina Coene of Ghent (enthroned 2 September 1725)
