= Jan Pepermans =

17th-century printer and bookseller

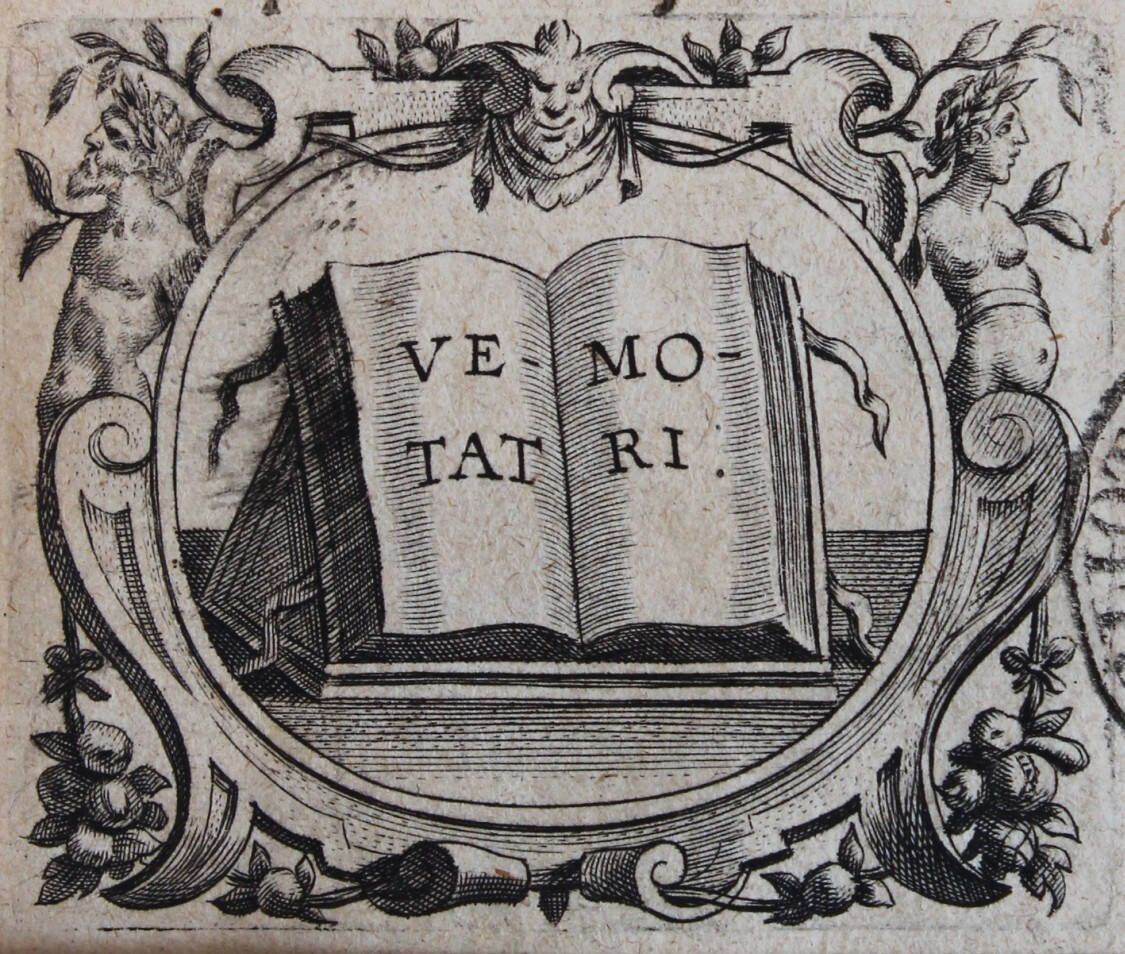
- Printer's mark of Jan Pepermans as used in Aubertus Miraeus (1624). Rervm Belgicarvm annales, . Motto: vetat mori
- Occupations: printer, publisher and bookseller
- Years active: 1620–1633
- Era: handpress
- Employer: City of Brussels
- Notable work: Jean Puget de la Serre, Mausolee erigé à la memoire d'Isabelle-Claire-Eugenie (1634)

Jan Pepermans or Jan Pepermans I, sometimes Latinized as Joannes Pepermannus and in French Jean Pepermans (active 1620–1635) was a 17th-century printer, publisher and bookseller and an official printer of the city of Brussels. He published works by or about some of the leading figures at the Brussels court.

== Archival records ==
Very little is known about his life. In 1634 he was paid £150 for printing a memorial to the Infanta Isabella Clara Eugenia, Mausolee erigé à la memoire d'Isabelle-Claire-Eugenie by Jean Puget de la Serre.

== Publications ==
1621

- Michel Salon, Een cleyn beworp des levens ende miraeckelen van den H. Thomas Van Villa-Nova – a life of Thomas of Villanova
- Aubertus Miraeus, De Bello bohemico, Ferdinandi II Caesaris auspiciis, feliciter gesto commentarius – A commentary on the Bohemian Revolt from a Habsburg perspective
- N. N., Copie d'une lettre qu'un seigneur de la court escrivit à un sien amis sur le trespas du roy Don Phelipe Troisiesme d'Espagnol, translated from Spanish to French by Jan vander Heyden – an account of the death of Philip III of Spain
- Claude Chappuisot, Oraison funebre sur la mort de ce Treshaut, Trespuisant, et Trescatholique Prince Albert Archiduc d'Autriche – a funerary oration for Albert VII, Archduke of Austria
- Copie d'une lettre, q'un seigneur de la court escrivit a un sien amis sur le trespas du roy don Phelippe troisiesme

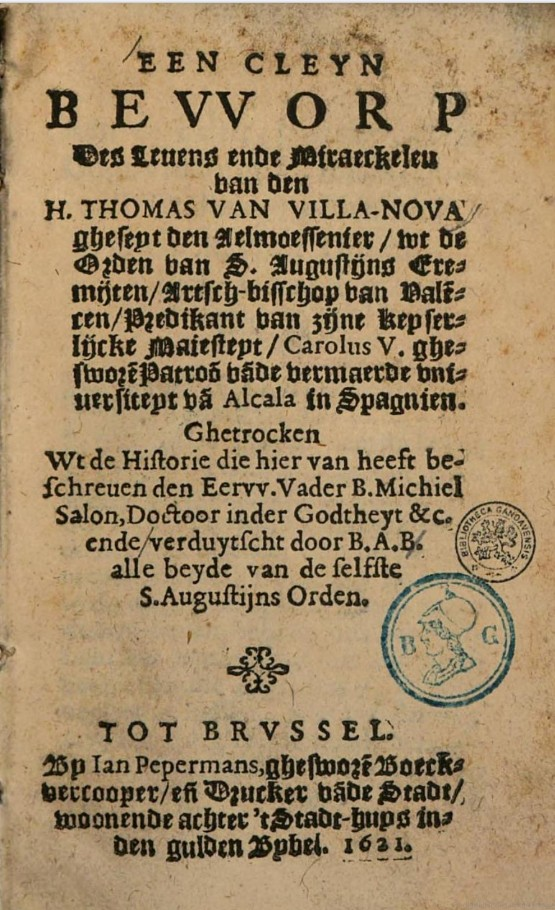
Title page of Michel Salon, Een cleyn beworp des levens ende miraeckelen van den H. Thomas Van Villa-Nova (1621)

1622

- Funérailles du sérénissime prince archiduc Albert, représentées par les escholiers du collège de la Compagnie de Jésus
- Sanctorum Ignati et Xaveri in divos relatorum triumphus Bruxellae ab aula et urbe celebratus – an account of the celebration in Brussels of the canonisations of Ignatius Loyola and Francis Xavier.
- Isabel Clara Eugenia byde Gratie Gods– a decree on the lodging of soldiers
- Aubertus Miraeus, Serenissimi Alberti Belgarum principis elogium et funus – a eulogy of Archduke Albert
- Aubertus Miraeus, Isabellae sanctae : Elisabetha Joannis Bapt. mater, Elisabetha Andr. regis Hung. filia, Isabella regina Portugalliae, Isabella, S. Lud. Galliae regis soror – on various saints named Isabel or Elizabeth
- Aubertus Miraeus, Fasti belgici et burgundici – on the saints celebrated or venerated in the Low Countries and Franche-Comté.
- Aubertus Miraeus, Elenchus historicorum et aliorum scriptorum – a finding list of unpublished historical manuscripts in libraries in the Low Countries
- Monasterii Viridis Vallis in Sonia silva, prope Bruxellam – on Groenendael Priory
- Crisóstomo Henríquez, Vita Joannis Rusbroquii– a life of John of Ruysbroeck

1623

- Andres de Soto, Contemplaciones del crucifixo: y consideraciones de Christo crucificado, y de los dolores que la Virgen sanctissima padescio al pie de la cruz – contemplations on the crucifix

1624

- Francis Bell, The Rule of the Religious, of the Thirde Order of Saint Francis: For both sexes, making the three vowes, and living together in communitie and cloyster
- Crisóstomo Henríquez, Fasciculus sanctorum Ordinis Cisterciensis, complectens Cisterciensium ascetarum praeclarissima gesta, huius Ordinis exordium, incrementum, progressum, praecipuarum abbatiarum per universum orbem fundationes
- Aubertus Miraeus, Rerum Belgicarum Annales
- Theatrum Iaponiensis constantiae qua supra centum octodecim illustrissimi martyres atrocissimis suppliciis excruciati anno M.DC.XXII. pro fide Iesu Christi per ignem et gladium et aquam coronam gloria reportaverunt – on the Great Genna Martyrdom in Nagasaki in 1622

1625

- Ambrosio de Salazar, Las Clavellinas de recreation: donde se contienen Sentencias, avisos, exemplos, y Historias muy agradables, en dos lenguas, Francesa y Castellana – a bilingual collection of anecdotes and short stories
- Andres de Soto, Beschouwinghen op het kruycifix ende op de smerten welcke de heylighste Maghet Maria lede aen den voedt des Kruys – Dutch translation of Contemplacion del crucifixo (1623 above) by Jan van Blitterswyck
- François Paludanus, Brief discours de la vie, vertue et miracles du bienheureux père Jacques de la Marque – a life of St James of the Marches

1626

- Tragi-comedie, onse lieve vrouwe van Peys. Tot vereeringhe van het beeldt Maria Pacis, ghestelt voor het broodt-huys door haere doorluchtichste hoocheydt Isabella Clara Eugenia infante van Spanien, &c. – Jesuit student drama performed 22 September 1626
- Den gulden sonnen wyser oft horologie van de passie ons heeren Jesu Christi

1627

- Antonius Sanderus, Gandavum sive Gandavensium rerum libri sex
- Defence de la Verité et Responce du Sieur de Brion contre l'Imposture calumnieuse du libelle diffamatoire publié sous le nom de manifeste de Maximilian de Billehé

1630

- Tooneel van de moedigheydt van vier predicanten binnen s'Hertoghen-bosch: Ende cloeckveerdicheyt van twee catholijcke proffessoren binnen Lueven

1632

- Jean-Jacques Courvoisier, Extases de la princesse du Midy, la belle Malceda, au palais du sage roy Salomon
- Basilius Pontius, De sacramento matrimonii tractatus
- Ogier Ghislain de Busbecq, Epistolarum Legationis Gallicae

1633

- Tombeau erigé a la memoire de celle qui fut tres-haulte, tres-puissante, tres-vertueuse,& magnanime princesse, Isabelle, Claire, Eugenie, infante des Espaignes, dame souveraine des Pays-bas

1634

- City of Brussels, Reglement, op het onderhouden vande sondagen ende H. daghen
- Jean Puget de la Serre, Mausolee erige a la memoire d'Isabelle-Claire-Eugenie
- Jean de Wachtendonck, Oratio funebris Isabellae Clarae Eugeniae Hispaniarum infantis

1635

- Discours sur la rencontre du temps et des affaires presente par un vieulx cavalier francois a monseigneur le duc Dorleans
- Lettre de sa Majesté Imperiale a son agent a Rome, contenant les raisons pour lesquelles il a faict la paix avec le Duc de Saxe M. DC. XXXV
- Libre & sincère discours d'un serviteur très-humble & très-affectionné à la Coronne de France
- Den schenck van den Prince van Orangien, van de Schenkel-schans, aen den Prins van Spagnien
