= Wilhelm Jordaens =

Augustinian canon of Groenendael Priory (died 1372)

Start of De mystieke mondkus

Wilhelm Jordaens (Latin: Wilhelmus Jordani; died 23 November 1372) was an Augustinian canon of Groenendael Priory who wrote in both Latin and Middle Dutch and also translated the Dutch works of the mystic Jan van Ruysbroeck.

== Life ==
Jordaens was born in Brussels. He was of noble birth, being the son of Jordaen van Heerzele, a cupbearer to Duchess Jeanne of Brabant, and his wife Katherine. His birth has been dated to 1321–1322, but this is highly speculative. He probably received his primary education in the liberal arts at the church of Saints Michael and Gudula. He was an ordained priest and a magister when he joined Groenendael around 1350, probably having completed his education at the University of Paris.

The only sure dates in his life are provided by his obituary in the necrology of Groenendael. These are 1358, when he wrote a lament for a deceased deacon, and 1372, the date of his death. The day of his death was 23 November.

== Works ==
Jordaens wrote a planctus (lament) on the death of a deacon in 1358, Planctus super obitu fratris Johannis de Speculo, alias de Cureghem.

Jordaens translated at least four of Jan van Ruysbroeck's works from Middle Dutch into Latin:

- The Adornment of the Spiritual Marriage
- The Seven Steps of the Ladder of Spiritual Love
- The Spiritual Tabernacle
- The Spiritual Espousals

He also translated Henry Suso's Hundred Articles on the Passion from a Middle Dutch version.

Jordaens also wrote his own vernacular mystical works in the tradition of Ruysbroeck. His Avellana (or Conflictus virtutum et viciorum) is a debate between the virtues and the vices in the form of a dream vision with elements of an estates satire. The sole surviving manuscript of the Avellana, formerly of the Rouge Cloître, is now found in the Austrian National Library, Codex Series nova 12828. This contains the Latin text, although a scribal note indicates that the poem written in both Latin and Middle Dutch.

De mystieke mondkus, also known by the Latin titles De oris osculo (The Kiss of the Mouth) and De osculo amoris (The Kiss of Love), is a mystical treatise in Middle Dutch. It is preserved in two manuscripts and is considered a masterpiece of 14th-century Dutch literature and of later medieval spirituality. It presents a person's relationship with God as a courtship progressing to a kiss on the mouth.

== Bibliography ==
- Colledge, Edmund (1969). "Review of Reypens 1967". Medium Ævum. 38 (3): 333–336. JSTOR 43627581.
- Desoer, Bernard (1977). William Jordaens's De ornatu spiritualium nuptiarum: A Critical Edition and Introduction (PhD diss.). McGill University.
- Johnson, Lawrence J., ed. (1985). Wilhelm Jordaens's Avellana: A Fourteenth-Century Virtue–Vice Debate. The Medieval Academy of America.
- Önnerfors, Alf, ed. (1986). Willem Jordaens: Conflictus virtutum et viciorum. VS Verlag für Sozialwissenschaften.
- Reypens, Léonce, ed. (1967). Mester Willem Jordaens: De oris osculo of de mystieke mondkus. Antwerp.
- Ruh, Kurt (2000). "Willem Jordaens' Mondkus (De oris osculo)". In Walter Haug; Wolfram Schneider-Lastin (eds.). Deutsche Mystik im abendländischen Zusammenhang: Neu erschlossene Texte, neue methodische Ansätze, neue theoretische Konzepte. Kolloquium Kloster Fischingen 1998. Max Niemeyer Verlag. pp. 707–716.
- Van Nieuwenhove, Rik; Faesen, Robert; Rolfson, Helen, eds. (2008). Late Medieval Mysticism of the Low Countries. Paulist Press.
- Van Nieuwenhove, Rik (2014). "Ruusbroec, Jordaens, and Herp on the Common Life: The Transformation of a Spiritual Ideal". In John Arblaster; Rob Faesen (eds.). A Companion to John of Ruusbroec. Brill. pp. 204–236.
