= Humility =

Quality of being humble

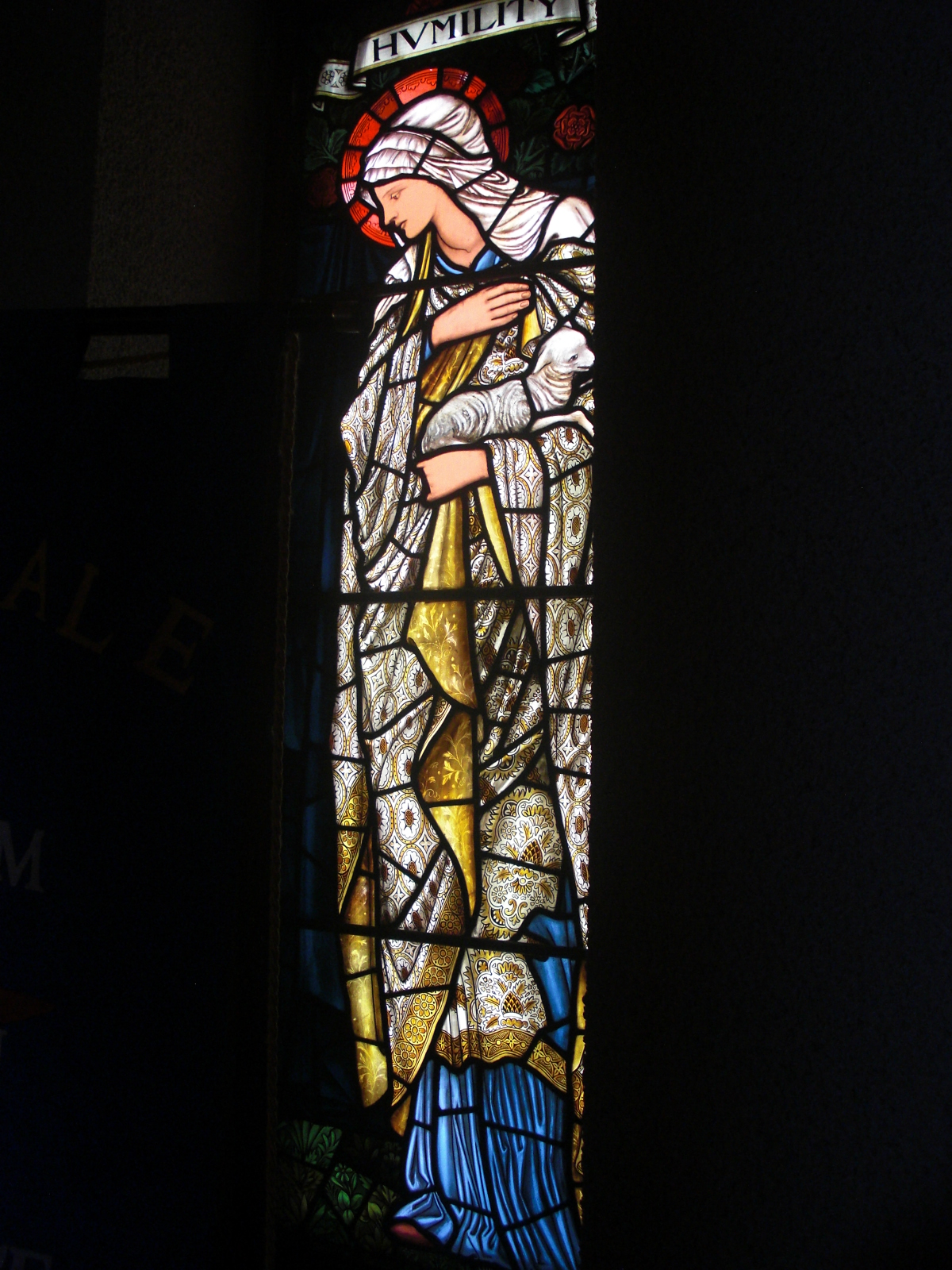
Representation of 'Humility' in a stained-glass window designed by Edward Burne-Jones

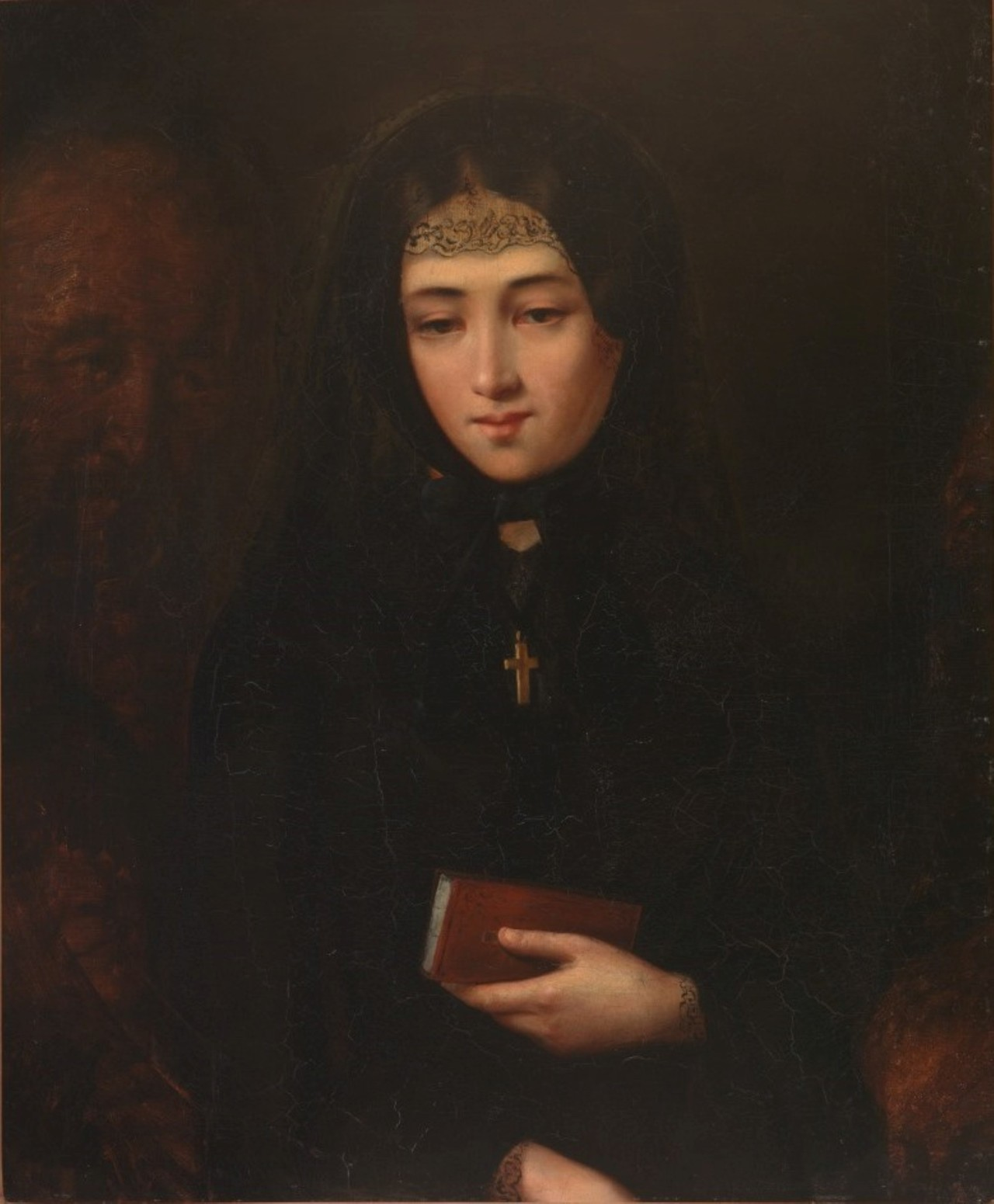
Tadeusz Gorecki, Humility

Humility is the quality of being humble and kind. While older definitions, such as the 1998 Oxford Dictionary entry, described humility as having a "low opinion of oneself" or "not being proudful", more recent psychological and philosophical definitions emphasize having an "accurate opinion of oneself". This modern view includes expressing modesty appropriately, possessing clear goal orientation, openness, broad-mindedness, and a non-imposing mentality.

Humility also refers to a proper sense of self-regard. It may be misinterpreted as the capacity to endure humiliation through self-denigration, with this misconception arising from the confusion of humility with traits like submissiveness and meekness.

== Etymology ==
The term "humility" comes from the Latin noun humilitas, related to the adjective humilis, which may be translated as "humble", but also as "grounded" or "from the earth", since it derives from the word humus (earth).

The word "humble" may be related to feudal England where the least valuable cuts of meat (whatever was left after the members of the upper class had taken their parts), or "umbles", were provided to the lowest class of citizens.

== Religious views on humility ==
In a religious context, humility can mean a self-recognition of a deity and subsequent submission to that deity as a religious member. Outside of a religious context, humility is defined as being "unselved," or liberated from the consciousness of self, a form of temperance that is neither having pride (or haughtiness) nor indulging in self-deprecation.

In both religious and philosophical contexts, humility can be regarded as a virtue that prioritizes social harmony, striking a balance between two sets of qualities. This equilibrium lies in having a reduced focus on oneself, which leads to a proportionate sense of self-importance and diminished arrogance, while also possessing the ability to demonstrate strength, assertiveness, and courage. This virtue is exhibited in the pursuit of upholding social harmony and recognizing our human dependence on it. It contrasts with maliciousness, hubris, and other negative forms of pride and is an idealistic and rare intrinsic construct that has an extrinsic side.

=== Abrahamic ===
==== Judaism ====
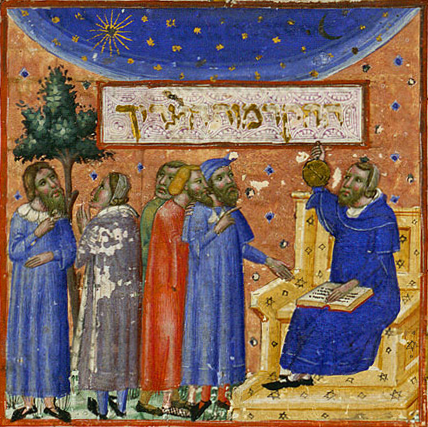
Maimonides teaches about the "measure of man" (compared to the earth and the universe, man is very small).

Rabbi Lord Jonathan Sacks states that, in Judaism, humility is an appreciation of oneself, and one's talents, skills, and virtues. It is not meekness or self-deprecating thought, but the effacing of oneself to something higher. Humility is not to think lowly of oneself, but to appreciate the self one is. In recognition of the mysteries and complexities of life, one becomes humbled by the vastness of what one is and what one can achieve.

Rabbi Pini Dunner discusses that humility is to place others first; it is to appreciate others' worth as important. Rabbi Dunner states that Moses wrote in the Torah, "And Moses was exceedingly humble, more than any man on the face of the earth" (Numbers 12:3). Dunner recognizes what seems to be a paradox in the passage, that one who claims to be humble comes across as arrogant. However, Dunner concludes that believing highly of yourself is not arrogant when one recognizes that power comes from God.

The deuterocanonical Book of Sirach section on humility in chapter 3, commences, "My son, conduct your affairs with humility, and you will be loved more than a giver of gifts". The editors of the New American Bible Revised Edition suggest that the writer "is perhaps warning his students [in this section] against the perils of Greek philosophy".

Amongst the benefits of humility described in the Hebrew Bible, which is shared by many faiths, are honor, wisdom, prosperity, the protection of the Lord, and peace. In addition, "God opposes the proud but gives grace to the humble" (Proverbs 3:34) is another phrase in the Hebrew Bible that values humility and humbleness.

==== General Christianity ====
Do nothing out of selfish ambition or vain conceit. Rather, in humility value others above yourselves, not looking to your own interests but each of you to the interests of the others. In your relationships with one another, have the same mindset as Christ Jesus: Who, being in very nature God, did not consider equality with God something to be used to his own advantage; rather, he made himself nothing by taking the very nature of a servant, being made in human likeness. And being found in appearance as a man, he humbled himself by becoming obedient to death—even death on a cross!

— Philippians 2:3–8

The New Testament exhortations to humility are found in many places, for example, "Blessed are the meek" (Matthew 5:5), "He who exalts himself will be humbled and he who humbles himself will be exalted" (Matthew 23:12), as well as (Philippians 2:1–17) and throughout the Book of James.

Jesus Christ's behavior and submission to unjust torture and execution in particular are examples of righteous humility: "Who, when he was reviled, did not revile: when he suffered, he threatened not: but delivered himself to him that judged him justly" (1 Peter 2:23).

C. S. Lewis writes in Mere Christianity that pride is the "anti-God" state, the position in which the ego and the self are directly opposed to God: "Unchastity, anger, greed, drunkenness, and all that are mere fleabites in comparison: it was through pride that the devil became the devil: pride leads to every other vice: it is the complete anti-God state of mind."

In contrast, Lewis contends that in Christian moral teaching the opposite of pride is humility. This is popularly illustrated by a phrase wrongly attributed to Lewis, "Humility is not thinking less of yourself, but thinking of yourself less." This is an apparent paraphrase, by Rick Warren in The Purpose Driven Life, of a passage found in Mere Christianity: Lewis writes, regarding the truly humble man.

Do not imagine that if you meet a really humble man he will be what most people call "humble" nowadays: he will not be a sort of greasy, smarmy person, who is always telling you that, of course, he is nobody. Probably all you will think about him is that he seemed a cheerful, intelligent chap who took a real interest in what you said to him. If you do dislike him it will be because you feel a little envious of anyone who seems to enjoy life so easily. He will not be thinking about humility: he will not be thinking about himself at all.

— C. S. Lewis, Mere Christianity

One with humility is said to be a fit recipient of grace; according to the words of Saint James, "God opposes the proud but gives grace to the humble" (Proverbs 3:34, 1 Peter 5:5, James 4:6).

"True" humility differs from "false" humility: the latter consists of deprecating one's own sanctity, gifts, talents, and accomplishments for the sake of receiving praise or adulation from others. This has been personified by the fictional character Uriah Heep created by Charles Dickens. In this context legitimate humility comprises the following behaviors and attitudes:

- submitting to God and legitimate authority;
- recognizing virtues and talents that others possess, particularly those that surpass one's own, and giving due honor and, when required, obedience;
- recognizing the limits of one's talents, ability, or authority.

The vices opposed to humility are:

- Pride;
- Too great obsequiousness or abjection of oneself; this would be considered an excess of humility and could easily be derogatory to one's office or holy character; or it might serve only to pamper pride in others, by unworthy flattery, which would occasion their sins of tyranny, arbitrariness, and arrogance. The virtue of humility may not be practiced in any external way that would occasion vices in others.

===== Catholicism =====
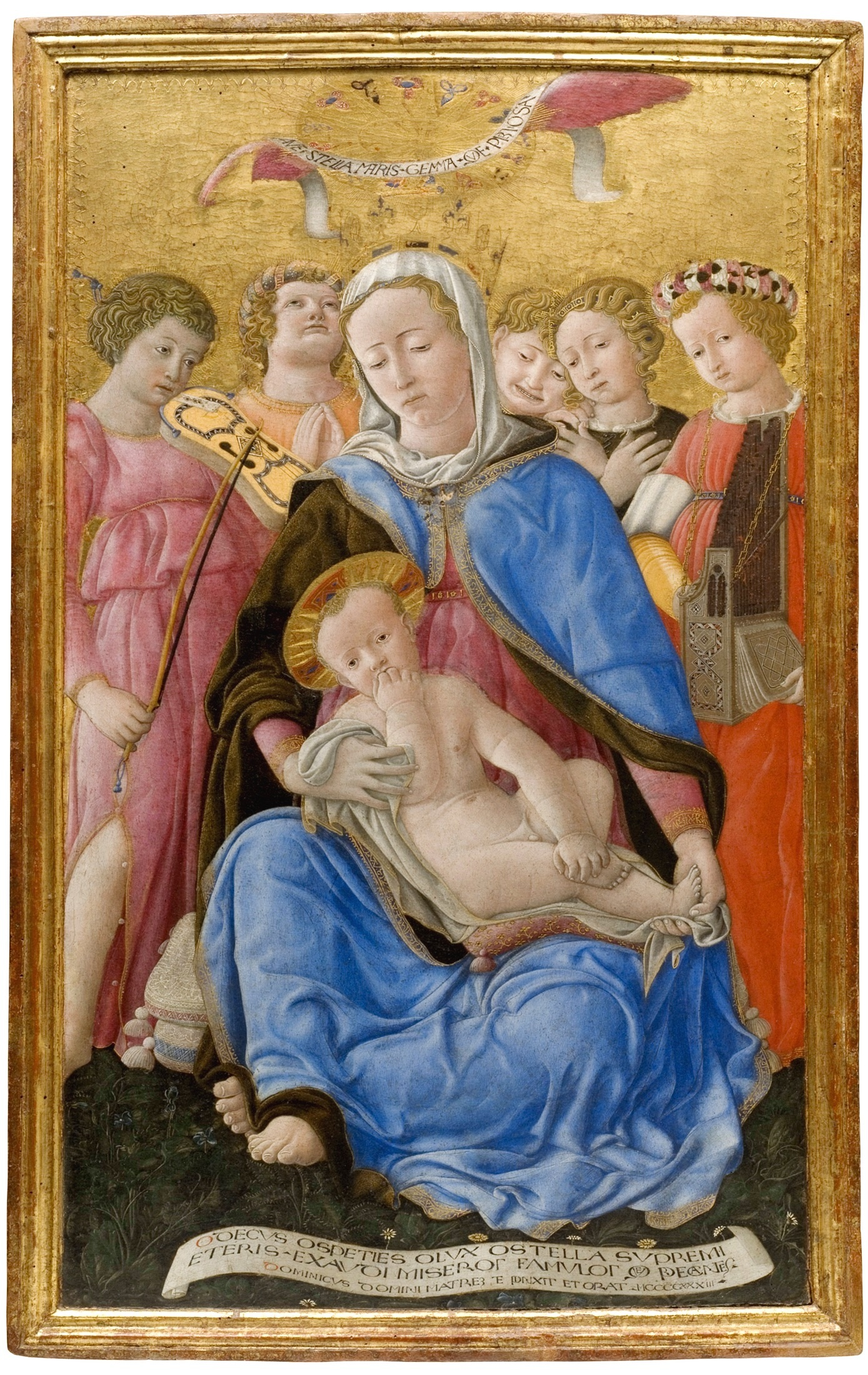
This Madonna of humility by Domenico di Bartolo expresses the symbolic duality of an earthly woman with humility, as well as a heavenly queen.

Catholic texts view humility as annexed to the cardinal virtue of temperance. It is viewed as a potential part of temperance because temperance includes those virtues that restrain or express the inordinate movements of our desires or appetites.

Bernard of Clairvaux defines it as "a virtue by which a man knowing himself as he truly is, abases himself. Jesus Christ is the ultimate definition of Humility."

Saint Augustine stresses the importance of humility in the study of the Bible, with the exemplars of a barbarian Christian slave, the apostle Paul, and the Ethiopian eunuch in Acts 8. Both learner and teacher need to be humble, because they learn and teach what ultimately belongs to God. Humility is a basic disposition of the interpreter of the Bible. The confidence of the exegete and preacher arises from the conviction that their mind depends on God absolutely. Augustine argues that the interpreter of the Bible should proceed with humility, because only a humble person can grasp the truth of Scripture.

Humility was a virtue extolled by Francis of Assisi, and this form of Franciscan piety led to the artistic development of the Madonna of humility first used by the Franciscans for contemplation. The Virgin of humility sits on the ground, or upon a low cushion, unlike the Enthroned Madonna representations. This style of painting spread quickly through Italy, and, by 1375, examples began to appear in Spain, France, and Germany. It became the most popular among the styles of the early Trecento artistic period.

Thomas Aquinas, a 13th-century philosopher and theologian in the Scholastic tradition, says, "The virtue of humility... consists in keeping oneself within one's own bounds, not reaching out to things above one, but submitting to one's superior".

==== Islam ====
In the Qur'an, various Arabic words conveying the meaning of humility are used. The very term "Islam" can be interpreted as "surrender (to God), humility", from the triconsonantal root S-L-M; other words used are tawadu and khushu:

And the servants of (Allah) Most Gracious are those who walk on the earth in humility, and when the ignorant address them, they say, "Peace!"

— Quran 25:63 ^{-Yusuf Ali}

Successful indeed are the believers: those who humble themselves in prayer

— Quran 23:1-2

"The loftiest in status are those who do not know their own status, and the most virtuous of them are those who do not know their own virtue."

— Imam ash-Shafi'i

"Your humbleness humbles others and your modesty brings out the modesty of others."

— Abdulbary Yahya

=== Jainism ===
In Jainism, humility, generally referred to as "Vinay" (pronounced as /ˈvɪneɪ/), is a supreme virtue which is essential for eliminating ego (pride) and attaining spiritual liberation (moksh). In Jainism, humility is expressed through the virtues Mārdava (modesty, absence of pride) and Vinay (reverence, respectful conduct). It is regarded as a fundamental ethical quality necessary for spiritual advancement and liberation. Jain teachings describe humility (Vinay) as essential for spiritual growth, comparing it to the low position of the sea that enables all rivers to flow into it, symbolizing the strength that comes from lowering one's ego. It is described as a discipline that cultivates humbleness toward everyone, helping one overcome ego and anger.

Jain philosophy classifies Mārdava as one of the daśa-dharma (ten universal virtues). It is defined as the absence of arrogance stemming from birth, learning, austerity, wealth, or status. Humility functions as the antidote to māna (pride), one of the principal passions that obstruct the soul's purification. It is regarded as indispensable for the cultivation of right faith, right knowledge, and right conduct, the three pillars of the Jain path to liberation.

The Tattvārtha Sūtra explicitly lists Mārdava among the highest virtues and describes it as a key ethical disposition required for the purification of conduct. Traditional commentaries explain that humility allows one to accept discipline, avoid deceit, and maintain inner calm. The Uttarādhyayana Sūtra emphasizes Vinay (reverence/humility) as a core element of monastic and lay conduct, stressing respectful behaviour toward teachers, elders, and all living beings. Humility in this text is associated with restraint of speech, gentleness, and modest interpersonal conduct.

In Jainism, humility is encouraged to be practiced through modest speech, gentleness, honesty, and avoidance of self-praise. The belief that all souls are equally capable of liberation encourages Jains to avoid hierarchical pride and to treat all beings with respect. For monastics, humility is prescribed through behavioral rules concerning learning, speech, posture, and interactions, while laypersons cultivate humility in social relations and religious observances.

=== Buddhism ===
Buddhism is a religion of "self"-examination. The natural aim of the Buddhist life is the state of enlightenment, gradually cultivated through meditation and other spiritual practices. Humility, in this context, is a characteristic that is both an essential part of the spiritual practice and a result of it. As a quality to be developed, it is deeply connected with the practice of Four Abodes (Brahmavihara): love-kindness, compassion, empathetic joy, and equanimity. As a result of the practice, this cultivated humility is expanded by the wisdom acquired by the experience of ultimate emptiness (śūnyatā) and non-self (anatta). Humility, compassion, and wisdom are intrinsic parts of the state of enlightenment. On the other hand, not being humble is an obstacle on the path of enlightenment which needs to be overcome. In the Tipitaka (the Buddhist scriptures), criticizing others and praising oneself is considered a vice; but criticizing oneself and praising others is considered a virtue. Attachment to the self, apart from being a vice in itself, also leads to other evil states that create suffering.

In the Tipitaka, in the widely known Mangala Sutta, humility (nivato, literally: "without air") is mentioned as one of the thirty-eight blessings in life. In the Pāli Canon, examples of humility include the monk Sariputta Thera, a leading disciple of the Buddha, and Hatthaka, a leading lay disciple.

Once, the Buddha mentioned to some monks that his lay disciple Hatthaka had seven wonderful and marvelous qualities; these being faith, virtue, propriety, self-respect, learning, generosity and wisdom. Later, when Hatthaka learned how the Buddha had praised him he commented: 'I hope there were no laypeople around at the time'. When this comment was reported back to the Buddha, he remarked: "Good! Very good! He is genuinely modest and does not want his good qualities to be known to others. So you can truly say that Hatthaka is adorned with this eighth wonderful and marvelous quality 'modesty'." (A.IV,218)

In Buddhist practice, humility is practiced in a variety of ways. Japanese Soto Zen monks bow and chant in honour of their robes before they don them. This serves to remind them of the connection of the monk's robes with enlightenment. Buddhist monks in all traditions are dependent on the generosity of laypeople, through whom they receive their necessities which is in itself is a practice of humility.

=== Hinduism ===
In Sanskrit literature, the virtue of humility is explained with many terms, some of which use the root word, नति (neti). Sanskrit: नति comes from Sanskrit: न ति, lit. 'No "Me" / I am not'. Related words include विनति (viniti), संनति (samniti, humility towards), and the concept amanitvam, listed as the first virtue in the Bhagavad Gita. Amanitvam is a fusion word for "pridelessness" and the virtue of "humility". Another related concept is namrata (नम्रता), which means modest and humble behaviour.

Different scholars have varying interpretations of amanitvam, humility, as a virtue in the Bhagavad Gita. For example, Prabhupada explains humility to mean one should not be anxious to have the satisfaction of being honoured by others.

Tanya Jopson explains amanitvam, humility, as lack of arrogance and pride, and one of twenty-six virtues in a human being that if perfected, leads one to a divine state of living and the ultimate truth.

Eknath Easwaran writes that the Gita's subject is "the war within, the struggle for self-mastery that every human being must wage if he or she is to emerge from life victorious", and "The language of battle is often found in the scriptures, for it conveys the strenuous, long, drawn-out campaign we must wage to free ourselves from the tyranny of the ego, the cause of all our suffering and sorrow". To get in touch with your true self, whether you call that God, Brahman, etc., you have to let go of the ego. The Sanskrit word Ahamkara literally translates into The-sound-of-I, or quite simply the sense of the self or ego.

Mahatma Gandhi interprets the concept of humility in Hinduism much more broadly, where humility is an essential virtue that must exist in a person for other virtues to emerge. To Mahatma Gandhi, Truth can be cultivated, as well as Love, but Humility cannot be cultivated. Humility has to be one of the starting points. He states, "Humility cannot be an observance by itself. For it does not lend itself to being practiced. It is however an indispensable test of ahimsa (non-violence)." Humility must not be confused with mere manners; a man may prostrate himself before another, but if his heart is full of bitterness for the other, it is not humility. Sincere humility is how one feels inside, it's a state of mind. A humble person is not himself conscious of his humility, says Gandhi.

Swami Vivekananda, a 19th century scholar of Hinduism, argues that the concept of humility does not mean "crawling on all fours and calling oneself a sinner". In Vivekananda's Hinduism, each human being is the Universal, recognizing and feeling oneness with everyone and everything else in the universe, without inferiority or superiority or any other bias, is the mark of humility. To Dr. S Radhakrishnan, humility in Hinduism is the non-judgmental state of mind when we are best able to learn, contemplate and understand everyone and everything else.

=== Sikhism ===
- Make contentment your ear-rings, humility your begging bowl, and meditation the ashes you apply to your body.
- Listening and believing with love and humility in your mind.
- In the realm of humility, the Word is Beauty.
- Modesty, humility and intuitive understanding are my mother-in-law and father-in-law.

— Sayings of Guru Granth Sahib, Guru Nanak, First Guru Of Sikhism

Neecha Andar Neech Jaat Neechi Hu At Neech Nanak Tin Kai Sang Saath Vadian Sio Kia Rees.

— Sri Guru Granth Sahib
Translation:

Nanak is the companion of the lowest of the low and of the condemned lot. He has nothing in common with the high born

Baba Nand Singh Ji Maharaj said about Guru Nanak that Garibi, Nimrata, Humility is the Divine Flavour, the most wonderful fragrance of the Lotus Feet of Lord Guru Nanak. There is no place for Ego (referred to in Sikhism as Haumain) in the sphere of Divine Love, in the sphere of true Prema Bhagti. That is why in the House of Guru Nanak one finds Garibi, Nimrata, Humility reigning supreme.

According to Sikhism, all people equally have to bow before God so there ought to be no hierarchies among or between people. According to Nanak the supreme purpose of human life is to reconnect with Akal (The Timeless One), however, egotism is the biggest barrier in doing this. Using the guru's teaching remembrance of nām (the divine Word) leads to the end of egotism. The immediate fruit of humility is intuitive peace and pleasure. With humility one continues to meditate on the Lord, the treasure of excellence. The God-conscious being is steeped in humility; one whose heart is mercifully blessed with abiding humility. Sikhism treats humility as a begging bowl before the god.

Sikhs extend this belief in equality, and thus humility, towards all faith: "All religious traditions are equally valid and capable of enlightening their followers".

Baba Nand Singh Sahib is renowned as the most humble Sikh Saint in the history of Sikhism.

He who is the Highest is the Lowest. Highest in the Lowest is the Real Highest.

— Baba Narinder Singh Ji

=== Meher Baba ===
The spiritual teacher Meher Baba held that humility is one of the foundations of devotional life: "Upon the altar of humility we must offer our prayers to God." Baba also described the power of humility to overcome hostility: "True humility is strength, not weakness. It disarms antagonism and ultimately conquers it." Finally, Baba emphasized the importance of being humble when serving others: "One of the most difficult things to learn is to render service without bossing, without making a fuss about it and without any consciousness of high and low. In the world of spirituality, humility counts at least as much as utility."

=== Taoism ===
Here are my three treasures.
Guard and keep them!
The first is pity; the second, frugality; the third, refusal to be "foremost of all things under heaven".
For only he that pities is truly able to be brave;
Only he that is frugal is able to be profuse.
Only he that refuses to be foremost of all things
Is truly able to become chief of all Ministers.
At present your bravery is not based on pity, nor your profusion on frugality, nor your vanguard on your rear; and this is death.

— Tao Te Ching

Humility, in Taoism, is defined as a refusal to assert authority or a refusal to be first in anything. The act of daring, in itself, is a refusal of wisdom and a rush to enjoin circumstances before you are ready. Along with compassion and frugality, humility is one of the three treasures (virtues) in the possession of those who follow the Tao.

The treasure of humility, in Chinese is a six-character phrase instead of a single word: Chinese: 不敢為天下先; pinyin: Bugan wei tianxia xian "not dare to be first/ahead in the world". Ellen Chen notes that:

The third treasure, daring not be at the world's front, is the Taoist way to avoid premature death. To be at the world's front is to expose oneself, to render oneself vulnerable to the world's destructive forces, while to remain behind and to be humble is to allow oneself time to fully ripen and bear fruit. This is a treasure whose secret spring is the fear of losing one's life before one's time. This fear of death, out of a love for life, is indeed the key to Taoist wisdom.

Furthermore, also according to the Tao Te Ching, a wise person acts without claiming the results as his. He achieves his merit and does not rests (arrogantly) in it. He does not wish to display his superiority.

=== Greek mythology ===
In Greek mythology, Aidos, the goddess of shyness, shame, and humility, represented the quality that restrained human beings from wrong.

=== Wicca ===
In the numerous traditions of initiatory Wicca, called in the U.S.A. "British Traditional Wicca", humility is one of the four paired & balanced qualities recommended in liturgical texts as having come from the Wiccan Goddess:

...let there be beauty and strength, power and compassion, honor and humility, mirth and reverence within you.

— Doreen Valiente, The Charge of the Goddess, prose version

In the matter of humility, this deific instruction appropriately pairs being honorable with being humble. Characteristically, this Wiccan "virtue" is balanced by its partner virtue.

== Philosophical views of humility ==
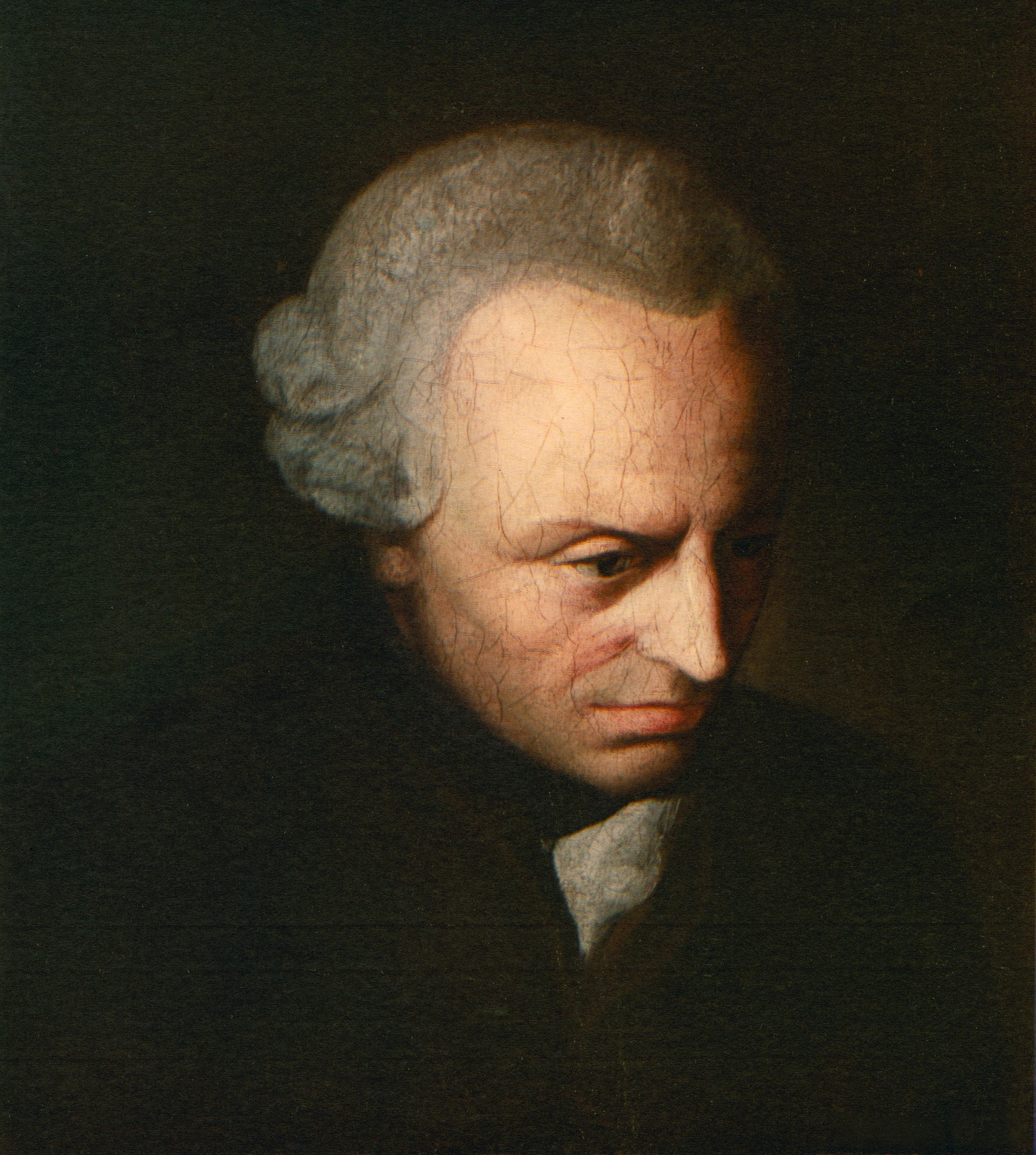
Immanuel Kant

Immanuel Kant's view of humility has been defined as "that meta-attitude that constitutes the moral agent's proper perspective on himself as a dependent and corrupt but capable and dignified rational agent". Kant's notion of humility relies on the centrality of truth and rational thought leading to proper perspective and his notion can therefore be seen as emergent.

Mahatma Gandhi said that an attempt to sustain truth without humility is doomed to become an "arrogant caricature" of truth.

In contemporary philosophy, the philosophers Julia Driver and George Schueler offer distinct views on humility. Driver argues that humility is possessed by one who either underestimates or lacks belief about one's merits, while Schueler believes that humility requires indifference with regard to one's accomplishments.

While many religions and philosophers view humility as a virtue, some have been critical of it, seeing it as opposed to individualism.

"No doubt, when modesty was made a virtue, it was a very advantageous thing for the fools," wrote Arthur Schopenhauer, "for everybody is expected to speak of himself as if he were one".

Friedrich Nietzsche viewed humility as a strategy used by the weak to avoid being destroyed by the strong. In Twilight of the Idols he wrote: "When stepped on, a worm doubles up. That is clever. In that way he lessens the probability of being stepped on again. In the language of morality: humility." He believed that his idealized Übermensch would be more apt to roam unfettered by pretensions of humility, proud of his stature and power, but not reveling idly in it, and certainly not displaying hubris. But, if so, this would mean the pretension aspect of this kind of humility is more akin to obsequiousness and to other kinds of pretentious humility.

== Humility and leadership ==
Research suggests that humility is a trait of effective leadership. For example, a Harvard Business article by J. Collins indicates that certain types of leaders, termed "level 5", possess humility and "fierce resolve". The research suggests that humility is a broad concept that includes self-understanding, awareness, openness, and perspective-taking.

== See also ==
- Aidos – Theme in Ancient Greek literature
- Cultural humility – Self-humility, especially in healthcare
- Epistemic humility – Philosophical view of scientific observation
- False humility – Insincere or strategic display of modesty
- Humiliation – Abasement of pride
- Humility theology – American philanthropic organization
- Intellectual humility – Recognition of the limits of your knowledge and awareness of your fallibility
- Madonna of humility – Artistic subject
- Moral character – Steady moral qualities in people
- Pharisee and the Publican – Parable taught by Jesus of Nazareth according to the Christian Gospel of Luke
