= Jan van Blitterswyck =

Carthusian writer

Jan van Blitterswyck (died 1661) was a Carthusian writer and translator in the Spanish Netherlands.

Blitterswyck was born in Brussels and on 22 January 1606 he was professed in the Brussels Charterhouse. From 1620 to 1634 he was sacristan of the monastery, and from 1637 to 1658 procurator of the Carthusian convent in Bruges. He died in the Brussels Charterhouse on 28 July 1661.

== Writings ==
- Ghebeden ten gebruike der persoonen die de L. Vrouwen beelden bezoeken, te Brussel bestaende (Brussels, Govaerdt Schoevaerts, 1623)
- Gheestelicke zuchten tot Godt (Bruges, Guilliame de Neve, 1629)
- Schat van ghebeden tot O.L. Vrouwe, voor en na de biechte (Bruges, Nicolaes Breyghel, 1641)
- Precationes et Litaniae selectae ad Beatam Virginem Mariam (Brussels, Govaerdt Schoevaerdts, n.d.)

== Translations ==
- Didacus a Stella, OFM, Van des wereldts ijdelheden te versmaden (Brussels, Jan Reyns; Antwerp, Hieronymus Verdussen, 1614)
- Robert Bellarmine, SJ, De Seven Woorden van Christo aen het Cruys gesproken (Antwerp, Cornelis Verschueren, 1619)
- Bartholomaeus Saluthius, OFM, Het licht der sielen (Antwerp, Cornelis Verschueren, 1619)
- Bartholomaeus Saluthius, OFM, De seven trompetten: blaesende door de geheele werelt om den sondaer te verwercken tot penitentie (Ghent, Cornelius Meyer, 1620)
- Bartholomaeus Saluthius, OFM, Het vierde deel van't licht der zielen (Antwerp, Geeraerdt Wolsschaten, 1621)
- Bartholomaeus Saluthius, OFM, Het broederschap der Goddelijcker Liefden (Brussels, Jan Mommaert, 1621)
- Cornelius Lancilottus, OESA, D'Leven van den H. Vader S. Augustijn (Antwerp, Hieronymus Verdussen, 1621)
- Bartholomaeus Saluthius, OFM, Convivium Spirituale amatorum Christi (Brussels, Jan Pepermans, 1622)
- Lawrence Bénard, OSB, Middelen om gheestelijcke herten te helpen oeffenen de deuchden welcke den H. Vader Benedictus in synen reghel leert (Brussels, Govaerdt Schoevaerts, 1624)
- Denis the Carthusian, De laudabili vita conjugatorum (Brussels, Govaerdt Schoevaerdts, 1624)
- Andres de Soto, OFM, Beschouwinghen op het kruycifix ende op de smerten welcke de heylighste Maghet Maria lede aen den voedt des Kruys (Brussels, Jan Pepermans, 1625)
- Denis the Carthusian, Boeck van den enghen wech der Saligheyt (Brussels, Govaerdt Schoevaerdts, 1626)
- Denis the Carthusian, Den spieghel der liefhebbers des werelts (Brussels, Govaerdt Schoevaerdts, 1626)
- Denis the Carthusian, Van de IV uytersten (Brussels, Govaerdt Schoevaerdts, 1627)
- Antonio Daça, OFM, Historie, leven, ende Mirakelen ontgheestinghen, ende openbaeringhen van de Salighe Maghet suster Joanna de la Croix van de derde Ordre van S. Franciscus (Brussels, Jan Mommaert, 1627)
- Denis the Carthusian, De enormitate peccati (Brussels, Govaerdt Schoevaerdts, 1629)
- Philip François, OSB, Daeghelijcksche oeffeninghen der novitien ghetrocken wt den reghel van S. Benedictus (Brussels, Govaerdt Schoevaerdts, 1630)
- Thomas á Jesu, O.Carm., Modus cognoscendi profectum animae spiritualem (Brussels, Govaerdt Schoevaerdts, 1644)
- Antonio de Molina, O.Cart., Documenta spiritualia pro exercitiis quotidianis (Brussels, Govaerdt Schoevaerdts, 1651)
- Thomas Leonardi, OP, Christus Crucifixus (Bruges, Alexander Michiels, 1652)
- Mark de Bonnyers, SJ, Advocatus sive Patronus animarum existentium in purgatorio (Bruges, Lucas vanden Kerchove, 1655)
- Charles de Visch, O.Cist., Het leven van den Eerw. Heere ende Vader in Christo, Heer Adrianus Cancellier in voorleden tijden den XXXIX. Abt van het Loffelyck Klooster ten Duynen (Bruges, Lucas vanden Kerchove, 1657), a biography of Adrianus Cancellier
- Antonio de Molina, O.Cart., Van 't gebed (Brussels, 1660)
- Johannes Justus Lanspergius, O.Cart., Sendtbrief van Onsen Heere Jesus-Christus tot eene Godtminnende ende devote ziele (Brussels, Philip Vleugaert, 1660)
