= Independent Augustinian communities =

Independent Augustinian communities are Roman Catholic religious communities that follow the Augustinian Rule, but are not under the jurisdiction of the Prior General of the Augustinian hermits in Rome.

They include the Canons Regular of Saint Augustine, the Augustinian Recollects, the Discalced Augustinian, and others. There is a spiritual link, through the common Augustinian Rule with The Alexian Brothers (located in the US, Europe, England, Ireland the Philippines and India), the Sisters of Charity of the Incarnate Word (who established the University of the Incarnate Word in Texas), and the Sisters of St. Joan of Arc (in Quebec, United States, and Rome), and the Brothers Hospitallers of St John of God.

== Other branches ==
The two reform congregations are distinct orders in their own right.

=== Order of Discalced Augustinians ===
An offshoot from the hermit friars resulting from reform efforts. These "barefoot" Augustinians are called "discalced" because they wear sandals rather than shoes. They were founded about 1560 by Thomas a Jesu.

=== Order of Augustinian Recollects ===
Founded in Spain in 1592, the Augustinian Recollects are a religious order composed of approximately 1200 religious.

== Canons Regular ==
Most of the congregations of Canons Regular follow the Rule of St/ Augustine.

=== Canons Regular of Saint Augustine ===
Whilst not being a branch of the Augustinian order, the Canons Regular of St. Augustine, who have been known in English as the "Black Canons," or the "Austin Canons," constitute one of the oldest and most prestigious Latin Rite orders. This ancient order is made up of nine independent congregations confederated internationally in 1959, and the Confederation of Canons Regular of St Augustine elects an Abbot Primate.

==== Canons Regular of the Immaculate Conception ====
The Canons Regular of the Immaculate Conception, founded in France in 1871, belong to the Confederation of the Canons Regular of St. Augustine.

=== Order of Canons Regular of Prémontré ===
This order of Canons Regular (also known as "Norbertines") follows the Rule of St. Augustine, and were founded by Norbert of Xanten in 1120. At the end of the 20th century, there were more than one hundred Premonstratensian monasteries worldwide and over 1,500 canons, brothers, deacons, nuns and sisters.

== Other congregations following the Rule of St. Augustine ==
Canon 13 of the Fourth Council of the Lateran directed those who wished to found a new religious community to choose an existing approved rule.

=== Brothers Hospitallers of St John of God ===
Not an historical offshoot, but following the Augustinian Rule, this institute was founded by the Portuguese Saint John of God in Spain during the 16th century. They conduct 231 health care and social welfare services throughout the world and are the official health care providers to the Pope.

=== Augustinians of the Assumption ===
The Assumptionists are a religious congregation of pontifical right, founded in France around 1845 by Emmanuel d'Alzon. The priests and brothers are active in teaching, communications, and mission work.

== The Dominican friars ==
When Saint Dominic obtained approval for his new Order of Preachers, he was directed to adopt an already existing rule. As a cathedral canon, he chose the Rule of St. Augustine. "He supplemented rule with legislation and customs borrowed from the Premonstratensians." He also drew some monastic observances from Benedictine tradition. While the Dominicans follow an adapted Augustinian rule, they are a separate and distinct religious order that counts Augustine as one of its patrons.

== See also ==
- Bridgittines
- Holy Trinity Priory
- The Congregation of the Servants of Christ at Saint Augustine's House
