= Ons Geestelijk Erf =

- Discipline: History of religion
- Language: Dutch, English, German, French
- Edited by: Kees Schepers

Publication details
- History: 1927–present
- Publisher: Peeters for the Ruusbroec Institute (Belgium)
- Frequency: Quarterly

Standard abbreviations
- ISO 4: Ons Geest. Erf

Indexing
- ISSN: 0774-2827 (print); 1783-1652 (web)

Links
- Journal homepage

Ons Geestelijk Erf (Dutch for "Our Spiritual Heritage") is a quarterly peer-reviewed journal of research on the history of spirituality in the Low Countries, founded in 1927 by the Jesuit D. A. Stracke. It is currently published by Peeters on behalf of the Ruusbroec Institute of the University of Antwerp. It was originally established under the patronage of the Catholic primates of Belgium and the Netherlands, Jozef-Ernest van Roey, archbishop of Mechelen, and Henricus van de Wetering, archbishop of Utrecht. Titus Brandsma was a member of the founding editorial committee.
