= Johannes de Raey =

Dutch philosopher (1622-1702)

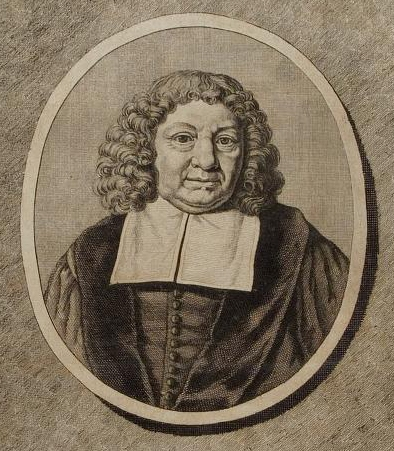
Johannes de Raey

Johannes de Raey (also: Raei) (Wageningen, 1622 – Amsterdam, 1702) was a Dutch philosopher and an early Cartesian.

== Early life and education ==
De Raey was born in 1622 in the Dutch town of Wageningen as son to Jan Jansz van Ray and Hendersken van Lennep. In 1645 he married his cousin Cunera van Lennep. He died in Amsterdam on 30 November 1702. De Raey studied in Utrecht with Henricus Regius and from 1643 at the university of Leiden. He read philosophy with Prof. Adriaan Heereboord and on 16 July 1647 obtained his doctorate in medicine with Adolphus Vorstius. The previous day he had obtained the title of magister artium.

== Career ==
From 1653 to 1668 De Raey was professor of philosophy in Leiden. He made such an excellent name for himself, that the Athenaeum Illustre in 1668 offered him a professorate in Amsterdam. His salary there was 3000 guilders per year, making him the best paid Amsterdam professor of his time.

In Leiden De Raey lectured in medicine as well, and in Amsterdam in physics. As a medical doctor, he was very interested in anatomy. In Amsterdam he became a member of the informal society "Collegium privatum Amstelodamense", of which the members (among whom were Jan Swammerdam and Gerard Blasius) practised the comparative anatomical research of man and animal.

== Philosophy ==
De Raey was a dedicated follower of René Descartes, whom he knew personally, and who called him the best teacher of his doctrines. Yet De Raey did not entirely discount Aristotle, but rather regarded Descartes as the one who completed Aristotle's ideas. Through his lectures and publications De Raey became one of the pioneers of the cartesian doctrine, influencing among others Leibniz. But since in those days Descartes's ideas were too radical for many, De Raey moderated them somewhat and stated that the writings of Descartes were not entirely opposed to aristotelian philosophy.

De Raey felt that philosophy depended wholly on reason, and was detached from sensory perception and taught knowledge. Doubt was the foundation of true philosophy. According to De Raey philosophy had nothing to do with daily life and theology. The importance of De Raey for philosophy lies in the fact that he propagated Descartes's ideas, a.o. by smoothing the edges.

== Publications ==
- “Clavis philosophiae naturalis, seu introductio ad contemplationem naturae Aristotelico-Cartesiana”, Leiden 1654, his most influential work.
- “Disputationes physicae ad problemata Aristotelis”, Leiden 1651-1652.
- “De sapientia veterum”, Amsterdam 1669.
- He edited in Amsterdam in 1668 “Renati Descartes epistolae”, translated by Jan Hendriksz Glazemaker.
