= Jean Puget de la Serre =

French author and dramatist (1594–1665)

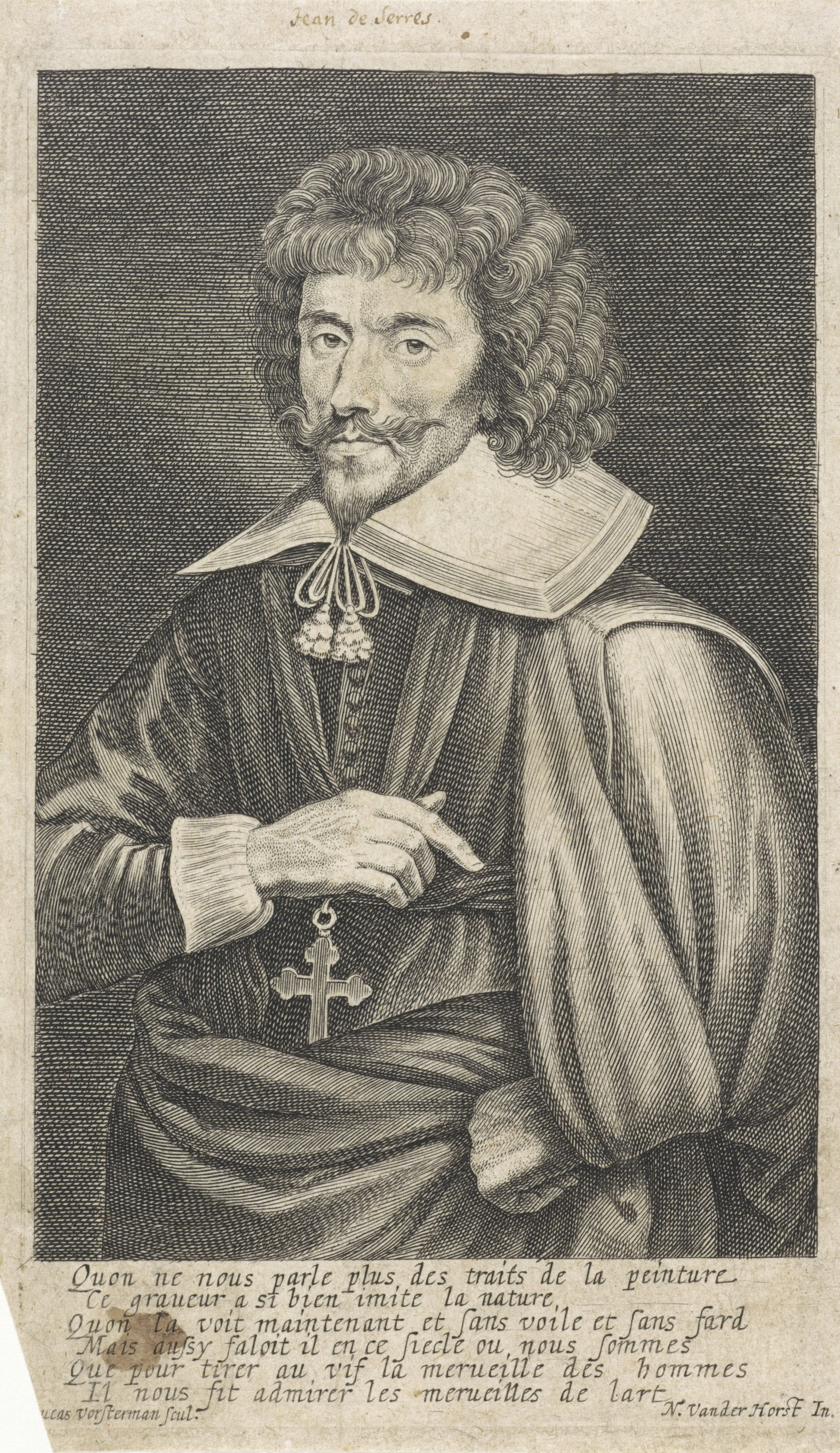
Portrait of Jean Puget de La Serre after Nicolaas van der Horst

Jean Puget de la Serre (15 November 1594 – July 1665) was a French writer and dramatist.

Puget de la Serre was born in Toulouse in late 1594. He was the author of more than a hundred works. He further authored several ballets which were performed in Brussels where he was part of the court of the exiled French Queen Mother, Marie de Medicis, between 1628 and 1635. He also wrote a number of plays.

Puget de la Serre returned to France some time before the death of Marie de Medicis, in 1639 at the latest, and was fortunate enough to be received favourably by King Louis XIII and Cardinal Richelieu, who granted him a pension of 2000 écus. Puget may have owed his good fortune to the influence of his cousin, Pierre Puget de Montauron, a leading financier of the day.

He was appointed librarian in the household of Gaston, Duke of Orléans and in 1647 became almoner to Gaston's daughter, Anne Marie Louise d'Orléans (usually known as la Grande Mademoiselle). He died at Paris in 1665.

== Selected works ==
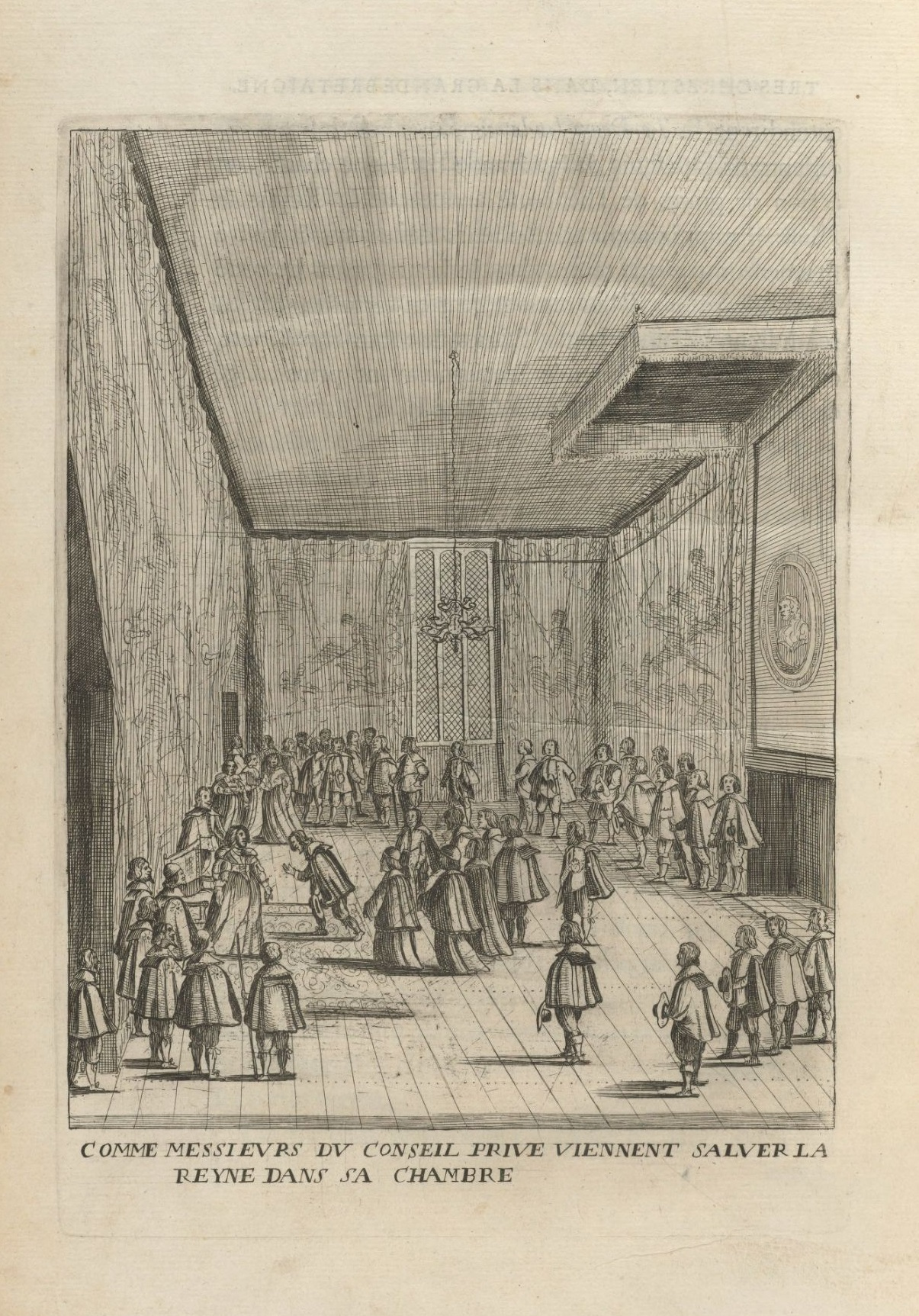
Histoire de l'entree de la reyne mere du roy tres-Chrestien, dans la Grande-Bretaigne, 1639

- Les pensées de l'éternité, Paris, 1628
  - Translated into Dutch by Jacob van der Schuere as Gedachteniße, Der Eeuwigheydt, Amsterdam, 1667
- Le Roman de la cour de Bruxelles, Spa and Aachen, 1628
- Le Tombeau des delices du monde, Brussels, 1630
  - Translated into Dutch by Joan Dullaart as Het Graf der Wereltse Vermakingen (Amsterdam, 1666)
- Le Bréviaire des courtisans, Brussels, 1631
- Le Miroir qui ne flatte point, 1632
  - Translated into English as The Mirrour Which Flatters Not (London, 1639)
  - Translated into Dutch by Jan Hendriksz Glazemaker as De Spiegel, die niet vleyd (Amsterdam, 1667)
- Le Balet des Princes indiens, Brussels, 1634
- Mausolee erigé à la memoire d'Isabelle-Claire-Eugenie (Brussels: Jean Pepermans, 1634) Available on Google Books
- Histoire de l’entree de la reyne mere du roy tres-Chrestien, dans la Grande-Bretaigne, 1639
