= Andres de Soto =

Franciscan preacher

Andres de Soto OFM
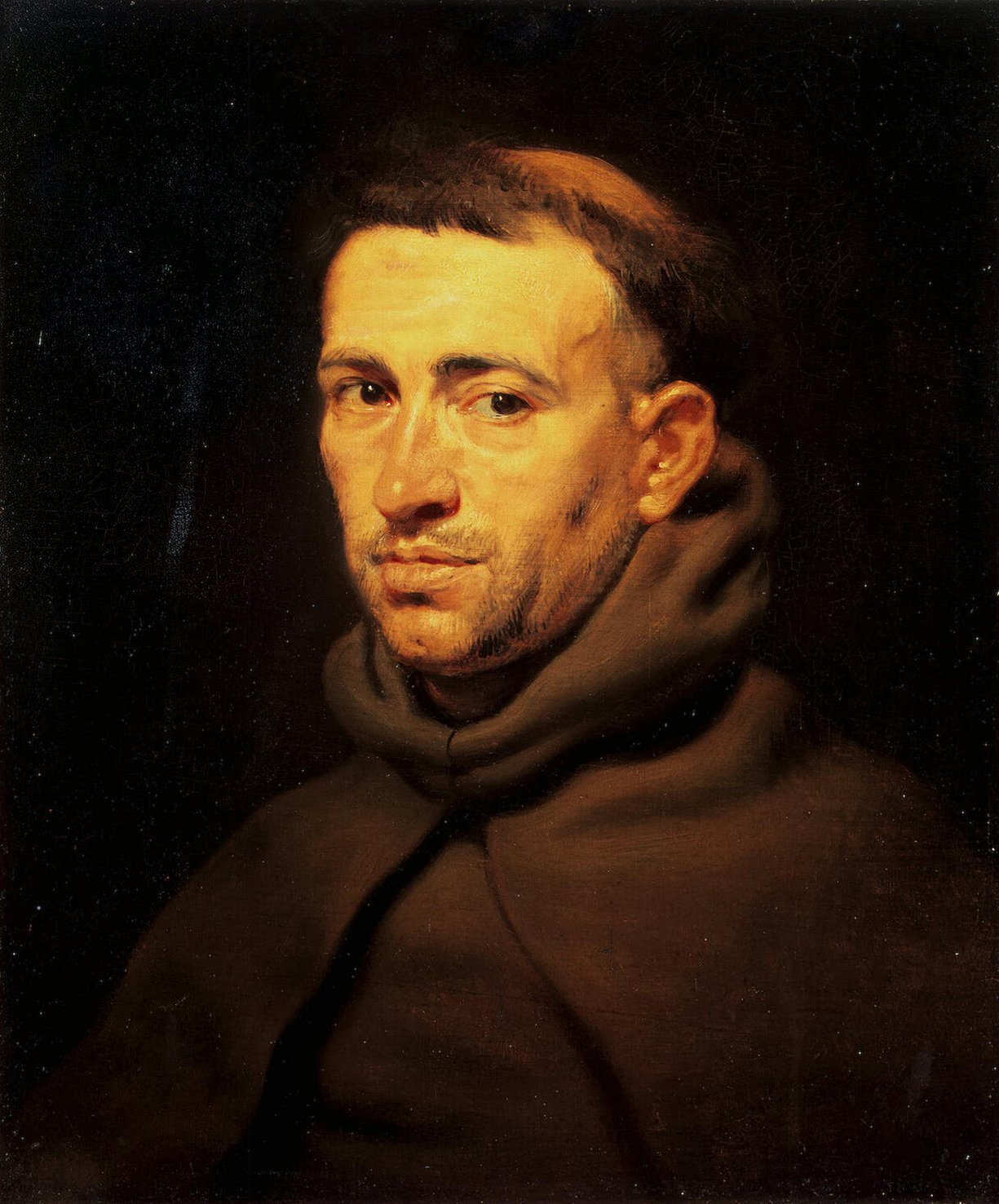
- Born: 1552/3; Sahagún, Crown of Castile, Habsburg Spain
- Died: 5 April 1625; Brussels, Duchy of Brabant, Spanish Netherlands
- Other names: Andreas a Soto
- Religion: Catholic
- Offices held: Confessor to the Infanta Isabella Clara Eugenia

Andres de Soto or Andreas a Soto (1552/3–1625) was a Franciscan preacher and spiritual writer, confessor to the Infanta Isabella Clara Eugenia.

== Life ==
Andres de Soto was born in Sahagún, Spain, in 1552 or 1553.

He entered the Recollect Franciscan Order at the age of 20. In 1599 he was appointed as confessor to the Infanta Isabella and travelled to the Spanish Netherlands. He remained the Infanta's confessor until his death, 26 years later.

In 1603 he was awarded 3,000 livres out of state funds, to be employed in pious works, and a further 713 livres to buy a new hermitage and renovate an existing hermitage in Ghent. In 1604 he helped re-establish the Franciscan Recollect convent in Boetendael, which had been badly damaged and abandoned in 1579. In 1616 he helped found the Annunciate convent in Brussels. In 1622, a year after her husband the Archduke Albert had died, Soto received Isabella's profession as a Franciscan Tertiary.

He died in Brussels on 5 April 1625.

== Works ==
- Libro de la vida y excellencias de el glorioso S. Ioseph, esposo de la Virgen N. Señora (Brussels, Jan Mommaert, 1600). Available on Google Books.
  - Dutch translation by Franciscus Vanden Broecke as Het leven van den heyligen Joseph, bruydegom onser Liever Vrouwen (Brussels, Jan Mommaert, 1614).
- Contemplacion Del Crucifixo, Y Consideraciones De Christo Crucificado, y de los dolores que la Virgen sanctissima padescio al pie de la cruz (Antwerp, Plantin Press, 1601). Available on Google Books. (Reissued in Brussels by Jean Pepermans, 1623. Also available on Google Books.)
  - Dutch translation by Jan van Blitterswyck as Beschouwinghen op het kruycifix ende op de smerten welcke de heylighste Maghet Maria lede aen den voedt des Kruys (Brussels, Jean Pepermans, 1625).
- Redempcion del tiempo cavtivo: en que se declava, quan preciosa cosa es il tiempo, y lo mucho que pierde el que le tiene cautivo, y como se ha de reaimir (Antwerp, Widow and Heirs of Petrus Bellerus, 1606). Available on Google Books.
- Opusculos del origen antiguedad bendicion significacion, virtud, y milagros del agnus dei y del agua bendita (Brussels, Rutger Velpius, 1607). Available on Google Books.
- Sermon que predico el P. F. Andres de Soto en el convento de las Carmelitas descalças de la villa de Brusellas, a la profession de la hermana Theresa de Jesus (Brussels, Jan Mommaert, 1610).
- Vida, milagros y mission a España del glorioso martyr Eugenio, primer arçobispo de la sancta iglesia de Toledo (Brussels, Rutger Velpius & Hubert Antoon, 1612).
- Dos Dialogos en los quales se ensena que cosa sea milagro y porque hizo milagros Christo Nuestro Senor y de que sirven (Brussels, Rutger Velpius & Hubert Antoon, 1612).
  - French translation by Philip Numan as Deux dialogues traitans de la doctrine & matiere des miracles (Brussels, Rutger Velpius, 1613). Available on Google Books.
  - Dutch translation by Philip Numan as Twee t'samensprekingen behandelende de leeringe ende materie vanden mirakelen (Brussels, Rutger Velpius, 1614). Available on Google Books.
- De schole van de eenicheydt des menschs met Godt (Antwerp, Joachim Trognaesius, 1616). Available on Google Books.
