= John of Ruusbroec =

14th-century Brabantian theologian and mystic (1293/4–1381)

Blessed John van Ruysbroeck Can. Reg.
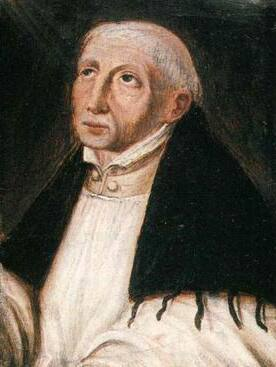
- The blessed John van Ruysbroeck

Doctor Divinus Ecstaticus
- Born: c. 1293–4; Ruisbroek, Duchy of Brabant, Holy Roman Empire
- Died: 2 December 1381 (aged 87–88); Groenendael, Duchy of Brabant, Holy Roman Empire
- Venerated in: Catholic Church
- Beatified: 9 December 1908 by Pope Pius X
- Feast: 2 December
- Attributes: canonical habit

John of Ruusbroec
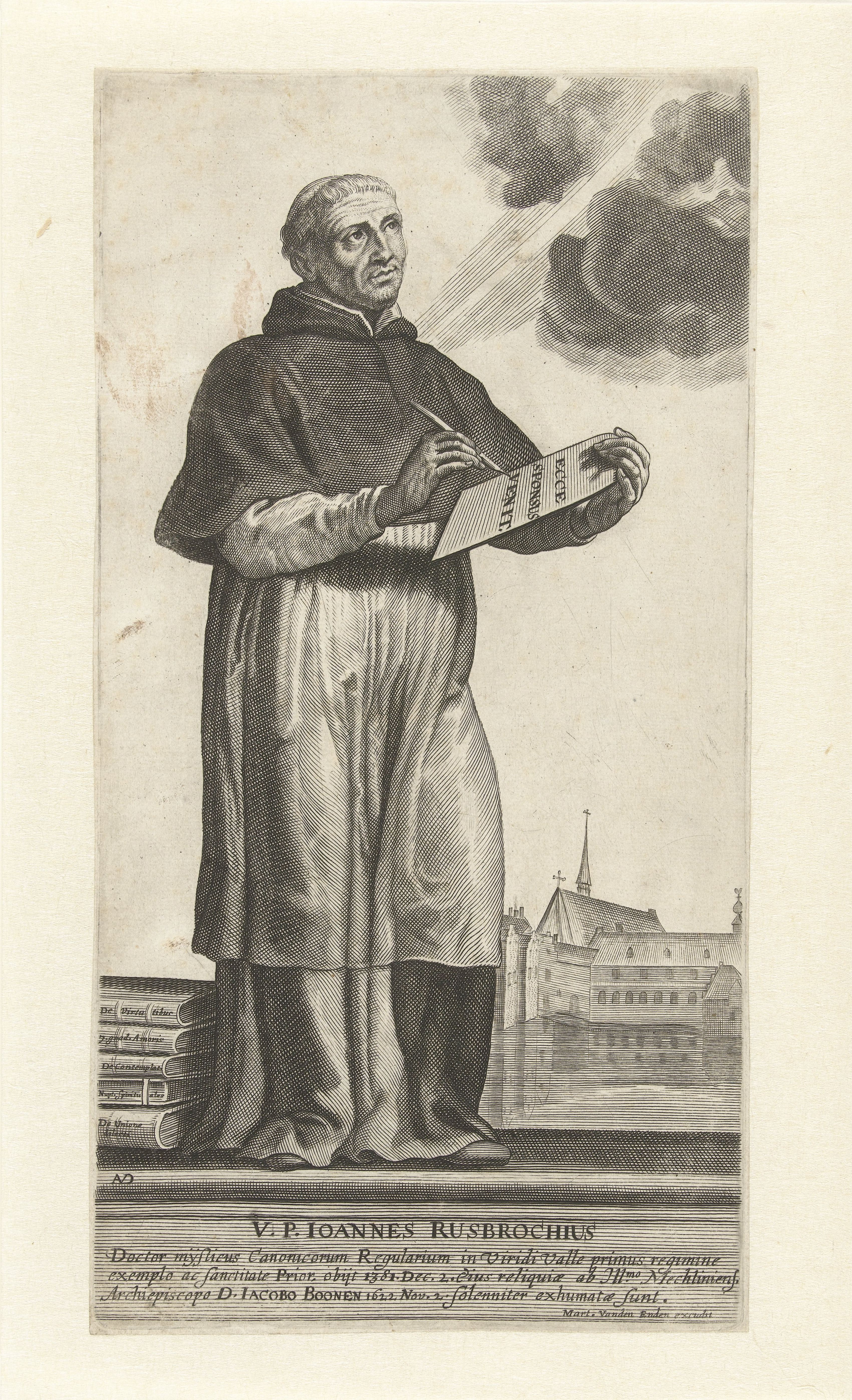
- John of Ruysbroek by Antony van der Does
- Born: Jan van Ruysbroeck

Philosophical work
- Era: medieval philosophy mysticism
- Region: Western philosophy Rheno-Flemish spirituality
- Main interests: Theology, ascetic theology, mystical theology
- Notable works: The Sparkling Stone; The Spiritual Espousals
- Notable ideas: Passion of Christ, ascetism, detachment, humility, charity, Christian universalism

John of Ruusbroec or Jan van Ruusbroec (pronounced [ˈjɑɱ vɑn ˈryzbruk]; 1293/1294 – 2 December 1381), sometimes modernized Ruysbroeck, was an Augustinian canon and one of the most important of the medieval mystics of the Low Countries. Some of his main literary works include The Kingdom of the Divine Lovers, The Twelve Beguines, The Spiritual Espousals, A Mirror of Eternal Blessedness, The Little Book of Enlightenment, and The Sparkling Stone. Some of his letters also survive, as well as several short sayings (recorded by some of his disciples, such as Jan van Leeuwen). He wrote in the Middle Dutch vernacular, the language of the common people of the Low Countries, rather than in Latin, the language of the Catholic Church liturgy and official texts, in order to reach a wider audience.

== Life ==
=== Until his ordination ===
John had a devout mother, who brought him up in the Catholic Church; nothing is known about his father. John's surname, Van Ruusbroec, is not a surname in the modern sense but a toponymic that refers to his native hamlet - modern-day Ruisbroek near Brussels.

At the age of eleven he left his mother, departing without leave or warning, to place himself under the guidance and tuition of his uncle, Jan Hinckaert, a canon regular of St. Gudule's, Brussels. Hinckaert was living according to his Apostolic views with a fellow-canon, Frank van Coudenberg. This uncle provided for Ruysbroeck's education with a view to the priesthood. In due course, Ruysbroeck was presented with a prebend in St. Gudule's, and ordained in 1318. His mother had followed him to Brussels, entered a Béguinage there, and died shortly before his ordination.

=== Priest in Brussels ===
From 1318 until 1343 Ruysbroeck served as a parish priest at St. Gudula. He continued to lead, together with his uncle Hinckaert and Van Coudenberg, a life of extreme austerity and retirement. At that time the Brethren of the Free Spirit were causing controversy in the Netherlands and one of them, a woman named Heilwige Bloemardinne, was particularly active in Brussels, propagating her beliefs chiefly by means of popular pamphlets. Ruysbroeck responded with pamphlets also written in the native tongue (Middle Dutch). Nothing of these treatises remains. The controversy had a permanent effect on Ruysbroeck: his later writings bear constant reference, direct and indirect, to the heretical views expressed in these times, and he always wrote in the country's native language, chiefly with a view to counteract these writings which he viewed as heretical.

=== Priest in Groenendaal ===
The desire for a more retired life, and possibly also the persecution which followed Ruysbroeck's attack on Bloemardinne, induced Ruysbroeck, Jan Hinckaert (d. 1350) and Vrank van Coudenberg (d. 1386) to leave Brussels in 1343 for the hermitage of Groenendaal, in the neighbouring Sonian Forest, which was made over to them by John III, Duke of Brabant. The ruins of the monastery are still present in the forest of Soignes.

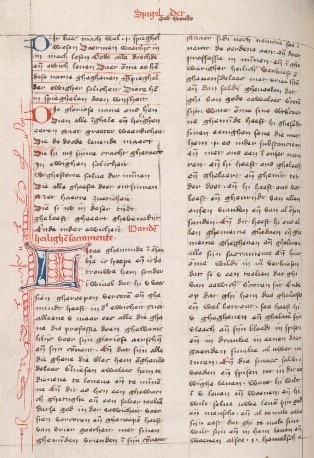
Excerpt from "A Mirror of Eternal Blessedness" of the manuscript "Werken". Composed in Bergen-op-Zoom in 1480. Kept at University Library of Ghent.

Many disciples joined the little company. It was then that it was found expedient to organize into a duly-authorized religious body. The hermitage was erected into a community of canons regular on 13 March 1349, and eventually it became the motherhouse of a congregation, which bore its name of Groenendaal. Francis van Coudenberg was appointed first provost, and John Ruysbroeck prior. Hinckaert refrained from making the canonical profession lest the discipline of the house should suffer from the exemptions required by the infirmities of his old age; he dwelt, therefore, in a cell outside the cloister and there a few years later died.

This period, from his religious profession (1349) to his death (1381), was the most active and fruitful of Ruysbroeck's career. During this time, his fame as a man of God, as a sublime contemplative and a skilled director of souls, spread beyond the bounds of Flanders and Brabant to Holland, Germany, and France. He had relations with the nearby Carthusian house at Herne, and also with several communities of Poor Clare Franciscans. He had connections with the Friends of God in Strasbourg, and in about 1378 he was visited by Geert Groote, the founder of the Devotio Moderna. It is possible, though disputed, that John Tauler came to see him.

John died at Groenendaal, aged 82, on 2 December 1381.

== Works ==
In total, Ruysbroeck wrote twelve books, seven epistles, two hymns and a prayer. All were written in Middle Dutch.

Around 1340, Ruysbroeck wrote his masterpiece, The Spiritual Espousals. The 36 surviving Dutch manuscripts, as well as translations into Latin and Middle High German, are evidence of the book's popularity. Some of the text was also translated into Middle English (via the Latin translation) as The Chastising of God's Children (which was later printed by Wynkyn de Worde). Around the same time, he also wrote a short treatise, The Sparkling Stone, which was also translated into Middle English.

Ruysbroeck's most famous writings were composed during his time in Groenendaal. His longest and most popular work (surviving today in 42 manuscripts), The Spiritual Tabernacle, was begun in Brussels but finished at Groenendaal, presumably early on in his time there. Two brief works, The Christian Faith (an explanation of the Creed) and a treatise on The Four Temptations, also date from around the time of Ruysbroeck's arrival in Groenendaal. His later works include four writings to Margareta van Meerbeke, a Franciscan nun of Brussels. These are The Seven Enclosures (ca. 1346-50), the first of his seven surviving letters, The Seven Rungs (ca. 1359-60), and A Mirror of Eternal Blessedness.

About 1363 the Carthusians at Herne dispatched a deputation to Groenendaal presenting Ruysbroeck with questions on his first book, The Realm of Lovers. Ruysbroeck went to Herne to clarify his teaching, and afterwards put this in writing in his work The Little Book of Enlightenment.

== Thought ==
The treatise The Seven Steps of the Ladder of Spiritual Love is the one that is currently most-readily available. Of the various treatises preserved, the best-known and the most characteristic is that entitled The Spiritual Espousals. It is divided into three books, treating respectively of the active, the interior, and the contemplative life.

Ruysbroeck wrote as the spirit moved him. He loved to wander and meditate in the solitude of the forest adjoining the cloister; he was accustomed to carry a tablet with him, and on this to jot down his thoughts as he felt inspired so to do. Late in life he declared that he had never committed aught to writing save by the motion of the Holy Ghost.

None of his treatises give anything like a complete or detailed account of his system; perhaps it would be correct to say that he himself was not conscious of elaborating any system. In his dogmatic writings he explains, illustrates, and enforces traditional teachings with remarkable force and lucidity. In his ascetic works, his favourite virtues are detachment, humility and charity; he loves to dwell on such themes as flight from the world, meditation upon the life of Christ, especially the passion, abandonment to the Divine Will, and an intense personal love of God.

In common with most of the German mystics, Ruysbroeck starts from divine matters before describing humanity. His work often then returns to discussing God, showing how the divine and the human are so closely united as to become one. He demonstrates inclinations towards Christian universalism in writing that "Man, having proceeded from God is destined to return, and become one with Him again." But here he is careful to clarify his position: "There where I assert that we are one in God, I must be understood in this sense that we are one in love, not in essence and nature." Despite this declaration, however, and other similar saving clauses scattered over his pages, some of Ruysbroeck's expressions are certainly rather unusual and startling. The sublimity of his subject-matter was such that it could scarcely be otherwise. His devoted friend, Geert Groote, a trained theologian, confessed to a feeling of uneasiness over certain of his phrases and passages, and begged him to change or modify them for the sake at least of the weak. Later on, Jean Gerson and then Bossuet both professed to find traces of unconscious pantheism in his works. As an offset, the enthusiastic commendations of his contemporaries should be mentioned. These were by mystics and scholars such as Groote, Johannes Tauler, Thomas à Kempis, John of Schoonhoven, and in subsequent times of the Franciscan Henry van Herp, the Carthusians Denis and Laurentius Surius, the Carmelite Thomas á Jesu, the Benedictine Louis de Blois, and the Jesuit Leonardus Lessius. Ernest Hello and especially Maurice Maeterlinck have done much to make his writings known. Ruysbroeck was a powerful influence in developing United Nations Secretary General Dag Hammarskjöld's conception of spiritual growth through selfless service to humanity, as expressed in his book of contemplations called Vägmärken ('Markings').

Ruysbroeck insisted that the soul finds God in its own depths, and noted three stages of progress in what he called the spiritual ladder of Christian attainment: (1) the active life, (2) the inward life, (3) the contemplative life. He did not teach the fusion of the self in God, but held that at the summit of the ascent the soul still preserves its identity. In the Kingdom of the Lovers of God he explains that those seeking wisdom must "flow forth on the waters to all the boundaries of the earth, that is, on compassion, pity and mercy shown to the needs of all men", must "fly in the air of the Rational faculty" and "refer all actions and virtues to the honour of God"; thence (through grace) they will find an "immense and boundless clearness" bestowed upon their mind. In relation to the contemplative life, he held that three attributes should be acquired: The first is spiritual freedom from worldly desires ("as empty of every outward work as if he did not work at all"), the second is a mind unencumbered with images ("inward silence"), and the third is a feeling of inward union with God ("even as a burning and glowing fire which can never more be quenched"). His works, of which the most important were De vera contemplatione ("On true contemplation") and De septem gradibus amoris ("On the seven steps of love"), were published in 1848 at Hanover; also Reflections from the Mirror of a Mystic (1906) and Die Zierde der geistlichen Hochzeit (1901).

== Veneration and commemoration ==
After Ruysbroeck's death in 1381, his relics were carefully preserved and his memory honoured as that of a saint. After his death, stories called him the Ecstatic Doctor or Divine Doctor, and his views formed a link between the Friends of God and the Brethren of the Common Life, the ideas which may have helped to bring about the Reformation.

When Groenendaal Priory was suppressed by Joseph II in 1783, his relics were transferred to St. Gudule's, Brussels, where, however, they were lost during the French Revolution. Ruysbroeck was beatified on 9 December 1908 by Pope Pius X via cultus confirmation.

No authentic portrait of Ruysbroeck is known to exist; but the traditional picture represents him in the canonical habit, seated in the forest with his writing tablet on his knee, as he was in fact found one day by the brethren—rapt in ecstasy and enveloped in flames, which encircle without consuming the tree under which he is resting.

At the University of Antwerp there is a Ruusbroec Institute for the study of the history of spirituality. There is also a secondary school called Jan-van-Ruusbroeckollege in Laken near the Royal Palace of Belgium.

== Cultural references ==
The epigraph of the 1884 novel À rebours by Joris-Karl Huysmans has the following Ruysbroeck quotation: "I must rejoice beyond the bounds of time... though the world may shudder at my joy, and in its coarseness know not what I mean." In this novel, Huysmans describes Ruysbroeck as "un mystique du xiii^{e} siècle, dont la prose offrait un incompréhensible mais attirant amalgame d’exaltations ténébreuses, d’effusions caressantes, de transports âpres" ("a thirteenth century mystic whose prose presented an incomprehensible but attractive amalgam of gloomy ectasies, tender raptures, and violent rages.")

Ruysbroeck is mentioned in The Razor's Edge, a novel by W. Somerset Maugham. The novel concerns the spiritual path of Laurence Darrell, who mentions to his fiancée early in the novel--as a way of testing whether she had inclinations similar to his-- that Ruysbroek was someone 'he did not know at college' but whom he thought had found some answers to his life questions.

Ruysbroeck's writing on the Life of Union, is the origin of the so-called German mystic Ranulph Maubier mentions when he advises Michelle du Frocq, the oldest of the children in Elizabeth Goudge’s first novel, Island Magic, how to achieve union with the ineffable universe after Michelle has been inspired by John Keats’ poem Ode on a Grecian Urn.

Ruysbroek is also mentioned in Elizabeth Goudge's play, The Brontës of Haworth (in Three Plays, Duckworth, London, 1939).

== See also ==
- List of Latin nicknames of the Middle Ages: Doctors in theology
- Evelyn Underhill's Ruysbroeck
