= Tyāga =

Sanskrit word meaning sacrifice

Tyāga (Sanskrit: त्याग) is a Sanskrit word that means "sacrifice, giving up in generosity, forsaking, resigning" anything of value, as well as "renunciation" depending on the context. It is an ethical concept in Hinduism, Buddhism and Jainism.

== Etymology ==
Tyāga means – sacrifice, renunciation, abandonment, resignation, donation, forsaking, liberality, withdrawal Tyāga which is not merely physical renunciation of the world is different from Sannyasa; Sannyasa which comes from the root as means – "giving up entirely", Tyāga means – "giving up with generosity what one could probably have kept".

== Hinduism ==
Tyāga or abandonment refers to giving up of all anxieties for enjoying the fruits of actions; through practice of this kind of tyāga infusing discipline in daily activities the momentary anxiety to enjoy fruits of actions is overcome. It is a subjective renunciation of selfishness and desire.

Yajna is Tyāga . The Vedic interpretation of renunciation (tyāga ) of the fruits of ritual acts including – agnistomena svargakāmo yajeta – "the desire for heaven", which renunciation is to be found expressed in the phrase – agnaye idam na mama – "this is for Agni, not for me" – pronounced by the yajamana at the time of the oblation.

The Tejobindu Upanishad belonging to Krishna- yajurveda explains that in Tyāga ('renunciation') one abandons the manifestations or objects of the universe through the cognition of Atman that is Sat and Cit and this is practiced by the wise as the giver of immediate salvation. Thus, Kaivalya Upanishad portrays the state of man on the way of renunciation (tyāga) as having become free of all attachment to the worldly and who, consequently knows and feels himself only as the one divine essence that lives in all.

=== Tyaga of Bhagavad Gita ===
Moksha consists in securing lasting freedom from the bondage of existence in the form of birth and death and realizing God who is no other than Bliss (Brahman). Chapter XVIII of the Bhagavad Gita deals with Sannyasa and Tyāga, the Paths of Knowledge and Action that are means to the attainment of moksha. Krishna tells Arjuna that sannyāsa is understood as the giving up of all actions motivated by desires, and tyāga consists in relinquishing the fruit of all actions. There are three kinds of Tyāga – Sattvika, Rajasika and Tamasika (Sloka XVIII.4). Acts of sacrifice, charity and penance (the purifiers of wise men) must be performed without attachment or hope of award. Krishna states - मोहात्तस्य परित्यागस्तामसः (the abandonment of prescribed duty through ignorance) is the Tamasika form of tyāga and is not advisable. And if abandonment is owing to कायक्लेशभयात्तयजेत् (abandonment for fear of physical strain) then it is Rajasika form. If abandonment is –

कार्यमित्येव यत्कर्म नियतं क्रियतेऽर्जुन |
सङंग त्यक्त्वा फलं चैव स त्यागः सात्त्विको मतः| (Sloka XVIII.9)

"A prescribed duty which is performed simply because it has to be performed, giving up attachment and fruit, that alone has been recognized as the Sattvika form of renunciation."

Thereafter, Arjuna is told about the marks of a Sattvika-man of renunciation. Krishna states that no one in possession of a body can give up absolutely all action. Instead, a renunciate is one who abstains from any actions that are prohibited or motivated by desire, and who performs duties and renounces the fruit of actions. No fruits of actions accrue for this kind of renunciate (Sloka XVIII.11-12). In the preceding discourses, Krishna had recommended to Arjuna actions which ought to be performed as duty (Ch.III.19); He told him to perform ordained actions (Ch.III.8), to be free from attachment (Ch.III.9,19 & Ch.II.48), and to have no desire for the fruit of action (Ch.II.47); Krishna had recommended Sattvika-tyāga.

=== Sannyasa and Tyāga ===
Sannyasa literally means – throwing away, absolute rejection, formal monastic life; in the Bhagavad Gita, it means – mental state of thorough-going renunciation, of uncompromising abandonment of all that is unfit and unworthy, of intense dispassion toward things of the world, both internal and external. Tyāga literally means – abandonment, the turning from all that hinders the realization of the Self; in the Bhagavad Gita, it means – renunciation in the sense of relinquishment of the fruit of action. Sannyāsa is external, even though it is based on internal disposition; Tyāga is completely mental, it is a state of thought and attitude. Arjuna is emphatically told that it is possible to act and accrue no karma whatsoever; it is a matter of consciousness.

In this context, Chinmayananda remarks that abandonment is the true content of the status of renunciation – sannyāsa without the tyāga spirit is but an empty show; real abandonment is meant for rising to a nobler status of fulfillment, leading on to the ampler fields of expression, to fuller ways of living and to greater experiences of joy. And, Aurobindo explains that – "Sannysa in the standing of the terminology of the sages means the laying aside of desirable actions. In that sense Tyāga, not Sannyasa, is the better way. It is not the desirable actions that must be laid aside, but the desire that gives them that character has to be put away from us... The spiritual transference of all works to the Master and his Shakti is the real sannyāsa in the teachings of the Gita.... The essence of renunciation, the true Tyāga, the true sannyāsa is not any rule of thumb of inaction but a disinterested soul, a selfless mind, the transition from ego to the free impersonal and spiritual nature. "

Self-discipline too becomes a form of Sattvika-tyāga, during the course of which exercise one has control over negative emotions and behaviours such as anger, greed and pride. The Bhagavad Gita projects action to serve as steps on the path of spiritual ascent, as an effective means to purify the mind through diligently cultivated mental discipline in action; the true fruit of Tyāga is an elevating sense of peace and fulfillment, even if it entails a bit of physical discomfort.

== Jainism ==
According to Tattvartha Sutra, an ascetic’s dharma consists of ten elements i.e. abstract virtues, which are – ksama ('forbearance'), mardava ('humility'), arjava ('uprightness'), sauca ('desirelessness'), satya ('truthfulness'), samyama ('self-discipline'), tapas ('self-mortification'), tyaga ('renunciation'), akincanya ('poverty') and brahmacharya ('celibacy'). Hemachandra has recognized only two of the ten pratyakhyanas viz. sanketa-pratyakhyana and addha-pratyakhyana, the former, which is of eight types, is symbolic and the devotee refrains from taking food for some time by which renunciation he recalls his mind to his religious duties; the latter, is ritualistic, also connected with abstention from or renouncing food, and has a set methodology to adopt. Ahimsa-vrata practiced by the Svetambras refers to the renunciation of killing. Basically, there are five kinds of tyāgas included in the eleven pratimās viz. sacitta-tyāga pratimā, the stage of renouncing uncooked food; ārambha-tyāga pratimā, the stage of abandonment of all professional activity; parigraha-tyāga pratimā, the stage of transferring publicly one’s property to a son or relative; anumati-tyāga pratimā, the stage of leaving the household and refraining from counselling in household matters, and uddista-tyāga pratimā, the stage of not eating food especially prepared for oneself i.e. the stage of seeking alms like a monk, commonly followed by Svetambras , Digambaras and Avasyaka-Curni. Nemicandra gives a list of eighty-four asatanas which includes sacittanām atayāga or failure to remove sentient objects and ajive tyāga or failure to remove non-sentient objects.

== See also ==
- Nekkhamma
- Vairagya
