= Jan van Leeuwen (mystic) =

Jan cooking (foreground) and writing beside his bed (background), from a fragmentary illustrated copy of his works

Jan van Leeuwen (c. 1300–1378) was a lay brother of the Augustinian priory of Groenendaal and a mystical author who wrote over twenty treatises in Dutch. He was a cook and a member of the lowest social class, but his works enjoyed great popularity in his lifetime.

== Life ==
Jan was born into the lowest social class around 1300 or 1310. Nothing is known of his early life, although it has been surmised that he was a blacksmith or perhaps a cook for the duke of Brabant. He entered the hermitage at Groenendaal in 1344, a year after its founding by Jan van Ruusbroec. By his own account, he was illiterate at the time. Ruusbroec served as his confessor and his main theological teacher, whom he praises highly in his writings. He performed manual labour, working mainly as a cook, at Groenendaal for the rest of his life. Jan never became a canon and died in 1378.

Henricus Pomerius (died 1469) included a biography of Jan in his Latin chronicle of Groenendaal, De origine monasterii Viridisvallis. Jan was posthumously known as the "good cook" (bonus cocus). Pomerius records how, during one Martinmas, at the communal meal, Jan broke the rule of silence to sing a hymn in praise of Saint Martin. He was not disciplined, since the brothers recognized him as being in a mystical state.

== Works ==
Jan is the only known Christian mystical writer of his social class. He wrote twenty-two mystical treatises in Middle Dutch. His earliest writings were finished after Groenendaal adopted the Augustinian rule in 1350 but before 1352. He was popular in his own lifetime, with some of his works being edited as early as 1355. A compilation of his complete works was circulating within decades of his death. His somewhat rough and "unsophisticated" writing, however, lacks a modern readership, unlike that of contemporary Rheno-Flemish mystics like Ruusbroec and Hadewijch. His writings have been considered difficult because of their lack of artifice and occasional circularity.

=== Themes ===
Jan van Leeuwen is famous for his criticism of Meister Eckhart. He devoted an entire book to it, Van meester Eckaerts leere daer hi in doelde ("On Meister Eckhart's Doctrine in Which He Goes Astray"). It has generally been held in low regard. He calls Eckhart a "devilish man", an "unbeliever" and a heretic. Jan was familiar with at least one of Eckhart's sermons and with the condemnation of some of Eckhart's ideas in the papal bull Ad nostrum qui. Jan also mentions Eckhart in Van vijfterhande bruederscap ("On the Five Kinds of Brotherhood"), Van den tien gheboden ("On the Ten Commandments") and Van enen sacramenteliken etene ("On a Sacramental Meal"). In Van vijfterhande bruederscap, he backs down from his earlier extreme position, leaving judgement of Eckhart to God. In Van menegherande goeder leeringhen ("Various Good Learnings"), he attacks Beguines, Lollards and Free Spiritists, but does not mention Eckhart. Among the things he criticises as errors are:

(1) ... they find and experience their essential being and simple essence as a primacy and a life of everything. And when these people are able to attain to their source and their first being, they have the impression that their createdness—and moreover all createdness—will perish, the uncreated divine light as well as the created light, and they will become nothing. (2) And furthermore they claim that the divine persons are perishing or will be perishing too. (3) Indeed, even more, they claim that God himself has no will, nor any operation or intellect. (4) And all of this is their saying and thus they have the interior feeling that they will diminish, and that all being will become one divine being of a simple substance. Moreover they think that all other being will be absolved in that essential being and will become nothing.

In Dat achtste boecxken wat dat een armen mensche van gheeste toe behoert ("What Pertains to a Person Poor in Spirit"), Jan does not named Eckhart but opens by rejecting the latter's definition of the poor in spirit as unbiblical. Whereas for Eckhart the poor in spirit want nothing, understand nothing and desire nothing, for Jan "the general active state of life ... pertains to all people" and Christ is likened to an anvil on which Christians must hammer their souls.

Historiated initial of Moses receiving the Ten Commandments from a copy of Dboec vanden x gheboden gods

Jan wrote two texts on the Ten Commandments, Dboec vanden x gheboden gods ("The Book on God's Ten Commandments") and Dboec vanden x gheboden ("The Book on the Ten Commandments"). According to Pomerius, the description of a state of ecstasy followed by a period of hellish trials or mystical dereliction in the latter is in fact autobiographical.

=== Manuscripts ===
Jan's writings were edited by the brothers of Groenendaal before dissemination. A first collection of five of his works was edited in 1355. A second collection of nine—the original five plus four more—appeared towards the end of the century.

The 1355 edition is known only from two manuscripts: Deventer, Stadsarchief en Athenaeumbibliotheek, I, 55, copied at the convent of Diepenveen about 1425 and Pommersfelden, Bibliothek Graf von Schönborn, 280/2881, copied by Peter von Zutphen at the monastery of Rebdorf in 1459. The former contains just one work while the latter, although heavily Germanized, contains all five.

The second edition is known from three copies. The earliest, from about 1400, is Brussels, Koninklijke Bibliotheek, II 138. It is an illuminated manuscript but incomplete. Only six leaves remain and some miniatures in Cape Town, National Library of South Africa, Grey 3 c 4. The earliest complete copy is Brussels, Koninklijke Bibliotheek, IV 401, made around 1460 for Count John IV of Nassau. The last copy, also compelte, was made by Jan de Swettere, a lay brother of the priory of Bethlehem in 1540 (now Brussels, Koninklijke Bibliotheek, 667).

In the years 1543–1547, Jan de Swettere also copied a collection of thirteen additional works that may be the only surviving copy of the second edition's second volume, now Brussels, Koninklijke Bibliotheek, 888–890.

=== List of works ===
The following table presents Jan van Leeuwen's works in the order in which they appeared in the edited collections, with their Dutch and Latin titles and dates of composition.

Title (Dutch)	Title (Latin)	Date
Dboec vanden x gheboden gods	De decem praeceptis	1358
Van vier manieren van bedinghen ende ondersceet tusschen bidden beden ende aenbeden in tghemeyn	De oratione	1371–1374?
Dboec vanden inval	De inspiratione	
Die rolie vander woedegher minnen	De ardenti amore Dei	after 1355
Vanden drien coninghen	De tribus magis	before 1352
Een ander wonderlic bouc van tienderhande materien tracterende	De articulis	1352
Dit boec sal heten een ghetughe ende een ondersceyt ghevende tusschen godlec licht ende deemsterheyt ende oec tusschen natuerleke gheboerte ende overnatuerleke gheboerte	De differentia inter naturalem et supernaturalem generationem	1352–1353
Dit boec sal ons redene ende ondersceyt gheven tusschen die ghene die god gheroepen ende ewelec uutvercoren heeft	De electione divina	between 1353 and 1355
Van vijfterhande bruederschap	De quintuplici confraternitate	before 1355
Dboec vanden x gheboden die god bi moyses den kinderen van isreal gaf	Item scripsit et alium librum de praeceptis decalogi	1355
Dat ander boec vanden seven teekenen der sonnen	De septem signis Zodiaci spiritualiter expositis	1356
Terde boec – Hoe dat goet oerspronct overmids die drijheit gods uut eenre macht	De origine omnium rerum	
Tvierde boec vanden ix choren der inghelen ende der ewegher glorien Ende hoe wi hem gheliken moghen	De novem choris angelorum et cetera	before 1352–1353
Dat vijfste boec van sevenderhande manieren van menschen die gode minnen dwelke gheset es op drije state van levenne	De septem generibus amatorum Dei	
Dat seste boec hoe dat men cristus leere verstaen ende volcomelijc na volghen sal ende dat in drie manieren	De intelligentia et observantia doctrinae Christi	
Dat sevende boec hoe datmen alle ongherechticheit laten sal ende cristus roepe ghetrouwelijc na volghen met allen doechden tot in deweghe leven	De desertione injustitiae et obedientia vocationis Christi	
Dat achtste boecxken wat dat een armen mensche van gheeste toe behoert	De paupertate spiritus	
Dat neghenden boexken van meester eckaerts leere daer hi in doelde	Contra errorem dogmatis magistri Eckardi	before 1355
Dat tiende boec van enen inwendeghen verborghenen gheesteliken sacramenteliken etene daer ons Jhesus Cristus toe noet	De spirituali manducatione corporis Christi	before 1355?
Dat XIste boec van menegherande goeder leeringhen die seer orbelijc sijn	De multiplicibus bonis et salutaribus documentis	
Dat XIIste boec beghinnende op die VIII salicheide	De octo beatitudinibus	
Een rolle vanden richters ende onderscheet tusschen den gherechteghen ende ongherechteghen mensche	De judicibus et cetera	

== Bibliography ==
- Arblaster, John (2021). "Lionizing Jan van Leeuwen (†1378): The 'Good Cook' of Groenendaal in Iconography and Hagiography". Ikon. 14: 141–152.
- Desplenter, Youri (2017). "Morals from a Mystical Cook: Jan van Leeuwen and the Ten Commandments". In Walter Melion; Jürgen Pieters; Youri Desplenter (eds.). The Ten Commandments in Medieval and Early Modern Culture. Brill. pp. 133–151.
- Desplenter, Youri (2023). "Jan van Leeuwen, Johannes Tauler, Their Writings, and Their Connections: The Fourteenth-Century Brabant and Rhinelandic Mystical Traditions as Textual Community". In Cornelis van der Haven; Youri Desplenter; J. A. Parente Jr.; Jan Bloemendal (eds.). Literature without Frontiers: Transnational Perspectives on Premodern Literature in the Low Countries, 1200–1800. Brill. pp. 197–222.
- Kikuchi, Satoshi (2012). "Jan van Leeuwen's Criticism of Meister Eckhart: An Aspect of the Impact from the Papal Bull In agro dominico in Fourteenth-century Brabant". Medieval Mystical Theology. 21 (2): 170–192.
- Kikuchi, Satoshi (2016). "Jan van Leeuwen's Mystical Anthropology: A Testimony of Lay Mysticism from Medieval Brabant". In John Arblaster; Rob Faesen (eds.). Mystical Anthropology: Authors from the Low Countries. Routledge. pp. 105–118.
- McGinn, Bernard (2016). The Varieties of Vernacular Mysticism (1350–1550). Herder & Herder.
- Vandemeulebroucke, Eva; Desplenter, Youri (2016). "How Jan van Leeuwen († 1378) Was Made an Author: Opera Omnia and Authority". In Shari Boodts; Johan Leemans; Brigitte Meijns (eds.). Shaping Authority: How Did a Person Become an Authority in Antiquity, the Middle Ages and the Renaissance?. Brepols. pp. 363–387.
- Van Damme, Yves (2021). "The Inevitable Eckhart: The Critical Reception of Eckhartian Motives in the Work of Jan van Leeuwen". Journal of Medieval Religious Cultures. 47 (1): 74–102.
