= Jan Hendriksz Glazemaker =

Dutch translator

Jan Hendriksz Glazemaker (1619/20–1682) was a Dutch translator of almost 70 books, mostly from Latin and from French. Glazemaker probably lived and worked in Amsterdam, where most of his translations were published. He may have been the first person in history to make a living primarily by translating into Dutch. While much of his output was of the Latin classics, he was particularly noted for his translations of the writings of René Descartes from both French and Latin, and for his translations of Spinoza's works from Latin.

== Works ==
Glazemaker's translations include

- Titus Livy, Romainsche Historien (1646)
- Desiderius Erasmus, Onderwijs tot de ware godgeleertheit (1651)
- Homer, De Iliaden (1654)
- René Descartes, Meditationes de prima philosophia: of bedenkingen van d'eerste wijsbegeerte (1656-1657)
- René Descartes, Redenering om 't beleed, om zijn reden wel te beleiden ende waarheit in de wetenschappen te zoeken (1656)
- René Descartes, Principia philosophiae: of beginselen der wijsbegeerte (1657)
- Mahomets Alkoran (1657) - translated from a French edition
- Seneca, De Zedige werken (3 vols., 1658-1661)
- René Descartes, Proeven der wijsbegeerte (1659)
- Desiderius Erasmus, Annotationes of Aanteekeningen op 't Nieuwe Testament (1663)
- Quintus Curtius, Romeinsche Historie (1666)
- René Descartes, Epistolae, edited by Johannes de Raey (1668)
- John Lyly, De vermaakelijke Historie, Zee- en Land-Reyze van Euphues (1668)
- Jean Puget de la Serre, Thomas Morus, of de Zegepraal des Geloofs en der standvastigheid, treurspel (1668)
- De Heilige Katarina Martelares, treurspel uit het Fransch (1668)
- Baruch Spinoza, Tractatus Theologico-Politicus (1670-1671). Clandestinely published in 1693 as De rechtzinnige theologant, of godgeleerde staatkundige verhandelinge (The Orthodox Theologian, or Theological-Political Treatise) by Henricus Koenraad (false imprint) in Amsterdam
- Beschrijvingen van de Oorlogen in Candia (1671)
- Michel de Montaigne, Alle de Werken van de Heer M. de Montaigne (1674)
- Guido Bentivoglio, Historie der Nederlandsche Oorloghen (1674)
- Baruch Spinoza, De nagelate schriften ("Opera Posthuma", 1677)
