= John of Ruysbroeck College, Laeken =

School in Brussels, Belgium

John van Ruysbroeck College
- Jan-van-Ruusbroeckollege (Dutch)

Location
- Avenue du Forum / Forumlaan 4; 1070 Laeken, City of Brussels, Brussels-Capital Region; Belgium
- Coordinates: 50°53′51″N 4°21′20″E

Information
- Motto: Jouw traject is ons project (Dutch)
- Religious affiliation: Jesuit (Catholic)
- Established: 1968; 58 years ago
- Principal: Philippe Cobbaert
- Gender: Mixed
- Enrollment: 720
- Mascot: Pelican
- Website: www.ruusbroec.be

John van Ruysbroeck College (Dutch: Jan-van-Ruusbroeckollege) is a mixed Dutch-language Catholic secondary school in Laeken, in the north-west of the City of Brussels, Belgium. It was established in 1968 by the Society of Jesus and is named after John van Ruysbroeck.

== History ==
John van Ruysbroeck College was founded in 1968 as a boys-only school. In 1994, it became co-educational.

The school is governed by a non-profit association and belongs to a group of seven Jesuit colleges that offer private counselling. In 1999, the college joined forces with St John Berchmans College in Brussels to start this scheme.

In the 2017–18 school year, the college had 720 students.

== Notable former pupils ==
- Bert Anciaux
- Bart Verhaeghe

== See also ==
- List of Jesuit sites in Belgium
- Archdiocese of Mechelen–Brussels
