= Ruusbroec Institute =

The Ruusbroec Institute (Dutch: Ruusbroecgenootschap) is an institution for the study of the history of religious culture, spirituality and mysticism in the Low Countries. It is named after the 14th-century Flemish mystical author John of Ruusbroec.

== History ==
The Ruusbroecgenootschap was established in 1925 by three Jesuit scholars, Desideer Stracke, Jozef Van Mierlo and Leonce Reypens, all of whom had a background in the study of Dutch literature. They were soon joined by the Bollandist Jan-Baptist Poukens, who had trained as a classicist.

In 1973, the institute became an independent research centre within the Jesuit university in Antwerp, the University Faculties of St Ignatius, and in 2003 this became a constituent part of the merged University of Antwerp.

The original focus of research was on Flemish mysticism up to 1750, but this gradually widened to other aspects of religious culture, later periods, and other mystical traditions. Pierre Delsaerdt was appointed director of the institute in 2020.

== Library ==
The institute's library, which is part of the Flanders Heritage Library network, holds over 30,000 printed books from the hand press era, 500 manuscripts dating from the 14th to the 19th century, and 40,000 devotional prints, mostly produced in Antwerp between 1600 and 1850. The collection is owned by a non-profit organisation, Loyola vzw.

== Publications ==
The institute's flagship journal is Ons Geestelijk Erf ("Our Spiritual Heritage"), founded in 1927.

There is also a series of studies and editions, Studiën en tekstuitgaven van Ons Geestelijk Erf, which includes the 10-volume modern critical edition of the works of Jan van Ruusbroec.
