= Humblebrag =

Boasting via false modesty

Humblebragging is the behavior of boasting under the pretenses of a complaint or modesty. The term was coined by comedian Harris Wittels.

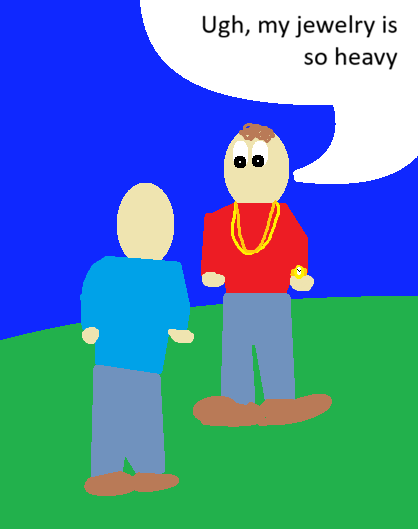
A man humblebrags to another about his jewelry

== History ==
The term humblebrag was first used in 2010 by Harris Wittels as the name of his Twitter account, @Humblebrag, where he would retweet posts he considered to be humblebrags. The posts was later developed into a Grantland column. In 2012, he published a book about the concept, Humblebrag: The Art of False Modesty. The popularity of the word led the American Dialect Society to proclaim it their most useful Word of the Year for 2011. In 2014, the term was featured in a Jeopardy question.

== Examples ==
The following comments have been described as humblebrags by those reporting on the phenomenon:

- “Being famous and having a fender bender is weird. You want to be upset but the other drivers just thrilled & giddy that it’s you.”
- "I hate that I look so young; even a 19-year-old hit on me!"
- "Ugh, it's so annoying! I've lost so much weight that none of my clothes fit me anymore!"
- “Why do I always get asked to work on the most important assignment?”

== Presentation ==
Humblebragging is one method of bragging while avoiding seeming impolite and breaking social rules. Multiple rhetorical techniques have been used in humblebragging, including asking questions, complaining, and presenting information in a seemingly objective way.

== Psychological impacts ==
Studies on humblebragging suggest that it generally makes worse impression on others than standard bragging. While humblebragging would appear to make one seem competent and likable, due to its lack of sincerity, it is ineffective and makes one seem both more unlikable and less competent. Wittels claimed that humblebragging "can only serve to make people jealous of the posters and/or hate them".

== See also ==
- False humility
