= Ernest Hello =

French Roman Catholic writer

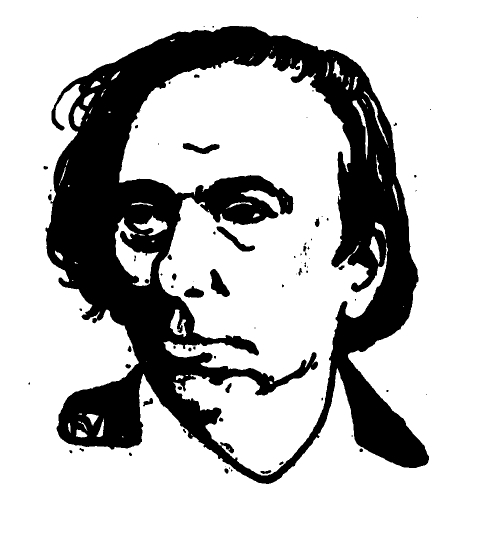
- Hello, 1898 painting
- Born: 1828; Tréguier, Brittany, France
- Died: 1885 (aged 56–57)
- Education: College Louis-le-Grand, Paris
- Occupations: Writer and journalist
- Spouse: Zoë Berthier
- Writing career
- Language: French
- Period: 19th century
- Genre: Non-fiction
- Subjects: Philosophy, theology, literary criticism
- Notable work: Le Siècle

Ernest Hello (4 November 1828 – 14 July 1885) was a French Roman Catholic writer, who produced books and articles on philosophy, theology, and literature.

== Life ==
Born at Lorient, in Brittany, he was the son of a lawyer who held posts of great importance at Rennes and in Paris. He bequeathed the little ancestral estate of Keroman where the philosopher-essayist died. The writer was a first-class student in Rennes and obtained honours as a law graduate at the famous College Louis-le-Grand in Paris, but declined that profession due to its moral ambivalence. Partly under the influence of the works of Jean-Baptiste Henri Lacordaire, Jules Amédée Barbey d'Aurevilly and Louis Veuillot, the latter two being the most brilliant and feared polemical crusaders of the Church in the press, he founded a newspaper Le Croisé ("The Crusader") in 1859 but it only lasted two years due to a disagreement with his co-founder. This was one of the greatest disappointments of his life. However, he wrote much in other papers and thereafter his essays appeared throughout France as well as in Belgium and New Orleans' "Le Propagateur".

Frail from infancy, he also suffered from a spinal or bone disease. This struggle probably tinged his prose with a melancholy strain, which is strikingly original as mentioned in J.-K. Huysmans' work (they shared a veneration of the mystic John of Ruysbroeck). Both writers, like Leon Bloy, are almost impossible to translate. In 1857 he married Zoë Berthier, an army officer's daughter and talented writer herself, who was ten years older and a friend for some years before their marriage. She became his devoted nurse, which brought upon herself abuse from gutter journalists of the time for her estimable guardianship.

== Works ==
Hello's work is somewhat varied in form but uniform in spirit. His best-known book, Physionomie de saints (1875), which has been translated into English (1903) as Studies in Saintship, does not display his qualities best. Contes extraordinaires, published not long before his death, is more original, being often cited for its artistic yet lucid prose.

But Ernest Hello is mostly remembered now for a series of philosophical and critical essays, from Renan, l'Allemagne et l'atheisme (1861), which was re-published in an enlarged edition posthumously, through L'Homme (1871) on life, art and science in relation to present-day life (it was in its 7th edition by 1905), and Les Plateaux de la balance (1880) to the posthumously published Le Siècle, probably his master-work.

His literary studies include work on Shakespeare, Hugo and other writers. His writing also addressed the relationship between philosophy, theology, and modern life, including questions of religious thought, human experience, and creative interpretation.

== Publications ==
- M. Renan, l'Allemagne et l'Athéisme au XIXe Siècle (1859).
- Le Style (1861).
- Œuvres Choisies de Jeanne Chézard de Matel (1870).
- Le Jour du Seigneur (1871).
- L'Homme (1872).
- Physionomies de Saints (1875).
- Contes extraordinaires (1879).
- Les Plateaux de la Balance (1880).
- Philosophie et Athéisme (1888).
- Le Siècle (1896).
- Paroles de Dieu (1899).
- Prières et Méditations Inédites (1911).
- Du Neant à Dieu (1921).
  - I. Contradictions et Synthèse.
  - II. l'Amour du Néant pour l'Être. La Prière du Néant à l'Être.
- Regards et lumières (1923).

Translated into English

- Life, Science and Art (1912).
- Studies in Saintship (1903).
- Style (Theory and History), Sunny Lou Publishing, ISBN 978-1-955392-10-5, 2021.
