= Groenendael Priory =

Former abbey in Hoeilaart, Belgium

Coordinates: 50°45′57.29″N 4°26′7.04″E

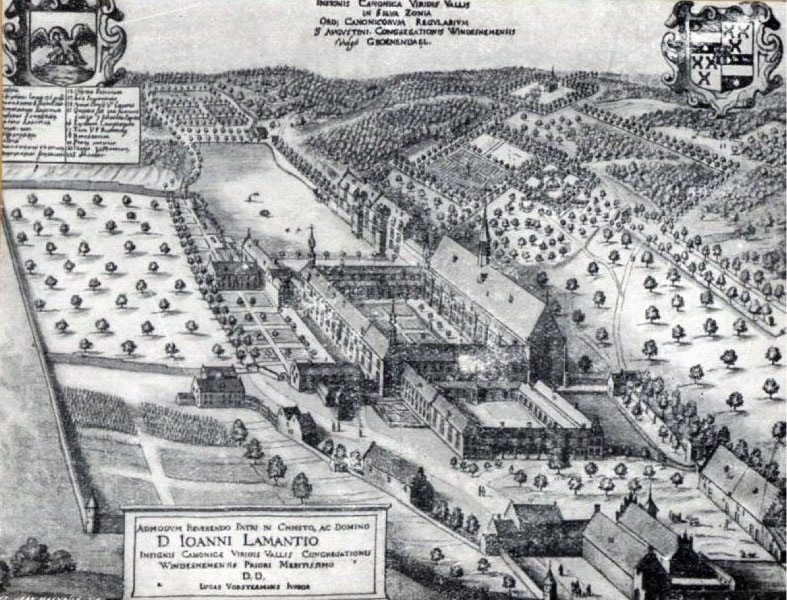
Groenendael Priory, c. 1657

Groenendael Priory (Dutch: Priorij van Groenendaal; French: Prieuré de Groenendael; meaning, "green valley"; alternate, Gruenendale) is located in the Sonian Forest in the municipality of Hoeilaart in Flemish Brabant, about 10 kilometres (6.2 mi) south-east of Brussels, Belgium.

== History ==
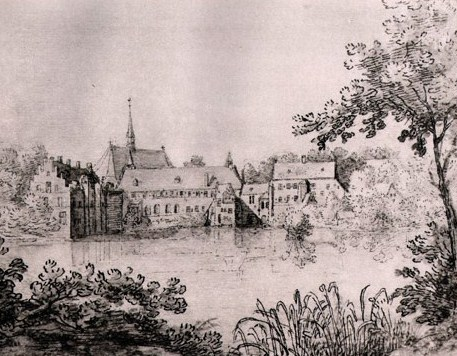
Groenendael Priory, 1910

Duchess Joanna of Brabant had allotted the forest land to the priory, as well as to many other monasteries in the region. In 1304, an old shooting lodge of Duke John II of Brabant was given to a hermit on the condition that, upon his death, it would go to another religious person who was serving God.

Following this, a community was established at the site around 1343 by three canons who had left the Church of St. Michael and St. Gudula (now Brussels' cathedral), seeking space outside the city: John of Ruysbroeck, Jan Hinckaert and Frank van Coudenberg. On 13 March 1349, this community became formalised as a monastery of Augustinian canons. Coudenberg became the first provost and Ruysbroeck the first prior. Their association with the canonical order of St. Augustine was very loose, despite attempts by the Augustinian abbey of Abbey of St. Victor, Paris. Their revenue came from selling wood, as well as from bequests and legacies.

The monastery became famous during the late 14th century, largely on account of Ruysbroeck's reputation as a spiritual guide and writer, with many people travelling to Groenendaal to visit him. After Ruysbroeck's death in 1381, his relics were preserved at the monastery. Groenendaal's importance at that time stemmed not only from the community that formed there, but also from its writings, which greatly influenced later spiritual and mystical thought. This was particularly evident in the case of Ruysbroeck's writings. The works of other members of the Groenendaal community, including Willem Jordaens, who lived at Groenendaal from 1353 until his death, Jan van Leeuwen, Godeverd van Wevele, and Jan van Schoonhoven, received some attention at the time, especially among Dutch readers. These writers have also been increasingly studied in recent years.

Groenendaal's existence as an independent monastery did not last long. The religious group continued in the late 14th and early 15th centuries, with a religious choir, but without lay brothers. The necrology includes the names of these brothers. The monks lived off the produce from their estate, which included orchards, a nursery, and kitchen gardens. The Benedictine nuns of the forest lived next to the priory.

On 7 May 1413, the independent house of Augustinian canons at Groenendaal was absorbed into the Windesheim congregation of the Devotio Moderna. Groenendael lost the title of monastery and became a priory, which was rebuilt and enlarged between 1450 and 1500. In 1520, Philip of Cleves erected a palace near the monastic buildings, which often served as hunting accommodations for Charles V, Holy Roman Emperor. The Infanta Isabella frequently stayed there and also contributed to its embellishment. Charles V often came to Groenendael with other royalty to indulge in the sport of hunting. At the end of one such hunting party, a banquet was held, which brought together Charles V, Philip II of Spain, Eleanor of Austria (widow of Francis I of France), Mary of Hungary, Ferdinand of Austria and his wife, as well as Mulay Hassan (former king of Tunis).

By the late 18th century, the site had fallen into disuse. It was referred to as a 'useless convent' in 1784; the church and other buildings were sold by Holy Roman Emperor Joseph II and demolished three years later in 1787. The furniture was scattered. An attempt by the Council of Brabant to restore the priory in 1790 failed with the arrival of the French. The coup de grâce occurred in 1796. Ruysbroeck's relics, which had been preserved at the priory until 1783, were taken to Brussels when the priory was demolished, only to be lost during the French Revolution.

== Architecture and fittings ==
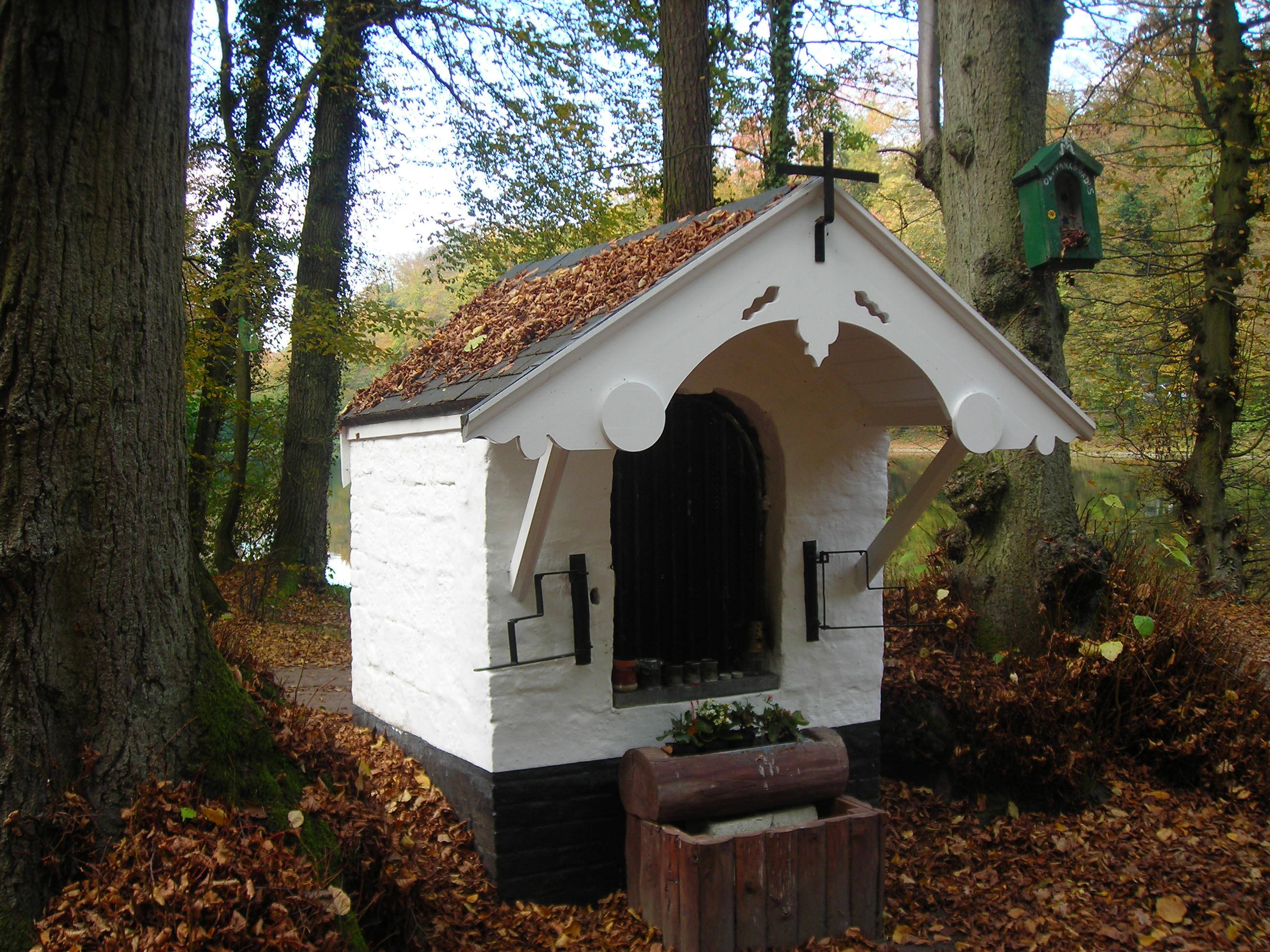
A small chapel near the priory, which was used by John of Ruysbroeck

A chapel with two altars, which were built by Ruysbroeck, Coudenberg, Hinckaert, and Jan van Affinghem (the cook), was consecrated in March 1344. The cloister is characterised by arched windows in an otherwise simple building. The prior's house, which was built in 1783, shortly before the priory's final closing, was restored in 2009.

The scriptorium, which was built shortly after 1435, and abandoned in the early 16th century after the rise of the water table, was re-discovered in 2005. The room and its preserved architecture are unique examples of medieval architecture; it is in need of restoration. The laundry room, built in 1743, was converted into a ranger's house in the 19th century. The church's nave was also converted. The barn, built after 1777, now houses the Bosmuseum 'Jan van Ruusbroec' (Museum of the Sonian Forest).

A water mill, built in 1662 along the river, was transformed into a house during the second half of the 18th century. Terraced gardens are located on the southern slope behind the church's nave. Some of the church's furniture was reused in other local churches. The main altar is from Herfelingen and other are from Erps-Kwerps, the stalls were made in Vilvoorde, and the confessionals are from Wezembeek. The Bishop of Cambrai was benefactor of Groenendael's monastic library.

The remains of the former priory have been protected since 1998.
