= Mārdava =

Mārdava (Sanskrit: मार्दव) or Maddava (Pali) means mildness, softness, gentleness, kindness, weakness and pliancy (leniency).

Mardava as a divine quality is to be lenient with those who make mistakes, to never be offended and remains always quiet when people revile or ignore God. To be gentle is to make friends easily. It is to know that ignorance is the likely reasons for the naysaying response. Mardava is softness, letting go of ego. Mardava is a gentleness with all objects and weakness, it is compassion extended to the lifeless and weak, Swami Tejomayānanda explains:

"We can augment our compassion with the practice of mārdavam or gentleness. This is an attitude of mind that is not only limited to living things but extends to insentient material objects as well. If we handle all the things with care, they will serve us beautifully. For instance, some people take proper care of their cars but others are so rough with them, there is no gentleness when they apply the brake, change gears or shut the door. In the same way, we should remember that shoes are serving our feet and we should place them down with respect. Once a man came running to a Zen Master, threw his shoes here and there and fell at his feet saying, Please teach me about God. The Master calmly replied, First learn to respect your shoes. How we take care of inert objects reveals the state of the mind. This mārdavam is a disposition of the mind. When a person has this state of mind, all his actions have a quality of gentleness.

In Hinduism, there are eight aśtopāyas, or eight ways of attaining moksha, and Mārdava is one of them, the other seven being – Yajna (यज्ञ) (sacrifices), Dāna (दान) (charity), Vedādhyayana (the study of the Vedas), Tapas (तप) (penance, deep meditation), Dama (दम) (subduing the senses by restraining the sense-organs), Satya (सत्य) (truth in speech and act), and Tyāga (त्याग) (renunciation of desire).

In Jainism, mārdava or compassion or supreme tenderness or humility, which is part of Right Belief, is a means to destroy vanity or egotism which gives rise to many evils which defile the virtues of our soul; it is held that humility is the foundation of compassion and the basis for salvation. With the eight kinds of pride totally avoided, knowledge brings humility. Tattvārthasūtra (IX.6) lists mārdava (modesty) as one of the ten aspects of the highest dharma .

Bhagavad Gita (XVI.1-3) also classifies mārdava as a divine quality and the Buddhists consider mārdava as the realization of Dharma (dharma-pratipatti).

Patanjali mentions mārdava as a low pitch along with anvavavasarga and udutā khasya; he explains this word as svarasya mridutā or snigdhatā (smoothness of sound).

== See also ==
- Aesop's Fables, and The North Wind and the Sun
