= False humility =

Insincere or strategic display of modesty

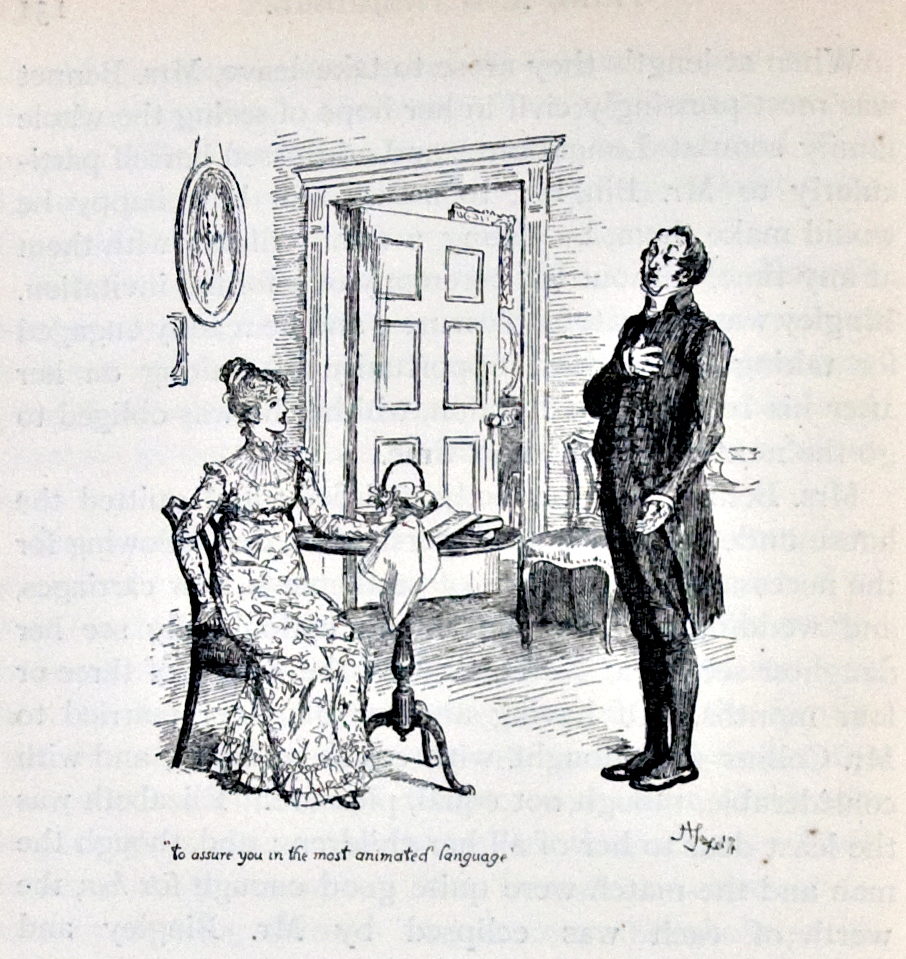
Mr. Collins displaying exaggerated modesty — An illustration from Pride and Prejudice by Jane Austen. The character of Mr. Collins is often cited as a literary example of false humility, combining performative modesty with self-importance.

False humility, also known as pseudo-humility, refers to a display of humility that is insincere or strategically employed to serve ulterior motives such as manipulation, self-promotion, or social validation. False humility often disguises arrogance, self-interest, or a desire for praise.

== Psychological perspective ==
In psychology, false humility may function as a defense mechanism or a form of impression management. Some individuals use it to mask narcissistic personality traits or to gain social favor while avoiding the appearance of overt self-centeredness.

False humility is also linked to the phenomenon known as humblebragging, which combines apparent modesty with subtle self-promotion. Studies suggest that humblebragging tends to backfire, resulting in negative social evaluations.

== Sociological perspective ==
From a sociological standpoint, false humility can be viewed as a form of performative behavior shaped by social norms and cultural expectations. In highly competitive or status-conscious environments, individuals may deliberately downplay their achievements to conform to ideals of modesty, while simultaneously signaling social value. This dual function allows a person to navigate social hierarchies without explicitly violating norms around humility.

The popularization of the term Humblebrag in the digital age has played a key role in bringing attention to this phenomenon. The term was coined by American comedian and writer Harris Wittels, who used it on social media and later in his 2012 book Humblebrag: The Art of False Modesty. Wittels highlighted how individuals use apparent modesty to disguise self-promotion and attention-seeking, making humblebragging a widely recognized example of false humility in contemporary discourse.

== Signs and behavioral indicators ==
LifeWay Christian Resources describes observable signs of false humility that may appear in interpersonal or professional settings. These behaviors often include:

- Deflecting praise excessively while subtly drawing attention back to oneself.
- Using self-deprecating remarks to invite contradiction or compliments.
- Performing acts of service publicly, with subtle expectations of recognition.
- Avoiding leadership or acknowledgment, while privately seeking influence or control.
- Constantly comparing oneself to others to reinforce a perception of moral or spiritual superiority.

Such patterns, while not universally diagnostic, may reflect a tendency to use modesty as a social strategy rather than a genuine trait.

== Related concepts ==
- Social desirability bias
- Virtue signalling
