= Thomas á Jesu =

Spanish Discalced Carmelite and mystic (1564–1627)

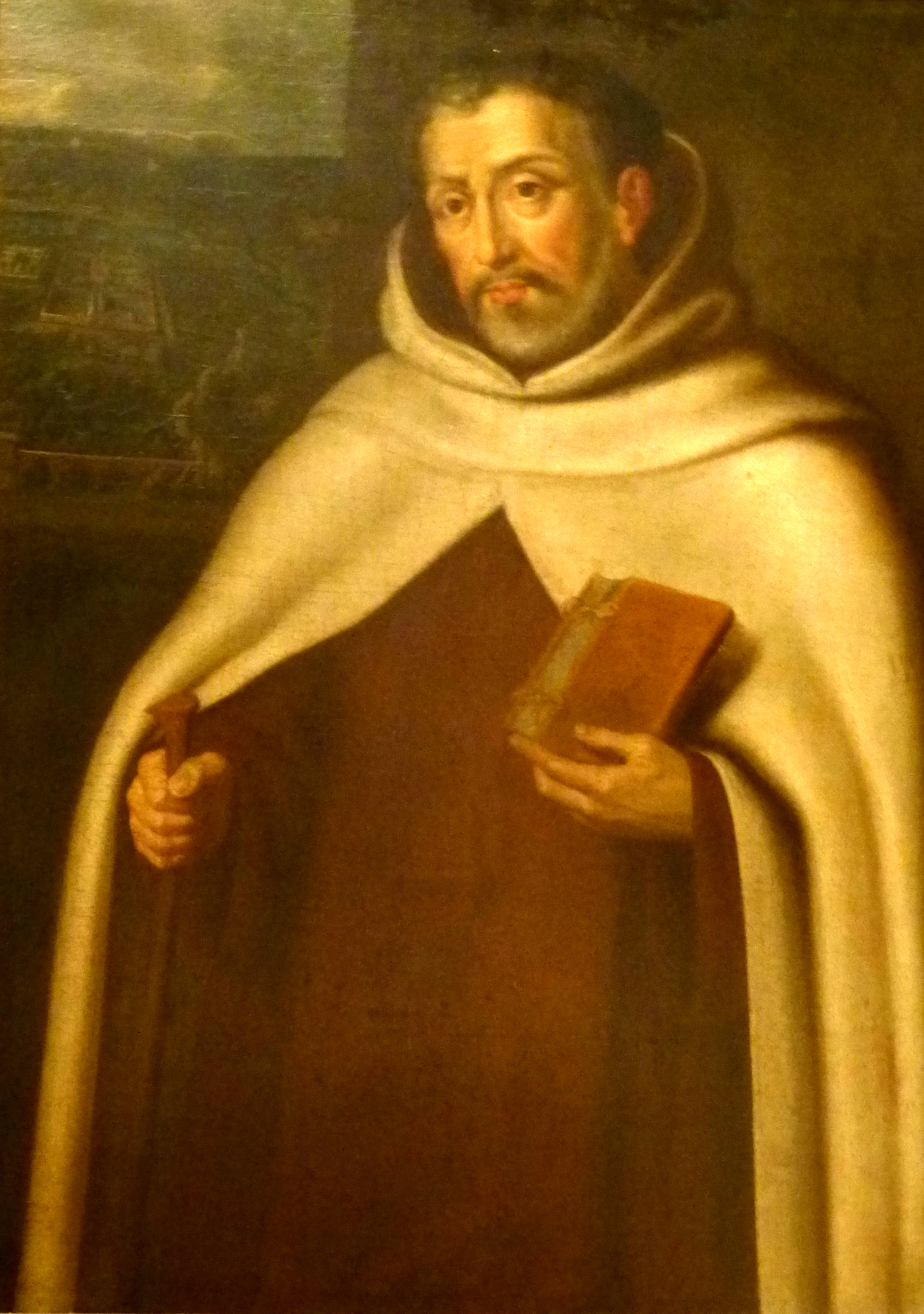

Personal details
- Born: 1564
- Died: 24 May 1627 (aged 62–63)

Thomas á Jesu, OCD (1564 – 24 May 1627) was a Discalced Carmelite and writer on mystical theology who is principally known for establishing the Carmelite hermitages known as "deserts", and for his writings on prayer.

== Biography ==
Thomas was born in Baeza in southern Spain. His parents were Don Baltasar de Avila and Dona Teresa de Herrera. While studying law at the University of Salamanca (he graduated in 1583), he read some of the unpublished writings of Teresa of Avila and in 1586 he became a monk in her order.

He filled many offices as a priest and founded both "desert" hermitages and ordinary convents across Europe while writing on Catholic theology. He died in Rome in 1627.

== Deserts ==
Thomas's deserts were in the tradition of the 16th-century Carmelite reform movement, facilitating intensive, personal, deep relationships with God. They were inspired by the life of the first Carmelites who lived on Mount Carmel in Palestine in the 1150s. He founded the first, es:Desierto de Bolarque, in Bolarque, Spain, in the summer of 1592.

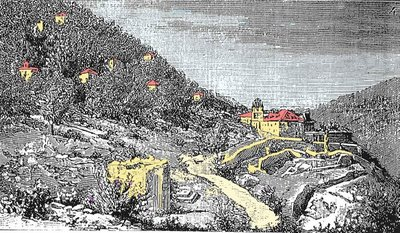
Desierto de Bolarque – The buildings at Bolarque – notice the many chapels

A desert consisted of about 24 small apartments, each with its own walled garden, and a common chapel, kitchen/refectory and library. Four hermits lived there permanently, while the remainder of spaces were occupied by priests from elsewhere who were allowed to spend one year living the desert life, after applying and being deemed able to withstand the strict rules. The monks maintained absolute silence. They kept the hours of the Divine Office and spent their time in prayer and manual labour. They ate a vegetarian diet and practiced fasting. Even smaller buildings dotted around the property (which was allowed to grow wild) were used for monks who wished to live in total isolation for Advent or Lent.

Thomas founded four deserts in Spain: at Bolarque, Las Batuecas, Las Nieves, and one in Catalonia. Other priests went on to found deserts in Santa Fe, Mexico (1606), Varazze, Italy (1616), Czerna, Poland (1631), Mannersdorf, Austria (1644). The movement reached its peak, with 22 deserts, in the 17th century, but only one, at Las Palmas, Spain, survived dissolution by church leaders in the 19th century.

== Writings ==
Like many Carmelites, Thomas wrote extensively. His treatise On Procuring the Salvation of All Peoples was published in Latin in 1613. His division of prayer into three states: "ordinary meditation, acquired contemplation, and infused contemplation" is still used and is considered one of the distinctive contributions of the Carmelites to Christian theology.

== See also ==
- Christian contemplation
