= Japanese people in Belgium =

Japanese Belgians; 日系ベルギー人 (Japanese); Belgisch Japans (Dutch); Japonais en Belgique (French)
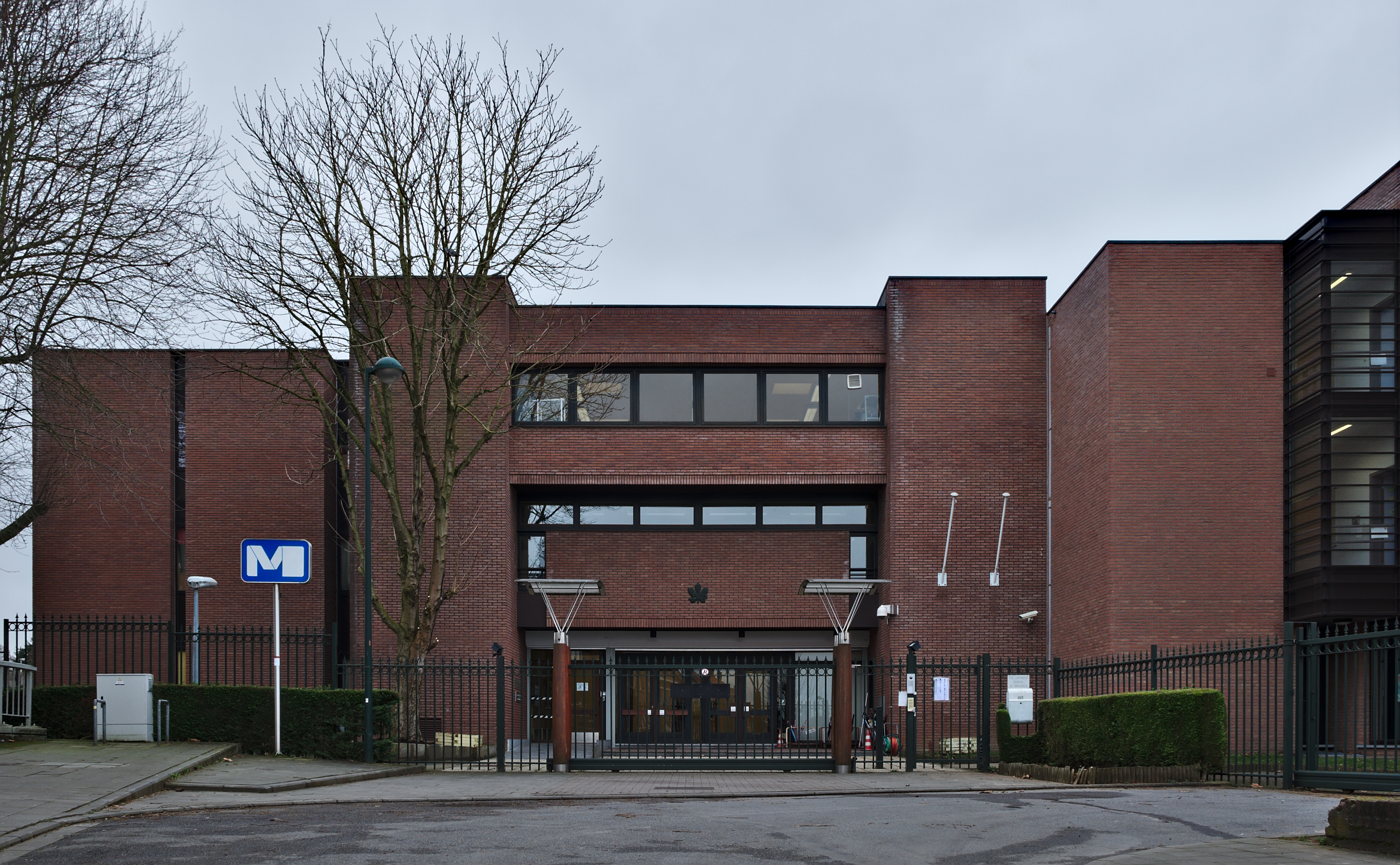
- The Japanese School of Brussels

Total population
- 4,931 (2017)

Regions with significant populations
- Brussels; Antwerp

Languages
- Dutch | French | German | Japanese

Religion
- Shinto; Buddhism; Christianity; Irreligion

Related ethnic groups
- Overseas Japanese

Japanese people in Belgium or Japanese Belgians (Japanese: 日系ベルギー人) are Belgian citizens of Japanese ancestry.

== History ==
The Japanese started to arrive in considerable numbers in Brussels in the 1950s. At this time the Belgian-Japanese economic partnerships had started. By 1992, the Brussels Japanese community was already one of the largest in Europe.

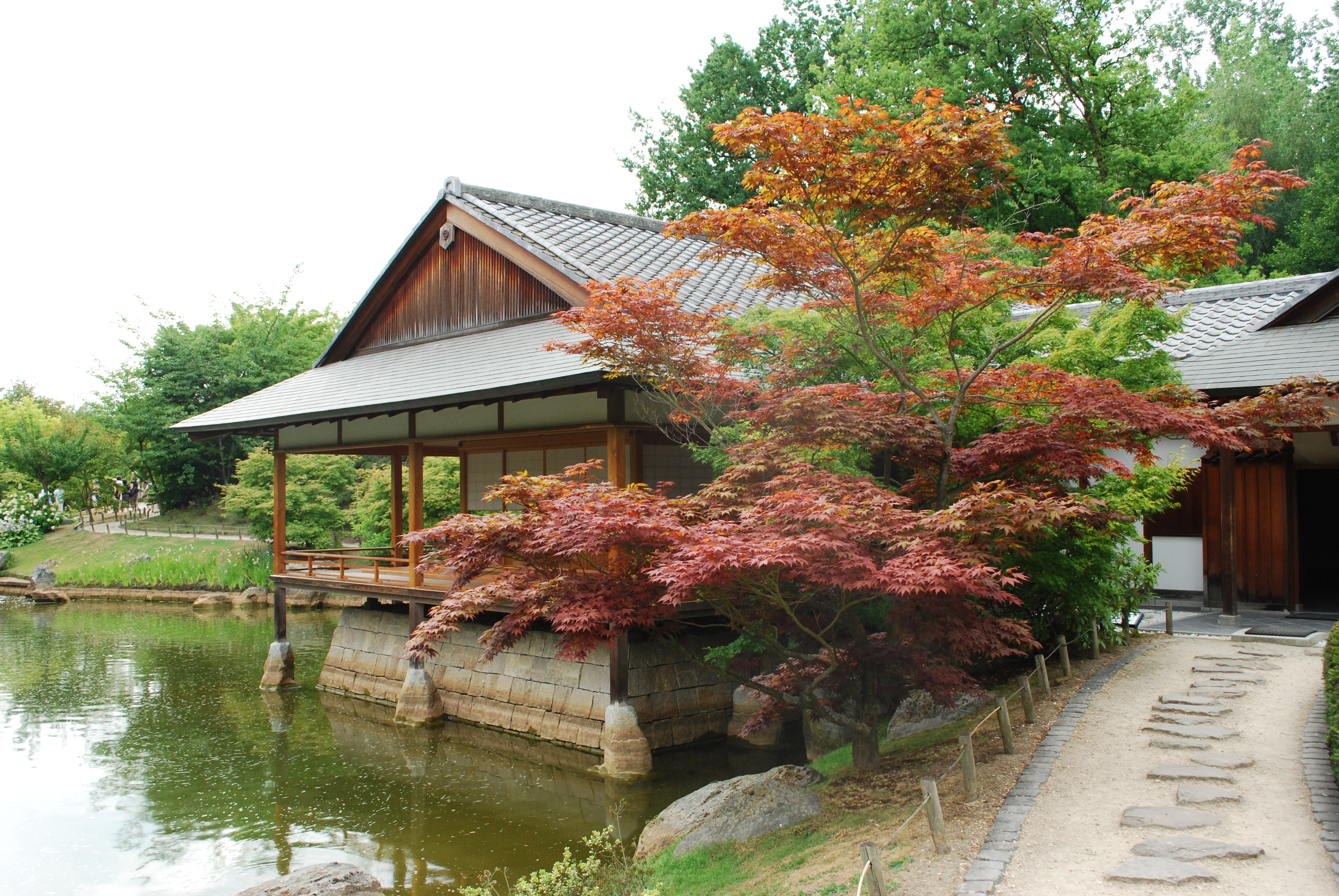
The Japanese Garden of Hasselt

In Hasselt there is a Japanese garden, donated to the Flemish city by the city of Itami, Japan. It is the largest Japanese garden in Western Europe, extending for 2.5 hectares. There are other Japanese gardens in Belgium, such as the one in the city of Ostend. There is a good relationship between the city of Ostend and the Japanese company Daikin, located in the industrial area of Ostend, and whose company buildings can be seen along the Ostend-Brussels highway. In Laeken, Brussels, there is a Japanese tower, built between 1900 and 1904 by order of King Leopold II. Also in Brussels there is a Japanese international school, the Japanese School of Brussels, founded in 1979 over a Japanese Saturday school opened in 1974. In Auderghem, near the Japanese School, there is a street named Avenue Nippone ("Nipponic Avenue"—Nippon means "Japan" in Japanese), opened and named thus in 1986, due to its proximity to the school. There are Japanese magazines published for Japanese Belgians.

== Demographics ==
As of 2021 there were about 6,000 Japanese living in Belgium. In 2016 there were 2,754 Japanese in Brussels alone. In 2016, most (71%) of the Brussels Japanese lived in the southeast of the Brussels Region, more precisely in Woluwe-Saint-Lambert, Woluwe-Saint-Pierre, Auderghem and Watermael-Boitsfort. 62% of the Japanese community in Belgium lives in Brussels.

The Japanese community of Belgium was by 1992 one of the largest in Europe. The number of Japanese in Belgium is currently stagnating compared to the rising numbers of other Asian nationalities such as the Chinese and Indians.

== Notable people ==
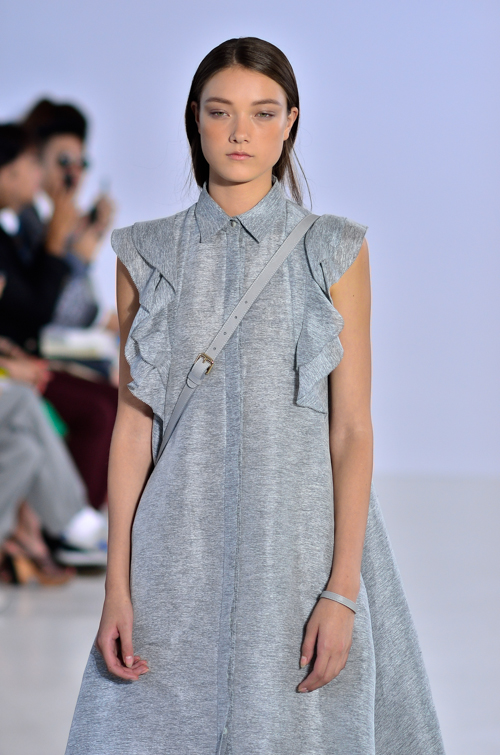
Yumi Lambert

- Yumi Lambert (1995), model

== See also ==
- Belgium–Japan relations
- Japanese community of Brussels
- The Japanese School of Brussels
- Japanese people in France
- Japanese people in Germany
- Japanese people in the Netherlands
