= Huygens (disambiguation) =

Huygens is a Dutch patronymic surname, meaning "son of Hugo".

Huygens may also refer to:

- Huygens (spacecraft), the probe which landed on Saturn's moon Titan in 2005
- 2801 Huygens, an asteroid
- Huygens (crater), a Martian crater
