= JSB =

JSB is an initialism which usually refers to the initials of Johann Sebastian Bach (1685–1750), German composer and musician of the Baroque period.

JSB may also refer to:

- Sandaime J Soul Brothers, a J-Pop dance and vocal unit from Tokyo and the third generation of the J Soul Brothers
- Japanese School of Beijing
- The Japanese School of Brussels
- The Jimmy Swift Band, Canadian Electro-Rock Quartet
- Júlio Sérgio Bertagnoli, Brazilian goalkeeper who plays for Roma
- John Seely Brown, a US researcher in organizations and computing
- John Stewart Bell, Irish physicist
- Julie Stewart-Binks, a Canadian television and sports reporter
- Judicial Studies Board, now the Judicial College
