= Jan Grauls =

Belgian diplomat (born 1948)

Baron Jan Grauls

Ernst & Young

Personal details
- Born: 12 February 1948 (age 78)

Jan, Baron Grauls, born 12 February 1948, is a former Belgian diplomat.

== Education ==
Jan Grauls studied Law at the University of Antwerp and at the Catholic University of Leuven.

== Career ==
Jan Grauls joined Ernst & Young as a senior advisor on 1 April 2013.

Before joining EY, he had been in the Belgian diplomatic service for more than forty years. His last assignment was Ambassador-Permanent Representative of Belgium to the United Nations in New York. In that capacity, he served as a member of the United Nations Security Council (he held the office of president of the Security Council in August 2008). He was also Vice President of the United Nations General Assembly and of the United Nations Economic and Social Council (Ecosoc). During his tenure in New York, he served as first chairman of the United Nations Peacebuilding Commission for the Central African Republic.

From 2002 until 2008, Jan Grauls was Secretary General of the Belgian Ministry of Foreign Affairs, Foreign Trade and Development Cooperation. Before occupying this position, he was chief of staff to the Belgian Minister of Foreign Affairs and Director General for Bilateral and Economic Relations.

From 1994 until 1997, Jan Grauls was deputy chief of staff and diplomatic advisor to the King of Belgium.

Jan Grauls served earlier in Bonn, Tunis, London, Washington and at the Belgian Permanent Representation to the European Union.

Since his retirement from the diplomatic service, baron Grauls became a member of the Board of the Francqui Foundation, the Europalia International Arts Festival, the Belgo-British Conference and the Quartier des Arts Association (Brussels).

== Personal life ==
Jan Grauls is married to Maria Gordts. They have four children, three daughters and one son.
