= Japanese community of Brussels =

Brussels includes a Japanese community, most of whom live in the Auderghem district. Auderghem includes a Japanese international school serving the community, The Japanese School of Brussels.

== Geography ==
As of 2004 the majority of Brussels' Japanese expatriate population lives in Auderghem. In 2005 there were 641 Japanese persons in Auderghem, making them the second largest foreign nationality and 2.017% of the commune's population. The presence of The Japanese School of Brussels in the Auderghem area has attracted Japanese families with school-aged children to the area around the school. One street was named avenue Nippone to commemorate the community.

As of 2013 Japanese live in Auderghem, Ixelles, Uccle, Watermael-Boitsfort, and Woluwe-Saint-Pierre.

== Commerce ==
As of 2013 the Belgian Living Guide, published by the Parents and Teachers Association, lists a series of businesses catering to the Japanese that are mostly in the centre of the city, around Avenue Louise. Some of these businesses are in proximity to the Japanese school. The guide lists four Japanese supermarkets and ten Japanese restaurants.

== Language ==
Japanese people generally encounter the French and English languages at work. All of the schooling options for Japanese national children provide French education, and Marie Conte-Helm, author of The Japanese and Europe: Economic and Cultural Encounters, wrote that "French language education thus becomes, to a greater or a lesser degree, a normal part" of the everyday lives in Japanese expatriates. Major Japanese companies such as Toyota subsidize costs of language lessons for employees and families. Conte-Helm wrote that "in the main" the wives "take up such opportunities" since they have an "arguably greater need" for daily life French proficiency. Conte-Helm wrote that in the business sectors and "to varying degrees, in daily life" the English language "serves [the Japanese] well" since it is understood and may be used in different parts of Belgium.

== Education ==
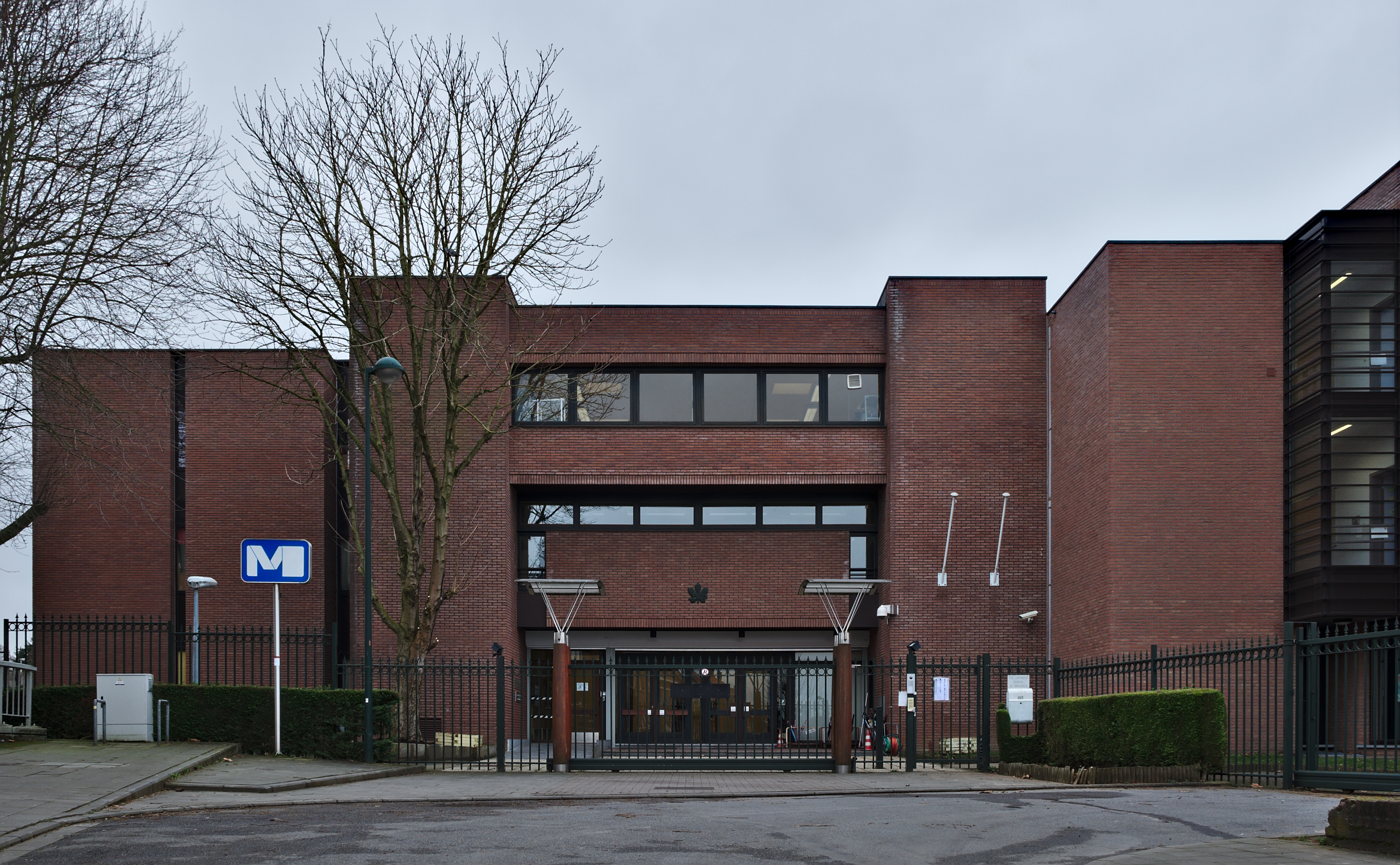
The Japanese School of Brussels

The Japanese School of Brussels, established in 1979 by the Nihonjinkai, is located in Auderghem. Conte-Helm wrote that the school "acts as a focal point for all local Japanese." The part-time Japanese school services are provided by The Japanese Saturday School of Brussels.

Most Japanese children in Brussels attend the Japanese school and international schools, and some attend French-language government schools. Specifically, as of 2012 most Japanese in elementary and junior high attend the Japanese school, and most high school-aged Japanese attend the International School of Brussels (ISB). Japanese companies subsidize the tuition of Japanese students at the ISB. Some high school-aged Japanese attend the French Lycee in Brussels and the St. John's International School in Waterloo.

Due to the prevalence of English as a second language among the Japanese people, the lack of influence of the Dutch language, the Japanese companies sponsoring the Japanese school, and the temporary nature of the Japanese presence, very few Japanese people attend Dutch-language government schools.

== Transport ==
In 2012 several officials from Belgium, including King Philippe, asked All Nippon Airways (ANA) to re-establish flights between Brussels and Tokyo. In 2015 ANA resumed service to Brussels; since 2001 Brussels had lacked air service to Tokyo.

== Institutions ==
The Nihonjinkai ASBL. (ベルギー日本人会 Berugī Nihonjinkai) in Brussels opened in 1966 with 100 members and in 1979 acquired a legal status. It administers the Japanese school, arranges seminars, and publishes specialist reports and a monthly newsletter. As of 2012 the club has 1,200 members.

The Parents and Teachers Association publishes a Japanese-language guide, the Belgian Living Guide, for Japanese expatriates.

== See also ==
- Avenue Nippone
- Belgian Japanese
