= Château of Val Duchesse =

Château and estate in Brussels, Belgium

- Château de Val Duchesse (French); Kasteel van Hertoginnedal (Dutch)
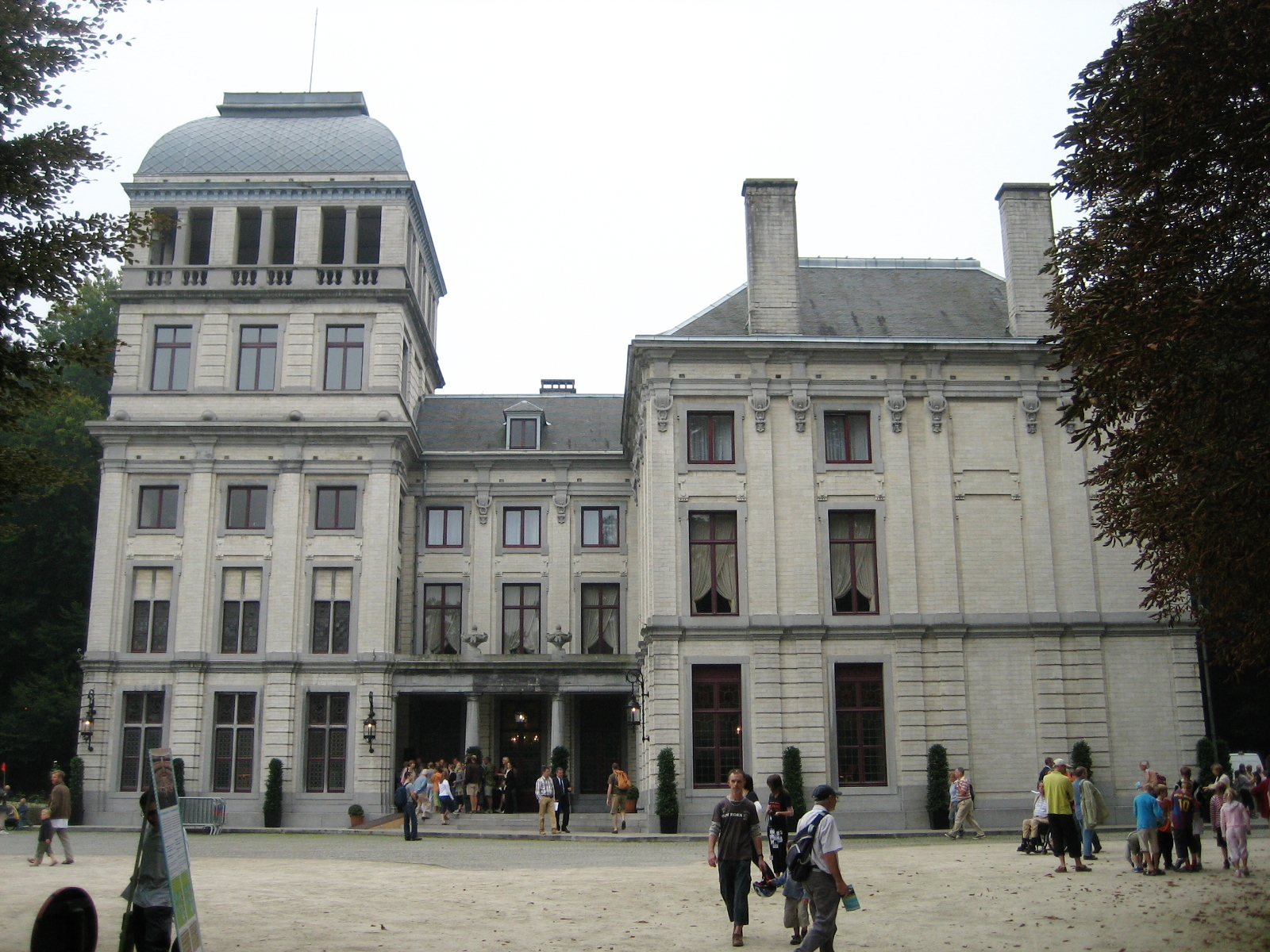
- A frontal view of the Château of Val Duchesse
- Interactive map of the Château of Val Duchesse area

General information
- Type: Château
- Architectural style: Neoclassical
- Location: Auderghem, Brussels-Capital Region, Belgium, Belgium
- Coordinates: 50°49′12.87″N 4°26′1.44″E

The Château of Val Duchesse (French: Château de Val Duchesse [ʃato də val dyʃɛs]; Dutch: Kasteel van Hertoginnedal) is a château and estate in the municipality of Auderghem in Brussels, Belgium. The château, which occupies the site of a former priory, is owned by the Belgian Royal Trust.

== History ==
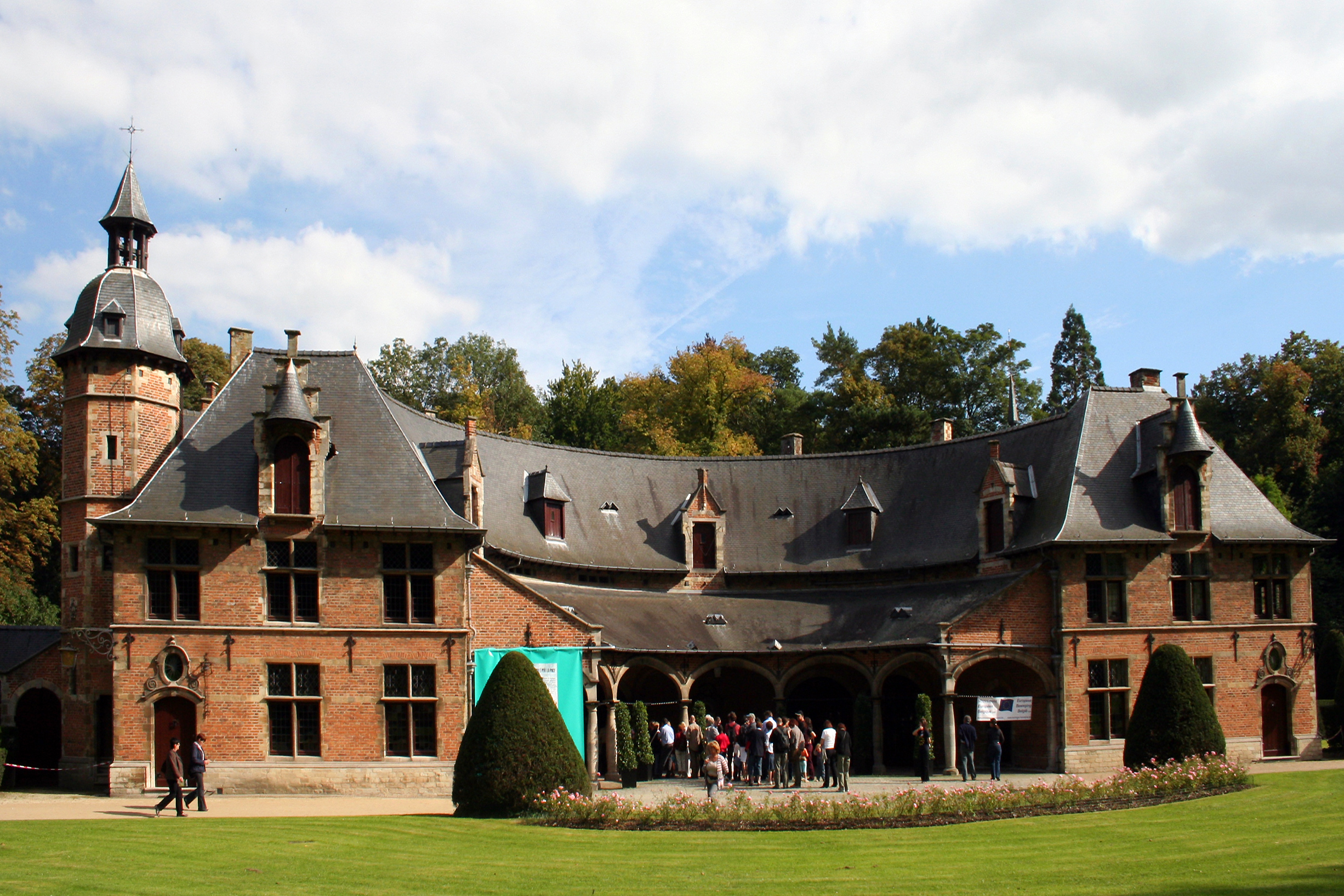
The reconstructed priory building at Val Duchesse

The priory for women was founded in 1262 by Adelaide of Burgundy, Duchess of Brabant, widow of Henry III, Duke of Brabant. Duchess Adelaide gave her name to the place—Val Duchesse in French or Hertoginnedal in Dutch (both meaning "Valley of the Duchess"). According to the legend, Aleydis was inspired by Saint Thomas of Aquin, who is said to have been a guest at Val Duchesse. It was the first priory for women in the Low Countries that followed the rule of Saint Dominic and was generously donated by Aleydis and other noble ladies. According to her wish, Aleydis' heart was interred in a now-disappeared mausoleum.

The priory further flourished and gained considerable wealth thanks to the generous gifts of numerous royal and noble families. In 1650, a wall was erected to protect the priory's various edifices. The present-day château was built as a residence for the prioress in 1780.

Since World War II, Val Duchesse has played an important role as a venue for negotiations in Belgian and European politics. In 1956, Paul Henri Spaak led the Intergovernmental Conference on the Common Market and Euratom at the château, which prepared the Treaties of Rome in 1957 and the foundation of the European Economic Community and Euratom in 1958. The first formal meeting of the Hallstein Commission, the first European Commission, under the presidency of Walter Hallstein, was also held there on 16 January 1958. From 23 to 25 April 1990, the château hosted the Western European Union International Conference, which agreed the sequence of accession of the Eastern European countries of the former Warsaw Pact to European structures. More recently, it has twice hosted the Belgo-British Conference, in 2002 and 2006.

== See also ==
- List of castles and châteaux in Belgium
- Neoclassical architecture in Belgium
- History of Brussels
- Culture of Belgium
- Belgium in the long nineteenth century
