= Rouge Cloître Abbey =

Former abbey in Brussels, Belgium

- Abbaye du Rouge-Cloître (French); Abdij van het Roodklooster (Dutch)
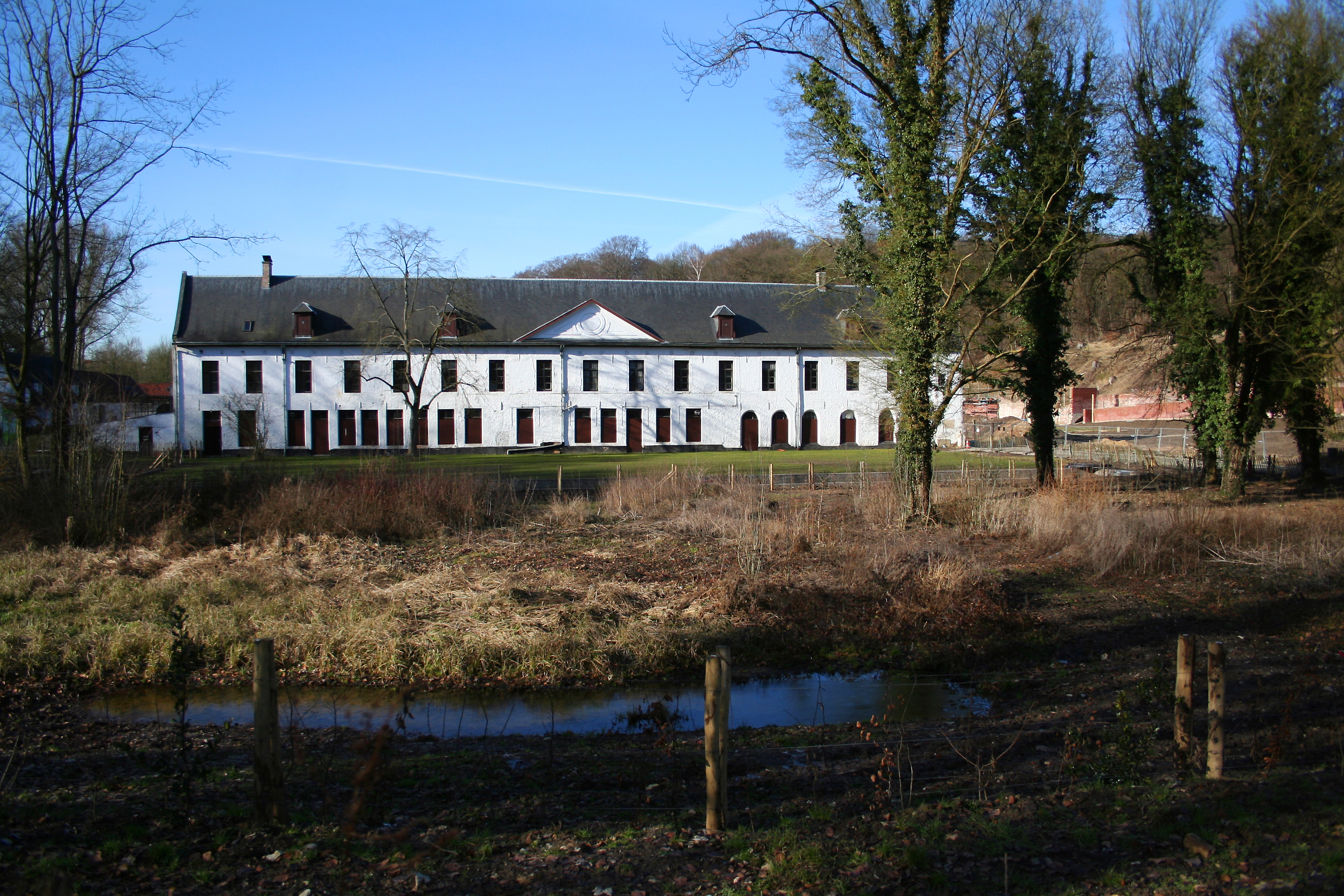
- View of the priory of Rouge Cloître Abbey
- Interactive map of the Rouge Cloître Abbey area

General information
- Type: Abbey
- Location: Auderghem, Brussels-Capital Region, Belgium
- Coordinates: 50°48′28″N 4°26′38″E
- Closed: Deconsecrated in 1796

Rouge Cloître Abbey (French: Abbaye du Rouge-Cloître) or Roodklooster Abbey (Dutch: Abdij van het Roodklooster) is a former Augustinian priory, founded in 1367. It is located in the Sonian Forest, in south-eastern Brussels, Belgium. It was abolished in 1796. Nowadays, it is administered by the municipality of Auderghem.

This area on the edge of the forest, surrounded by lakes through which the Roodkloosterbeek (Rouge-Cloître stream) passes, has been called the Rouge-Cloître estate from the 16th century until the present day. It was used for hunting in the 16th and 17th centuries and today is popular with nature-lovers and ramblers.

== Toponymy ==
The names Roodklooster or Rooklooster (in Dutch), or Rouge-Cloître (in French), come from the Middle Dutch Roode Cluse or Roode Kluis, which according to some historians means 'Red Hermitage'. According to this theory, the walls of the original hermitage were coated in a mixture of crushed tiles and bricks to make them waterproof, which produced the characteristic red colour. Quite naturally, the name continued to be used after the foundation became a priory. Another (more scientific) explanation is the location in a clearing in the forest (a 'ro' or 'rode'). A third (less likely) possibility is the meaning 'cross' (compare the Old English rood, from the Proto-Germanic rodo). Its official name in French is Saint-Paul en Soignes.

== History ==
=== Foundation ===
A hermitage was built in 1366 by a priest called Gilles Olivier and a layman called Walter van der Molen. William Daniel, a priest of the parish of Boendael, also celebrated Mass there occasionally. The founding charter was witnessed by Joanna, Duchess of Brabant, on 1 March 1367. Shortly after, some time between 1367 and 1369 and following the example of the nearby Groenendael Priory, the community adopted the Rule of Saint Augustine.

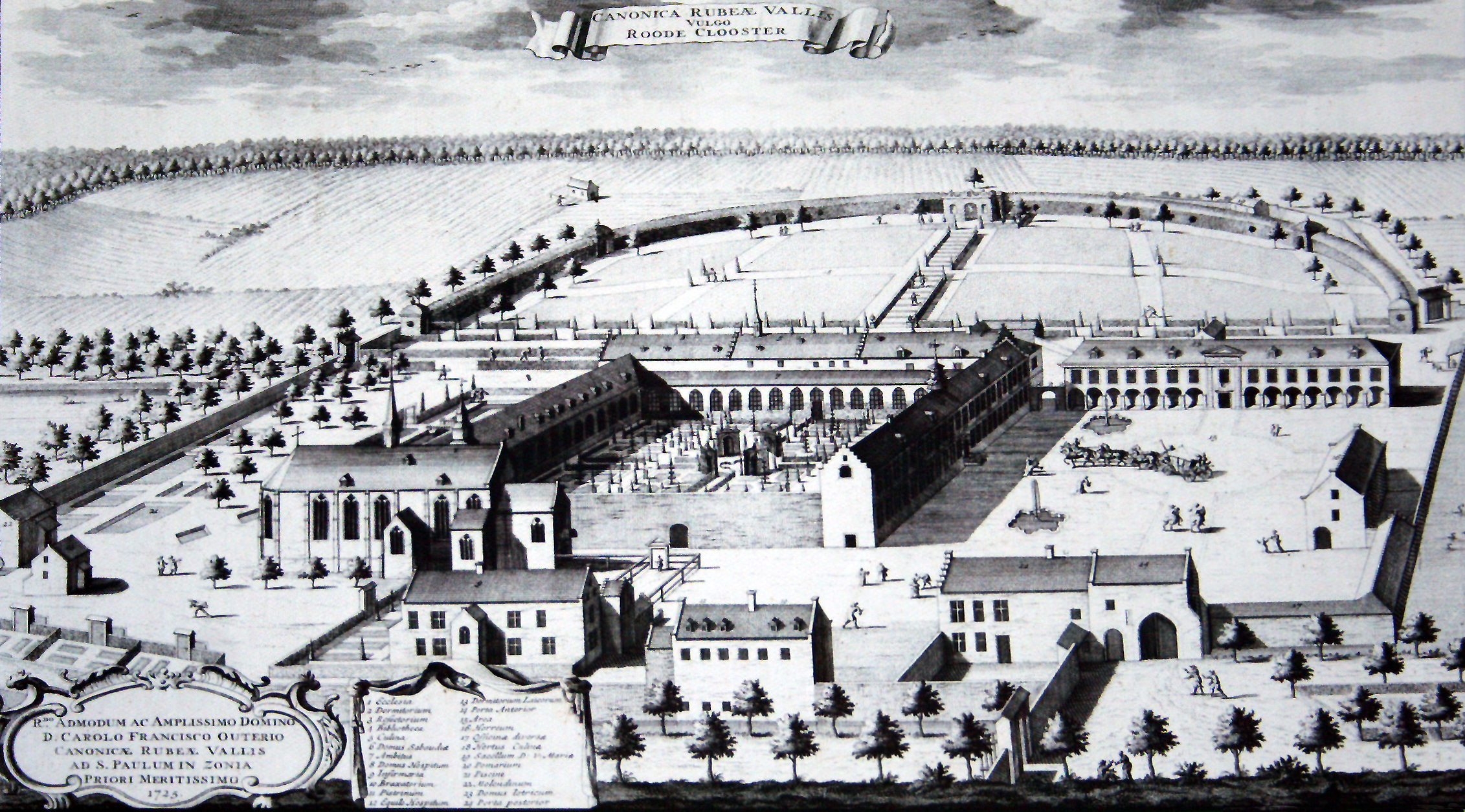
Rouge Cloître Abbey in 1725, engraving by Petrus de Doncker

The foundation was confirmed in 1373 by Gérard de Dainville, Bishop of Cambrai, and the following year, was affiliated to the order of Canons Regular of Saint Augustine. The community grew quickly. In 1381, construction of the church was initiated, after receiving gifts of land and lakes from the Duchess of Brabant, as well as privileges and tax exemptions.

=== Development ===
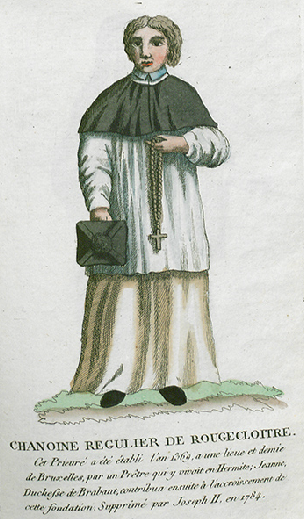
Typical canon regular of Rouge Cloître

In 1402, along with other Brabant priories, the Rouge-Cloître formed a congregation (or General Chapter), which was led by Groenendael. In 1412, as part of the Groenendael congregation, the abbey joined the Windesheim congregation. These first centuries of the priory were ones of great devotion. It possessed a fine library and developed a notable illumination workshop.

The location of the monastery provided easy access to the sandstone necessary for construction and wood from the forest was used for furniture and heating. Springs were plentiful in the area, the ponds supplied fish, and a water mill on the stream was used to grind grain and press oil. Part of the forest was cleared to provide cattle pasture. In 1400, an enclosure was created, which partly survives today.

The white sandstone church is decorated with paintings from Peter Paul Rubens' studio, and in the 16th century, the monastery was one of the most prestigious in the Spanish Netherlands, in large part due to its proximity to Brussels. Charles V, the Holy Roman Emperor, Albert VII, Archduke of Austria and Isabella of Spain all stayed there, as well as many other notable personages.

=== Decline and closure ===
At the end of the 16th century, during the Dutch Revolt, the priory was pillaged and the canons were forced to take refuge in Brussels until the uprising was over. A second disaster occurred in 1693, when a fire ravaged part of the buildings, though the library, which contained precious illuminated manuscripts, ancient books and valuable bindings, was spared.

The monastery was suppressed following an edict issued on 17 March 1783 by Emperor Joseph II in a bid to consolidate public finances. The edict abolished certain convents that had been declared "useless" because they lived off tithes, which pressurised the population whilst, according to Joseph II and the imperial government, providing no return for society; convents "where one leads only a purely contemplative life and is completely useless to religion, the State and one's neighbour". The valuables were removed on 13 April 1784. As a result, many books were later deposited by the imperial authorities in the Imperial Library in Vienna, where they are still kept to this day. Some books, however, followed an unofficial route and were sold contrary to instructions or stolen by private individuals

Six years later, in 1790, following the reinstatement of the old institutions, thanks to the victory of the Brabant Revolution over the Imperial Army, sixteen canons returned to settle in the Rouge-Cloître. The monks had indeed bought the abbey from the States of Brabant a year earlier, in July 1789, for 58,000 florins. However, in 1792, after the Battle of Jemappes, the abbey was again occupied and plundered by French revolutionary troops. Its definitive suppression came in 1796 with the abolition of monasteries decreed by the French Directory. On 14 June 1798, the buildings were sold as national property. The church was completely destroyed by fire in 1805.

== See also ==
- Roman Catholicism in Belgium
- Neoclassical architecture in Belgium
- History of Brussels
- Culture of Belgium
- Belgium in the long nineteenth century
