= Japanese Garden of Hasselt =

Park in the Belgian city of Hasselt

Japanese Garden
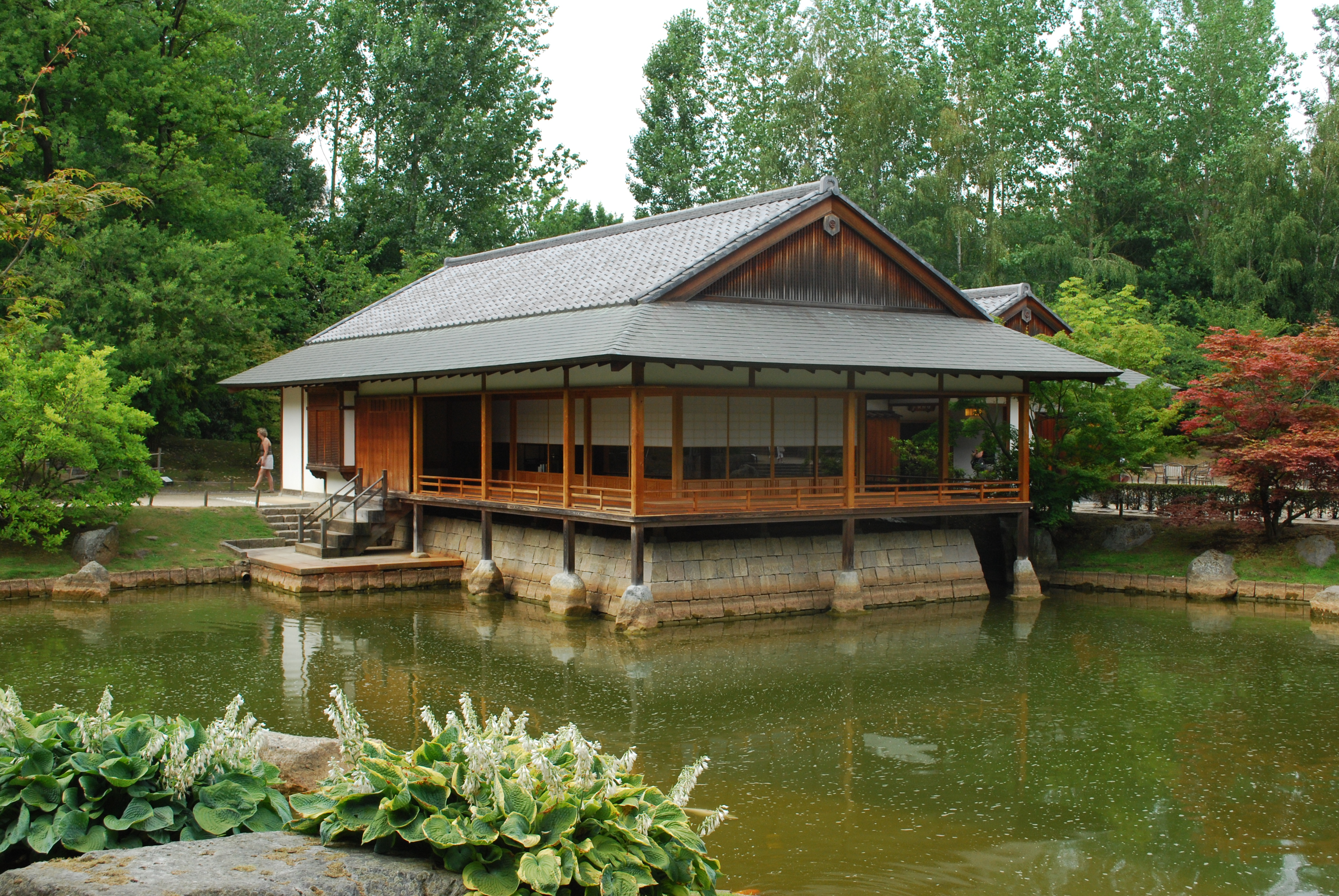
- Kōrokan in Hasselt's Japanese Garden
- Interactive map of Japanese Garden
- Type: Japanese garden
- Location: Gouverneur Verwilghensingel 15, Hasselt, Belgium
- Coordinates: 50°56′07″N 5°21′21″E
- Area: 2.5 hectares (6.2 acres)
- Status: Open year round

The Japanese Garden of Hasselt is a park in the Belgian city of Hasselt. Designed in the traditional 17th-century style, it was donated to the Belgian city by their sister city of Itami. It is the largest Japanese garden in Europe.

== History ==
In 1985, the city of Hasselt donated a carillon to Itami, in honour of the fiftieth anniversary of the Itami municipal administration system. The carillon, named 'Bells of Flanders' was inaugurated on November 9, 1990. In exchange, the city of Itami donated the Japanese garden.

The garden was designed by the Japanese architect Takayuki Inoue. The garden was built by a group of skilled Japanese gardeners in the early 1990s, and inaugurated on 20 November 1992, after 250 working days.

The location for the garden was chosen by architect Inoue. The city of Itami provided all financial and material contributions. The planting of the chosen area was preserved as close to the original as possible, showing the respect for nature of the Japanese.

The skilled Japanese gardeners landscaped the chosen site with a small hill, flowing brook, waterfall, pebbly beach, bridges, tea house and a number of other traditional Japanese buildings. Stones were brought from Austria to build the bridges, whereas the buildings were built exclusively with materials brought in from Japan. Many trees and bushes were planted. Measuring 2.5 hectares, Hasselt's Japanese garden is the largest Japanese garden in Europe.

The best time to visit it is considered to be spring, when 250 cherry trees flower.

== Gallery ==
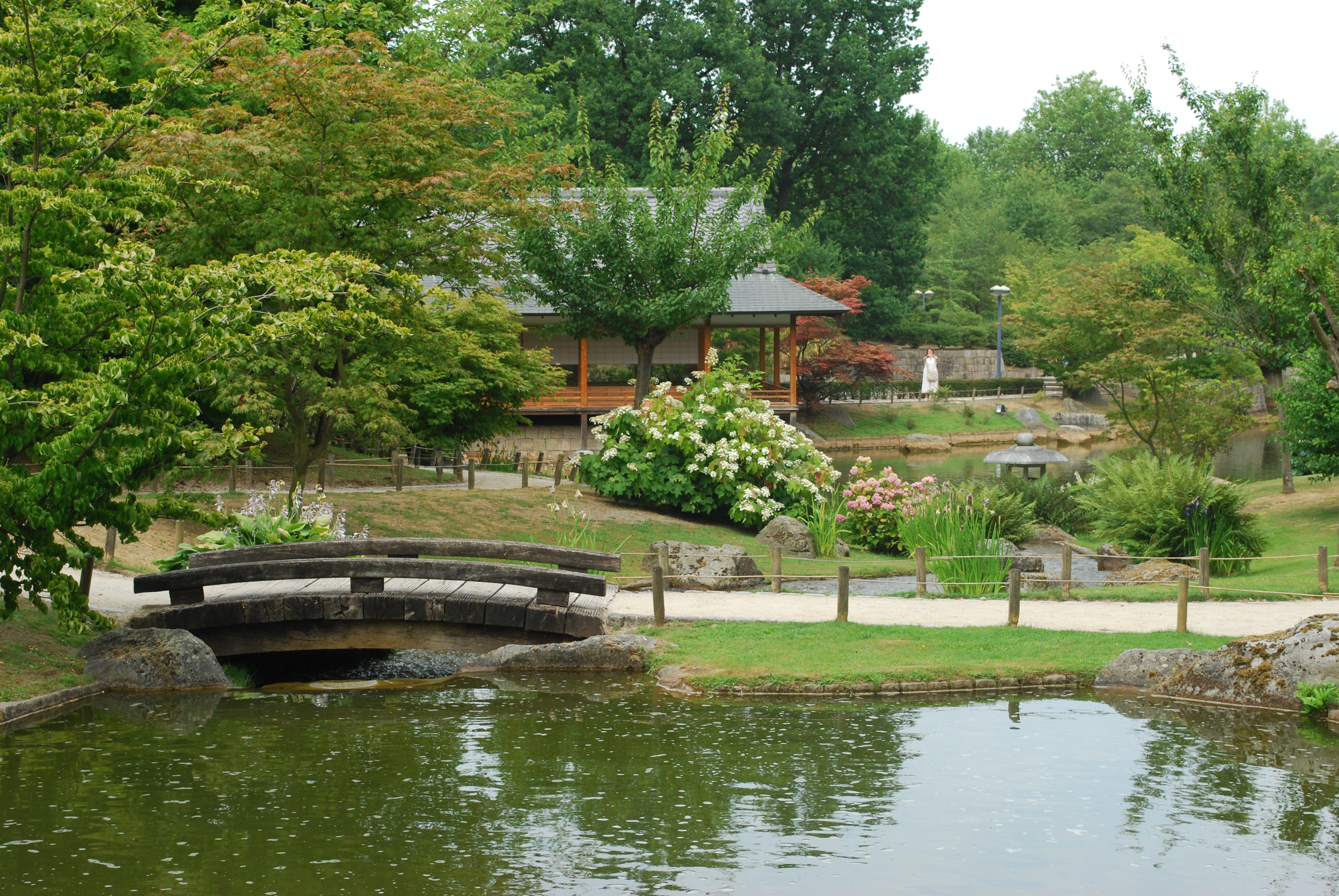
Bridge with tea house in the background

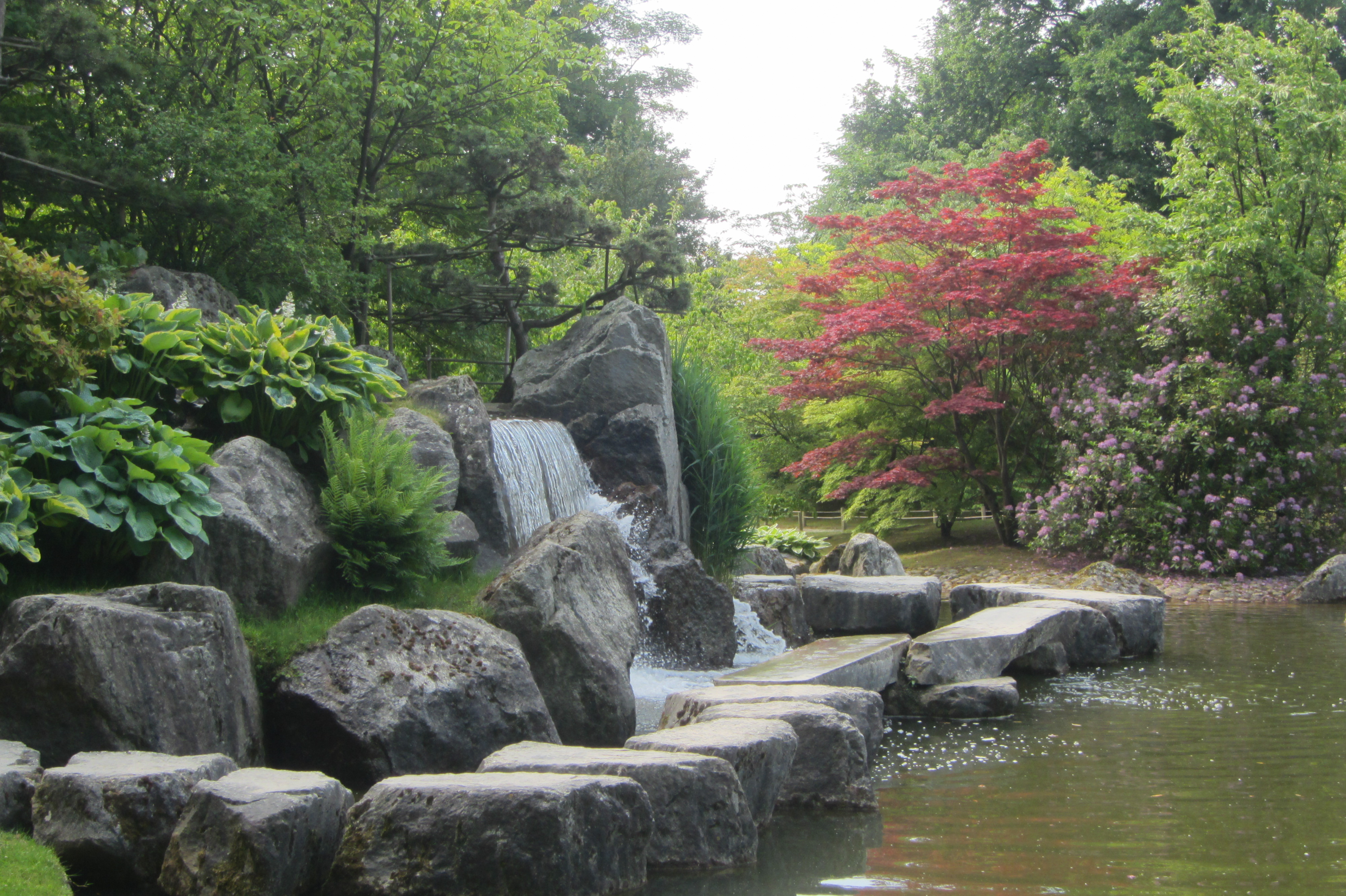
Waterfall

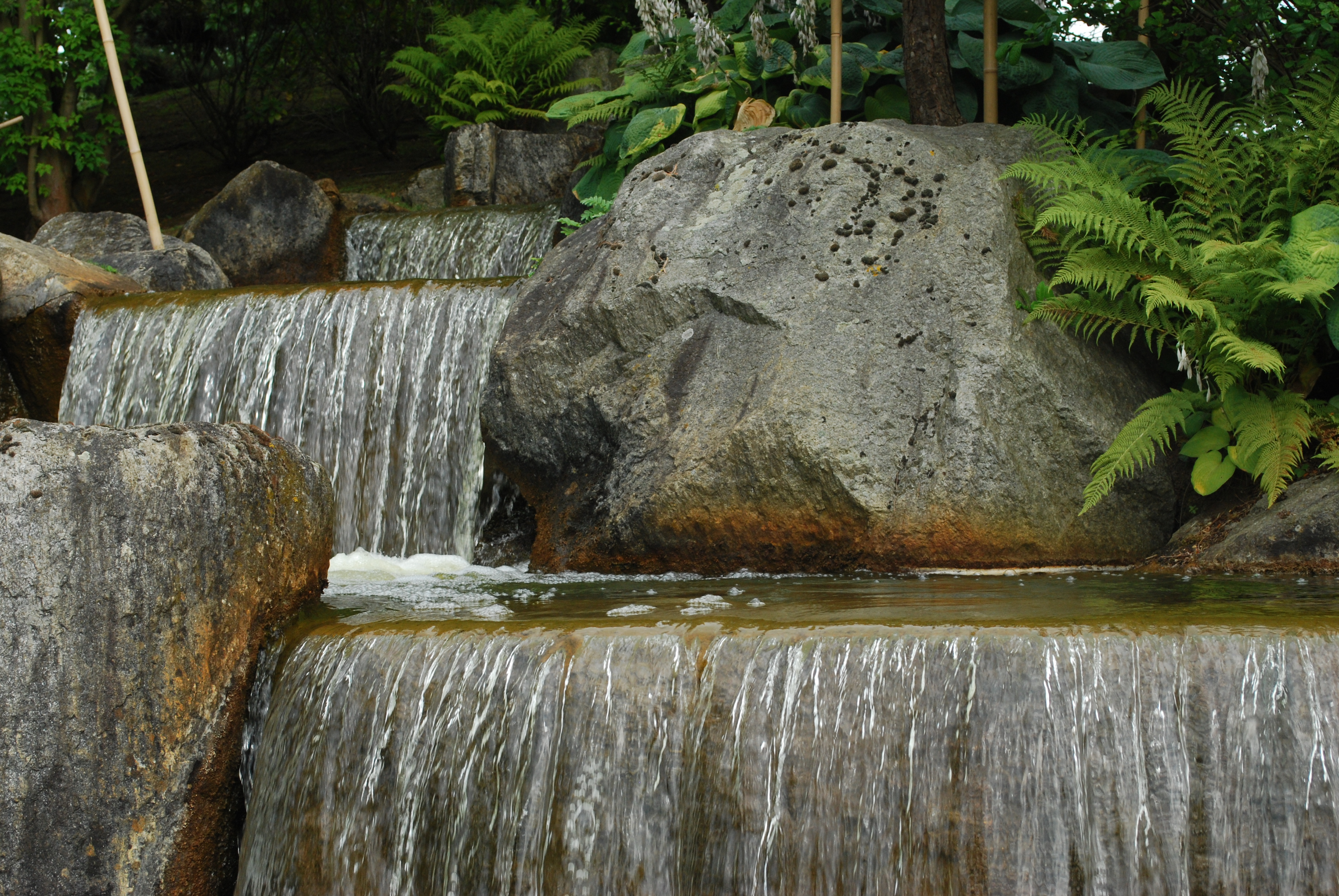
Waterfall 2

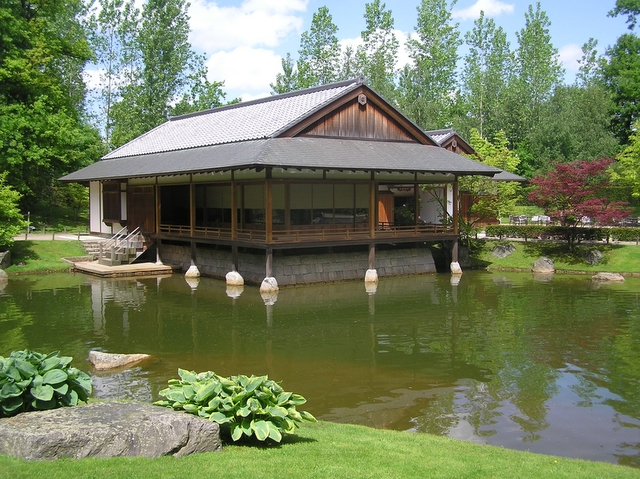
The Tea House

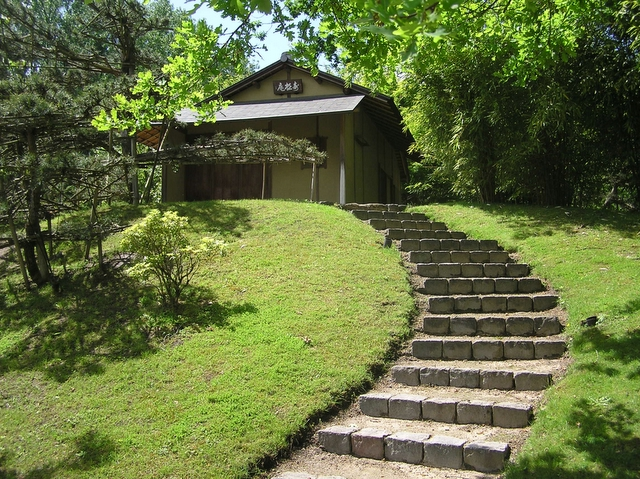
Hill with traditional Japanese building

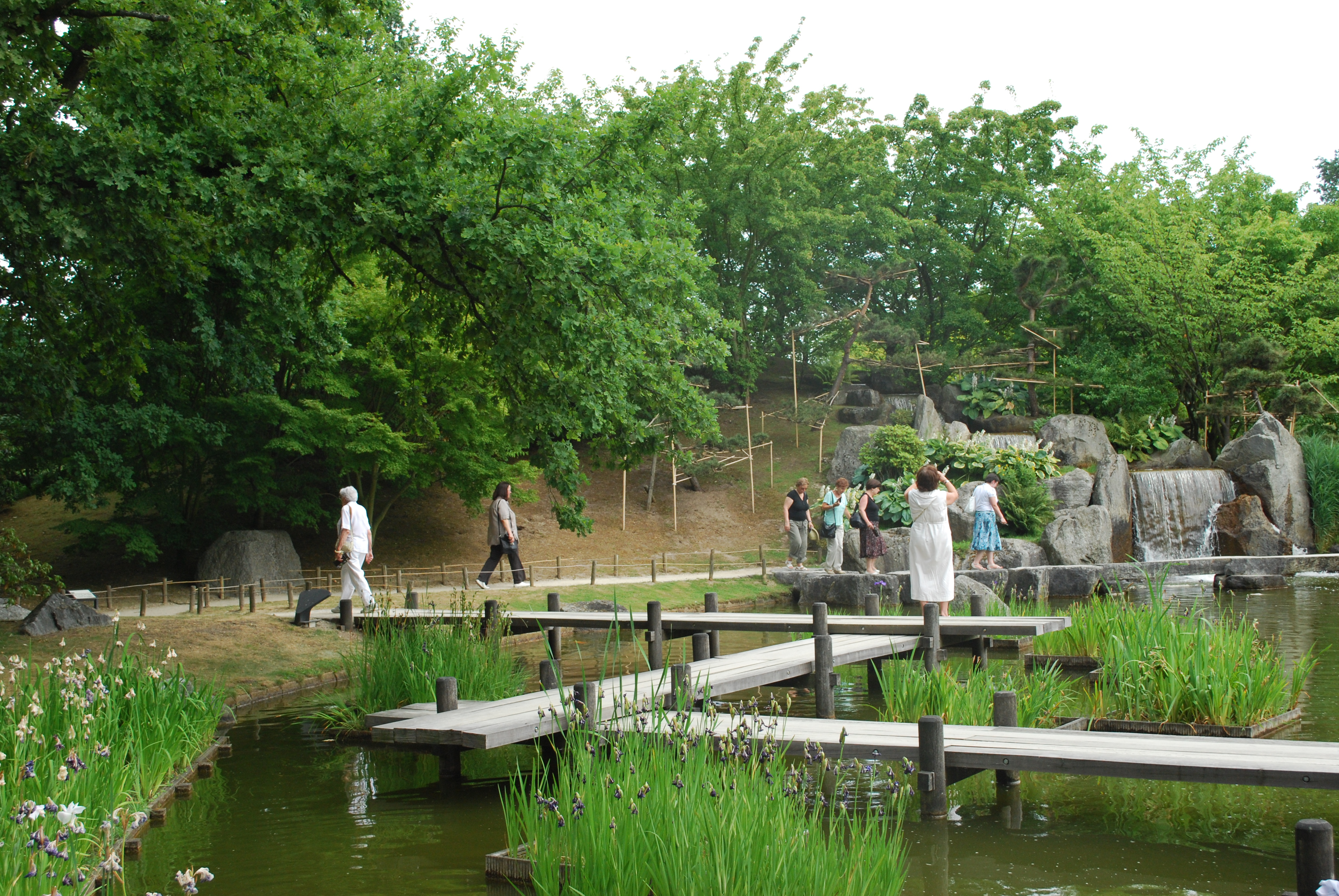
Yatsuhashi bridges

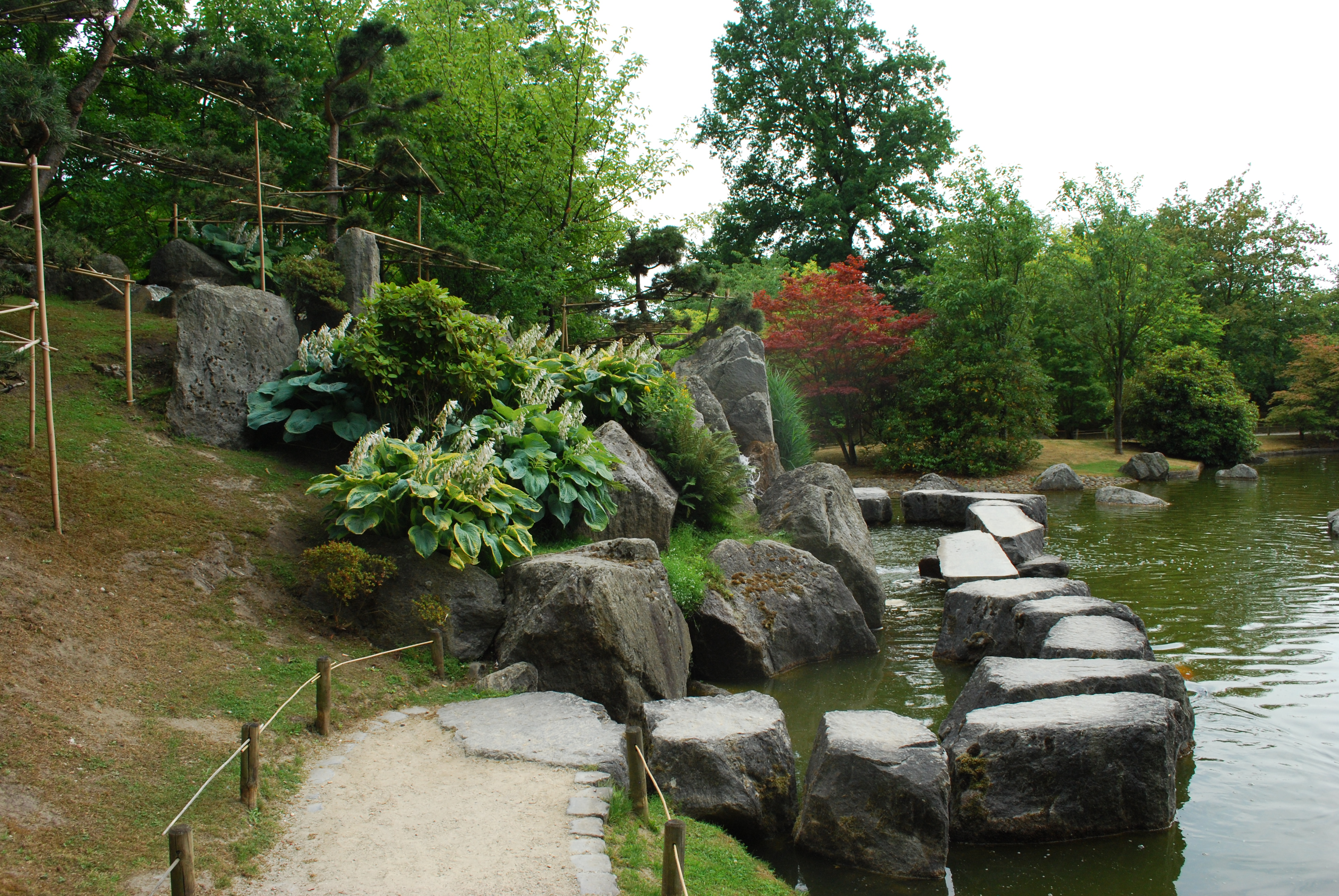
Sawatari-ishi, stepping stones over water

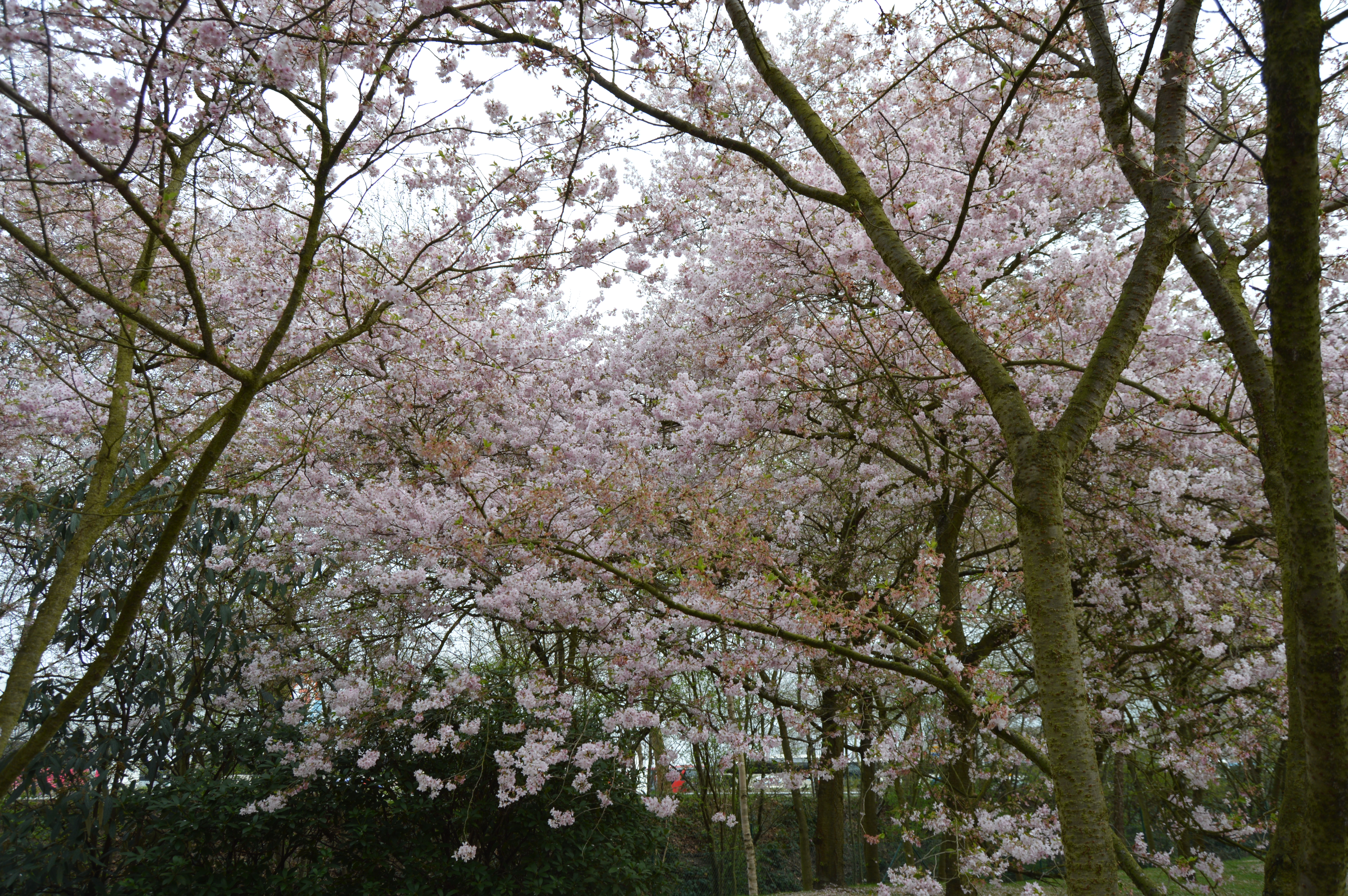
Flowering cherry blossom (sakura)
