= David Simon, Baron Simon of Highbury =

British businessman (born 1939)

The Right Honourable The Lord Simon of Highbury CBE
- Born: David Alec Gwyn Simon; 24 July 1939 (age 87); London, England
- Education: Christ's Hospital; University of Cambridge
- Spouses: Hanne Mohn (m. 1964; div. 1987) Sarah Roderick Smith (m. 1992)

Member of the House of Lords
- Lord Temporal
- Life peerage 16 May 1997 – 9 June 2017

10th Chairman of British Petroleum
- In office 1995–1997
- Preceded by: John Baring
- Succeeded by: Peter Sutherland

David Alec Gwyn Simon, Baron Simon of Highbury (born 24 July 1939) is a British businessman.

Simon was educated at Christ's Hospital in Horsham, West Sussex. He studied at Gonville and Caius College, Cambridge, graduating in 1961, and joined British Petroleum as a management trainee, becoming chief executive of BP Oil International in 1982, managing director of BP in 1985, chief executive from 1992 to 1995 and chairman from 1995 to 1997.

In the early years of his career he spent some time at the elite business school INSEAD. He became Advisor to Unilever and was Chairman of the Belgo-British Conference in 2004.

When Labour won the 1997 elections, he was appointed Minister for Trade and Competitiveness in Europe. Simon had been an industrialist for many years.

Simon was appointed a Commander of the Order of the British Empire (CBE) in the 1991 New Year Honours and knighted in 1995. He was created a life peer as Baron Simon of Highbury, of Canonbury in the London Borough of Islington on 16 May 1997.

He was conferred as an Honorary Senior Fellow of Regent's University London on 26 June 2014.

He retired from the House of Lords on 9 June 2017.

Business positions
Preceded by Robert Horton	Chief Executive of BP; 1992–1995	Succeeded by John Browne
Orders of precedence in the United Kingdom
Preceded by The Lord Falconer of Thoroton	Gentlemen; Baron Simon of Highbury	Followed by The Lord Hardie
