= Odette De Wynter =

Belgium's first woman notary

- Born: 18 July 1927; Belgium
- Died: 14 September 1998 (aged 71); Brussels, Belgium

Odette De Wynter (18 July 1927 – 14 September 1998) was the first woman to be a notary in Belgium.

== Biography ==
Odette De Wynter was born on 18 July 1927 in Brussels. She was the only daughter of the feminist Odette Prayé and Jean De Wynter. De Wynter studied at the Université libre de Bruxelles, graduating in 1950. In 1950, Belgian women were finally granted the right to work as notaries and in 1955, De Wynter was appointed by royal decree in Auderghem.

De Wynter became the administrator and founder of the European Institute for Research and Studies of Notaries (IRENE), as well as vice-president of "Solidarité, Groupement Social Féminin" and "Solidarité familial", a service created by her mother to help families and seniors.

De Wynter died in Brussels in 1998.
