= Belgium–Japan relations =

- Belgium: Japan

Belgium–Japan relations are the bilateral relations between Belgium and Japan. Belgium has an embassy in Tokyo. Japan has an embassy in Brussels.

== First official relations (1866–1893) ==
On 1 August 1866, Japan and Belgium signed the Japan-Belgium Treaty of Amity, Commerce, and Navigation. On the Belgian side, it was negotiated and signed by August t'Kint de Roodenbeek, the first Belgian diplomat to visit Japan after the country opened up in 1859. On the basis of this bilateral treaty, a Belgian vice consulate was established in Yokohama on 28 March 1867, headed by the Dutch businessman Maurice Lejeune. In the late 1860s, Belgium was represented by the Dutch minister-resident Dirk de Graeff van Polsbroek, who was also able to negotiate bilateral trade treaties with Japan.

== From the Sino-Japanese War to World War II ==
The new minister resident of the King of the Belgians to Japan, Baron Albert d'Anethan, arrived in Yokohama in October 1893. He moved the Belgian legation to Tokyo in November of that same year. In 1894, d’Anethan was promoted to the rank of envoy extraordinary and minister plenipotentiary. By 1904, he was dean of the diplomatic corps in Tokyo, till his death in Tokyo on July 25, 1910. His grave is located in the Zoshigaya Cemetery in Tokyo.

Albert d’Anethan served for 17 years in Japan, with the exception of home leaves from March 1897 till December 1897, from December 1901 till November 1902, from August 1906 till March 1907, and from March 1909 till January 1910. His mandate in Tokyo coincided with the first Sino-Japanese War (1894–1895) and the Russo-Japanese War (1904–1905).

Minister resident Georges della Faille de Leverghem succeeded Albert d’Anethan in Tokyo. He arrived in Japan in April 1911, and was promoted to envoy extraordinary and minister plenipotentiary in 1914. He remained in office in Tokyo till May 1919. His term of office coincided with the World War I (1914–1918).

In December 1920, Albert de Bassompierre was assigned Belgian minister extraordinary and plenipotentiary to Tokyo, where he arrived in May 1921. He stayed in Japan till February 1939. Due to the mutual elevation of the diplomatic status between Belgium and Japan, Bassompierre became the first Belgian diplomat in Japan with the rank of ambassador extraordinary and plenipotentiary (June 1922).

Bassompierre experienced the Great Kanto earthquake on 1 September 1923, and was involved in the Belgian relief effort for Japan. Bassompierre also witnessed the rise of Japanese militarism during his tenure. As a foreign diplomat in Japan, he was confronted with incidents such as the murder of the Japanese prime minister Hara Takashi in November 1921, the Manchurian Incident in 1931 and the establishment of the Manchukuo in 1932, the May 15 Incident in 1932, and the February 26 Incident in 1936.

Albert de Bassompierre was succeeded as Belgian ambassador extraordinary and plenipotentiary to Japan by Pierre Attilio Forthomme in November 1939. Forthomme's term in office was cut short by the suspension of diplomatic relations between Belgium and Japan in December 1941, as a consequence of Japan entering World War II through its surprise attack on Pearl Harbor.

== After World War II ==
After the surrender of Japan on 2 September 1945, the Supreme Commander of the Allied Powers (SCAP) took over Japanese sovereignty till April 1952. As a consequence, the Belgian diplomatic mission in Japan had to be accredited to the SCAP. Baron Guy Daufresne de la Chevalerie became the Belgian military representative in Tokyo in October 1946. His mandate would last till April 1952, when the SCAP ceased to exist as a result of the Treaty of San Francisco. One of the main tasks of Daufresne de la Chevalerie was to restore the commercial relations between Belgium and Japan. His efforts led to the 1949 and 1950 commercial agreements between the two countries.

In November 1952, G. de Schoutheete de Tervarent became Belgian ambassador extraordinary and plenipotentiary in Japan till April 1956. He was succeeded by Raymond Herremans (September 1956 - July 1959) and E. du Bois in October 1959. During the tenures of Herremans and du Bois, Japan and Belgium prepared the legal framework for the further growth of their economic relations, leading to the Benelux-Japan Commercial Agreement of 8 October 1960 and an additional protocol of 30 April 1963. Both ambassadors were also involved in the preparation and construction of a new Belgian embassy compound in Tokyo, which opened its doors in 1960.

Albert Hupperts took up the post of Belgian ambassador extraordinary and plenipotentiary in Japan in December 1962. He was succeeded by Fredegand Cogels in December 1968, but Hupperts resumed the post in May 1972. During their terms as ambassadors, Japan took center stage with the 1964 Summer Olympics in Tokyo and the World Expo in Osaka (1970). During the 1970s and 1980s, the Belgian ambassadors R. Dooreman (1974–77), Herman Dehennin (1978–1981), J. Verwilghen (1981–85), and Marcel Depasse (1985–88) witnessed the strong growth of the Japanese economy, despite two oil shocks in the 1970s.

By the time Baron Patrick Nothomb started his 9-year term of office in 1988, Japan had established itself as the world's second-largest economy. Japan's economic powerhouse resulted in a growing trade imbalance with Belgium and a stream of Japanese investment into Belgium. This trend, with some ups and downs, basically remained the same during the tenures of the next Belgian ambassadors, Gustaaf Dierckx (1997–2002), Jean-Francois Branders (2002–2006), and Johan Maricou (born 2006), even though the bubble economy in Japan was followed by the Lost Decade in the 1990s.

Nothomb's term was marked by the death of two monarchs: Emperor Hirohito of Japan died in 1989, and King Baudouin of Belgium in 1993. The reign of both monarchs was exceptionally long, and their succession by Emperor Akihito and King Albert II meant a new era in the monarchal relations between Belgium and Japan. The culture festivity Europalia Japan brought Japanese culture en masse to Belgium in 1989 and was visited by 1.6 million people.

During the tenure of Dierckx the 2002 FIFA World Cup took place jointly in Japan and Korea (June 2002). On 1 December 2001 the first match of the Japanese national soccer team was against Belgium. The Japanese press kept its focus on Belgium for 7 months, resulting in an unexpected free promotion platform favouring the relations between the two countries.

During Jean-François Branders’ term Belgium participated to the World Expo 2005 in Aichi from March to September 2005, and Johan Maricou had to oversee the construction of a new embassy building in Tokyo (2007–2009). .

== See also ==
- Foreign relations of Belgium
- Foreign relations of Japan
- Japanese people in Belgium
