= Huygens =

Huygens (also Huijgens, Huigens, Huijgen/Huygen, or Huigen) is a Dutch patronymic surname, meaning "son of Hugo". Most references to "Huygens" are to the polymath Christiaan Huygens. Notable people with the surname include:

- Jan Huygen (1563–1611), Dutch voyager and historian
- Constantijn Huygens (1596–1687), Dutch poet, diplomat, scholar and composer
- Constantijn Huygens, Jr. (1628–1697), Dutch statesman, soldier, and telescope maker, son of Constantijn Huygens
- Christiaan Huygens (1629–1695), Dutch mathematician, physicist and astronomer, son of Constantijn Huygens
- Lodewijck Huygens (1631–1699), Dutch diplomat, the third son of Constantijn Huygens
- Cornélie Huygens (1848–1902), Dutch writer, social democrat and feminist
- Léon Huygens (1876–1918), Belgian painter
- Jan Huijgen (1888–1964), Dutch speedwalker
- Christiaan Huijgens (1897–1963), Dutch long-distance runner
- Wil Huygen (1922–2009), Dutch children's and fantasy writer, e.g. of Gnomes

== Named after Constantijn Sr ==
- Constantijn Huygens Prize, Dutch literary award
- Huygens Institute for Dutch History

== Named after Christiaan Huygens ==
Astronomy:

- Cassini–Huygens, mission to Saturn and Titan
  - Huygens (spacecraft), the probe of above mission which landed on Saturn's moon Titan in 2005
- 2801 Huygens, an asteroid
- Huygens (crater), a Martian crater
- Mons Huygens, a mountain of Earth's Moon
- Huygens Gap, main gap in the rings of Saturn

Physics:

- Huygens's principle regarding wave propagation
- Huygens's law of the pendulum regarding pendulums
- Huygens–Steiner theorem regarding moment of inertia

Mathematics and games:

- Huygens's tritone, a musical interval
- Huygens lemniscate, a figure eight curve

Microscopes:

- Huygens eyepiece, first compound eye piece
