= Japanese Garden of Ostend =

Garden in Ostend, Belgium

Japanese Garden (Shin Kai Tei)
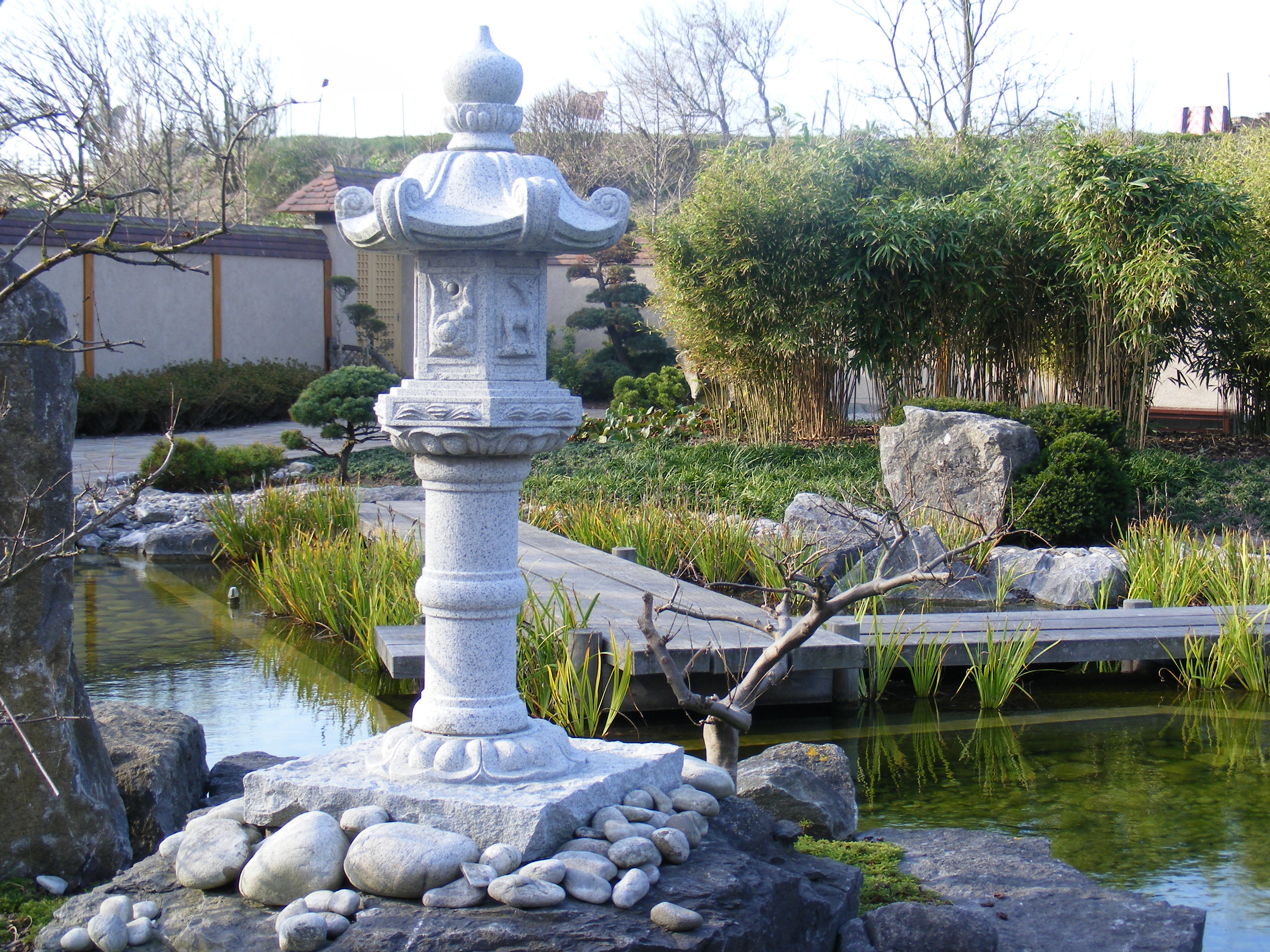
- The Japanese Garden in 2007
- Interactive map of Japanese Garden (Shin Kai Tei)
- Type: Japanese garden
- Location: Koning Astridlaan 1, Ostend, Belgium
- Coordinates: 51°13′37″N 2°54′23″E
- Area: 0.25 hectares (0.62 acres)
- Status: Open year round

The Japanese Garden of Ostend (Dutch: Japanse tuin van Oostende) or Shin Kai Tei is a park in the Belgian city of Ostend. The garden was designed by Japanese architect Takashi Sawano. It is named Shin Kai Tei, which means Deep Sea Garden in Japanese. It was opened in 2001 by Prince Philippe of Belgium.

== History ==
It was built in the kaiyū-shiki-teien style. The garden is located near Ostend's city center and thus near the North Sea. It was designed by Japanese architect Takashi Sawano. The garden includes a pond and waterfalls, walking paths, benches, a gazebo, and water plants. The pond features small fish and koi carp. It was opened by Prince Philippe of Belgium (later crowned King of the Belgians) in 2001. The garden extends for over 2500 square meters.

The garden was named Shin Kai Tei, meaning "deep sea garden" (shin meaning "deep", "profound", "wise"; kai meaning "ocean", "sea"; and tei meaning "garden" as well as "sanctuary").

The garden was opened on 20 July 2001, with a traditional Shinto ceremony, which was attended by Prince Philippe. The garden cost about 25 million francs.

== Gallery ==
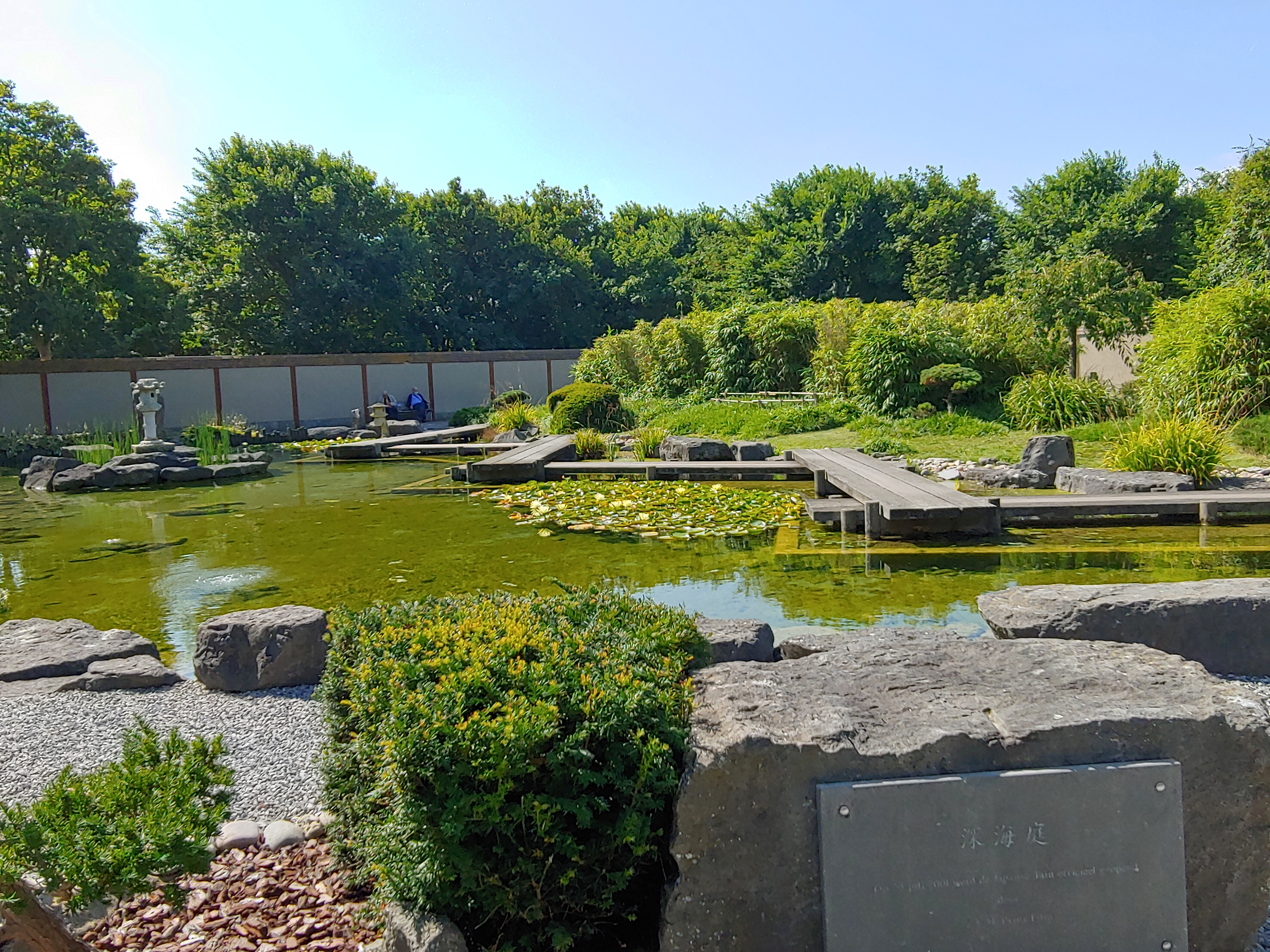
View of the pond and yatsuhashi bridges

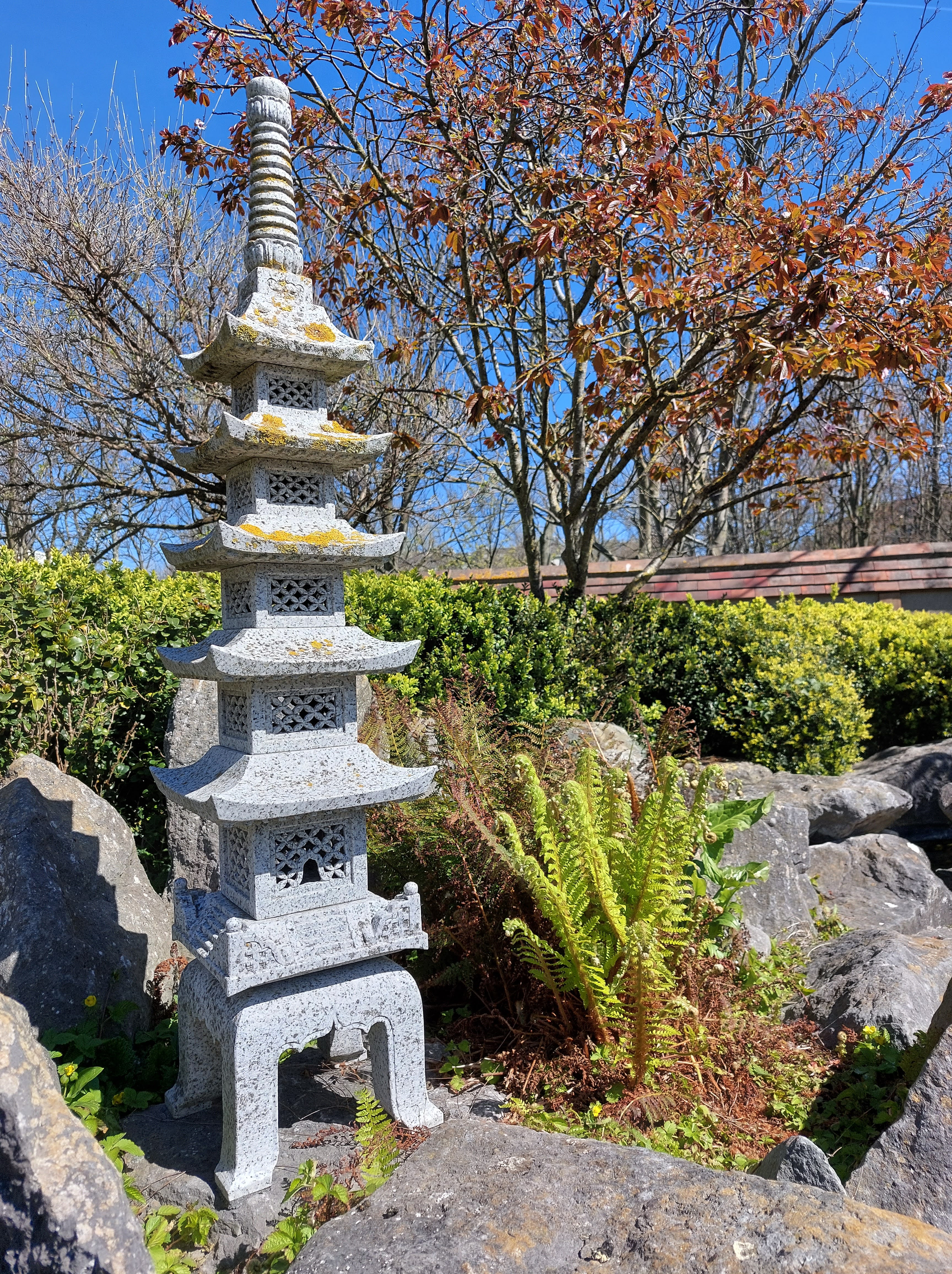
Stone pagoda

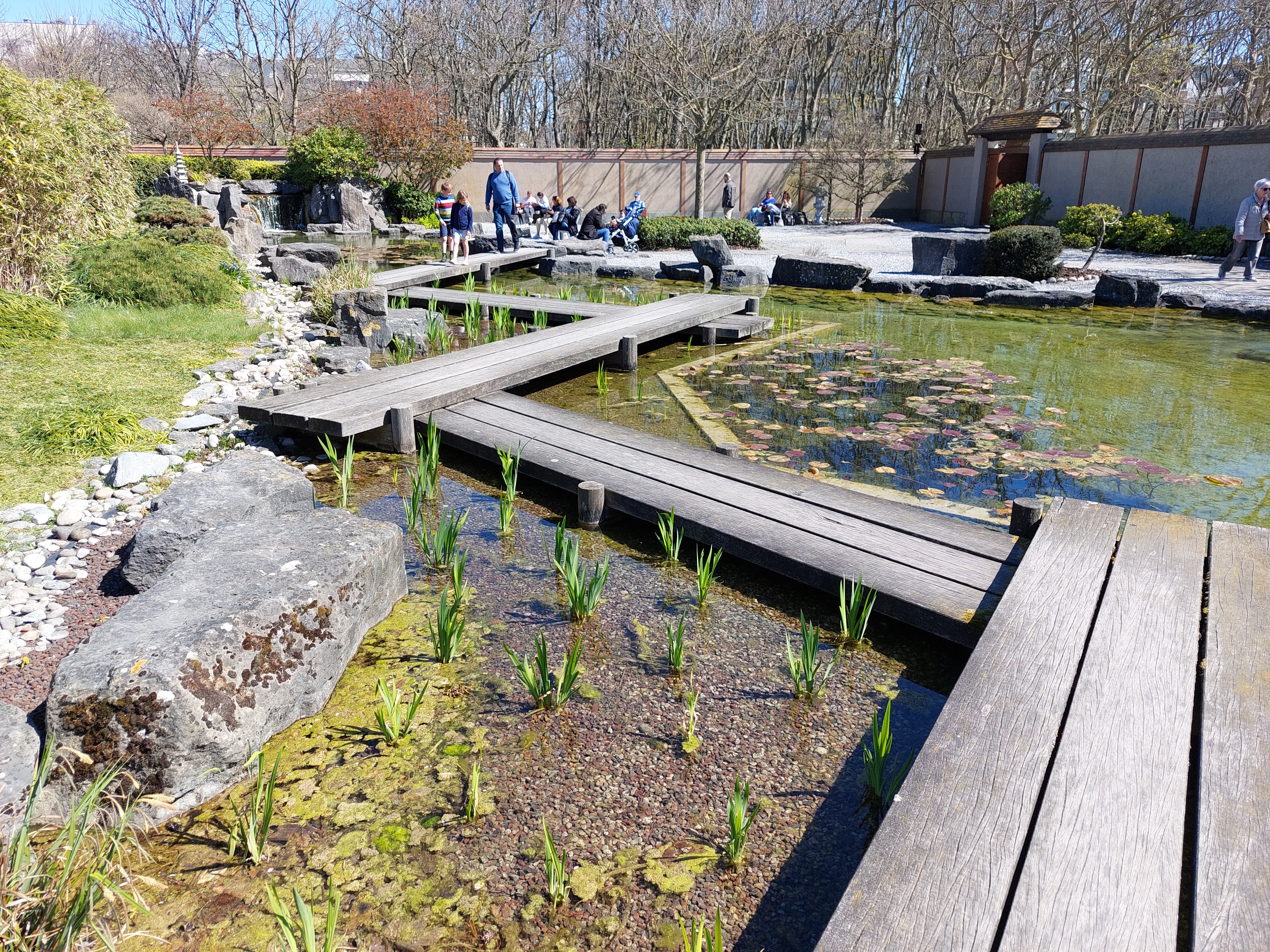
Yatsuhashi bridges

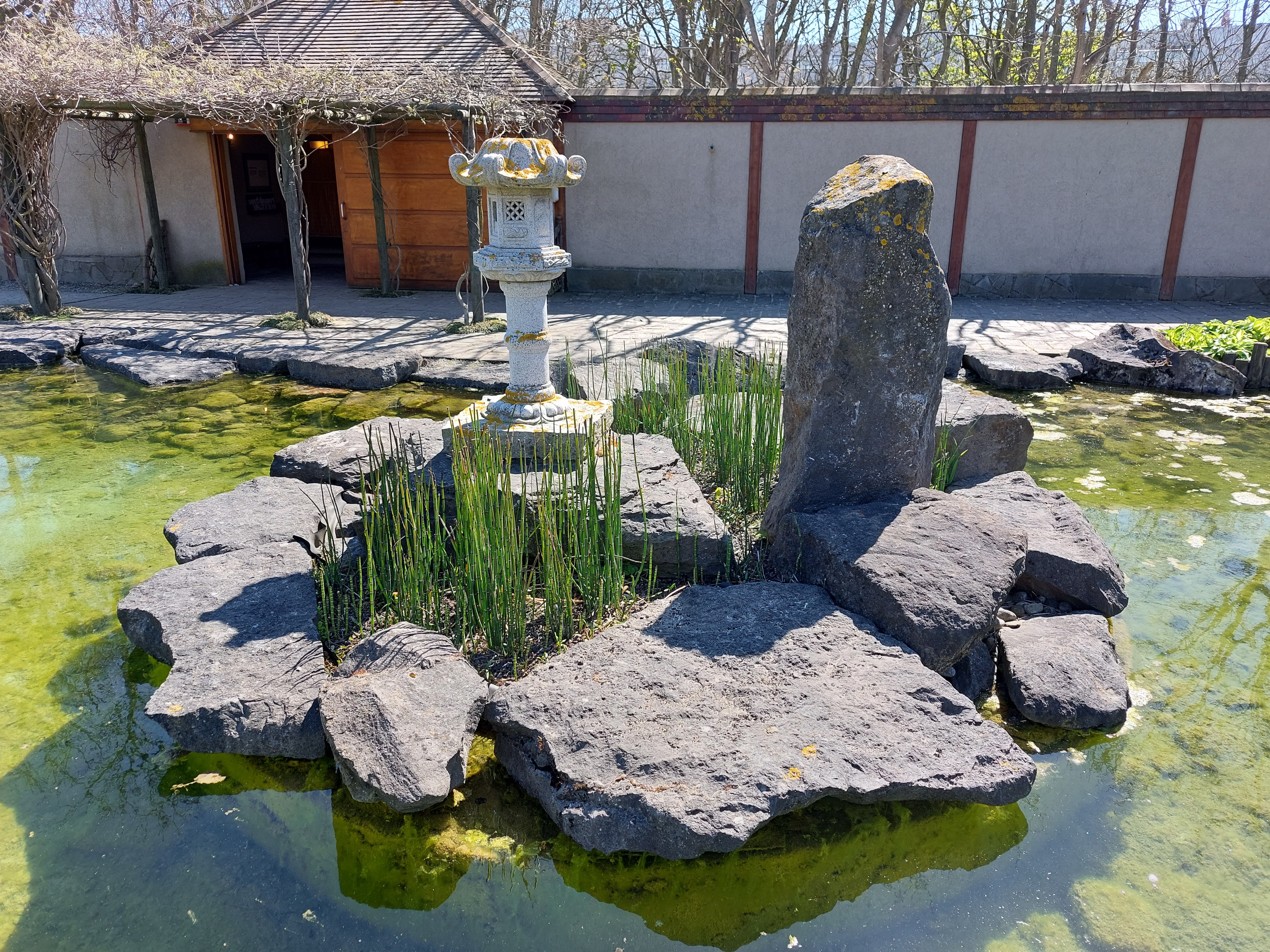
Pedestal lantern and rocks
