= Athénée Royal d'Auderghem =

School in Brussels, Belgium

Information
- School type: Secondary school
- Language: French
- Affiliation: French Community of Belgium
- Website: www.arauderghem.be

The Athénée Royal d'Auderghem (ARA) is a French-language secondary school in Brussels, Belgium, supported by the French Community of Belgium. It has three campuses:

- Section fondamentale in Auderghem
- Section secondaire Implantation Auderghem
- Implantation La Brise in Watermael-Boitsfort
