= Belgo-British Conference =

The Belgo-British Conference is a recurring conference organised by the Belgian Federal Public Service Foreign Affairs, the British Foreign, Commonwealth and Development Office, the Egmont Institute and the British Council.

The aim of the conference is to enrich bilateral relations by bringing together politicians, business people, academics, journalists, and other opinion-formers to debate themes of common and crucial importance to Belgium and the United Kingdom.

== History ==
The Belgo-British Conference was first held in 2000, having been an idea discussed by Belgian Prime Minister Guy Verhofstadt and British Prime Minister Tony Blair, when they met for the first time in Downing Street in November 1999.

The first edition took place in Bruges in 2000. The location of the conference would alternate annually between the United Kingdom and Belgium and takes place under the Chatham House Rule. After the fifteenth edition in 2014, the conference was stopped being held until it was reinvigorated in 2022.

The Belgo-British Conference is currently chaired by Sir Robin Niblett (Director and Chief Executive of Chatham House) and Ambassador Johan Verbeke (former Belgian Ambassador to the UK), who preside over a board which agrees the theme of the conference. Previous chairs include Sir Stephen Wall, Ambassador Lode Willems, André Villeneuve, Count Georges Jacobs de Hagen, Baron Paul Buysse and Lord Simon of Highbury.

== Editions ==
Year	Date	Location	Theme
2000	19–21 October	(Belgium) Bruges	None
2001	25–26 October	(United Kingdom) London	None
2002	3–5 October	(Belgium) Val-Duchesse Castle, Brussels	None
2003	16–18 October	(United Kingdom) Royal Society, Edinburgh	Changing Europe in a Changing World
2004	25–27 November	(Belgium) Royal Theatre, Namur	Ensuring Europe's Prosperity – Building Bridges
2005	20–22 October	(United Kingdom) Locarno Rooms, London	2020 – A new horizon for Europe
2006	16–17 October	(Belgium) Val-Duchesse Castle, Brussels	Globalisation and the Citizen
2007	13–14 November	(United Kingdom) Lancaster House, London	Bridges Across The Channel
2008	12–13 November	(Belgium) Egmont Palace, Brussels	Natural Resources: Challenges and Opportunities
2009	18–19 November	(United Kingdom) British Council, London	Innovating our Way out of the Crisis
2010	19–20 October	(Belgium) Egmont Palace, Brussels	Player or Spectator? Europe in Tomorrow's World
2011	17–18 October	(United Kingdom) Lancaster House, London	Employment and Growth
2012	8–9 November	(Belgium) Egmont Palace, Brussels	Two Countries, How many Europes? A Belgo-British Dialogue
2013	10–11 October	(United Kingdom) Lancaster House, London	History and Reconciliation: Engaging a New Generation
2014	20–21 November	(Belgium) Egmont Palace, Brussels	Creation and Business
2022	1 July	(United Kingdom) Locarno Rooms, London	The UK-Belgium Relationship in a Changing Geopolitical Context
