= Léon Huygens =

Belgian painter (1876–1919)

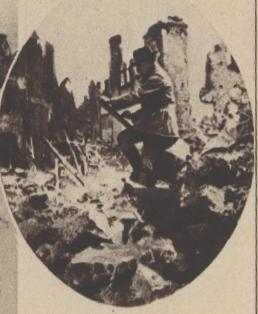
Leon Huygens sketching in the ruins of Nieuwpoort during the First World War.

Léon Huygens (1876–1919) was a Belgian painter.

== Early life and career ==
Huygens was born in Auderghem, Brussels, and attended the Académie Royale des Beaux-Arts in Brussels. He specialised in landscapes, particularly of the Sonian Forest to the south of Auderghem and the coast at Nieuwpoort.

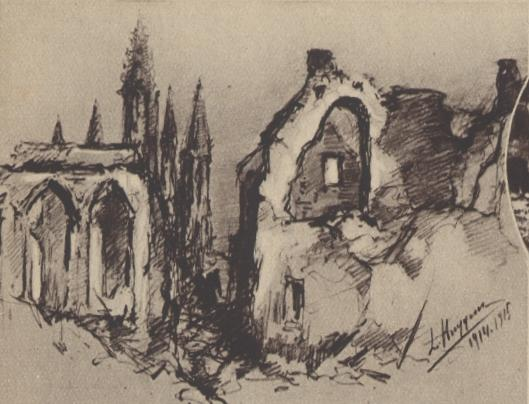
Sketch of Nieuwpoort during the First World War.

== Later life and death ==
He volunteered for the Belgian army during the First World War, and was assigned as a war artist. He died in Paris in 1919.
