= Japanese School of Brussels =

School in Brussels, Belgium

The Japanese School of Brussels
- ブラッセル日本人学校

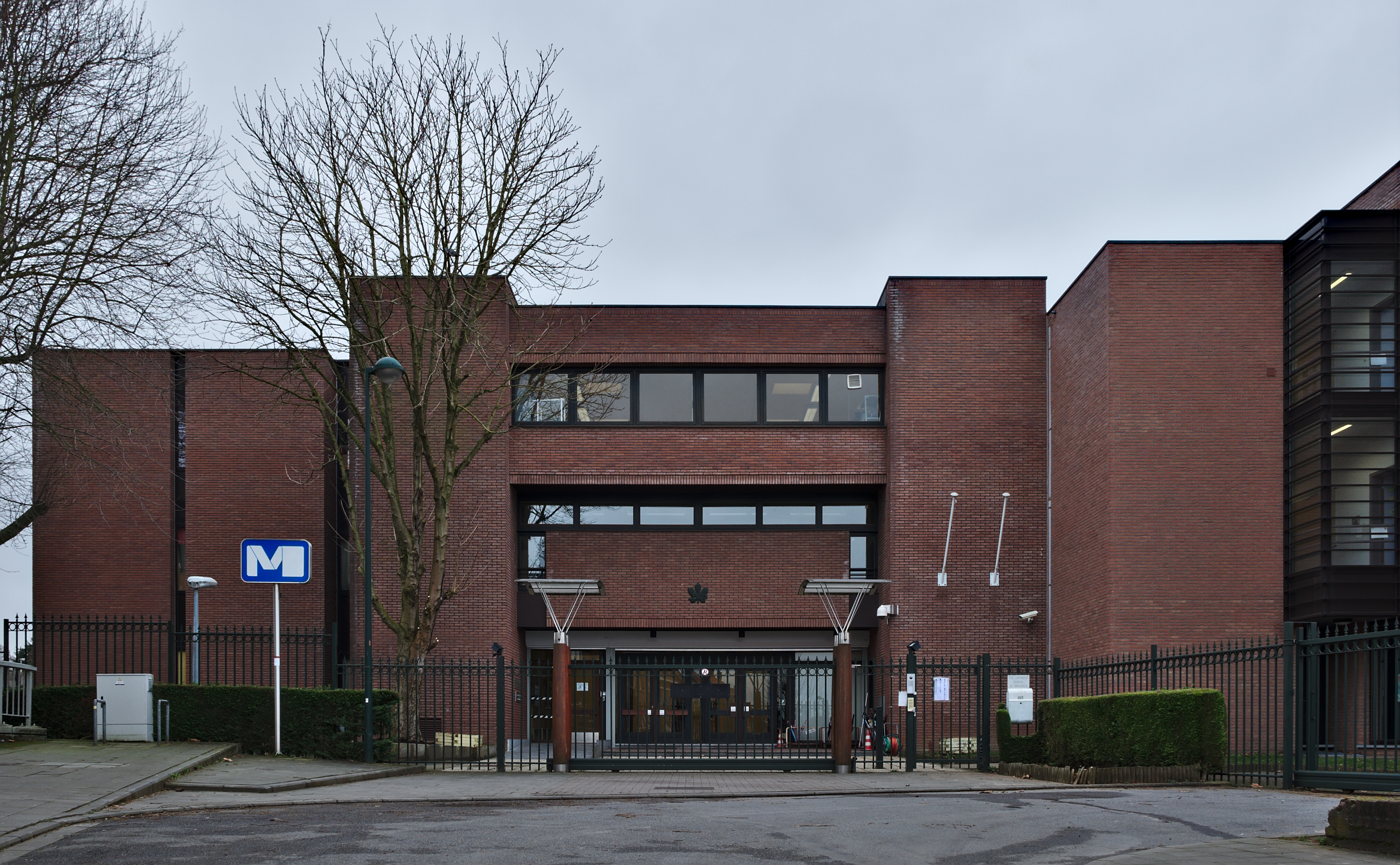

Location
- Avenue des Meuniers 133, 1160 Auderghem, Brussels, Belgium; Auderghem; Belgium; 50.8157°N 4.4096°E

Information
- Type: Japanese international school
- Established: 1979; 47 years ago
- Website: japanese-school-brussels.be

The Japanese School of Brussels a.s.b.l. (ブラッセル日本人学校, Burasseru Nihonjin Gakkō; JSB) is a Japanese international school in the municipality of Auderghem in Brussels, Belgium. The school serves elementary and junior high school levels. It is Belgium's only Japanese international school. The Japanese Supplementary School of Brussels (ブラッセル日本人学校補習校, Burasseru Nihonjin gakkō hoshūkō), a supplementary school operated on Saturdays, is held on the premises of the JSB.

The presence of the school has drawn Japanese families with school-aged children to the area around the school. Marie Conte-Helm, author of The Japanese and Europe: Economic and Cultural Encounters, wrote that the school "acts as a focal point for all local Japanese." Chin Ling Pang (Chinese: 彭靜蓮; pinyin: Péng Jìnglián), the author of Negotiating Identity in Contemporary Japan: The Case of Kikokushijo, wrote that the Japanese School of Brussels "functions as a microcosm of the Japanese community in Brussels."

As of 2000 the school's funding comes from Japanese companies and the Ministry of Education of Japan (Monbusho) in an equal proportion, along with tuition fees paid by parents of Saturday school pupils. Revenue in 2019–2020 school year was €2,085,580 with expenses being €1,721,896.

== History ==
A Japanese Saturday school opened in 1974. The Brussels Nihonjinkai took control of a facility in Auderghem in 1979 and founded the school. The school opened in April 1979.

== Programme and curriculum ==
The Japanese Ministry of Education sends teachers to the school; as of 1998 20 teachers originated from Japan.

In addition the school has a curriculum that is used in schools in Japan. The school receives schoolbooks mailed from Japan. The students take mathematics, standard history, comparative history, French, English, geography, calligraphy, art, and home economics. The geography and standard history courses are centred on Japan. The home economics course includes childcare, gardening, sewing, food preparation, and crafts.

The Saturday school offers courses in Japanese and mathematics.

== Student body ==
In 1995 the day school had 323 students, including 252 in elementary school and 71 in junior high school. Of the total number of students, 146 were males and 177 were females. In 1998 there were 276 students. In 2005 the school had 320 day students; two of them were Americans learning Japanese while the remainder were Japanese. In 2008 the school had 399 students; this was its peak enrollment. In 2013 the day school had 295 students and the Saturday school had 279 students in 2021. That year the Japanese ambassador to Belgium described the enrollment as having "decreased considerably".

As of 2000 students of the Saturday school were resident in several cities, including Brussels, Antwerp, Ostend, Valenciennes, Aachen and Maastricht. The students of the Saturday programme come from mixed and expatriate families.

As of 2005 most students return to Japan after completing their term at the JSB while some attend international schools in Brussels.

== Facility ==
The campus, inside a residential area, and in proximity to the Beaulieu Station of the Brussels Metro, houses a building that is two stories tall. It can house a maximum of 500 students. As of 2005 the school's facility had 15 classrooms, a library, a science room, a music classroom, an indoor gymnasium, and four language laboratories. In 2010 funding was provided for an expansion for the school. It was scheduled to be completed around 2013. That year the Japanese Ambassador to Belgium described the facility as "a spacious campus".

Japanese cherry trees are planted on the grounds.

== Extracurricular activities ==
The school organizes field trips to several places including the Royal Museum for Central Africa and the Centre for Fine Arts, Brussels.

== See also ==
- Japanese community of Brussels
- Belgian Japanese
