= Auderghem =

Municipality of the Brussels-Capital Region, Belgium

Auderghem: Auderghem (French); Oudergem (Dutch)
- Municipality
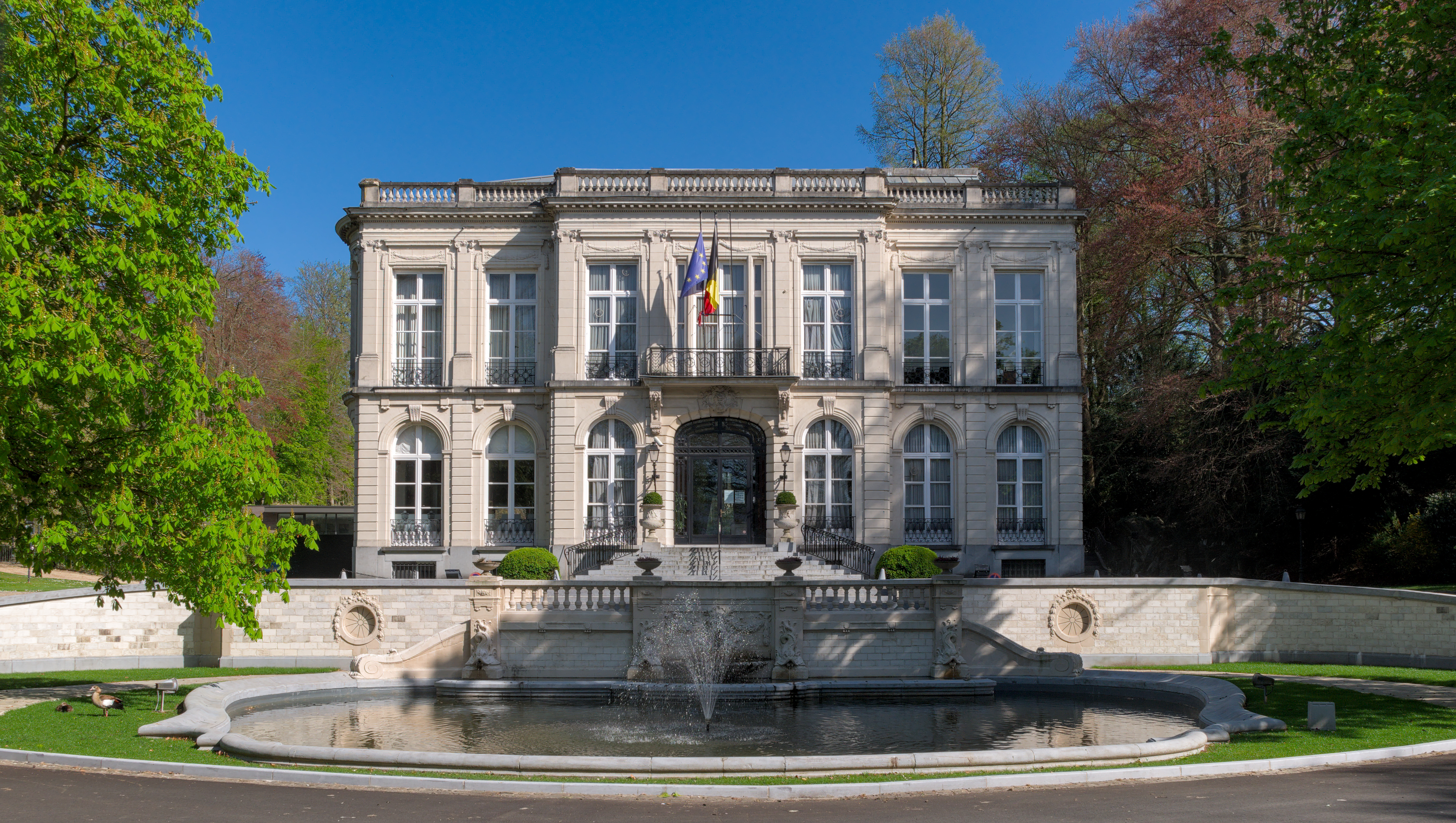
- Château Sainte-Anne

- Flag Coat of arms

- Auderghem municipality in the Brussels-Capital Region
- Interactive map of Auderghem
- Location in Belgium
- Coordinates: 50°49′00″N 04°25′34″E
- Country: Belgium
- Community: Flemish Community; French Community
- Region: Brussels-Capital
- Arrondissement: Brussels-Capital

Government
  - Mayor: Sophie de Vos (LB - DéFI)
  - Governing parties: LB (DéFI), Ecolo-Groen

Area
  - Total: 8.97 km^{2} (3.46 sq mi)

Population (2020-01-01)
  - Total: 34,404
  - Density: 3,840/km^{2} (9,930/sq mi)
- Postal codes: 1160
- NIS code: 21002
- Area codes: 02
- Website: www.auderghem.be (in French) www.oudergem.be (in Dutch)

Auderghem (French, pronounced [odœʁɡɛm]; former Dutch spelling) or Oudergem (Dutch, pronounced [ˈʌudərɣɛm]) is one of the 19 municipalities of the Brussels-Capital Region, Belgium. Located in the south-eastern part of the region, along the Woluwe valley and at the entrance to the Sonian Forest, it is bordered by Etterbeek, Ixelles, Watermael-Boitsfort, and Woluwe-Saint-Pierre, as well as the Flemish municipalities of Tervuren and Overijse. Like all municipalities in Brussels, it is officially bilingual (French–Dutch).

Despite large roads slicing through and the increasing traffic, the municipality has an environmental advantage, and it has been able to preserve a relatively important part of its natural and historic legacy: the creeks, Rouge Cloître Abbey and its art centre, the Priory of Val Duchesse, the Château of Trois-Fontaines, the Château Saint-Anne, and the Chapel of St. Anne.

== History ==
Three forest villages (Auderghem, Watermael, and Boitsfort-Bosvoorde) were one for centuries. In 1794, the soldiers of the French Revolution decided to separate these into three distinct municipalities. In 1811, Napoleon decided to reunite the three villages, by imperial decree, into a single administrative entity. However, Auderghem was withdrawn from this union by royal act, leaving Watermael-Boitsfort on its own. Thus, Auderghem became an independent municipality in 1863, with only 1,600 inhabitants.

With the construction of the rail line linking Brussels and Tervuren as well as, in 1910, the construction of the Boulevard du Souverain/Vorstlaan, modernisation came to the municipality and the population grew quickly. In 1956, Paul Henri Spaak lead the Intergovernmental Conference on the Common Market and Euratom at the Château of Val Duchesse in Auderghem, which prepared the Treaties of Rome in 1957 and the foundation of the European Economic Community and Euratom in 1958.

== Demographics ==
As of 2004, the majority of Brussels' Japanese expatriate population lives in Auderghem.

== Main sights ==
- The Priory of Val Duchesse, a gift from the Belgian King, is rarely open to the public. In 1963, Belgium's cabinet ministers met there, planting the seeds of the country's federalisation, though at conditions fiercely criticised especially in some Flemish nationalist circles.
- The Chapel of St. Anne, whose origins go back to the 12th century, is not open to the public. Decommissioned in 1843, it was sold several times. Its medieval sculptures and notable period furniture are still visible.
- Auderghem has a peaceful cemetery hidden in greenery and arranged like a park.
- The municipality also offers many green spaces.
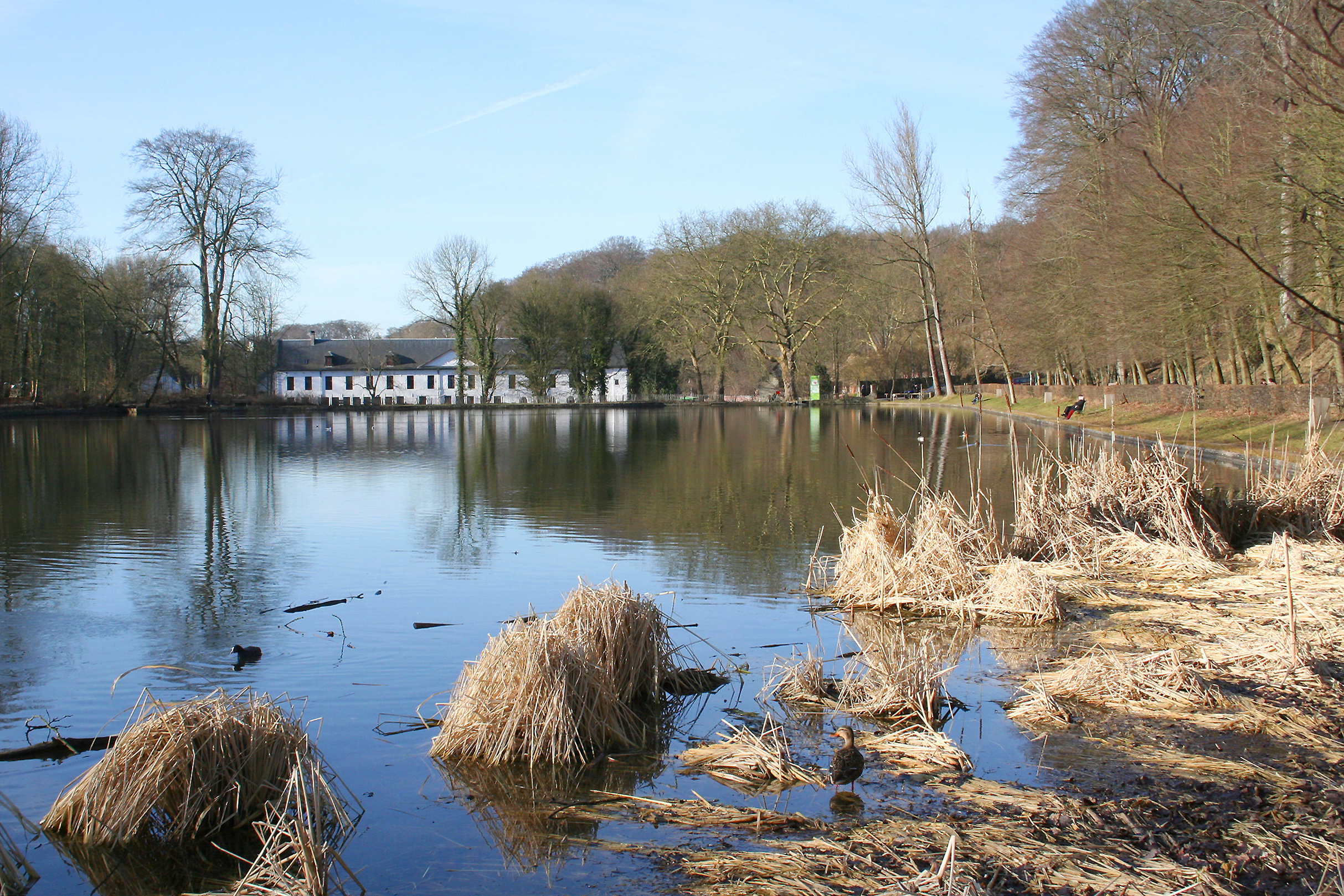
Rouge Cloître Abbey

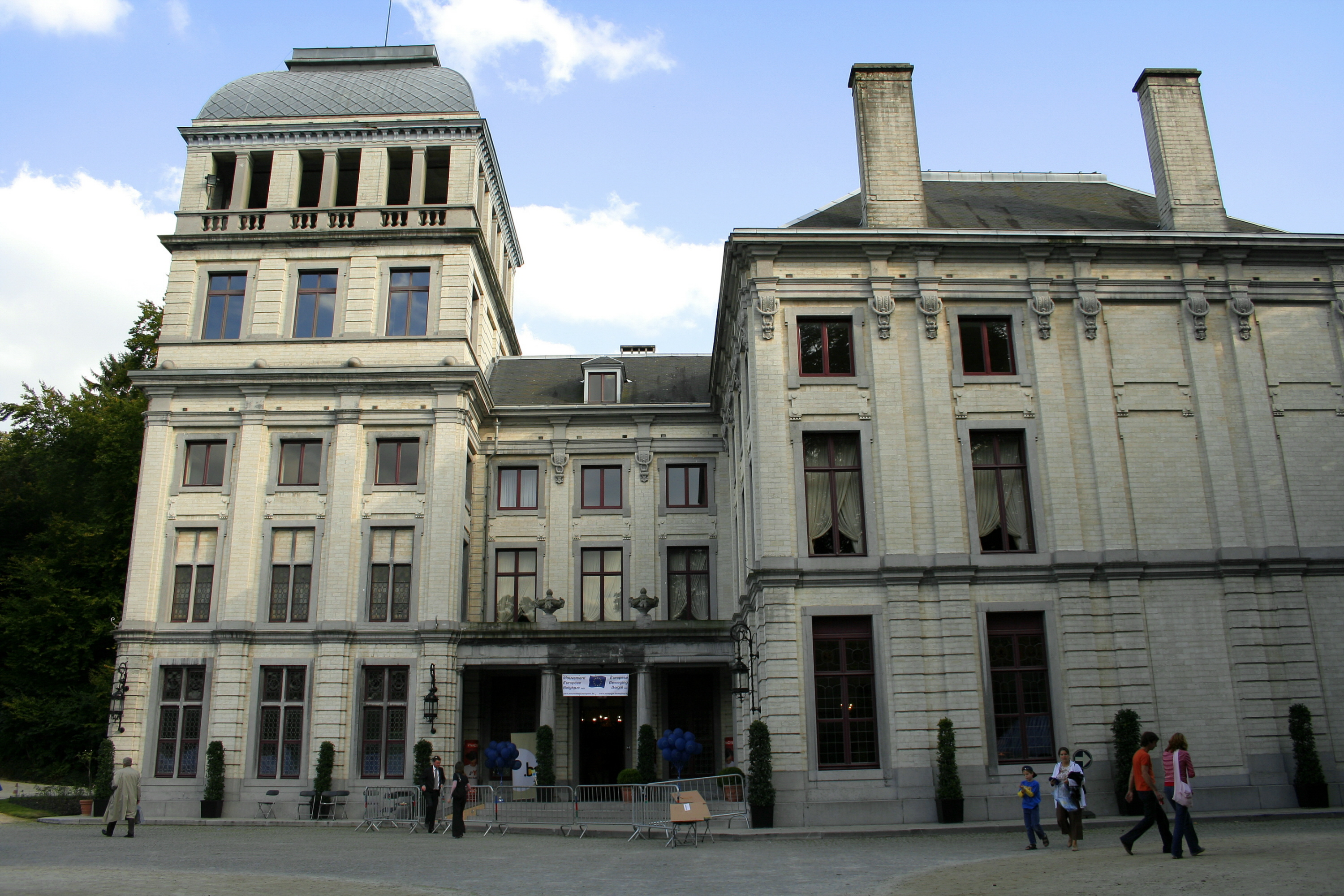
Château of Val Duchesse

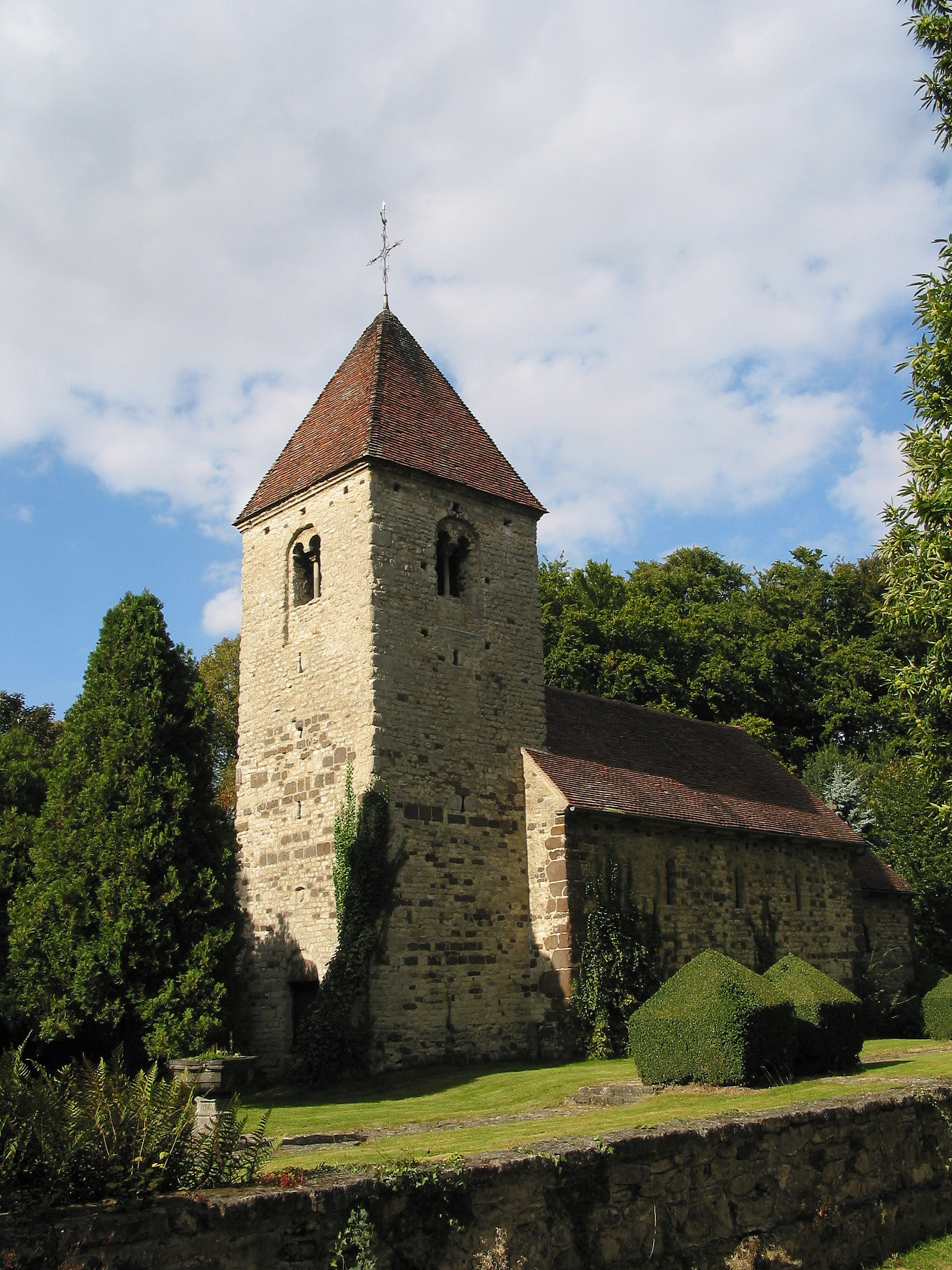
Chapel of St. Anne

== Notable inhabitants ==
- Léon Huygens (1876–1918), painter
- Marie-Thérèse Bodart (1909–1981), novelist, essayist, and playwright
- Odette De Wynter (1927–1998), first woman notary in Belgium

== Education ==
=== Public secondary schools ===
- Athénée royal d'Auderghem

=== Subsidised religious secondary schools ===
- Centre scolaire St-Adrien Val Duchesse
- Institut St-Julien Parnasse
- Ecole Sainte-Bernadette
- Institut Dominique Pire

=== Subsidised non-religious secondary schools ===
- De l'autre côté de l'école

=== Private international schools ===
- The Japanese School of Brussels
