= Eight Bridges =

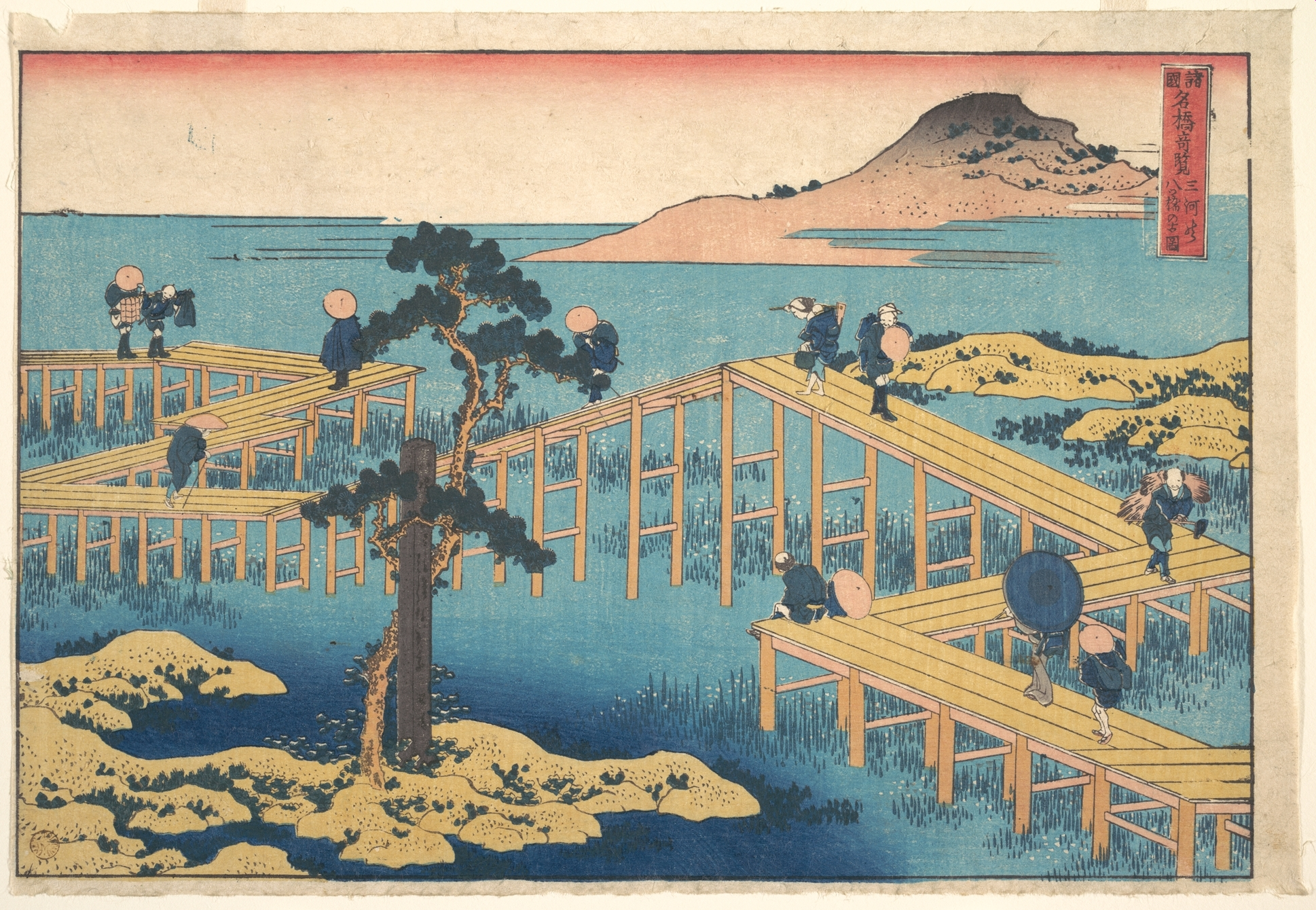
Ancient View of The Eight Bridges in Mikawa Province, from the series Remarkable Views of Bridges in Various Provinces. Katsushika Hokusai, c. 1834

The Eight Bridges (Japanese: 八橋, Hepburn: Yatsuhashi), in Japanese literature, was a historical and semi-legendary construction in Mikawa Province (modern-day Aichi Prefecture) mentioned in Japanese poetry. It was described in The Tales of Ise, a collection of poems written during the Heian period, and became a well known literary motif in Japan. Over time the bridge, which became stylised into a zig-zag shape, was incorporated into a large range of art forms: kimonos, writing boxes, screens and porcelain, ukiyo-e prints and garden landscapes. In the modern day, it can also be found as an architectural motif of Japanese-style constructions abroad.

== Literary origins ==
The Eight Bridges originates from The Tales of Ise – a collection of episodes, sometimes attributed to the poet Ariwara no Narihara (825–880), about the life of an unidentified man in the capital and his journey into Eastern Japan. In Mikawa, the man and his companions stop to rest beside the Eight Bridges which fords eight channels that run through a marsh filled with irises:

They arrived a place called Yatsuhashi, Eight Bridges, in the land of Mikawa, so named from the eight bridges spanning the streams that flowed out in all directions like the legs of a spider.

They dismounted in the shade of a tree beside this marsh to eat their dried rice cakes. Irises were blooming beautifully in the marsh, and someone suggested they compose a poem on the theme of Travel, with the first syllable of each line to spell the word for iris, ka.ki.tsu.ba.ta. He composed this:

karakomono
kitsutsu narenishi
tsuma shi areba
harubaru kinuru
tabi o shi zo omou

I have a wife
intimate and dear to me
as a long-worn robe
swathing my thoughts with love
through this far journey’s distances

There is little description of the shape of the Eight Bridges in The Tales of Ise, and it is unclear how it became specifically associated with the zig-zag shape.

== In Japanese literature ==
The Eight Bridges is an utamakura (poem-pillow), or famous place that is repeatedly referred to in literature. Travellers would seek out the Eight Bridges and would often record their response to the place with a poem. Numerous references to the Eight Bridges can be seen in Japanese literature, as in Sarashina Diary, The Tale of the Heike and The Tale of Chikusai:

1. Sarashina Diary was written by the daughter of Sugawara no Takasue, most likely in her fifties, recounting a journey she took from the capital to Kazusa in 1020, when she was a twelve-year-old girl. In this journey she passed several famous sites including the Eight Bridges (Yatsuhashi), which she found disappointing:

The famous Yatsuhashi was there only in name – there was no trace of any bridges, and the actual place was quite unimpressive.

2. The Tale of the Heike is an epic about the power struggle between the Heike and Genji clans that marked the start of the Kamakura period (1185–1333). The Tale of Heike directly references the Eight Bridges' origin by mentioning the poet Narihara (to whom The Tales of Ise is attributed) and by also using the simile of the spider's legs:

... on he went into the land of Mikawa / to Yatsuhashi where once Narihara sang / of one dear to him as a long-worn robe / his wretched heart as full of tangled thoughts / as those eight tangled spider's legs ...

3. The Tale of Chikusai, published around 1624, recounts Chikusai and his manservant's journeys from Edo to Kyoto. Although the Eight Bridges was long gone by the time Chikusai visits, he still claims to be able to see its foundations, highlighting the importance of mythology over actuality when visiting utamakura:

Chikusai was now in the province of Mikawa. When he came to the eight branch bridge (Yatsuhashi) and looked about, the pillars of the ancient bridge still stood rotting here and there. But time passes and things change and no one visits their remains anymore. But still the irises at Yatsuhashi do not forget to bloom in season.

== In Japanese visual arts ==
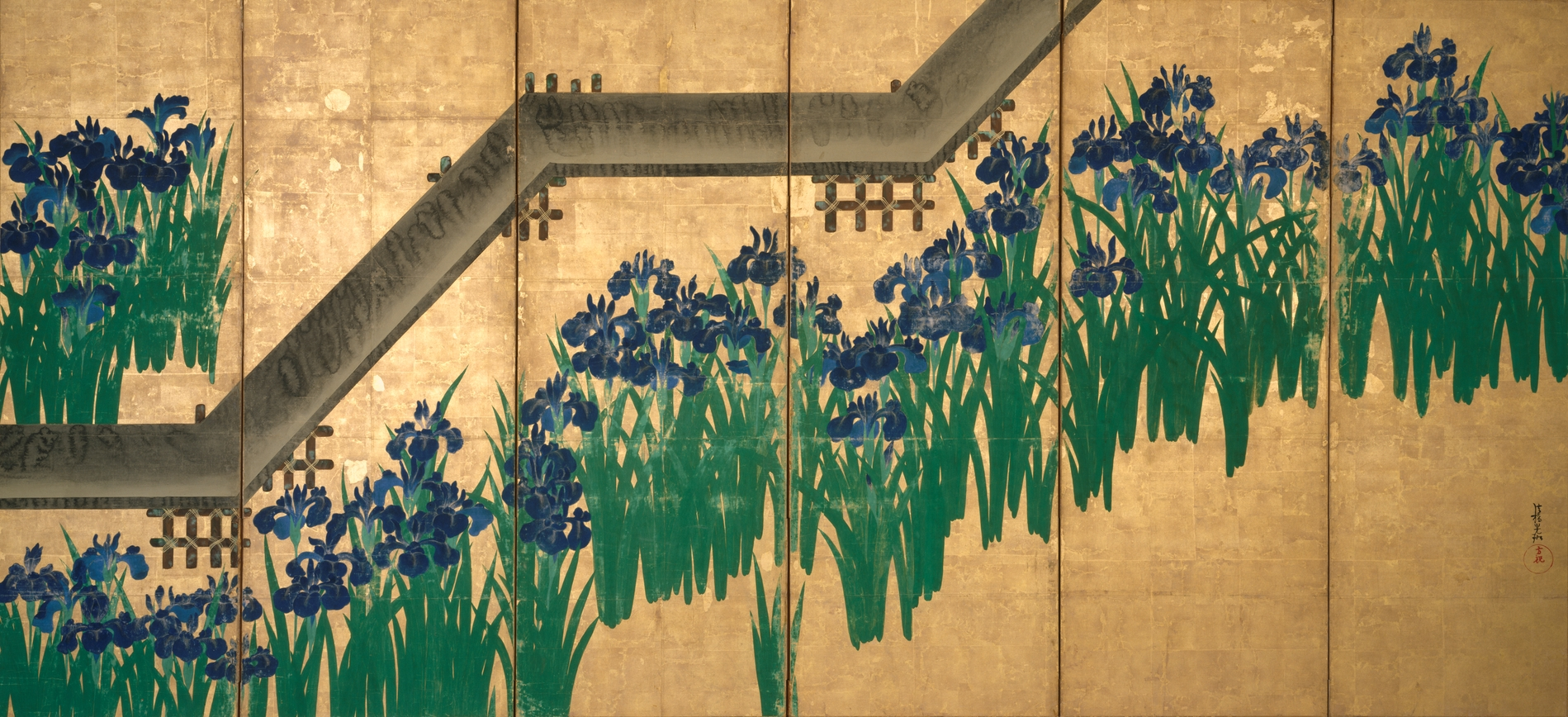
Irises at Yatsuhashi (Eight Bridges), Ogata Kōrin, after 1709

The Eight Bridges design was gradually incorporated into a large range of Japanese arts and craft, as the literary allusion became a specific motif. It can be found on screens, writing boxes and kimonos. The famous Irises at Yatsuhashi pair of six-panel folding screens by Ogata Kōrin depicts the Eight Bridges design running, between clumps of blue irises, diagonally across the screens against a background of gold leaf. A writing box, also made by Ogata Kōrin in the 18th century, depicts the Eight Bridges running through golden reeds with mother-of-pearl irises and is designated a Japanese national treasure. The screen and writing box were both luxury items, but the Eight Bridges motif can also be found on more affordable items, such as prints and kimonos. Katsushika Hokusai's print Ancient View of Yatsuhashi in Mikawa Province, part of his Remarkable Views of Famous Bridges in Various Provinces series, shows numerous people using the Eight Bridges to cross a swamp of irises. The pattern book Onhiinagata (1666) contains a design for a kimono with the Eight Bridges motif running diagonally across the back, beside irises.

Initially this literary motif as applied to arts and crafts was confined to goods used by the elite of Japanese society, but during the Edo period it became known and used by ordinary people.

== In gardens ==
Actual or physical bridges composed of eight segments can be found in Japanese gardens both inside and outside of Japan. The bridge consists of eight wooden or stone planks arranged in a zig-zag pattern, atop piles of wood or stakes. The winding zig-zag pattern promotes a slow crossing that allows different vistas to be admired. Eight Bridges structures are often found near irises, as the original was in The Tales of Ise. Eight Bridges structures can be found in gardens around Japan, including Koishikawa-Kōrakuen in Tokyo, Kōraku-en in Okayama, and Oyama Shrine garden in Kanazawa.

== Outside Japan ==
Eight Bridges structures can also be found outside of Japan, in places including the Missouri Botanical Garden in the United States, the Jardín Japonés in Argentina, and the Sha-rak-uen, or "place of pleasure and delight", built in 1907 at Cowden Castle in Scotland. The latter garden was commissioned by Ella Christie, after returning from a trip to Japan, and the process was overseen by Taki Handa. The garden was praised by Professor Jijo Suzuji, the Eighteenth Hereditary Head of the Soami School of Imperial Design, with the only flaw being the straight bridge, so it was replaced with an Eight Bridges structure.
