= Boitsfort railway station =

Railway station in Brussels, Belgium

Coordinates: 50.7947°N 4.4082°E

Boitsfort Bosvoorde
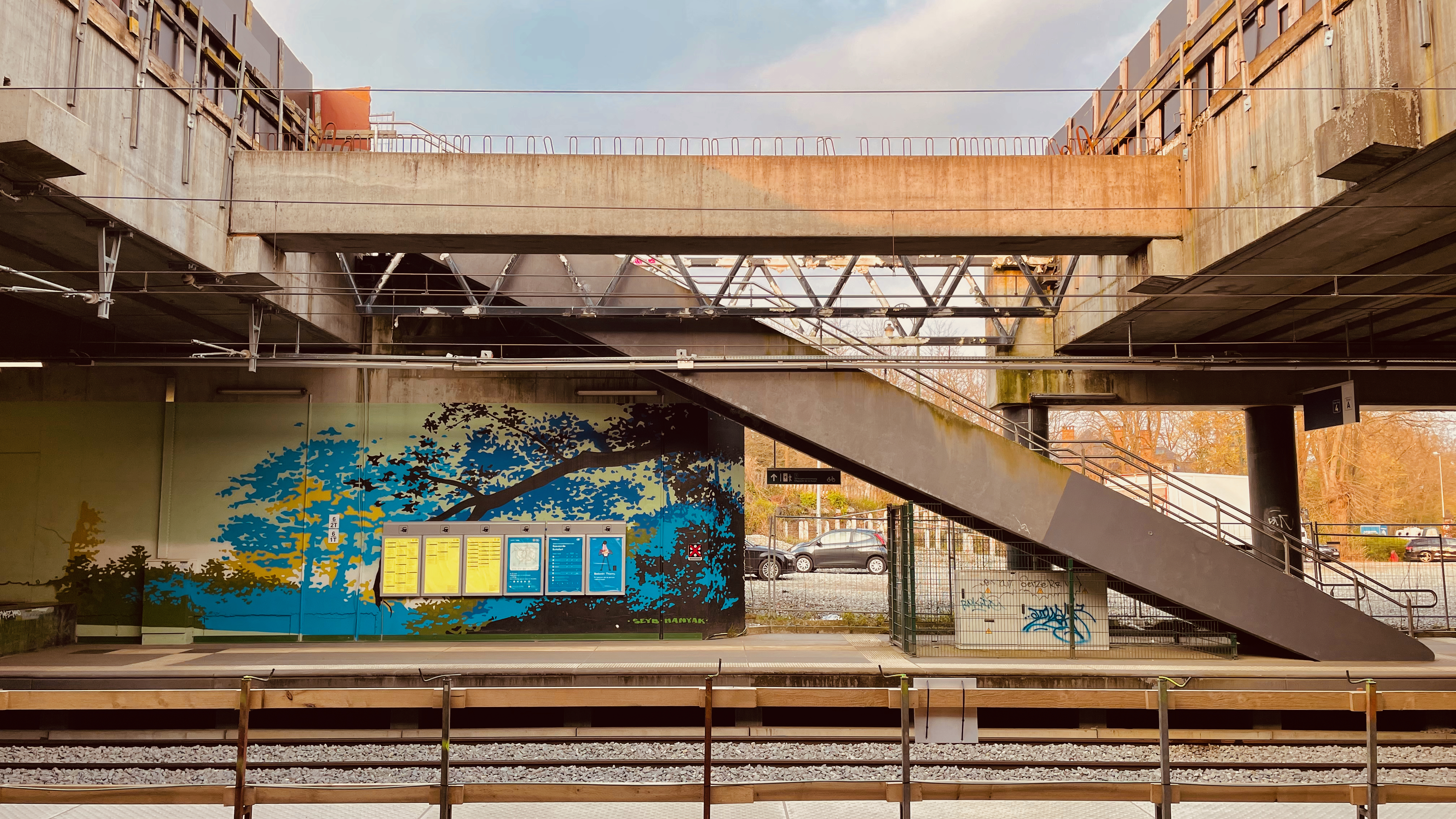
- Boitsfort/Bosvoorde railway station

General information
- Location: Watermael-Boitsfort, Brussels-Capital Region; Belgium
- System: Railway Station
- Owner: SNCB/NMBS
- Operator: SNCB/NMBS
- Line: 161 (Brussels-Namur)
- Platforms: 2
- Tracks: 2

Other information
- Station code: MBR

History
- Opened: 23 August 1854; 172 years ago

Passengers
- 2014: 703
Location
- Location within Belgium Location within Europe

Boitsfort railway station (French: Gare de Boitsfort) or Bosvoorde railway station (Dutch: Station Bosvoorde) (Note: Officially Boitsfort/Bosvoorde (French: Boitsfort; Dutch: Bosvoorde)) is a railway station in the municipality of Watermael-Boitsfort in Brussels, Belgium, operated by the National Railway Company of Belgium (NMBS/SNCB). It lies on line 161, between Watermael and Groenendaal railway stations.

The station can be accessed via the Chaussée de La Hulpe/Terhulpsesteenweg next to the Sonian Forest and the Boitsfort Hippodrome. Many companies have offices near the station, for instance Emakina, Asahi Glass Co. and SAP AG.

== Train services ==
The station is served by the following service(s):

- Brussels RER services (S8) Brussels - Etterbeek - Ottignies - Louvain-le-Neuve
- Brussels RER services (S81) Schaarbeek - Brussels-Luxembourg - Etterbeek - Ottignies (weekdays, peak hours only)

| Preceding station | NMBS/SNCB | Following station |
|---|---|---|
| Watermael towards Bruxelles-Midi / Brussel-Zuid | S 8 | Groenendaal towards Louvain-la-Neuve |
| Watermael towards Schaarbeek | S 81 weekdays | Groenendaal towards Ottignies |

== See also ==
- List of railway stations in Belgium
- Rail transport in Belgium
- Transport in Brussels
- History of Brussels
