= Van der Meulen family =

Old family of Brussels

van der Meulen family (van der or vander) Molen, Moelen
- Estate: Fief of the Roetaert

The van der Meulen family of Brussels was an important bourgeois family of freshwater fish merchants. Many of its members were deans of the guild of freshwater fish merchants

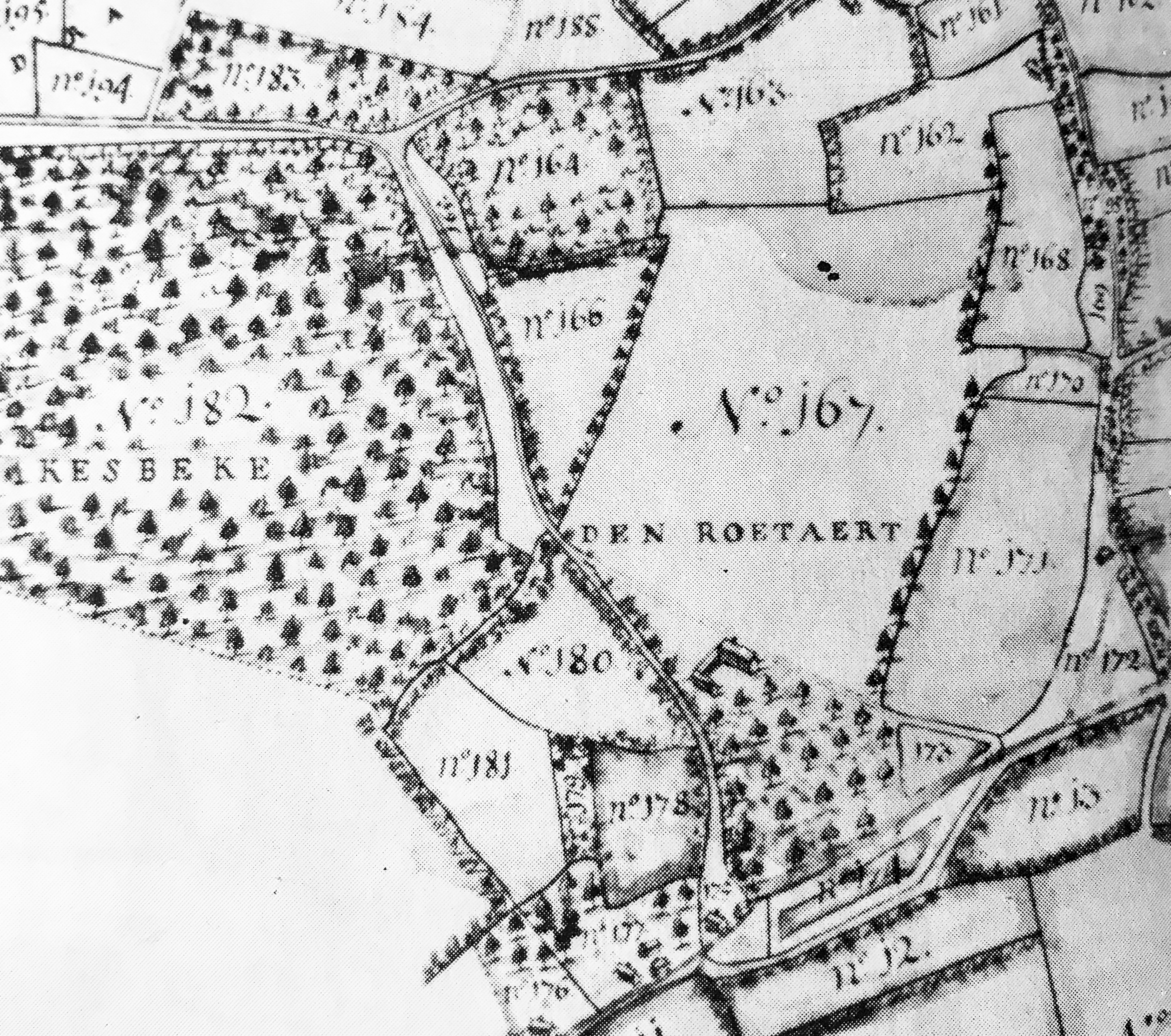
Fiefdom of the Roetaert on a map from 1741 by Charles Everaert, while it was owned by the van der Meulen family.

== Properties and estates ==
They owned the fiefdom of the Roetaert as well as numerous fishponds and lakes, especially in the Sonian Forest, such as the famous Enfants Noyés ponds, which Elisabeth van der Meulen (1720–1769), wife of Jean-Baptiste van Dievoet (1704–1776), sold to the state in 1744.

== Arms ==
There are two variants of the arms of the Van der Meulen family
Blazon	Image
Per pale, I, Or, a double-headed eagle Gules. II, quarterly, I and IV, Gules, a saltire Ermine, in base a mullet of six points pierced Or (van de Voorde). II and III, Sable, a lion Argent armes, langued, and crowned à l'antique Or (Brabant-Gaesbeek).	sans_cadre
Per pale, I, Or, a double-headed eagle Sable. II, quarterly, I and IV, Gules, a saltire Ermine. II and III, Sable, a lion Or.	sans_cadre

== See also ==
- Guilds of Brussels
- Bourgeois of Brussels
