= Watermael-Boitsfort =

Municipality of the Brussels-Capital Region, Belgium

Watermael-Boitsfort: Watermael-Boitsfort (French); Watermaal-Bosvoorde (Dutch)
- Municipality
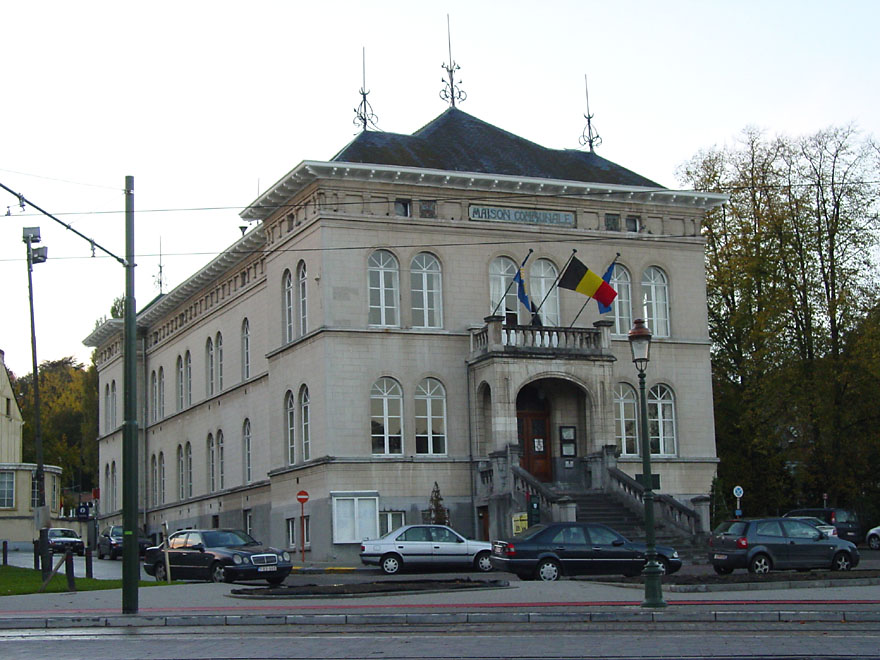
- Watermael-Boitsfort's Municipal Hall, built in 1845

- Flag Coat of arms

- Watermael-Boitsfort municipality in the Brussels-Capital Region
- Interactive map of Watermael-Boitsfort
- Location in Belgium
- Coordinates: 50°48′N 04°25′E
- Country: Belgium
- Community: Flemish Community; French Community
- Region: Brussels-Capital
- Arrondissement: Brussels-Capital

Government
  - Mayor: David Leisterh (MR)
  - Governing parties: MR-GM-Les Engagés; Ecolo-Groen; PS; DéFI

Area
  - Total: 12.97 km^{2} (5.01 sq mi)

Population (2020-01-01)
  - Total: 25,332
  - Density: 1,953/km^{2} (5,059/sq mi)
- Postal codes: 1170
- NIS code: 21017
- Area codes: 02
- Website: www.watermael-boitsfort.be (in French) www.watermaal-bosvoorde.be (in Dutch)

Watermael-Boitsfort (French, pronounced [watɛʁmal bwafɔʁ]) or Watermaal-Bosvoorde (Dutch, pronounced [ˈʋaːtərmaːl ˈbɔsfoːrdə]; archaic spelling: Watermael-Boschvoorde), often simply called Boitsfort in French or Bosvoorde in Dutch, is one of the 19 municipalities of the Brussels-Capital Region, Belgium. Located in the south-eastern part of the region, it is bordered by Auderghem, the City of Brussels (namely the Bois de la Cambre/Ter Kamerenbos), Ixelles, and Uccle, as well as the Flemish municipalities of Hoeilaart, Overijse and Sint-Genesius-Rode. Like all municipalities in Brussels, it is officially bilingual (French–Dutch).

As of 1 January 2022, the municipality had a population of 25,187 inhabitants. The total area is 12.97 km^{2} (5.01 sq mi) of which 58% is covered by the Sonian Forest, which gives a population density of 1,942/km^{2} (5,030/sq mi), four times less than the average of Brussels. Its average annual income per inhabitant is also the highest in the region (€25,063 in 2020).

== History ==
The modern-day municipality of Watermael-Boitsfort was originally two separate settlements located on a plain between the two small rivers of Woluwe and Watermaelbeek to the north of the Sonian Forest. The earliest evidence of human activity in the region are the remains of a small fortified neolithic village of the Michelsberg culture, dating to between 3500 and 2500 BC.

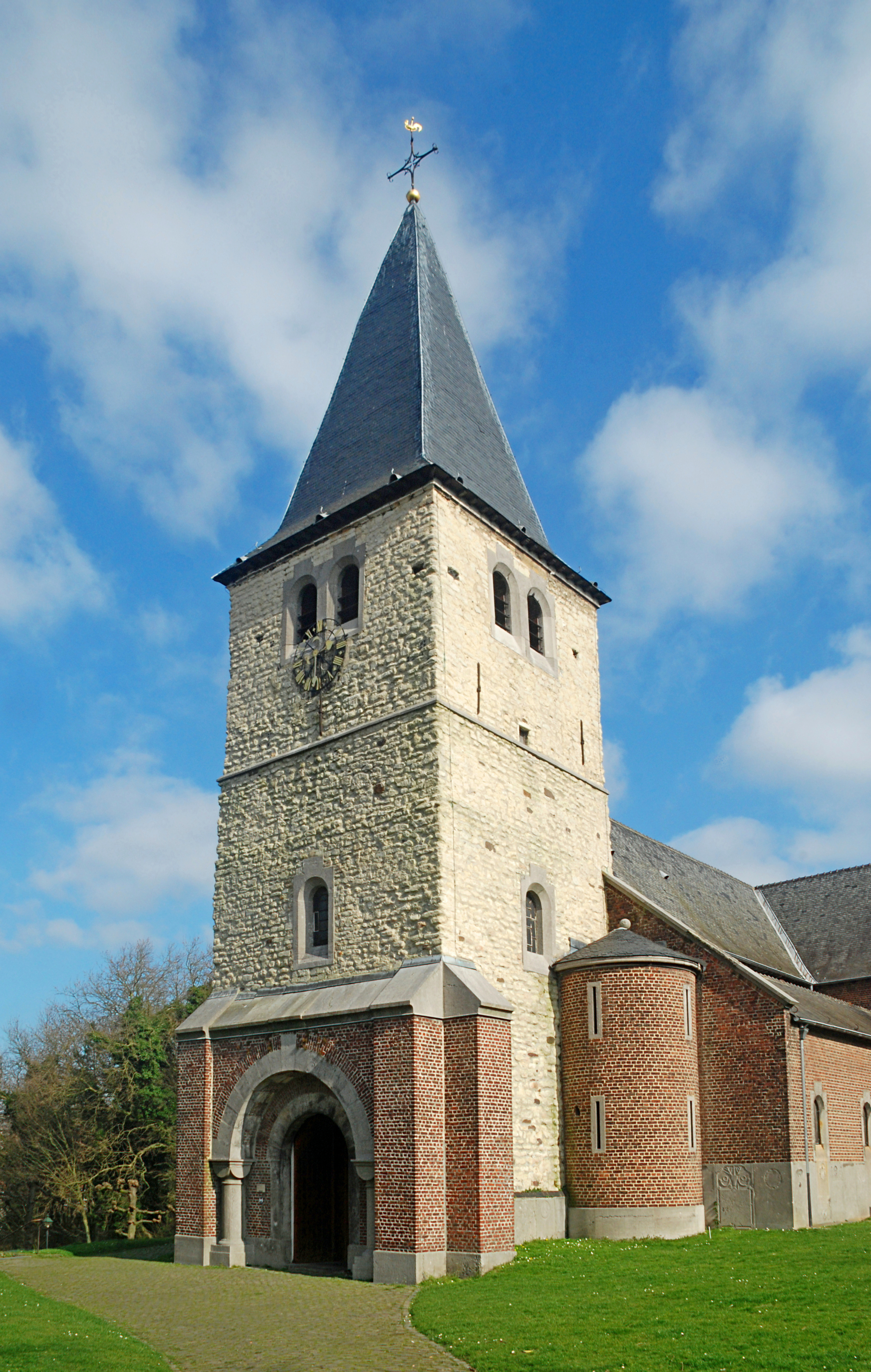
The Church of St. Clement, whose tower dates from the 11th century

The earliest mention of the name Watermael (a word suggested to derives from mahlo, the Frankish word "water" and "depression in the land") is in a document of 914 bequeathing an estate of the name to a French abbey. Originally part of the estate of Watermael, Boitfort became separate after a hunting lodge, on a site adjacent to the forest, was given to the Boutsvoord family by the Duchy of Brabant in the 13th century. During the Middle Ages, inhabitants of the two settlements farmed and raised cattle and a number of hunting lodges on the edge of the forest were built for members of the nobility. The construction of a road to Brussels, to the north, through Boitsfort led to the rapid expansion of both settlements. The population of Watermael rose from 349 inhabitants in 1709 to 826 in 1800.

Watermael-Boitsfort was created in 1811 during the period of French rule when the two municipalities were merged. Although several industries grew in the area during the 19th century, Watermael-Boitsfort remained largely agrarian and increasingly residential, especially after the municipality was linked to Brussels by railway in 1854. It soon became a fashionable, bourgeois neighbourhood. Originally Dutch was the dominant language, but French became dominant after 1920. During the 1920s, two garden cities—Le Logis and Floréal—were built. The municipality's population hit an all-time peak of 25,138 inhabitants in 1970.

One of Watermael-Boitsfort's first mayors was the liberal Pierre-Théodore Verhaegen, known for his role in the creation of the Free University of Brussels, who held the post between 1825 and 1842.

== Economy and demographics ==
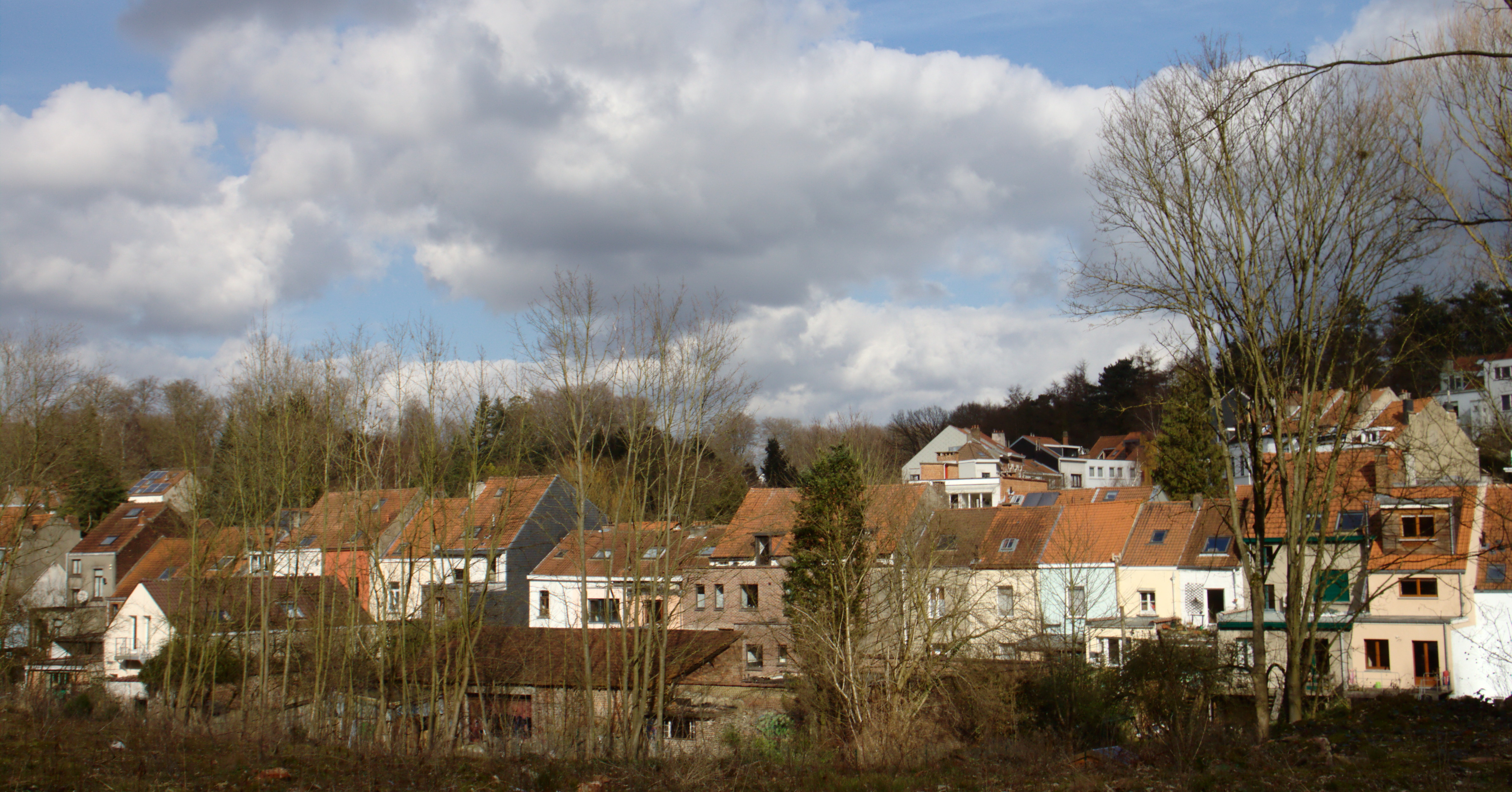
View of houses in Boitsfort

Watermael-Boitsfort is one of Brussels' wealthiest municipalities. In 2002, the average per capita income was €30,100; over €600 higher than the average for the Brussels-Capital Region as a whole. 16% of its inhabitants were not Belgian citizens; lower than the Brussels average.

Since 2000, the municipal government is dominated by the liberal Mouvement Réformateur, regionalist DéFI (formerly FDF), and green Ecolo parties. The current bourgmestre (mayor) is Olivier Deleuze of Ecolo.

There are two railway stations located within the municipality, Watermael railway station and Boitsfort railway station, both of which are located on railway line 161.

The International School of Brussels (ISB), founded in 1951, is located in Watermael-Boitsfort.

== Remarkable buildings ==
Notable historic buildings in Watermael-Boitsfort include the Church of St. Clement of which parts date to the 11th century. The municipality also regroups many former grand country houses, such as:

- Chateau Tournay-Solvay, former house of Alfred Solvay
- Château de Jolimont, residence of among others the painter Jacques d'Arthois
- Château Bischoffsheim, housing the International School of Brussels
- Château Charle-Albert; former house of Belgian Prime Minister Paul van Zeeland
- Château Morel
- Château des Fougères; now part of a luxury condominium complex
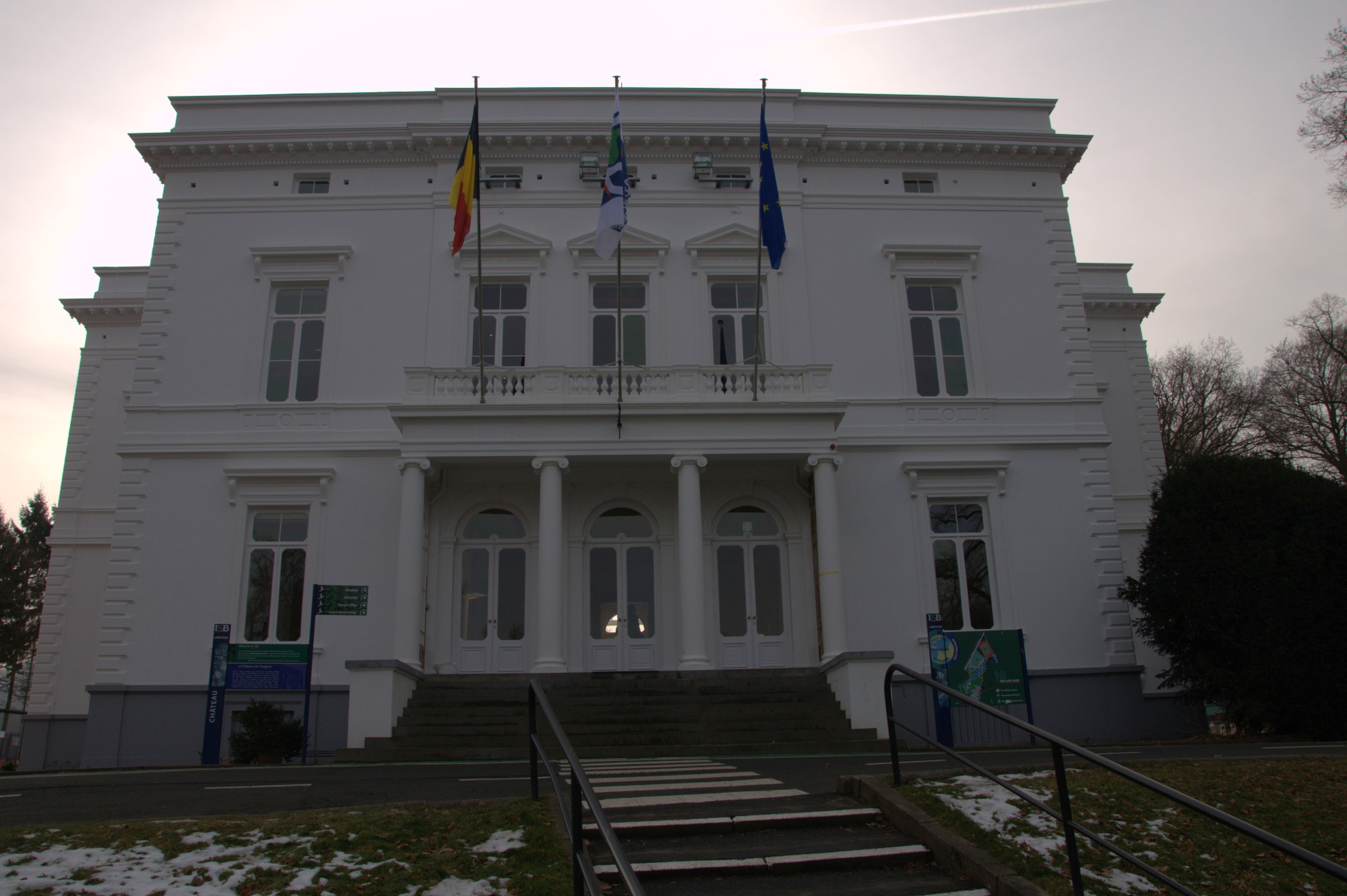
Château Bischoffsheim

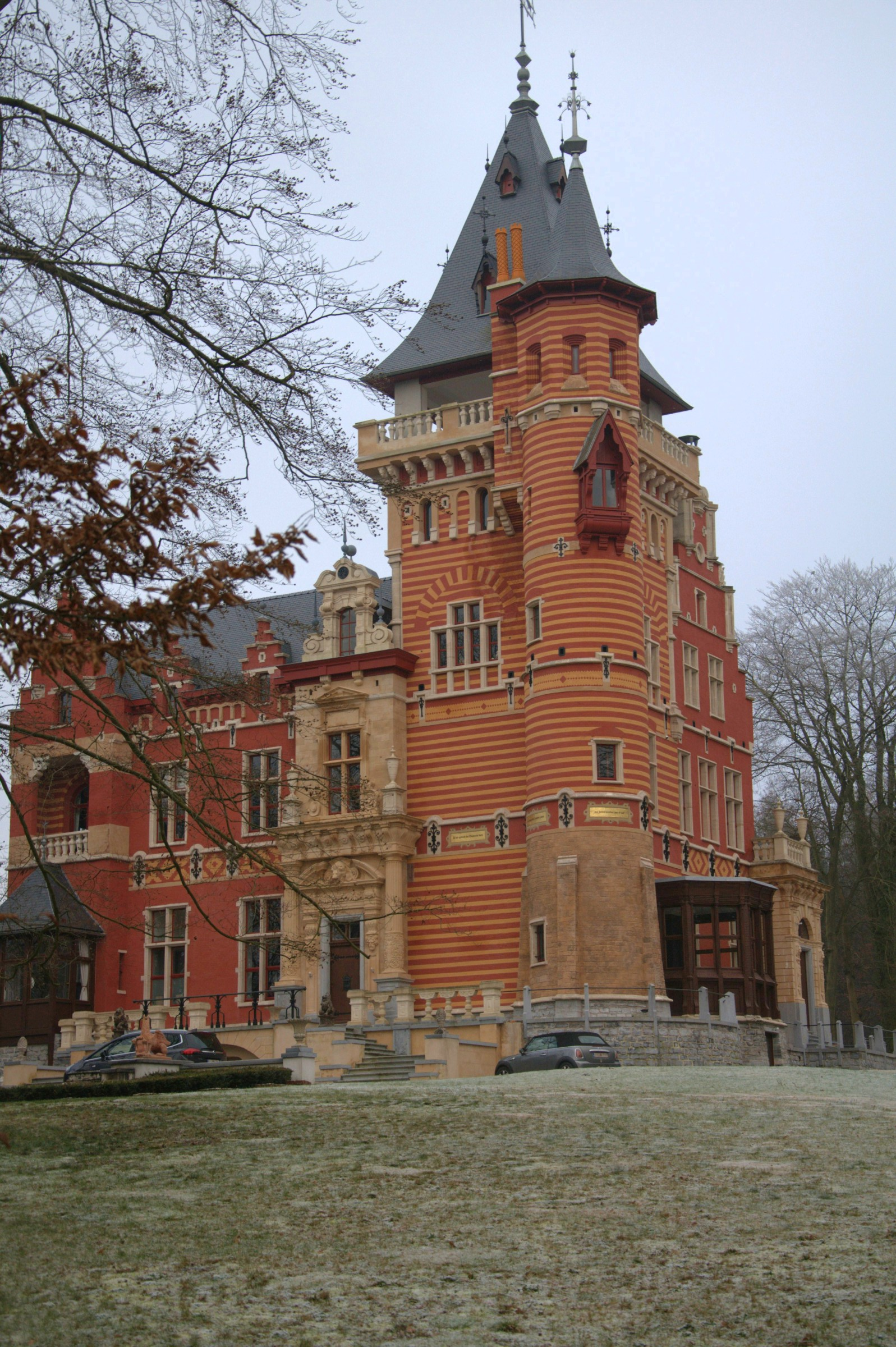
Château Charle-Albert

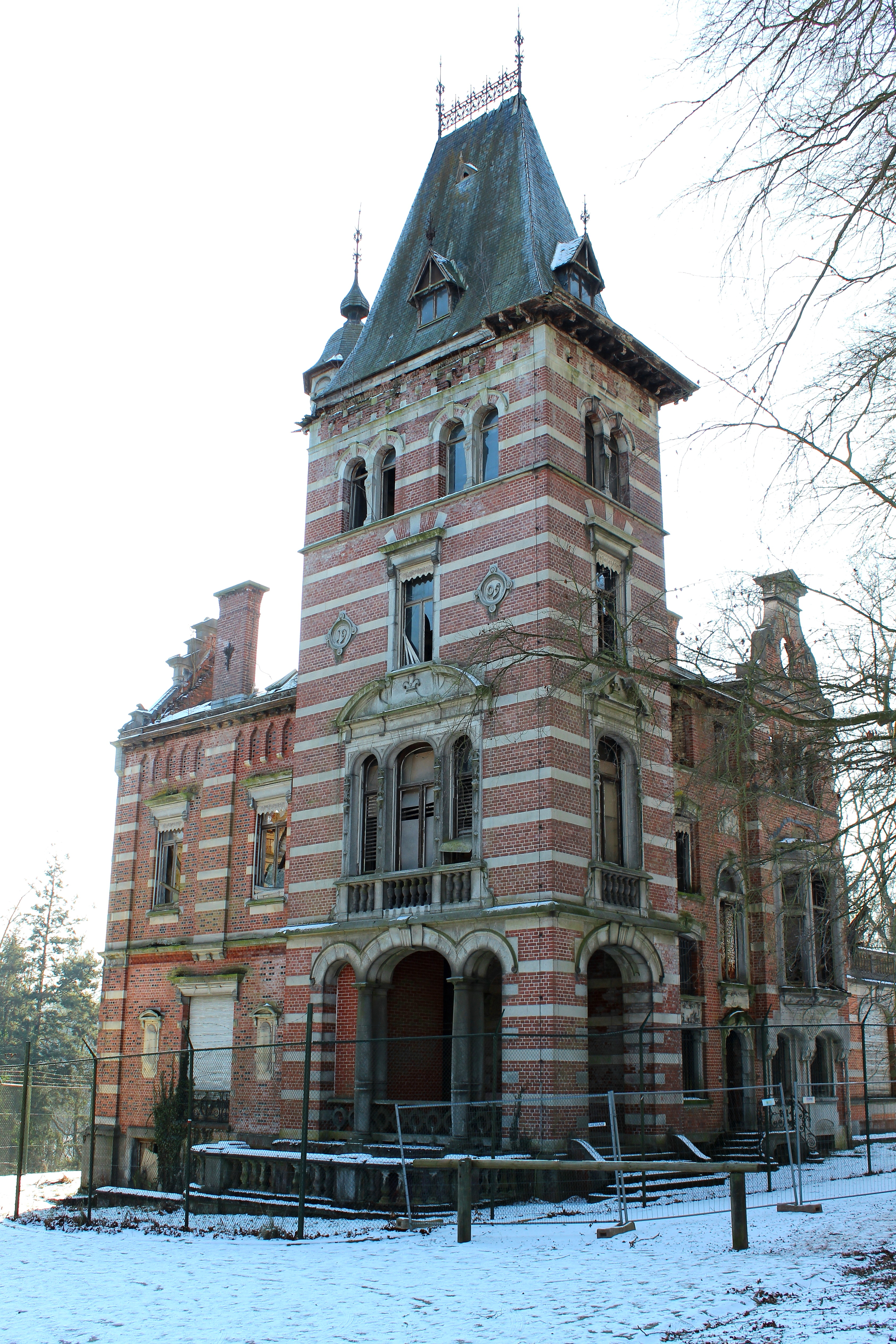
Château Tournay-Solvay

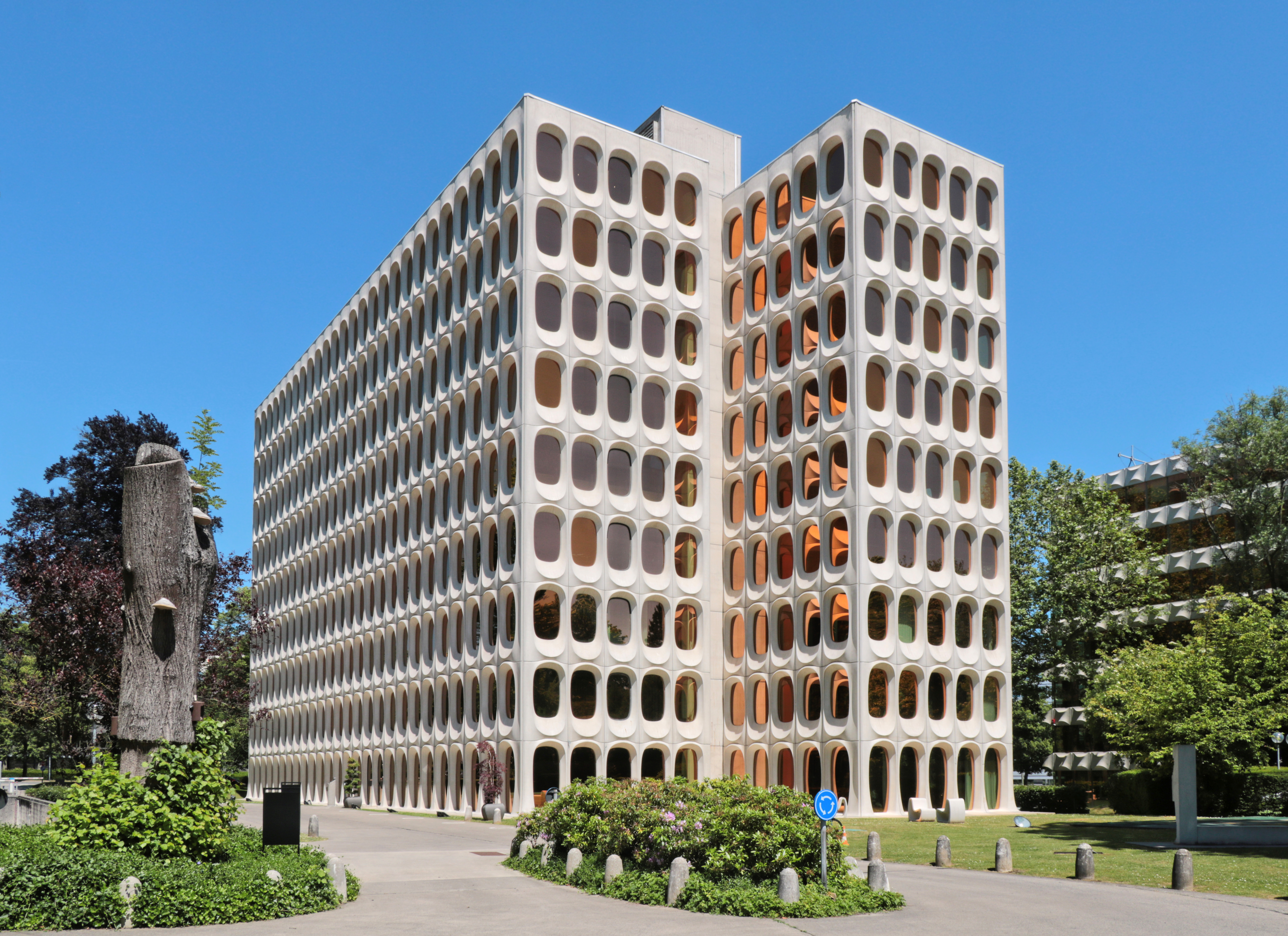
CBR Building

== Sport ==
Watermael-Boitsfort is home to Boitsfort Rugby Club, one of Belgium's most successful Rugby Union teams. It is also home to football team Royal Racing Club de Boitsfort.

The Boitsfort Hippodrome was a horse-racing course, built in 1875 but is no longer used as such. Since 1987, the centre of the course has been occupied by the Brussels Golf Club, which has a nine-hole course, and the former horse racing track is used by runners, bikers and dog-walkers. It frequently acts as the starting point and finish line for local 10 km (6 mi) runs. In 2016, the park, rebranded as DROHME with new investors, saw major renovations of the bleachers and the jockey-weighing station, which in September 2018 reopened as a brasserie.

== Politics ==
The current city council was elected in the October 2018 elections. The current mayor of Watermael-Boitsfort is Olivier Deleuze, a member of Ecolo, who is in coalition on the municipal council with the Reformist Movement.

Party	Seats
Ecolo	12
DéFI	7
Reformist Movement (MR)	6
Socialist Party (PS)	3
Humanist Democratic Centre (cdH)	1
Total	29

== Notable inhabitants ==
- Auguste Beernaert (1829–1912), politician and Nobel Peace Prize winner, Prime Minister
- Omer Coppens (1864–1926), impressionist artist
- Willy Coppens (1892–1986), flying ace of World War I
- Paul Delvaux (1897–1994), artist. Delvaux painted Watermael station on a number of occasions.
- Georges Remi, also known as Hergé (1907–1983), comics writer and artist, creator of The Adventures of Tintin
- Rik Wouters (1882–1916), artist and sculptor

== International relations ==
=== Twin towns and sister cities ===
Watermael-Boitsfort is twinned with:

- Chantilly, France
- Annan, Scotland, United Kingdom

In addition, Watermael-Boitsfort has signed a European partnership with:

- Hegyvidék, Budapest, Hungary
