= International School of Brussels =

School in Brussels, Belgium

Location
- Brussels; Belgium; 50°47′20″N 4°25′1″E

Information
- Type: Private school
- Motto: Everyone Included. Everyone Challenged. Everyone Successful.
- Established: 1951
- Head teacher: James MacDonald
- Faculty: 200
- Enrollment: 1,350
- Campus: 162,134.62 m^{2} (40.06434 acres)
- Mascot: Raid
- Website: www.isb.be

The International School of Brussels (ISB) is an English-language international school in the Brussels municipality of Watermael-Boitsfort.

== History ==
The International School of Brussels (ISB) was established in October 1951 under the name of American School of Brussels. Its initial purpose was to provide educational services to U.S. Department of Defense personnel and their families living in the vicinity. Commencing with a teaching staff of four and an enrollment of 27 students, aged 5 to 11, the school was first located in Woluwe-Saint-Pierre. By 1953, as the student body grew to approximately 100, the institution relocated to the Château des Fougères in Watermael-Boitsfort and assumed its present name.

In 1966, ISB expanded its infrastructure with the addition of a high school building. That was followed in 1967 by the construction of a new elementary school building. Initially, the entire school's operations were housed within the Château. On January 1, 1977, ISB became the 50th school globally to offer the International Baccalaureate program. That same year, it also organized its first International Festival.

In February 2006, the school board decided to initiate fundraising efforts. This decision was made based on the conclusion that the tuition fees charged to its students were inadequate to meet the school's requirements. This decision signaled a greater emphasis on financial planning to support the school's operations and development.

Chateau des Fougères

== Campus and facilities ==
The International School of Brussels (ISB) occupies a 162,134.6 m² (1,745,202 sq ft) expanse of wooded land. The campus encompasses a variety of structures, including academic buildings, athletic facilities, and a performing arts center. Specific campus features are:

- Early Childhood Centre (ECC): For students aged 2 1/2–8
- Elementary School (ES): For students aged 8–12
- Middle School (MS): For students aged 12–15
- High School (HS): For students aged 15–19
- Château des Fougères: A 19th-century building that houses administrative offices, along with a reception area for parents.
- Athletic Facilities: Comprises an outdoor track, two gymnasiums, and 15 hectares (37 acres) of playing fields and wooded areas.
- Performing Arts Center: Functions as venue for concerts and theatrical productions.
- International Community Centre (ICC): Houses additional facilities and rooms for community activities.
- Additional Features: The campus includes a theater, an annex building, and multiple sports facilities for its extracurricular programs.

== Academics ==
ISB offers a wide range of academic programs. It offers 45 International Baccalaureate courses to students. It has an Intensive Learning Support (ILS) program.

== Tuition and finance ==
Annual tuition fees at ISB vary based on grade level, ranging from €21,650 for preschool to €46,725 for grades 10-12. Specialized support programs incur additional charges.

== Community ==
As of 2024, ISB has an enrollment of around 1,300 students from 65 countries. The school employs 229 faculty members representing 23 nationalities and 107 staff members representing 26 nationalities.

== Leadership ==
The board of trustees of ISB consists of approximately 18 members and three to four ex-officio members. There are also several honorary trustees, who are all volunteers. Given the school's population turnover rate of 25% annually, the board endeavors to maintain a balance between long-term and short-term members. Board members are appointed for three-year renewable terms, with a maximum length of service of nine years. Each member serves on either one of the standing committees or an ad hoc committee, depending on their area of expertise. The Board is responsible for formulating the school's strategic direction and safeguarding its mission. This includes ensuring the school's accountability in all aspects of its mission, verifying the soundness of its financial basis, and taking all necessary steps to ensure its long-term viability.

== Extracurricular activities ==
ISB's extracurricular programs include:

- Athletics: Sports such as basketball, cross-country, football, volleyball, field hockey, and track & field. Notably, ISB is one of the few international schools that offer American football.
- Arts: Music programs, theater productions, and art exhibitions.
- Cultural Events: The annual International Festival serves as a celebration of the diverse cultures represented within the school community.

== Financial overview ==
During the 2018-2019 academic year, ISB reported revenues of €54.17 million and expenses of €54.76 million, indicating a proactive approach to fundraising and financial management to maintain its facilities and programs.

== ISB during summer ==
ISB also offers summer camps, such as basketball, theatre, and soccer camps.
