= Watermael railway station =

Railway station in Brussels, Belgium

Watermael Watermaal
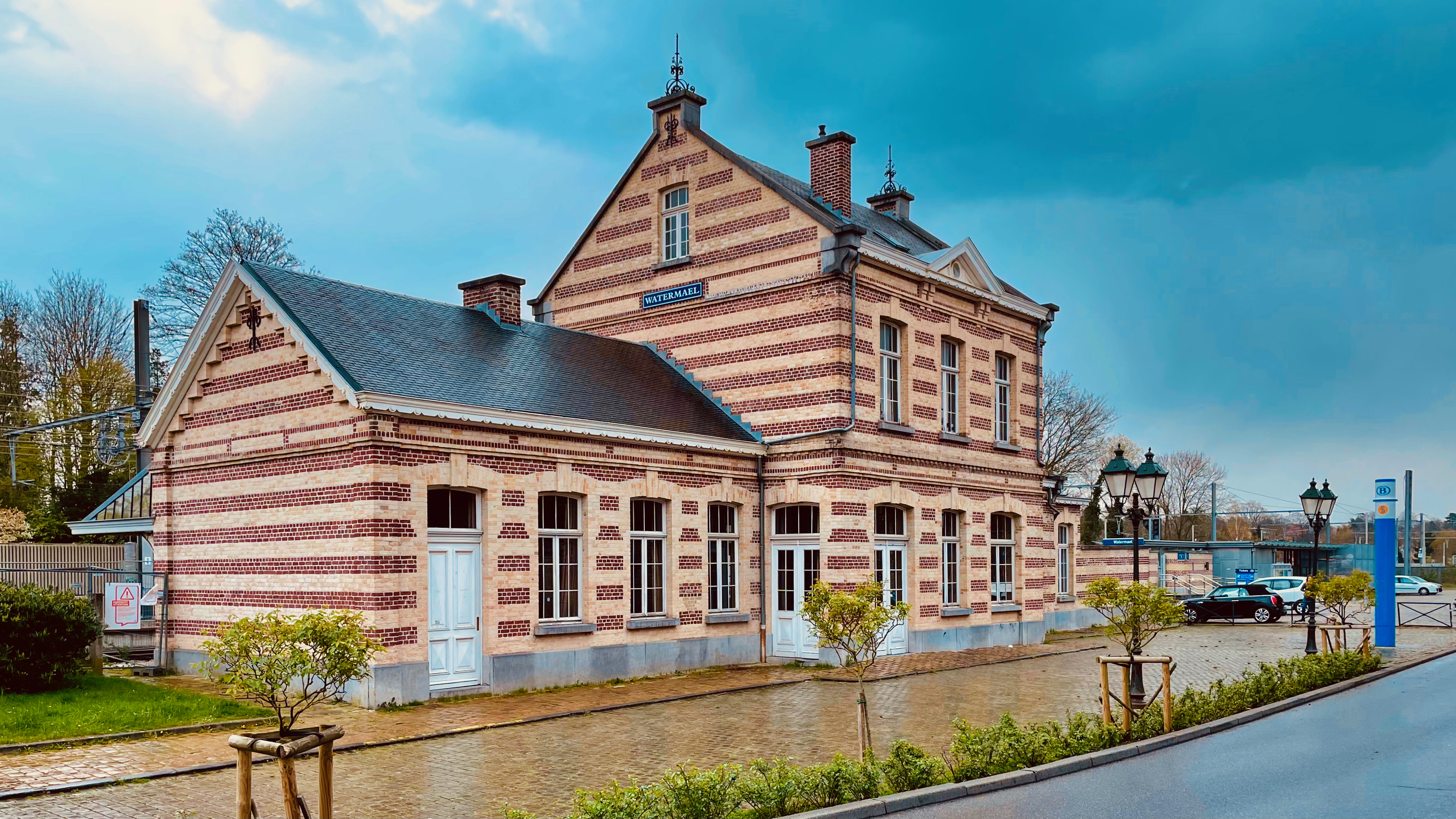
- Watermael/Watermaal railway station

General information
- Location: Watermael-Boitsfort, Brussels-Capital Region; Belgium
- Coordinates: 50.8091°N 4.3997°E
- System: Railway Station
- Owner: SNCB/NMBS
- Operator: SNCB/NMBS
- Line: 161 (Brussels-Namur)
- Platforms: 2
- Tracks: 4

Other information
- Station code: FW

Passengers
- 2014: 182 per day
Location
- Location within Belgium Location within Europe

Watermael railway station (French: Gare de Watermael) or Watermaal railway station (Dutch: Station Watermaal) (Note: Officially Watermael/Watermaal (French: Watermael; Dutch: Watermaal)) is a railway station in the municipality of Watermael-Boitsfort in Brussels, Belgium, operated by the National Railway Company of Belgium (NMBS/SNCB). The station is located on line 161, between Etterbeek and Boitsfort railway stations. It has been painted many times by the famous painter Paul Delvaux.

== Train services ==
The station is served by the following service(s):

- Brussels RER services (S8) Brussels - Etterbeek - Ottignies - Louvain-le-Neuve
- Brussels RER services (S81) Schaarbeek - Brussels-Luxembourg - Etterbeek - Ottignies (weekdays, peak hours only)

Preceding station	NMBS/SNCB	Following station
Etterbeek towards Bruxelles-Midi / Brussel-Zuid	S 8	Boitsfort towards Louvain-la-Neuve
Etterbeek towards Schaarbeek	S 81 weekdays	Boitsfort towards Ottignies

== See also ==
- List of railway stations in Belgium
- Rail transport in Belgium
- Transport in Brussels
- History of Brussels
