= Enfants Noyés Nature Reserve =

Nature reserve in Brussels, Belgium

The Enfants Noyés Nature Reserve (French: Réserve naturelle des Enfants Noyés; Dutch: Natuurreservaat van de Verdronken Kinderen), commonly called the Enfants Noyés Ponds (French: Étangs des Enfants Noyés; Dutch: Vijvers van de Verdronken Kinderen), is a nature reserve located in a valley of the Sonian Forest in Brussels, Belgium. It contains three large ponds: the Étang du Fer à Cheval (Horseshoe Pond), the Étang des Canards Sauvages (Wild Ducks' Pond) and the Étang du Clos des Chênes (Oaks' Grove Pond).

== History ==
The Van der Meulen family owned the ponds until they were sold to the state in 1744.

=== Origins and name ===
The Enfants Noyés Nature Reserve owes its name to a misunderstanding. A mill once stood on the edge of the pond. It belonged to a certain Verdroncken (Dutch for "drowned"). His children inherited it and it became known as the Mill of the Verdroncken children (Kinderen Verdroncken), until a mistranslation turned Kinderen Verdroncken into Verdronken Kinderen, which literally means "drowned children".

=== Commercial use ===
Through successive inheritances, the ponds became the property of the Van der Meulen family, an important family of freshwater fish merchants in Brussels, many of whom were deans of the guild of freshwater fishmongers. They owned many fishponds and ponds, notably in the Sonian Forest. Elisabeth Van der Meulen (1720–1769), wife of Jean-Baptiste van Dievoet (1704–1776), was the last owner of the ponds; it was she who sold them to the state in 1744.

== Ponds ==
Three ponds occupy the valley, connected by a stream, the Karregat, which becomes one of the tributaries of the Woluwe: the Étang du Fer à Cheval (Horseshoe Pond), the Étang des Canards Sauvages (Wild Ducks' Pond) and the Étang du Clos des Chênes (Oaks' Grove Pond).

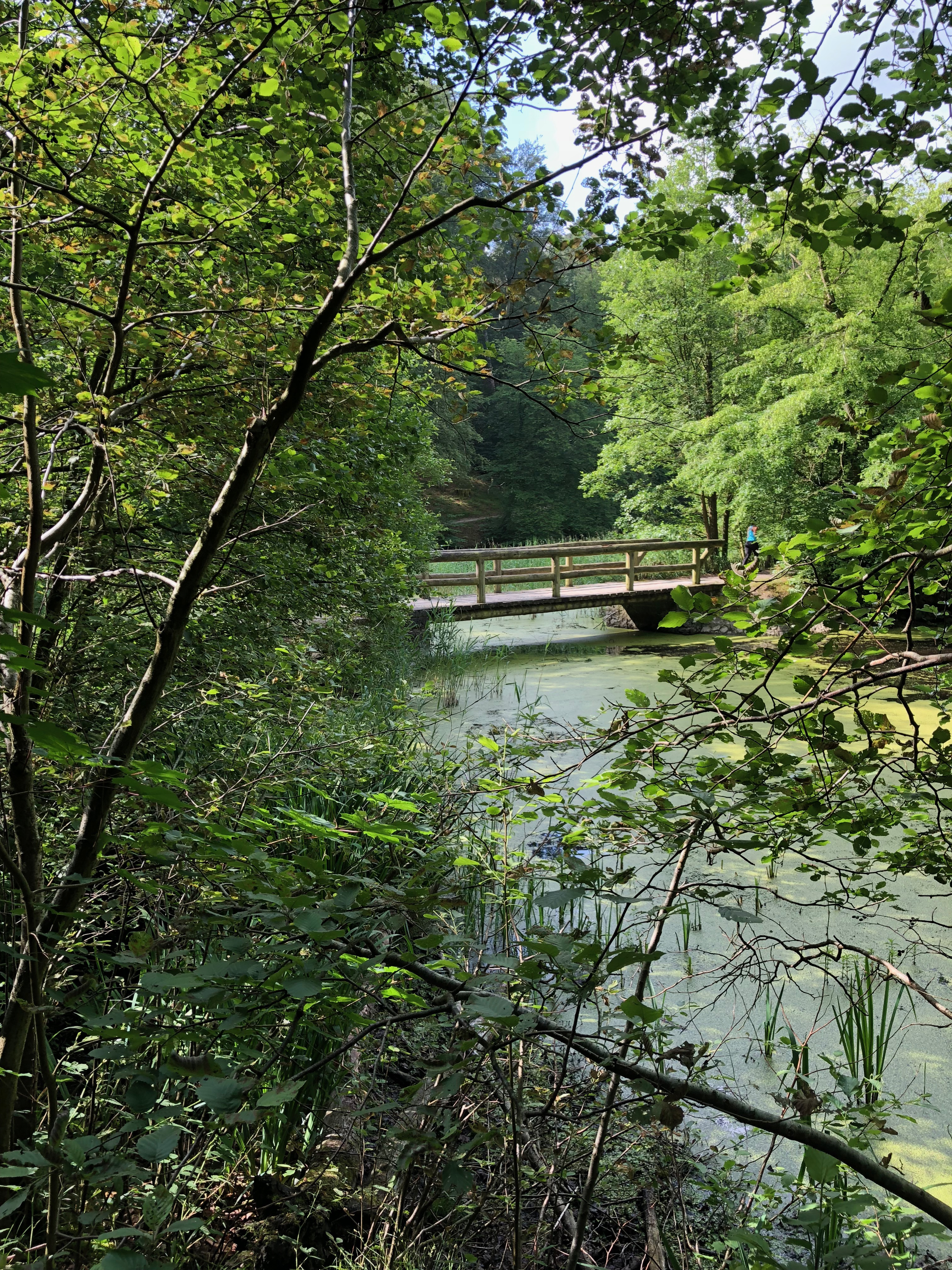
Étang du Fer à Cheval

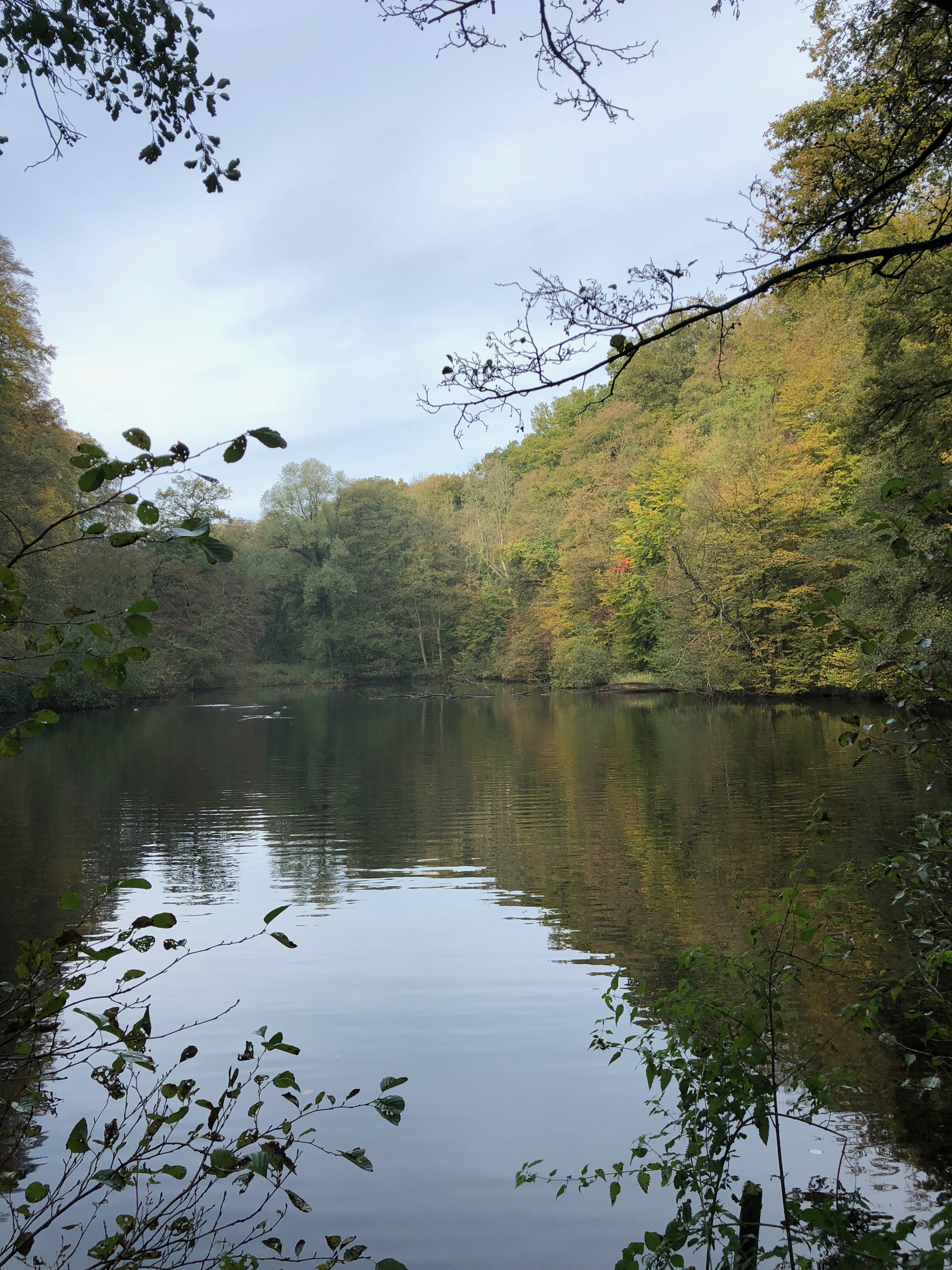
Étang des Canards Sauvages

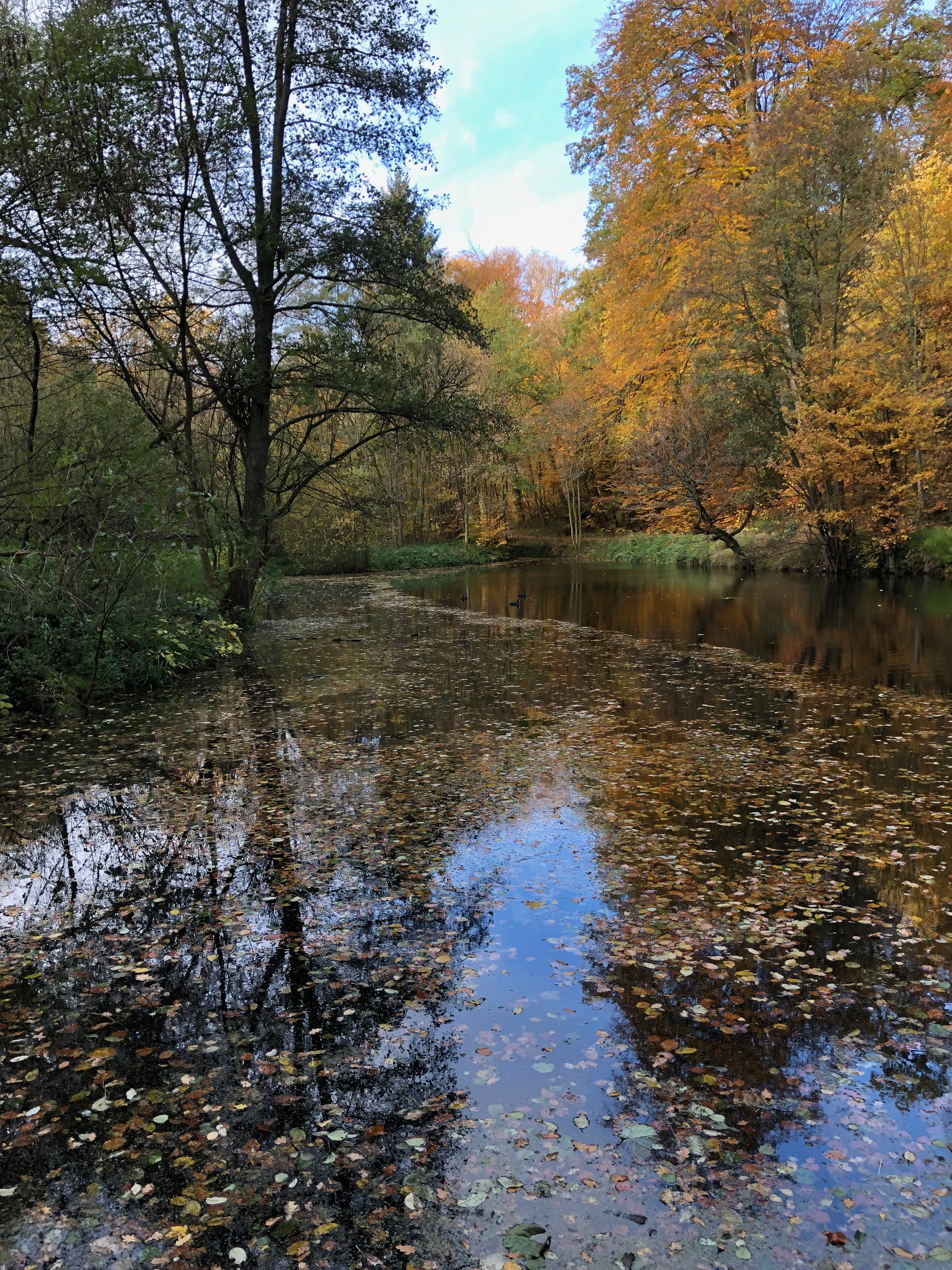
Étang du Clos des Chênes

== Archaeology ==
Archaeological traces of human settlements, stone axes, arrowheads, scrapers, hammerstones, as well as spherical vases with flared necks (preserved at the Royal Museums of Art and History) dating from 3,000 to 2,200 BC have been discovered between the valley of the nature reserve and that of Vuylbeek. At that time, the Sonian Forest extended over most of Western Europe. Also visible not far from the ponds are multiple tumuli (burial mounds), probably built during the first millennium BC.

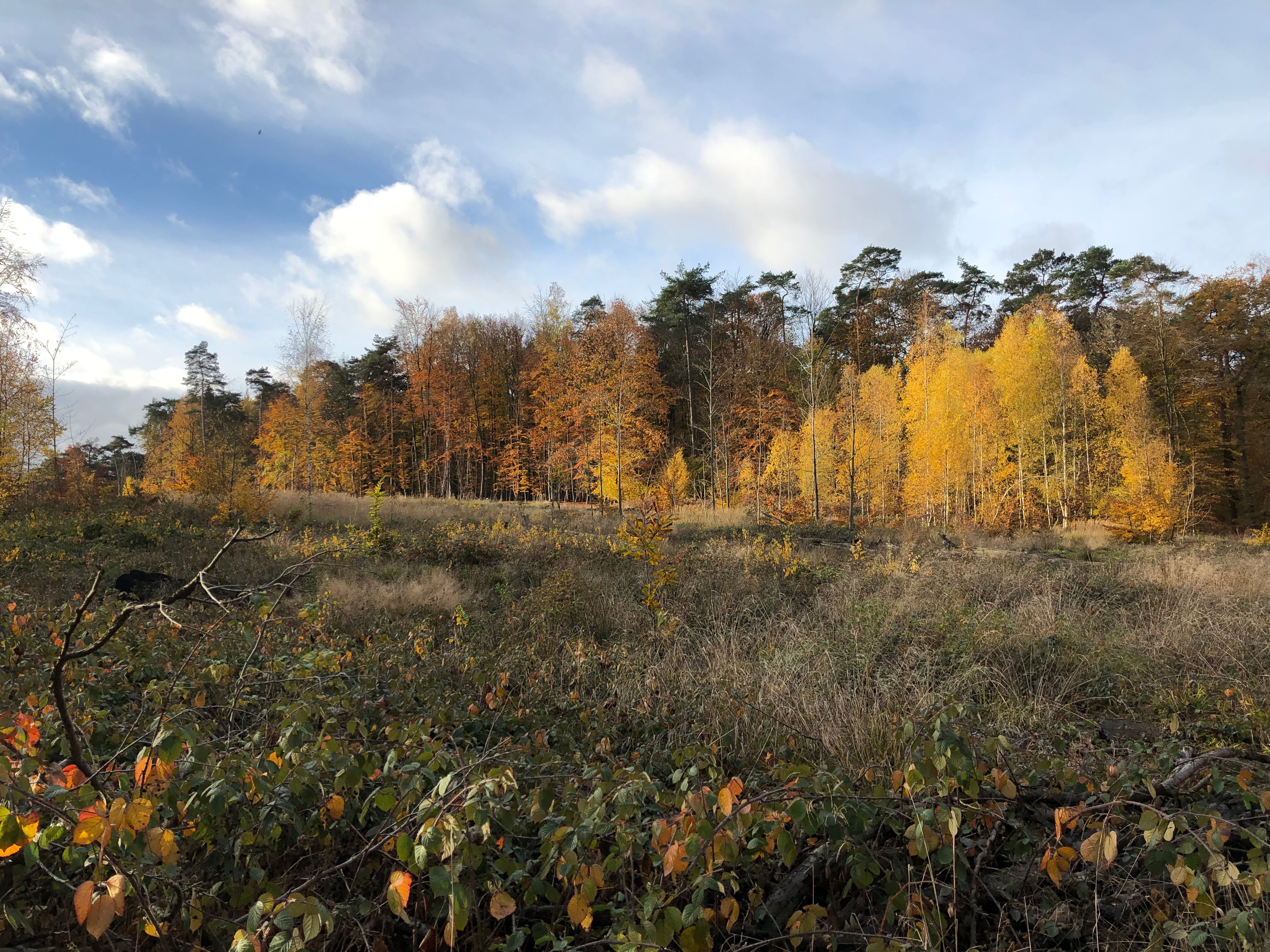
The archaeological site

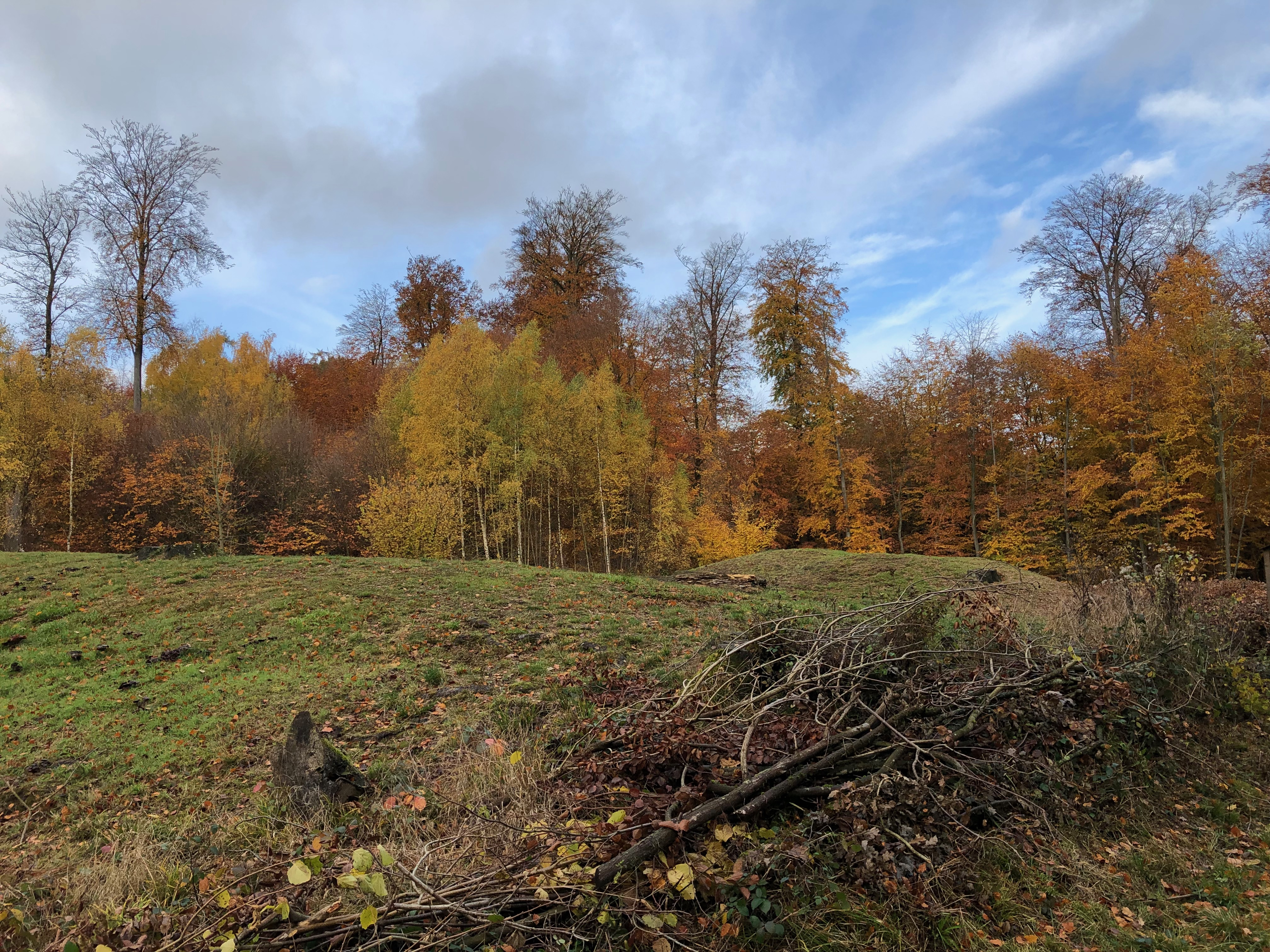
The tumuli near the ponds

== See also ==
- List of parks and gardens in Brussels
- History of Brussels
