= Church of St. Clement, Watermael-Boitsfort =

Church in Watermael-Boitsfort, Belgium

Church of St. Clement
- Église Saint-Clément (French); Sint-Clemenskerk (Dutch)
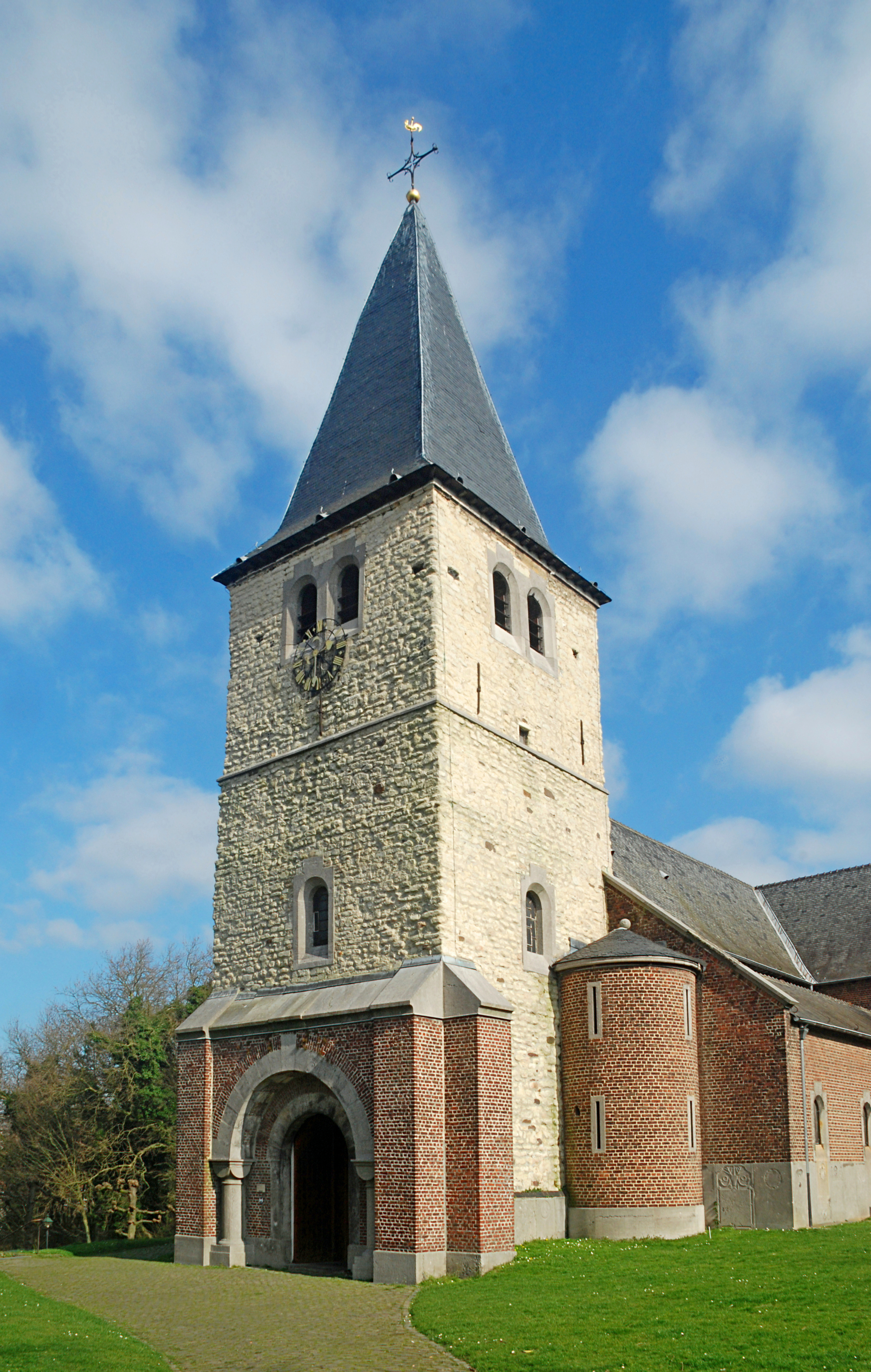
- Church of St. Clement
- 50°48′35″N 4°24′20″E
- Location: Watermael-Boitsfort, Brussels-Capital Region
- Country: Belgium
- Denomination: Catholic Church

History
- Dedication: Saint Clement

Architecture
- Functional status: Active
- Architectural type: Church
- Style: Romanesque; Romanesque Revival
- Years built: c. 11th–19th centuries

Administration
- Archdiocese: Mechelen–Brussels

Clergy
- Archbishop: Luc Terlinden (Primate of Belgium)

The Church of St. Clement (French: Église Saint-Clément; Dutch: Sint-Clemenskerk) is a Catholic church in Watermael-Boitsfort, a municipality of Brussels, Belgium. It is one of the earliest examples of Romanesque architecture in Belgium, dating from the 11th century. It is dedicated to Saint Clement.

== History ==
The oldest parts of the church, the nave and bell tower, date from the 11th century. The building, which originally had a basilica plan, was enlarged in the 15th century by the addition of a transept and a late Gothic choir.

The municipality's second church, the Church of St. Philomena, was built in 1826.

Various architectural features were added to the church when it was restored in 1871, during which work a number of historic tombstones were recovered.

The church was designated a historic monument on 22 November 1949.

== See also ==
- List of churches in Brussels
- Catholic Church in Belgium
- History of Brussels
- Culture of Belgium
- Belgium in the long nineteenth century
