= Sonian Forest =

Forest at the south-eastern edge of Brussels, Belgium

Sonian Forest Dutch: Zoniënwoud French: Forêt de Soignes
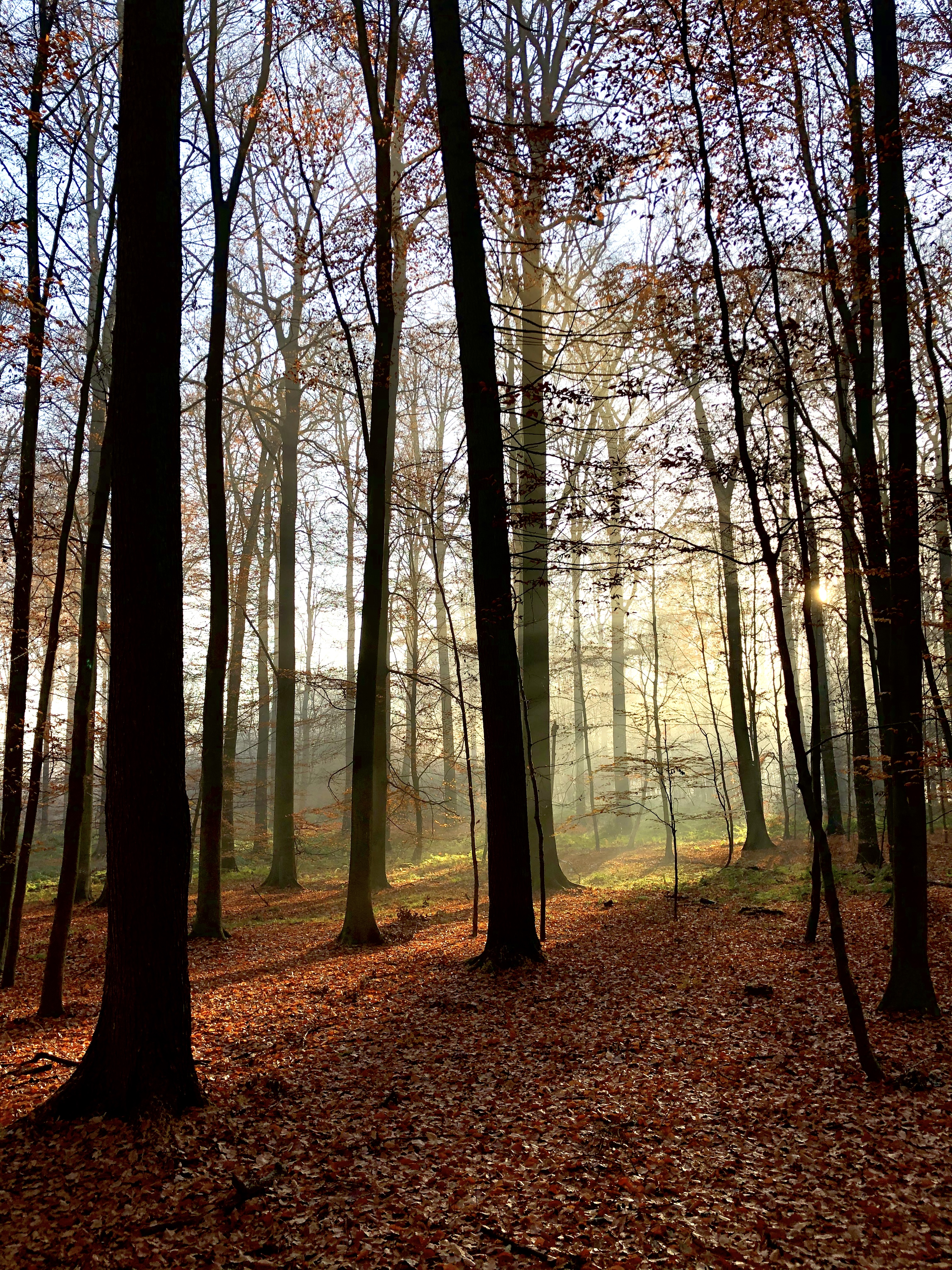
- Autumn light in the Sonian Forest

- Location within Belgium

Geography
- Location: Belgium
- Coordinates: 50°46′N 4°25′E
- Area: 4,421 ha (10,920 acres)

The Sonian Forest or Sonian Wood (Dutch: Zoniënwoud, pronounced [ˈzoːnijə(ɱ)ʋʌut]; French: Forêt de Soignes, pronounced [fɔ.ʁɛ d(ə) swaɲ]) is a 4,421-hectare (10,920-acre) forest at the south-eastern edge of Brussels, Belgium. It is connected to the Bois de la Cambre/Ter Kamerenbos, an urban public park which enters the city up to 4 kilometres (2.5 mi) from the city centre.

The forest lies in the Flemish municipalities of Sint-Genesius-Rode, Hoeilaart, Overijse, and Tervuren, in the Brussels-Capital Region municipalities of Uccle, Watermael-Boitsfort, Auderghem, and Woluwe-Saint-Pierre, and in the Walloon towns of La Hulpe and Waterloo. Thus, it stretches out over the three Belgian Regions. It is maintained by Flanders (56%), Brussels (38%), and Wallonia (6%). There are some contiguous tracts of privately held forest and the Kapucijnenbos, the "Capuchin Wood", which belongs to the Royal Trust.

As of 2017, parts of the Sonian Forest have been inscribed as a UNESCO World Heritage Site, the only Belgian component to the multinational inscription 'Primeval Beech Forests of the Carpathians and Other Regions of Europe', because of their undisturbed nature and testimony to the ecological processes governing forests in Europe since the Last Glacial Period.

== History ==
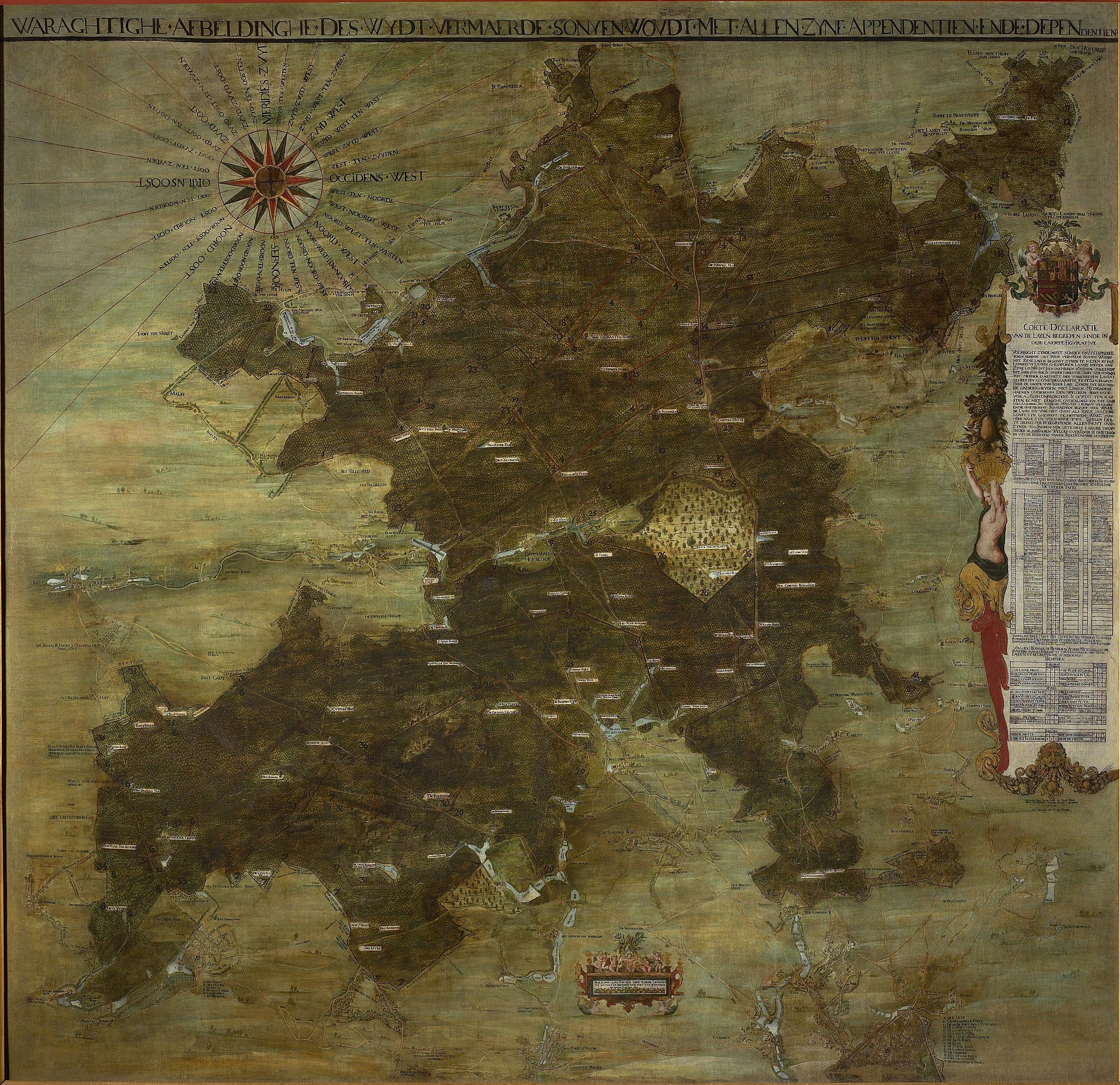
Painted map of the Sonian Forest (Ignatius van der Stock, 1661)

The forest is part of the scattered remains of the ancient Silva Carbonaria or Charcoal Forest. Originally, it was part of the Forest of Ardennes, the Romans' Arduenna Silva. The first mention of the Sonian Forest (Soniaca Silva) dates from the early Middle Ages. Then the forest south of Brussels was crossed by the river Senne/Zenne and extended as far as Hainaut, covering most of the high ground between the Senne and the Dyle/Dijl. The 9th-century vita of Saint Foillan mentions "the forest, next to the abbey of Saint Gertrude, called the Sonesian". In the Middle Ages, the forest extended over the southern part of Brabant up to the walls of Brussels and is mentioned, under the name of Ardennes, in Byron's Childe Harold. In the 16th century, it was still seven leagues in circumference, and even at the time of the French Revolution, it was very extensive.

At the start of the 19th century, the Sonian Forest was still more than twice its current size, about 25,000 acres (100 km^{2}), but due to deforestation in the ensuing 1800s, it diminished to its current 10,920 acres (44.2 km^{2}). A major blow towards this 19th-century contraction was struck when Napoleon ordered 22,000 oaks to be cut down to build the Boulogne flotilla intended for the invasion of England. King William I of the Netherlands continued to harvest the woods, and from 29,000 acres (120 km^{2}) in 1820, the forest was reduced to 11,200 acres (45 km^{2}) in 1830. Rights to a considerable portion of the forest in the neighbourhood of Waterloo was assigned in 1815 to the Duke of Wellington, who had become Prince of Waterloo in the Dutch nobility, and received the equivalent of about $140,000 today from his Belgian properties. This portion of the forest was only converted into farms in the time of the second duke. The Bois de la Cambre/Ter Kamerenbos (456 acres or 185 hectares) on the outskirts of Brussels was formed out of the forest in 1861. In 1911, the forest still stretched to Tervuren, Groenendaal, and Argenteuil close to Mont-Saint-Jean and Waterloo.

Formerly, the forest held Saint Foillan Abbey not far from Nivelles. The forest served for a long period as an exclusive hunting ground for the nobility, but today is open to the general public. In the 20th century, broad automobile roads and motorways were cut directly into the forest, crossing it in multiple directions and dividing the previously contiguous green space that traditionally contained only narrower roads and pathways. These modern paved systems include local thoroughfare avenues connecting nearby municipalities as well as the long distance traffic of the Brussels Ring (R0).

== Ecology ==
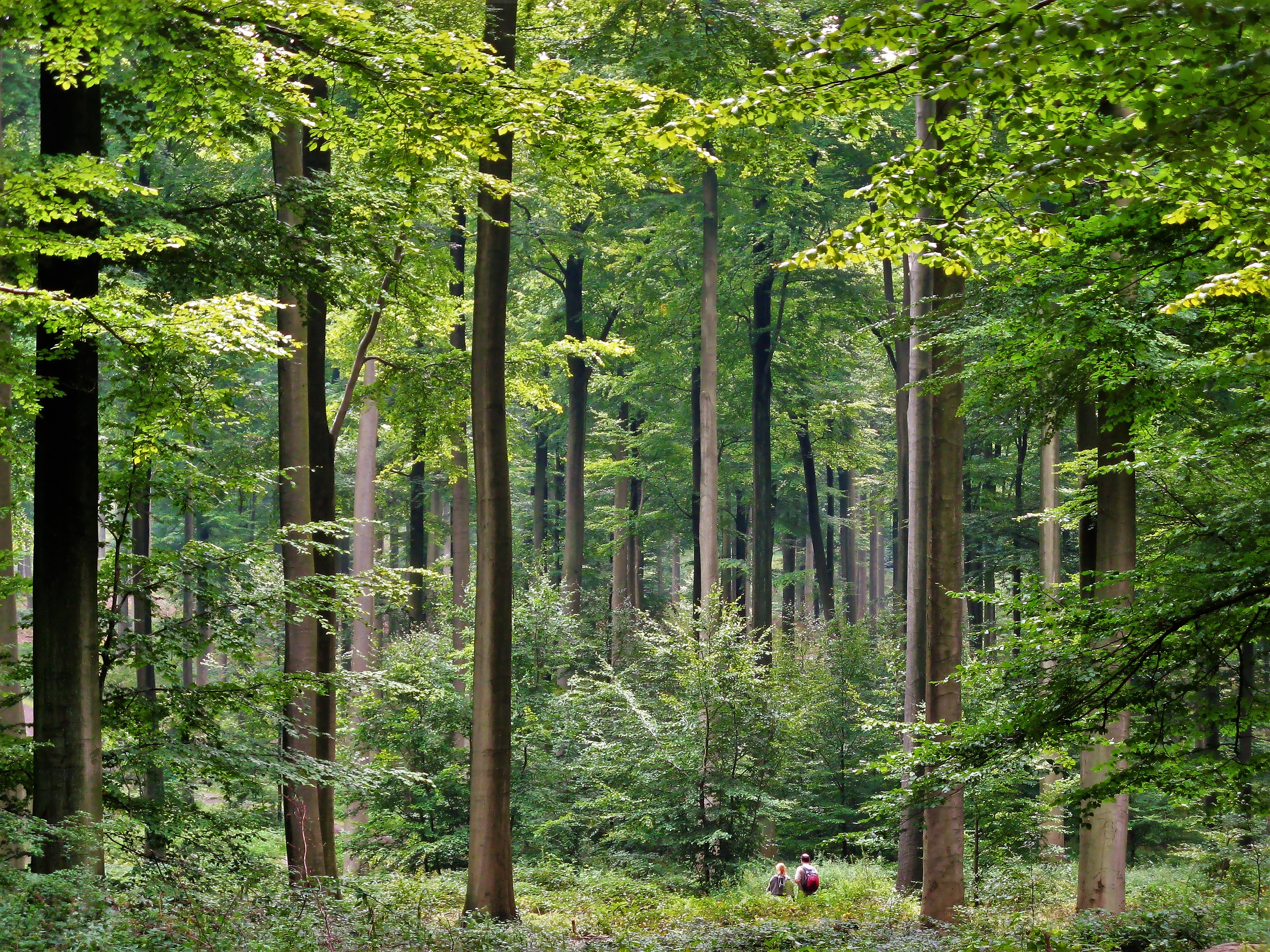
Even, dense old-growth stand of beech trees (Fagus sylvatica) prepared to be regenerated by their saplings in the understorey, in the Brussels part of the Sonian Forest

The Sonian Forest consists mainly of European beeches and oaks. Several trees are more than 200 years old, dating from the Austrian period.

The forest contains a somewhat reduced fauna and flora. Due to human influence (encroachment from all sides of the outer edges as well as the long-established thoroughfare roads and motorways cutting deep through the forest) and impoverishment of the ecosystem, various plants and animals have become extinct. The forest was home to 46 different mammal species. Of these, seven have disappeared altogether: the brown bear (around 1000), the wolf (around 1810), the hazel dormouse (around 1842), the red deer, the badger and the hare. Stag beetles have also disappeared from the forest. The boar was thought to have been extinct since 1957, but in 2007, new specimens were discovered roaming the wood. According to the Flemish Agency for Nature and Forest (ANB), this is unlikely to be a natural spread, but probably two to four animals that most likely were either released or escaped from captivity.

The many species of bat in the forest led to it being classified as a Natura 2000 protected site. This includes five endangered species: the mouse-eared bat, Geoffroy's bat, the barbastelle bat, the pond bat and Bechstein's bat. Other animal species found in the forest, including the black woodpecker and the great crested newt, are considered endangered and are protected by the European Habitats Directive.

In 2016, the Sonian Forest joined the "European Rewilding Network", an initiative of the Rewilding Europe organisation. The project aims to enable the growth in numbers of natural fauna such as roe deer and wild boar. Various types of wildlife crossings have been or are due to be constructed to reconnect the areas of the forest that are currently divided by large roads. A 60-metre-wide (200 ft) wildlife crossing ('Ecoduct') has been built across the Brussels Ring (R0); construction started in 2016 and it was opened in June 2018.

== Real estate projects ==
The edge of the Soignes forest is the subject of ongoing legal proceedings initiated by the Friends of the Soignes forest against real estate projects threatening this natural heritage.

== Attractions ==
- A museum has been set up in the building of the old farm of the Groenendael Priory. The Bosmuseum Jan van Ruusbroec or Musée de la Forêt ('Forest Museum') presents displays about the flora, fauna, history of the forest, and forest management.
- The remains of the Château de Trois-Fontaines. In this location, at the time unsafe, Duke John III of Brabant had a fortified refuge built in 1323, surrounded by a moat and flanked by a keep and a chapel. At the beginning of the 15th century, after the addition of a new building, the small fort became the residence of the gruyer, the officer responsible for watching over the dukes' hunting grounds. Poachers were locked up there and a small garrison also had its quarters there. In 1584, a fire destroyed the keep, which was rebuilt. The current building dates from this period. The keep and other buildings were destroyed at the beginning of the 19th century.
- The memorial to the forest rangers. This monument, consisting of a dolmen surrounded by a circle of eleven standing stones, was erected in 1920 in memory of eleven forest rangers killed during the First World War.
- The Tervuren Arboretum, which can be considered a living monument since it is made up of numerous species of trees imported in the 19th century from various countries to be acclimatised in Belgium.
- The memorial to the victims of the 2016 Brussels bombings at Maelbeek metro station and Brussels Airport called Memorial 22/03, located on the Drève de l'Infante/Infantedreef. 32 birches (one for each victim) were planted in their memory. The memorial's designer is the landscaper Bas Smets. Smets describes the memorial as "a place of silence and meditation." The birches are connected by a circular structure and separated from the rest of the forest by a small round canal.
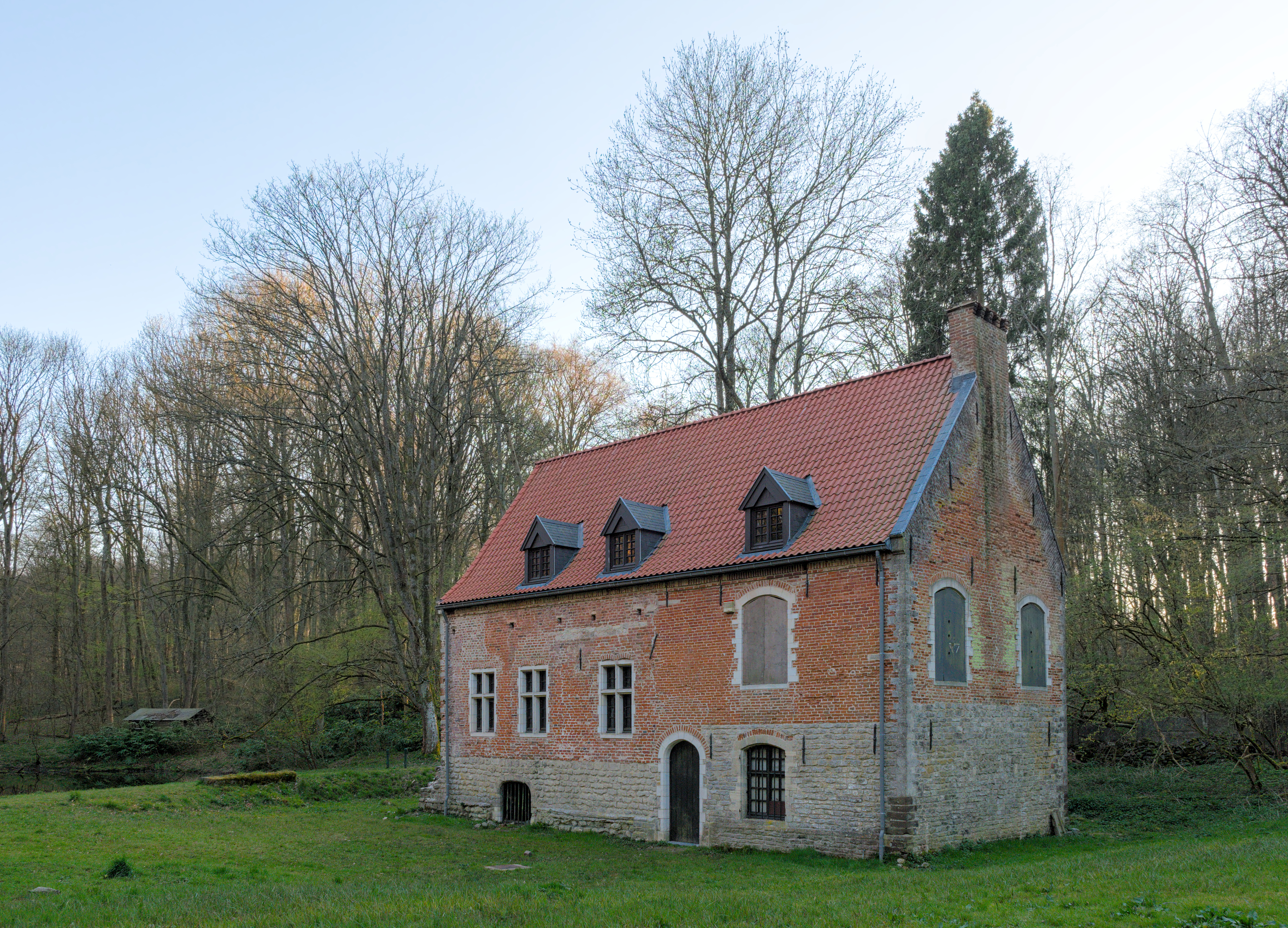
The only remaining building of the Château de Trois-Fontaines

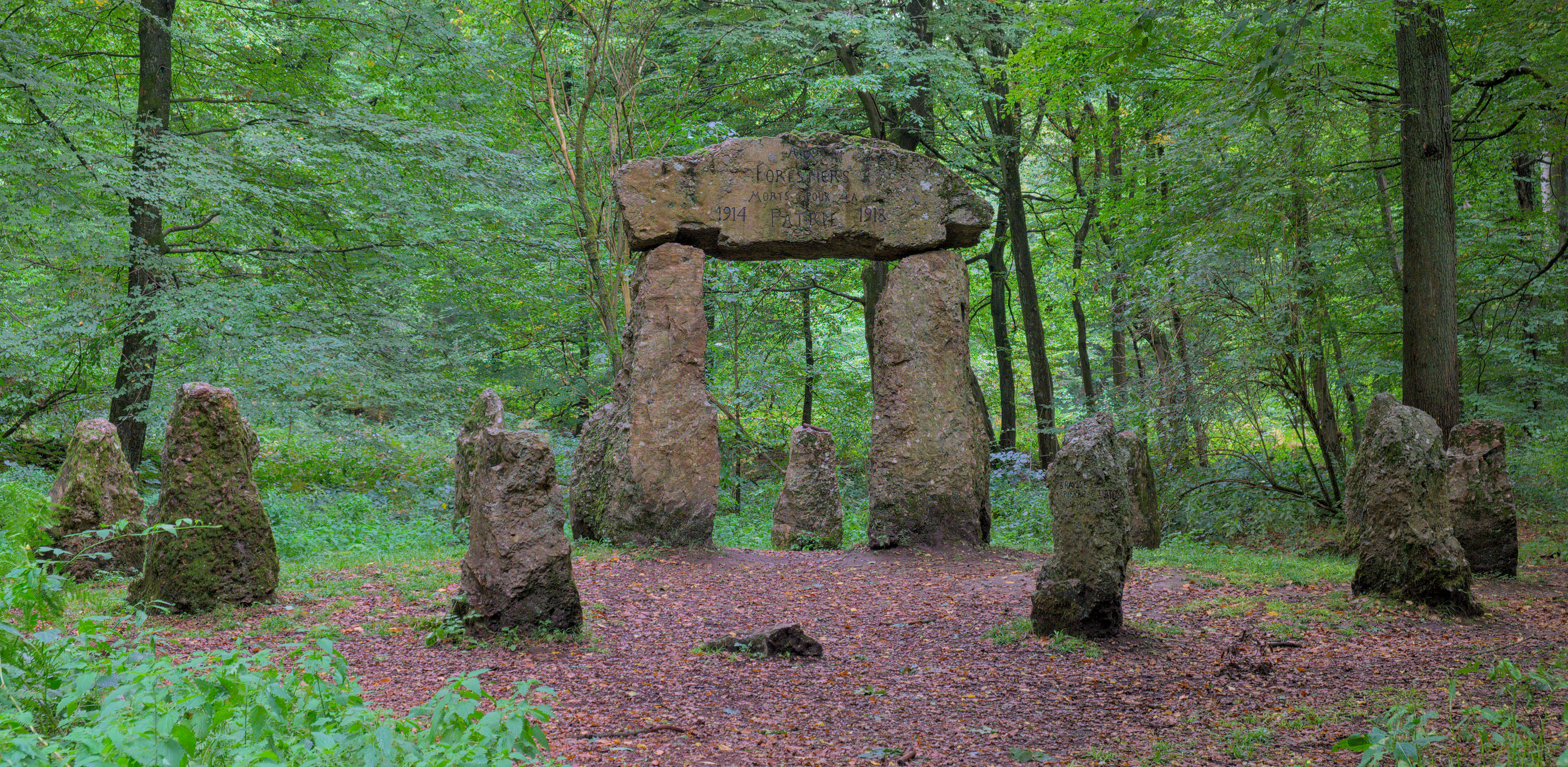
Memorial to the eleven forest rangers

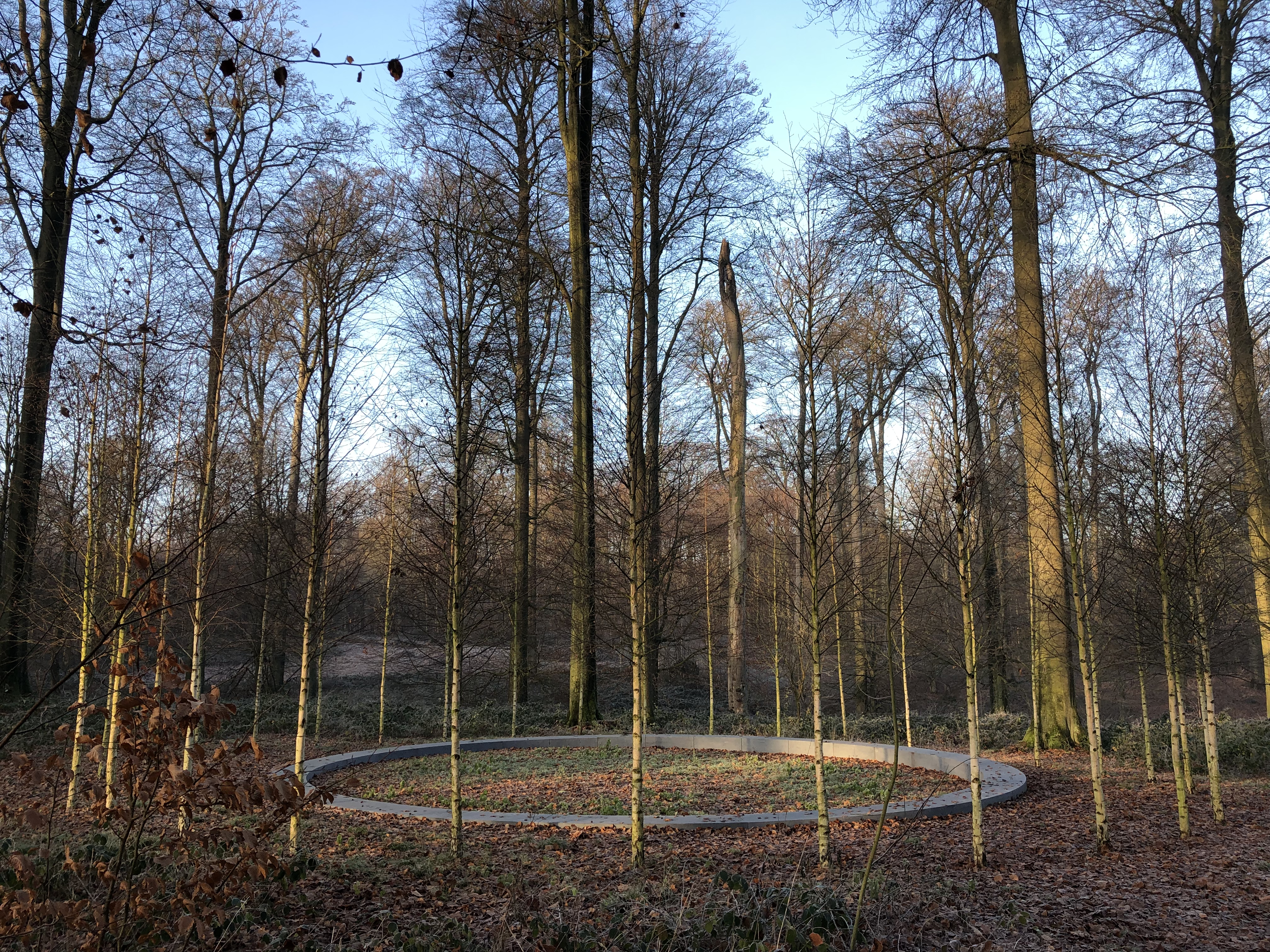
Memorial to the victims of the 2016 Brussels bombings

== Monasteries and contemplative traditions ==
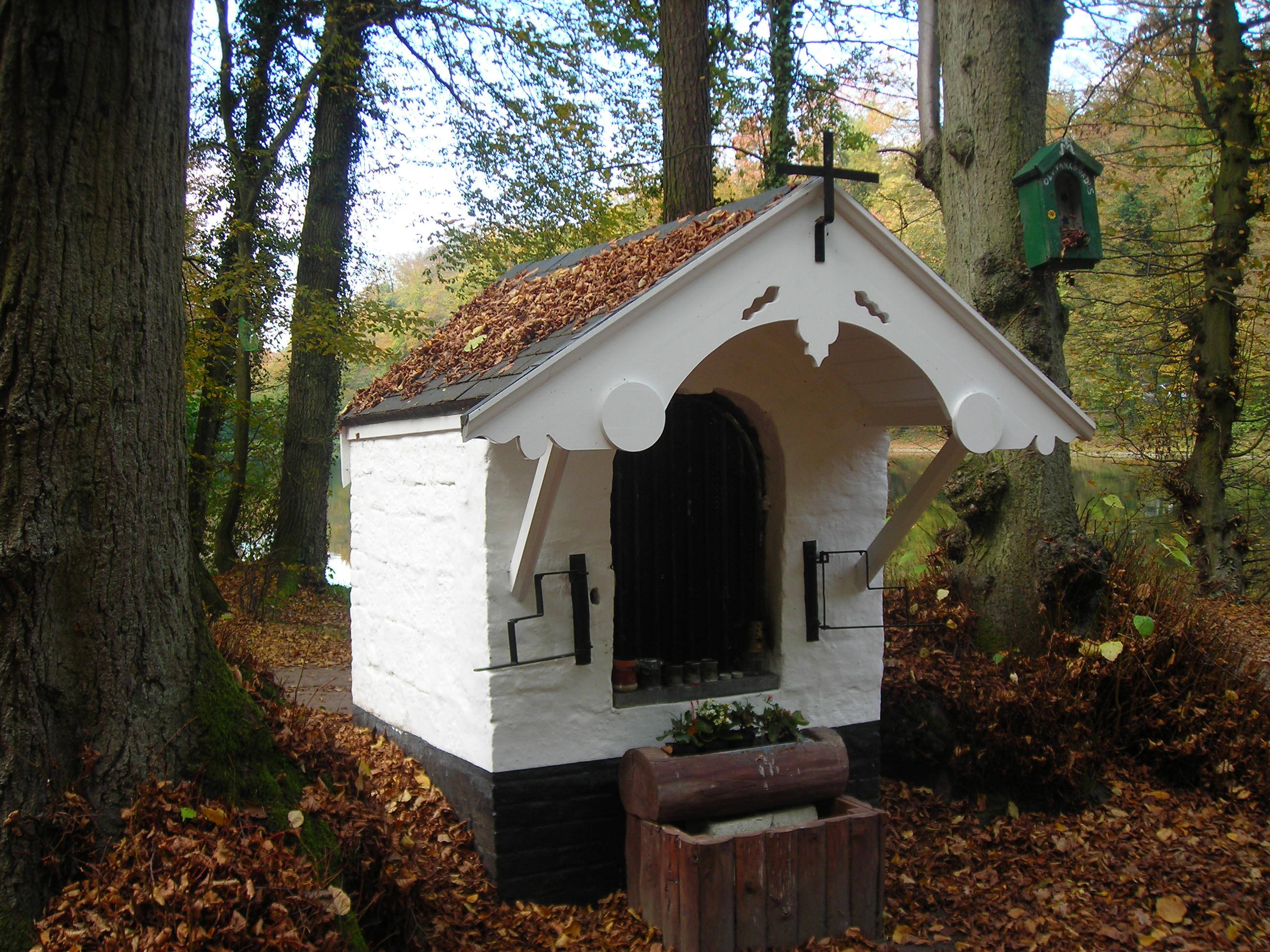
Small chapel in the Sonian Forest near the site of the monastery of John of Ruysbroeck at Groenendaal

Amongst the contemplative monks and nuns who lived and prayed in the forest, the most notable was John of Ruysbroeck who established a Monastery near Groenendaal at Vauvert. At this time, the forest also held a house of Cistercian nuns at Pennebeek (founded 1201 on land given by Duke Henry I of Brabant to Sister Gisle); a convent of Benedictine nuns at Forest (founded in 1107 by Gilbert de Gand) and a cloister of Dominican sisters at Val Duchesne (founded 1262 the Duchess Aleyde).

== In popular culture ==
=== Art ===
- The Sonian Forest was historically a favourite hunting ground of the Habsburg imperial family, and features prominently in some Renaissance artworks, such as the Hunts of Maximilian tapestries in the Louvre.
- Auguste Rodin made frequent trips to the forest while living in Brussels in the 1870s; he made several paintings of the forest during this time.

=== Literature ===
The forest features is several works of literature including:

- Byron's Childe Harold's Pilgrimage
- Victor Hugo's Les Misérables
- Sir Walter Scott's The Field of Waterloo

== Battle of Waterloo ==
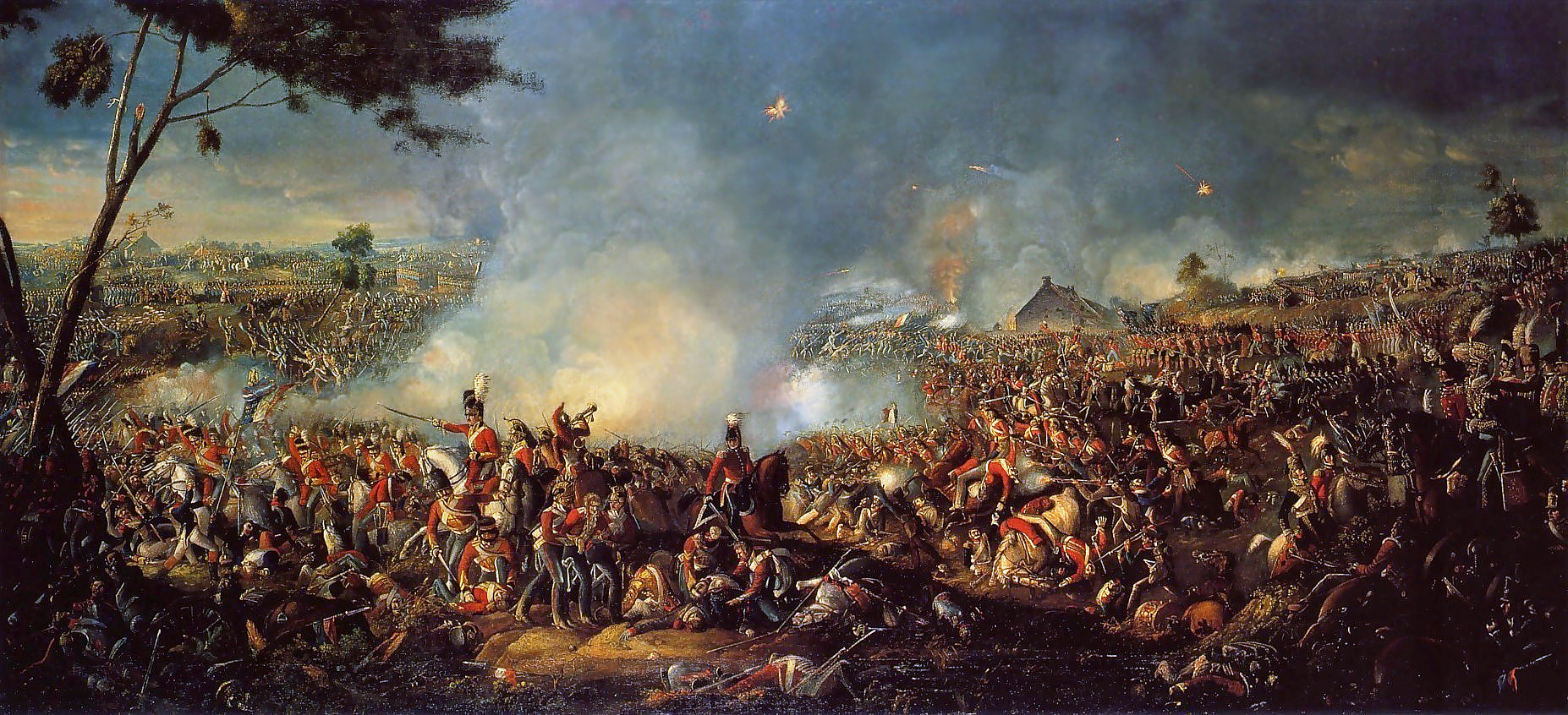
The Battle of Waterloo

The Forest of Soignes lay behind the Anglo-allied army of the Duke of Wellington at the Battle of Waterloo. From Roman times, it had generally been seen as a tactical blunder to position troops for battle in front of woodland because it hampers their ability to retreat. Napoleon in Mémoires pour servir à l'histoire de France en 1815, avec le plan de la bataille de Mont-Saint-Jean repeatedly criticised the Duke of Wellington's choice of battle field because of the forest to his rear.

On page 124, Bonaparte wrote, "He had in his rear the denies of the forest of Soignes, so that, if beaten, retreat was impossible", and on page 158 — "The enemy must have seen with affright how many difficulties the field of battle he had chosen was about to throw in the way of his retreat", and again on page 207 — "The position of Mont-Saint-Jean was ill-chosen. The first requisite of a field of battle, is, to have no defiles in its rear. The injudicious choice of his field of battle, rendered all retreat impossible." However, Napoleon's view was contradicted by Jomini, who pointed out that Wellington had good roads behind his centre and each wing which would have made a retreat through the forest safer than across an open field: Napoleon's cavalry would have been hampered by the forest in their attempts to turn any retreat into a rout. Some have argued that there was no bottom to the forest and it would not have hampered an extraction given Wellington's superlative expertise in handling an army disengaging from the enemy, while others have suggested that Wellington if pressed intended to retreat eastwards towards Blücher's Prussian army so the interior of the wood was of little military significance.

== Gallery ==
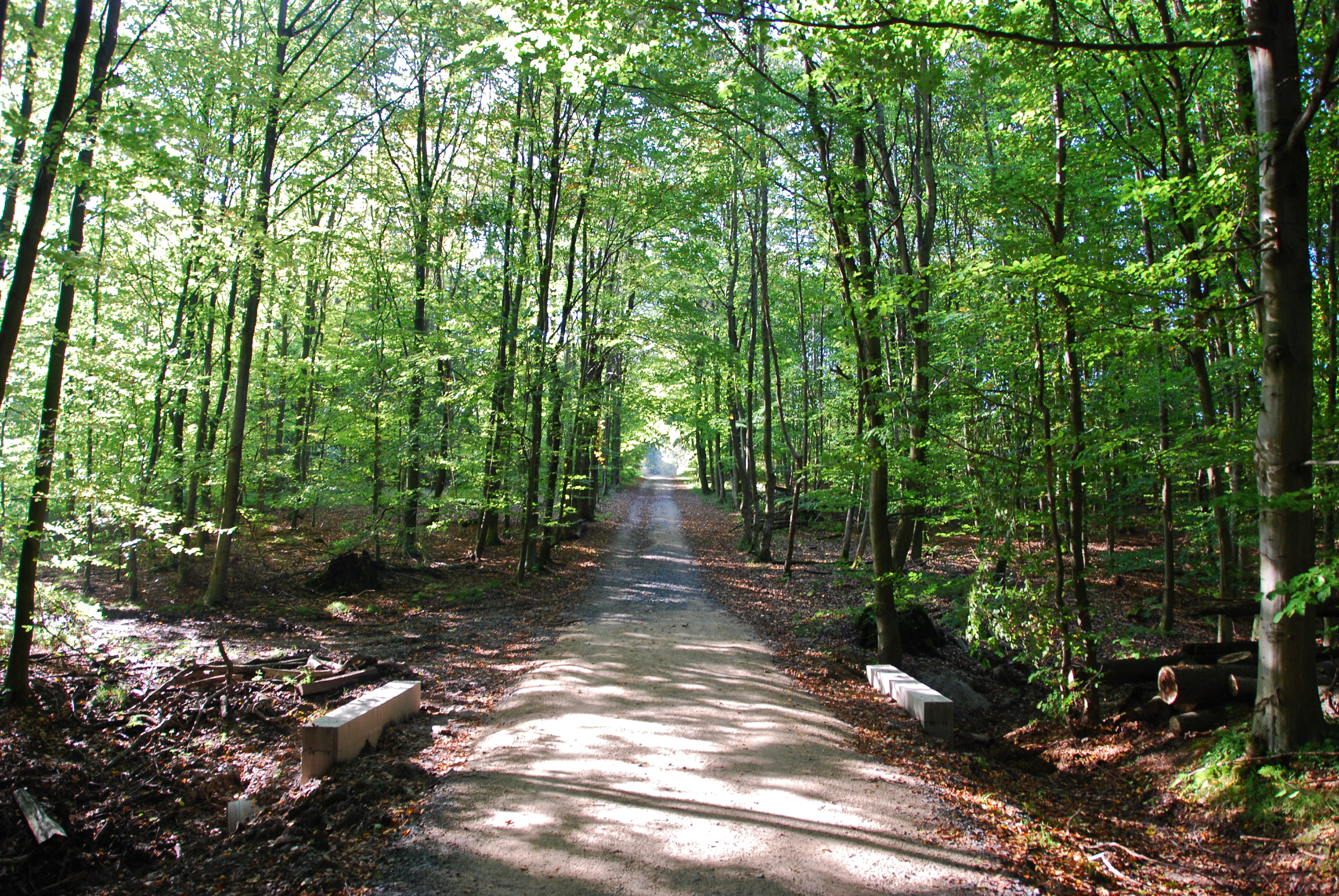
A path in the Sonian Forest

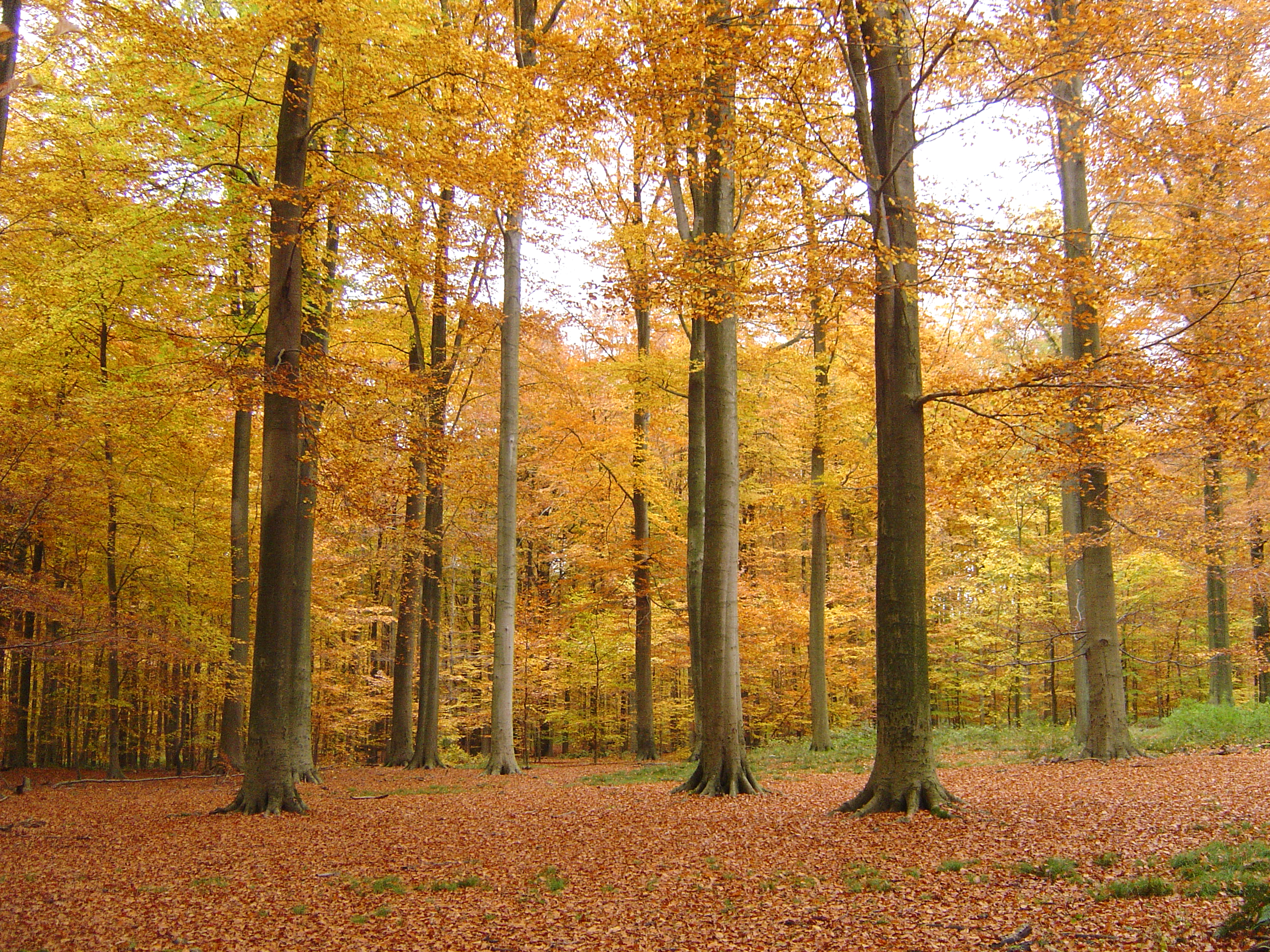
The Sonian Forest in the autumn

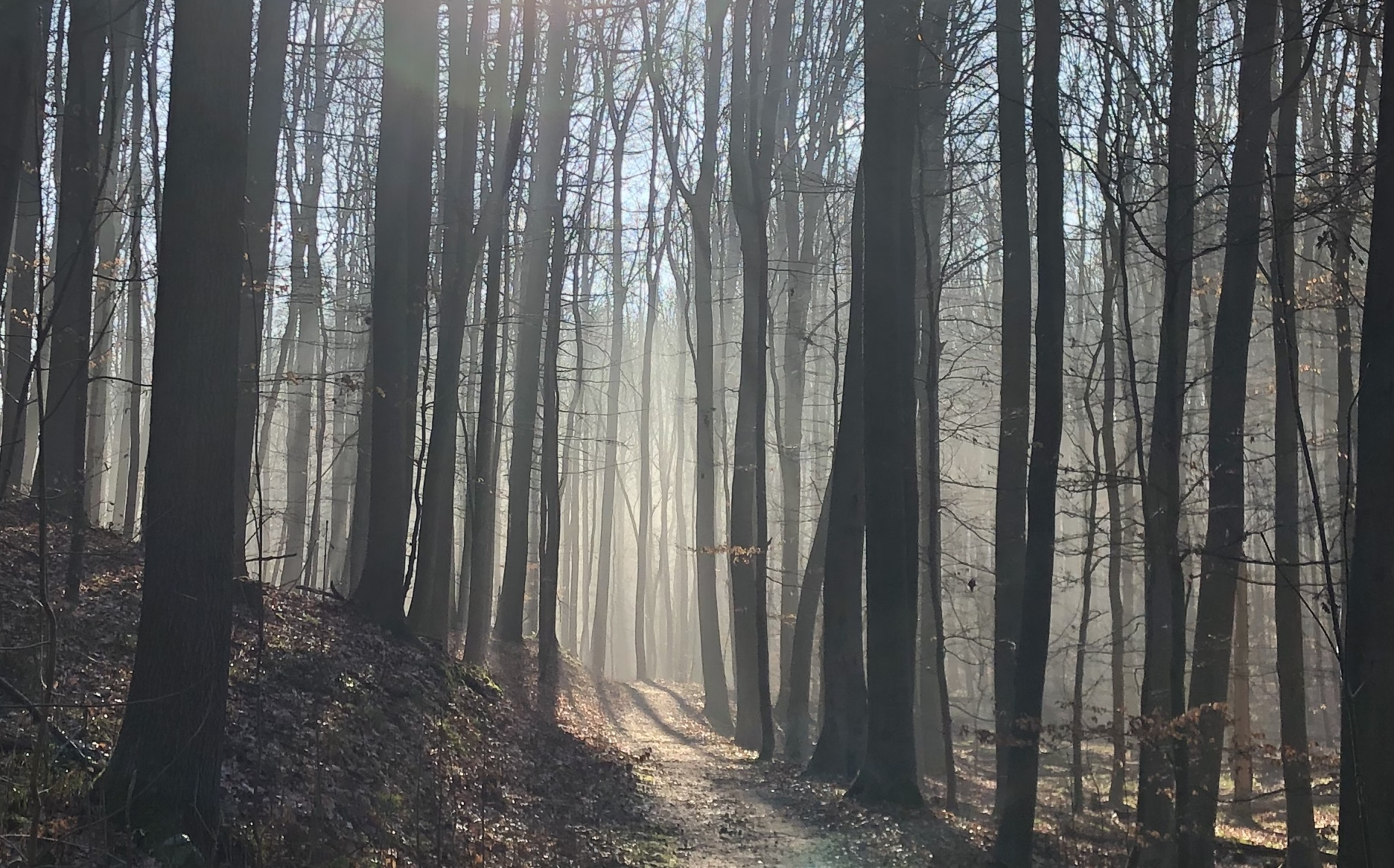
Winter light in the Sonian Forest

== See also ==
- Enfants Noyés Nature Reserve, a nature reserve in the Sonian Forest
- List of Waterloo Battlefield locations
- Rouge Cloître
- Soignes Forest Railway
