= Groenendaal =

Groenendaal is a surname. Notable people with the surname include:

- Jacobus Groenendaal (1805–1860), South African politician
- Reinier Groenendaal (born 1951), Dutch cyclo-cross cyclist
- Richard Groenendaal (born 1971), Dutch cyclo-cross cyclist, son of Reinier
