= Battle of Vottem =

The battle of Vottem of 18 July 1346 was the first major engagement of the Liégeois revolt of 1345–1347, in which an entrenched force of infantry routed an elite cavalry formation, slaughtering 57 knights in the process.

The cause of the revolt was the election of Engelbert von der Mark as prince-bishop of Liège on 23 February 1345. He was the nephew of his predecessor, Adolf von der Mark, who in 1343 had repealed the constitution he had been forced to concede in 1330–1331. At Engelbert's election, both sides, citizens and bishop, began gathering armies and preparing for war.

== Primary sources ==
The battle of Vottem was widely reported in contemporary sources. The major contemporary accounts are those of Jean le Bel and Mathias von Neuenberg, as well as the Récits d'un bourgeois de Valenciennes and Chronique de l'abbaye de Saint-Trond. Shorter contemporary accounts are found in Levold von Northof, Giovanni Villani, Johannes von Winterthur, Jean de Hocsem, Heinrich von Diessenhofen, Heinrich von Rebdorf, the Lübecker Ratschronik, the Notae Colonienses, the Annales Agrippinenses, the Brabantsche Yeesten of Jan van Boendale, the Miroir des nobles de Hesbaye of Jacques de Hemricourt and the Vita Clementis VI of Werner von Haselbeck.

Among later accounts, that of Jean d'Outremeuse is the most important. It is based in part on eyewitnesses and is found spread across three separate works: his chronicle, Chronique abrégêe; a poem dedicated to the battle, Delle batalhe à Votemme; and his world history, Ly Myreur des Histors.

== Order of battle ==
Only one source estimates the size of the rebel army. Mathias von Neuenberg puts it at 40,000 soldiers. It include men from Huy, Dinant and Bouvignes. Other than the mayor of Liège, Arnoul de Hautepenne, the rebel ranks contained only four knights: Godefroid de Harduemont, Louis d'Agimont, Jean de Borgneval and Walthier de Hautepenne. According to the Récits d'un bourgeois de Valenciennes, the rebels were armed mainly with axes and hammers, some of iron or steel but others of bronze or lead.

Mathias von Neuenberg estimates the size of the bishop's army at 9,000 soldiers, far smaller than the rebel force. Jean le Bel makes the discrepancy even larger, estimating that the bishop had only one twentieth of the troops available to the rebels. He says, however, that this included the "lords of Germany". Some of these lords known by name include the bishop's brother, Count Adolf II of Mark; the emperor's father, King John the Blind of Bohemia; Marquis William V of Jülich; Duke Reginald III of Guelders; Count Adolf VIII of Berg; Count William I of Namur; Diederik of Heinsberg, count of Loon; and Dirk IV of Valkenburg, burgrave of Zeeland. Besides these mounted men and their knights, the bishop did have foot soldiers.

== Description ==
Vottem was a suburb outside the walls of Liège, lying along the road from Tongeren. Learning that the bishop had gathering an army at Tongeren and was marching on Liège, the rebels prepared to make a stand at Vottem and prevent the bishop from entering the city. According to Johannes von Winterthur, the rebels' decision to fight beneath the city walls raised their morale. Jean de Hocsem dates the rebels' encampment to 16 July. Various sources attest that they dug trenches for cover.

The bishop's army arrived before Vottem on 18 July. The cavalry formed up in three lines and charged, "incautiously" according to Werner von Haselbeck. The defenders were in tight formation in their trenches. The Chronique de l'abbaye de Saint-Trond notes that the attackers were overconfident. When the cavalry charge descended into confusion, the defenders left their trenches but maintained a tight line. The disorganized cavalry was readily unhorsed by the defenders and the battle became a rout. The cavalry abandoned the infantry on the field. Only then did the rebels break ranks to cut down stragglers. Dirk IV of Valkenburg refused at first to retreat and was killed. According to the Récits d'un bourgeois de Valenciennes, the rebels took no prisoners.

== Aftermath ==
In total, 57 knights and over 300 infantry were killed in the bishop's army.

In 1347, Engelbert regained control of Liège at the battle of Tourinne, bringing the rebellion to an end.

== Works cited ==
- DeVries, Kelly (1996). Infantry Warfare in the Early Fourteenth Century: Discipline, Tactics, and Technology. Boydell.
- DeVries, Kelly (2006). "The Rebellions of Southern Low Countries' Towns During the Fourteenth and Fifteenth Centuries". In Wayne te Brake; Wim Klooster (eds.). Power and the City in the Netherlandic World. Brill. pp. 27–44. doi:10.1163/9789047418153_005.
- Gaier, Claude (1968). Art et organisation militaires dans la principauté de Liège et dans le comté de Looz au Moyen Âge. Brussels.
- Verbruggen, J. F. (1977). The Art of Warfare in Western Europe During the Middle Ages: From the Eighth Century to 1340. North Holland.
