= Teutonic =

Teutonic or Teuton(s) may refer to:

== Peoples and cultures ==
- Teutons, a specific Germanic or Celtic tribe mentioned by Greek and Roman authors
- Having qualities related to classical Germanic peoples generally (dated)
  - Furor Teutonicus, a Latin phrase referring to the proverbial ferocity of the Germanic peoples
  - Pertaining to Germanic languages or speakers of those languages (dated); see Theodiscus
- Pertaining to the Germanic or non-Latin part of the medieval Holy Roman empire
  - regnum Teutonicorum, "Kingdom of the Germans"
  - rex Teutonicorum, "King of the Germans"
  - Having qualities related to modern Germans or Austrians (poetic)
- Nordic race, a putative human sub-race discussed in the 19th to mid-20th centuries

== Other uses ==
- Teutonic Order, a German Catholic order
  - State of the Teutonic Order, the Northern European country it once formed
- Teutonic, West Virginia
- RMS Teutonic, a steam ship
