= Van Cotthem family =

Van Cotthem
- noble family
- Blazon: Argent, three bends gules (or azure).
- Parent family: House of Sweerts
- Country: Duchy of Brabant; Holy Roman Empire
- Place of origin: Brussels
- Founded: 14th century

The Van Cotthem family was an old patrician family of Brussels which exercised public functions in the capital of the Duchy of Brabant. Several of its members were aldermen of Brussels, and several were admitted to the Seven Noble Houses of Brussels. The family belonged to the House of Sweerts, the second of the Seven Noble Houses of Brussels.

== History ==
The family is said to stem from Jan van Cotthem, born around 1350. He was the father of Gozewijn van Cotthem. Gozewijn married Maria van Huldenberg. They had the following offspring: Gillis van Cotthem, alderman of Brussels from 1446 until 1465. He married Maria van Dyoen, who became a widow in 1479. The inheritance was finally divided in 1495. The sister of Gillis, Johanna van Cotthem, married Willem van Buyseghem. She lost her husband in 1406 and remarried to Frank van den Heede. Willem van Cotthem, the son of Gillis and Maria van Dyoen, was alderman of Brussels (having been admitted to the Sweerts).

Wein van Cotthem, a member of the family, was a chronicler best known for writing book six and seven of the Brabantsche Yeesten. Later, he also became canon of St. Vincent's Church (Sint-Vincentiuskerk) in Zinnik. He was probably both canon and chaplain.

It is possible that Wein secured the commission of the Brabantsche Yeesten from Petrus de Thimo thanks to his family that, like de Thimo's, was closely intertwined with Brussels administrative life.

The family belonged to the second of the seven noble houses of Brussels, the Sweerts, and several members held the office of alderman of Brussels.

== Genealogy ==
Jan van Cotthem(1350–?)

  - Gozewijn van Cotthem;
    married to Maria van Huldenberg.
    - Gillis van Cotthem, alderman of Brussels (1446-1465);
      Married to Maria van Dyoen.
      - Willem van Cotthem, alderman of Brussels
    - Johanna van Cotthem;
      Married to Willem van Buyseghem and Frank van den Heede.

=== Chronological list of van Cotthem admitted to the Seven Noble Houses of Brussels ===
- van Cotthem, Jan belonged to the Sweerts family in 1480.
- van Cotthem, Willem, not mentioned in the Sweerts family in 1480.
- van Cotthem, Jan, gen. Van den Bergh, admitted in 1487 to the Sweerts family.
- van Cotthem, Jan, admitted on 13 June 1504 to the Sweerts family.
- van Cotthem, Willem, admitted in 1523 to the Sweerts family.
- van Cotthem, Antoon, admitted in 1615 to the Sweerts family.

== See also ==
- Seven Noble Houses of Brussels
- Bourgeois of Brussels
