= Petrus de Thimo =

Petrus de Thimo, Latinized name of Peter van der Heyden (1393 – 26 February 1474), was a Brabantine chronicler and a lawyer employed by the City of Brussels, of which he became Pensionary in 1423. He is considered one of the most important 15th-century chroniclers of the Duchy of Brabant.

== Life ==
After training as a doctor, De Thimo studied law at the University of Cologne (registered in 1416). In 1423, he became pensionary of the City of Brussels, a post he held until 1465. As such, he was witness to the most important political events of his time, taking part in the most important political decisions. In 1434, the magistrate took him as spokesman. He supervised four chapels and became canon of St. Gudula in 1454, only to become treasurer of the chapter ten years later. Duke Philip the Good gave him two prebends (1452 and 1455).

De Thimo made his will in 1473 in the gruencamere of the Gheesthuys, a building near Sint-Goedele that was next to his own home. He died a few months later and left two children: Petrus, who became dean of Anderlecht, and Catharina, who married Hendrik van der Male and had a son Jan who became a chronicler himself (Johannes de Thimo).

== Work ==
Petrus De Thimo was the author of a Latin history of Brabant covering the years 330–1429. He wrote this two-volume Brabantiae historia diplomatica after his period as pensionary. In the first, largely fictitious part, he deals with history from Constantine the Great up to about 1106. The second, more historical part begins with a genealogy of the Carolingians and runs until 1429. Very valuable are the texts of privileges, statutes and charters that can be found included in the chronicle (about the Collegiate Church of St. Gudula, the City of Brussels and the Duchy of Brabant).

In addition, De Thimo commissioned a more famous chronicle, the continuation of Jan van Boendale's Brabantsche Yeesten (books 6–7). The author of this continuation, identified as Wein van Cotthem, drew from De Thimo's Brabantiae historia diplomatica, but also from his personal experiences.

In the same period, De Thimo wrote an overview of the Brussels chapels (Liber capellaniarum) and an ancient history that has not survived (De origine Trevirensium et Tungrorum).

The work Tractatulus de laude terre Brabancie has also been attributed to him, but this hypothesis was refuted in the 19th century. The author is now identified as Walter Bosch.

== Bibliography ==
- Jan-Frans Kieckens, "Pierre de Thimo", in: Annales de l'Académie royale d’archéologie de Belgique, reeks IV, vol. 9, 1896, p. 431-488 en vol. 10, 1897, p. 57-172
- Robert Stein, Politiek en historiografie. Het ontstaansmilieu van Brabantse kronieken in de eerste helft van de 15de eeuw, Leuven, 1994, p. 101-124
