= Theodiscus =

Latin term for Germanic language and customs

In Medieval Latin Theodiscus and Teutonicus were adjectives used to distinguish Germanic dialects and their speakers.

Theodiscus was a word borrowed directly from West Germanic itself. Words such as Old High German diutisc, and Old Saxon thiudisk, represented variants of a Proto-Germanic word *þiudiskaz which meant "of the people", applied to, among other things, vernacular language or people who spoke such a language. It was this meaning which was picked up and used in Latin documents. Teutonicus was an alternative Latin term which gradually became more popular. It was ultimately derived from the name of a second century BC Germanic tribe the Teutones, who fought the Roman Republic. Their name was apparently perceived as reflecting an older classical form of the same Germanic term as theodiscus.

In Medieval Western Europe Latin was the language of science, church and administration, hence Latin theodiscus and its Germanic counterparts were used as antonyms of Latin, to refer to the "native language spoken by the general populace". They were subsequently used in the Frankish Empire to denote the native Germanic vernaculars. As such, they were not always used as antonym of Latin, but of walhisk, which was a Germanic term for the Romance languages descended from Latin.

In the sense of being a word for a type of language, Latin teutonicus much later became an early equivalent of the modern linguistic concept of Germanic languages, while theodiscus and its Germanic reflexes resulted in modern terms for specific types of West Germanic, or their speakers, such as the English term "Dutch", for the language of the Netherlands and its speakers, the German word Deutsch for their own language and nationality, the modern Dutch word for "German", Duits, and the obsolete or poetic Dutch words for Dutch and its dialects such as diets. In Romance languages, forms of the same word yielded the Italian word for "German", tedesco, and the old French word used for speakers of Dutch or German dialects, tiois.

== Etymology ==
Theodiscus is derived from West Germanic *þiudisk, from Proto-Germanic *þiudiskaz. The stem of this word, *þeudō, meant "people" in Proto-Germanic, and *-iskaz was an adjective-forming suffix, of which -ish is the Modern English cognate with the same meaning. The Proto-Indo-European word *tewtéh₂ ("tribe", "people"), which is commonly reconstructed as the basis of the word, is related to Lithuanian tautà ("nation"), Latvian tauta ("nation"), Old Irish túath ("tribe", "people") and Oscan touto ("community").

The word existed in Old English as þēodisc ("speech", "public", 'native"), came into Middle English as thede ("nation", "people") and was extinct in Early Modern English, although surviving in the English place name Thetford, "public ford". It survives as the Icelandic word þjóð for "people, nation", the Norwegian word tjod for "people", "nation", and the word "German" in many languages including German Deutsch, Dutch Duits, Yiddish דײַטש, Danish tysk, Norwegian tysk, Swedish tyska and Italian tedesco.

From the 9th century the Latin term teutonicus was often used to translate theodiscus, and in the 10th and 11th century the term teutonicus gradually replaced theodiscus. While morphologically similar, is only distantly related, and originally derived from the name of a Celtic or Germanic tribe, the Teutones, who invaded southern Europe in the second century BC. It came probably via Celtic from Proto-Germanic *þeudanaz ("ruler", "leader of the people"), from *þeudō ("people, tribe"), from Proto-Indo-European *tewtéh₂ ("people", "tribe").

The word theodism, a neologism for a branch of Germanic neopaganism, is based on the Gothic form of the word, where þiudisko also took on the meaning of "pagan", a Judeo-Christian calque on similar formations such as "Gentile" from Latin gens ("people") and Hebrew goy, i.e. "belonging to (other) peoples". Proto-Slavic similarly borrowed the word as *ťuďь with the meaning "foreign", giving rise, for example, to modern Polish cudzy, Czech cizí, Serbo-Croat tuđi and Russian чужой.

The term must not be confounded with theodicy (from Ancient Greek θεός theos, "god" and δίκη dikē, "justice"), which, despite its phonetic resemblance, does not share any etymological origin and refers to an argument in the philosophy of religion that attempts to resolve the question of evil.

== Semantic development within medieval Latin ==
The Latin word theodiscus first appeared in the late 8th century, when it was used in the Carolingian Empire in various spelling forms, for example already beginning with t, or th, or d. It became more popular in the 9th century and was used in a wide variety of documents, always in the context of language, until about 1050. The meaning of adjective is “vernacular" or "in the vernacular”, but was in practice always used to contrast contemporary European Germanic speakers to Latin and to the Romance vernaculars.

The term was often used in the plural and although Carolingian scholars soon began to realize that this category of languages extended to the ancient Goths, and distant Scandinavians, they did not write as if this necessarily implied that they were all one single people. Haubrichs suggested that this way of thinking and writing began in Northern Italy in the 9th century, where people from north of the Alps were often present, and considered distinct from the more integrated local Lombards.

From the 9th century the Latin term teutonicus was seen as a classical Roman version of the same concept. For example, already in about 830 the ‘Teutons’ mentioned in Virgil’s Aeneid, were explained as "the people of Germania" and, it was indicated that they spoke lingua theodisca. Subsequently, in later centuries Teutonicus came to mean "German". In the 10th and 11th century the term teutonicus gradually replaced theodiscus. One reason for the term's popularity was that Regnum Teutonicum/ Teutonicorum/ Teutonum came to be the name of what historians now call the Kingdom of Germany, the mostly German-speaking core lands of the Holy Roman Empire.

Germania was also a Roman term known to the Carolingians, but it was initially only used geographically. Only in the 9th century is there mention of Germanica lingua. In the Heliand text the Heliand, written around 840/850 the theodisca lingua is distinguished from germanica lingua being the term used for the Saxon language used for the Heliand.

== Semantic development within English ==
Currently, the first known attestation of theodiscus is to be found in a letter written around the year 786 by the Bishop of Ostia. In the letter, the bishop writes to Pope Adrian I about a synod taking place in Corbridge, England; where the decisions were later read aloud elsewhere "tam Latine quam theodisce", meaning "in Latin as well as the vernacular / common tongue". Rendered in Old English as þēodisc, the term was primarily used as an adjective concerning the language of the laity. It was rarely used as a descriptor of ethnicity or identity, as the Anglo-Saxons referred to themselves as Seaxe, Iutas or Engle, respectively meaning Saxons, Jutes and Angles. The latter term would later give rise to the adjective Englisc, which during the Early Middle Ages became the term for all speakers of the Germanic dialects now collectively known as Old English.

By the late 14th century, þēodisc had given rise to Middle English duche and its variants, which were used as a blanket term for all the non-Scandinavian Germanic languages spoken on the European mainland. Historical linguists have noted that the medieval "Duche" itself most likely shows an external Middle Dutch influence, in that it shows a voiced alveolar stop rather than the expected voiced dental fricative. This would be a logical result of the Medieval English wool trade, which brought the English in close linguistic contact with the cloth merchants living in the Dutch-speaking cities of Bruges and Ghent, who at the time, referred to their language as dietsc.

Its exact meaning is dependent on context, but tends to be vague regardless. When concerning language, the word duche could be used as a hypernym for several languages (The North est Contrey which lond spekyn all maner Duche tonge — The North [of Europe] is an area, in which all lands speak all manner of "Dutch" languages) but it could also suggest singular use (In Duche a rudder is a knyght – In "Dutch" a rudder [cf. Dutch: ridder] is a knight) in which case linguistic and/or geographic pointers need to be used to determine or approximate what the author would have meant in modern terms, which can be difficult. For example, in his poem Constantyne, the English chronicler John Hardyng (1378–1465) specifically mentions the inhabitants of three Dutch-speaking fiefdoms (Flanders, Guelders and Brabant) as travel companions, but also lists the far more general "Dutchemēne" and "Almains", the latter term having an almost equally broad meaning, though being more restricted in its geographical use; usually referring to people and localities within modern Germany, Switzerland and Austria:

He went to Roome with greate power of Britons strong,
with Flemynges and Barbayns, Henauldes, Gelders, Burgonians, & Frenche,
Dutchemēne, Lubārdes, also many Almains.

— Excerpt from "Constantyne", John Hardyng
Translation:

He went to Rome with a large number of Britons,
with Flemings and Brabanters, Hainuyers, Guelders, Burgundians, and Frenchmen,
"Dutchmen", Lombards, also many Germans.

— J. Rivington, The Chronicle of Iohn Hardyng

By early 17th century, general use of the word Dutch had become exceedingly rare in Great Britain and it became an exonym specifically tied to the Dutch-speaking inhabitants of the Low Countries. Many factors facilitated this, including close geographic proximity, trade and military conflicts. Due to the latter, "Dutch" also became pejorative label pinned by English speakers on almost anything they regard as inferior, irregular, or contrary to their own practice. Examples include "Dutch treat" (each person paying for himself), "Dutch courage" (boldness inspired by alcohol), "Dutch wife" (a type of sex doll) and "Double Dutch" (gibberish, nonsense) among others.

In the United States, the word "Dutch" remained somewhat ambiguous until the start of the 19th century. Generally, it referred to the Dutch, their language or the Dutch Republic, but it was also used as an informal monniker (for example in the works of James Fenimore Cooper and Washington Irving) for people who would today be considered Germans or German-speaking, most notably the Pennsylvania Dutch. This lingering ambiguity was most likely caused by close proximity to German-speaking immigrants, who referred to themselves or (in the case of the Pennsylvania Dutch) their language as "Deutsch" or "Deitsch".

== Semantic development within Dutch ==
From Old Dutch *thiudisk a southern variant duutsc and a western variant dietsc developed in Middle Dutch. In the earliest sources, its primary use was to differentiate between Germanic and the Romance dialects, as expressed by the Middle Dutch poet Jan van Boendale, who wrote:

Want tkerstenheit es gedeelt in tween,
die Walsche tongen die es een,
Dandre die Dietsche al geheel

— Excerpt from "Brabantsche Yeesten", by Jan van Boendale (1318)
Translation:

Because Christendom is divided in two parts,
the Walloon languages (ie. Romance languages) form one,
the other [part] of the whole is "Dutch" (ie. Germanic)

During the High Middle Ages "Dietsc/Duutsc" was increasingly used as an umbrella term for the specific Germanic dialects spoken in the Low Countries, its meaning being largely implicitly provided by the regional orientation of medieval Dutch society: apart from the higher echelons of the clergy and nobility, mobility was largely static and hence while "Dutch" could by extension also be used in its earlier sense, referring to what to today would be called Germanic dialects as opposed to Romance dialects, in many cases it was understood or meant to refer to the language now known as Dutch. Medieval Dutch authors had a vague, generalised sense of common linguistic roots between their language and various German dialects, but no concept of speaking the same language existed. Instead they saw their linguistic surroundings mostly in terms of small scale regiolects.

The 15th century saw the first attested use of "Nederlandsch" (meaning Netherlandish, Lowlandish) alongside "Duytsch" (the Early Modern spelling of the earlier "Dietsc/Duutsc") as a term for the Dutch language and it would eventually manifest itself as the main ethnonym. The use of "low(er)" or "nether" in describing the area now known as the Low Countries has a long historical record. In the 13th century epic the Nibelungenlied, written in Middle High German, the protagonist Sigurd is said to hail from the city of Xanten in the "Niderlant", meaning the Low Countries. In Old French, the inhabitants of the Low Countries were known as the "Avalois", meaning "those of the [Rhine/Scheldt/Meuse] estuary"; compare contemporary French "en aval" and "à vau-l'eau" meaning "downstream". The Dukes of Burgundy referred to their Dutch possessions as "pays d'embas" (French: "lower lands") as opposed to their higher/upper territorial possessions in Burgundy itself, which was echoed in the Middle and Modern French "Pays-Bas" meaning "Low Countries".

In the second half of the 16th century the neologism "Nederduytsch" (literally: Nether-Dutch, Low-Dutch) appeared in print, in a way combining the earlier "Duytsch" and "Nederlandsch" into one compound. The term was preferred by many leading contemporary grammarians such as Balthazar Huydecoper, Arnold Moonen and Jan ten Kate because it provided a continuity with Middle Dutch ("Duytsch" being the evolution of medieval "Dietsc"), was at the time considered the proper translation of the Roman Province of Germania Inferior (which not only encompassed much of the contemporary Dutch-speaking area / Netherlands, but also added classical prestige to the name) and amplified the dichotomy between Early Modern Dutch and the "Dutch" (German) dialects spoken around the Middle and Upper Rhine which had begun to be called overlantsch of hoogdutysch (literally: Overlandish, High-"Dutch") by Dutch merchants sailing upriver. Though "Duytsch" forms part of the compound in both Nederduytsch and Hoogduytsch, this should not be taken to imply that the Dutch saw their language as being especially closely related to the German dialects spoken in Southerwestern Germany. On the contrary, the term "Hoogduytsch" specifically came into being as a special category because Dutch travelers visiting these parts found it hard to understand the local vernacular: in a letter dated to 1487 a Flemish merchant from Bruges instructs his agent to conduct trade transactions in Mainz in French, rather than the local tongue to avoid any misunderstandings. In 1571 use of "Nederduytsch" greatly increased because the Synod of Emden chose the name "Nederduytsch Hervormde Kerk" as the official designation of the Dutch Reformed Church. The synods choice of "Nederduytsch" over the more dominant "Nederlandsch", was inspired by the phonological similarities between "neder-" and "nederig" (the latter meaning "humble") and the fact that it did not contain a worldly element ("land"), whereas "Nederlandsch" did.

As the Dutch increasingly referred to their own language as "Nederlandsch" or "Nederduytsch", the term "Duytsch" became more ambiguous. Dutch humanists, started to use "Duytsch" in a sense which would today be called "Germanic", for example in a dialogue recorded in the influential Dutch grammar book "Twe-spraack vande Nederduitsche letterkunst", published in 1584:

R. ghy zeyde flux dat de Duytsche taal by haar zelven bestaat/ ick heb my wel laten segghen,
dat onze spraack uyt het Hooghduytsch zou ghesproten zyn.
S: Ick spreeck, met Becanus, int ghemeen vande duytse taal, die zelve voor een taal houdende.

— Excerpt from "Twe-spraack vande Nederduitsche letterkunst", by Hendrik Laurenszoon Spiegel (1584)
Translation:

R: You've just said that the Dutch language exists in its own right,
but I've heard it said that our language comes from High Dutch (ie. German)
S: I, like Becanus, speak of the Germanic language in general, considering it as one language.

Beginning in the second half 16th century, the nomenclature gradually became more fixed, with "Nederlandsch" and "Nederduytsch" becoming the preferred terms for Dutch and with "Hooghduytsch" referring to the language today called German. Initially the word "Duytsch" itself remained vague in exact meaning, but after the 1650s a trend emerges in which "Duytsch" is taken as the shorthand for "Hooghduytsch". This process was probably accelerated by the large number of Germans employed as agricultural day laborers and mercenary soldiers in the Dutch Republic and the ever increasing popularity of "Nederlandsch" and "Nederduytsch" over "Duytsch", the use of which had already been in decline for over a century, thereby acquiring its current meaning (German) in Dutch.

While "Nederduytsch" briefly eclipsed the use of "Nederlandsch" during the 17th century, it always remained a somewhat officious, literary and scholarly term among the general populace and steadily started to lose ground to "Nederlandsch" in print after 1700. When, in 1815, the United Kingdom of the Netherlands was proclaimed, it was specifically noted that the official language of the kingdom was "Nederlandsch" and that the Dutch Reformed Church, as the official State Church, would be known as the "Nederlandsch Hervormde Kerk" resulting in a profound drop in the already declining use of the word. The Dutch-speaking Cape Colony came under British control two years prior in 1814, resulting in the continued use of "nederduytsch" by the Dutch Reformed Church in South Africa in its official nomenclature to the present day. The disappearance of "Nederduytsch", left "Nederlandsch", first documented in the 15th century, as the sole ethnonym for the Dutch language.

The graph below visualises the decline of "Duytsch" and rise and decline of "Nederduytsch" as an ethnonym and the eventual dominance of "Nederlands":

In the late 19th century "Nederduits" was reintroduced to Dutch through the German language, where prominent linguists, such as the Brothers Grimm and Georg Wenker, in the nascent field of German and Germanic studies used the term to refer to Germanic dialects which had not taken part in the High German consonant shift. Initially this group consisted of Dutch, English, Low German and Frisian, but in modern scholarship only refers to Low German-varieties. Hence in contemporary Dutch, "Nederduits" is used to describe Low German varieties, specifically those spoken in Northern Germany as the varieties spoken in the eastern Netherlands, while related, are referred to as "Nedersaksisch". Likewise in the 19th century, the term "Diets" was revived by Dutch linguists and historians as a poetic name for Middle Dutch and its literature.

== Semantic development within German ==
In German dialects, various forms of "theodiscus" existed throughout the Middle Ages, being used either to describe the broader Romance/Germanic dichotomy in the West and South or the Slavic/Germanic border in the East.

An early example of this is the Council of Tours in 813, which ordered priests to stop preaching in Latin, but in rusticam romanam linguam aut theotiscam, quo facilius cuncti possint intellegere quae dicuntur ("in the colloquial Romance language (French) or in theotiscam (German), so that what is said can be understood better").

An even earlier recorded use of "theodisca" as a reference to a Germanic language was in 788, when the Annals of the Frankish Kingdom reported the punishment of a Bavarian duke: "quod theodisca lingua herisliz dictum", meaning "known in the language of the people as herisliz". Herisliz is a German word now obsolete: the "slicing", i.e. tearing apart of the "Heer" (Desertion).

The use of the word that would become "deutsch" in German is first found in Old High German in the Annolied, from 1077. Here the writer lists the Germanic tribes of the Bavarians, Franks, Swabians, Saxons and Thuringians and refers to them collectively as diutischi liuti (liuti meaning people), diutschi man and Ci Diutischimo lante (lante meaning land).

In Old High German both diutisk and diutisc are known, that developed in Middle High German as diutsc. In Middle Low German it was known as düdesch and Modern Low German as dütsch.

The term referring to Germans as a nation or people, as opposed to people speaking Continental Germanic languages in general, evolved during the Early Modern Period and it is only in the late 17th and 18th century that a relatively modern meaning of Deutsch is established. The foundation of the German Empire in 1871 began a process of further delineation, in which the meaning of "German" increasingly shifted to that of a nationality, rather than a mainly linguistic or cultural identity, which, during the previous century, would have included the Austrians and Swiss.

== See also ==
- The dictionary definition of theodiscus at Wiktionary
- The dictionary definition of "þiudiskaz" at Wiktionary
- Name of the Goths
- Furor Teutonicus
- Theodism
- Theodoric
- Teutons
- Túath
- Walha
