= Wein van Cotthem =

Brusselian clerk and chaplain

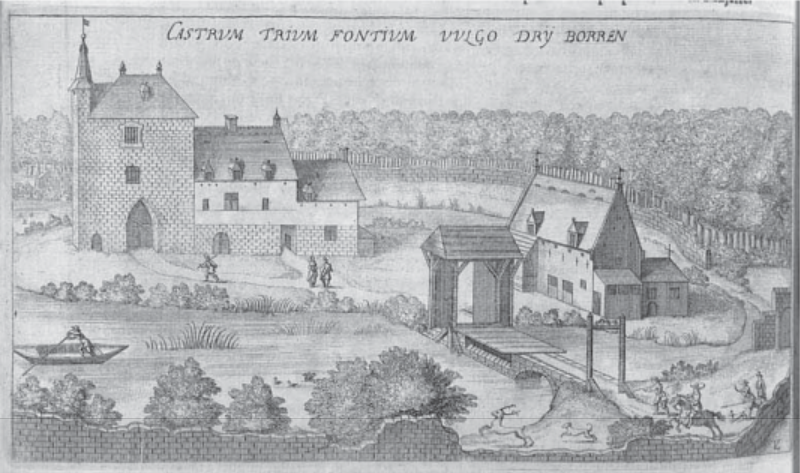
Castle Dry Borren, where Cotthem wrote

Wein van Cotthem (c. 1390 – July 1457) (alternative spellings: Iwein, Iweijn or Weinken; French: Ywanus de Cotthem) was a Brussels clerk, chaplain and chronicler.

He has been identified as the man who wrote a continuation of the Brabantsche Yeesten in the years 1430-1432. He added two books to the first five by Jan van Boendale, with a total of 12,000 verses. His autograph, now in the Royal Library of Belgium, would provide fodder for many later chroniclers.

The ducal court accounts first mention him in 1402 as a chorister (a jonghen clercken, singers op die capelle). He was ordained a priest and from 1429 was given the responsibility of the chapel of Dry Borren in the Sonian Forest, where he said mass four times a week. Nevertheless, he had two daughters: one by a nun in Brussels and another, Hélin, by his maidservant. He lived there in a house built against the keep.

He was a student of Petrus de Thimo and Emond de Dynter. Later he probably also became canon of St. Vincent's Church (Sint-Vincentiuskerk) in Zinnik.

The fact that Van Cotthem was chosen by De Thimo for the commission of the Brabantsche Yeesten might have to do with his acquaintance with the court. De Thimo could have come into contact with Van Cotthem through his family, which, like the Brussels pensionary's, was closely intertwined with Brussels administrative life: the Van Cotthem belonged to the second of the seven noble houses of Brussels, the Sweerts, and several members of the family held the office of alderman in Brussels.

== Bibliography ==
- Astrid Houthuys, Middeleeuws kladwerk. De autograaf van de Brabantse Yeesten, boek VI (vijftiende eeuw), Hilversum, Verloren, 2009, 370 blz.
