= Château of Trois-Fontaines =

Historic site in Brussels, Belgium

Coordinates: 50°48′24″N 4°26′44″E

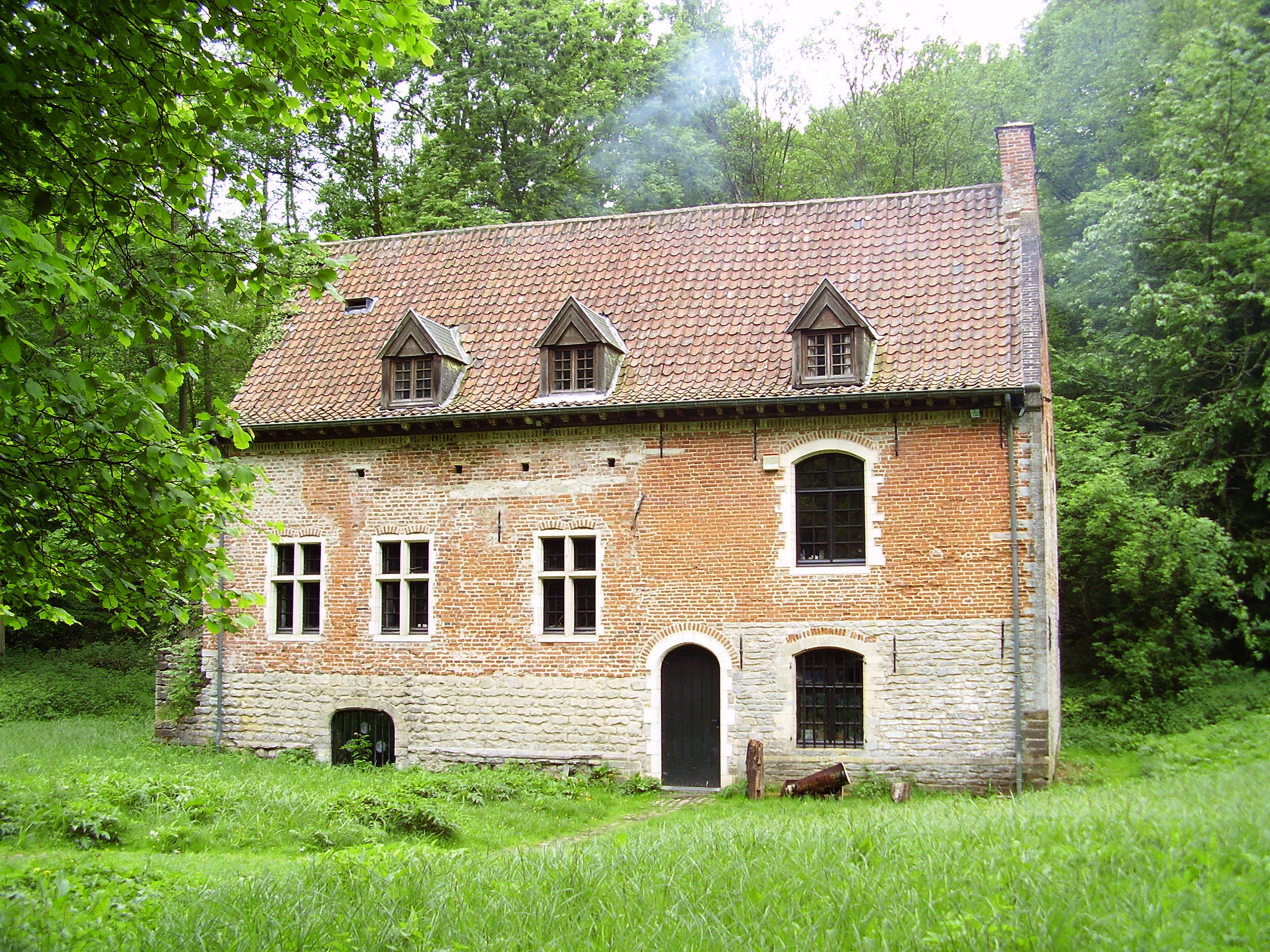
The château as it appears today

The Château of Trois-Fontaines (French: Château de Trois-Fontaines; Dutch: Kasteel Dry Borren) is a historic site in the Sonian Forest in the Brussels municipality of Auderghem, Belgium. It was originally a hunting lodge for the dukes of Brabant, built on a site where three springs originated. The Watermaelbeek stream flows alongside it.

== History ==
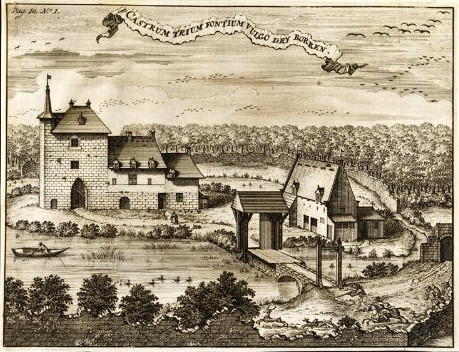
The château in 1532 (1659 engraving)

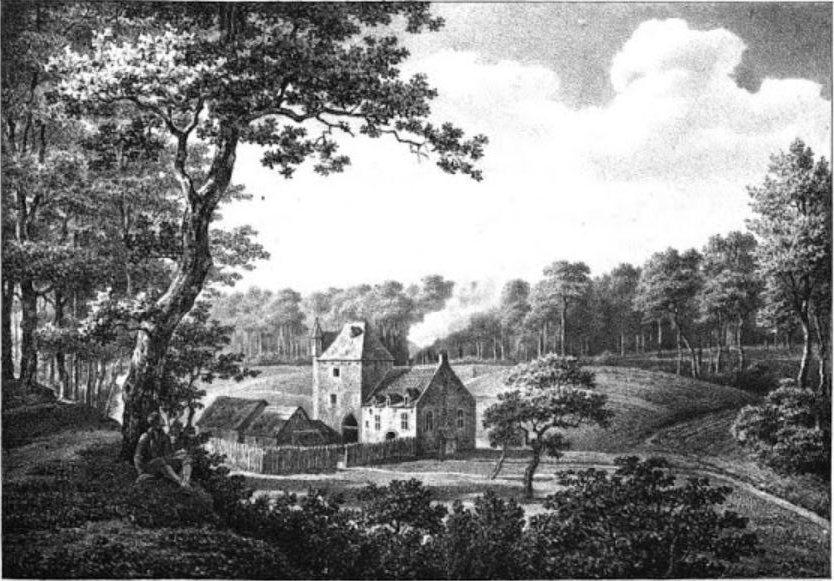
The site in 1802 (print after Paul Vitzthumb)

The first mention dates from 1321 and speaks of a hermitage. However, there was also a keep, founded by John II, Duke of Brabant. The castle is mentioned under the name of Trois-Fontaines (Dutch: Dryen Borren or Drie Borne) in 1329. In the Brabantsche Yeesten, it is told that Duke John III, Duke of Brabant brought a pot of metal there after the successful Siege of Valkenburg (1329). He also used the place for big game hunting. John had a tower and a square built in the hamlet by the name of Dry Borren in 1329. In the last year of his life, he founded a chapel there dedicated to the Virgin Mary and to Saint Catherine. The site also served as a prison. Poachers and wood gatherers were imprisoned there, but also robbers and political prisoners. Such practice is first documented from 1373. Dry Borren was also the residence of the Forest Judge (Dutch: Bosrechter).

In 1429, Wein van Cotthem became chaplain. He probably also lived at Dry Borren and it is there that he wrote his sequel to the Brabantsche Yeesten. However, the chapel had become so dilapidated that the celebrations were held in Bosvoorde. The church lost its benefice in 1446 to the Church of St. James on Coudenberg. The same year, the people of Liège were imprisoned at Dry Borren, but they escaped and the Council of Brabant granted them letters of safe-conduct so they could come to Brussels and assert their rights.

During the wars of religion, the domain was looted and destroyed. It was rebuilt under King Philip II of Spain, and a group of about thirty men, including horsemen, was assigned to patrol the domain. The prison was re-established. In 1659, a "bakehouse" was added. Around 1730, the Waversesteenweg, which ended at Dry Borren, was extended to Jezus-Eik. In 1793 the office of Bosrechter and the prison were abolished. The site came under the Dutch Société générale des Pays-Bas by order of King William I of the Netherlands in 1822. Soon, the dilapidated tower was demolished. The remains were sold via public sale. In 1825, the gate keep was demolished with some difficulty.

Starting from this period, Dry Borren was designated as "farm" in documents until the Belgian state took ownership in 1906. Thereafter, the site was turned into a "forest house" or boswachtershuis, with a forest worker and his family living there for a while. There was a work of restoration between 1973 and 1976. Thereafter, the non-profit association Le Conseil des Trois-Fontaines kept the residence and used the building as an exhibition space for some time. The remains of the castle received protected status through a royal decree issued on 19 November 1986. The Belgian state transferred ownership to the Brussels-Capital Region in 1991. It has been in disuse since 2008.

== Description ==
Only the foundations of the castle tower have been preserved. The adjacent building is more or less in the state it was rebuilt at the end of the 16th century. Inside, there is a monumental Gothic fireplace. The basement where the dungeons were located has also been preserved.

== Iconography ==
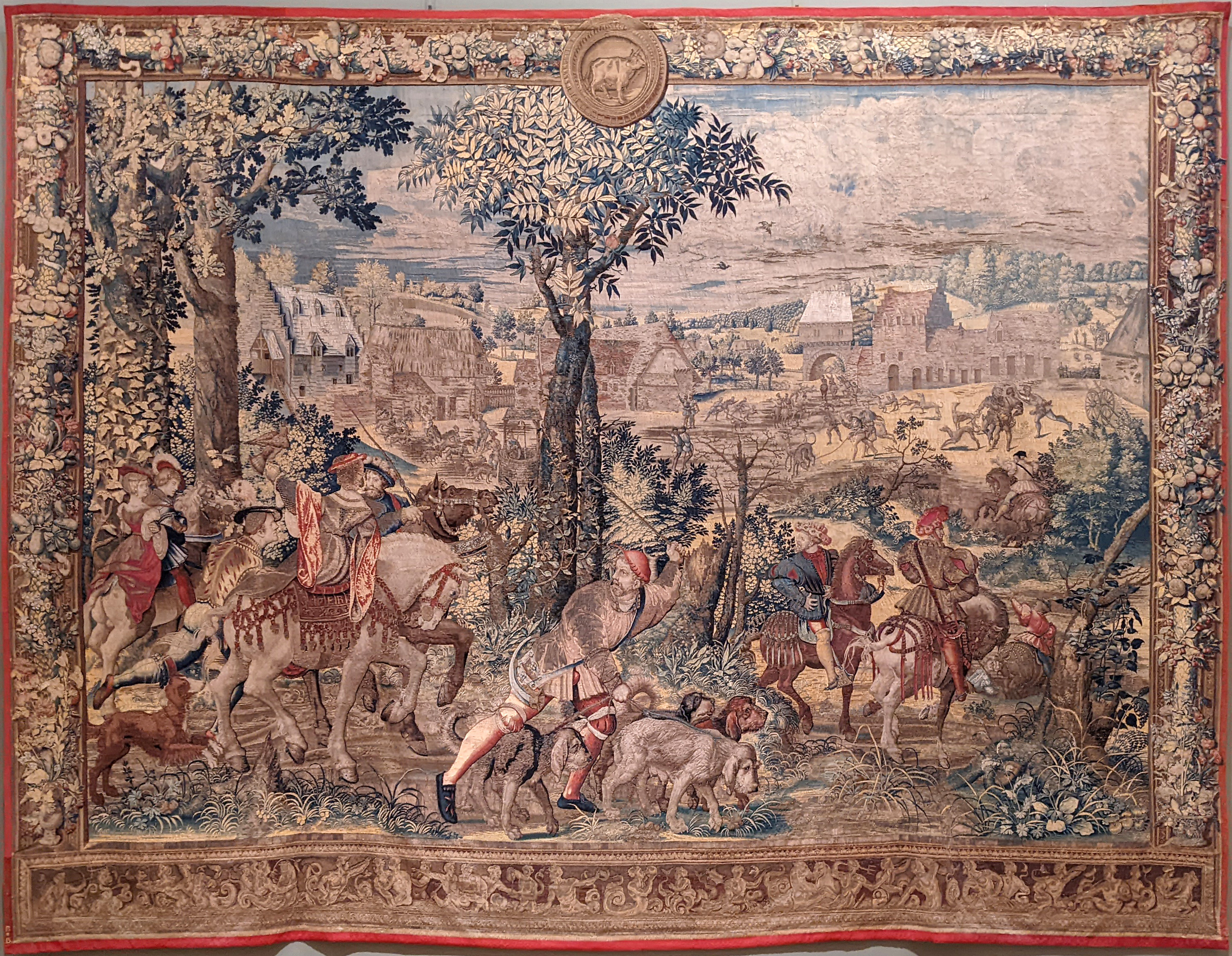
Hunts of Maximilian tapestry with Dry Borren at the background (1532)

- 1532: The castle appears on the tapestry dedicated to the month of April from the series called Hunts of Maximilian.
- 1659: Lucas Vorsterman the Younger Castrum trium fontium, vulgo Dry Borren, engraving, representation of the castle in 1659.
  - Engraved by Jacobus Harrewijn and inserted in Christophe Butkens, Supplément aux Trophées tant sacrés que profanes du Duché de Brabant (...), The Hague, Chrétien van Lom, 1726.
- 1659: Old engraving published by Antoon Sanders.
- 19th century: Paul Vitzthumb (son of Ignaz Vitzthumb), Vue du chastel dit Dry Borren.

== See also ==
- List of castles and châteaux in Belgium
- History of Brussels
- Culture of Belgium
- Belgium in the long nineteenth century
