= Dirk IV =

Dirk IV may refer to:

- Dirk IV, Count of Holland
- Dirk IV of Valkenburg
- Dirk IV van Wassenaer
- Dirk IV van Wisch
