= John of Enghien =

John of Enghien, Jean d'Enghien or Jan van Edingen may refer to:

- John of Enghien (bishop) (died 1281), bishop of Tournai and Liège
- John of Enghien (died 1373), count of Lecce
- Jean d'Enghien (chronicler) (died 1478), lord of Kestergat
- Jean de Bourbon, Count of Enghien (died 1557), French prince
