= Jean d'Enghien (chronicler) =

Enghien illustrated in an early copy of Jean's chronicle

Jean d'Enghien (c. 1400 – 12 August 1478) was Flemish knight and man of letters. He was the lord of Kestergat in the Duchy of Brabant and the author of a chronicle of Brabant in Old French.

== Family ==
Jean was born around 1400. A member of an illegitimate branch of the House of Enghien, he was a son of Engelbert d'Enghien, lord of Kestergat, and Isabeau de Hertoghe. According to René Goffin, he was the eldest son, but according to Alphonse Wauters he had an elder brother, Engelbert II. His godfather was Guillaume de Bornival, provost of Saint Gertrude's, Nivelles. His father was killed at the Battle of Agincourt in 1415.

Jean married Marie de Mol, daughter of Ywein and Maria van Pede. She died before him on 25 March 1464. They had five children:

- Elisabeth (died 1458), married Warnier de Davre
- Elisabeth junior, also called Isabeau (died 1485), married Jacques Taye (1451)
- Helene (died 1517), married Jan van Bernaige (1445)
- Louis (c. 1432–1503), married Marie d'Oisy (1465)
- Pierre (c. 1434–1527), married Margriete van den Heetvelde

== Life ==
The lordship which Jean inherited, with its seat at Kestergat in Pepingen, consisted of two parts: Leerbeek, which was held from the duke of Brabant, and Castre, which was held from the lord of Enghien. In addition, Jean held the lordships of Lembeke and Warmbroeck. He inherited the castle of Haren from his mother, on which he paid relief in 1451.

From 1420 or 1424, he was serving as a squire in the army of the Duke Philip the Good of Burgundy. In 1430, he was named a counsellor and chamberlain of Duke Philip I of Brabant. He first served as an ammanus of Brussels in that year, an office he held again in 1431–1432, 1437, 1444–1445, 1450, 1454–1455 and 1458. He became one of the ducal maîtres d'hôtel in 1444.

In 1448, Jean purchased the lordship of Ter Tommen and the viscounty of Grimbergen from Filips van Crayenhem and Jan van Lathem. He was knighted in 1452. On 30 January 1453, he purchased from Rasse Cornet the hereditary mayorship of Castre. While the Dauphin Louis, the future King Louis XI of France, was staying at the castle of Genappe between 1456 and 1461, Jean was a guest at one of his dinner parties and took part in the public reading of the bawdy Cent nouvelles nouvelles.

Jean was a defender of ducal rights in Brussels and often at odds with the municipal authorities. He was rewarded, after 1458, with the office of ammanus for life, the right to name his successor (he chose his eldest son) and an annual pension of 400 Rhenish florins. His conflict with the citizens came to a head on the last two days of September 1468, when large meetings were held in the townhall and in Jean's own house in the city, the Hôtel de Kestergat. Both sides agreed to drop their grievances before their conflict turned violent.

Jean donated a stained glass window to the Scheut Charterhouse, in the foundation of which he played a key role. He was forced into exile following the death of Duke Charles the Rash in 1477. He died on 12 August 1478. His ashes were interred next to his wife in the Carmelite monastery in Brussels.

== Works ==
Jean wrote a chronicle of Brabant in Old French, starting from the Flood and ending with the Battle of Woeringen in 1288, entitled Le Livre des Cronicques de Brabant. It is divided into four books, with the last being by far the longest. It may have originally included a fifth book extend beyond 1288.

In conception, Jean's chronicle is in the main a translation and condensation of the works several Middle Dutch historians into a single-volume French history. This project was supported by Philip the Good, but was not completed before he died in 1467. The finished work was dedicated to Charles the Rash.

Jean drew on the Dutch chronicles of Jan van Boendale and Emond de Dynter, as well as Jean Wauquelin's French translation of Dynter. Among his other sources are the Latin histories of Hugh of Fleury and the so-called Pseudo-Turpin. He also made use of the Dutch poem De Grimbergse Oorlog on the 12th-century War of Grimbergen. As a highly derivative work, Jean's Livre is not an important historical source in its own right, but it possesses some literary value. Its focus is on feats of arms.

Four manuscripts of Jean's Livre are known:

- London, British Library, Add. MS 18290 (15th century)
- Brussels, Royal Library of Belgium (KBR), MS 21266, fols 1r–159v (15th or 16th century)
- Brussels, Royal Library of Belgium (KBR), MS 21983–4, fols 2–271 (17th century or later)
- A illustrated manuscript now in private possession, auction by Sotheby's in 2018, formerly owned by Charles d'Aspremont Lynden, who gave it to the Royal Historical Commission in 1857
