= Emond de Dynter =

Belgian diplomat (1370–1449)

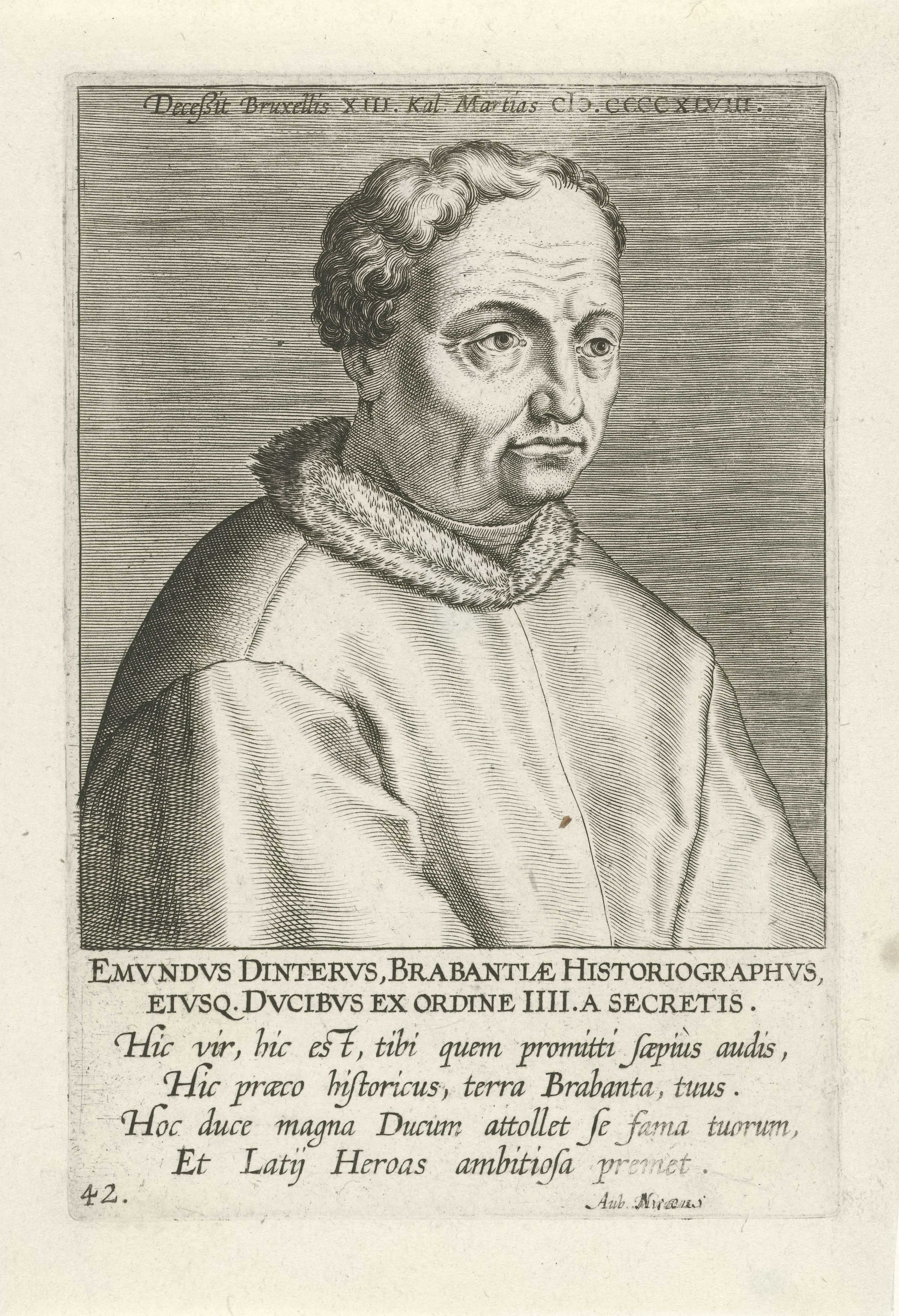
Emond Ambrosii de Dynter, 1604 engraving

Emond Ambrosii de Dynter (or: Emond van Dinther) (c. 1370 – 1449) was a descendant of the noble family Van Dinther, originating from the village of the same name Dinther in Brabant. From 1412 he was secretary to the Brussels chancery of four successive dukes of Brabant and of Burgundy, namely: Anton of Burgundy, John IV of Brabant, Philip of Saint-Pol and Philip the Good.

Between 1443 and 1446, Philip the Good commissioned him to write a chronicle on the history of the Duchy of Brabant until 1442: Chronica nobilissimorum ducum Lotharingiae et Brabantiae ac regnum Francorum. It runs until 1442 and was translated into French by Jehan Wauquelin, Philip the Good's secretary.

Among his students there was Wein van Cotthem, author of book six and seven of the Brabantsche Yeesten.

In the 19th century, Pierre de Ram produced an edition of De Dynter's writings in three sturdy bindings.

== Publications ==
- Chronica nobilissimorum ducum Lotharingiae et Brabantiae ac regnum Francorum: Books I, II and III; Books IV and V; Book VI
  - Old French translation of Jehan Wauquelin: Books I, II and III; Books IV and V; Book VI
- Librunculus sive Brevis chronica Brabantiae (covering the period 1288-1418)
- Notae chronologicae (ecclesiastical history of Brabant)
- Mutatio antiqui et novi regiminis (eyewitness account of the period 1421-1422)
- Oppida Brabantiae cum villis liberis atque pagis seriatim descripta
