= Dermoyen family =

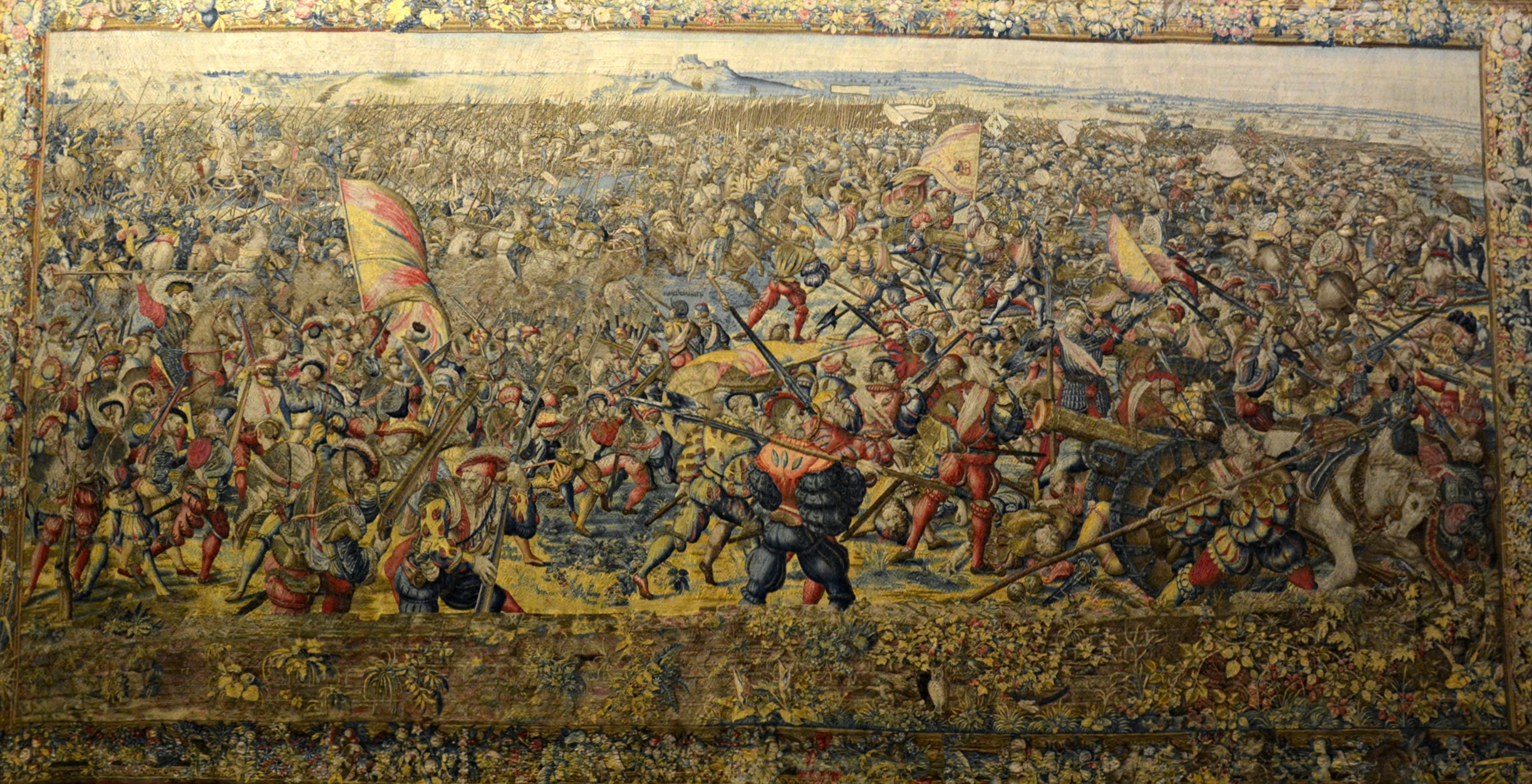
A tapestry depicting the defeat of the French cavalry at the Battle of Pavia of 24 February 1525; the imperial infantry seizes the enemy artillery

The Dermoyen family (Note: also referred to as van der Moyen, D'Armoyen, d'Armoyen, Moy, Moyen, or Moeyen) included a number of prominent weavers and dealers of Brussels tapestry in the 1500s.

== Members ==
Jan (Note: also referred to as Jan Moyen, Jan Moeyen, Jan van der Moyen, Jan D'Armoyen, Jan Dermoyen, and Jean Moeyen) and Willem (Note: also referred to as Willem Moy, Willem D'Armoyen, Gulliaume Dermoyen, Guillame Moeyen, Guillaume Moyen, Willem van der Moyen, Guillame Moeyen, and Guillaume Dermoyen) were weavers of large tapestries, in some cases for royal and imperial courts.

Jan and Willem are credited with leading the weaving of the Battle of Pavia tapestries in about 1528 to 1531. In this, they worked with Bernard van Orley.

Jan and Willem also led the weaving of the Hunts of Maximilian tapestries in about 1531 to 1533.

Jan is credited as having led the weaving of the Story of Cyrus tapestries that are now in the Isabella Stewart Gardner Museum.
