= Machteld van Voorne =

14th-century Dutch noblewoman

- Lady of Voorne
- Coat of arms of Voorne from the Beyeren Armorial
- Predecessor: Gerard van Voorne (?-1337)
- Born: c. 1300
- Died: 12 March 1372
- Mother: Heilwich van Borselen

Machteld van Voorne (c. 1300 - 12 March 1372) was Lady of Voorne, Monschau and Valkenburg, and burgrave of Zeeland between 1337 and 1372. During the Hook and Cod wars she was an important ally of Count William V of Holland.

== Family ==
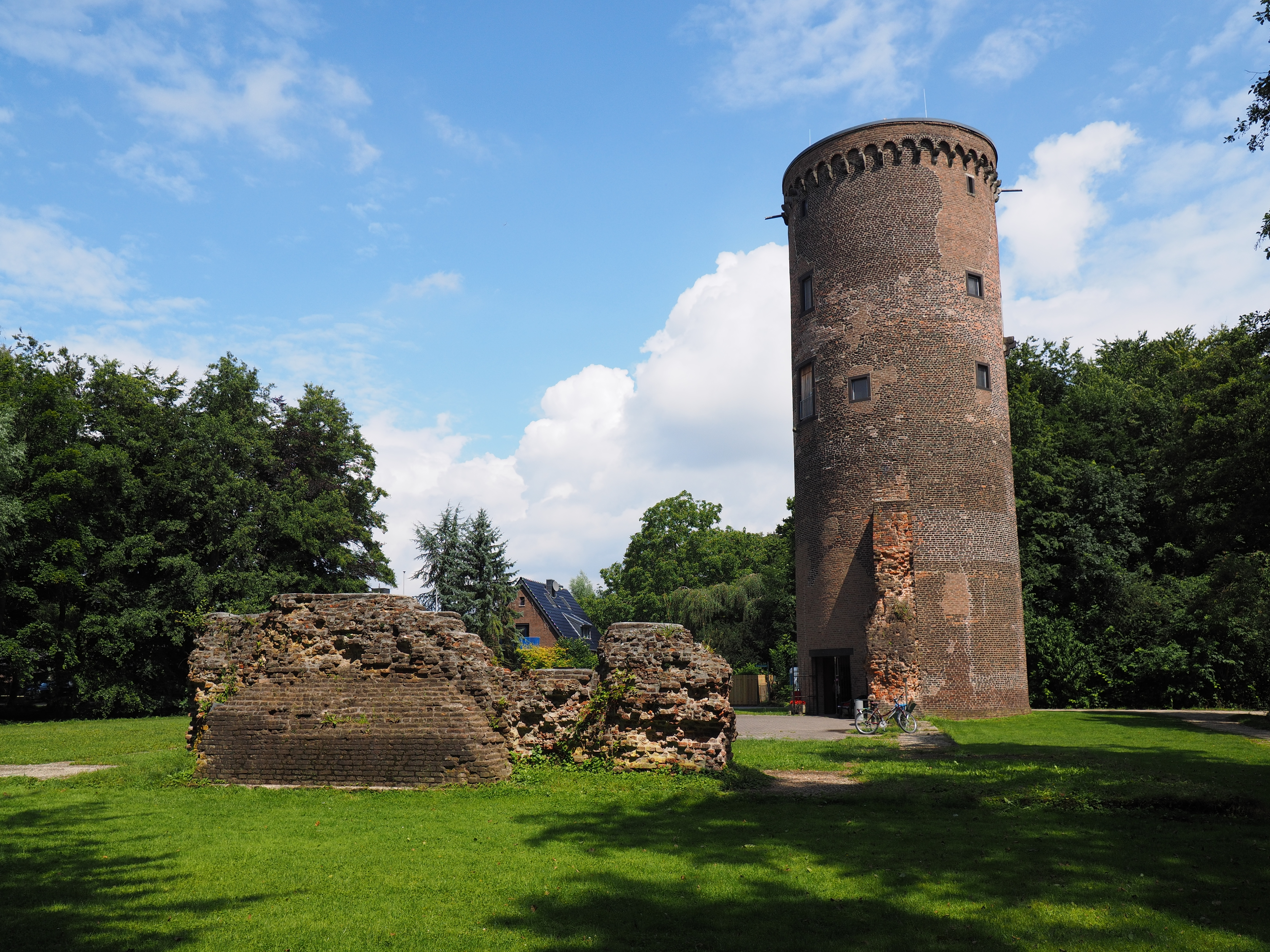
Uda Castle in Oedt

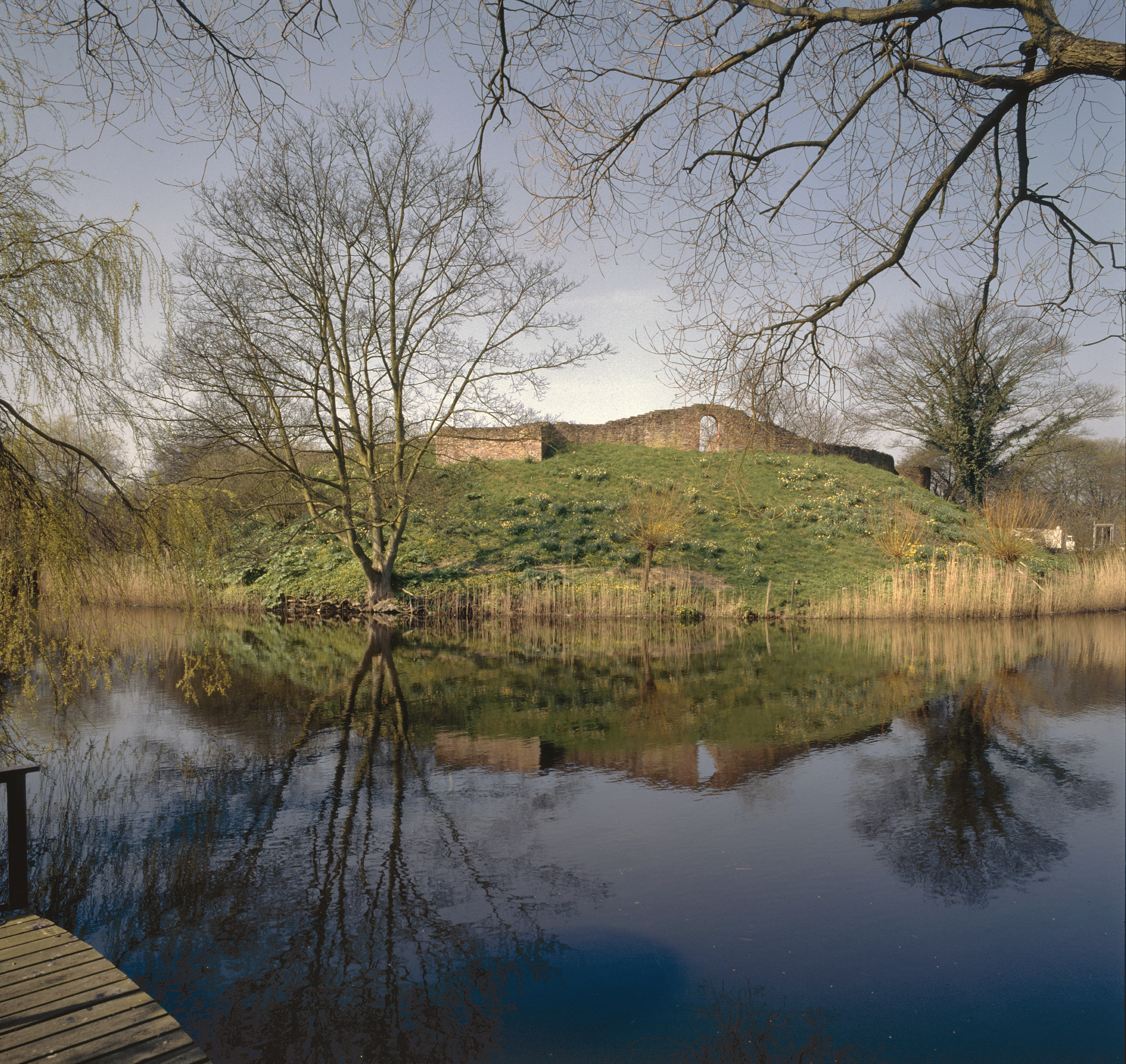
Ruins of the Burcht van Voorne

In 1297 Gerard van Voorne married Heilwich van Borselen. From this marriage were born: Willem (?-1319), Albert (?-1331), Katharina van Vornenburg (?-1366), and Machteld van Voorne. It is supposed that Machteld was born a few years after Gerard's marriage, i.e. about 1300.

For a long time it seemed that Machteld would have a very traditional role as a nobleman's wife. She first had a brother Willem, and then a brother Albert, who were supposed to succeed to the Lordship of Voorne.

In 1323 Machteld married the widower Dirk Loef III lord of Kervenheim en Oedt. He is often known as Count of Hülchrath, but had sold this domain in 1322, and soon styled himself only as Lord of Kervenheim and Oedt (near Grefrath). It is supposed that Dirk and Machteld took up residence at Uda Castle in Oedt. In general Dirk Loef III was very unsuccessful in his finances, he died in 1332.

== Career ==
=== Potential heiress of Voorne ===
On 25 September 1331 Albert of Voorne died during a tournament in London. It made Machteld the possible heiress of Voorne, because the Lords of Voorne held it from Holland: like the Counts held Holland from the empire. In the hope of producing a new heir, Machteld's father Gerard then quickly married Elizabeth van Kleef (?-1382) in 1332.

Machteld's brother's death made that on becoming a widow in 1332, Machteld was a desirable widow that might one day inherit Voorne. In 1336 she remarried to Dirk IV van Valkenburg. He had been destined for the clergy, but after his older brother died, he became a layman again in order to succeed his father. He was lord of Valkenburg, with its famous castle, and Monschau. Dirk fought a lot of wars.

=== Lady of Voorne ===
On 20 April 1337 Machteld's father Gerard died. On 30 September 1337 Count William IV of Holland then granted all of Gerard's fiefs to Machteld. In return Machteld and Dirk promised to help the count with 150 knights and squires at their own cost in times of war. There was an exception for wars against their liege lords the Duke of Brabant, or the Count of Guelders. They also promised not to allow any marriage of Joan, daughter of Albert without consent of the count.

=== Rule ===
The Lady of Voorne ruled the island Voorne with the town Brielle from the Burcht of Voorne in Oostvoorne. She also had possessions on the island Goeree also known as Westvoorne. Other lordships were on the islands Overflakkee and Schouwen-Duiveland. The lords of Voorne even held lands north of the Meuse, in Utrecht, the Betuwe, Flanders etc.

The office of burgrave traditionally gathered a lot of income for the lords of Voorne. However, in 1328 the count of Holland had been as wise to buy off these rights. The burgraves kept the title and the prestige that the office brought.

Machteld is remembered for the city rights she gave to Brielle in 1343. She was also involved in creating new polders. She successfully defended the economic interests of Brielle against those of Dordrecht, who wanted to establish a monopoly in the trade of certain goods. In 1349 she founded a chapter dedicated to Pancras of Rome at the grounds of the Burcht van Voorne.

=== The Hook and Cod Wars ===
After Willem IV of Holland died at Staveren in September 1345, he was succeeded by his sister Margaret of Hainaut. On 18 April 1346 one of her first acts was to rule that her son Otto V, Duke of Bavaria would succeed to the lordship of Voorne on Machteld's death. This was not to the liking of Machteld, because the previous settlement left open the possibility that her niece Joan would succeed her. When the Hook and Cod wars erupted, Machteld would do anything to help William.

The opportunity for vengeance arrived when Margaret's fleet approached the Meuse in July 1351. Machteld sent troops that helped to defeat Margaret in the Battle of Zwartewaal. The battle was fought offshore of Machteld's village Zwartewaal.

=== Final years ===
Whatever the defeat of Margaret of Hainaut, it did not make that the decision to give Voorne to Otto of Bavaria was overturned. In June 1358 a treaty between Louis the Roman and count Albert of Holland, confirmed the gift to Otto. However, when Machteld died in 1371 or early 1372, Albert kept her inheritance for himself as liege lord. He did give several pretenders a piece of her inheritance.

== Offspring ==
Machteld did not have any children.
