= Jean Le Bel =

French chronicler (d. 1370)

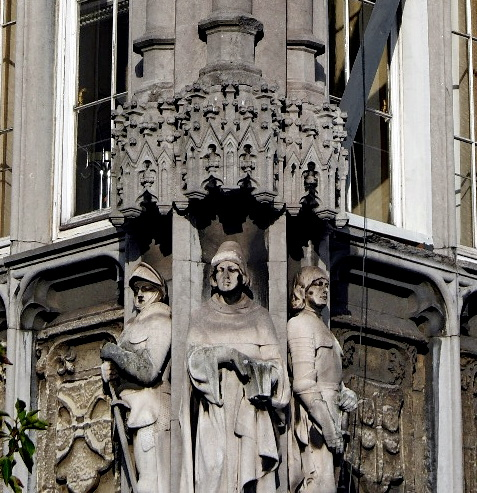
Statue of Jean le Bel (right) at the façade of the provincial palace in Liège

Jean Le Bel (c. 1290– 15 February 1370) was a chronicler from Liège.

== Biography ==
Jean Le Bel's father, Gilles le Beal des Changes, was an alderman of Liège. Jean entered the church and became a canon of the cathedral church, but he and his brother Henri followed Jean de Beaumont to England in 1327, and took part in the border warfare against the Scots. His will is dated 1369, and his epitaph gives the date of his death as 1370. Nothing more is known of his life, but Jacques de Hemricourt, author of the Miroir des nobles de Hesbaye, has left a eulogy of his character, and a description of the magnificence of his attire, his retinue and his hospitality. Hemricourt asserts that he was eighty years old or more when he died.

== Chronicles ==
Jean was one of the first chroniclers to write in French instead of Latin. He was a soldier and companion of Jean, Count de Beaumont and travelled with him to England and Scotland in 1327. At the request of the duke, he wrote Vrayes Chroniques ("True Chronicles"), which recorded the events of the reign of Edward III. He is believed to be the first person to use interviews to confirm and supplement his facts. Jean gives as his reason for writing a desire to replace a certain misleading rhymed chronicle of the wars of Edward III by a true relation of his enterprises down to the beginning of the Hundred Years' War.

For a long time Jean was only known as a chronicler through a reference by Jean Froissart; Froissart was greatly influenced by him and borrowed from his texts. Froissart names him in the prologue of the first book of his Chronicles as one of his authorities, and incorporates Le Bel's own text, verbatim and at length, in his own book. Le Bel's own chronicle is only preserved in a single, anonymous manuscript. A fragment of his work in the manuscript of Jean d'Outremeuse's Ly Myreur des Histors, was discovered in 1847; and the whole of his chronicle, preserved in the library of Chálons-sur-Marne, was first edited in 1863 by L. Polain, and again in 1904-05 for the Société de l’histoire de France.

In the matter of style Le Bel has been placed by some critics on the level of Froissart. His chief merit is his refusal to narrate events unless either he himself or his informant had witnessed them. This scrupulousness in the acceptance of evidence must be set against his limitations. He takes on the whole a similar point of view to Froissart's; he has no concern with national movements or politics; and, writing for the public of chivalry, he preserves no general notion of a campaign, which resolves itself in his narrative into a series of exploits on the part of his heroes. Froissart was considerably indebted to him, and seems to have borrowed from him some of his best-known episodes, such as the death of Robert the Bruce, Edward III and the countess of Salisbury, and the devotion of the burghers of Calais. The songs and virelais, in the art of writing which he was, according to Hemricourt, an expert, have not come to light.
