= Hunts of Maximilian =

Set of 16th-century tapestries of hunting scenes in the Sonian Forest, near Brussels

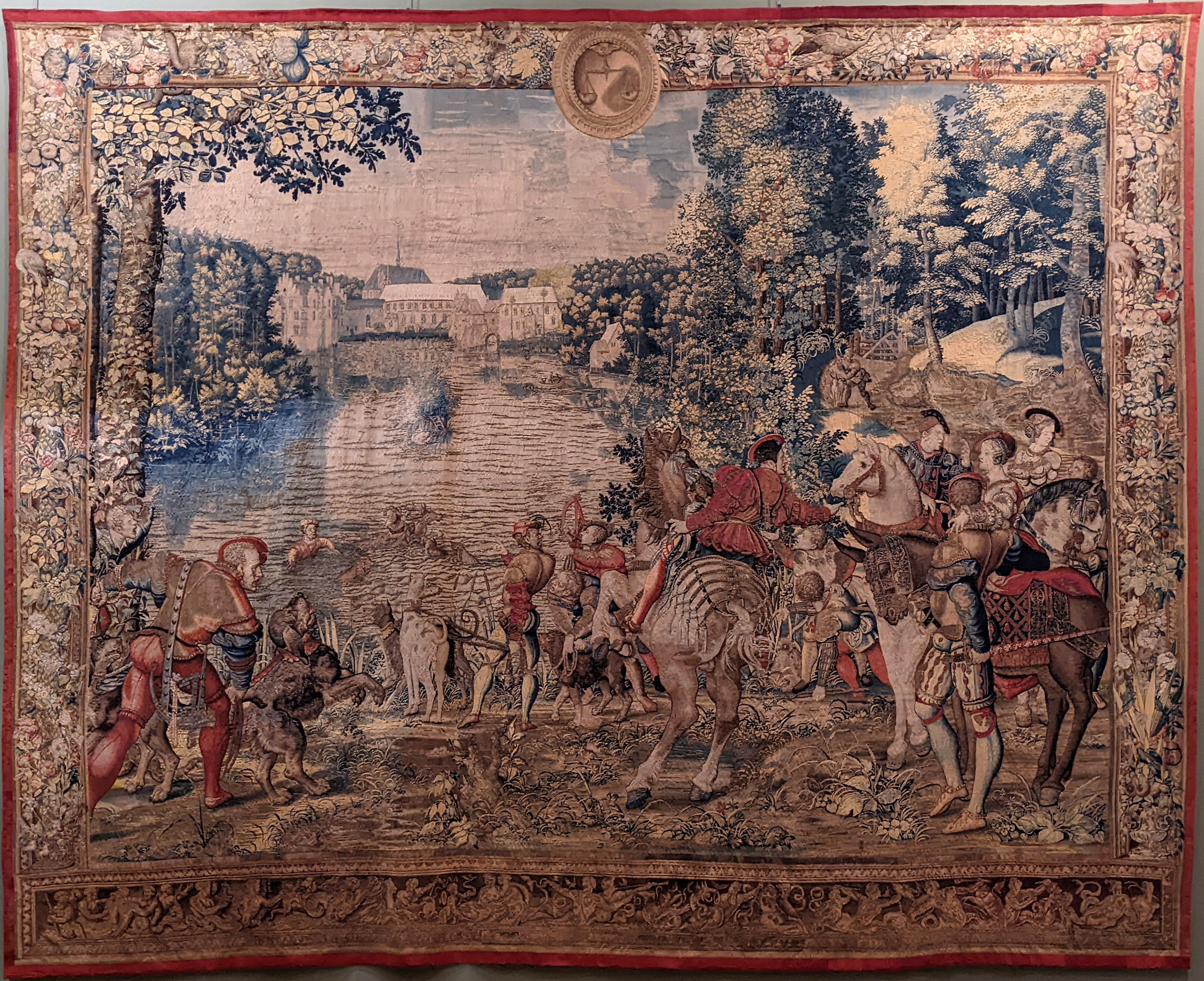
September – Scene from a deer hunt

The Hunts of Maximilian or Les Chasses de Maximilien, also Les Belles chasses de Guise (The Beautiful Hunts of Guise) are a set of twelve tapestries, one per month, depicting hunting scenes in the Sonian Forest, south of Brussels, by the court of Maximilian I, Holy Roman Emperor (d. 1519). They were produced in a Brussels workshop, and several tapestries are given identifiable locations that were then around the outskirts of the city, but are now mostly engulfed by it. The set is now in the Louvre.

The original set, completed in the 1530s, were commissioned by a member of the Habsburg family: either Charles V (Maximilian's grandson), or his aunt Margaret of Austria (Maximilian's daughter), or Charles's sister Mary of Hungary. Both princesses governed the Low Countries in Charles' name, Mary taking over after Margaret's death in 1530. A contract of 1533 probably refers to these tapestries.

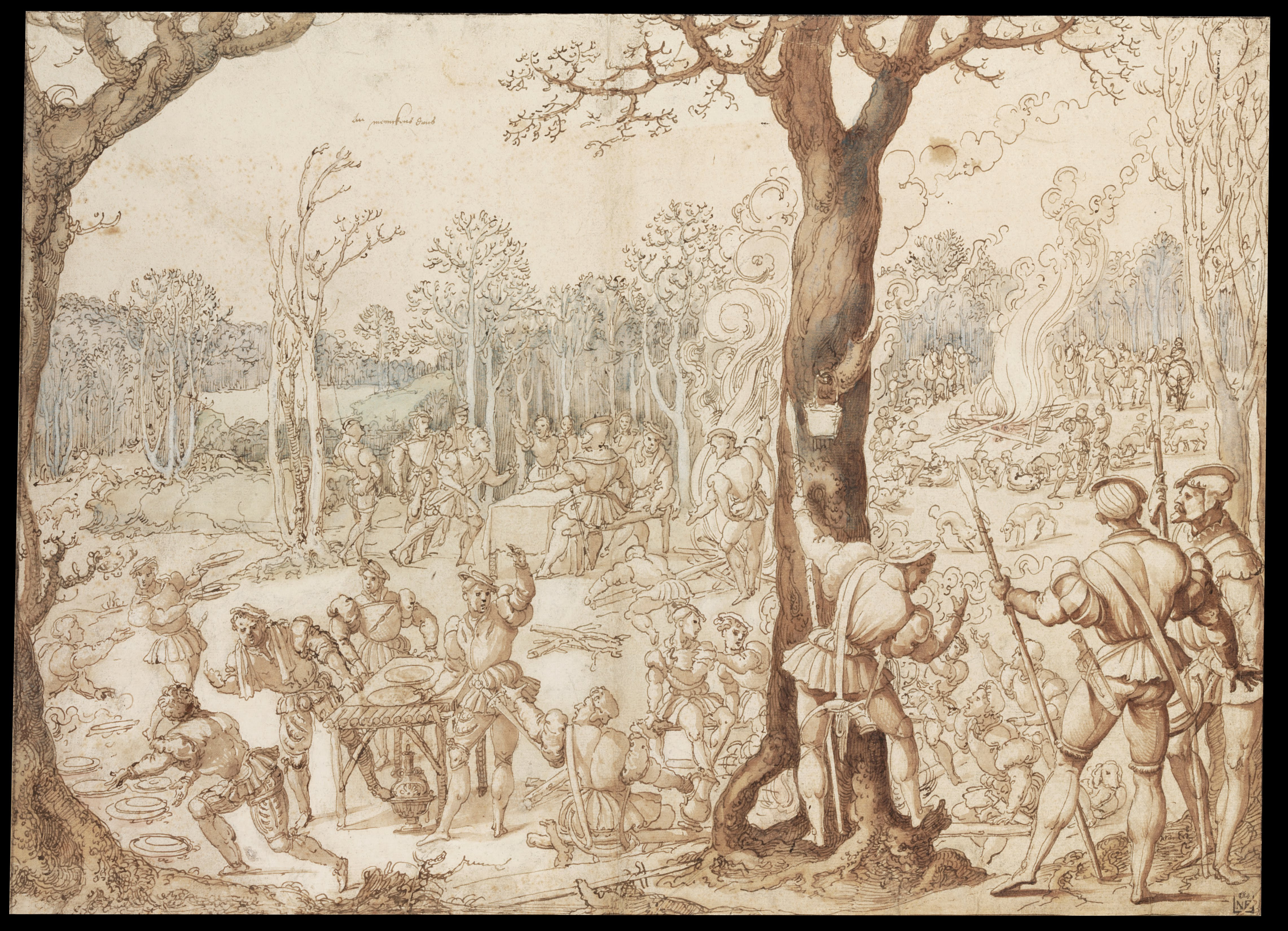
Bernard van Orley drawing, for November, Budapest

They were almost certainly designed by Bernard van Orley, the leading tapestry designer of the day, perhaps between 1528 and 1533. Jan Cornelisz Vermeyen has been suggested as a possibility in the past. Both of these designed other tapestries for the Habsburgs. Jan and Willem Dermoyen are credited as leading the weaving.

Each tapestry has a roundel at centre top containing the astrological symbol for the month. They probably contain portraits of individuals from Maximilian's court; attempts have been made to identify these. Some pen and ink drawings by van Orley are in the Louvre, and the National Gallery of Art in Washington has a drawing for "August". The borders may have been designed by a different artist; they do not feature in any surviving van Orley drawings.

Sets of hunting scenes had long been a popular subject in tapestry, with sets like the Devonshire Hunting Tapestries (1430–1450, V&A), perhaps the largest set of 15th-century survivals, showing the hunting of bears, boars, deer, swans, otters, and falconry. There are large numbers of human figures and animals arranged fairly evenly across the whole image space, and only a rudimentary landscape setting. Very fashionably dressed ladies and gentlemen stroll around beside the slaughter. But the Hunts of Maximilian are very different, with an advanced Renaissance compositional style adapted to tapestries, and a remarkably forward-looking group of expansive landscapes behind the figures.

The Louvre's set were in the collection of the Dukes of Guise by 1589, remaining until 1654. After being owned by Cardinal Mazarin, they entered the French royal collection of Louis XIV in 1665. They are now in the Louvre museum, and considered one of the masterpieces of the art of tapestry.

== Copies ==
Well over a century after the originals, copies of the original set were made at the Gobelins factory in Paris, initially for Louis XIV of France, who commissioned two sets at different times. There are Gobelins copies in the Musée national du Château de Pau (1680s), the Musée Condé in Chantilly (19th century), and the Metropolitan Museum of Art (1690s). Though the Metropolitan pieces are the same as the originals, the Pau and Chantilly sets have different borders, and the astrological symbols are replaced by coats of arms.

Various copies were made in Brussels in the late 17th century, signed by Evraert Leyniers. Six are in Château of Franc-Waret in Belgium (1665–1676), and three in the Musée de Brou in Bourg-en-Bresse. A set of six was until 1950 in the Château de Keriolet in Finistère.

Description of each tapestry
Month	Topic	Height	Length	Zodiac sign	Image
January	Boar hunt at Tervuren Castle	4,41 m	5,85 m	Aquarius	
February	Homage of the hunters to king Modus and queen Ratio in the grounds of the Coudenberg Palace in Brussels	4,30 m	6,46 m	Pisces	
March	Bird hunt; start with a panorama over the city of Brussels from the duke's Coudenberg Palace, as it existed between 1531 and 1533, as far as the towers of St. Gudula's Church.	4,40 m	7,50 m	Aries	
April	Bird hunt, return to Boitsfort, with Trois Fontaines Castle in the background	4,50 m	5,82 m	Taurus	
May	Deer hunt, assembling over the hills of Boitsfort	4,51 m	5,85 m	Gemini	
June	Deer hunt, hunting meal	4,57 m	5,55 m	Cancer	
July	Deer hunt, with Rouge Cloître Abbey in the background	4,33 m	5,75 m	Leo	
August	Deer hunt at the "Patte d'Oie" lakes	4,57 m	6,82 m	Virgo	
September	Deer hunt: chasing the deer in the lakes of Groenendael Priory	4,68 m	5,48 m	Libra	
October	Deer hunt in Boendael	4,48 m	5,75 m	Scorpio	
November	Boar hunt: hunting meal	4,32 m	5,83 m	Sagittarius	
December	Boar hunt, animal caught near Trois Fontaines Castle	4,48 m	6,08 m	Capricorn	

== See also ==
- Cultural depictions of Maximilian I, Holy Roman Emperor
