= Burcht of Voorne =

Ruinous castle in Oostvoorne, Netherlands

- Burcht van Voorne
- Oostvoorne, the Netherlands
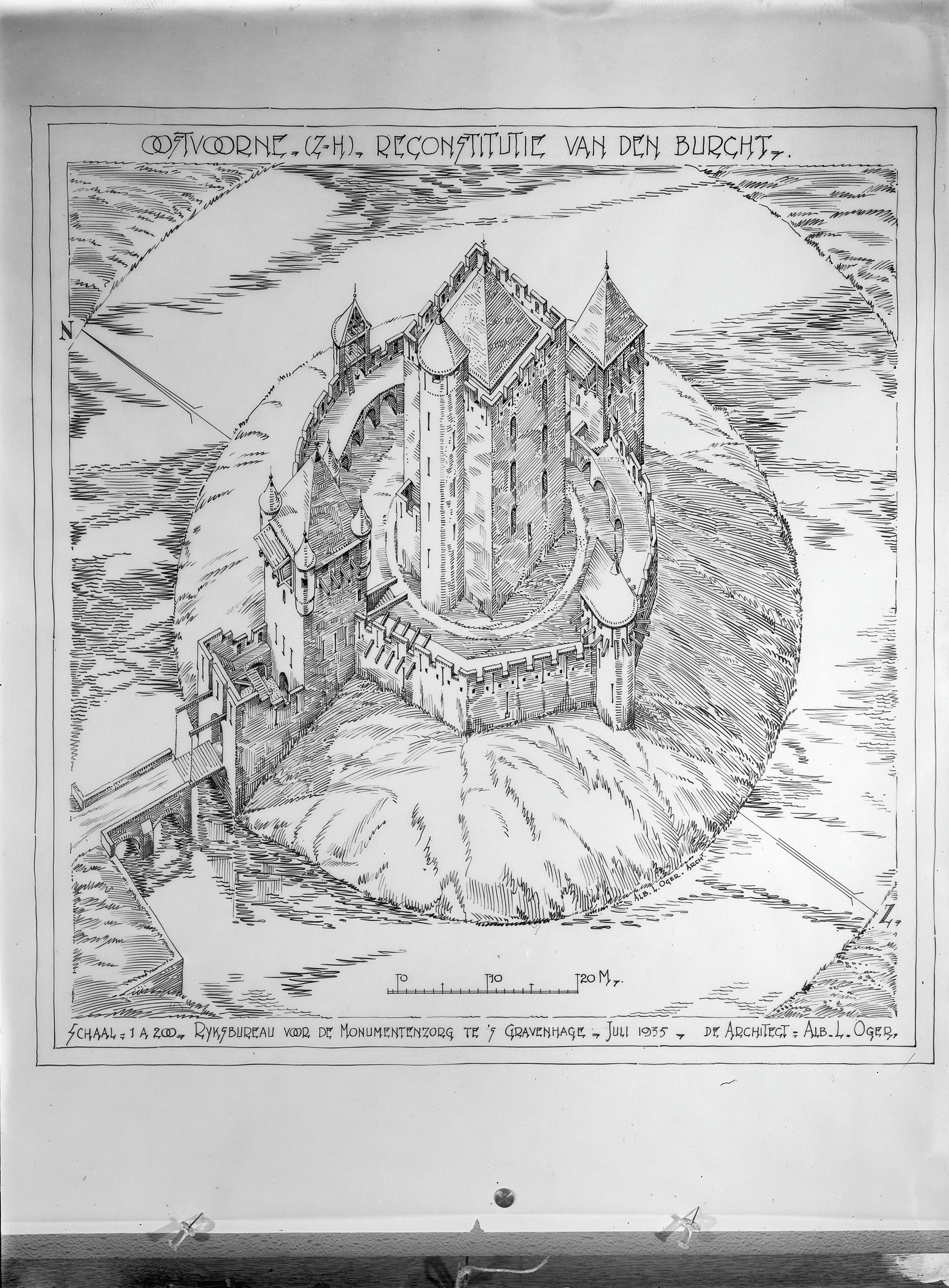
- Reconstruction of Voorne Castle

Site information
- Type: Motte Castle
- Open to the public: Yes
- Condition: Restored ruins

Location
- South Holland
- Location within South Holland
- Coordinates: 51.916446°N 4.103960°E

Site history
- Built: c. 1200

The Burcht of Voorne is a ruinous motte-and-bailey castle in Oostvoorne, Netherlands. It was home to the Lords of Voorne, burgraves of Zeeland.

== Burgs ==
=== The name Burcht of Voorne ===
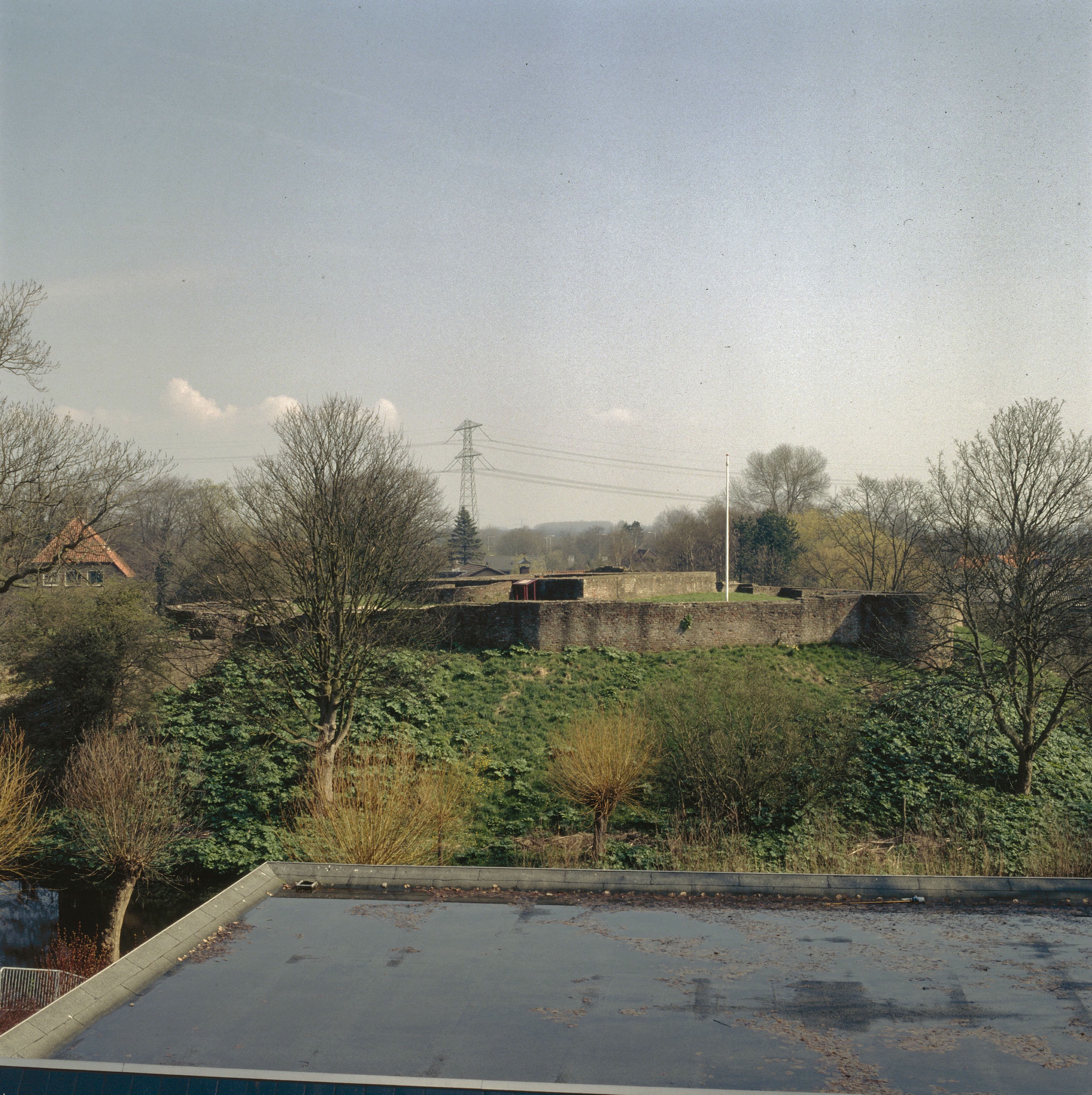
Burcht of Voorne.

The Dutch name of this castle: Burcht van Voorne sets it apart from other Dutch castles. The only other Dutch castle which has 'Burcht van' prefixed, is the Burcht van Leiden. In medieval Dutch the words Burg, Burcht (Burh or Burgh) referred to a fortification which would serve as a refuge in times of danger. The word Huis (house), later Kasteel (castle) referred to the defendable home of a nobleman.

Before the construction of stone fortifications began, the medieval Netherlands had a number of burgs comparable to Viking ring fortressess. These were constructed in the ninth century, and had a diameter between 85 and 210 m. Examples are: Bergues, Middelburg, Souburg (southern Burg), Burgh, and Den Burg.

=== The other Burcht ===
The Burcht van Leiden was founded shortly before 1061. It was then known as Leitheriburg. The place below the Burcht had been raised as a terp in the 10th century. Shortly before 1100 this castle consisted of a 9 m high motte with a wooden defensive building on top. In the late twelfth century, the Burcht of Leiden got a tuff wall, and became a shell keep. Meanwhile, the most important noblemen of Holland and Zeeland also began to build mottes, notably Egmond Castle and Borssele. These got brick walls shortly after 1200. The Burcht of Voorne belongs to this group of relatively old castles.

== The castle ==
=== The castle buildings in Oostvoorne ===
The Burcht of Voorne is a ruin. The highest surviving remains measure 4 m from the foundations. The castle consisted of a tower house with very thick walls. At the end of the 13th century, a ringwall was constructed around the main tower, about halfway from the top of the motte. The ringwall had four towers and a protruding gatehouse.

On the level terrain before the motte was the outer bailey. It had housing, manorial buildings, the great hall, the chapel, stables etc. The outer bailey has not been subjected to an archaeological excavation, but this configuration is known from maintenance accounts dating from the 14th to 16th centuries.

A picture of the buildings at Oostvoorne made by Cornelis van Alkemade in about 1700, shows the outer bailey, not only in front, but entirely encircling the motte. If this picture is correct, one can speculate that the Burcht of Voorne was built inside an earlier Viking ring fortress type of earthen fortification. However, as long as no archaeological investigation is done, this is speculation.

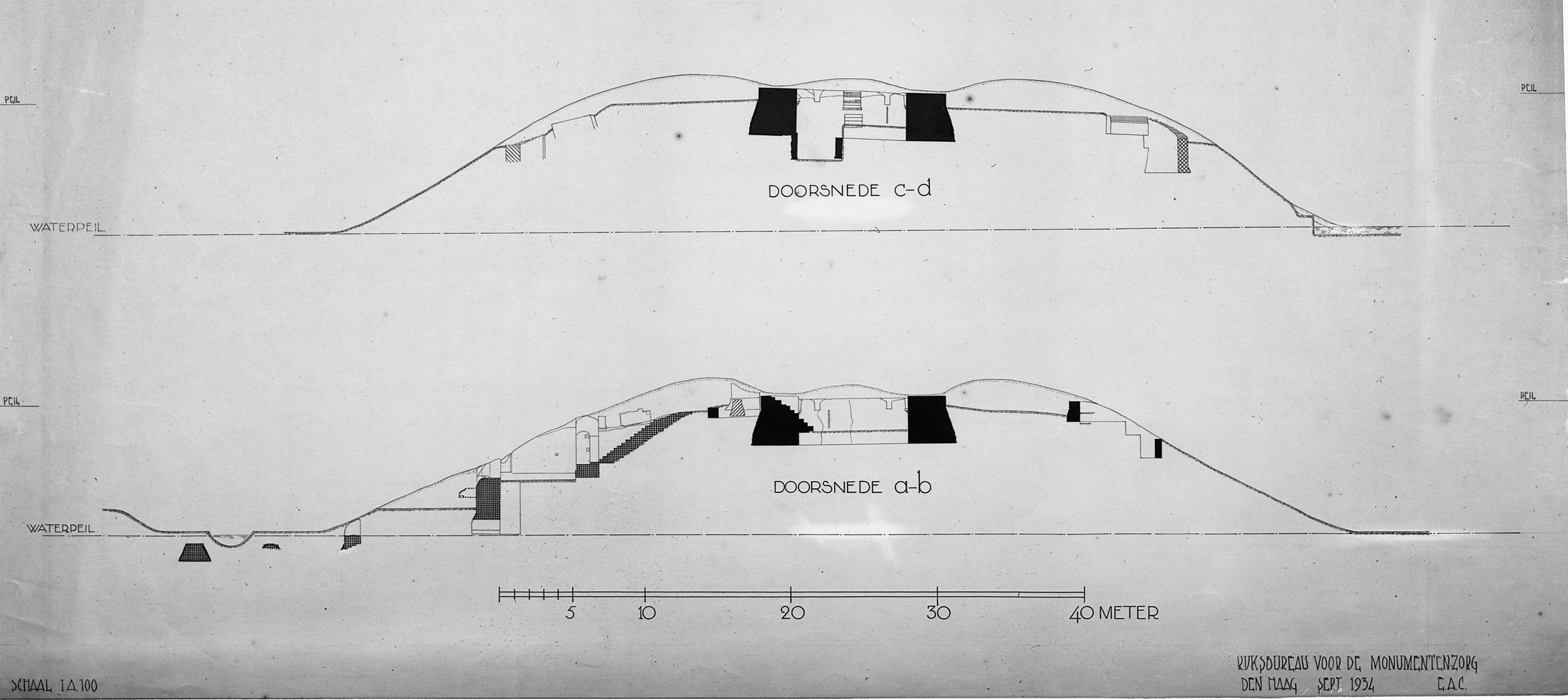
The motte of Oostvoorne

The diameter of the motte is about 69 m. The base of the motte seems to have been a dune or sand hill of about 7 m high. On top of this was a layer of sand mixed with loam (klei). This layer was 0.50 m thick in the center, and 1 m or more thick near the ring wall. The motte has to be dated to the 13th century, because not a single shred of 12th century pottery was found in situ.

The tower house measures 12.60 * 12.60 m, with 2.60 m thick walls. All that is left is the lower half of the basement, which was partly below ground. The basement was vaulted. This basement was accessible from the main floor via a stair in the western wall. The tower was founded on the original (dune) ground level of the motte. The motte was then constructed around the tower. The tower house should be dated to shortly after 1200.

The diameter of the polygonal ringwall is 42 m at its widest, and 37 m at its smallest. The gatehouse measures about 8.4 m square. The other towers are much smaller. The ringwall is only 0.60-0.90 m thick, and has buttresses on the inside at very (1.40–4 m) irregular intervals. The protected walkway had an average width of 3 m.

== History ==
=== The Lords of Voorne ===
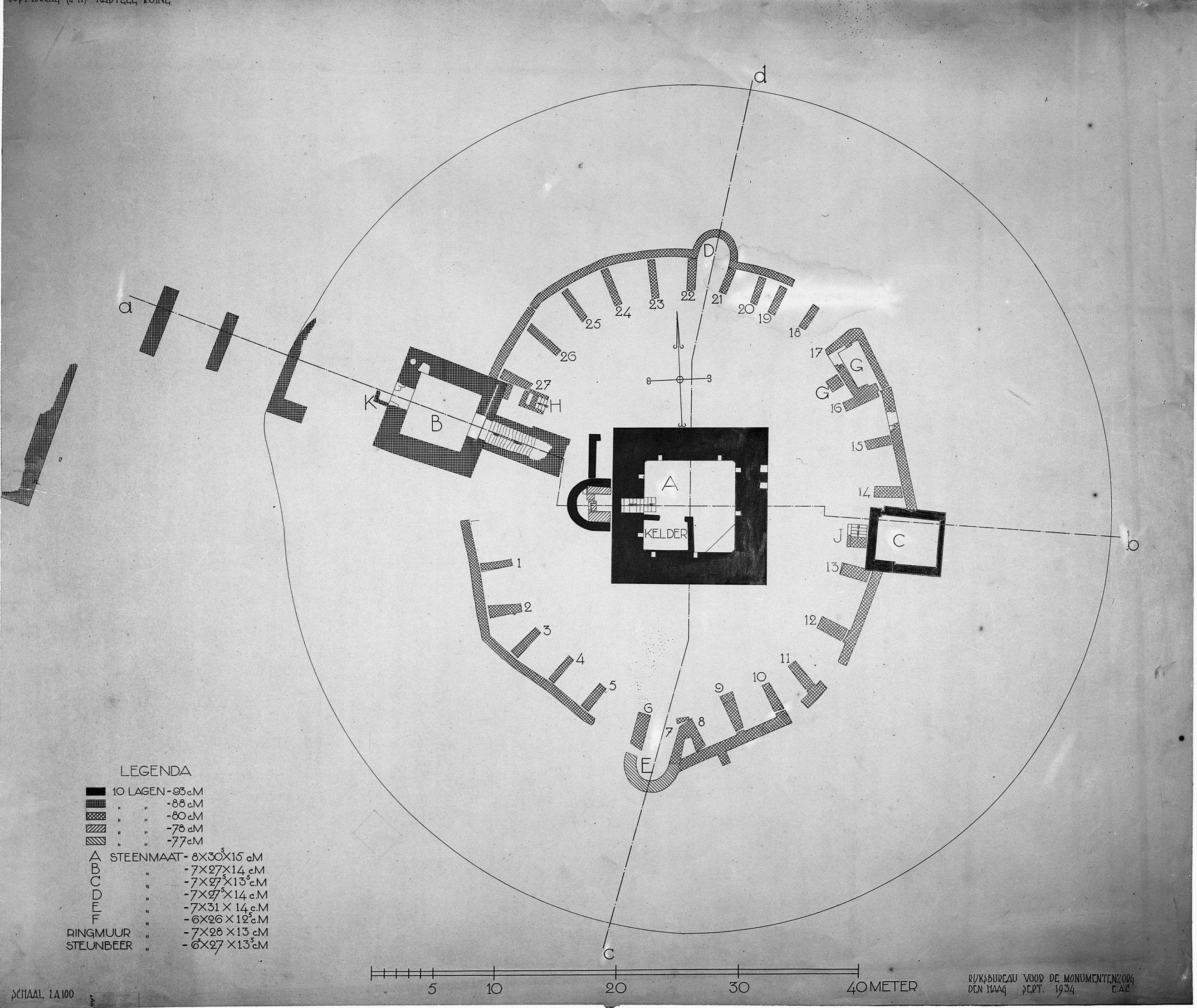
Floor plan 1935

The Burcht of Oostvoorne was owned by the Lords of Voorne. These were very prominent in the County of Holland and were probably related to the counts. Three appanages were split of from Voorne: Heenvliet, Zwartewaal and Putten. Together with the Lords of Putten, the Lords of Voorne were the only lords that had the right to summon their inhabitants for war. On the island Westvoorn a.k.a. Goeree, now part of Goeree-Overflakkee the Lords of Voorne had a motte castle at Ouddorp.

Hugo van Voorne, mentioned in 1108 is the earliest known Lord of Voorne. The first lord about whom we have some certainty, is Floris van Voorne mentioned from 1156 to 1174. During the Loon War (1203-1206) Hugo van Voorne supported Ada, Countess of Holland. This can be explained by that if a female could inherit Holland, a female could also inherit Voorne, because Voorne was held from the count on the same conditions as the county of Holland was held from the empire. During this war, Hugo's castle in Poortvliet on the island Tholen was destroyed. The construction of the Burcht of Voorne was started soon after.

The last lord of Voorne was Machteld van Voorne. Machteld got Voorne from Count William IV of Holland as a favor in 1337. When Machteld died in 1371 or 1372, the Count of Holland kept the Lordship of Voorne to himself. He did give some pieces to potential pretenders.

=== Jacqueline of Hainaut ===
Voorne is said to have been a regular residence of Jacqueline, Countess of Hainaut (1401-1436). In 1434 she married Frank van Borssele (1396-1470), who was also Lord of Voorne.

=== Decay ===
Problems with foundations made that the burcht was already ruinous in the 17th century. Pictures show that by then, many parts had already begun to incline towards the moat. In 1728 Cornelis van Alkemade viewed the Burcht of Voorne, and gave a description. Adriaan Kluit visited the site for his unpublished work 'De Landen van Oost-, West- en Zuid-Voorn'.

=== Excavation ===
In March 1934 excavations were started at the castle site. This was done as part of an employment program.

== Current status ==
The ruins of the Burcht of Voorne remained the property of the state till 15 January 2016. The ruins were then transferred to the Nationale Monumentenorganisatie (NMo).
