= Teutonic, West Virginia =

Teutonic
- Unincorporated community
- Location within the state of West Virginia Teutonic (the United States)
- Coordinates: 39°45′22″N 80°42′59″W
- Country: United States
- State: West Virginia
- County: Marshall
- Elevation: 1,368 ft (417 m)
- Time zone: UTC-5 (Eastern (EST))
  - Summer (DST): UTC-4 (EDT)
- GNIS ID: 1717456

Teutonic was an unincorporated community in Marshall County, West Virginia.
