= Dirk IV of Valkenburg =

Dirk IV (also Thierry IV or Dietrich IV) was the lord of Valkenburg from 1333 until 1346.

Like his father, Dirk joined an alliance against the expansionist Duke John III of Brabant. He took part in the Liège–Brabant war of 1332–1334. There were skirmishes in April 1332 at Fexhe-Slins. Following the capture of Maastricht in March 1334, armistice negotiations began. King Philip VI of France was asked to mediate and ultimately ordered the duke to return Valkenburg, Sittard, Heerlen and the castle of Boutersem to Dirk and recognize his rights.

In the same year that he recovered his lordship (1334), Dirk sold Susteren and Dieteren to his uncle, John of Valkenburg, lord of Born. He was recognized as a citizen of the free imperial city of Cologne and served as a counsellor of Count Reginald II of Guelders. In 1336, he married Machteld van Voorne, heiress of Gerard, lord of Voorne and viscount (burgrave) of Zeeland. After the death of his father-in-law, he was granted Zeeland by Count William IV of Holland with the obligation to provide 150 men-at-arms to serve the count.

At the outbreak of the Hundred Years' War in 1337, Dirk sent 200 men-at-arms to assist King Edward III of England. In February 1338, he defended the count of Holland against the accusation that he was involved in a plot against the king of France. Later in 1338, he fought alongside the duke of Brabant against Liège and was named guardian of the provostry of Meerssen.

In 1339, Dirk received a promissory note from Edward III for the amount of 30,000 florins. In 1340, he took part in the defence of Le Quesnoy against the French and in the coalition siege of Tournai. In 1341, after complaining to Edward III, he received a quarter of what he was owed. In 1343, he prepared to join the ongoing crusade against Granada in Spain. The death of Reginald II disrupted these plans. John of Valkenburg was named intendant and Dirk became stadtholder of Guelders during the minority of Reginald's heirs. Dirk's relationship with his uncle deteriorated and he resigned from his post early.

In 1345, Dirk went on a pilgrimage to the Holy Land. Upon his return, he supported Bishop Engelbert I of Liège against the rebellious citizens of Liège and Huy. On 19 July 1346, he was one of the 57 knights who died in the battle of Vottem after initially refusing to join the retreat.
