= Henry of Rebdorf =

Henry of Rebdorf is the name given to the alleged author of an imperial and papal chronicle of the thirteenth and fourteenth centuries. The only connexion between the chronicle to which the name of Henry of Rebdorf has been attached and the foundation of the Augustinian canons at Rebdorf, near Eichstätt, Bavaria, lay in the fact that the first editor of the said chronicle published it from a manuscript preserved there, and later taken to the Bibliothèque Nationale in Paris, while other manuscripts, displaying no essential points of difference, are known to exist in Klosterneuburg Monastery and in the Hofbibliothek in Vienna.

Its title is: Chronica, or Annales rerum ab imperatoribus Adolpho, Alberto, Friderico, Ludovico Bavarico et Carolo IV. gestarum, or again Annales imperatorum et paparum. It is a chronological treatise extending from 1294 to 1362, and consists of two parts. The first part is a sequel to what is called the Flores Temporum, a well-known chronicle of the world's history compiled by a Swabian Franciscan, and reaches to the year 1343; it was probably compiled by an unknown writer about 1346 or 1347. The second part is a history of the twenty years from 1343 to 1363. Its author was the magister Heinrich Taub, or Heinrich der Taube (Heinrich the Deaf), or Henricus Surdus of Selbach, who officiated as chaplain at St. Willibald's in Eichstätt and died about 1364. Practically nothing has been learned of his life. We only know that he journeyed to Rome in 1350, for the purpose of gaining the jubilee indulgence, and that in 1361 in Nuremberg he admired the crown jewels then exhibited in honour of the christening of the newborn imperial prince, Wenceslaus. Various conjectures have been made as to the personality of the author, but nothing certain has been established. The chronicle itself, particularly in its second part, has some importance, and was first edited by Marquard Freher in Rerum Germanicarum Scriptores, I, 411-52 (Frankfurt-am-Main, 1600); 2nd ed., 1634; again by Gewold (Ingolstadt, 1618); later by Struve (Strasbourg, 1717), and finally by Böhmer-Huber in Fontes rerum Germanicarum, IV (1868), 507–68. It was translated into German under the title: Annales Imperatorum et Paparum Eistettenses, by Dieringer (Eichstätt, 1883); also by Grandaur in the Geschichtschreiber der deutschen Vorzeit (Leipzig, 1883).
