= Jacques de Hemricourt =

Jacques de Hemricourt (1333–1403) was a 14th-century mayor of Liège and chronicler of the nobility of Hesbaye.

== Life ==
Hemricourt, the son of Gilles de Hemricourt and Ida d'Abbé, in 1360 succeeded his father as clerk to the aldermen of Liège. He continued in office until 1383. In 1381 Arnold of Horne, Prince-Bishop of Liège, appointed him to his privy council, and in 1389 he was elected mayor of Liège. In 1397, after being widowed for the second time, he became a knight of St John of Jerusalem.

He died in Liège on 18 December 1403.

== Writings ==
Hemricourt was the author of the heraldic and genealogical chronicle Miroir des nobles de Hesbaye ("Mirror of the Nobles of Hesbaye"), running to the year 1398, as well as an account of the 38-year feud (1297—1335) between the lineages of Awans and Waroux, Le Traité des Guerres d'Awans et de Waroux, and a treatise on the political institutions of the Prince-Bishopric of Liège, Le Patron de la Temporalité. His works were not widely known or circulated during his lifetime.
