= Jan van Boendale =

Flemish writer

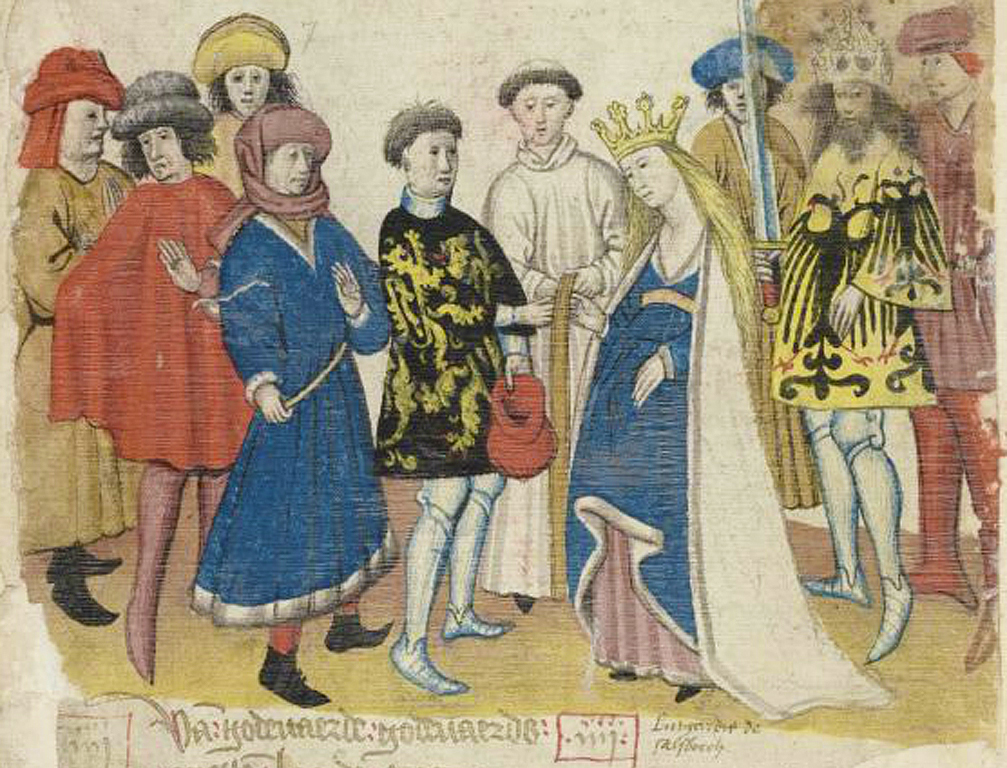
Illustration from a manuscript of Boendale's Brabantsche yeesten

Jan van Boendale (c.1280 – c.1351), formerly sometimes known as Jan De Klerk ("Jan the Clerk") was a 14th-century secretary of the city of Antwerp and author of narrative and didactic verse. He was an influential official in Antwerp. Two of his works, Brabantsche yeesten and Der leken spieghel, are listed in the Canon of Dutch Literature compiled by the Digital Library for Dutch Literature.

== Life ==
Jan was born in Boendale, near Tervuren, near the end of the 13th century. He moved to Antwerp, where he became secretary to the city council, and lived there until his death around 1351. He undertook a number of diplomatic missions on behalf of the city of Antwerp or of the States of Brabant, and in 1332 was present in the entourage of John III, Duke of Brabant, at Heylissem.

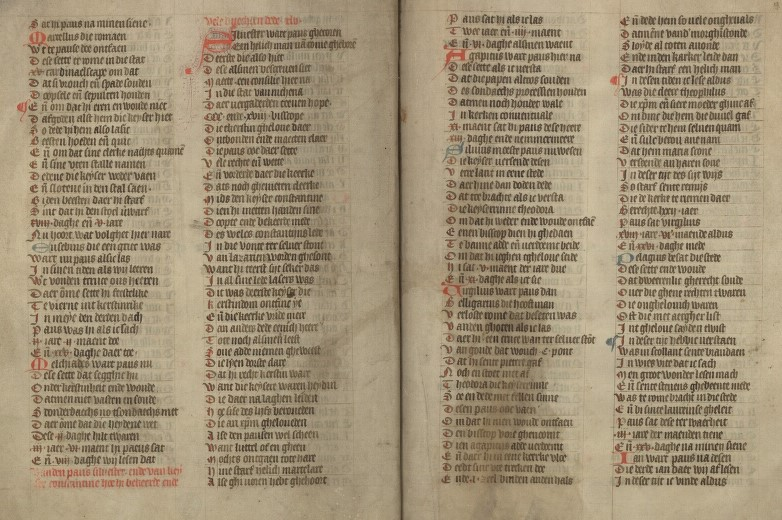
Excerpt from a manuscript of Der leken spieghel. Manufactured in the first half of the 15th century. Preserved in the University Library of Ghent.

== Works ==
- Brabantsche yeesten (a history of the duchy of Brabant)
- Der leken spieghel (a history of salvation)
- Jans Testeye (a dialogue on controverted questions in philosophy and law)
- Van den derden Eduwaert (an account of Edward III of England's arrival in the Low Countries and his Tournaisis campaign of 1340)
- Die dietsche doctrinale (a didactic poem in three books)
