= Brabantsche Yeesten =

Rhymed chronicle

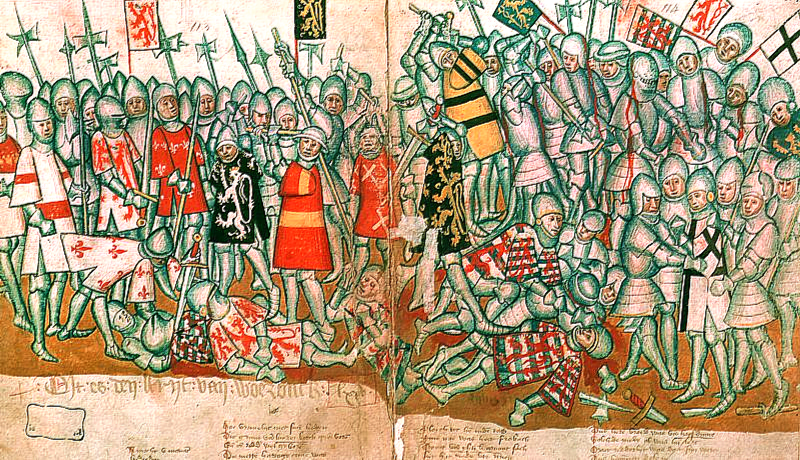
Illustration showing the Battle of Worringen of 1288 (KBR mss. IV 684, mid 15th century)

The Brabantsche Yeesten or Gestes de Brabant (lit. 'Brabantian Deeds') is a rhyming chronicle of some 46,000 verses written in the 14th and 15th centuries in the Middle Dutch language. It provides a history of the Duchy of Brabant, and the original five volumes were written by Jan van Boendale (c. 1280–c. 1351) of Antwerp; his text was later extended to seven volumes by an anonymous continuator.

== Composition and authorship ==
Van Boendale's text was written between around 1318 and around 1350, commissioned for a member of the Antwerp patriciate. It extends to 16,318 verses. Boendale's main sources were the Chronica de origine ducum Brabantiae of 1294 and Spieghel Historiael of Jacob van Maerlant. Much of the text of the first three books are taken from Jacob van Maerlant almost verbatim. The events in book five are from Boendale's own lifetime.

Books six and seven, which extend the scope of the chronicled events to 1440, were written by an anonymous continuator. Some scholars attribute these books to Wein van Cotthem; others to Hennen van Merchtenen, amongst other candidates. Book six is dated 1432 and book seven is dated 1440; this latter date is also the approximate age of the oldest extant manuscripts of the text.

== Manuscripts and editions ==
There are seven extant manuscript copies.

- Two 15th-century manuscripts are held by the Royal Library of Belgium in Brussels (mss. IV 684 and IV 685).

The text was first edited by Jan Frans Willems and Jean Henri Bormans beginning in 1839.

== Literature ==
- Jan Frans Willems: De Brabantsche Yeesten (3 vols., Brussels 1839, 1843, 1869). vol. 2 available online.
- Katell De Groote: Jan Van Boendaele, Brabantse Yeesten, XXIV. M.A. dissertation at the Katholieke Universiteit Leuven, 2003.
- Reynaert, Joris (1 March 2019). "Hennen van Merchtenen en de Voortzetting van de Brabantsche yeesten (ca. 1430-1450): Een bijdrage aan de attributieproblematiek" [Hennen van Merchtenen and the Continuation of the Brabantsche Yeesten (c. 1430–1450): a contribution to the debate on attribution]. Nederlandse Letterkunde (in Dutch). 24 (1): 1–33. doi:10.5117/NEDLET2019.1.001.REYN. ISSN 1384-5829.
