= Charles Wautier =

- Born: c. 1609; Mons, County of Hainaut, Habsburg Netherlands
- Died: 2 December 1703; Brussels, Duchy of Brabant, Habsburg Netherlands
- Notable work: Portrait of James, Duke of York (Royal Collection)
- Movement: Flemish Baroque painting
- Family: Michaelina Wautier (sister)

Charles Wautier, also Woutiers (c. 1609 – 2 December 1703), was a Flemish Baroque painter, active in Brussels in the second half of the 17th century. He was a brother of Michaelina Wautier (1614–1689), another painter.

== Life ==
Baptised in Mons on 15 August 1609, he and Michaelina were children of Charles Qautier (died 24 November 1617) and his second wife Jeanne George (died 19 June 1638), who had been born in Valenciennes. or more likely in Mons. She was the only surviving daughter from her father's eleven children by two marriages. Charles senior's family was an old and rich one from Mons, capital of the county of Hainault - since the 15th century members of the family had been town clerks, counsellors, administrators and soldiers. and it was later ennobled and changed to 'de Wautier'. Charles senior had spent some time in the service of the count of Fuentes, Spanish governor of the Southern Netherlands.

Charles junior and Michaelina are the only two known artists in the family and it is unclear why they both took up that profession. Neither of them ever married. Charles junior was initially considered to be a pupil of Rubens, but it is more probable that he studied outside the Southern Netherlands and the Dutch Republic, possibly in Italy according to Katlijne Van der Stighelen - he stated as much on finally signing up to Brussels' Guild of Saint Luke in 1651.

He moved to Brussels in 1633, followed by his sister around 1638–1642. They seem to have share the same lodgings and a single studio and came to be mistaken for husband and wife. They may have travelled to Italy, France and Madrid together around this time. He joined the Guild in 1652, a legal prerequisite to practice as a professional painter, to sign paintings that he sold and to take apprentices.s Van der Stighelen records him as having seven pupils between 1653 and 1686, whilst noting that this list is probably incomplete and that none of them had major careers of their own - Tomas Monnorino, Pier Vyvier, Ambrosius (?), François Volson (or Hosson, or Volsom ?), Jan Baptist Tel, Peter van Bellen and Gillis Wauters.

As a portraitist, Charles quickly became famous among the elite, receiving commissions from princes of the Ligne and Croÿ families, from the counts of Merode and the lords of Grimbergen, and from other noble families. Whilst in exile James, Duke of York also commissioned him. He even received commissions for standing portraits from Archduke Leopold Wilhelm of Austria. He is one of twelve painters active in Brussels to be mentioned in Namurian painter Florent du Rieu's poems honouring famous contemporary artists (Note: The others active in Brussels were Jan van den Hoecke, David Teniers the Younger, Peeter Snayers, Gaspar de Crayer, Michael Sweerts, Jacques d'Arthois and Jan Baptist van Heil) - the quatrain of praise to Wautier calls him a "painter of portraits".

Un 1662, Peeter Snayers, a battle-paintings specialist, obtained testimonials as to the value of one of his paintings from five renowned Brussels-based artists, namely Wautier, Gaspar de Crayer, David Teniers the Younger, Daniel van Heil and Luigi Primo. Unlike the others, Wautier wrote his certificate for Snayers in French - it survives in Valenciennes as a confirmed signature for the painter. He always signed with the French version of his name, Wautier, and he was known as "Monsieur" Wautier, though it was also spelled Wauthiers and Woutiers, which (like his sister's work) complicates research into his work and later attributions.

The brother and sister had a flourishing business, buying land, along with in 1668 a beautiful house with outbuildings near the Church of Our Lady of the Chapel. They later bought other houses in the same district of Marollen and in the district of Sablon. Charles' last signed paintings date to 1685, although Michaelina seems to have stopped painting (or at least switched to only assisting her brother) in 1659. He was his sister's heir and after her death solely worked on his real estate and financial affairs, dying childless in Brussels aged 94.

== Oeuvre ==
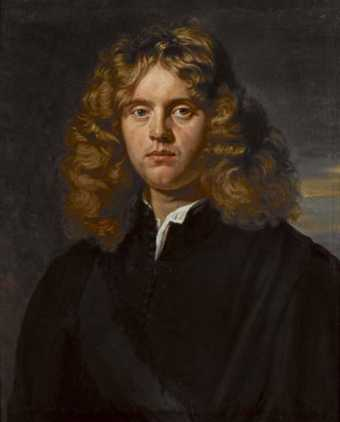
Unknown Man, 1656 - possibly a selfportrait.

Wautier mainly painted religious works and portraits of Flemish nobility or other nobles staying in the Southern Netherlands, particularly officers serving in the Habsburg army and navy. He confined himself to those genres and produced no still lives, genre scenes or landscapes, all considered low in the hierarchy of artistic genres. The signed and dated 1656 portrait of a man in a black doublet departs from usual depictions of such men in armour or elaborate costume - he may have been a friend or relation of the artist or perhaps even the painter himself. He did not work on large-scale canvases, unlike Michaelina's The Triumph of Bacchus. His output was less varied and less original than hers and so he is even less discussed than her.

His style of portraiture is similar to that of Anthony van Dyck, to whom some of his unsigned works have been misattributed in the past, and of David Teniers the Younger, though he is less skilled than both of them at depicting hands and fingers. Katlijne Van der Stighelen and Pierre-Yves Kairis argue that Michaelina may have given him technical help with the hair and faces and that the artists collaborated more than once on the same paintings. Van der Stighelen and Jahel Sanzsalazar argue that Charles' religious works are influenced by Caravaggio, Theodoor van Loon and Jusepe de Ribera, · particularly in their chiaroscuro effects and dark neutral backgrounds.

== Selected works ==
=== Religious ===
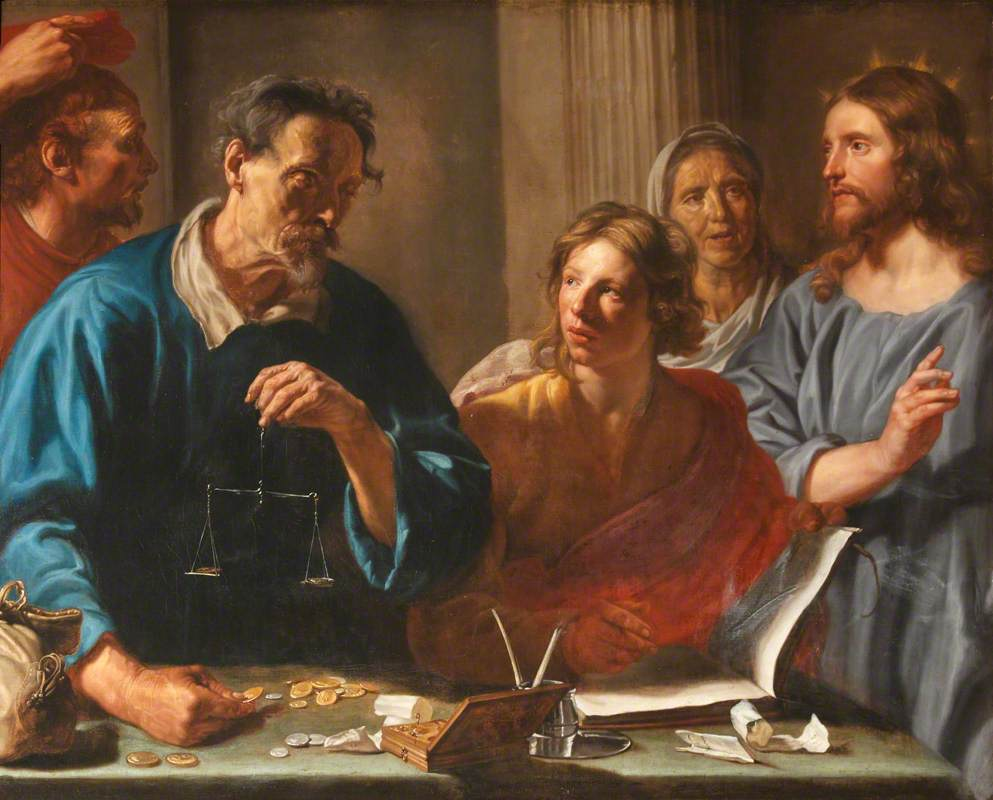
The Calling of St Matthew

- Jesus and the Pharisees
- Visitation, formerly in the church of Saint-Augustin, Antwerp
- Pope Alexander III and Saint Bernard of Clairvaux, hôtel de ville, Louvain
- Saint John the Evangelist
- Saint John of Alexandria (attribution still to be confirmed), church of Saint-Amand, Uitkerke
- The Death of Abel, lost
- The Calling of Saint Matthew
  - Osterley Park
  - musée des Augustins de Toulouse (Note: Replica of the Osterley version.) (c.1650)
- Prophet (or Evangelist), signed and dated 1652, musée des Beaux-Arts de Cambrai
- The Miracle of Saint Eligius (1659), church of Saint-Servais, Gimnée
- The Presentation in the Temple (1661), previously Musées royaux des Beaux-Arts de Belgique (Brussels) (Note: Probably lost, known from a black and white photograph.)
- Saint Peter Receiving the Keys from Christ (1685), high altarpiece for Saint Peter's Church, Leuven

=== History painting and mythology ===
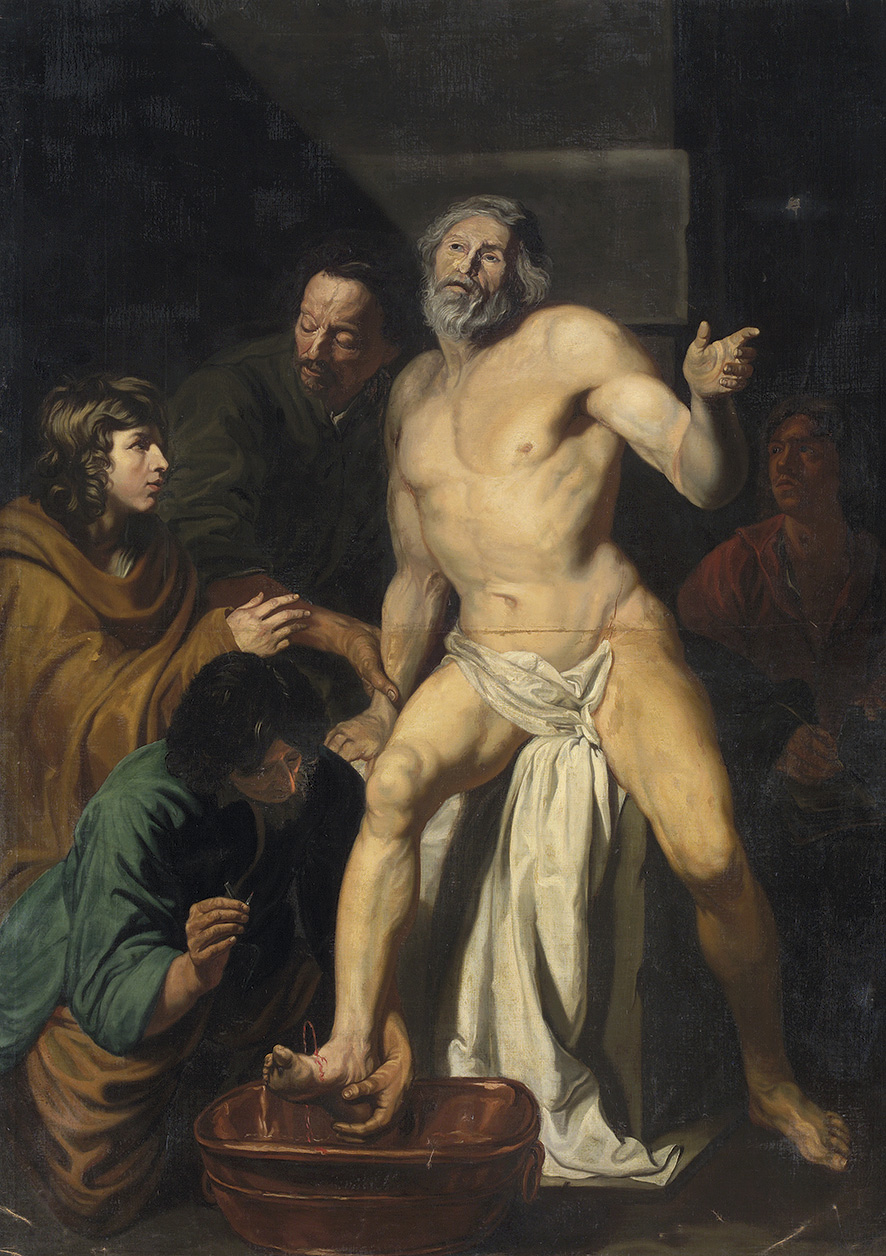
The Death of Seneca.

- The Death of Seneca, Kunsthistorisches Museum, Vienna
- Apollo and Marsyas, lost
- Young Bacchus Crowned with Vineleaves (1652), National Gallery of Prague

=== Portraits ===
- Unknown officer in armour
- A Herald of Charles II, Royal Museum of Fine Arts Antwerp
- Portrait of a Field Marshal, château de Belœil (Note: According to P.Y. Kairis and J. Sanzsalazar several unsigned portraits of officers in this château can be attributed to Charles Wautier)
- Leopold-Wilhelm von Habsburg (1652), Hluboká Castle, Hluboká nad Vltavou (Czech Republic)
- Unknown man (1656), musées royaux des Beaux-Arts de Belgique (possible self portrait)
- James, Duke of York (Note: An engraving of this painting by Pieter de Jode II enables it to be attributed to Wautier. It was bought for the Royal Collection by Elizabeth II of the United Kingdom in 1960) (c.1656-60)
- Woman in a blue rob holding flowers (1660)
- Portrait d'homme (1660), musées royaux des Beaux-Arts de Belgique
- Count Ferdinand Gaston Lamoral de Croÿ (c.1660), château du Rœulx ·
- Count Ferdinand-Gaston Lamoral de Croÿ et du Roeulx, château des Princes de Ligne
- Jacques Neutre, abbé of the Abbey of Val des Écoliers, Mons (1668), BAM

Several other portraits (now lost or in private collections) are attested to by engravings of them by Pieter de Jode II, Cornelis Meyssens, Joannes Meyssens and Cornelis Galle. :

- Pieter de Jode II :
  - Charles-Albert de Longueval, count of Bucquoy and Gratzen, baron of Vaux and Rosenberg (1651)
  - Antonio Pimentel de Prado, Spanish ambassador to Sweden and France, counsellor to and lover of Christina of Sweden (1659)

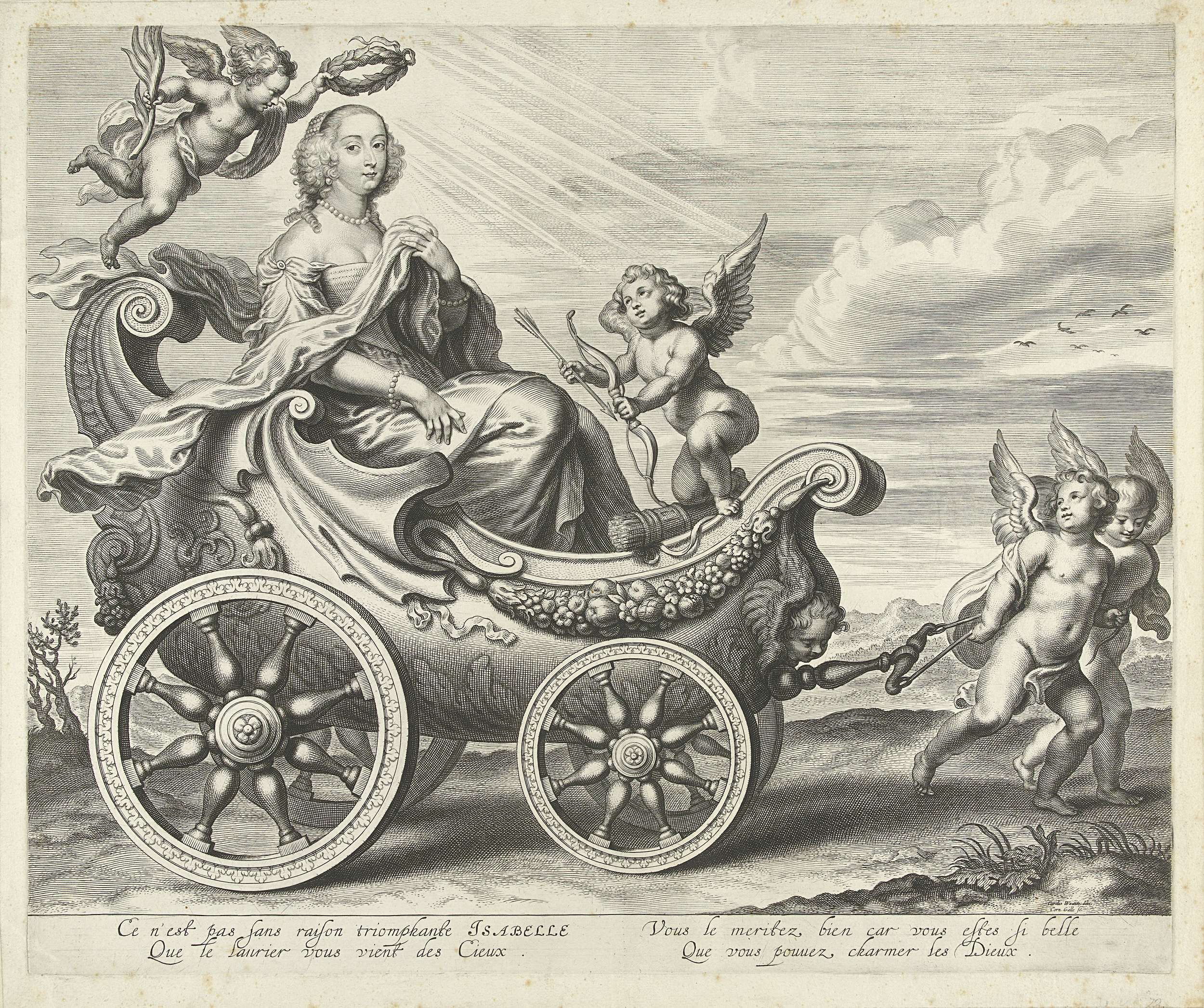
The Triumph of Clara Isabella de Ligne-Arenberg

- Cornelis Meyssens :
  - Ferdinando Carlo Gonzaga (1670)
  - Francisco de Velasco y Cárdenas, comte de Colmenar de Oreja
  - Eugène de Berghes, count of Grimbergen and baron of Arquennes
  - Florence Marguerite Van Renesse Van Elderen, countess of Grimbergen, épouse du précédent
  - Jean-Charles de Watteville, marquis of Conflans and count of Bussolin
- Joannes Meyssens :
  - Ulrich, duke of Wurtemberg, cavalry general in the Southern Netherlands (c.1650)
  - Éléonore de Merode (1635–1669), countess of Hornes Hautekerque (1651)
- Cornelis Galle the Younger :
  - Clara Isabella, princess of Ligne-Arenberg, accompanied by Cupid, in a triumphal chariot drawn by two putti (1648)

== Gallery ==
=== Portraits ===
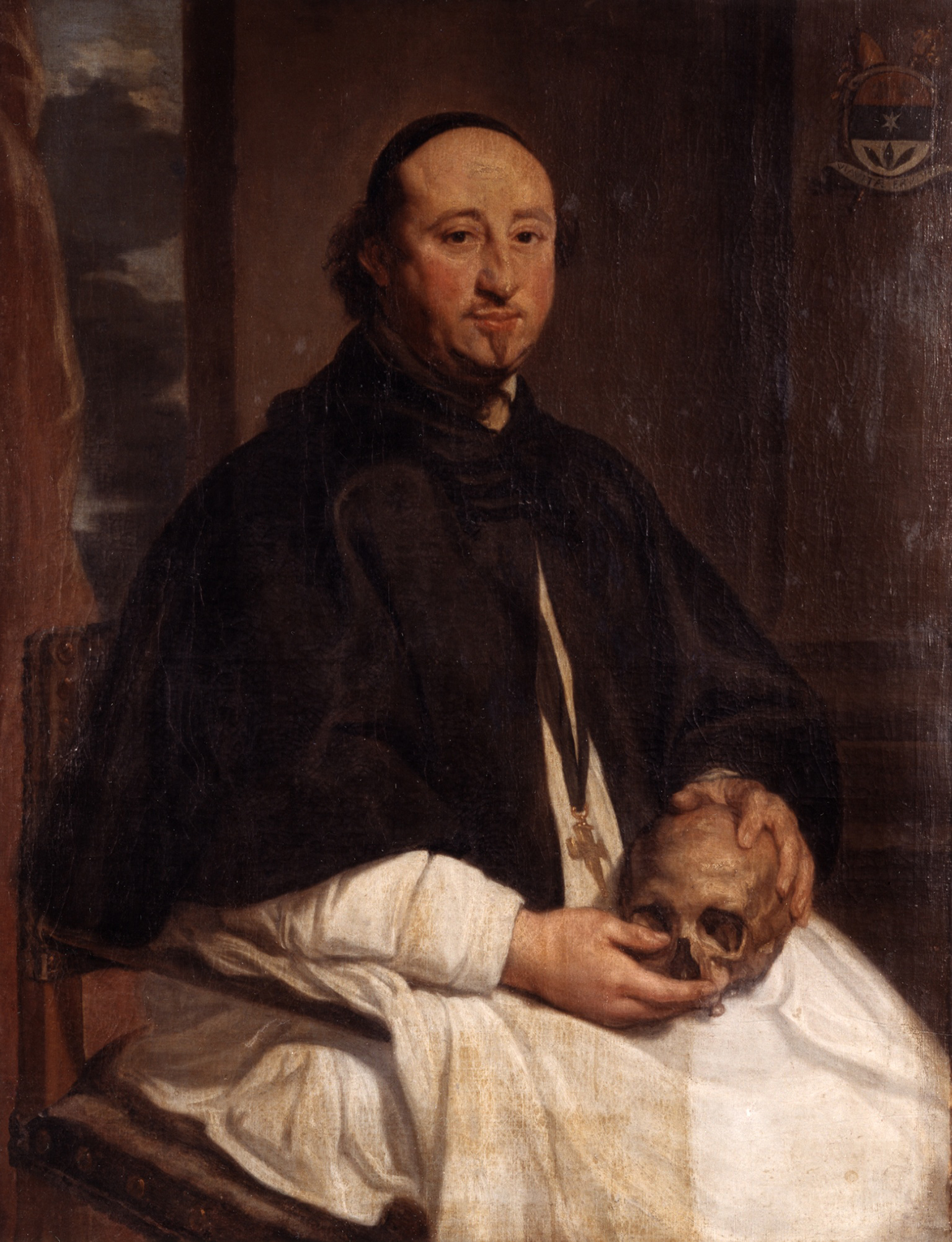
Abbé Jacques Neutre

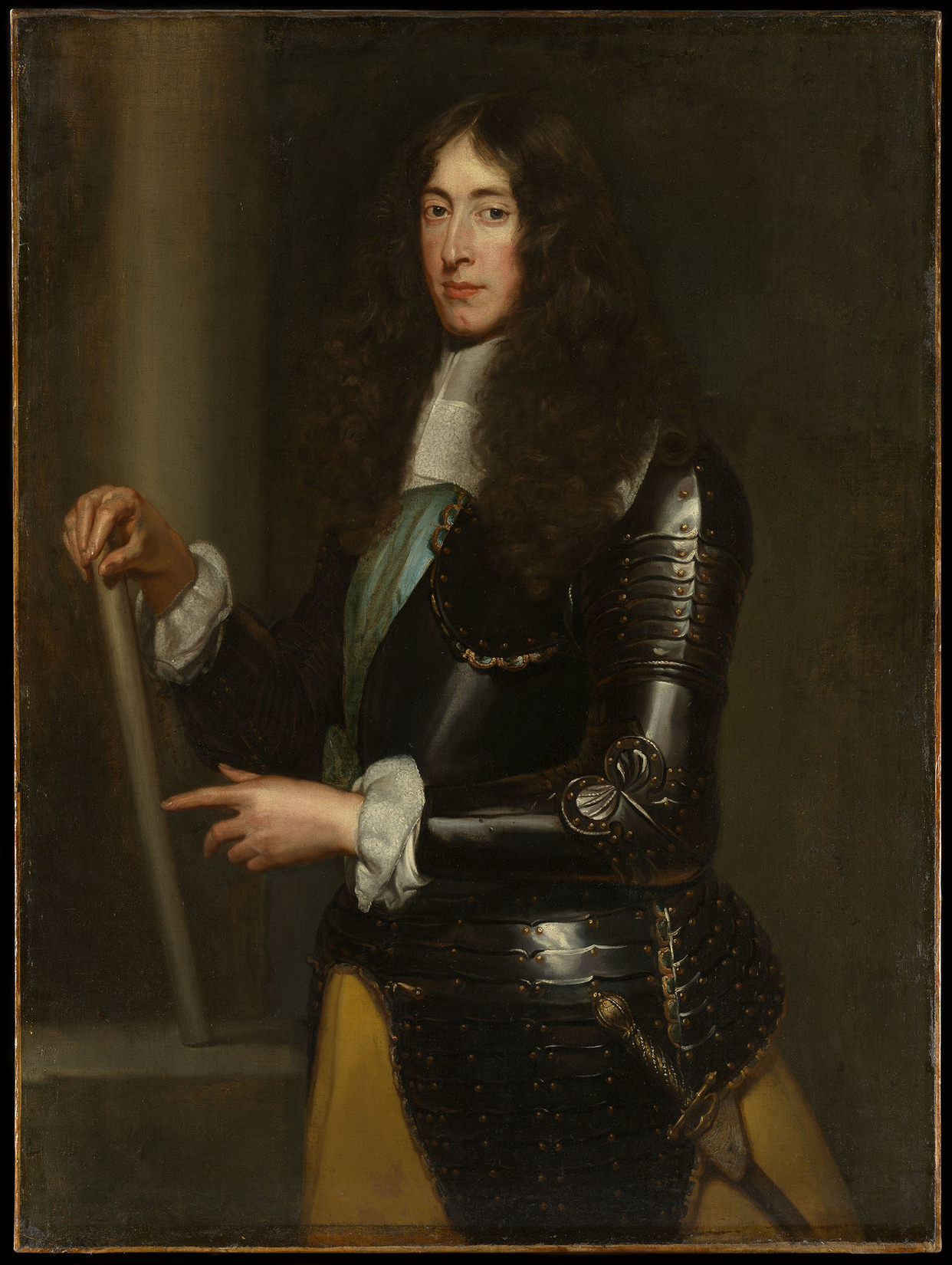
James, Duke of York

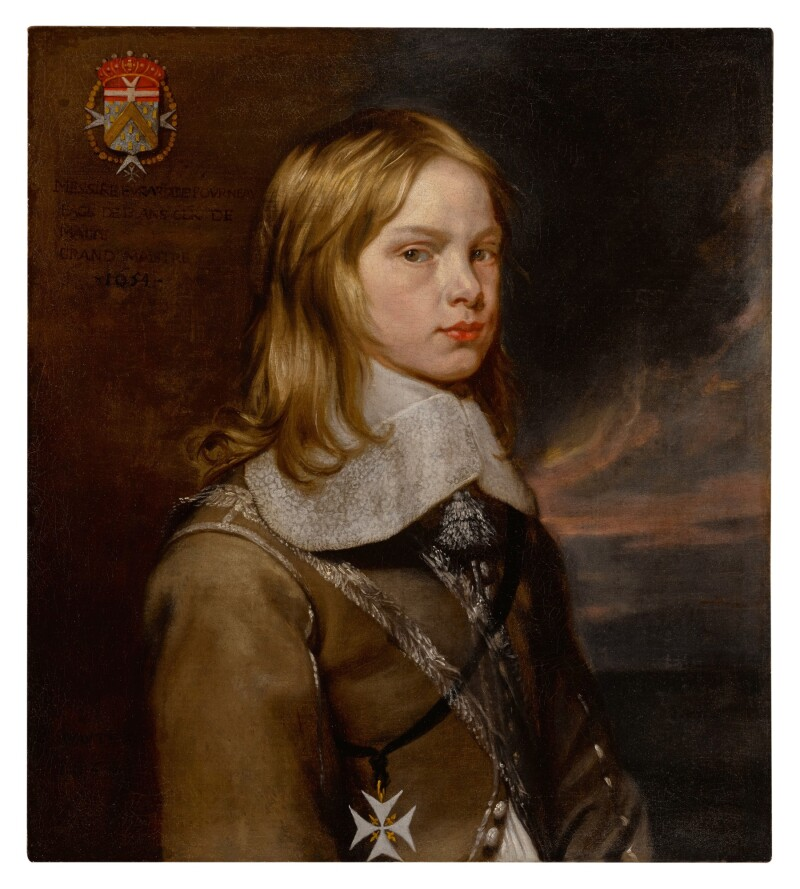
Evrard de Fourneau de Cruyckenbourg aged thirteen

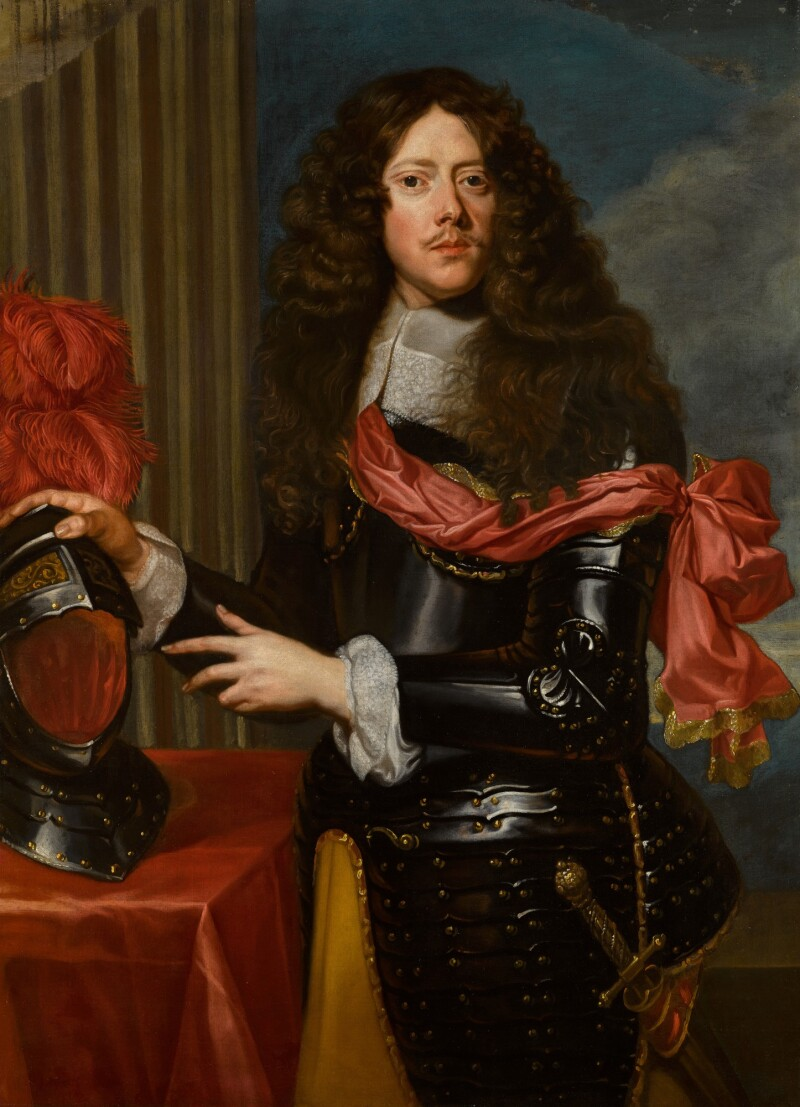
A gentleman in armour

=== Engravings after portraits ===
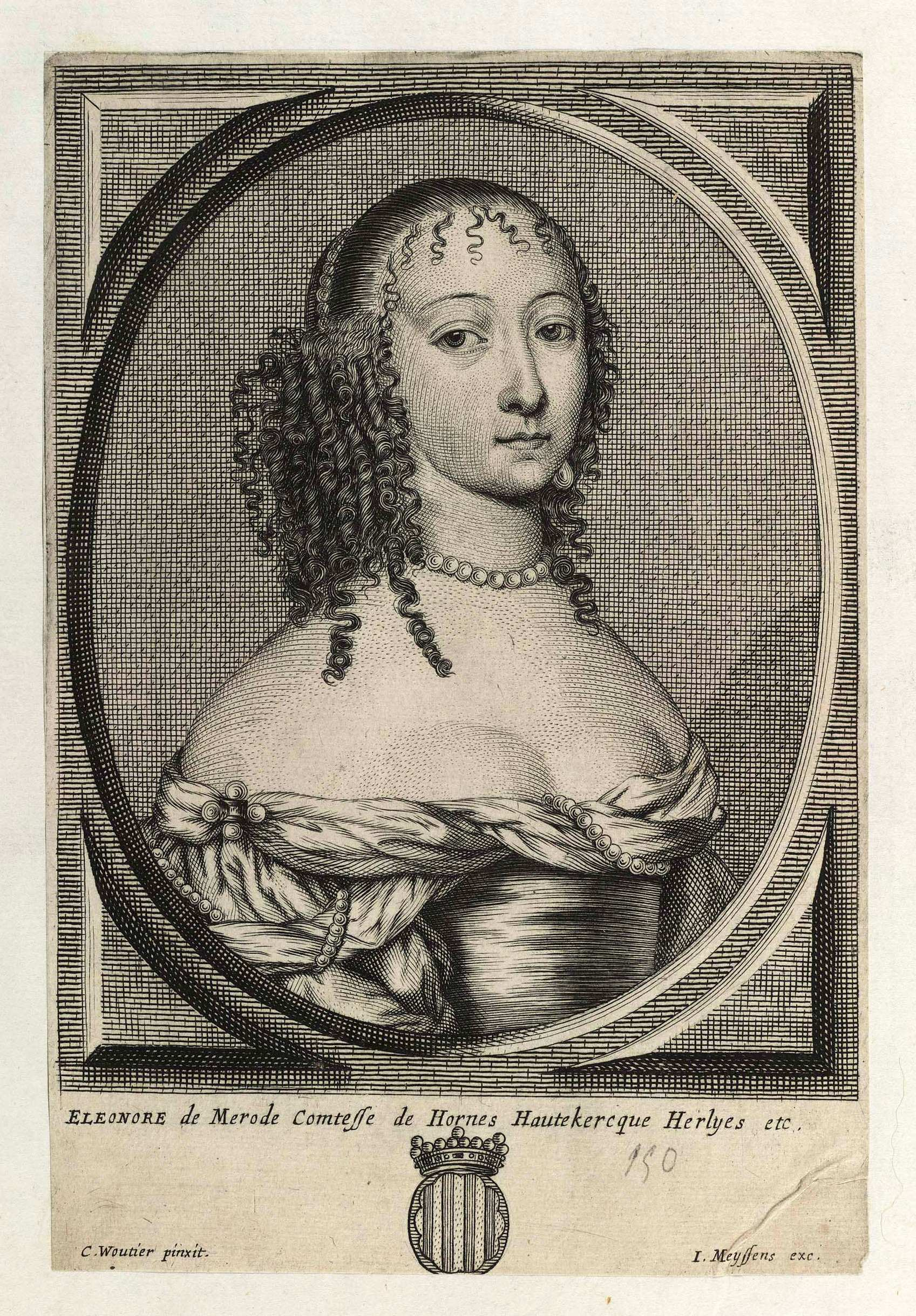
Éléonore de Merode

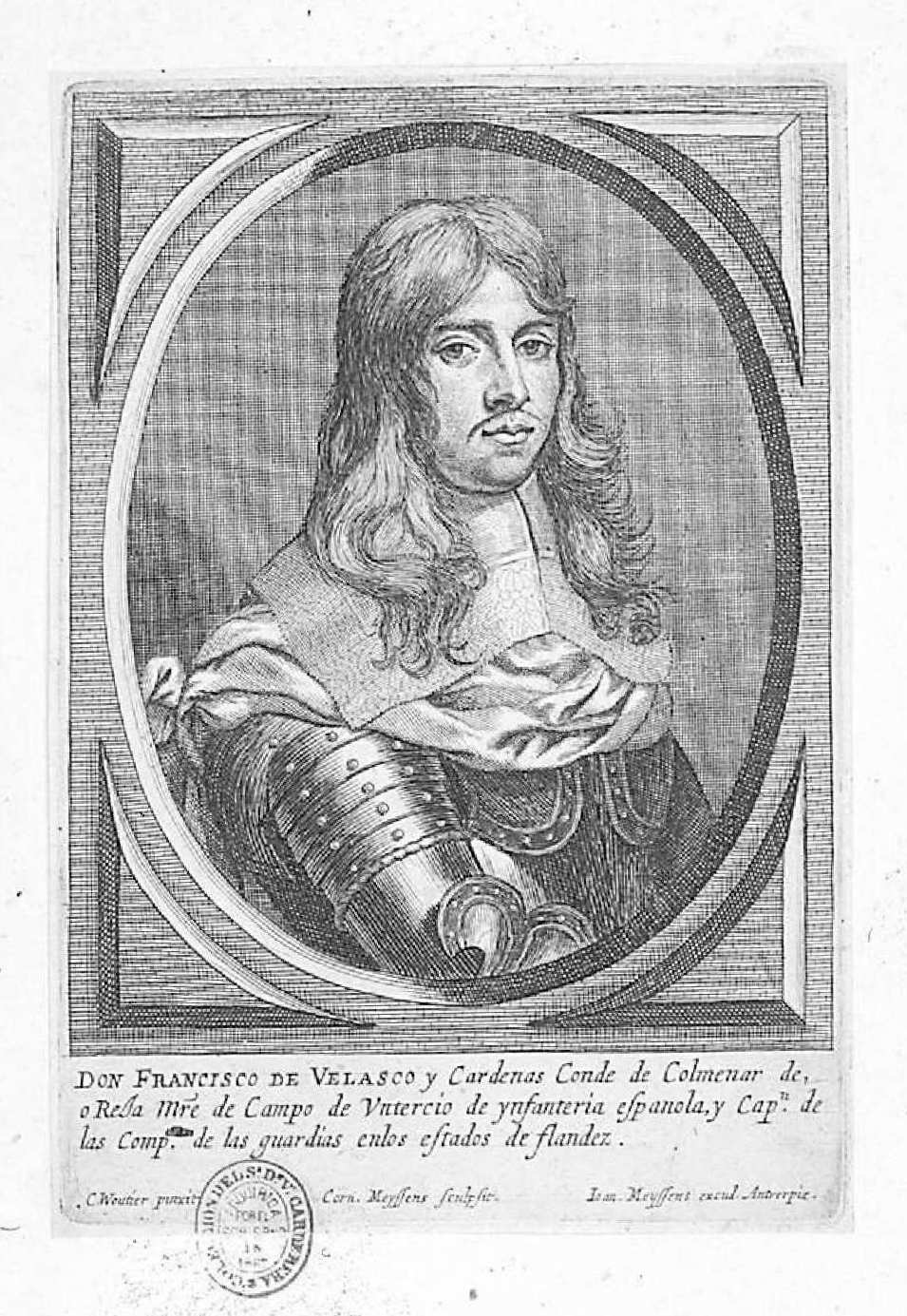
Don Francisco Velasco y Cárdenas

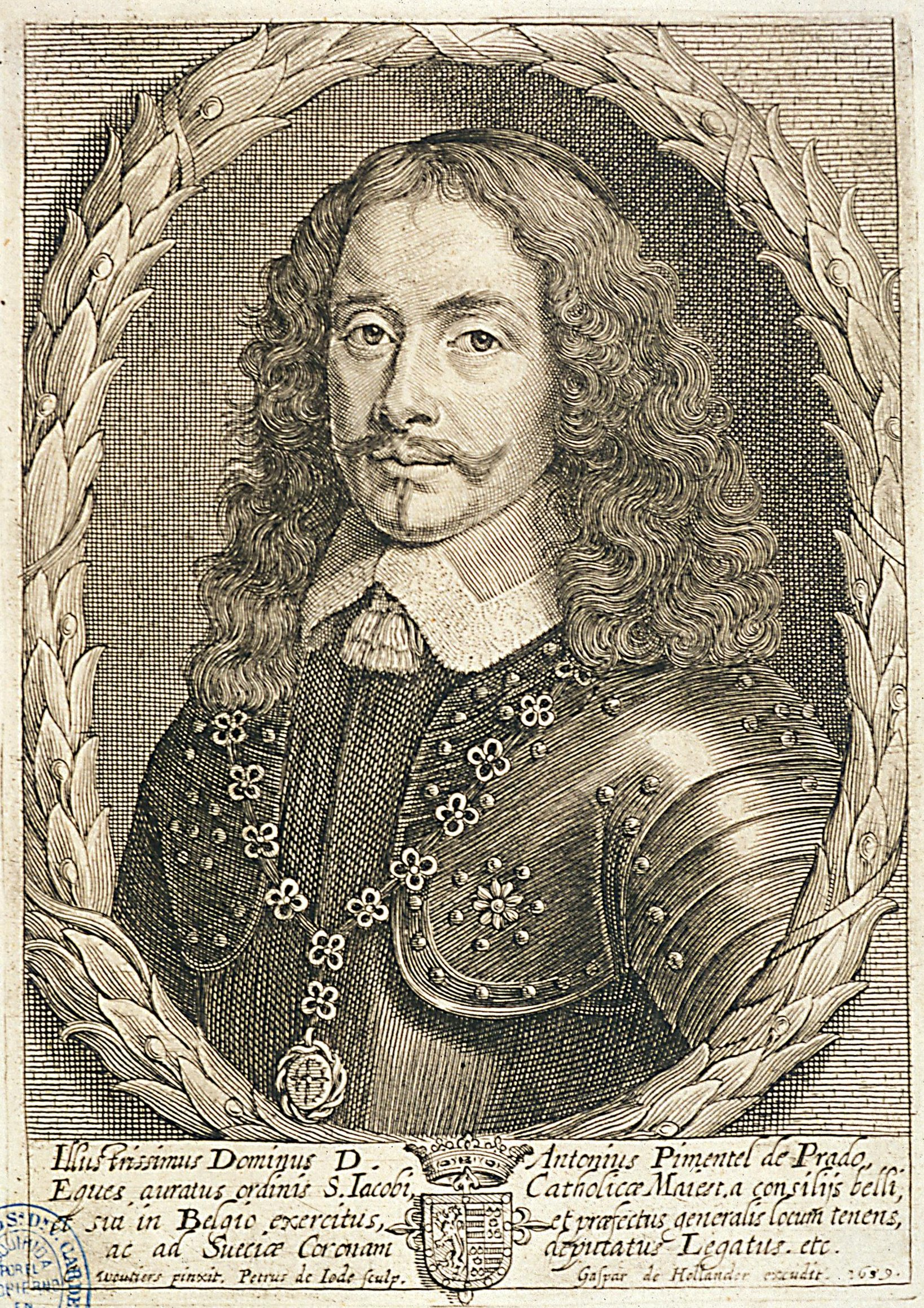
Don Antonio Pimentel de Prado

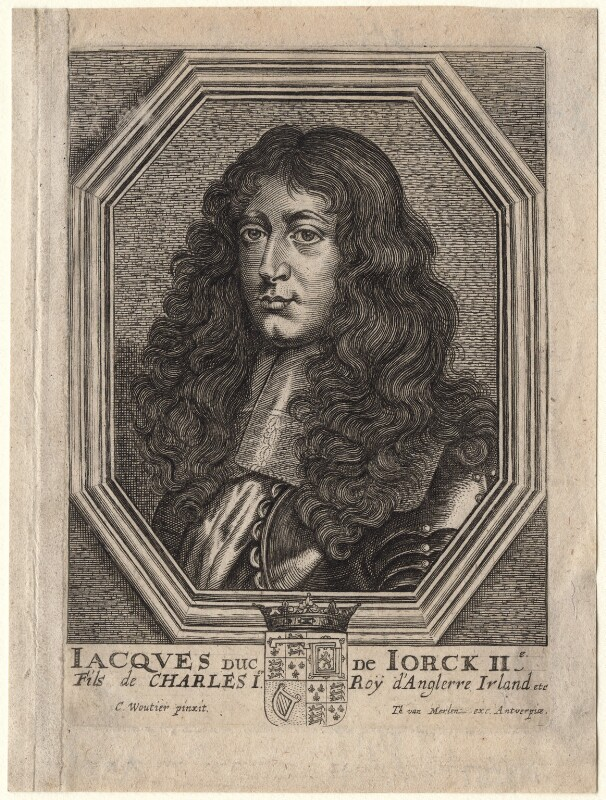
James, Duke of York

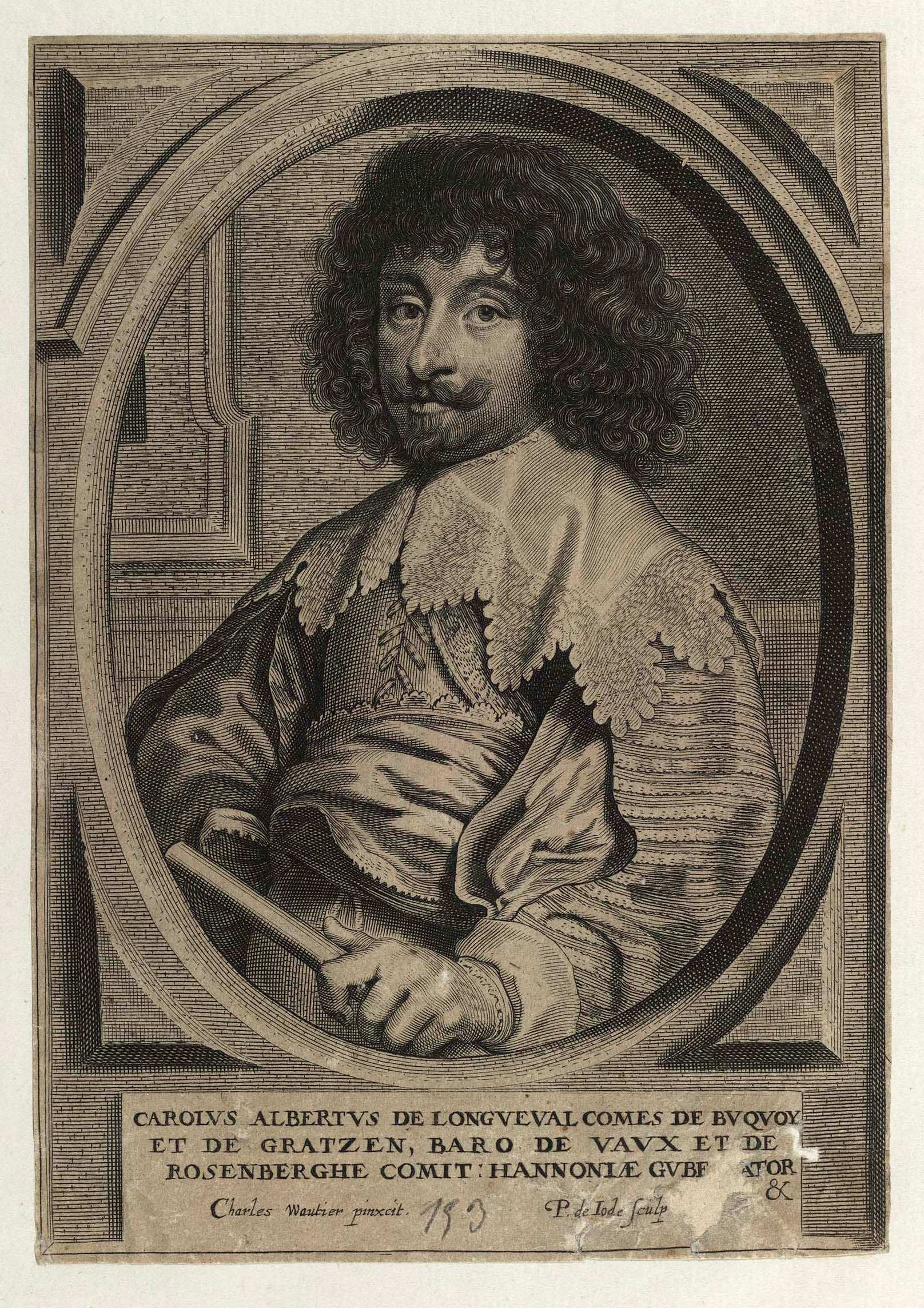
Charles-Albert de Longueval

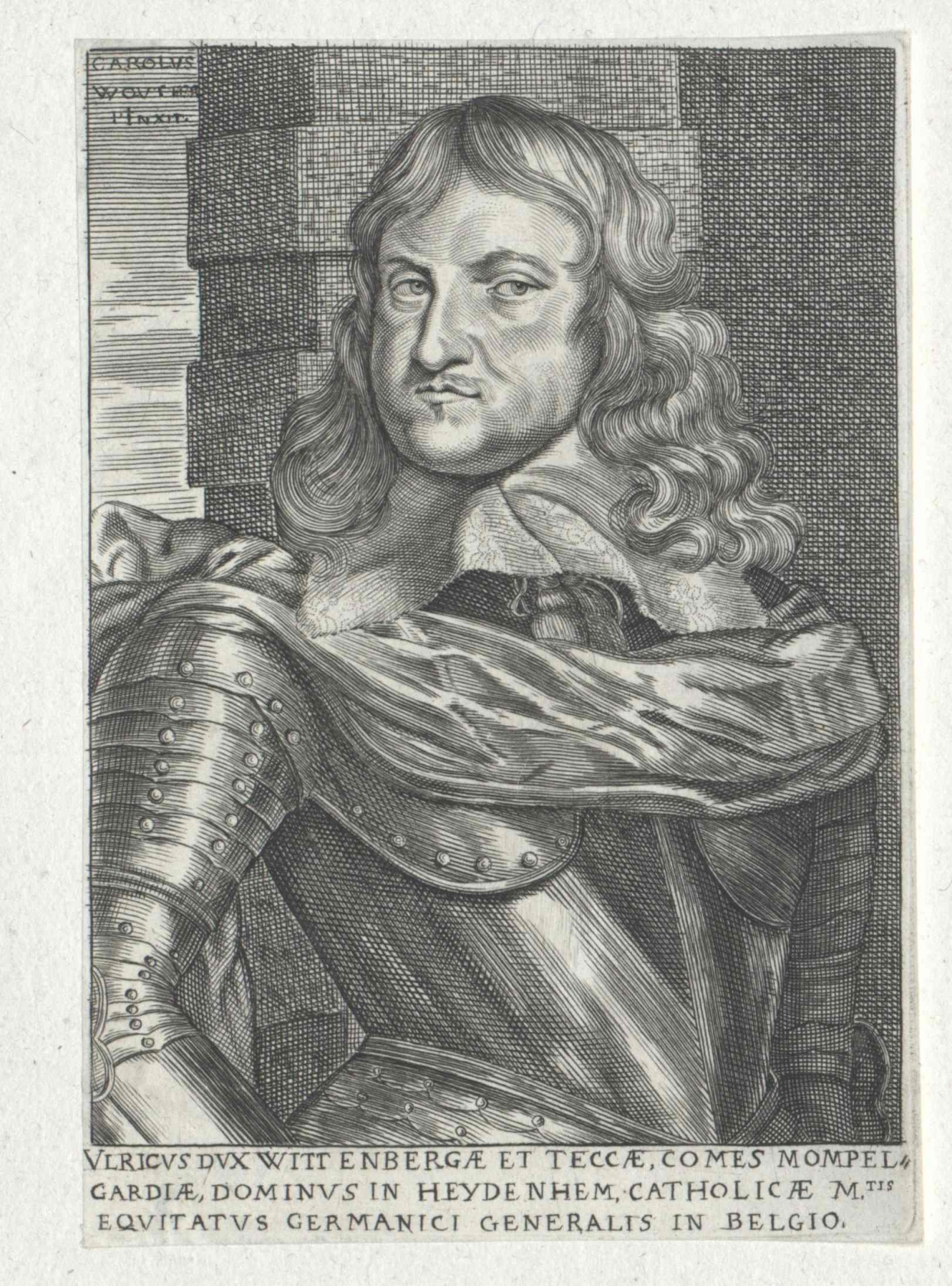
Ulrich, duke of Wurtemberg

== Exhibitions ==
Several paintings by Charles Wautier and engravings after his painted portraits were displayed at the Museum aan de Stroom in Antwerp during the exhibition "Michaelina - Baroque's Leading Lady" from 1 June to 2 September 2018. and in "Michaelina Wautier, Malerin", an exhibition at the Kunsthistorisches Museum in Vienna from 29 September 2025 to 22 February 2026.

== Bibliography ==
- Katlijne Van der Stighelen (ed.), Gerlinde Gruber, Jahel Sanzsalazar, Martha Howell, Francesca Del Torre Scheuch, Ben van Beneden et al. (with catalogue, family tree of Charles senior's descendents, bibliography, index), Michaelina Wautier, 1604-1689: Glorifying a Forgotten Talent, Anvers, BAI Rubenshuis, 2018, 323 p. (ISBN 978-90-8586-763-0).
- Anne Delvingt, Pierre-Yves Kairis and Gerlinde Gruber (ed.s), Michaelina Wautier, Vienne, Kunsthistorisches Museum, 2025, 192 p. (ISBN 978-3-99020-256-2), Charles Wautier: Status quaestionis, p. 71-87.
