= The Five Senses (Wautier) =

1650 set of five paintings

Taste
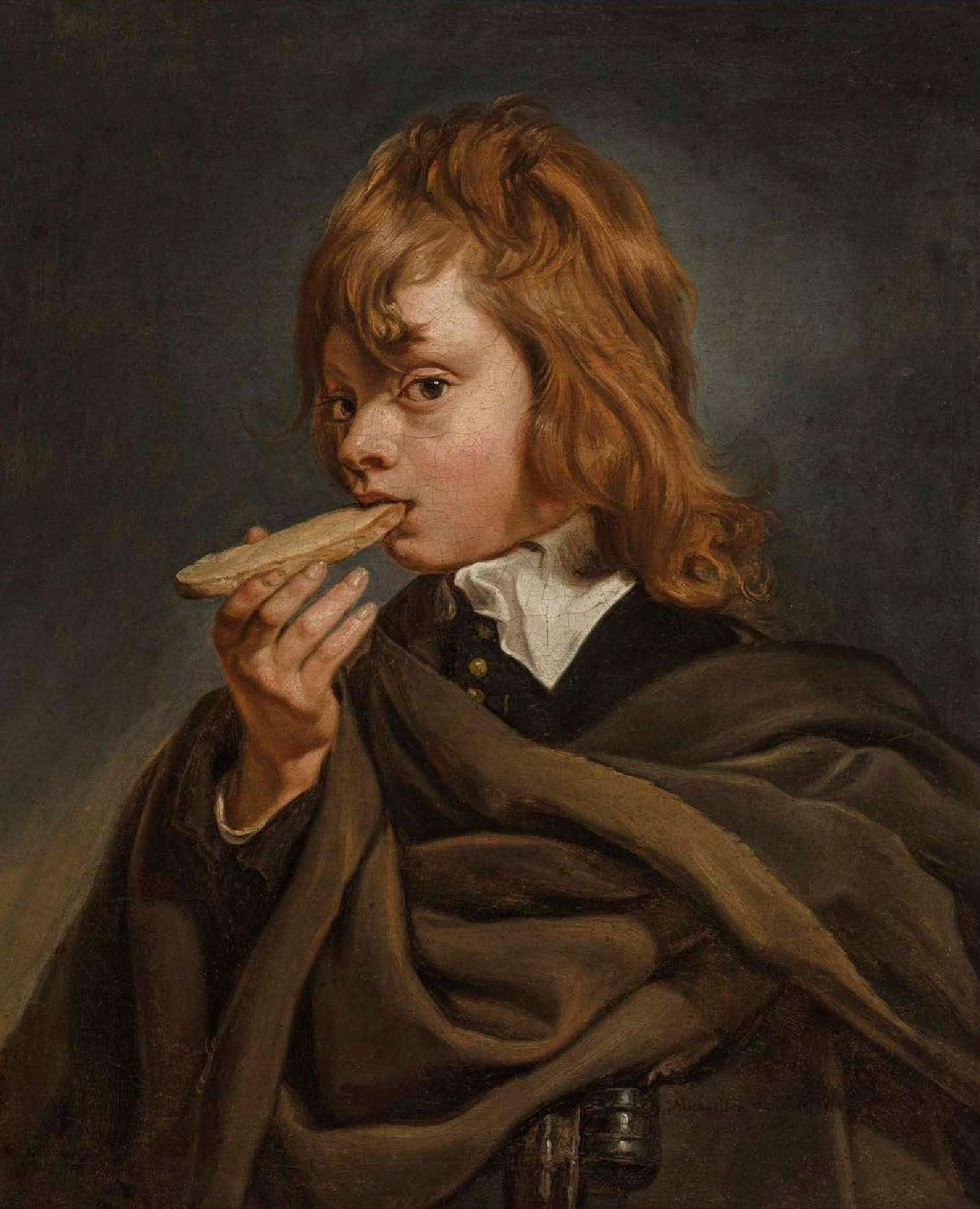
- Taste, part of the series
- Artist: Michaelina Wautier
- Year: 1650
- Location: Museum of Fine Arts, Boston

The Five Senses is a series of allegorical paintings of sight, smell, taste, hearing, and touch, painted by Flemish artist Michaelina Wautier in 1650. Each sense is personified by a young boy. The paintings are on loan to the Museum of Fine Arts, Boston by their owners, Rose-Marie and Eijk van Otterloo.

== History ==
=== Artist ===
Michaelina Wautier was a Baroque painter from the Southern Netherlands. Although overlooked after her death, Wautier was an accomplished artist in her day. At the age of 30, Wautier moved to Brussels along with her brother Charles, also a painter. While in Brussels, she painted her first self-portrait in 1649. Wautier also painted a handful of works the same year she was working on The Five Senses. Her Triumph of Bacchus was painted between 1650 and 1656 and is considered one of her greatest works. Her work at the time also included Two Boys Blowing Bubbles (1650).

== Description ==
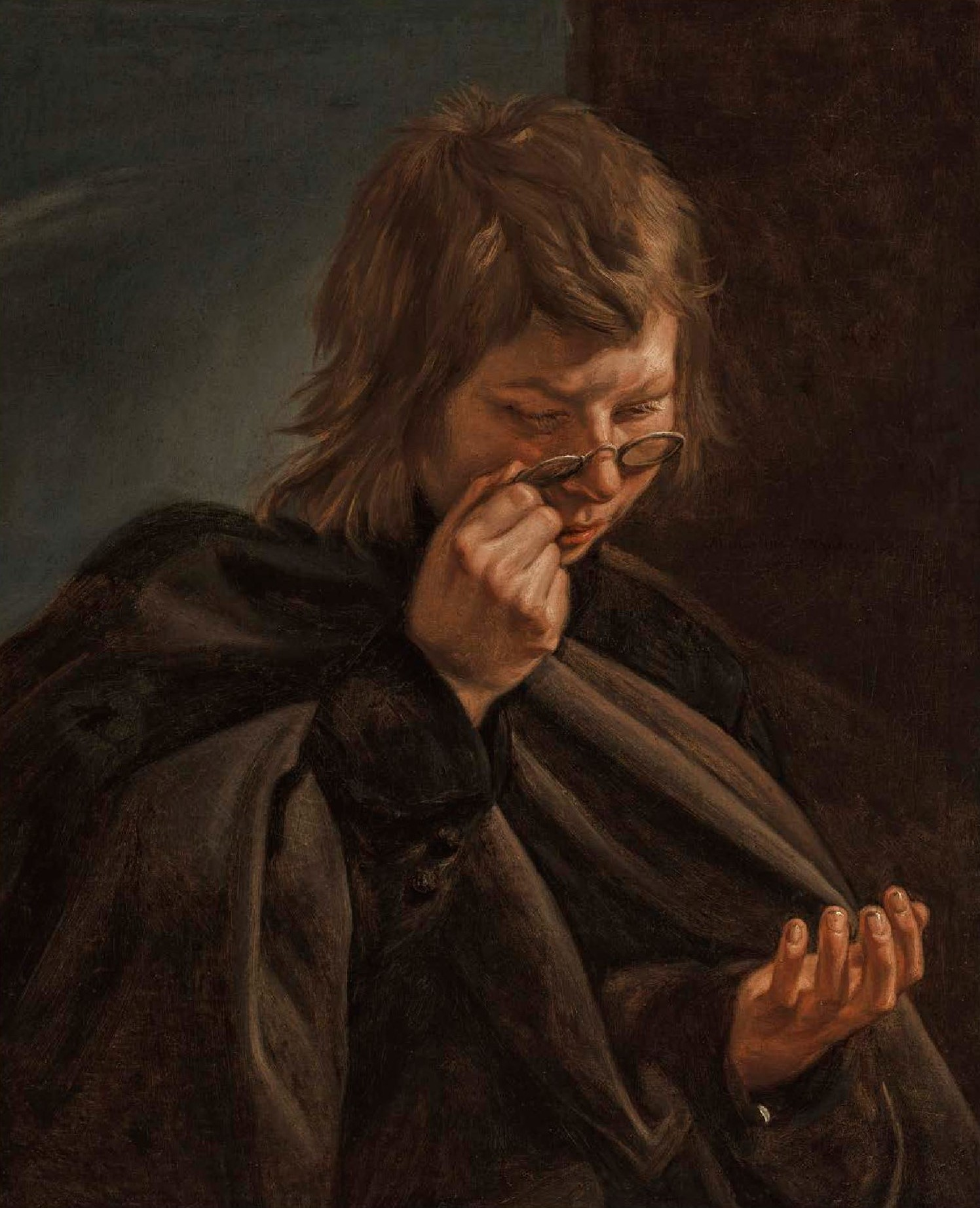
Sight, Michaelina Wautier, 1650, Museum of Fine Arts, Boston, 69.5x61cm

Wautier's series depicts an allegory of the five senses, a popular theme in Dutch and Flemish art of the seventeenth century. The paintings are in the Museum of Fine Arts, Boston, its gallery space may be considered the first in the Americas dedicated to the art of Wautier. The painting Sight has the subject turned to the right and Touch, the last painting, is facing to the left of the enclosure. The subjects in both Hearing and Taste are seen facing the center, balancing one another. Then Smell is placed in the middle as the subject is staring directly forward, thus making both ends of the collection shift movement towards the center.

=== Sight ===
Wautier shows a young boy in a cloak holding a pair of glasses up to his eyes, looking intently at his palm. The blue-gray shades on the viewer's left and the dark brown shades on the right are separated by a line that the young boy is placed in front of a corner. The wrinkles on his forehead and curled eyebrows indicate confusion and focus. The light comes from the viewer's right, where the light shines across the young boy's face and onto his left hand.

=== Hearing ===
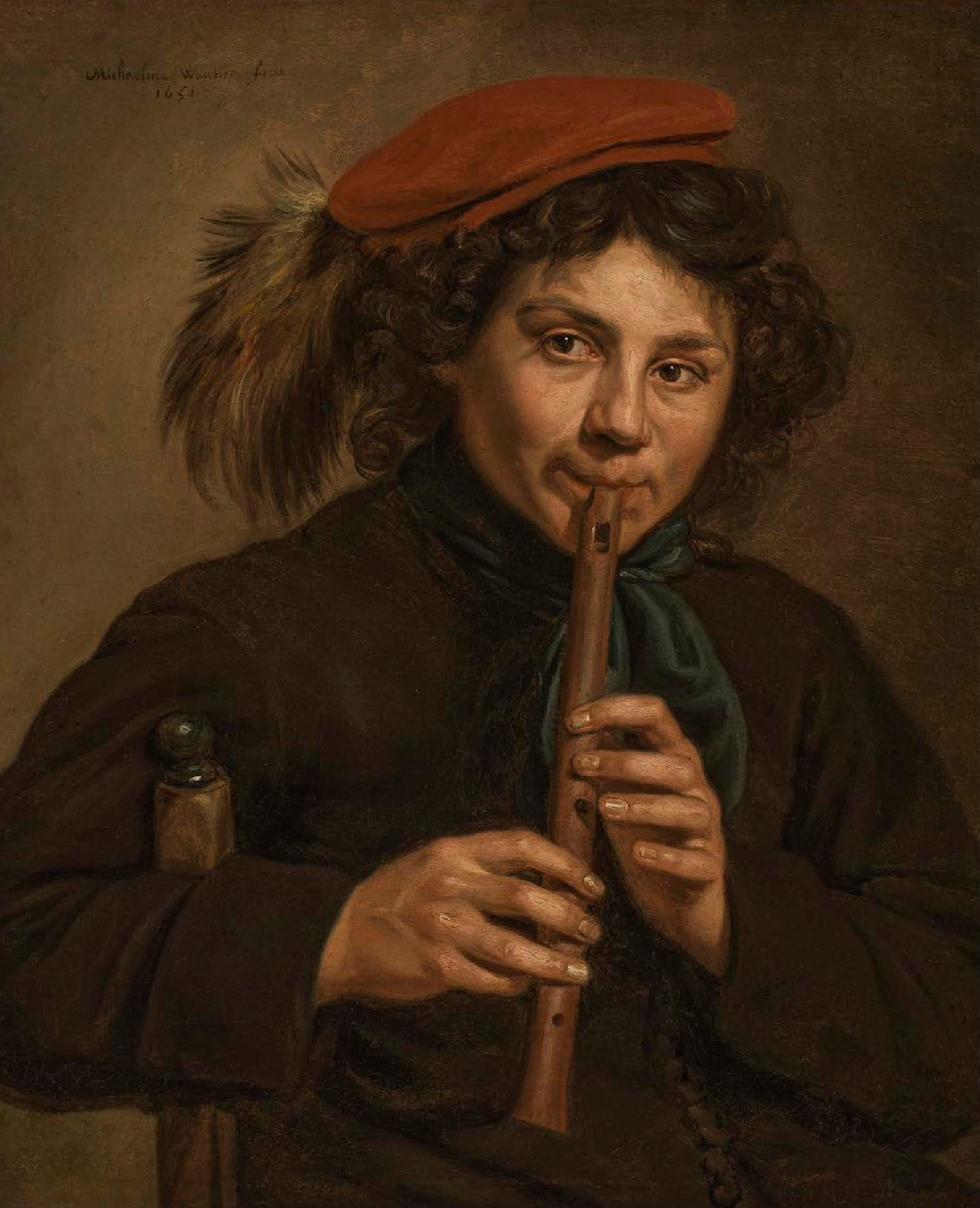
Hearing, Michaelina Wautier, 1650, Museum of Fine Arts, Boston, 69.5x61cm

Wautier depicts a boy in his early teens who is casually sitting on a chair, relaxed, and playing the recorder while he gazes off. The young boy is seen wearing a dark, loose-fitting shirt with a dark green knotted neckcloth. A red beret with a large gray feather hang to the side while he sits against a warm backdrop. The light source sits directly in front of the boy. Both the front of his hands and face absorb the light along with the recorder.

=== Smell ===
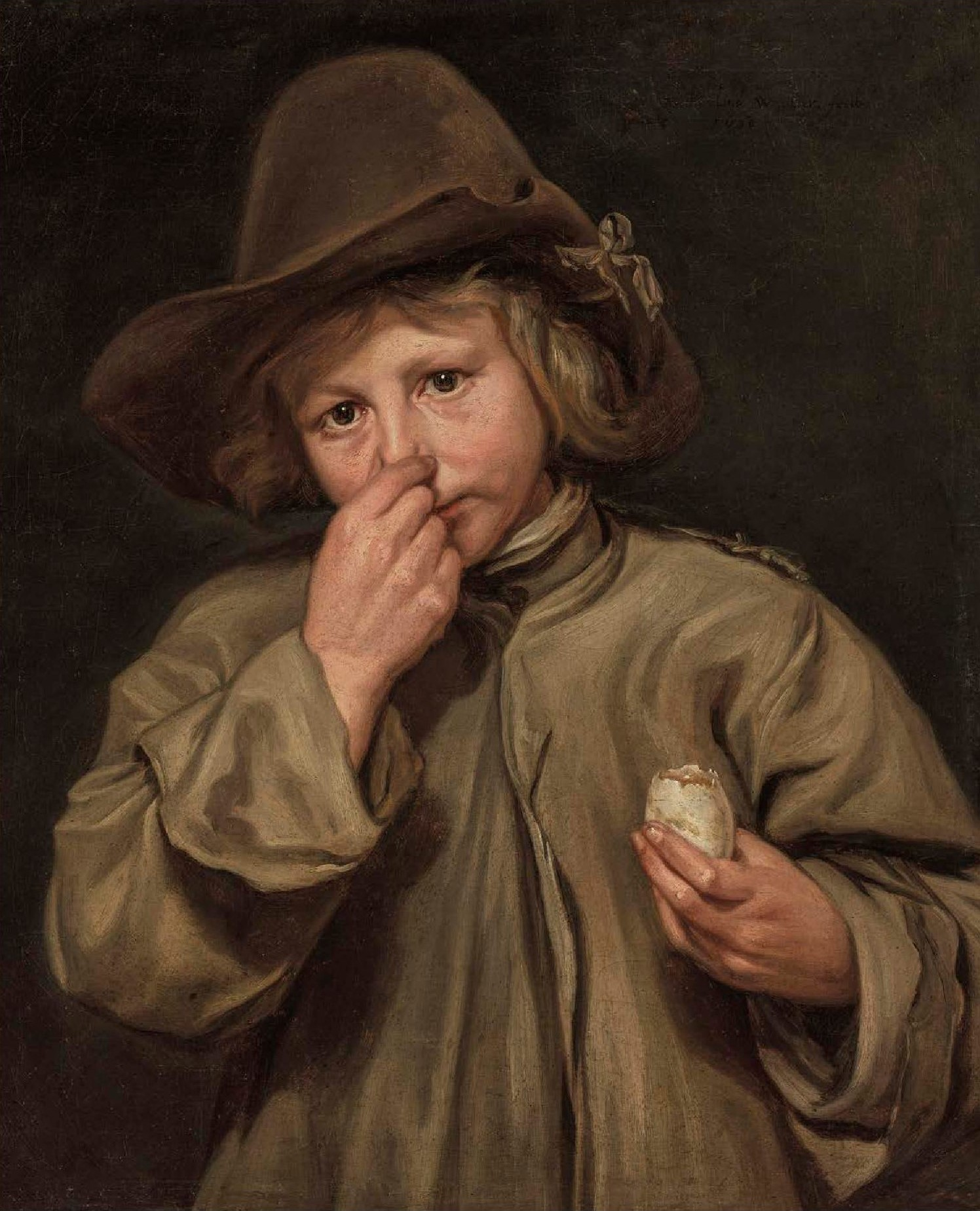
Smell, Michaelina Wautier, 1650, Museum of Fine Arts, Boston, 69.5x61cm

A painting of a young blond boy who is pinching his nose due to the awful smell of a rotten egg he is holding in his left hand. A slight frown dawns on his face as he looks out at the viewer with his dark eyes. The boy is seen wearing a tall, dark brown hat that is folded up on the side. He is also seen in a large, tan smock with the sleeves folded up. The light brightens the little boy's face, highlighting his negative reaction.

=== Taste ===
The painting shows a young boy with long red hair, lightly biting down on a piece of bread. A dark brown cloth hangs from his shoulders, he wears a black coat with a white, collared shirt underneath. Although the boy is placed in front of a gray background, he is outlined with a lighter color palette.

=== Touch ===
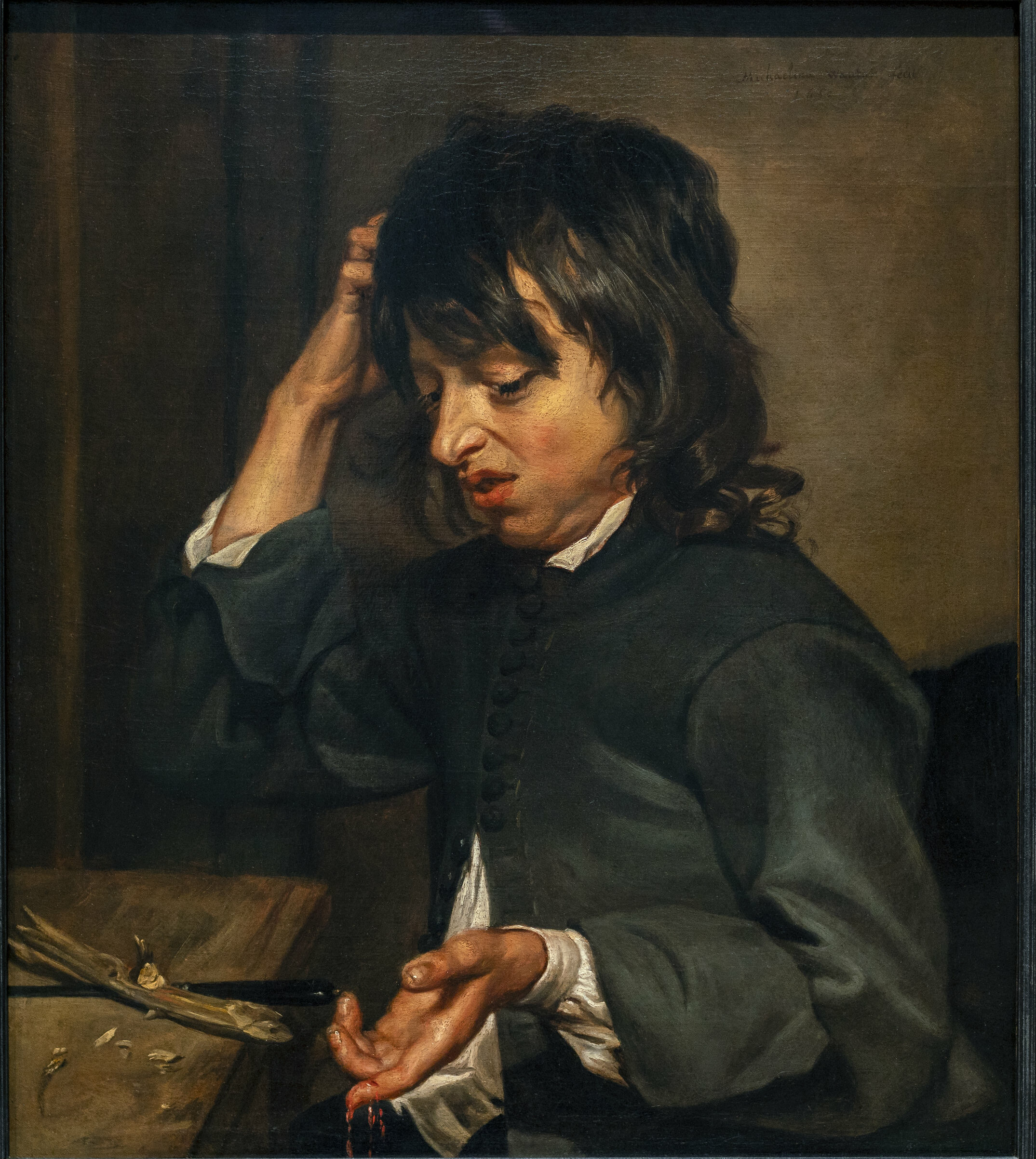
Touch, Michaelina Wautier, 1650, Museum of Fine Arts, Boston, 69.5x61cm

The painting is a representation of a young boy wearing a white shirt under a black jacket with buttoned sleeves. With his right hand, fingers scrunched, he scratches his head while looking down onto his left index finger. His index finger has a cut on it, letting the blood drip down. A sharpened stick laid next to a knife on the table indicated he had cut his finger while whittling. The expression is written all over his face; a scrunched up nose and parted lips showing a grimace.

== Painting methods ==
Wautier used a common method throughout the five paintings: constructing three-dimensional forms, using darkly lit backgrounds, and painting with short, thick strokes. Such paint strokes were done tightly and with care, and are only visible when inspected closely or in high definition photos.

Both Sight and Smell share a thick reddish-orange layer covered by a thinner warm-toned gray layer. It is highly likely that the other three paintings share the same qualities. In all five paintings, it appears that Wautier did not sketch on the canvas before beginning to paint. Considering how common it was for certain artists to sketch beforehand and with no evidence of underdrawing, it is safe to assume that Wautier did not use materials like charcoal to sketch out her paintings.

== See also ==
- List of paintings by Michaelina Wautier
