= Wautier =

Wautier is a surname. Notable people with the surname include:

- Michaelina Wautier (1604–1689), Flemish painter
- Violette Wautier (born 1993), Thai singer, songwriter, and actress
