= Blowing bubbles =

Blowing bubbles may refer to:

== Art ==
- Boy Blowing Bubbles, 1867 oil-on-canvas painting by Édouard Manet
- Two Boys Blowing Bubbles, 1640s painting by Michaelina Wautier
- "Blowing Bubbles", an episode of Northern Exposure television series

== See also ==
- "I'm Forever Blowing Bubbles", 1919 American song by Ben Selvin's Novelty Orchestra
- Soap bubble, use in recreation as blowing bubbles for over 400 years
