= Jacques Neutre =

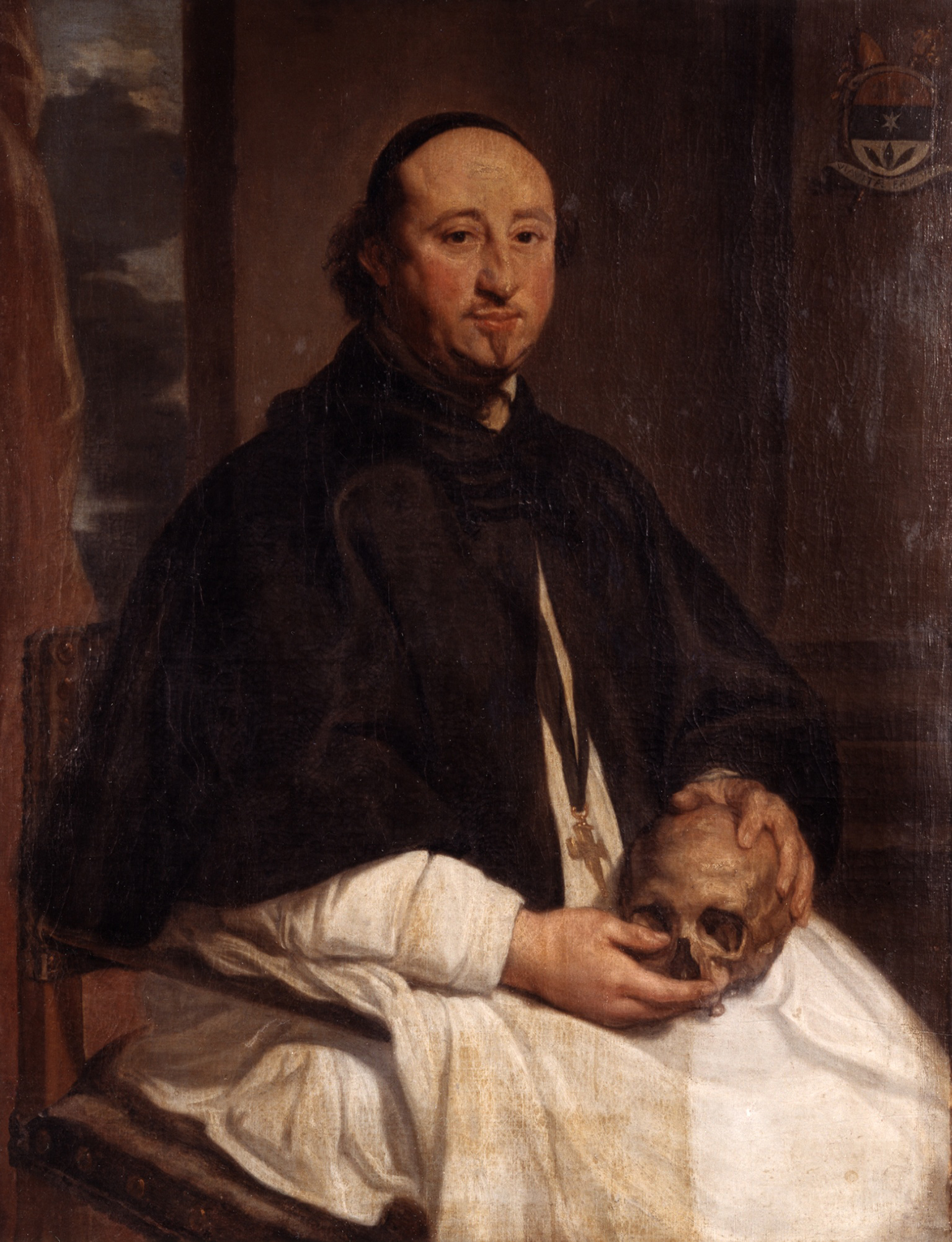
A portrait of Jacques Neutre by Charles Wautier, 1668

Jacques Neutre (1631—1679) was an abbot and diplomat from the County of Hainaut in the Spanish Netherlands.

== Life ==
Neutre was born in Mons on 8 March 1631, the son of François Neutre and Catherine Sohier. After studying theology, he entered the monastery of Val-des-Ecoliers in his native city. In 1659 he represented his community at a meeting of the order in Géronsart, afterwards becoming a coadjutor involved in the negotiations for a union of monasteries under the authority of the abbot general of Sainte-Geneviève. After the death of Abbot Nicolas de Souhait on 8 February 1663, Neutre was elected as his successor. One of his first actions as abbot was to have the aging monastic living quarters demolished and replaced with a new building. He commissioned paintings for the abbey church, and installed a carillon in the monastery's tower.

He was several times elected to represent the clergy (the 'First Estate') in the States of Hainaut. As such, he was involved in negotiating disputes between the County of Hainaut and the Kingdom of France arising as a result of the War of Devolution. He also litigated with the city of Mons and the Collegiate Church of St Waudru to enforce their respect for his order's privileges.

He died of apoplexy on 21 September 1679 and was buried in the choir of the abbey church.
