= Portrait of Martino Martini =

1654 painting by Michaelina Wautier

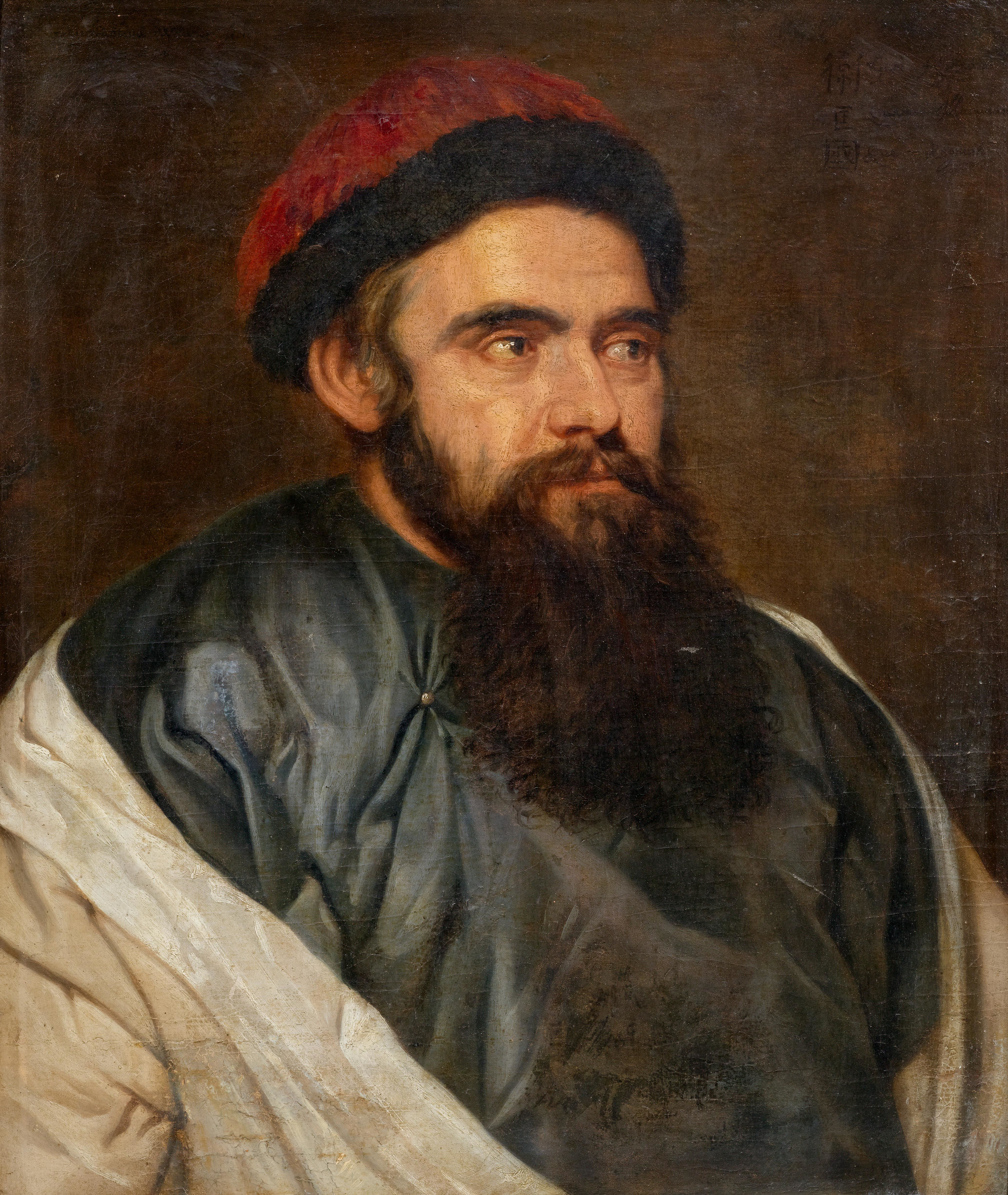
- Artist: Michaelina Wautier
- Year: 1654
- Medium: Oil on canvas
- Dimensions: 69.5 cm × 59 cm (27.4 in × 23 in)

Portrait of Martino Martini is a painting by the Walloon artist Michaelina Wautier. Painted in 1654, it shows the Jesuit missionary Martino Martini. The work hangs in the Klesch private collection.

== See also ==
- List of paintings by Michaelina Wautier
