= Jean Vivien =

Jean Vivien was a 15th-century monastic chronicler. Born in Mons, he joined the Augustinian house of Val-des-Ecoliers in the city, eventually becoming the monastery's procurator. He wrote a chronicle with particular detail about the life of the community in the years 1449—1465, when Paul Ghesquière was prior.
