= Two Girls as Saint Agnes and Saint Dorothea =

1650s painting by Michaelina Wautier

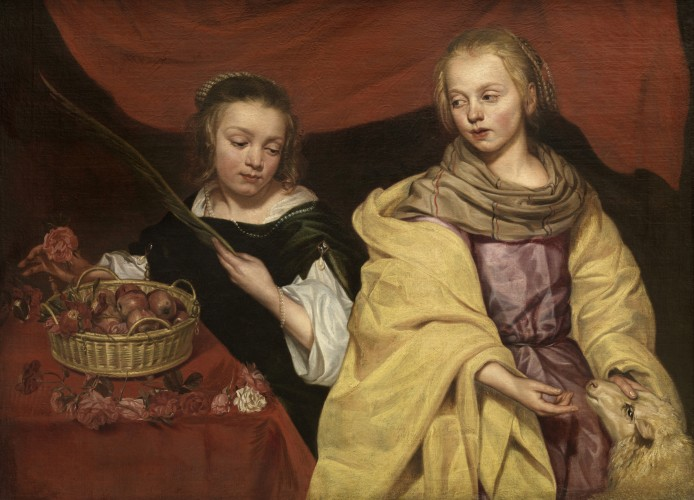
- Artist: Michaelina Wautier
- Location: Royal Museum of Fine Arts Antwerp

Two Girls as Saint Agnes and Saint Dorothea is a painting by the Walloon artist Michaelina Wautier. It was probably painted in the 1650s.

It now hangs in the Royal Museum of Fine Arts, Antwerp.

== See also ==
- List of paintings by Michaelina Wautier
