= Abbey of Val des Écoliers, Mons =

Coordinates: 50°27′03″N 3°56′29″E

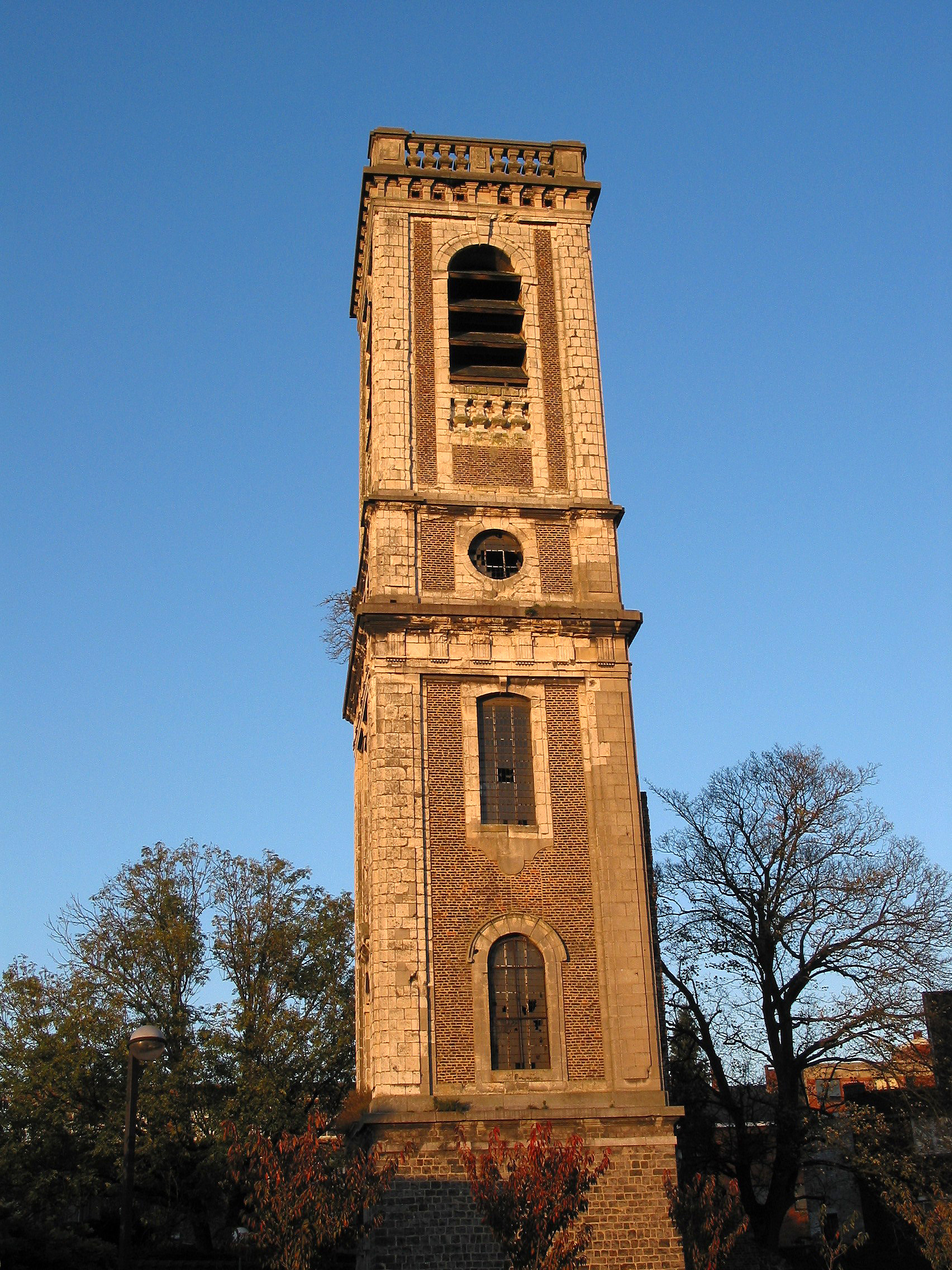
Val-des-Écoliers Tower: all that remains of the former monastery

Notre Dame du Val des Écoliers was a monastery of Augustinian canons regular in the city of Mons, Belgium, founded as a priory in 1252 at the invitation of Margaret, Countess of Hainaut. It became an abbey in 1617 and was suppressed in 1796, during the French period. The buildings were later used as an arsenal, a meeting hall, a warehouse, a factory, and a hospital, but were allowed to decay into considerable disrepair. Most of the old buildings were demolished in 1876, but one tower remained and was restored in 1892. It was classified as a monument in 1955 and is now a landmark. The monastic ruins were investigated by archaeologists in 2021 prior to being cleared to make way for an underground carpark and office space. Initially expected to last a month, the dig would ultimately run from March to July, and exhumed about sixty sets of human remains dating from the 14th and 15th centuries.

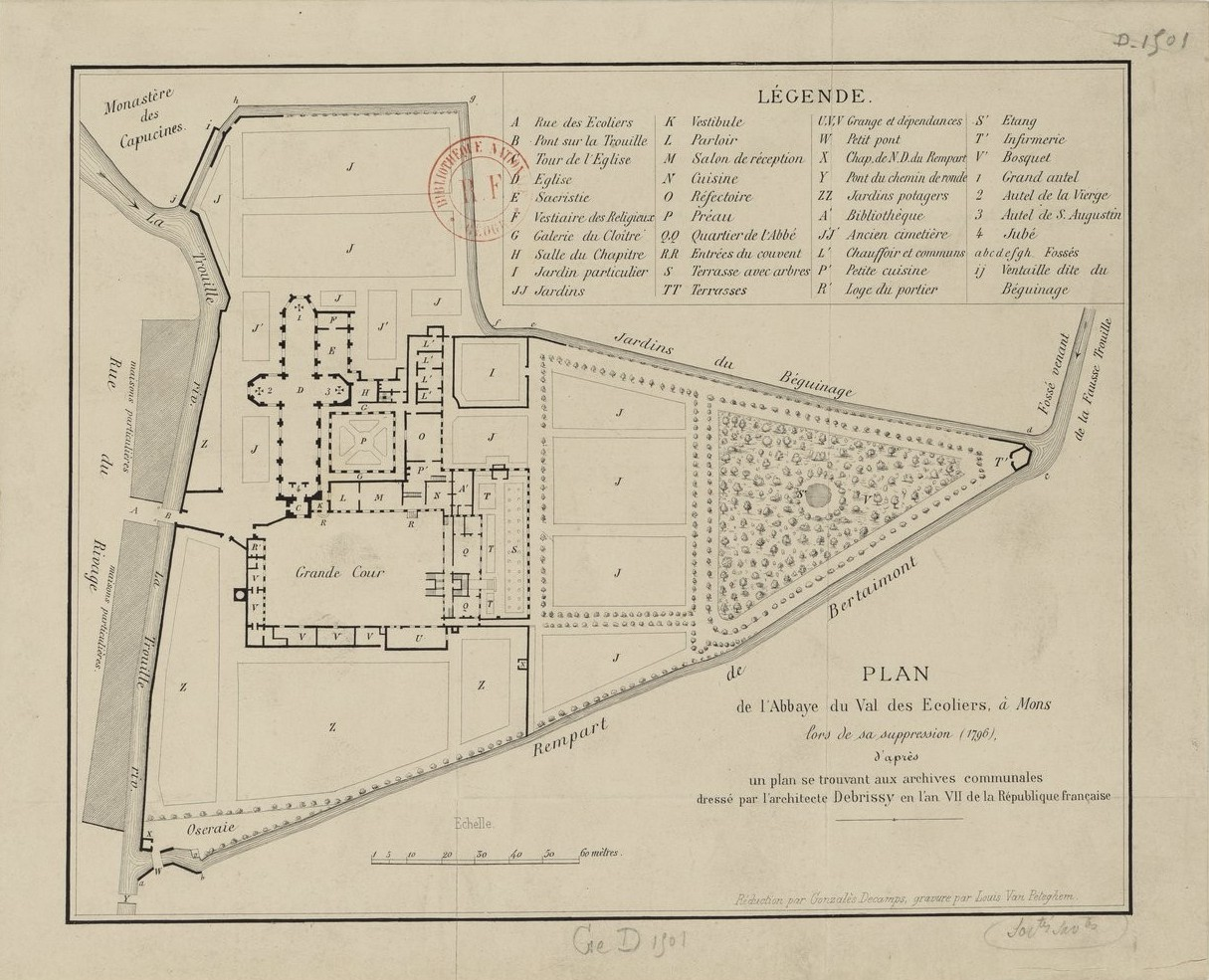
A plan of the monastery at the time of its suppression

== Notable members ==
- Jacques Neutre
- Jean Vivien
