= Katlijne Van der Stighelen =

Belgian art historian

- Born: 1959 (age 66–67)

Katlijne Van der Stighelen (born 1959) is a Belgian art historian.

She began writing about the history of women writers and artists, but also writes about individuals, writing about Anna Maria van Schurman and later about Michaelina Wautier. In 2018 she curated the first exhibition for Wautier and her younger brother Charles, after this enigmatic brother-sister pair had been forgotten for centuries. Thanks to modern art historical research, paintings could be re-attributed to both painters from the early 2000s onwards. One was recently purchased for the Flemish art collection called The Phoebus Foundation, thanks to her research.

== Works ==
- Anna Maria van Schurman (1607-1678) : 'die de wetenschap had met eenen diamant op het glas geestig te schrijven', 1985
- Embracing Brussels : art and culture in the court city, 1600-1800, 2013
- Family ties : art production and kinship patterns in the early modern Low Countries, 2012
- Nude and the norm in the early modern low countries, 2011
- Michaelina Wautier (1614-1689), 2018
