= Michaelina Wautier =

Dutch artist (1614–1689)

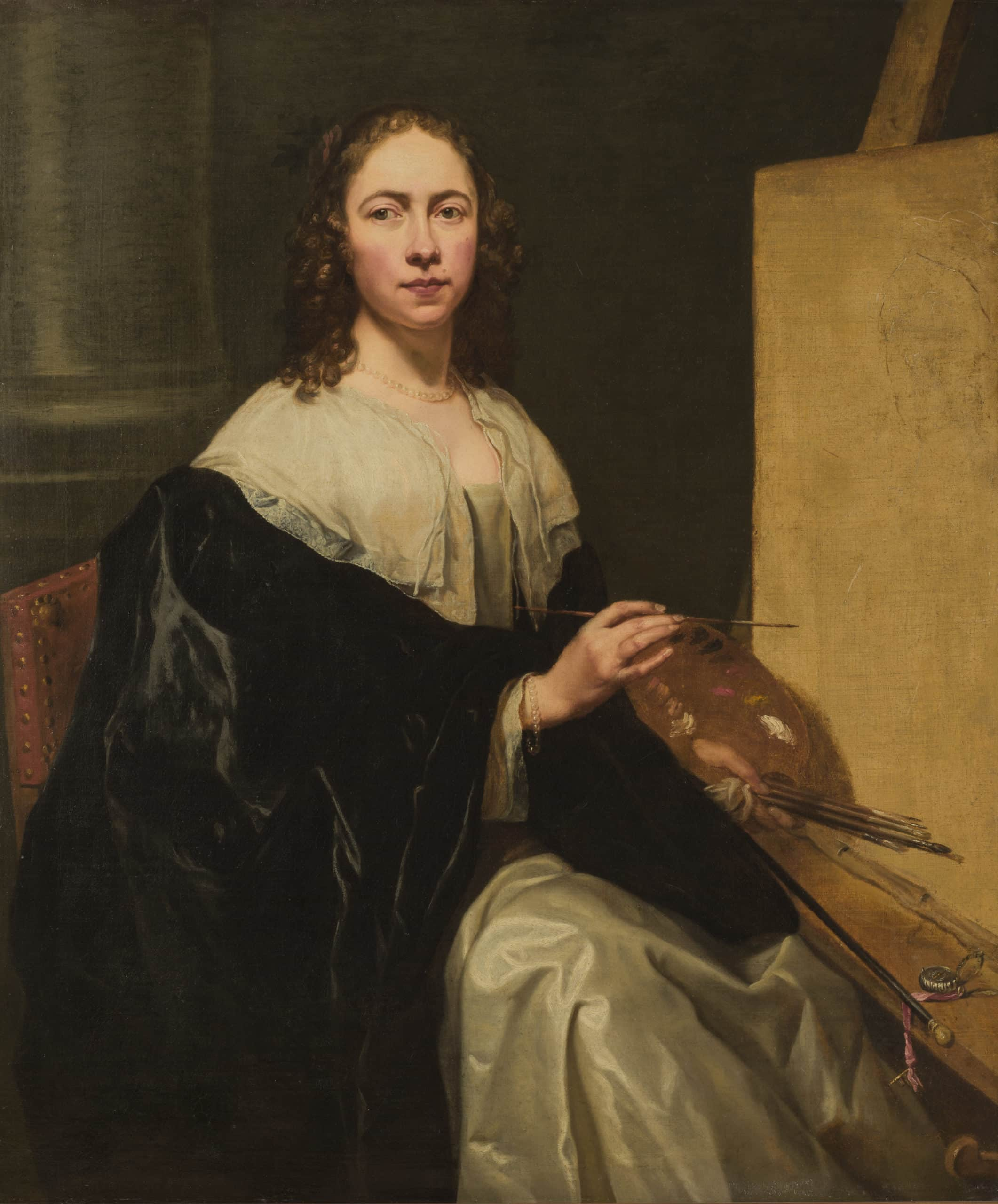
- Self-portrait, 1649
- Born: c. 1614; Mons, County of Hainaut, Habsburg Netherlands
- Died: 1689; Brussels, Duchy of Brabant, Habsburg Netherlands
- Notable work: The Triumph of Bacchus (1650)
- Movement: Flemish Baroque painting
- Family: Charles Wautier (brother)

Michaelina Wautier, also Woutiers (c. 1614 – 1689), was a painter from the Southern Netherlands, an outstanding female artist of Flemish Baroque painting. Only since the start of the 21st century have works been recognized as hers. Previously her works were attributed to male artists, especially her brother Charles. Much of the work of tracking and attributing her paintings has been done by the Belgian art historian Katlijne Van der Stighelen.

Wautier was noted for the variety of subjects and genres that she worked in. This was unusual for female artists of the time who were more often restricted to smaller paintings, generally portraits or still-lifes.

== Biography ==
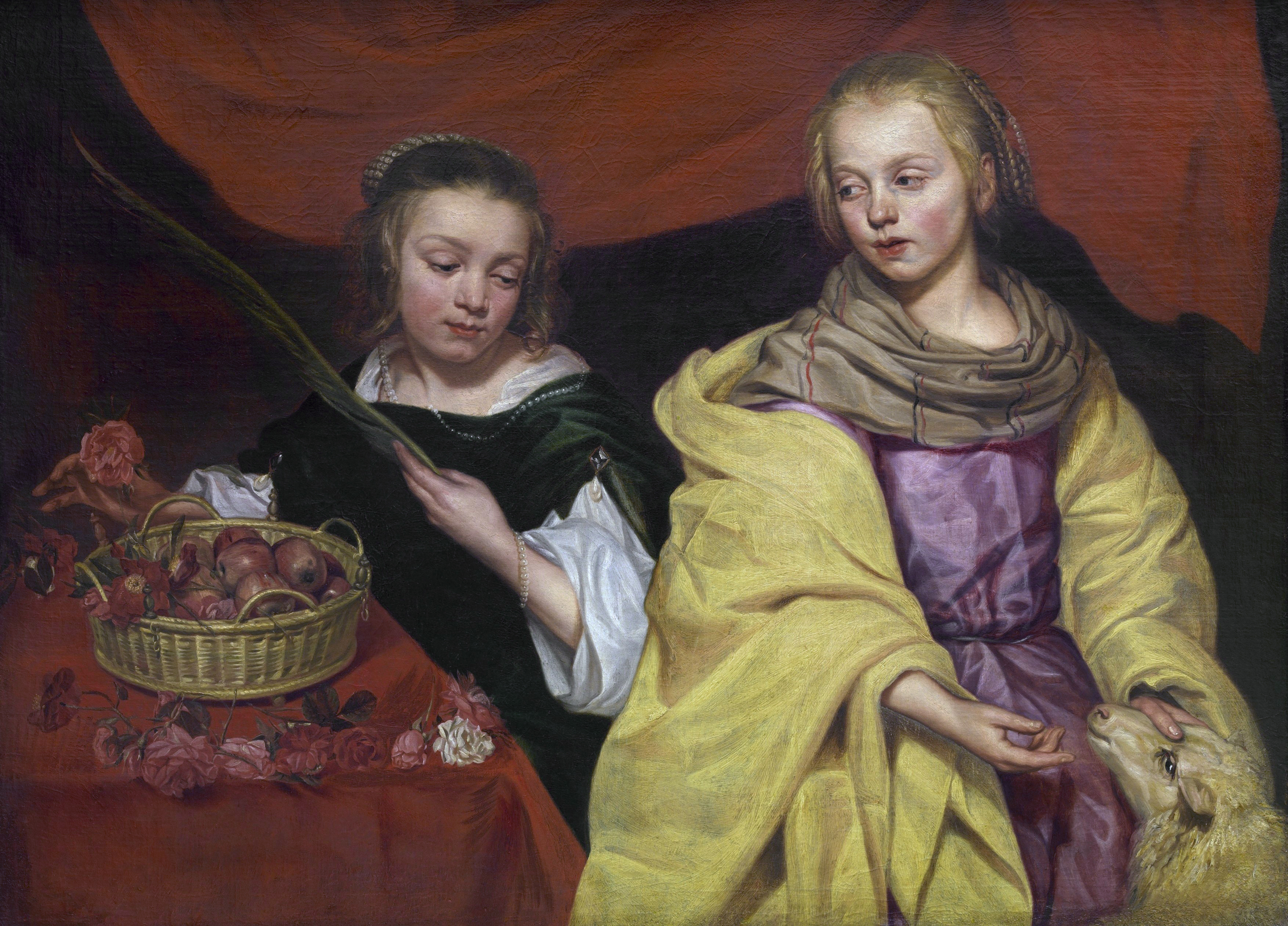
Two Girls as Saint Agnes and Saint Dorothea, Royal Museum of Fine Arts Antwerp.

Born in around 1614 in Mons, in the County of Hainaut, Michelle Wautier was one of two daughters in a family with nine children. "Michaelina" was the Latinate version of her name that she adopted as an artist. Scholars assume that she came from a wealthy family, as her work shows a deep knowledge of classical mythology and symbolism. She appears to have begun her artistic career around the age of 39. Her talent evidently did not long go unnoticed. Possibly as a result of her brother Charles’ contacts in the army, where he had been an officer, she was commissioned to do a portrait of the aristocratic general Andrea Cantelmo. The original painting has disappeared, but its existence is known through an engraving of it by Paulus Pontius. Charles was also a painter, and the two moved to the City of Brussels in 1645, where they both remained unmarried and shared a studio.

After arriving in Brussels, they lived in a house near the Chapel Church in the Marolles district. Both Michaelina and Charles seem to have been active in business, particularly in real estate. Both also were almost certainly well-trained in art, but it is not known where or with whom. Little else is known about Wautier's life, and much of her biographical information is based on scholarly conjecture and analysis of her available works.

== Works ==
Michaelina Wautier painted in small formats as well as more ambitious canvases with as main subjects history, religion and mythology. At the time, large format paintings were still considered a preserve of male painters. Wautier multiplied representations of genre scenes, historical paintings, as well as more detailed representations of flower garlands. Her works also include a series of portraits. She was distinguished from other painters by the diversity of her subjects and formats.

Her first self-portrait, painted in 1649, was long mistakenly associated with the Italian painter Artemisia Gentileschi. It remains one of Wautier's most famous paintings. The painting is attributed to Gentileschi in Walter Shaw Sparrow's 1905 book Women Painters of the World. It was not until 1672 that the painter Elisabeth-Sophie Chéron produced what is considered the first female self-portrait in France.

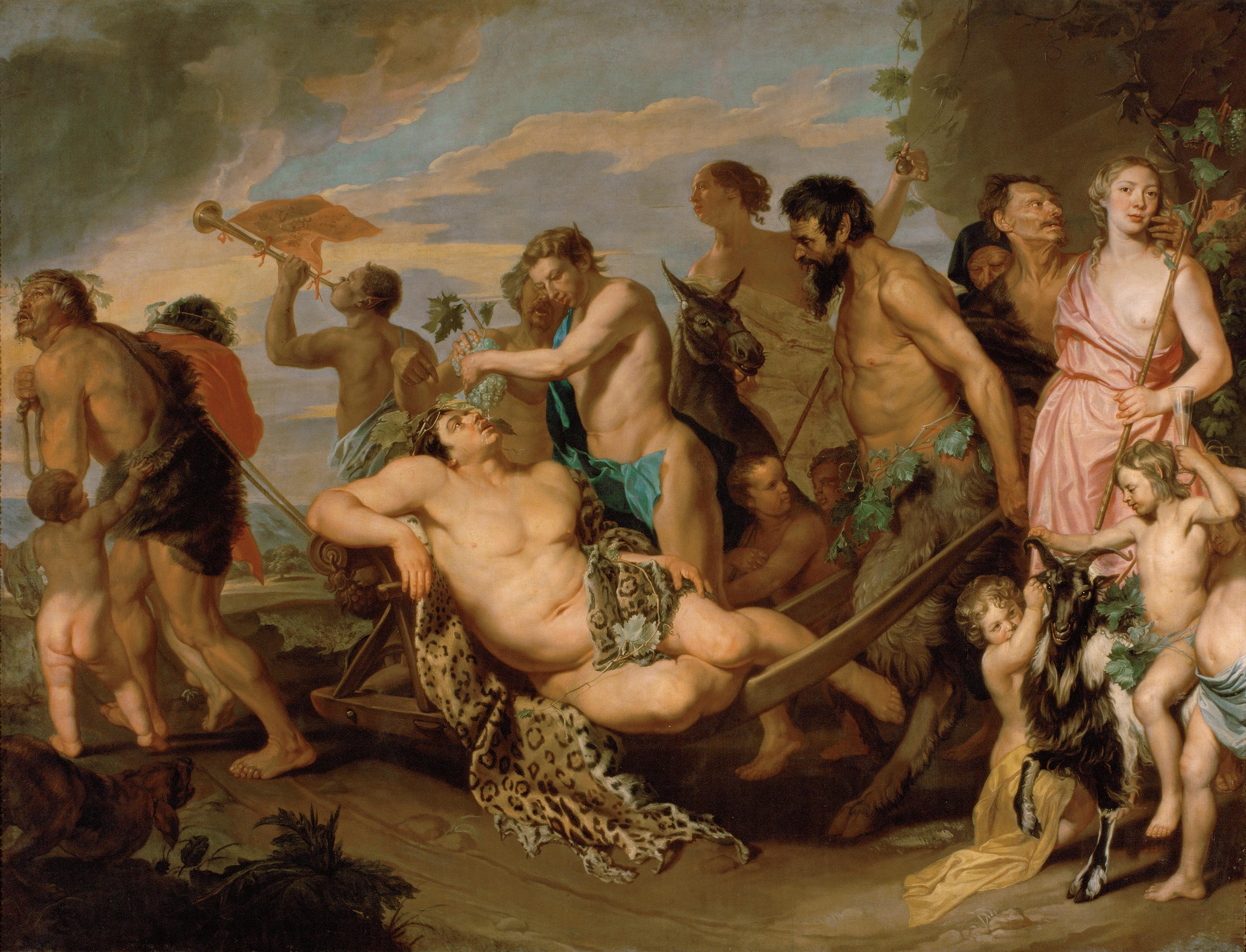
The Triumph of Bacchus (1650), Kunsthistorisches Museum, Vienna

The painting named The Triumph of Bacchus (1650, Kunsthistorisches Museum in Vienna) is often cited as one of the most representative of her works. It was originally held in the collection of the Archduke Leopold Wilhelm of Austria. Michaelina was familiar with masculine anatomy and painted it without shame, becoming one of the first female painters to expose a naked man. The artist depicted herself in the colourful crowd; she is the only character to look at the viewer. Further, the large scale of the painting was notable for a female artist of the time for, as McCouat says, "women were patronisingly regarded as not being capable of such large-scale complex works".

Unlike many other women painters of this period, Wautier received recognition while alive. In particular, she sold four paintings to Archduke Leopold Wilhelm of Austria for his painting gallery. The paintings are mentioned in the inventory of the collection drawn up in 1659. However, her work fell into oblivion after her death. Some art historians link this absence to the attribution of her paintings to Thomas Willeboirts Bosschaert, Jacob van Oost or her brother Charles Wautier. Additionally, art scholar Katlijne van der Stighelen notes that there was a long period between her last painting (believed to be in 1659) and her death in 1689, at the age of around 75, during which she was not producing paintings or staying in the public eye. Further, unlike some of her female contemporaries, including the Italians Gentileschi and Elisabetta Sirani, her self-portrait was never issued as a print to perpetuate her memory. In fact, eventually that self-portrait itself was later attributed to Gentileschi.

== Legacy ==
After Wautier's death in 1689, her legacy was quickly lost due to the various reasons: mis-attribution, confusion with other noted female artists of the period, and inability to differentiate her work from that of her brother Charles. Two centuries later, starting in the 1850s, recognition of her work began to pick up again. However, any mention of her was usually limited to a characterization of her as a "skilled portraitist" with few attributed works.

Her reputation enjoyed a revival starting in the 1960s with the sudden appearance of her floral still life Garland with a Butterfly in an exhibition, which later disappeared in 1985, along with her official recognition as the rightful creator of The Triumph of Bacchus in 1967. The art historian, intellectual, and feminist Germaine Greer gave Wautier coverage in her book The Obstacle Race: The Fortunes of Women Painters and Their Work (1979). Commenting on her work Portrait of a Commander in the Spanish Army, Greer said that Wautier displayed "swiftness and accuracy" indicating extensive professional practice. Additional re-attributions as well as exhibitions that included her paintings made the art-going public more aware of her legacy. The greater interest in her work culminated in her first dedicated exhibition in 2018.

== Paintings ==
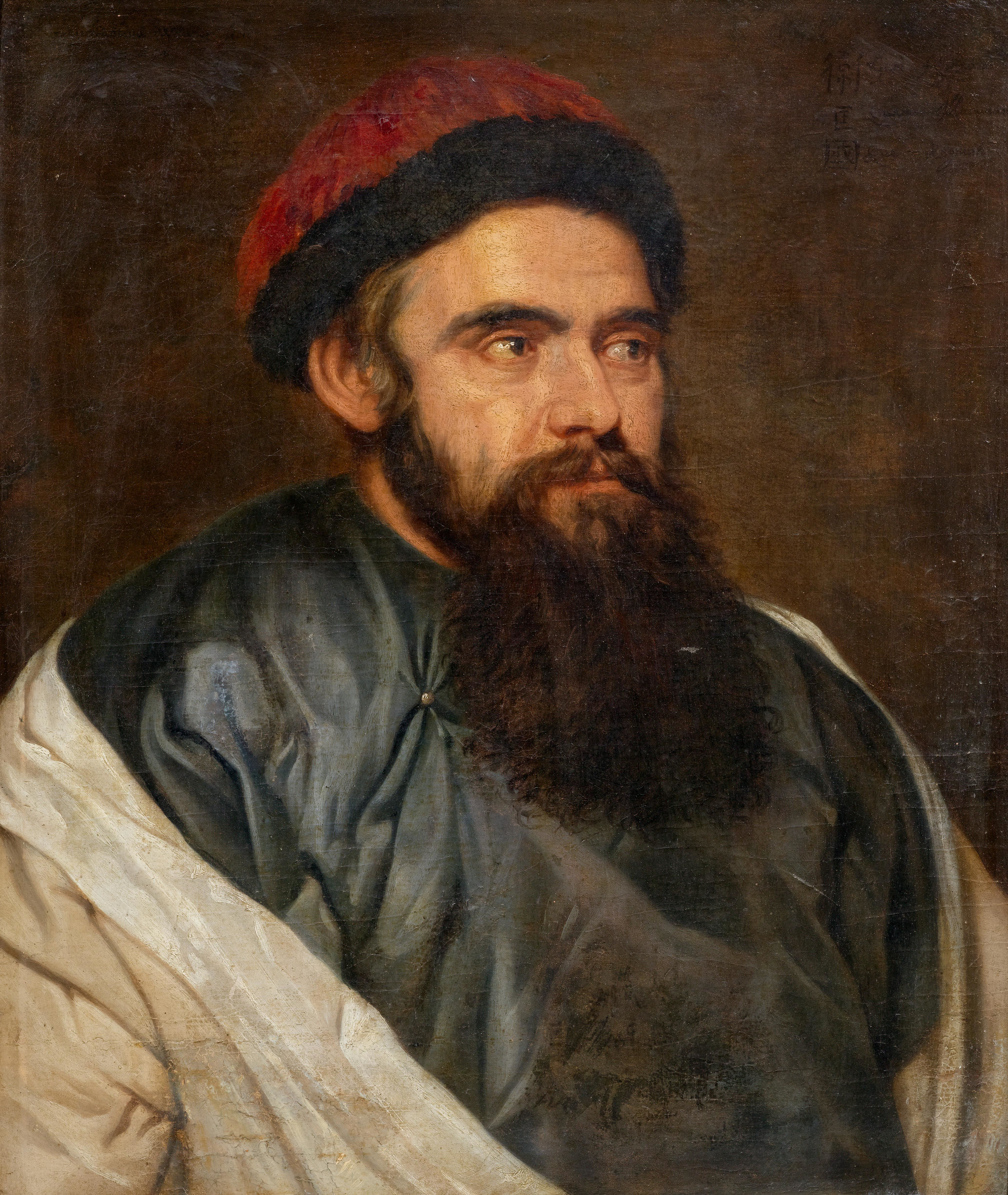
Portrait of Martino Martini (1654), Private collection

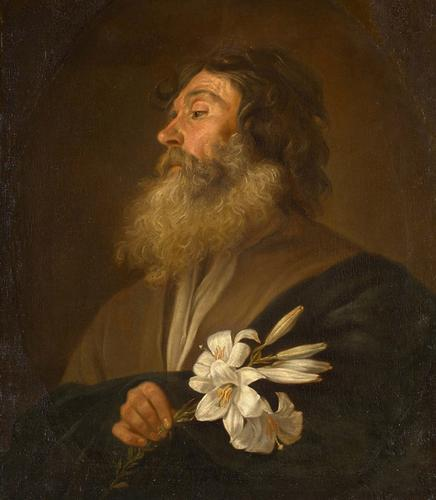
St Joseph holding white lilies (1650), Kunsthistorisches Museum, Vienna.

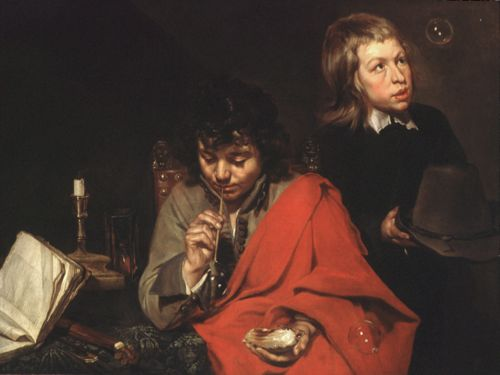
Two Boys Blowing Bubbles (between 1640 and 1650), Seattle Art Museum, Seattle.

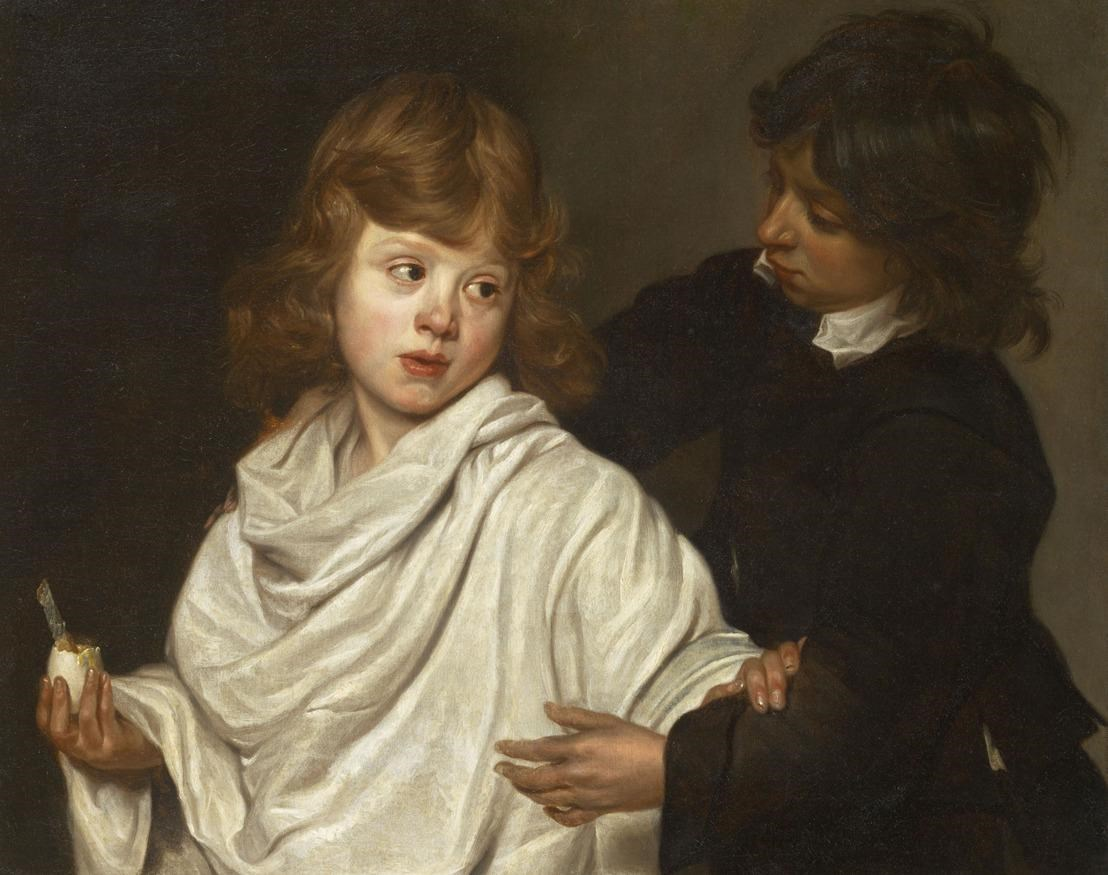
Elk zijn meug, The Phoebus Foundation

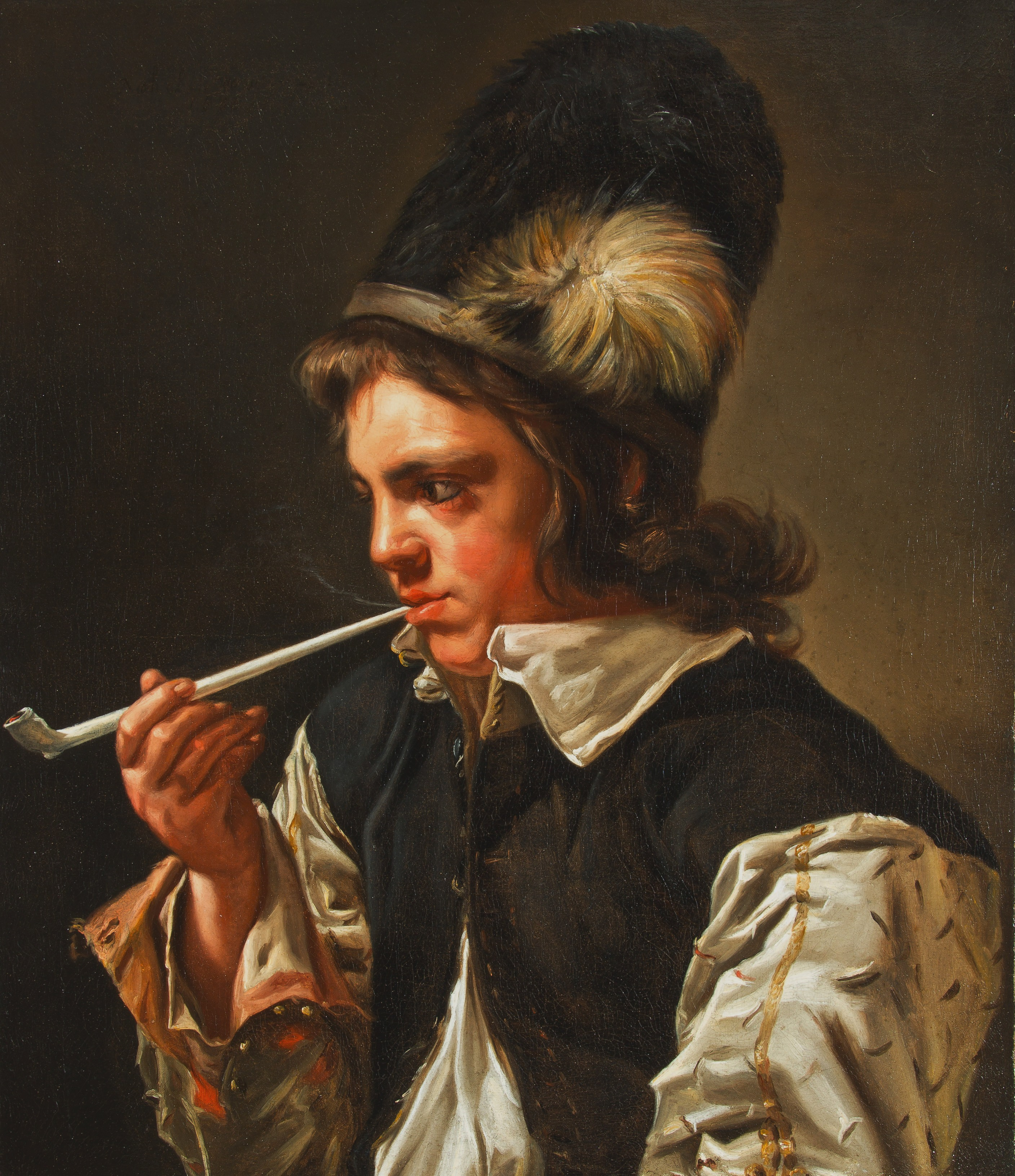
A youth smoking a pipe (circa 1659), Private collection

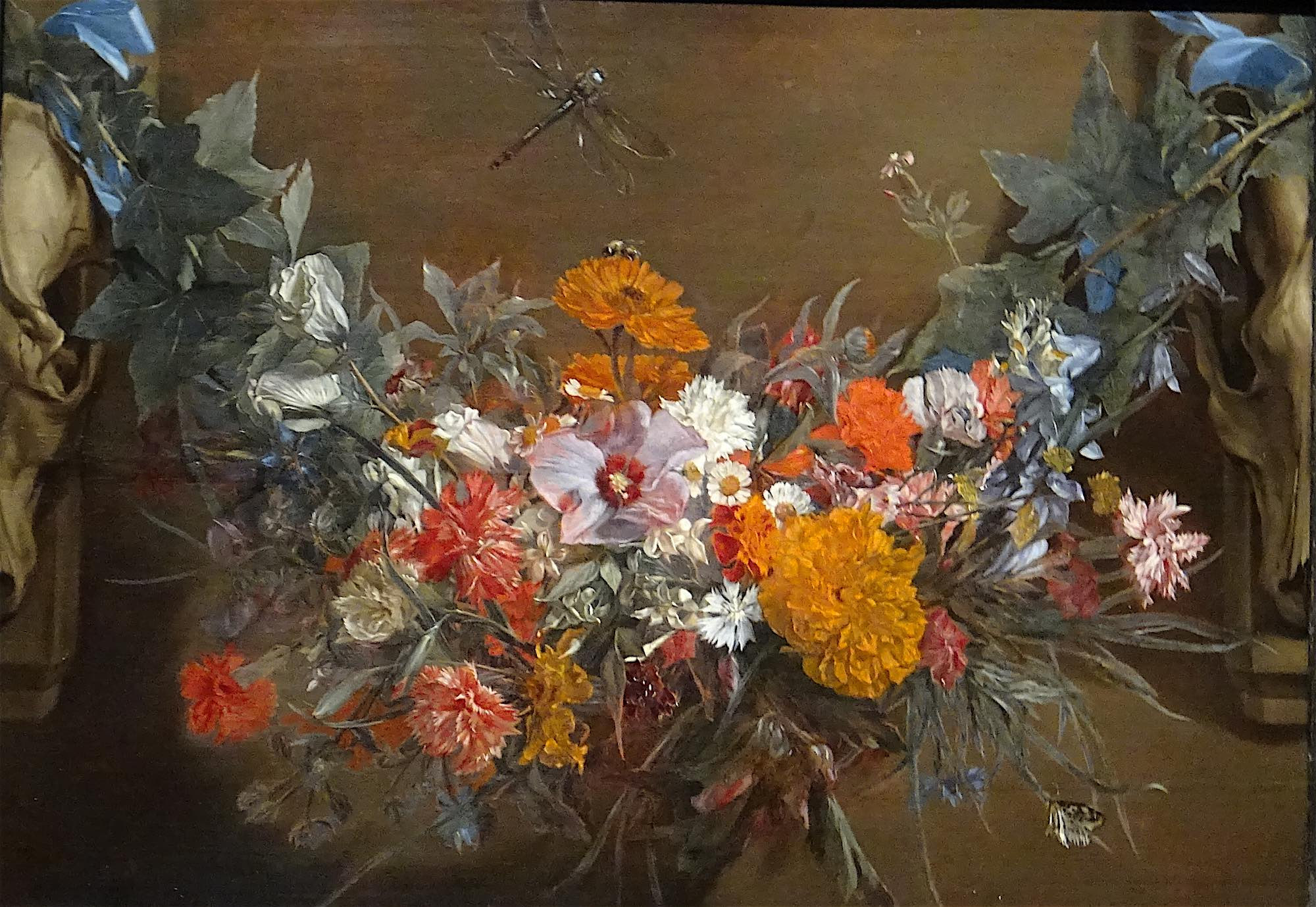
Flower garland with dragonfly, Private collection

== Retrospective ==
From June to September 2018, the first complete retrospective on Michaelina Wautier was shown at the Museum aan de Stroom in Antwerp (MAS) (which organised the exhibition along with the Rubenshuis). It was curated by the art historian Katlijne Van der Stighelen. Another retrospective, Michaelina Wautier, Painter, was organized by the Kunsthistorisches Museum, Vienna, in cooperation with the Royal Academy of Arts, London. The exhibition was displayed at the Kunsthistorisches Museum 30 September 2025 – 22 February 2026 and at the Royal Academy of Arts 27 March – 21 June 2026. A catalog accompanied the exhibit ISBN 978-1915815200.

== See also ==
- The Five Senses (Wautier)
