= Ben van Beneden =

Belgian art authority

Ben van Beneden is the former director of the Rubenshuis (Rubens House), the former home and studio of Peter Paul Rubens in Antwerp, Belgium, and an authority on the art of Rubens. He retired on 1 September 2021.

== Selected publications ==
- Room for art in Seventeenth-century Antwerp. 2009. (With Ariane van Suchtelen) ISBN 9789040076558
- Rubens maverick artist: The master's theoretical notebook, The Rubenianum Quarterly Antwerp, 2013.
- Anthony van Dyck in Genoa, "The Rubenianum Quarterly", Vol. 2014, No. 4.
- Ben van Beneden, Amy Orrock: Rubens & Women. Dulwich Picture Gallery, 2023.
- Thomas Leysen and Ben Van Beneden: Rare and Indispensable: 100 Masterpieces from Flemish Collections. Antwerpen 2023
