= Two Boys Blowing Bubbles =

Painting by Michaelina Wautier

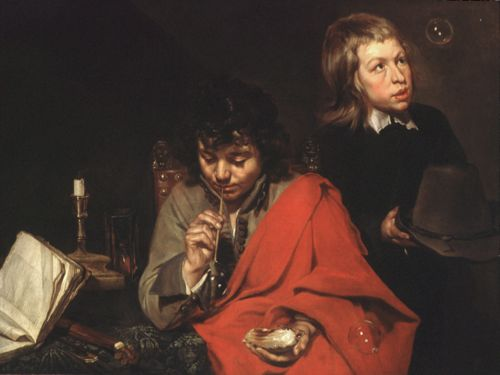
- Artist: Michaelina Wautier
- Year: 1640s
- Medium: Oil on canvas
- Dimensions: 90.5 cm × 121.3 cm (35.6 in × 47.8 in)

Two Boys Blowing Bubbles is a painting by the seventeenth-century Walloon artist Michaelina Wautier. It has been suggested that the painting is a double portrait, given the specific facial expressions and costumes of the two boys depicted are so distinctive. Besides the two boys, the painting depicts a candle and a sandtimer. As with the bubble, both are symbolic of the passing of time, and were familiar motifs in seventeenth-century painting.

The painting was previously attributed to Jacob van Oost. However, research done in 2007 led to the re-attribution to Wautier.

The painting hangs in the Seattle Art Museum who purchased it in 1958. A second version by Wautier is in a private collection in Spain. A third painting, executed in the eighteenth century and copying just the boy on the right, is in the Collection des Musee d'Amiens, France.

== See also ==
- List of paintings by Michaelina Wautier
