= Triumph of Bacchus (Wautier) =

1650s painting by Michaelina Wautier

The Triumph of Bacchus
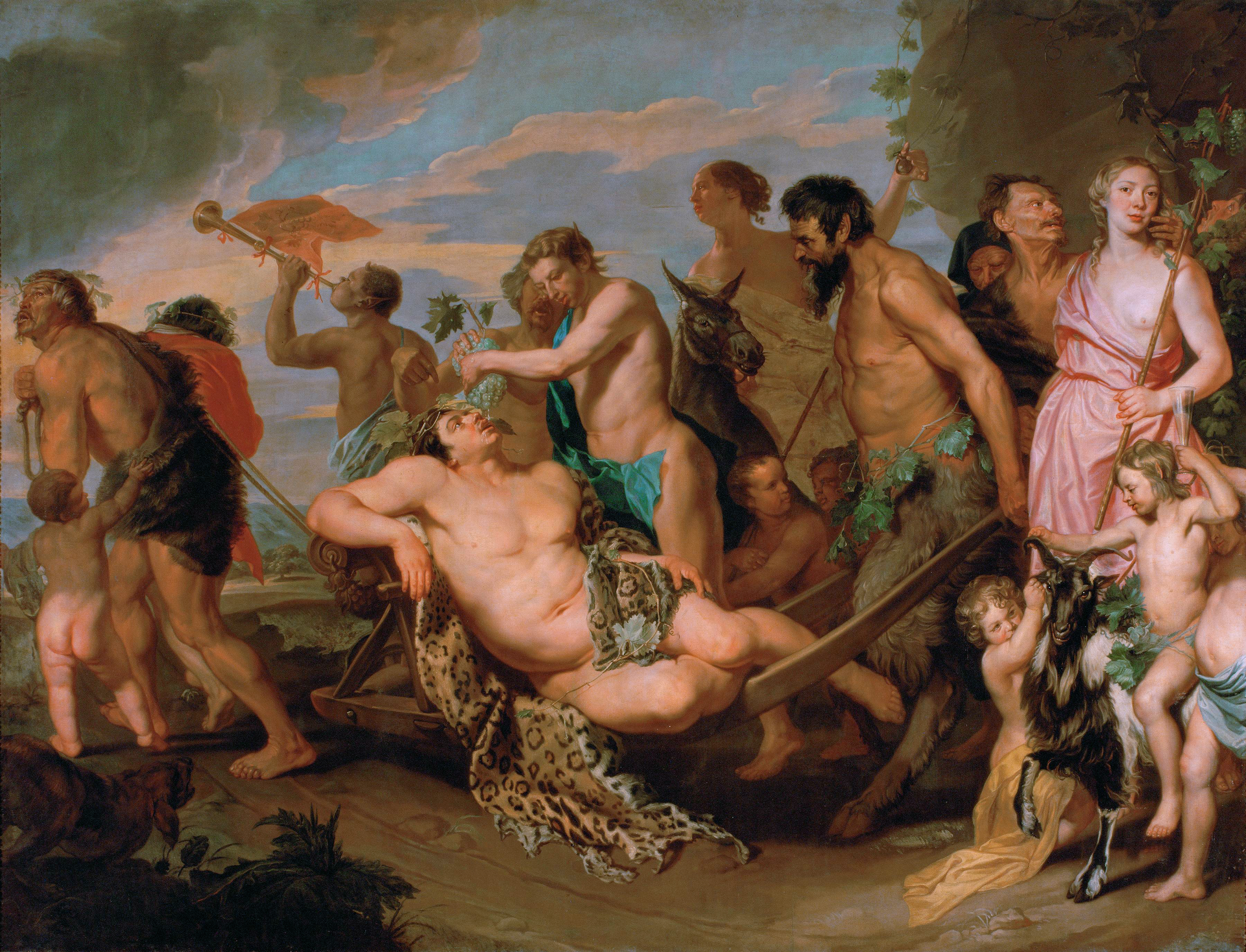
- Artist: Michaelina Wautier
- Year: 1650–1656
- Medium: Oil on canvas
- Dimensions: 270 cm × 354 cm (110 in × 139 in)
- Location: Kunsthistorisches Museum, Vienna

The Triumph of Bacchus is a painting by the Walloon artist Michaelina Wautier. It was painted between 1650 and 1656 and is one of Wautier's greatest works, as well as her largest. Based on classical texts, the picture shows a procession with the drunken god Bacchus at its centre, surrounded by other humans, satyrs, and animals. It is notable for its large number of nude male figures, something uncommon from a woman artist in this period.

It was possibly commissioned to be part of the large collection of art amassed by Archduke Leopold Willhelm; in any case by 1659 it was noted in an inventory of the collection.

It now hangs in the Kunsthistorisches Museum, Vienna.

== Subject matter ==
=== Description ===
The painting depicts the drunken Bacchus (Dionysus in Greek myth), reclined on a wheelbarrow and surrounded by revelers. His wheelbarrow is being pushed by a grizzled satyr, and a man is pouring juice into Bacchus's open mouth. The presence of the donkey just behind him indicates that this man may be Bacchus' friend and teacher, Silenus, but it is not confirmed.

On the far right is a self-portrait of the artist, notably the only figure looking directly out at the viewer. Unlike the other figures, she appears somewhat detached from the excitement and is paying no attention to the man trying to touch her. At her feet are two children playing with a goat.

Because Bacchanal scenes typically feature the god surrounded by his female followers, the originality of Wautier's composition indicates that if Leopold Wilhelm did commission this painting from her, it was likely with minimal instruction.

=== Nudity ===
This painting diverts somewhat significantly from other depictions of the same subject. Bacchus is more typically painted in a wagon pulled by large cats, as in Cornelis de Vos' Triumph of Bacchus, but Wautier has foregone this imagery entirely with the exception of the leopard skin draped over the god's lap. Bacchus is also more typically shown surrounded by Bacchantes (Maenads to the Greek Dionysus), his female followers, yet Wautier has instead emphasized the nude male body in her composition. Because women at the time were not believed to be able to paint the male body accurately due to the fact that they were not permitted to study the male nude, it is suggested that this choice is a direct commentary on the matter. The ongoing debate over whether or not women should be permitted to paint nude models was in many ways irrelevant to Wautier; she was raised with eight brothers and, with most of them being younger than she was, was familiar enough with the nude male form that there was little to no impediment to her painting the male form.

At the center of the painting is Bacchus' covered groin, giving the composition a more sexual overtone. The goat is also typically considered a symbol of lust and loss of innocence.

== Background ==
=== Artist ===
Wautier was in her late 40s or early 50s at the time she painted The Triumph of Bacchus, and was living in Brussels, where she was well known at court. She is likely to have moved to Brussels from Mons after her mother's death, following three of her brothers who had moved to Brussels previously. She lived with her brother Charles, also an established artist at court in Brussels, until she died in 1689.

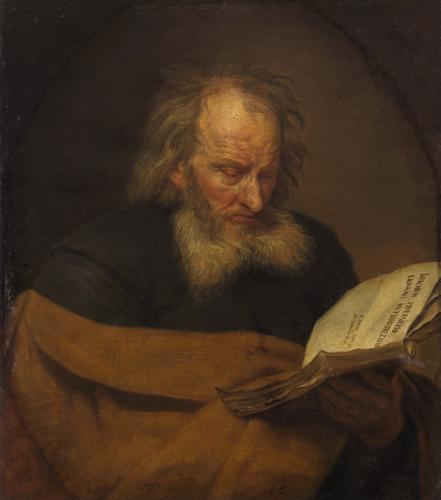
Saint Joachim Reading a Book, (c. 1650), by Michaelina Wautier

=== Archduke Leopold Wilhelm's collection ===
The archduke's collection was largely secular works, but not exclusively, and Wautier's Triumph of Bacchus was not the only Bacchus painting in the archduke's collection. It included Maerten van Heemskerck's Bacchus' Triumphant Return from India, Frans Wouters' Bacchus Procession, and another Bacchus procession by Jan Thomas, which is dated 1656—around the same time as Wautier's Bacchus.

His collection included three other paintings attributed to Michaelina Wautier: Saint Joachim Reading a Book, Saint Joseph, and another Saint Joachim.

== Attribution ==
There has been some degree of confusion regarding Michaelina Wautier's name and the works it is attached to. Baptism records from September 2, 1604, mark the birth of a 'Maria Magdalena Watier,' In the 1659 inventory of Leopold Wilhelm's collection, The Triumph of Bacchus was attributed to a von N. Woutiers. Three other paintings, Saint Joachim, Saint Joseph, and Saint Joachim Reading a Book, were each attributed in the inventory to a Magdalena Woutiers despite the fact that Saint Joachim has the name Michelline Wovteers written on the back. This suggests that by 1659, the names Michelline/Michaelina and Magdalena were at least somewhat interchangeable. A historian by the name of F. V. Goethels argued in the nineteenth century that these—Madeline and Michelle, as he spelled them—were two separate women who must have been sisters, but careful research into the sources of these paintings show that they can only be attributed to a single person, whether she is called Magdalena or Michaelina.

In 1967 Günther Heinz, a curator at the Kunsthistorisches Museum, confirmed via handwriting that this painting could not belong to anyone but Michaelina Wautier, as it had clearly been done by the same hand as the other three paintings attributed to her in the same collection.

== See also ==
- List of paintings by Michaelina Wautier
