= Flower Garland with Butterfly =

1650s painting by Michaelina Wautier

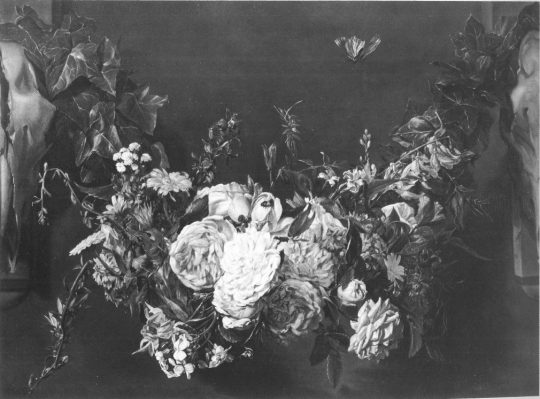
- Year: 1652
- Collection: Galerie Pardo

Flower Garland with Butterfly is a lost painting by the Flemish artist Michaelina Wautier. It is suspected that the painting is a pendant of a similar still life, Flower Garland with Dragonfly. Both pictures have skulls at either side, follow a similar arrangement of the flowers, and were both painted in 1652.

== See also ==
- List of paintings by Michaelina Wautier
