= Portrait of a Military Commander, possibly Pierre Wautier =

c. 1650 painting by Michaelina Wautier

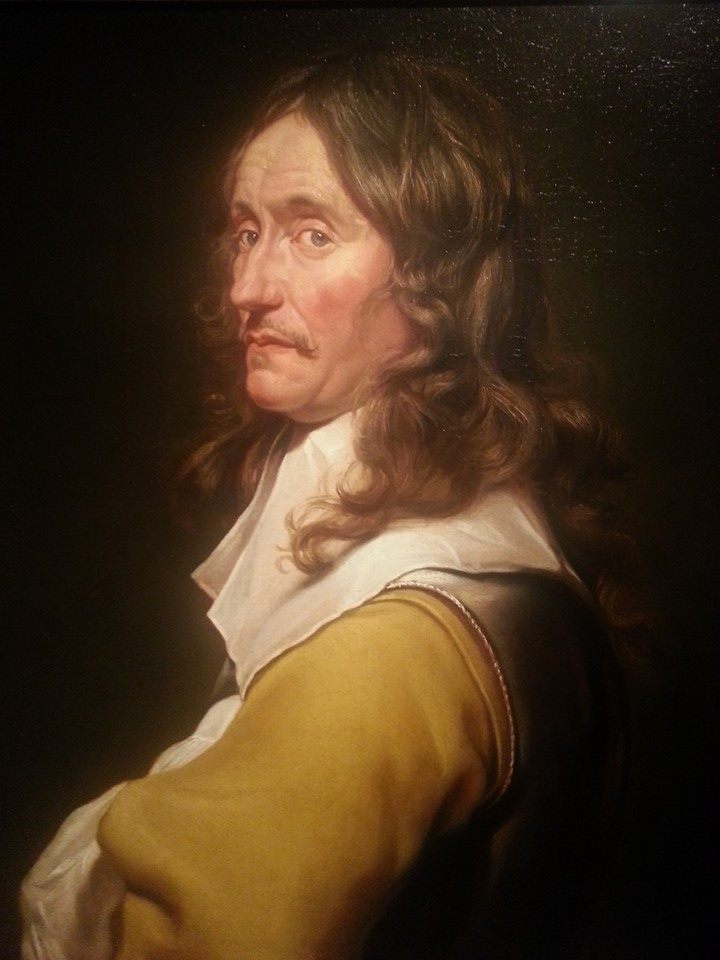
- Year: c. 1650
- Medium: oil paint, canvas
- Dimensions: 73 cm (29 in) × 58.5 cm (23.0 in)

The Portrait of a Military Commander is a painting by the Flemish artist Michaelina Wautier. The presence of the Wautier coat of arms on the painting has led some art historians to suggest that it depicts the artist's younger brother Pierre Wautier. It was painted some time in the 1650s, and is in a private collection.

== See also ==
- List of paintings by Michaelina Wautier
