= Self-portrait with Easel =

1640s painting by Michaelina Wautier

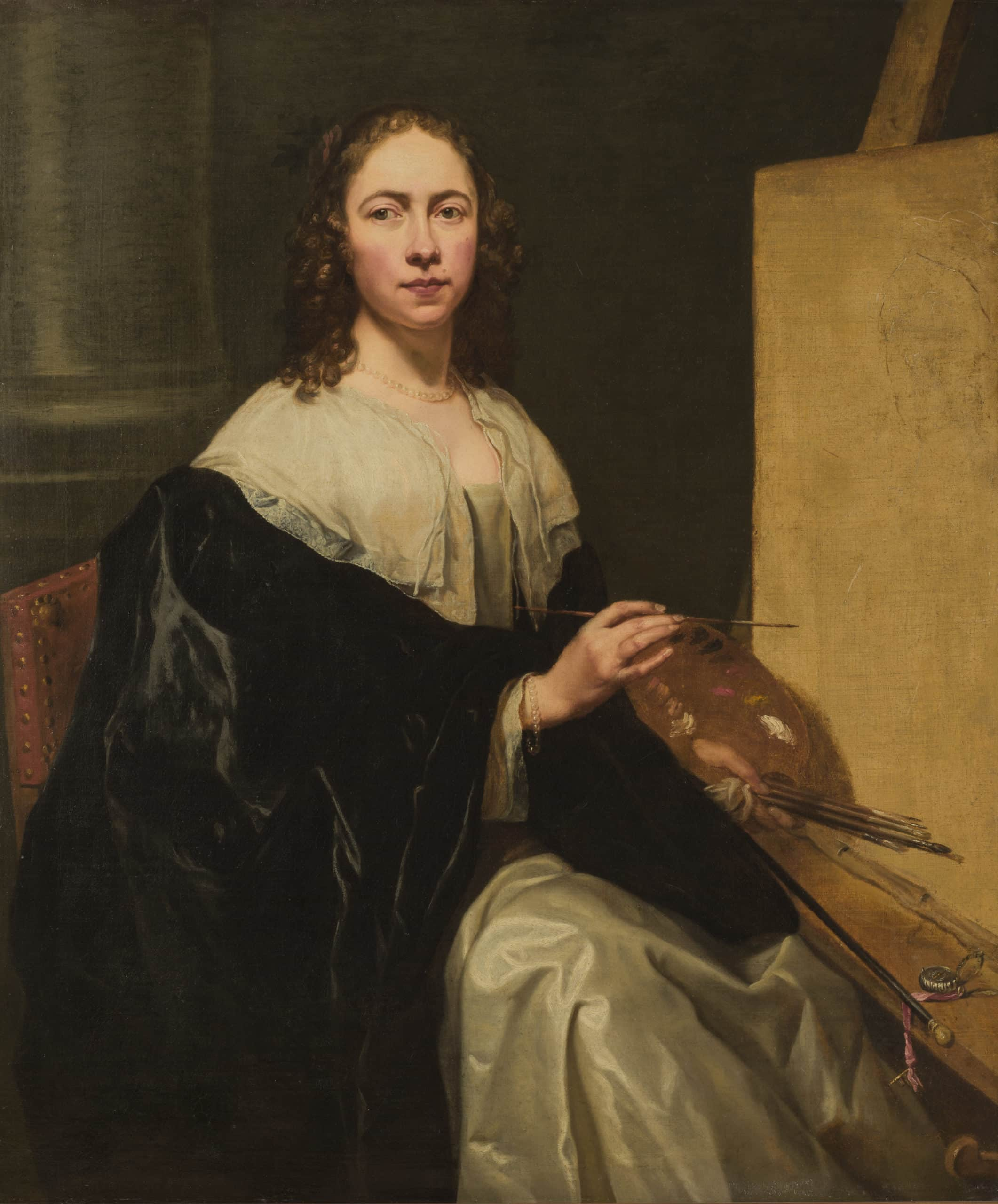
- Year: 1640s
- Medium: oil paint, canvas
- Dimensions: 120 cm (47 in) × 102 cm (40 in)
- Owner: Frederick Spencer, 4th Earl Spencer

Self-Portrait with Easel is a painting by the Flemish artist Michaelina Wautier. It apparently shows a female artist starting on her painting, having sketched the outline of the head of a portrait. It was painted some time in the 1640s. Despite having been part of various art collections since being completed, it was only identified as being by Wautier in 2013. For a long time, the painting was attributed to the Italian artist Artemisia Gentileschi. Indeed, a 1905 photograph of the painting showed the name Artemisia on the base of the column to the left. It is unknown who added this signature, which is no longer present. A watch with a pink ribbon attached to it sits on the easel, but the precise reason for its inclusion is not known.

The painting is in a private collection.

Since the person depicted in this painting does not resemble the woman on the right in the Triumph of Bacchus (Wautier), widely believed to be a self-portrait of Michaelina Wautier due to both per prominence and her gaze out at the viewer, Jahel Sanzsalzar has suggested that the painting of the woman at the easel is a portrait of Anna Maria van Schurman rather than a self-portrait. There is no known engraving, identified as a portrait of Michaelina Wautier, that can be compared with either supposed painted self-portrait to confirm the identification of the sitter.

== See also ==
- List of paintings by Michaelina Wautier
