= Saint Joachim (Wautier) =

1650s painting by Michaelina Wautier

St. Joachim
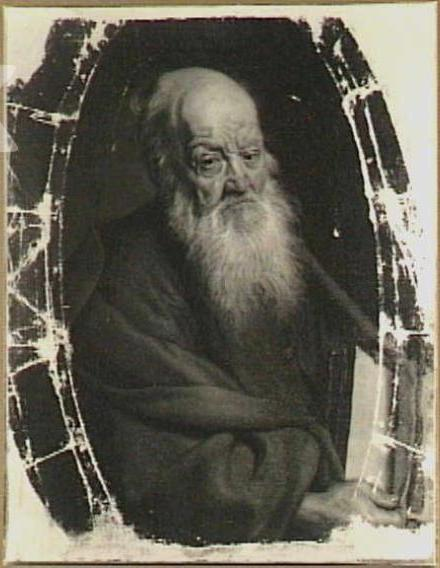
- Artist: Michaelina Wautier
- Year: c. 1650
- Medium: oil paint, canvas
- Dimensions: 80 cm (31 in) × 46 cm (18 in)
- Accession: GG_1911

Saint Joachim is a painting by the Flemish artist Michaelina Wautier. It shows the saint, the father of the Virgin Mary, holding a book, a symbol of the linen traders that he represented.

Along with The Triumph of Bacchus, Saint Joseph, and Saint Joachim Reading a Book, the painting was one of at least four owned by Archduke Leopold Wilhelm of Austria. It was painted sometime between 1650 and 1655.

The painting still hangs in Austria as part of the Kunsthistorisches Museum.

== See also ==
- List of paintings by Michaelina Wautier
