= The Education of the Virgin (Wautier) =

c. 1650 painting by Michaelina Wautier

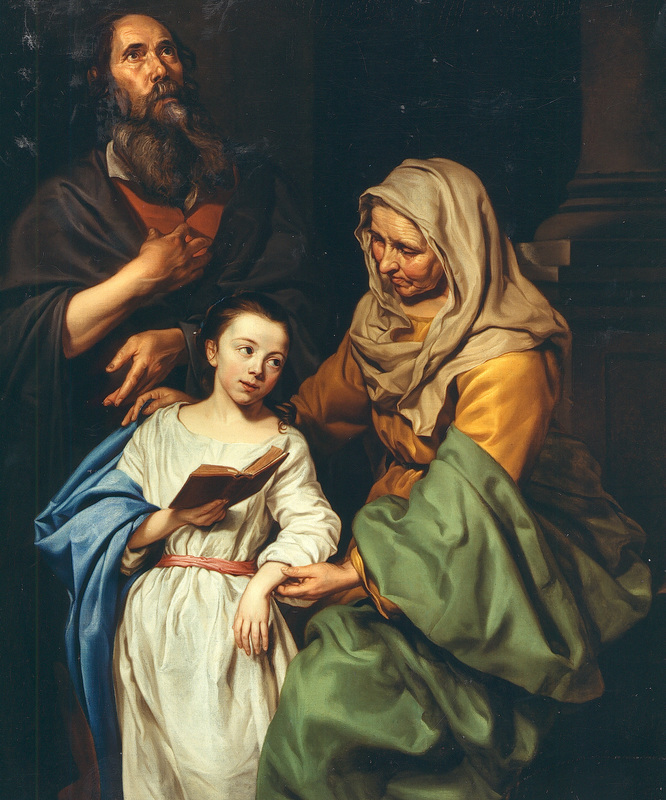
- Artist: Michaelina Wautier
- Year: 1656
- Medium: oil on canvas
- Location: Private collection (on loan to the Mauritshuis since 2021)

The Education of the Virgin is a painting by the Flemish artist Michaelina Wautier. It shows the young Virgin Mary with her mother Anne and her father Joachim. In the pillar on the right is the inscription "Michaelina Wautier, invenit, et fecit 1656", indicating that she both composed and executed the painting in 1656. The work is now in a private collection.

== See also ==
- List of paintings by Michaelina Wautier
