= Portrait of a Commander in the Spanish Army =

Painting by Michaelina Wautier

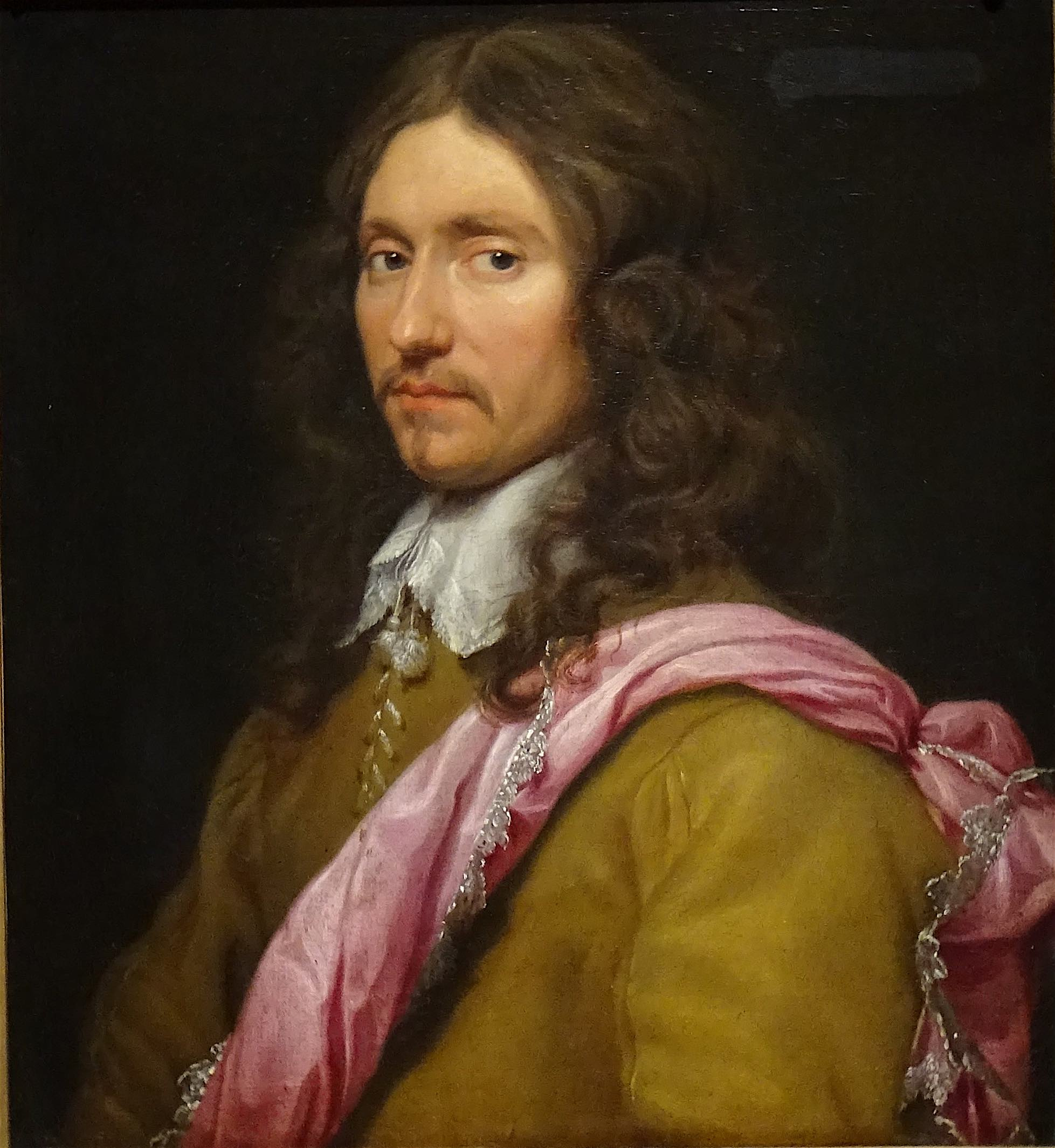
- Artist: Michaelina Wautier
- Year: 1646
- Subject: Don Antonio Pimentel de Prado
- Location: Royal Museums of Fine Arts of Belgium, Brussels
- 50°50′30.048″N 04°21′29.657″E

The Portrait of a Commander in the Spanish Army is a painting by the Flemish artist Michaelina Wautier. It was painted in 1646. It is one of her earliest known portraits, though the maturity of the execution of the painting implies this is not her first painting. It now hangs in the Royal Museum of Fine Arts in Brussels, having been in the royal collection since 1812.

The sitter is Don Antonio Pimentel de Prado. He wears a sash known as a bandi carmesi, used at the time by military figures to indicate their senior position. The use of the colour pink was reserved for the Spanish army, hence the attribution of the sitter as a commander in the Spanish army.

== See also ==
- List of paintings by Michaelina Wautier
