= Young Man Smoking a Pipe =

1650s painting by Michaelina Wautier

- Year: 1650s

Young Man Smoking a Pipe is a painting by the Flemish artist Michaelina Wautier. It was painted in 1656. The content is possibly part of a series related to the five senses, with the pipe smoker in the painting representing the sense of smell.

The painting is in the private collection of Bijl-Van Urk B.V.

== See also ==
- List of paintings by Michaelina Wautier
