= Mystical Marriage of Saint Catherine of Alexandria (Wautier) =

1649 painting by Michaelina Wautier

The Mystical Marriage of St. Catherine of Alexandria
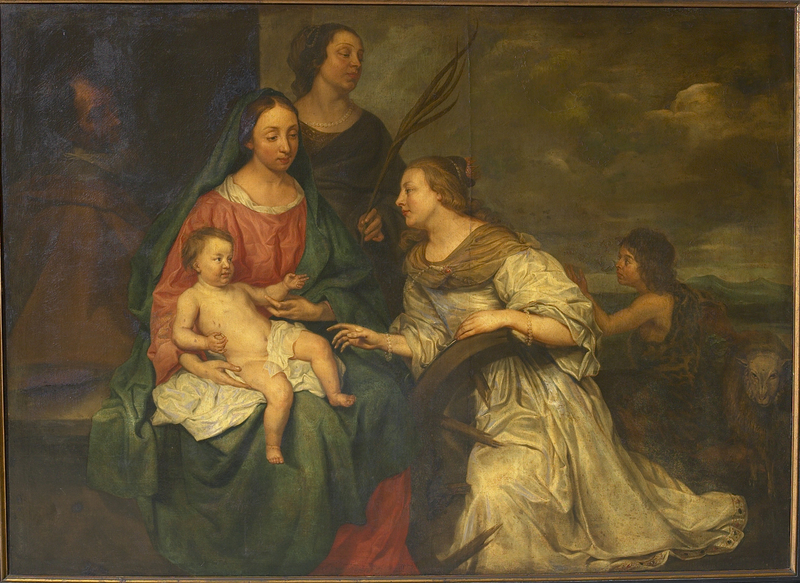
- Year: 1649

The Mystical Marriage of Saint Catherine of Alexandria is a large religious painting by the Flemish artist Michaelina Wautier. It was painted in 1649 and hangs in the diocesan seminary in Namur.

== See also ==
- List of paintings by Michaelina Wautier
