= Saint John the Evangelist (Wautier) =

1650s painting by Michaelina Wautier

- Portrait historié of a Young Man as John the Evangelist
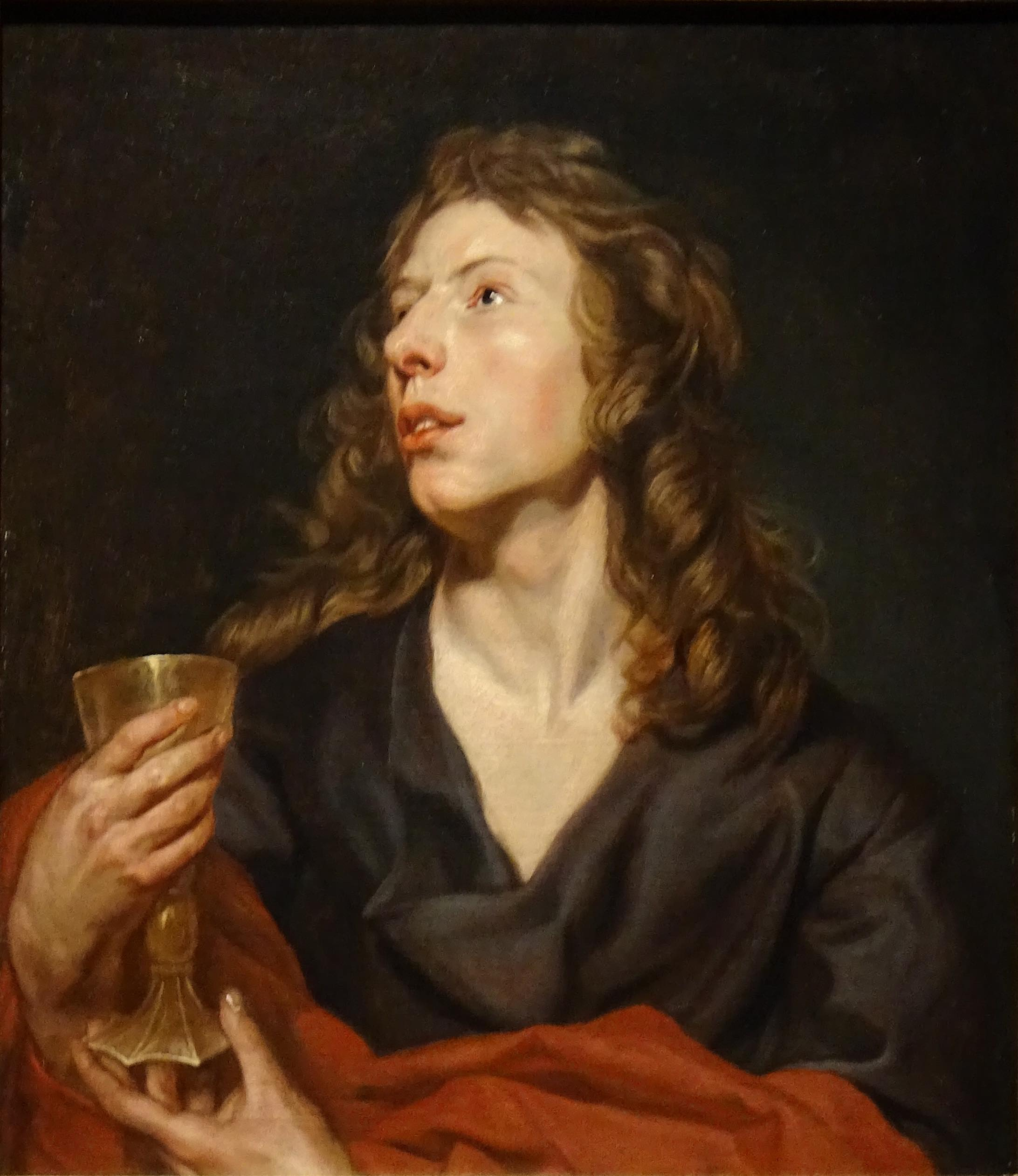
- Year: 1650s
- Location: Italy

Saint John the Evangelist is a painting by Flemish artist Michaelina Wautier. It depicts Saint John the Evangelist holding a chalice, referencing the legend in which he survived drinking a cup of poison as a testament to his faith. Painted in the 1650s, the work is now part of a private collection in Italy.

== See also ==
- List of paintings by Michaelina Wautier
