= Annunciation (Wautier) =

1650s painting by Michaelina Wautier

- The Annunciation
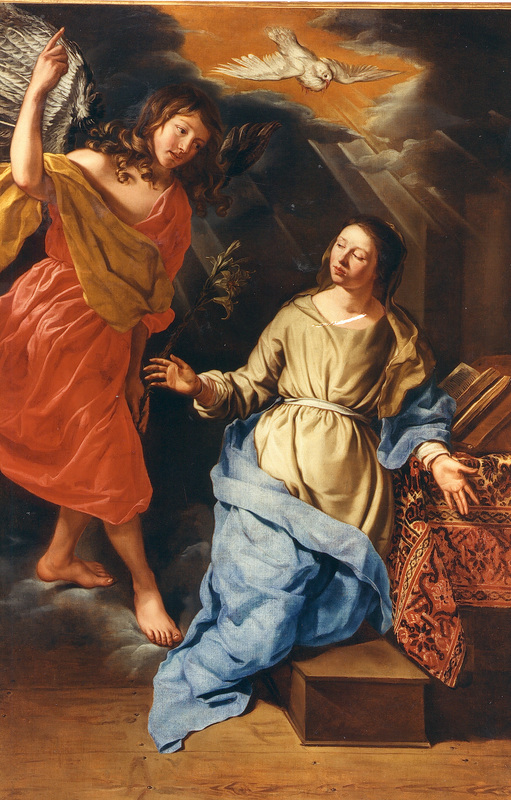
- Year: 1659
- Accession No.: 77.30.1

The Annunciation is a painting by the Flemish artist Michaelina Wautier. It is dated 1659, and is one of Wautier's last known paintings.

It now hangs in the gallery at Marly-le-Roi in France.

== See also ==
- List of paintings by Michaelina Wautier
