= Saint John the Baptist as a Boy (Wautier) =

1650s painting by Michaelina Wautier

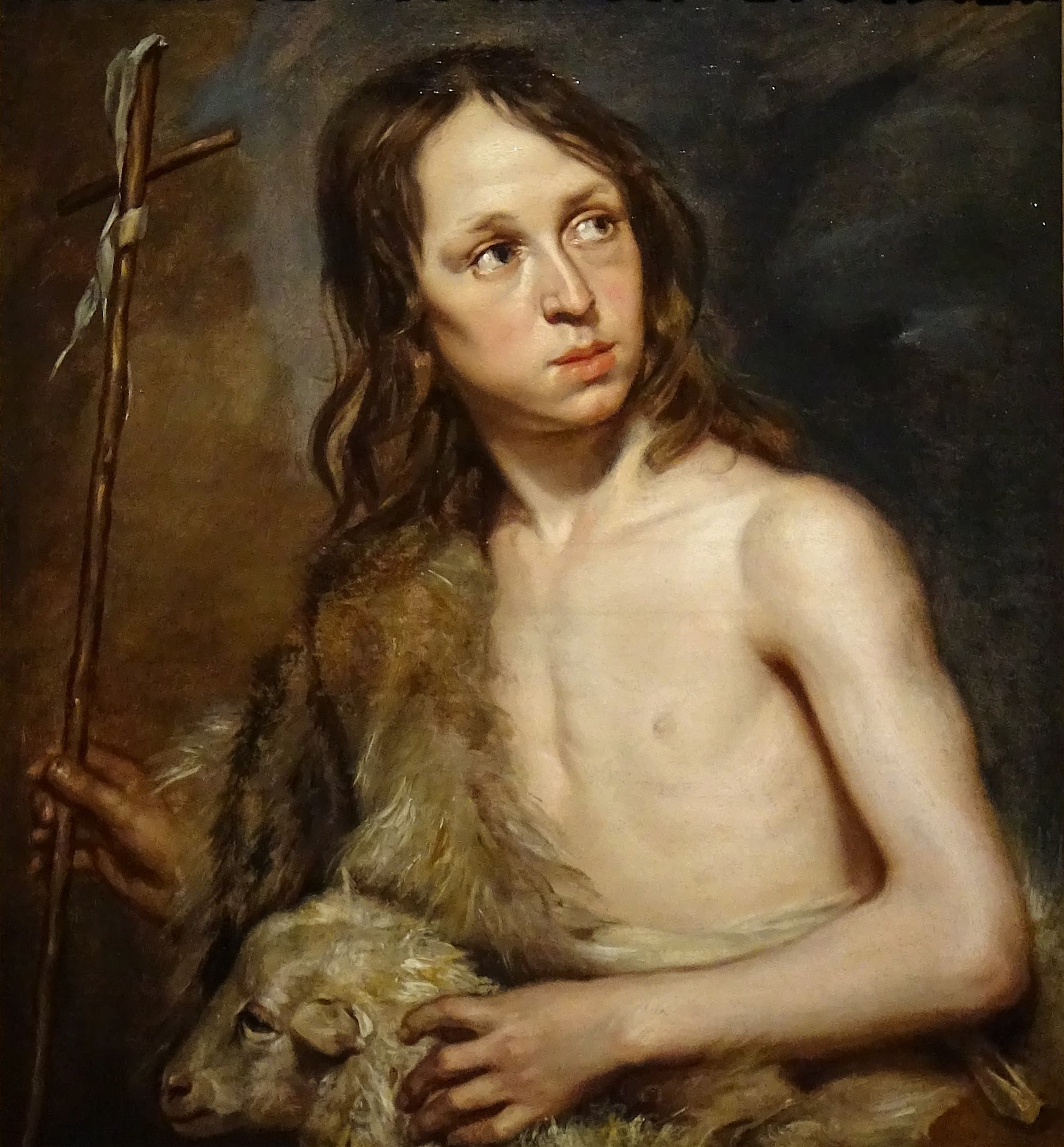
- Year: 1650s

Saint John the Baptist as a Boy is a painting by the Flemish artist Michaelina Wautier. It depicts Saint John the Baptist as a young shepherd, wearing a sheepskin cover over his right shoulder and with the traditional attributes of a lamp and a simple wooden staff in the shape of a cross. It was painted in the 1650s and is now in the collection of the Museo Lazaro Galdiano in Madrid. The work was previously attributed to the Spanish painter Juan Martín Cabezalero.

== See also ==
- List of paintings by Michaelina Wautier
