= Flower Garland with Dragonfly =

1650s painting by Michaelina Wautier

Flower garland with Dragonfly
- A garland of flowers suspended between two animal skulls
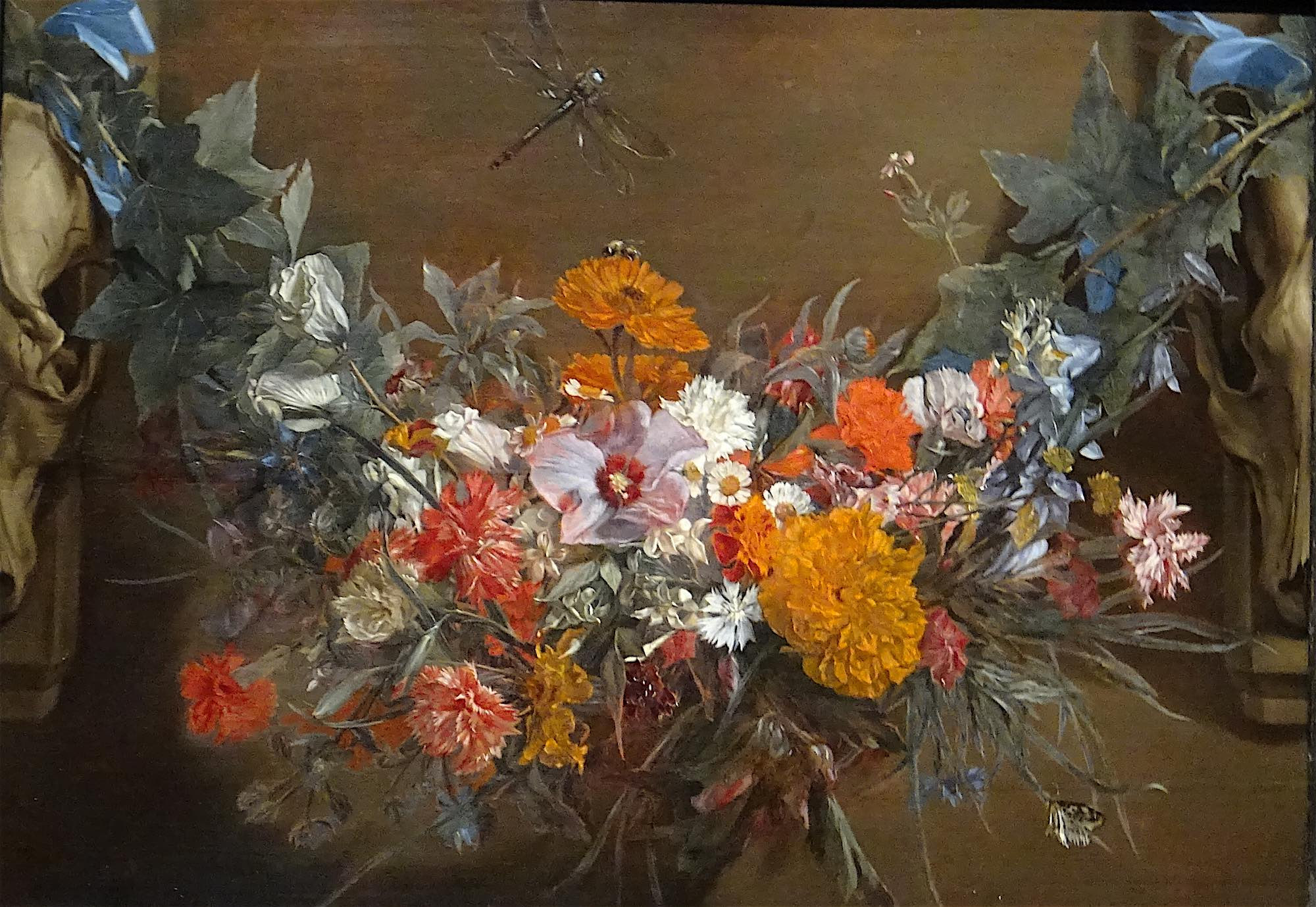
- Artist: Michaelina Wautier
- Year: 1650s
- Medium: oil paint, oak panel
- Dimensions: 41.1 cm (16.2 in) × 57.4 cm (22.6 in)
- Owner: Egon Rusche, Thomas Rusche
- Collection: Gebruder Douwes, SØR Rusche Collection
- Identifiers: RKDimages ID: 296603

Flower Garland with Dragonfly is a painting by the Flemish artist Michaelina Wautier. It was painted in 1652.

== See also ==
- List of paintings by Michaelina Wautier
