= List of paintings by Michaelina Wautier =

The following is a list of paintings by Michaelina Wautier that are generally accepted as autograph by the Katlijne Van der Stighelen catalog and other sources.

| image | title | collection | inventory number | year | reference |
|---|---|---|---|---|---|
| | Self-portrait with Easel | Private collection | | 1640s | |
| | Two Boys Blowing Bubbles | Seattle Art Museum | 58.140 | 1640s | |
| | Portrait of a Commander in the Spanish Army | Royal Museums of Fine Arts of Belgium | 297 | 1646 | |
| | Mystical Marriage of Saint Catherine of Alexandria | Diocesan Seminary, Namur | | 1649 | |
| | Two Girls as Saint Agnes and Saint Dorothea | Royal Museum of Fine Arts Antwerp | 599 | 1650s | |
| | Triumph of Bacchus | Kunsthistorisches Museum | GG_3548 | 1650 | |
| | Saint Joachim Reading a Book | Kunsthistorisches Museum | GG_375 | 1650 | |
| | Saint Joseph | Kunsthistorisches Museum | GG_376 | 1650 | |
| | Saint John the Baptist as a Boy | Museo Lázaro Galdiano | 84 | 1650 | |
| | Saint Joachim | Kunsthistorisches Museum | GG_1911 | 1650 | |
| | Judith with the Head of Holofernes and her Maid | Sint-Waldetrudiskerk | | 1650 | |
| | To Each his Own | The Phoebus Foundation | | 1650 | |
| | Hearing | Museum of Fine Arts, Boston | | 1650 | |
| | Portrait of an Officer, possibly Pierre Wautier | Private collection | | 1650 | |
| | Tobacco (Smell?) | Private collection | | 1650 | |
| | Study of a Young Woman | Private collection | | 1650 | |
| | Portrait historié of a Young Man as John the Evangelist | Private collection | | 1650 | |
| | Flower Garland with Dragonfly | Private collection | | 1652 | |
| | Flower Garland with Butterfly | Private collection | | 1652 | |
| | Portrait of Martino Martini (1614–1661), Jesuit missionary in China | Private collection | | 1654 | |
| | Portrait of a Young Man | Royal Museum of Fine Arts Antwerp | 5149 | 1655 | |
| | Education of the Virgin, with a possible self-portrait | Private collection | | 1656 | |
| | Young Man Smoking a Pipe | Private collection | | 1656 | |
| | The Annunciation | Musée-promenade de Marly-le-Roi | 77.30.1 | 1659 | |

== Sources ==
- Exhibition website by Museum aan de Stroom
- Michaelina Wautier (1614–1689), catalog and 2018 art exhibition in Antwerp, by Katlijne Van der Stighelen, 2018. Handbook for exhibition
- Michaelina Wautier, Painter 2025 exhibit at the Kunsthistorisches Museum, Vienna
- RKD record for Michaelina Wautier
- BALat record for Michaelina Wautier in Royal Institute for Cultural Heritage
