= Saint Joachim Reading a Book =

1650s painting by Michaelina Wautier

St Joachim Reading a Book
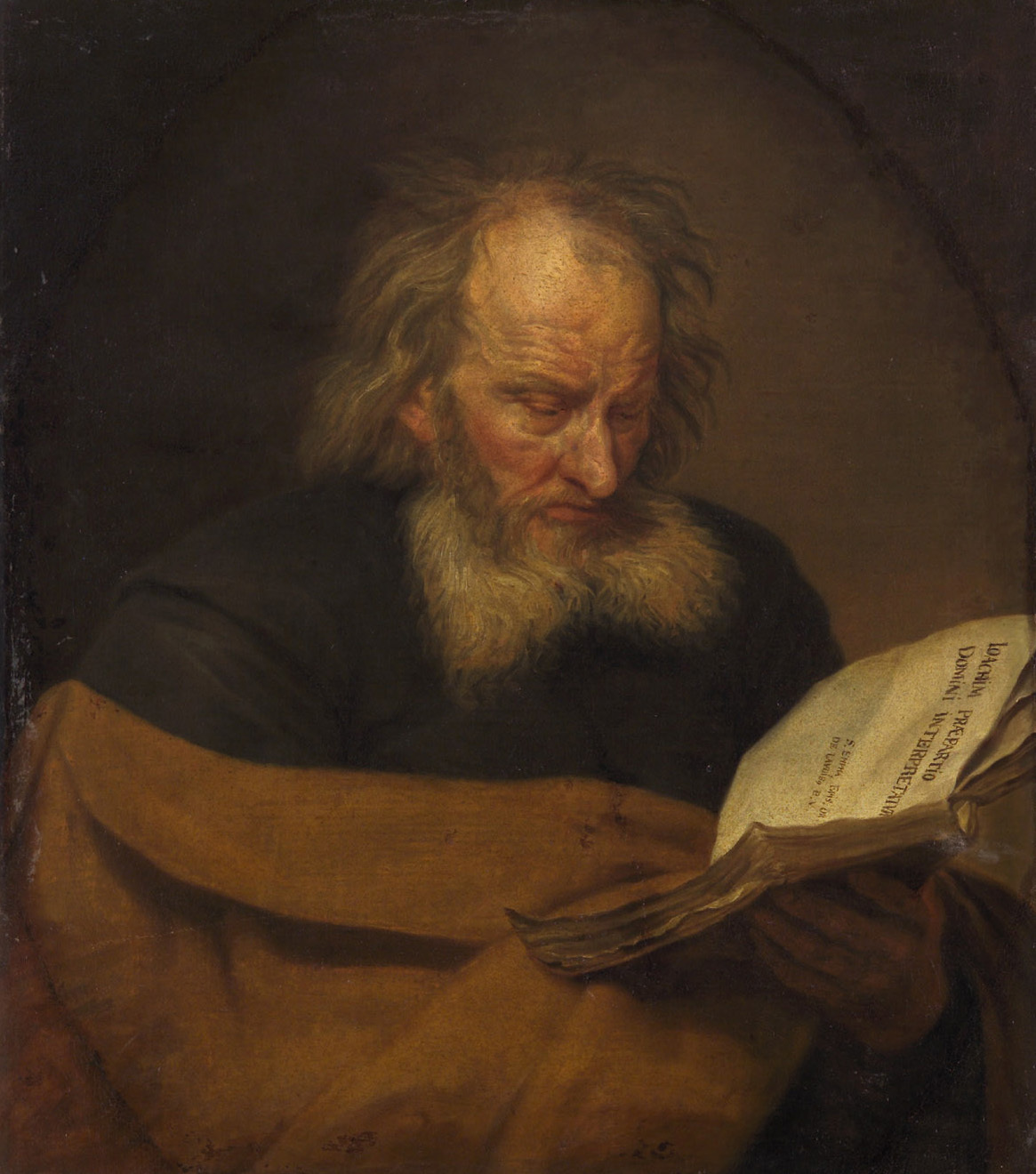
- Artist: Michaelina Wautier
- Year: 1650s
- Dimensions: 75 cm (30 in) × 64 cm (25 in)
- Location: Kunsthistorisches Museum
- Owner: Archduke Leopold Wilhelm of Austria
- Accession no.: GG_375
- Identifiers: RKDimages ID: 37759

Saint Joachim Reading a Book is a painting by the Flemish artist Michaelina Wautier. It was painted some time in the 1650s. The painting is in the Kunsthistorisches Museum, Vienna, where it came into the collection through the group of paintings moved from Brussels to the Stallburg in 1656 with the rest of Archduke Leopold of Austria's collection.

It forms a pendant with her Saint Joseph.

== See also ==
- List of paintings by Michaelina Wautier
