= Saint Joseph (Wautier) =

1650 painting by Michaelina Wautier

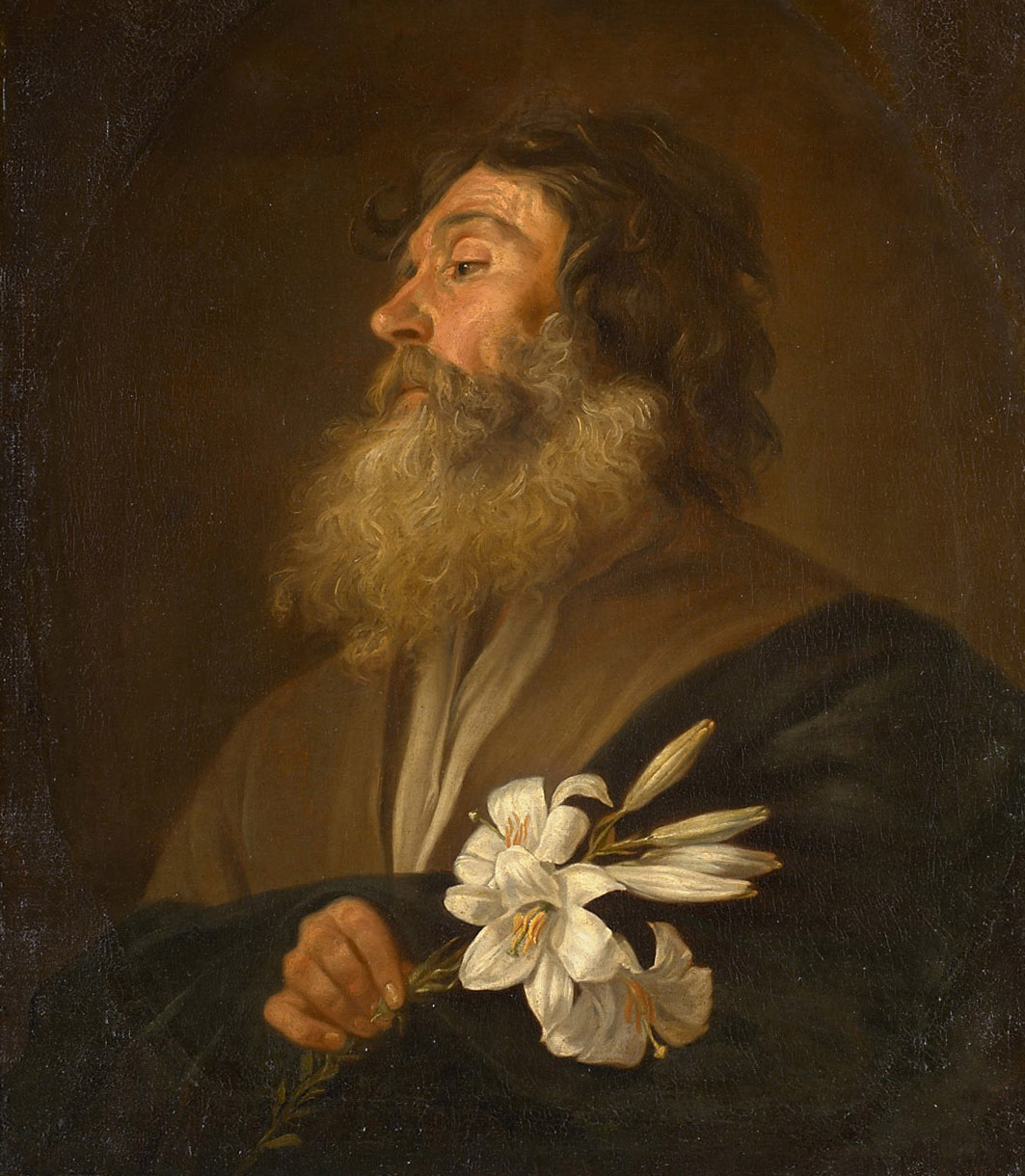
- Artist: Michaelina Wautier
- Year: 1650–1656
- Dimensions: 76 cm (30 in) × 66 cm (26 in)
- Location: Kunsthistorisches Museum
- Owner: Archduke Leopold Wilhelm of Austria
- Accession no.: GG_376
- Identifiers: RKDimages ID: 37757

Saint Joseph is a painting by the Flemish artist Michaelina Wautier, painted some time between 1650 and 1656. It is one of many paintings by Wautier in the Kunsthistorisches Museum, Vienna, where it came into the collection through the group of paintings moved from Brussels to the Stallburg in 1656 with the rest of Archduke Leopold of Austria's collection.

It forms a pendant with her Saint Joachim Reading a Book.

== See also ==
- List of paintings by Michaelina Wautier
