= Robert van Asseliers =

Chancellor of Brabant from 1651 to 1661

Robert d'Asseliers

Chancellor of Brabant
- In office 5 May 1651 – 28 November 1661
- Monarch: Philip IV of Spain
- Preceded by: François de Kinschot
- Succeeded by: Philippe de Steenhuys

Personal details
- Born: Robert van Asseliers; 2 December 1576 Antwerp, Duchy of Brabant, Spanish Netherlands
- Died: 28 November 1661 (aged 84) Brussels, Duchy of Brabant, Spanish Netherlands
- Spouse: Antoinette Vandenberghe
- Children: 3
- Education: University of Leuven

Robert van Asseliers (2 December 1576 – 28 November 1661) was the chancellor of Brabant from 1651 until 1661.

== Early life ==
Coming from a family of officeholders in the duchy of Brabant, Asseliers studied at the University of Leuven, graduating as a Doctor of Law. He married Antoinette Vandenberghe in 1608; they had a son and two daughters.

== Career ==
In 1619, Asseliers succeeded his father as a councillor on the Council of Brabant. He went on to become a member of the Privy Council of the Habsburg Netherlands, the Council of State, and the Supreme Council of Flanders in Madrid.

Asseliers became chancellor of Brabant on 5 May 1651. Because of his advanced age—taking office at the age of 74—a vice-chancellor, Joannes van Thulden, brother of Diodorus Tuldenus, was appointed to help him in office. Asseliers died on 28 November 1661.
