= Jan Baptist Christyn the Younger =

Jan Baptist Christyn the Younger (c.1635–1707), knight, was a lawyer and author in the Spanish Netherlands.

== Life ==
Christyn was born in Brussels around 1635. As a Licentiate of Laws he practised law in the city of Brussels for a number of years, until in 1697 appointed a judge of the Council of Brabant alongside his uncle Libert-François Christyn. He died in Brussels in 1707.

He wrote a number of works on legal matters. Les délices des Pays-Bas: ou Description géographique et historique des XVII. provinces belgiques, a historical chorography of the Low Countries first published in 1697, has been attributed to him, but also to another of his uncles, Chancellor Jan Baptist Christyn (I).

== Works ==
- Placcaeten, ordonnantien, etc. van Brabant, vol. 2 (Brussels, 1676) – completing the work of Antonius Anselmo
- Brabandts recht, dat is generale costumen van den lande ende hertochdomme van Brabant (2 vols, Antwerp, 1682-1683)
- Deckheri dissertationum juris et decisionum libri II (Brussels, 1686)
- Consuetudines bruxellenses latine redditae (Brussels, 1689)
- Traité des droits honorifiques des seigneurs dans les églises, par feu Maréchal, avocat au parlement de Paris, avec un traité du droit de patronage, de la présentation aux bénéfices, etc., un traité des dixmes, par les avocats Denis, Simon et Danty,:.. augmenté de six sentences rendues au Conseil de Brabant, en matière de droits honorifique (2 vols., Paris, 1726)
