= Council of Troubles =

1567 Spanish Netherlands Tribunal

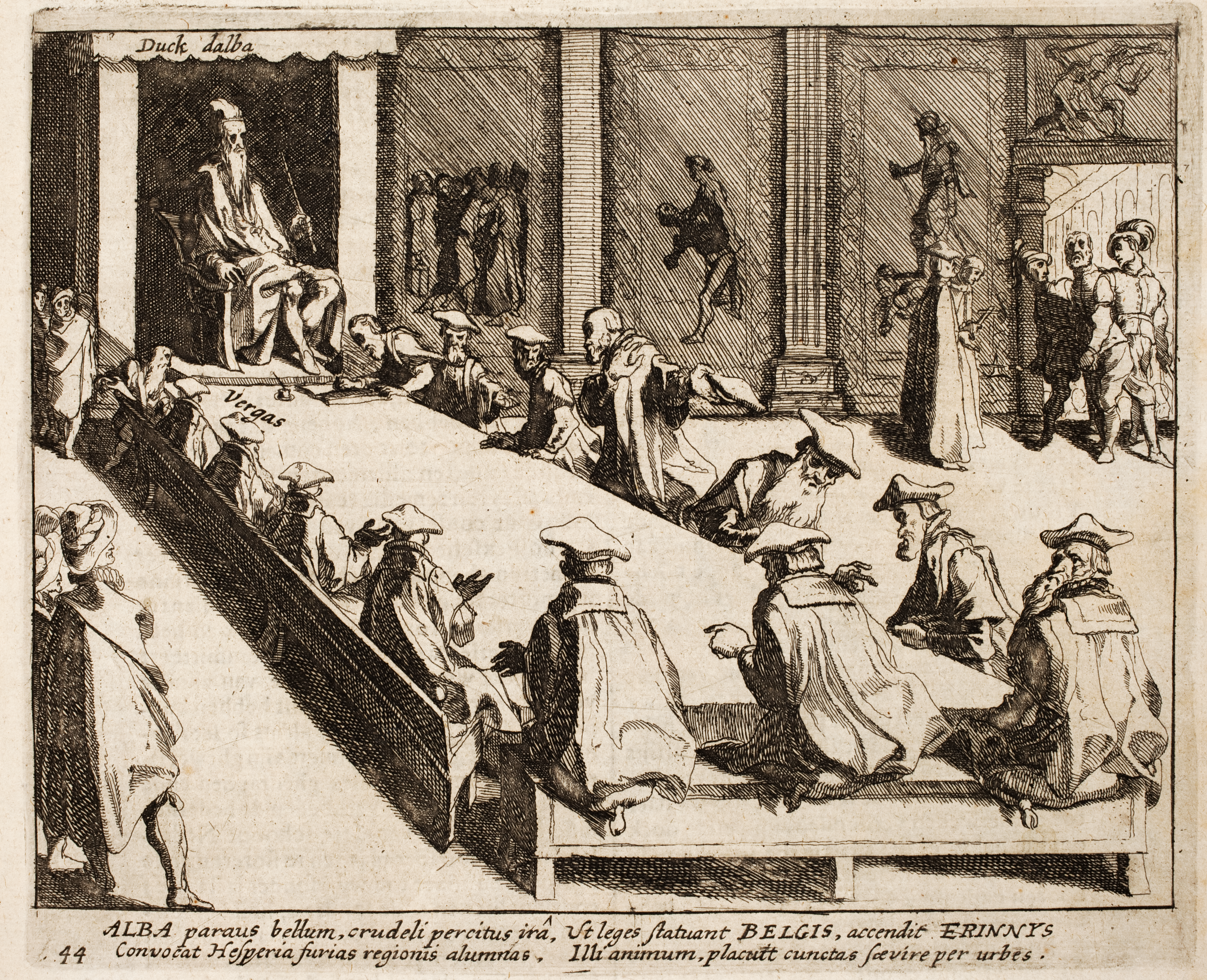
1616 engraving depicting the Duke of Alba presiding over the Council of Troubles by Simon Frisius

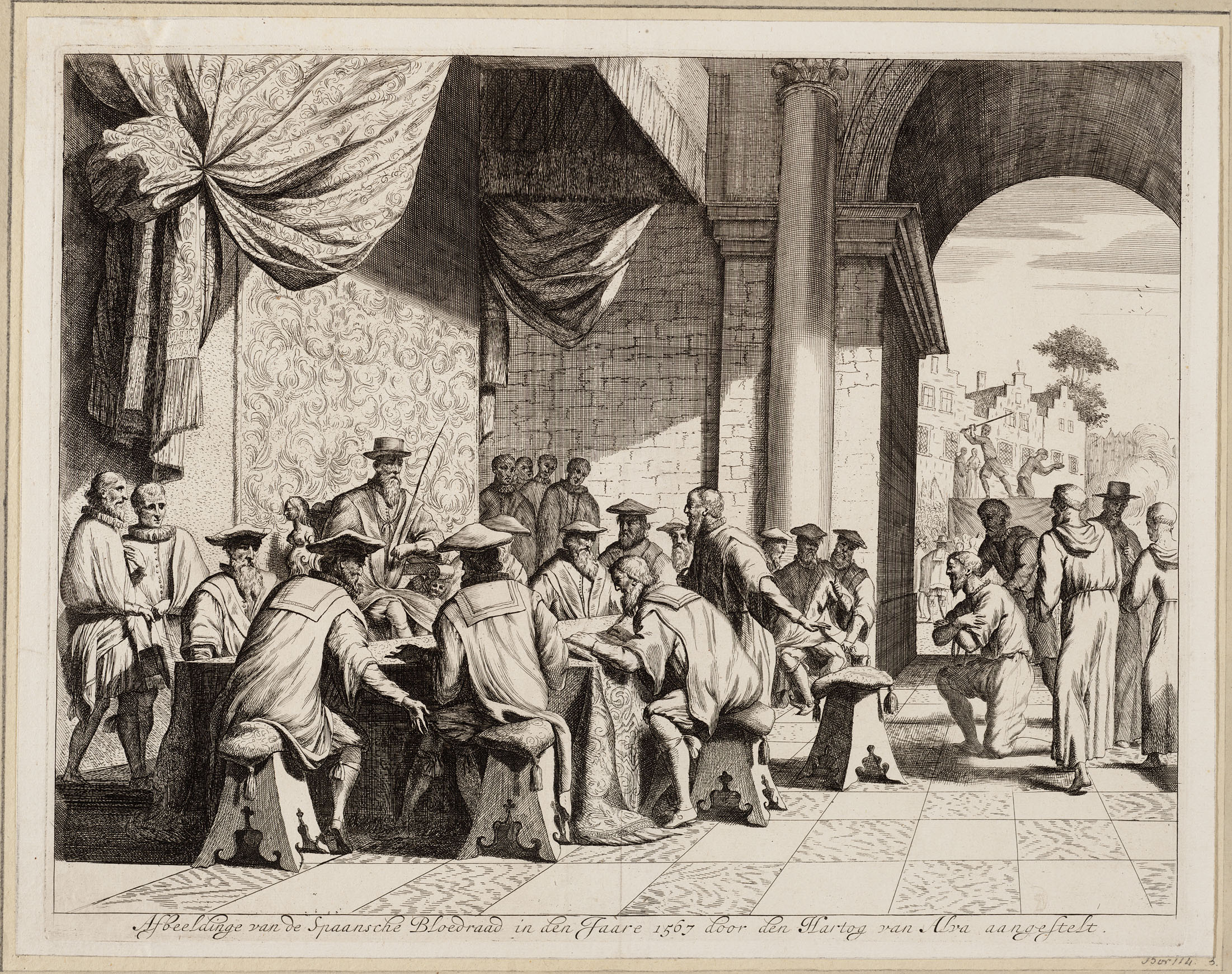
Another 1679 engraving depicting the Council of Troubles by Jan Luyken

The Council of Troubles (usual English translation of Dutch: Raad van Beroerten, or Spanish: Tribunal de los Tumultos, or French: Conseil des Troubles) was the special tribunal instituted on 9 September 1567 by Fernando Álvarez de Toledo, 3rd Duke of Alba, governor-general of the Habsburg Netherlands, on the orders of Philip II of Spain to punish the ringleaders of the recent political and religious troubles in the Netherlands. Due to the many death sentences pronounced by the tribunal, it also became known as the Council of Blood (Bloedraad in Dutch and Conseil de Sang in French). The tribunal would be abolished by Alba's successor, Luis de Zúñiga y Requesens on 7 June 1574 in exchange for a subsidy from the States-General of the Netherlands, but in practice, it remained in session until the popular revolution in Brussels of the summer of 1576.

== Background ==
During the final two years of the regency of Margaret of Parma over the Habsburg Netherlands, circumstances—political (disaffection of the high nobility with its diminished role in the councils of state), religious (disaffection over the persecution of heretics and the reform of the organisation of the Catholic Church in the Netherlands, especially the creation of new dioceses), and economic (a famine in 1565)—conspired to bring about a number of political and social events that shook the regime to its foundations. A League of Nobles (mostly members of the lower nobility) protested the severity of the persecution of heretics with a petition to the Regent, who conceded the demands temporarily. This may have encouraged the Calvinists in the country to follow the iconoclastic depredations on Catholic churches that also burst out in France in the summer of 1566.

Although this iconoclastic fury was soon suppressed by the authorities, and the concessions to the Calvinists retracted, these "troubles" sufficiently disturbed the Court in Madrid to motivate Philip to send his trusted commander, the Duke of Alba, with an army of Spanish troops to restore order in the Netherlands. When he arrived there, his first measures so offended the Regent that she resigned in protest in early September 1567.

== History ==
=== Patent instituting the Council ===
One of these measures was the institution (9 September 1567) of a council to investigate and punish the events described above. This council was only later to become known as the "Council of Troubles," as for the moment it was presented as just an advisory council, next to the three collateral Habsburg councils (Council of State, Privy Council, and Council of Finances), and the Great Council of Mechelen. The fact, however, that it superseded these preexisting councils for this express purpose, and that the new tribunal (as it turned out to be) ignored the judicial privileges enshrined in such constitutional documents as the Joyous Entry of the ancient Duchy of Brabant (which Philip had affirmed on his accession to the ducal throne in 1556), shocked the constitutional conscience of the Regent, and the Dutch politicians.

Initially, the council was composed of the Duke himself (as president), assisted by two high Netherlandish nobles, Charles de Berlaymont (the alleged author of the epithet Geuzen) and Philippe de Noircarmes (as vice-presidents). Members were a number of prominent jurists, recruited from the Councils of the provinces, such as Adrianus Nicolai (chancellor of Guelders), Jacob Meertens (president of the council of Artois), Pieter Asset, Jacob Hessels (councillor of Ghent), and his colleague Johan de la Porte (advocaat-fiscaal of Flanders). Jean du Bois, procureur-generaal at the High Court became chief prosecutor. The most influential members were reportedly two Spaniards, who came with Alba from Spain: Juan de Vargas and Luis del Río. Jacques de la Torre (a secretary of the Privy Council) became the principal secretary of the new council. Only these Spanish members apparently had the right to vote on verdicts.

=== Organization and procedure ===
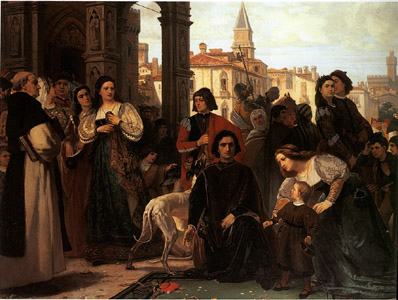
1871 painting by Charles Soubre depicting a noble family in front of the Council of Troubles

At first, the council acted as an advisory council of the Duke, who decided on all verdicts himself. As the number of cases grew into the thousands in the years following the early sensational trials, this was not practicable. Alba therefore instituted two criminal and two civil Chambers for the Council in 1569, and expanded the number of councillors appreciably, at the same time replacing a few councillors (like the Burgundian Claude Belin), who had shown an undesirable degree of independence. The most important of the new members was the new secretary Jeronimo de Roda, who received the same powers as Vargas and Del Rio.

The criminal cases were apportioned to the two criminal chambers on a regional basis. The civil chambers were charged with the many appeals against confiscations of the material goods that were usually part of the death sentences or sentences of perpetual banishment. The management of these forfeited possessions was also an important task of the civil chambers. The case load was nevertheless so overwhelming, that at the time of the formal abolition of the council a staggering 14,000 cases were still undecided. Aside from judicial functions, the council also had an important advisory role in the codification of criminal procedure in the Criminal ordinances of 1570.

After the initial, rather chaotic period, the procedure followed in trials was that all criminal courts had to report cases within the remit of the council (heresy and treason) to the council. Depending on the importance of the case, the council would then either leave the case to the lower court for settlement, or take it up itself. In case the matter was called up from the lower court, it would either be settled by the council itself, or the lower court would receive instructions about the sentence it would have to pronounce.

However, the government did not leave the prosecutions to chance in the lower courts. From the beginning, commissioners were sent out to the provinces to actively pursue heretics and political undesirables. Those commissioners were an important source of cases, and they also functioned as provincial annexes of the central council in Brussels. The trials were conducted completely in writing. Written indictments were produced that had to be answered in writing by the defendants. The verdicts were in writing also. The verdicts generally had little basis in law as it was understood at the time. The accusation was usually crimen laesae majestatis or high treason. This, of course, was a crime well-founded in Roman law (which was still followed in the Netherlands at the time). The content was nebulous. The councillors (and Alba himself) made it up as they went according to the exigencies of the situation. Many contemporaries viewed the proceedings as purely arbitrary. The fact that the proceedings seemed to have been guided only by verbal instructions of Alba did little to ameliorate this impression.

=== Notorious cases ===
The most notorious cases were those of the political elite of the Netherlands. Alba indicted most members of the former Council of State in late 1567. Most indictees (like William the Silent) had gone abroad for their health, but two prominent members Lamoral, Count of Egmont and Philip de Montmorency, Count of Horn were apprehended in September 1567. Despite the fact that they were members of the Order of the Golden Fleece, and claimed the privilege to be tried by their peers, Philip denied this claim, and they were tried and convicted by the Council of Troubles. Both were sentenced to death and executed on 5 June 1568. But these were only the most eminent victims.

According to historical writer Jonathan Israel, almost nine thousand people, from all levels of society, were convicted of heresy or treason. As most of these were tried in absentia, however, only about 1,000 of these sentences were carried out. The other convicts had to live in exile, their possessions confiscated.

As regards the first objective: four days before the execution of the Counts of Egmont and Horne there was the wholesale execution of eighteen lesser nobles (among whom the three brothers Bronckhorst van Batenburg) in Brussels. Many other nobles, especially from Holland, where a large part of the ridderschap had been implicated in the League of Nobles, fled abroad (still forfeiting their lands). Among those were Willem Bloys van Treslong (who in 1572 captured Den Briel), Gijsbrecht van Duivenvoorde (who would be a prominent defender in the siege of Haarlem in 1573), Jacob van Duivenvoorde (later a prominent defender of Leiden in 1574) and Willem van Zuylen van Nijevelt (a Utrecht iconoclast). But members of the urban patriciate were also persecuted. The Advocate of the States of Holland, Jacob van den Eynde was arrested, but died in captivity before his trial ended. In Haarlem Dirck Volckertszoon Coornhert was arrested, but he managed to escape, Lenaert Jansz de Graeff from Amsterdam fled to Bruges and later became captain of the Sea Beggars in the Capture of Brielle. Others, including Jan van Casembroot (from Bruges) and Anthony van Stralen, Lord of Merksem (Mayor of Antwerp) were less fortunate.

Many more lesser-known people were engulfed in the wholesale condemnations that the Council issued like clockwork. The first were 84 inhabitants of Valenciennes (then still part of the Netherlands) on 4 January 1568; followed on 20 February by 95 people from several places in Flanders; 21 February: 25 inhabitants of Thielt and 46 of Mechelen, etc. Thousands somehow related to Calvinism fled to more hospitable places, including such Amsterdam families as De Graeff, Bicker, Laurens Reael, Huydecoper van Maarsseveen, (in Dutch), Hooft, and Middelburg (Boreel, Van der Perre and Van Vosbergen) who would later become prominent Regent families in those cities. The exodus proceeded in two main waves: in the spring of 1567 (those who did not await Alba's arrival), and again after a round of wholesale arrests, in the winter of 1567/68. The total number of people involved has been estimated at 60,000.

Alba hoped the confiscations that accompanied the condemnations would be an important source of income for the Crown. However, Philip directed him to pay new pensions from the proceeds to people who had served the Crown well in previous years. Also, the council's civil chambers were swamped with claims concerning the legality of the confiscations. Nevertheless, the proceeds reached half a million ducats annually according to a letter from the Spanish ambassador in France to Philip in 1572.

=== Abolition ===
After Alba's replacement with Requesens as governor-general the Council continued its work but it became increasingly clear that its proceedings were counterproductive in combatting the Rebellion. Philip therefore authorized Requesens to abolish the Council in 1574, if the States General were prepared to make adequate political concessions. After the promise of a large subsidy by the States General the council was formally abolished by Requesens on 7 June 1574, contingent upon payment of the subsidy.

== Aftermath ==
As the subsidy remained unpaid, the Council remained in being during the remainder of Requesens's tenure. No further death sentences were pronounced. After Requesens's death in March 1576 a power vacuum ensued. The Council of State now demanded to see the instructions and records of the tribunal. However, the secretary, De Roda, replied that there were no written instructions. When asked how the council had managed to try and condemn so many people, he said that the council had condemned nobody: all sentences were pronounced by the governors-general themselves; the council had technically only prepared the drafts.

On 4 September 1576, revolutionary bands, led by Jacques de Glymes, bailli of Brabant, arrested the members of the Council of State (the acting Brussels government). This ended at the same time the Council of Troubles (which the Council of State had not dared to disperse). A large part of the archives of the council were lost shortly after this action but many duplicates are still extant in Spanish archives. Prominent members of the council were arrested by the Rebels: Del Río was sent to the headquarters of the Prince of Orange, where he was subjected to rigorous examination concerning the doings of the late council, but was later released in exchange for another prisoner. The notorious Hessels, accused in popular lore of sleeping through many trials and exclaiming Ad patibulum ("To the gallows!") whenever he startled awake, was summarily hanged by the revolutionary Ghent government. Vargas and De Roda managed to escape.

== Literature ==
- Charles-Albert de Behault, Le Compromis des nobles et le Conseil des troubles, Bulletin de l'Association de la Noblesse du Royaume de Belgique, avril 2023, n° 314, pp. 11–56
- "Vargas, Juan de – Spaans jurist en politicus – Madrid, 1517 – Spanje, 1575–1580 – Biografie". Nouvelle Biographie Nationale (in Dutch). Universiteit Leiden, Netherlands. 26 April 2010. Archived from the original on 17 July 2014.

== Sources ==
- (in French) Gachard, L.P. (1849) "Notice sur le Conseil des Troubles, institué par le duc d'Albe", in: Bulletins de l'Académie royale des sciences, des lettres et des beaux arts de Belgique. Tome XVI-Deuxieme Partie, pp. 50–78
