= Nicholas Damant =

Flemish magistrate and nobleman who served Philip II of Spain. (1531–1616)

Chancellor of Brabant
- In office 13 June 1585 – 17 July 1616
- Monarchs: Philip II of Spain, Albert VII, Archduke of Austria
- Preceded by: Didier van t'Sestich
- Succeeded by: Petrus Peckius the Younger

Personal details
- Born: c. 1531 Brussels, Duchy of Brabant, Habsburg Netherlands
- Died: 17 July 1616 Brussels, Duchy of Brabant, Habsburg Netherlands
- Resting place: Brussels minster
- Spouse: Barbara Brant

Nicholas Damant (c. 1531–1616) was a magistrate and statesman in the Habsburg Netherlands. He was born in Brussels around 1531, the son of Pierre Damant, a councillor and courtier to Charles V. His brother, Pieter Damant, became bishop of Ghent Nicholas graduated Licentiate of Laws and practised as a lawyer before being appointed to the Council of Brabant by the Duke of Alva on 7 May 1568. In 1578 he was among those who fled Brussels when it fell to the Dutch Revolt, and in 1584 he was among those whose moveable goods were seized and sold at public auction by the new regime. In 1582 he became councillor and master of requests of the Brussels Privy Council, then sitting in Tournai. On 7 April 1585 he was appointed to the Council of Flanders, over protests that as a native of the Duchy of Brabant he was unqualified, and on 13 June 1585 he was appointed Chancellor of Brabant. On 12 December 1587 he was appointed keeper of the seals of Philip II of Spain as ruler of the Low Countries. His wife, Barbara Brant, died in Madrid in 1591. Damant returned to the Low Countries and resumed his functions there in 1596. He died in Brussels on 17 July 1616 and was buried in Brussels minster.

Preceded by Didier van t'Sestich	Chancellor of Brabant; 1585 – 1616	Succeeded by Petrus Peckius the Younger
