= Petrus Peckius =

Petrus Peckius is the name of two jurists from the Low Countries, father and son, and so may refer to either:

- Councillor Petrus Peckius the Elder (1529 — 1589)
- Chancellor Petrus Peckius the Younger (1562 — 1625)
