= Guillaume-Philippe, Marquess of Herzelles =

Dutch magistrate and statesman (1642 - 1698)

Guillaume-Philippe, marquis d'Herzelles (1642–1698), baron of Werchin and Liedekerke, lord of Facuwez, was a magistrate and statesman in the Habsburg Netherlands.

== Life ==
Herzelles was born in Brussels on 22 December 1642, the son of Philippe d'Herzelles, a military commander, and of Barbe Maes, daughter of Jean Maes, a councillor in the Council of Brabant. He graduated Licentiate of Laws from Leuven University and on 20 October 1665 was admitted to the bar of the Council of Brabant. He was affiliated to the House of Sleeus among the Seven Noble Houses of Brussels, and in 1669 was elected an alderman of the city. He was appointed to the Council of Brabant by letters patent of 3 August 1673. In 1688, he was appointed to the Supreme Council of Flanders in Madrid, and on 6 October 1689 was made marquess of Harzelles by letters patent of Charles II of Spain. On 24 January 1690 he was appointed president of the Great Council of Mechelen, taking office on 20 June the same year. On 15 December, however, he was appointed Chancellor of Brabant in succession to Jean-Baptiste Christyn, and was sworn in by the States of Brabant on 29 January 1691. He was also appointed to the Council of State. Herzelles died on 10 October 1698 and was buried in the family vault at Ittre, near Nivelles.
