= Guillaume-Albert de Grysperre =

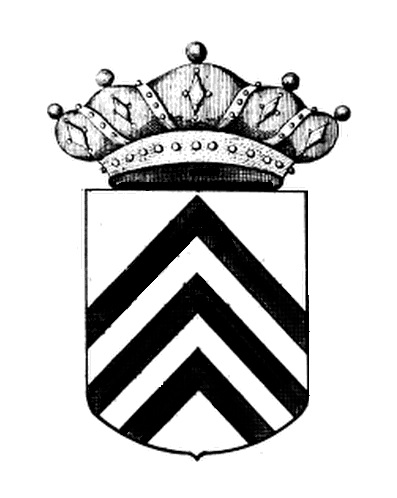
Crest of Grysperre

Guillaume-Albert de Grysperre, baron of Goyck and Libersart (1637–1725) was a Brabantine noble lord who was awarded the title of baron de Grysperre in 1691.

== Family ==
Grysperre was born in a minor branch of a noble family with a tradition of office-holding dating back to the 14th century. His father was Charles de Grysperre, knight, councillor and commissioner of finance, and his grandfather Guillaume de Grysperre had been a member of the Brussels Privy Council.

In 1688 he married Marie Snouckaert de Somerghem in Mechelen. After the death of his older brother Louis de Grysperre he became baron of Goyck and Libersart. He died without children in 1725.

== Career ==
In 1678 he was appointed to the Great Council of Mechelen, and in 1689 to the Supreme Council of Flanders. In 1690 he became President of the Great Council in succession to Guillaume-Philippe, Marquess of Herzelles. In 1698 he was named Chancellor of Brabant.

== Death ==
His wife died in 1716 and he died in 1725. He was buried together with his wife in Brussels Cathedral.

Government offices
Preceded by Guillaume-Philippe, Marquess of Herzelles	18th President of the Great Council; 1690–1699	Succeeded by Hyacinthe-Marie de Brouchoven
Preceded by Guillaume-Philippe, Marquess of Herzelles	Chancellor of Brabant	Succeeded by Honoré-Henri d'Eesbeecke, Viscount de Haeghen
