= Criminal ordinances of 1570 =

The criminal ordinances of 1570 (criminele ordonnantiën, ordonnances criminelles), issued in Brussels by the Duke of Alva on behalf of Philip II of Spain, were an attempt to codify and streamline procedure in criminal trials throughout the Habsburg Netherlands. The first and most substantial ordinance was issued on 5 July 1570, and was followed on 9 July by further ordinances regulating imprisonment and the rules on evidence.

The codification of criminal law was deliberated by government bodies, in particular the Council of State, Privy Council, and Council of Troubles. While primarily drafted by the Privy Council, the ordinances were revised by Italian and Spanish jurists on the Council of Troubles, who were familiar with Roman law but not with the laws of the Low Countries.

By overriding distinct provincial criminal practices and abolishing many exemptions and jurisdictional peculiarities, the ordinances were held to have infringed the existing privileges of the constituent principalities of the Habsburg Netherlands.

Although issued by royal authority, and suspended by the Pacification of Ghent in 1576, these ordinances continued to be regarded as a foundation of criminal jurisprudence in the Dutch Republic until almost the end of the 18th century.
