= Filip Willem van Steenhuys =

Lawyer; office-holder in the Spanish Netherlands

Chancellor of Brabant
- In office 23 January 1663 – 1 May 1668
- Monarchs: Philip IV of Spain; Charles II of Spain
- Preceded by: Robert van Asseliers
- Succeeded by: Simon Fierlants

Personal details
- Born: 27 September 1593 Mechelen, Spanish Netherlands
- Died: 1 May 1668 (aged 74) Brussels, Spanish Netherlands
- Parent: Willem van Steenhuys (father)

Filip Willem van Steenhuys or Filips Willem van Steenhuys (27 September 1593 – 1 May 1668), 1st baron of Poederlee and lord of Flers, Heerle, Gierle, Moerbeke, etc., was an office-holder in the Spanish Netherlands who served on the Great Council of Mechelen, the Council of Flanders, and the Privy Council of the Habsburg Netherlands.

== Family ==
Filip Willem van Steenhuys was born, in Mechelen on 27 September 1593, only son of Willem van Steenhuys. On 14 January 1636, he married Walburga Snoy, and became lord of Poederlee in his wife's right.

They had five children:

1. Jean-Érard de Steenhuys, 2nd Baron of Poederlee, Lord of Moorsele; married to Marie-Françoise van Achten.
2. Claire-Florence de Steenhuys; married to Pierre de eCroix, Lord of Wasquehal.
3. Anne de Steenhuys; married to Bernard de Steenhuys, Lord of Bekensteyn
4. Marie-Walburga de Steenhuys, married to Jean-Jacques Snoy
5. Marguerite de Steenhuys, married to Philippe-Henri de Steenhuys, Lord of Hernin.

== Career ==
He studied law and was called to the bar at the Great Council of Mechelen. In 1620 and 1622, he accompanied his father on diplomatic journeys to Germany. On 22 May 1623, he was named to the Council of Guelders, and on 9 August 1627, exchanged this position for one on the Great Council of Mechelen.

On 8 July 1648, he was appointed president of the Council of Flanders, but not having been born in the county of Flanders his appointment was not legally secure. On 17 January 1650, he returned to Brussels as a privy councillor. On 24 March 1653, he became a baron, and Poederlee a barony. On 23 April 1657, he was also appointed to the Admiralty Council.

He was invested as assistant chancellor of Brabant with right of succession to Robert van Asseliers, but because he had not been born in the duchy of Brabant this appointment too proved controversial, with the States of Brabant refusing to accept his oath of office. After Asseliers' death in 1661, it was not until 1663, that he was able to succeed him.

Van Steenhuys died in Brussels on 1 May 1668 and was buried in the Dominican church there.

== Sources ==
- Bril, L. (1924). "Steenhuys, Philippe-Guillaume de" (PDF). Biographie Nationale de Belgique (in French). Vol. 7. Académie Royale de Belgique. pp. 758–760. OCLC 256104854.
