= Jean-Antoine Locquet =

Chancellor of Brabant
- In office 15 August 1686 – 22 March 1687
- Monarch: Charles II of Spain
- Preceded by: Simon Fierlants
- Succeeded by: Jean-Baptiste Christyn

Personal details
- Born: Unknown date, c. 1615 Brussels, Duchy of Brabant, Spanish Netherlands
- Died: 22 March 1687 (aged 71–72) Brussels, Duchy of Brabant, Spanish Netherlands
- Spouse: Marie-Christine De Keyser
- Children: 1
- Education: University of Leuven

Jean-Antoine Locquet (c. 1615 – 22 March 1687), Lord of Impel, was a Brabantine lawyer who served as president of the Great Council of Mechelen and in 1681 became first viscount of Hombeke (Hombecque).

== Family ==
Locquet was born in Brussels, the son of Guillaume Locquet. He married Marie-Christine De Keyser, by whom he had a son and heir, Jean-Michel Locquet, 2nd Viscount of Hombeke.

== Career ==
Locquet studied law at Leuven University, and briefly taught philosophy there before being called to the bar. In 1658 he became a councillor in the Council of Brabant, and in 1661, of the Admiralty Council. From 1663 to 1669, he served on the Supreme Council of Flanders in Madrid. He became 15th president of the Great Council of Mechelen in 1669, in succession to Adrien de Noyelles.

In 1671, he bought the seigneury of Op-Hombeecq. In recognition of his loyal service he was created Viscount of Hombecque by Charles II of Spain on 20 September 1681. Shortly before his death he was named chancellor of Brabant. Jean-Antoine Locquet died in Brussels on 22 March 1687, and was buried in Hombeke.

== Bibliography ==
- Thomas, C. (2007). "Locquet, Jean-Antoine" (PDF). Nouvelle Biographie Nationale (in French). Vol. 9. Académie Royale des Sciences. pp. 244–245. OCLC 259947273.
- Vermeir, R. (2012). "Locquet, Jean-Antoine". Diccionario Biográfico Español (in Spanish). Vol. 30. Real Academia de la Historia. p. 165. OCLC 820528611.
