= Perpetual Edict =

Perpetual Edict may refer to:

- The Praetor's Edict in Roman Law, after the praetors began reissuing exactly the same edict as their predecessors, about 130 AD.
- Edict of 1577
- Perpetual Edict (1611)
- Perpetual Edict (1667)
