= Jean Scheyfve =

Chancellor of Brabant
- In office 17 February 1557 – 26 November 1579
- Monarch: Philip II of Spain
- Preceded by: Engelbert van den Daele
- Succeeded by: Didier van t'Sestich

Ambassador to England
- In office May 1550 – October 1553
- Monarch: Charles V, Holy Roman Emperor

Personal details
- Born: ca. 1515 Antwerp, Duchy of Brabant, Habsburg Netherlands
- Died: 13 July 1581 (aged 65–66) Antwerp, Duchy of Brabant, Habsburg Netherlands
- Resting place: Antwerp Cathedral
- Education: Leuven University

Jean or Jehan Scheyfve (c. 1515 – 13 July 1581), Lord of Sint-Agatha-Rode, was Chancellor of Brabant, head of the civilian administration of the Duchy of Brabant, from 1557 to 1579. He had earlier served as the ambassador of Charles V, Holy Roman Emperor, to the English court (May 1550 to October 1553).

== Early life ==
Jean was the son of Jean Scheyfve and Jeanne de Berchem. He studied at Leuven University, graduating doctor of law. In 1541-1542 he was an alderman of Antwerp, and in 1545 Burgomaster. In 1548 he was appointed to the Brussels Privy Council.

== Ambassador to England ==
Scheyfve was resident ambassador at the courts of Edward VI and Mary I of England. Scheyfve was sent to London before the departure of the previous ambassador, François van der Delft, in May 1550. London was not regarded as a good posting in the diplomatic community and he thought his mission would last only three months. His letters are mostly concerned with commercial issues and rarely say much of the doctrinal religious controversies in England, but he reported the difficulties Princess Mary encountered hearing the Catholic Mass, which was now proscribed in England.

=== Scheyfve and Princess Mary ===
Edward VI mentioned Scheyfve once in his journal, writing that the Imperial ambassador came to him on 5 September 1551, asking that his sister, the Princess Mary, should be allowed to attend the Mass and have her household officers restored to her. As the changes to Mary's household had happened so recently, Scheyfve's master Charles V could not have authorised him to make the request, so Scheyfve was refused. It was said that Edward VI was acting in his rights by English law, and Philip Hoby, the ambassador to the Emperor, had reported the understanding on the matter of the Mass was not as Scheyfve represented it.

After speaking to Princess Mary, Scheyfve sent a letter to Charles V on 12 September describing the incident in detail. Mary had felt compelled to dismiss her chaplains. On 5 September, Scheyfve had first addressed the Earl of Warwick who deferred to Edward VI in person, considering the King was now of age. Warwick and the Marquess of Northampton discussed his business with Edward while Scheyfve was not present, and then told him Edward thought he ought to be satisfied with the answer already given. Mary would not be allowed to hear the Mass with her ladies, and although Scheyfve said Nicholas Wotton and William Paget had made a promise otherwise to Charles V, they and Hoby denied this was possible. The three men from her household would not be reinstated. Scheyfve had to tell Mary not to practice the Catholic religion.

Mary's three household servants at Kenninghall in High Suffolk, mentioned by Scheyfve were a chaplain, Pooly and Lyonel. In July 1549 the English Privy council had heard that they were somehow involved in Kett's Rebellion nearby in Norfolk. Mary replied that it was a case of mistaken identities. Her chaplain, Dr Hopton and the Comptroller of her household had been summoned before the council in June over matters of religion.

=== The Princess Elizabeth ===
In November 1550, Scheyfve heard that Lord Warwick would divorce his wife and marry the Princess Elizabeth. When Scheyfve heard in January 1551 that the Venetian and French ambassadors had paid their respects to Elizabeth at court, he asked if he might do the same. The Treasurer and Admiral said they would ask, and consulted with Warwick. They told Scheyfve that Edward was busy with Elizabeth, so Scheyfve left the court, saying, "Some other time then."

In June 1551 he was told of a plan that she would marry the Duke of Enghien, the brother of Antoine de Bourbon. A portrait of Elizabeth had been hastily made and sent to France with Philip Hoby and Thomas Goodrich, Bishop of Ely. In July there were rumours Elizabeth would marry the Duke of Aumale brother of the Duke of Guise or the Prince of Denmark. In March 1552 he heard she refused to marry the recently widowed Earl of Pembroke, and he guessed the Duke of Northumberland was directing his suit.

=== News of Sebastian Cabot ===
Scheyfve wrote to Antoine Perrenot de Granvelle, Bishop of Arras on 10 April 1553, with news of a voyage planned by Sebastian Cabot. Three ships would sail north from Harwich by the "Frozen sea" to "Camchina." The plan was to trade English kersey cloth and velvet for spices. Scheyfve had spoken to Cabot and pointed out that China ought to be a possession of the Empire. Cabot replied that he would like to have an audience with Charles V regarding his future employment by the Empire. A month later Scheyfve found himself discussing this voyage with a Portuguese messenger.

Cabot did not sail with these ships himself, and continued to discuss employment with Charles V. An offer from Charles arrived on the day of Edward VI's death, which Scheyfve was therefore unable to refer to the English court. Later, as Cabot had a salary from the English crown, and was well-respected in England, Scheyfve and his colleague Simon Renard considered that detaching him from Mary's service might foster ill-will.

=== Edward's illness ===
Scheyfve's letters detail the progress of Edward VI's illness. On 12 May Scheyfve reported to his master that he had a tumour on the lung and broke out in ulcers. At the end of May, the King was wasting away daily and not expected to live. It was thought to be the same sickness that had killed his half-brother, the Duke of Richmond. In June, the people of London were told that he was better, but Scheyfve knew these rumours were not believed and the nobility were preparing for a struggle, and Mary's succession was in doubt. At court there were rumours that Edward had been poisoned, on the day that Princess Mary last visited him. Edward was shown to a crowd from a window at Greenwich Palace on 27 June.

On 4 July, Scheyfve heard of the will that made Lady Jane Grey his heir. Scheyfve was joined by three colleagues on 7 July and news of the death of Edward was certain. The Imperial ambassadors were officially informed of the King's death on 10 July by William Petre and William Cecil.

=== Queen Jane ===
The four Imperial ambassadors acted on behalf of Princess Mary's cousin, Charles V. While they waited to be informed who was now the monarch of England, by 10 July 1553 they had heard Princess Mary had been proclaimed Queen in Norfolk, news which had made Jane's mother, the Duchess of Suffolk, and the Duchess of Northumberland weep. They were wary of the Venetian ambassador, Giacomo Soranzo, who had tried to canvas Scheyfve's reaction to the news, and avoided communicating with Mary so as not to raise suspicions against her.

George Brooke, Lord Cobham, and John Mason told the ambassadors their mission had ended at Edward's death, but they argued it had not, referring particularly to the assurances of international friendship made by Andrew Dudley. They repeated this argument to Jane's Privy Council, and then were constrained to tell Cobham and Mason they would leave on 20 July, as insisting on remaining would have been suspicious. On 19 July Mary was proclaimed, to rejoicing in London, and Mason, now accompanied by the Earl of Shrewsbury, asked them to stay in London.

=== Queen Mary ===
Charles V recalled Scheyfve, whom he called the Master of Requests, and his colleague ambassadors, the Chevaliers Jean de Montmorency Sieur de Courriéres, and Jacques de Marnix Sieur de Tholouse, on 14 September 1553, nominating Simon Renard, the Lieutenant of Aumont, as their successor in England. Simon Renard had recently written to Antoine Perrenot de Granvelle, Bishop of Arras, noting Scheyfve's jealousy when Renard was spokesman and minute-taker for the four ambassadors during their audiences with Mary. Renard, not Scheyfve, was entrusted with sounding out Mary's marriage to Philip II of Spain.

== Later career ==
On his return from England Scheyfve resumed his duties as a privy councillor. He was appointed Chancellor of Brabant on 17 February 1557. During the Iconoclastic Fury of 1566, Calvinists seized power in 's-Hertogenbosch, one of the four chief cities of Brabant. Scheyfve attempted to negotiate with them, but for several weeks in March and April 1567 effectively became a hostage in the city. He did not support the Duke of Alva's response to the Dutch Revolt, and in 1576 backed the Pacification of Ghent as a basis for restoring peace to the Low Countries. With the failure of conciliation he retired as chancellor on 26 November 1579.

A collection of his letters on a controversy with Granvelle, who was now a Cardinal, was published in 1580. In 1575 he commissioned the sculptor Jacques Jonghelinck to make his portrait medallion, which shows him wearing a cuirass and mantle with the motto "danger." Jonghelinck also made a portrait medal for his literary opponent Granvelle. Jean Scheyfve died in Antwerp on 13 July 1581 and was buried in Antwerp Cathedral.

== Family ==
His coat-of-arms was gules with a gold chief charged with three black wolf heads. The same Scheyfve arms were painted on the Prado Adoration of Magi triptych by Hieronymus Bosch, which was commissioned by a Pieter Scheyfve of a previous generation.

Scheyfve married Genevieve van Hoogelande (died 10 June 1580). Their children included:

- Marguerite Scheyfve, married Christophe d'Assonleville (1528–1607), jurist and Master of Requests to the Privy Council of Brabant.
- Marie Scheyfve, married Simon de Longin
- Maximilian Scheyfve
- Edward Scheyfve

== Sources ==
- Responces de Messire Iehan Sceyfve Chevalier, Seigneur de Sainct Aechtenrode, Ottenborch, Nethene etc., iadis Chancellier du Brabant sur certaines lettres du Cardinal de Granvelle, Corneille de Bruyn, Antwerp (1580)
- De Beer, Joseph, Jean Scheyfve, bourgmestre d'Anvers, chancelier de Brabant et ses deux médailles, 1575, Antwerp (1950)
