= Simon de Fierlant =

Simon Fierlants

Chancellor of Brabant
- In office 1 May 1668 – 15 August 1686
- Monarch: Charles II of Spain
- Preceded by: Philippe de Steenhuys
- Succeeded by: Jean-Antoine Locquet

Personal details
- Born: Simon de Fierlant; Unknown date, c. 1602; Brussels, Duchy of Brabant, Spanish Netherlands
- Died: 15 August 1686 (aged 83–84); Brussels, Duchy of Brabant, Spanish Netherlands

Simon de Fierlant (c. 1602 – 15 August 1686), Lord of Bodegem, was a jurist and holder of high office in the Spanish Netherlands.

== Family ==
De Fierlant was born in 's-Hertogenbosch around 1602, the son of Martin Fierlants, royal receiver of domains, and Catherine van Eyck. In 1629 his family fled 's-Hertogenbosch when it fell to the Dutch. On 10 December 1642 he married Anne-Marie de Reynegom (1625–1681), daughter of Thierry, lord of Eeklo, the Prince-Bishop of Liège's agent at the Brussels court, and Claire-Régine Mechelman, lady of Buzet. Together they had eight children. Two of their sons also held public office: Philippe-Ignace, lord of Bodeghem and Eeklo, became a member of the Sovereign Council of Brabant, and François-Simon, baron Fierlant, alderman of Brussels.

== Career ==
De Fierlant graduated Licentiate of Laws from Leuven University and on 18 August 1627 was called to the bar at the Council of Brabant.

He was ennobled by letters patent of 16 April 1657, as lord of Heetvelde and Bodeghem, and on 25 April the same year was appointed councillor and master of requests of the Great Council of Mechelen, being sworn in on 4 May. In 1663 he was appointed to the Supreme Council of Flanders in Madrid, returning to Brussels in 1668 as Chancellor of Brabant, a post he held for the next 18 years. He died in Brussels on 15 August 1686.

== Works ==
- Christianissimi regis in Brabantiae ducatum praetentio refutata (Cologne, 1667)
- Tractatus de imperio ac dignitatibus (Cologne, 1675)
- Austriacae domus ac gentis dilucidum jus in Burgundiae ducatum (Cologne, 1680)

== Bibliography ==
- Delecourt, J. (1883). "Fierlant, Simon de" (PDF). Biographie Nationale de Belgique (in French). Vol. 7. Académie Royale de Belgique. pp. 56–60. OCLC 256104854.
- Vermeir, R. (2011). "Fierlant, Simón de". Diccionario Biográfico Español (in Spanish). Vol. 20. Real Academia de la Historia. p. 41. hdl:1854/LU-1978096. OCLC 820528611.
