= Guillaume de Grysperre =

16th century Belgian jurist

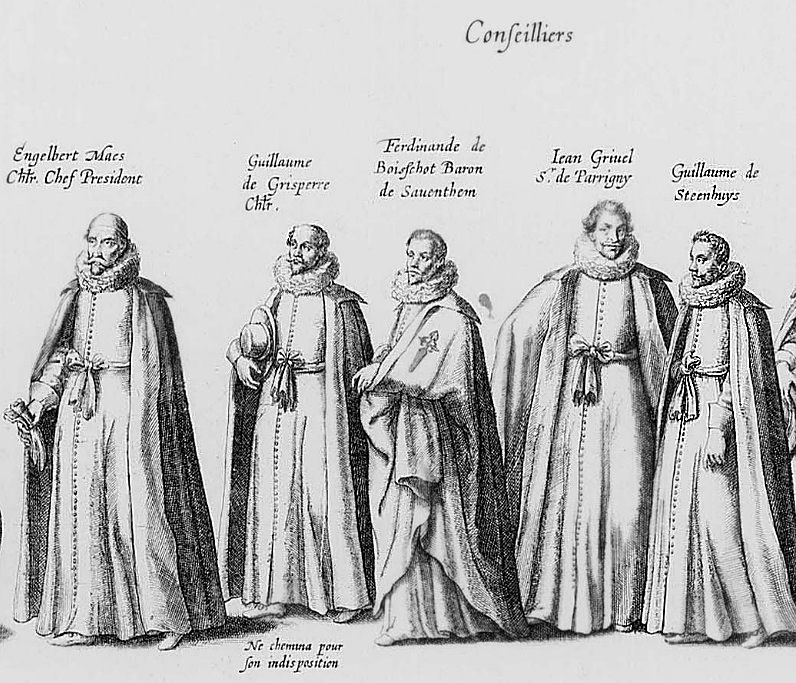
Guillaume de Grysperre depicted among the members of the Privy Council attending the funeral of Albert VII of Austria, even though he did not in fact take part in the cortège due to ill health

Guillaume de Grysperre (1543/4–1622) was a jurist who became a member of the Brussels Privy Council.

== Life ==
Grysperre was born in 1543 or 1544, the son of Severin de Grysperre, pensionary of the Liberty of Bruges. He studied law and himself became pensionary of Mechelen. In 1576 he was appointed to the Great Council of Mechelen (the highest law court in the Habsburg Netherlands), in 1598 to the Privy Council, and in 1614 to the Council of State.

His first wife, Lievine van der Meere, died on 28 November 1601; his second wife, Guillelmine van der Meere, outlived him. He died in Brussels on 17 April 1622 and was buried in Brussels minster alongside his first wife.

His son Charles became a councillor and commissioner of finance and married Jeanne-Marie van der Borcht. Their son, Guillaume-Albert de Grysperre, followed in his grandfather's footsteps as a government lawyer.
