= Albert de Coxie =

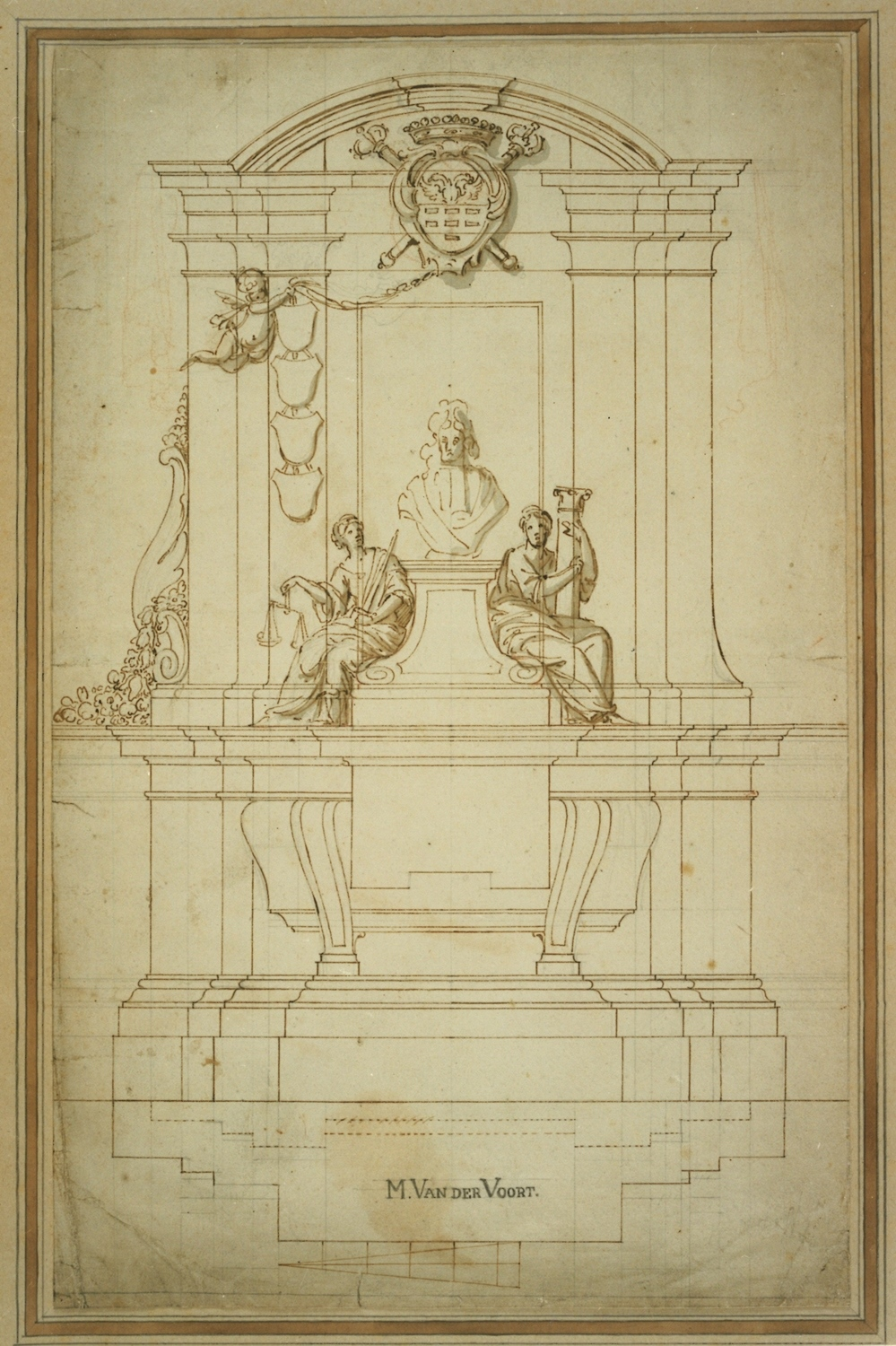

Albert de Coxie, baron of Moorseele, lord of Bouseval, la Tour, etc., was a jurist who became president of the Privy Council of the Habsburg Netherlands.

Coxie was born in Mechelen, where he was baptised on 8 May 1637. His father, Michel de Coxie (a great-grandson of Michiel Coxie), was a lawyer who became a member of the Great Council of Mechelen, and later of the Supreme Council of Flanders. His mother was Anne-Marie del Piano d'Avala.

On 23 March 1660 he too was appointed to the Great Council of Mechelen. On 3 February 1676 he transferred to the Privy Council, where he became commissioner for fiscal cases on 15 June 1684. He was appointed to the Council of State the same day. He served as president of the Privy Council from 12 November 1694 until Philip V's government reforms of 1702, when he retired. He came out of retirement in 1706 to be appointed president of the Council of State. He died in Brussels on 13 November 1709.
