= Theodoor van Tulden =

Theodoor van Tulden can refer to:

- Theodoor van Thulden, Dutch artist (1606–1669)
- Diodorus Tuldenus, Dutch legal scholar (died 1645)
