= Snoy =

Belgian noble family

Snoy Snoy et d'Oppuers
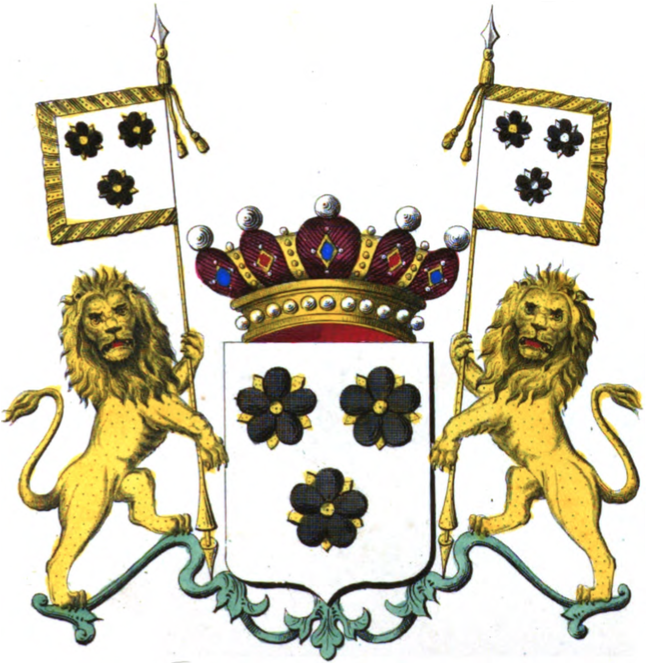
- Country: Spanish Netherlands Austrian Netherlands
- Titles: Lords of Oppuers; Lords of Poederlée
- Estate: Bois-Seigneur-Isaac Castle

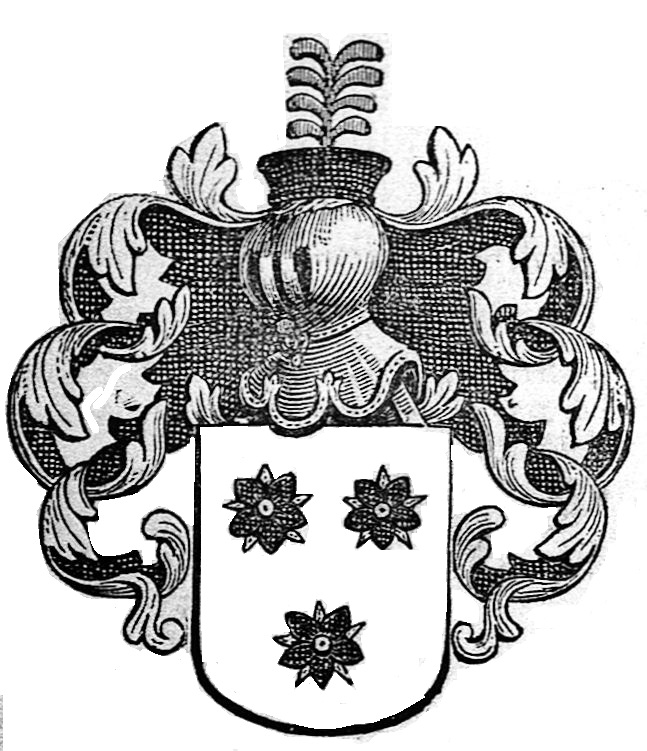
Arms of Philippe Snoy Lord of Oppuers

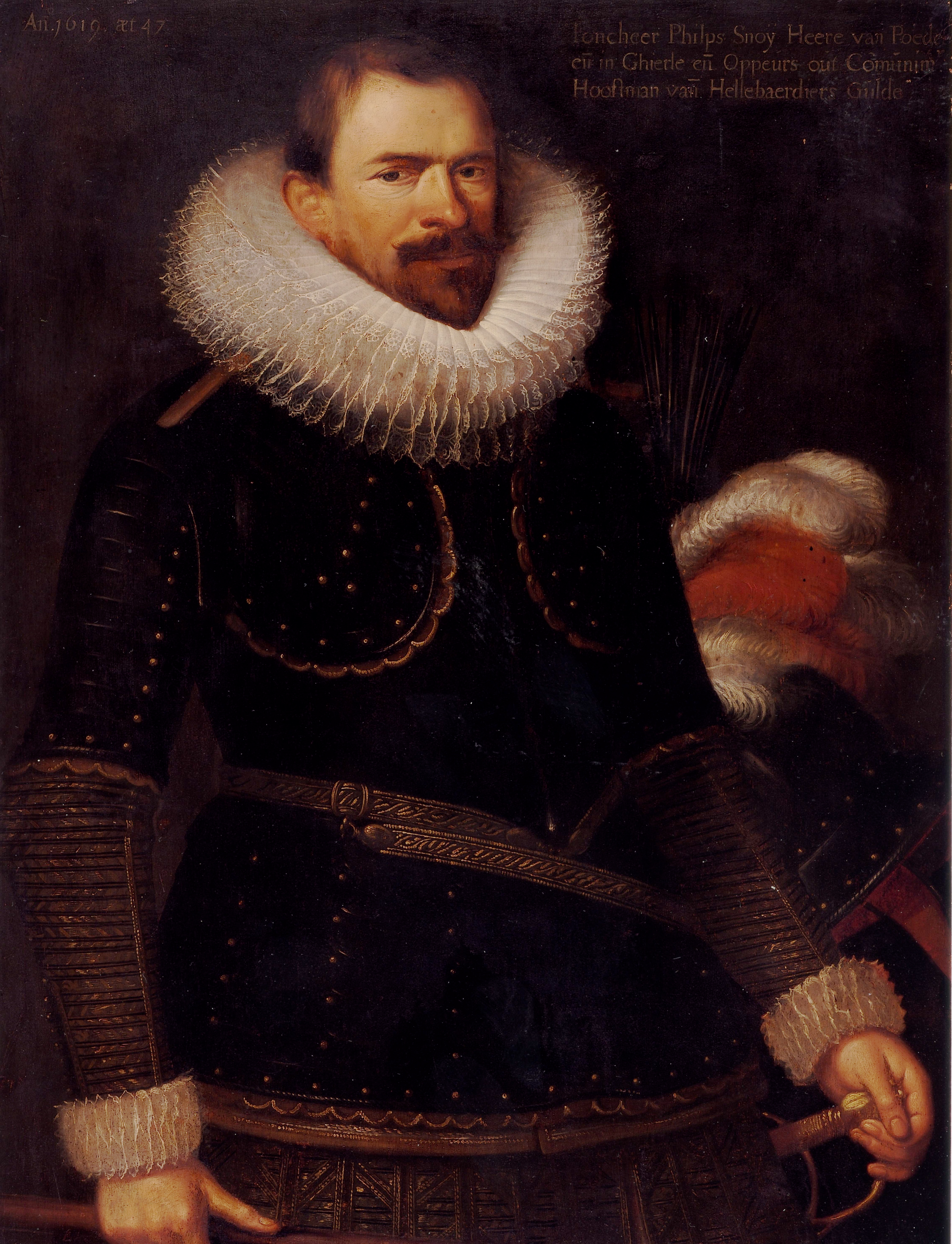
Philipp Snoy, Lord of Poederlee (1570–1637) became Lord of Oppuers and Mayor of Mechelen

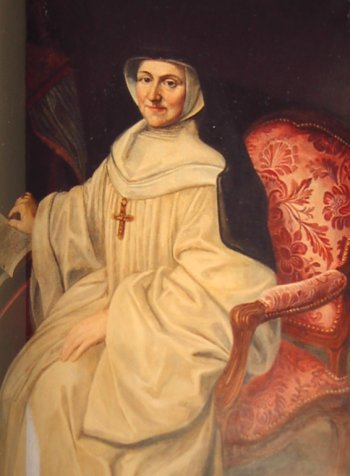
Marie-Alexandrine Snoy, abbess of la Cambre abbey

The Snoy family or Snoy d'Oppuers currently Snoy et d'Oppuers, is a Belgian noble family. The current descendants are titled Barons Snoy and of Oppuers.

Among the former residences of the family we find Château de Bois-Seigneur-Isaac, Meerbeek Castle and Befferhof Castle.

== Lord of Oppuers ==
The family was important for the history of the Heerlijkheid of Oppuers. For generations, they were Lord of Oppuurs and Poederlee. Joost Snoy became after his marriage the first Lord of Oppuers. Philipp's first marriage to the important house made him one of the most important lords of Mechelen. His daughter Walburga Snoy inherited from her mother, Marie of Brimeu, the seigneurie of Poyelles (Poederlee). During the 17th century, the family obtained political power and continued to intermarry with important houses.

Philipp vander Aa, Lord of Oppuers,
married to Claire de Barres

  - Walburga vander Aa, Lady of Oppuers:
    married to Joost Snoy, son of Lambert Snoy.
    - Philippe Snoy, Lord of Oppuers (1570–1637), knight.
      Married 1st Lady Marie de Brimeu, Lady of Poederlee; 2nd Marie vander Dilft.
      - Walburga Snoy (born 1607), Lady of Poederlee:
        married Philippe-Guillaume de Steenhuys.
      - Jean I Charles Snoy (1618–1689) Lord of Oppuers, Elsbroeck and Weert became 1st Baron of Oppuers:
        Married to Jacqueline de Steelandt.
        - Jean II Jacques Antoine Snoy, 2nd Baron of Oppuers;
          Married to Marie-Walburga de Steenhuys.
          - Charlotte-Marie-Florence Snoy:
            married to Charles-Philippe Hangouart, count of Avelin.
        - Jean III Charles Snoy, (1655–1714): Viscount of Horzeele and Lord of Weert;
          married to Claire Wynants
          - Jean IV Charles Snoy, married to Anna de Castro y Toledo.
          - Guillaume François Augustin Snoy; member of the Great Council of Mechelen:
            married to Dorothee Françoise de t' Sestich.
            - Philippe Ghislain Snoy, Baron d'Oppuers died 1825
              x Marie van der Gracht (1752-1832)
              - Idesbalde I Snoy d'Oppuers (1777–1840): Lord Chamberlain of King William III; Member of the Belgian Senate.
                x Joséphine Cornet de Grez (1785-1839).
                - Idesbalde II Snoy d'Oppuers (1819–1870), member of the provincial council of Brabant,
                  married to Marie-Julie Goethals; (1837-1909): Lady of the Countess of Flanders.
                  - Thierry Idesbald, Baron Snoy et d'Oppuers (1862–1930);
                    Member of the Belgian Senate, mayor.
                    married to Jacqueline de Pret Roose de Calesberg (1867-1900).
                    - Jean V Charles Snoy et d'Oppuers; Federal Minister of Belgium.
                - Alphonse Snoy et d'Oppuers (1820–1844).
                - Charles Snoy et d'Oppuers (1823–1908).
          - Marie-Alexandrine Snoy (dame Séraphine): Last abbess of La Cambre Abbey.

== Members ==
- Reinier Snoy, (1490–1534), doctor, humanist.
- Diederik Sonoy (1529–1597), a leader of the Geuzen.
- Baron Robert Snoy et d'Oppuers (1879–1946), président of the Compagnie Internationale des Wagons-Lits
- Thérèse Snoy et d'Oppuers, member of the Chamber of Representatives.
- Baron Bernard Snoy et d'Oppuers: President of the Association of Belgian nobility and president of the European ligue of international collaboration: Grand officer of the Order of Leopold.
