= Henri de Vicq, Lord of Meuleveldt =

Flemish ambassador

Henri IV de Vicq, Lord of Meuleveldt
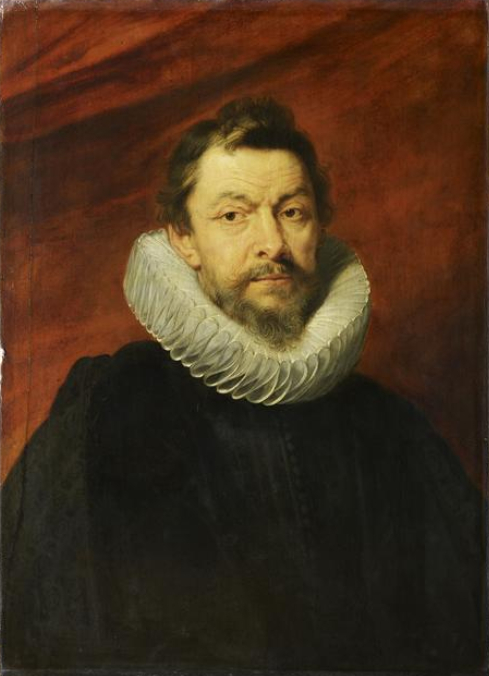
- Henri IV de Vicq, by Rubens

12th President of the Great Council of Mechelen
- In office March 12, 1638 – May 30, 1651
- Preceded by: Zeger Coulez
- Succeeded by: Antoine l'Hermite

Lord Mayor of the Brugse Vrije
- In office 1606–1608

Personal details
- Children: Philippe-Albert de Vicq, Lord of Meuleveldt

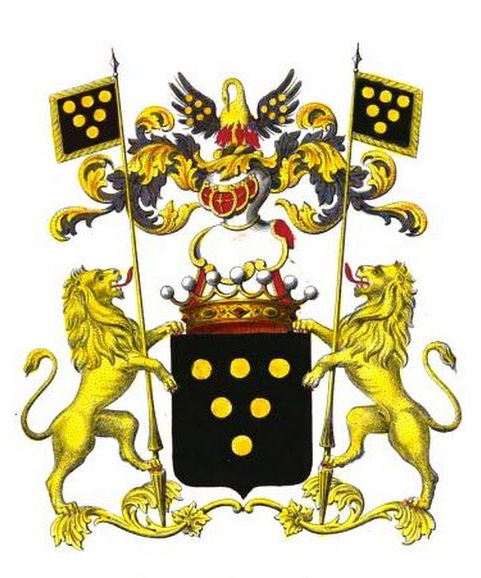
Coat of arms

Henri IV de Vicq, Lord of Meuleveldt (1573–1651), was a Flemish ambassador and became president of the Great Council of Mechelen

== Family ==
He was the youngest son of Henri III de Vicq and Maria Uphooghe, lady of Meuleveldt. His father belonged to a noble family of Flanders, and was a scholar known for his historic writings and opposition against the Calvinists. He was succeeded by his son Philippe-Albert; the House of Vicq, Barons of Cumptich, still exists in the 21st century.

The family resided in the 18th century in Groenhof Castle, Londerzeel.

Henri IV de Vicq, Lord of Meuleveldt;
Married to Hypolite de Male

  1. Philippe I de Vicq, Lord of Meulevelt;
    married Isabella de Palma - Carillo.
    1. Alphonse-Henri de Vicq, 1st Baron of Cumptich.
    2. Philippe II de Vicq, 2nd Baron of Cumptich;
      married to Madeleine de Cocq.
      1. François I de Vicq, 3rd Baron of Cumptich;
        married to Marie-Joseph Blondel, Baronnes of Meere.
        1. François II de Vicq, 4th Baron of Cumptich and Baron of Meere.
        2. Marie-Hypollite-Catherine de Vicq;
          married her cousin, Joseph-Mathieu d'Olmen.
        3. Hyppolite-Françoise de Vicq;
          Married to Eugene-Joseph d'Olmen, Baron of Poederlee;
          President of the Great Council of Mechelen in 1739.
          1. Philippe-Ambroise d'Olmen, Baron de Poederlé
    3. Ferdinand Auguste de Vicq
    4. Marie-Hypolite de Vicq;
      married to Jean-Florent d'Olmen; Lord of la Court-au-Bois.
      1. Ferdinand-Joseph d'Olmen
        1. Joseph-Mathieu d'Olmen,
          married to Marie de Vicq; daughter of the 3rd Baron of Cumptich.
  2. Charles de Vicq: royal councillor.
  3. Hippolyte de Vicq
  4. Eugène de Vicq; Canon in Bruges
  5. Aurelie-Augustin de Vicq; Canon in Ghent Cathedral

== Career ==
He was named special ambassador to the Archdukes Albrecht and Isabella. He was mayor of the Brugse Vrije several times. He was named member of the supreme Council in Madrid. After the death of Zeger Coulez in 1637 he was named President of the Great Council, and was succeeded by Antoine l'Hermite.

== Friend of Rubens ==
The Lord of Meuleveldt was colleague ambassador of Rubens and was told to play an important role for the completion of The History of Constantine. Henri de Vicq met Rubens in Paris, where he presented Rubens to the Queen Maria de Medici and advised her to take benefit of the talent of Rubens. The Queen followed the advice of de Vicq, and commanded Rubens to paint the Palais du Luxembourg in Paris. Rubens painted the portrait of the Lord of Meulenveldt in 1625 in recognition of his profound gratitude and friendship. Rubens was a personal guest of Henri de Vicq when he was in Paris for business and was welcome to take residence in the Hotel de Vicq. The fine portrait of Henri de Vicq is currently kept in the collection of the Louvre, and said to come From the Royal Dutch collections.

Government offices
Preceded by Zeger Coulez	12th President of the Great Council; 1637-1651	Succeeded by Antoine l'Hermite
