= Van Den Daele =

Van Den Daele is a Dutch surname. Notable people with the surname include:

- Engelbert van den Daele (1496–1556), Dutch politician
- Erwin Vandendaele (born 1945), Belgian footballer and manager
- Thierry Van Den Daele (born 1966), French tennis player
