= Louis-Alexander Scockart =

Louis-Alexander Scockart (1633–1708), count of Tirimont, was an officeholder and diplomat of the Spanish Netherlands, and signatory of the Treaty of Ryswick on behalf of Charles II of Spain.

== Life ==
Scockart was born in Mons, in the county of Hainaut, on 29 August 1633. He studied law at Leuven University and entered a career in public administration, eventually sitting on the Council of Finance, the Supreme Council of Flanders in Madrid, the Privy Council in Brussels, and being appointed treasurer of the royal domains in the Low Countries. He was ennobled in 1668, knighted in 1672, and awarded the title count of Tirimont in 1690.

In 1697 Scockart was appointed ambassador plenipotentiary of Charles II for the negotiation of the Treaty of Ryswick, which concluded the Nine Years' War. He remained involved in negotiations about the treaty's implementation until the end of 1699. He died in Brussels on 8 May 1708 and was buried in the minster (now Brussels Cathedral) with a white marble tomb.
