= Frans I van Kinschot =

François de Kinschot
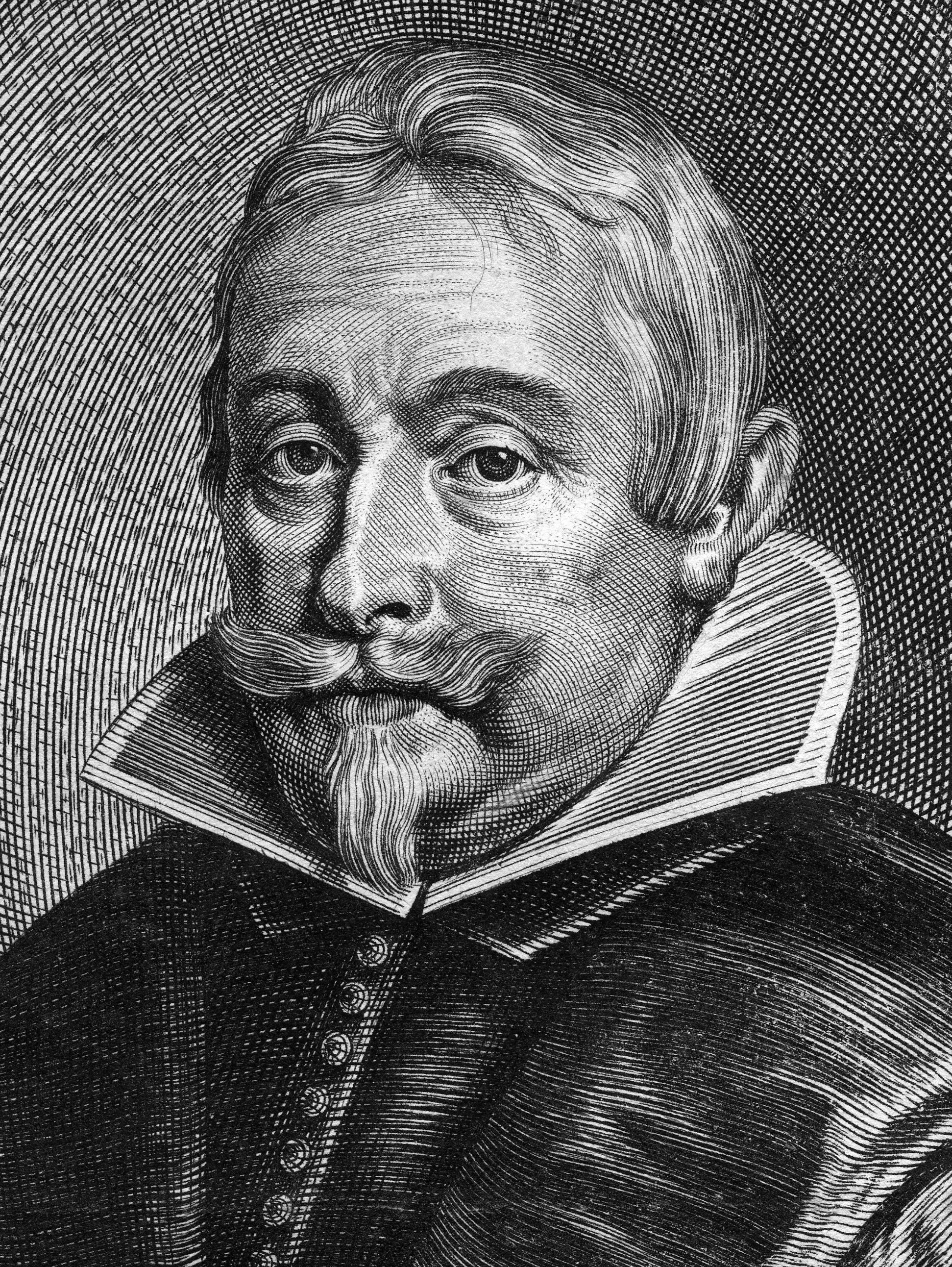

Chancellor of Brabant
- In office 24 November 1649 – 5 May 1651
- Monarch: Philip IV of Spain
- Preceded by: Ferdinand van Boisschot
- Succeeded by: Robert van Asseliers

Personal details
- Born: Franciscus Henri van Kinschot; 1 May 1577 City of Brussels
- Died: 5 May 1651 (aged 74) Brussels
- Resting place: Cathedral of St. Michael and St. Gudula
- Education: University of Douai
- Orders: Order of Santiago

Frans I van Kinschot (1 May 1577 – 5 May 1651), Lord of Rivieren, Jette, Ganshoren, was a jurist and chancellor of Brabant.

== Biography ==
Van Kinschot was the son of councillor Hendrik van Kinschot and Margaretha Douglas dite Scott. He was a descendant of the van Kinschot family. He attended secondary school at the College of Ath, in Hainaut, a renowned college in the Habsburg Netherlands. He then studied law at the University of Douai, where he graduated at the age of 18. He joined the law practice of his father, who was a lawyer at the Council of Brabant. Van Kinschot married Margareta Boote, daughter of Adriaen Boote, and in 1630, succeeded his father-in-law as treasurer general and chief of finance to Albert VII, Archduke of Austria.

Under Philip IV of Spain, he was appointed a member of the Council of State and a knight of the Order of Santiago. In 1649 he succeeded Ferdinand van Boisschot as Chancellor of Brabant. He died in 1651.
