= Jean-Baptiste Christyn =

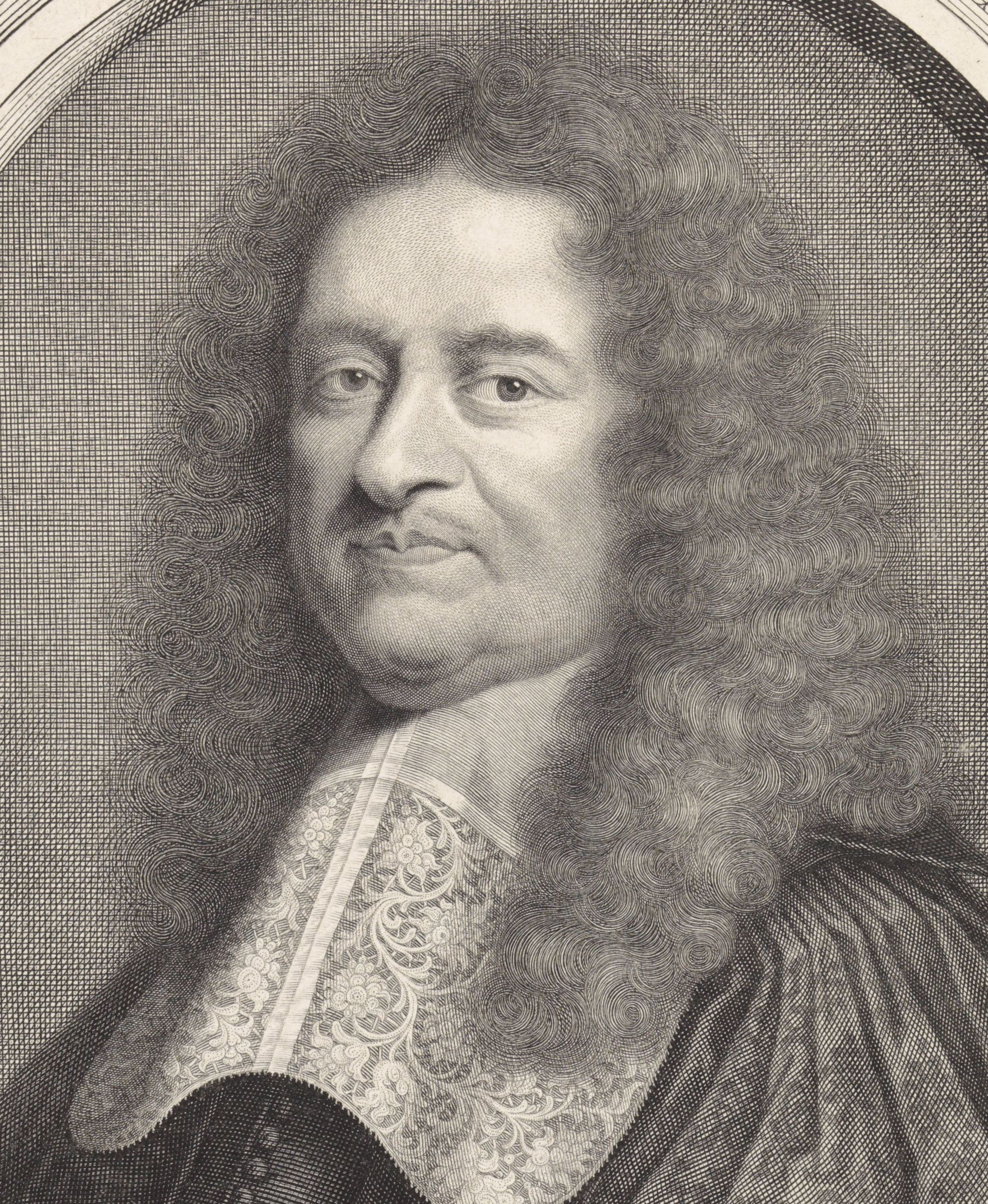
- Jan Baptist Christyn, engraving by Pieter van Schuppen

Chancellor of Brabant
- In office 22 March 1687 – 25 October 1690
- Monarch: Charles II of Spain
- Preceded by: Jean-Antoine Locquet
- Succeeded by: Guillaume-Philippe de Herzelles

Personal details
- Born: Johannes Baptista Christyn; 22 February 1630 Brussels, Duchy of Brabant, Spanish Netherlands
- Died: 25 October 1690 (aged 60) Brussels, Duchy of Brabant, Spanish Netherlands
- Relatives: Jan Baptist Christyn the Younger (nephew)
- Education: University of Leuven; University of Douai

Jan Baptist Christyn the Elder or Joannes Baptista Christyn the Elder (22 February 1630 – 25 October 1690), 1st baron of Meerbeek, was a jurist, a diplomat in the Spanish Netherlands, and Chancellor of Brabant from 1687 to 1690. He was regarded as the Flemish authority on all matters relating to the aristocracy.

== Early life ==
Christyn was born in Brussels in 1622, the son of Pieter Christyn and Maria van den Hove. He was educated at the Augustine college in Brussels and at the University of Douai, graduating as a Licentiate in both civil and church law in 1651.

== Career ==
Christyn practiced as a lawyer before the Council of Brabant. Between 1660 and 1667, he worked as assessor to the Drossard of Brabant. Christyn was appointed master of requests to the Great Council of Mechelen in 1667, and privy councillor in 1671.

In 1675 he was called to Madrid to serve on the Royal and High Councils of the Netherlands and Burgundy. He was one of the envoys of King Charles II of Spain at the Congress of Nijmegen in 1678. Implementation of the treaties was very difficult and led to follow-up negotiations in Cambrai in 1681. Against the expansionist claims of the French king Louis XIV, Christyn published La Flandre défendue des fausses prétentions de la France (Flanders defended against France's false claims) in 1684. He believed he had an ex officio seat on the Brussels Council of State, but the pro-French chief president Leo-Jan de Pape refused it in order to block all claims to priority from the Madrid body.

In 1685 Christyn was appointed first intendant of the High Military Council. Two years later, the lordship of Meerbeek, which he had purchased and was elevated to a barony. In 1687, Christyn was appointed Chancellor of Brabant, the highest position in the civilian administration of the duchy of Brabant.

Christyn died in Brussels on 25 October 1690, and was buried in the Augustinian church.

== Family ==
Christyn married Catharina de Pretere on 7 June 1652 in Brussels. They had a son called Johannes Baptista Clemens Christyn. Other well-known relatives were his brother Libertus Franciscus Christyn and his cousin and godson Jan Baptist Christyn the Younger.

== Publications ==
Christyn wrote a number of works on jurisprudence, genealogy and heraldry. Les délices des Pays-Bas: ou Description géographique et historique des XVII. provinces belgiques, a historical chorography of the Low Countries that was published after his death, has been attributed to him, but also to his nephew, Jan Baptist Christyn the Younger.

== Selected publications ==
Christyn's works include:

- Placcaeten ende Ordonnantien van de Hertoghen van Brabandt, vol. 3, 1664 en vermoedelijk ook vol. 4, 1677 (voortzetting van Antonius Anselmo)
- Jvrisprvdentia heroica sive De jure Belgarum circa nobilitatem et insignia demonstrato in commentario ad edictum serenissimorum Belgii principum Alberti et Isabellæ emulgatum 14. decembris 1616, 1668
- Les tombeaux des hommes illustres qui ont paru au Conseil Privé du Roy Catholique, 1674 (attributed)
- Observationes eugeniales et heroicae, 1678 (attributed)
- La Flandre défendue des fausses prétentions de la France, ou le conseiller Dupuy, historien français, pris dans ses propres filets, 1684
- Les delices des Païs-Bas, contenant une Description générale des XVII provinces, 1711 (possibly)
