= Willem van Steenhuys =

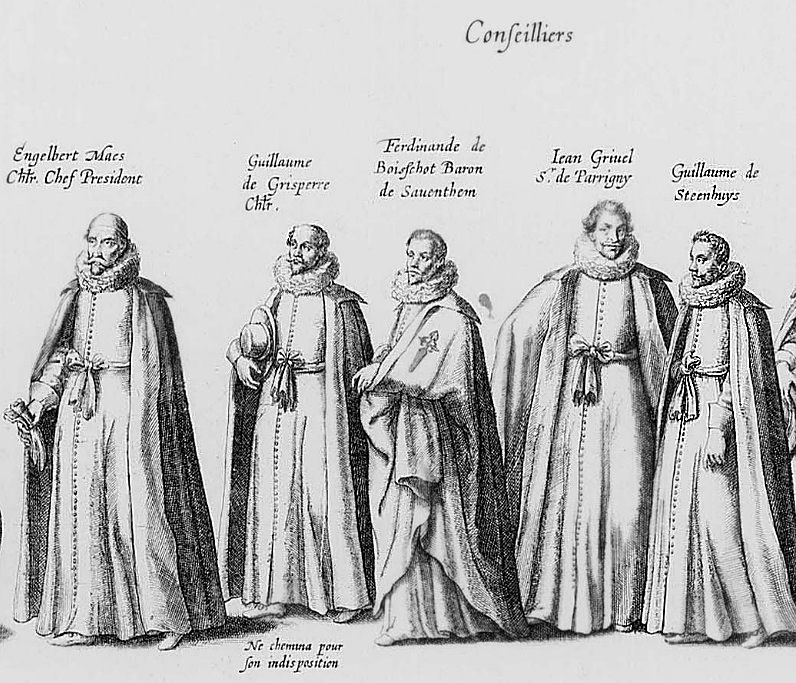
- Privy councillors in the funeral cortege of Archduke Albert (1622), Steenhuys at far right

councillor of the Great Council of Mechelen
- In office 1601–1638
- Monarchs: Albert VII, Archduke of Austria (1598–1621); Philip IV of Spain (1621–1665)
- Governors General: Isabella Clara Eugenia (1621–1633); Cardinal-Infante Ferdinand of Austria (1633–1641)

Personal details
- Born: October 8, 1558 Lannoy
- Died: April 30, 1638 (aged 79) Brussels
- Resting place: Dominican church, Brussels
- Spouse: Margaretha van Cottignies
- Children: Filip Willem van Steenhuys
- Parent: Jan van Steenhuys
- Education: civil law

Willem van Steenhuys, Lord of Flers (1558–1638) was a noble magistrate and diplomat in the Spanish Netherlands.

== Family ==
Van Steenhuys was born at Lannoy on 8 October 1558, son of Jan van Steenhuys, Lord of Linghen, and Charlotte Preys.

In 1591 he married Margaretha (Marguerite) van (de) Cottignies, daughter of Lancelot, Lord of The Hague. They had the following children:

- Maria van Steenhuys; married to Filip van Spanghen, Lord of Ter Liest.
- Filip Willem van Steenhuys, who succeeded his father and became Baron of Poederlee; further descendants.
- Karel van Steenhuys, jurist

== Career ==
He obtained the degree of licentiate in law and on 7 June 1601 he was appointed a councillor of the Great Council of Mechelen, on 3 May 1611 councillor and master of requests of the Brussels Privy Council, and in 1613 commissioner in fiscal cases. He was an important advisor on monetary law.

In June 1617 and January 1619 he travelled to Antwerp and Leuven to investigate the publication of Corona Regia, a scandalous libel of James VI and I. In 1618–1619 he undertook a mission to the King of France, and in 1620 to Ambrogio Spinola in the Rhine Palatinate. On 8 May 1622 he was appointed to the Council of State and in October of the same year he was discharged as a privy councillor and despatched to assist the Spanish delegation at the Diet of Regensburg (1623). The same year he was knighted.

He returned to Brussels in April 1623. On 1 January 1627 he was appointed to the Admiralty council.

Van Steenhuys died in Brussels on 30 April 1638 and was buried in the Dominican church.
