= List of lords of Poederlée =

The Lords of Poederlee held a heerlijkheid (lordship) in Lille, Belgium, which in the 17th century became a barony.

== Lords of Poederlee ==
1. Jean of Vriessele, Lord of Poederlee: married Margaretha van Haesbroeck.
2. Gauthier of Vriessele, Lord of Poederlee, since 1433.
3. Peter de Brimeu: married Magdalene of Vriessele, Lady of Poederlee
4. Jacques de Brimeu, Lord of Poederlee: married Anna van de Werve, daughter of Martin.
5. Jean de Brimeu, Lord of Poederlee: married Clara of Thuyl.
6. Eleonora or Florentia de Brimeu, Lady of Poederlee: married Philip Snoy, Lord of Oppuers
7. Philippe Snoy, Lord of Oppuers (1570–1637), knight. Married 1st Lady Marie de Brimeu, Lady of Poederlee.

== Barons of Poederlé ==
1. Walburga Snoy, lady of Poederlee: married Philippe-Guillaume de Steenhuys, 1st Baron of Poederlee, in 1653. He was president of the Council of Flanders.
2. Jean-Erard de Steenhuys, 2nd Baron of Poederlee.
3. Marie Hélène de Steenhuys, 3rd Baron of Poederlee, married Eugène I d'Olmen. He would become the President of the Great Council of Mechelen in 1739.
4. Philippe I d'Olmen, Baron of Poederlee
5. Eugène II d'Olmen, Baron de Poederlé: Married Hyppolite-Françoise de Vicq, great-grand daughter of Henri de Vicq, Lord of Meuleveldt.
6. Philippe II d'Olmen, Baron de Poederlé
7. Hypolitte-Ernest d'Olmen, Baron de Poederlé
8. Sélon d'Olmen was the last baron of Poederlé (1836–1898); he married Valentine de Jonghe d'Ardoye (1845–1896), but had no male heirs.
