= Willem Van der Tanerijen =

Willem Van der Tanerijen (died 1499) was a jurist in the Duchy of Brabant (the territory of which is now divided between the Netherlands and Belgium) whose manuscript treatise on the procedures of the major courts of the duchy is an important source for the legal history of the fifteenth century. He was also a proponent of university training in law.

== Life ==
Sources on Van der Tanerijen's life are scarce. He was probably born in Antwerp, where he later served as an alderman. He was appointed to the Council of Brabant and later as master of requests of the Great Council of Mary of Burgundy.

== Writings ==
- Boeck van der loopender practijken der raidtcameren van Brabant, edited by E. I. Strubbe, 2 vols. (Brussels, Commission royale pour la publication des anciennes lois et ordonnances de la Belgique, 1952).
