= Diederik Sonoy =

Dutch military leader (1529–1597)

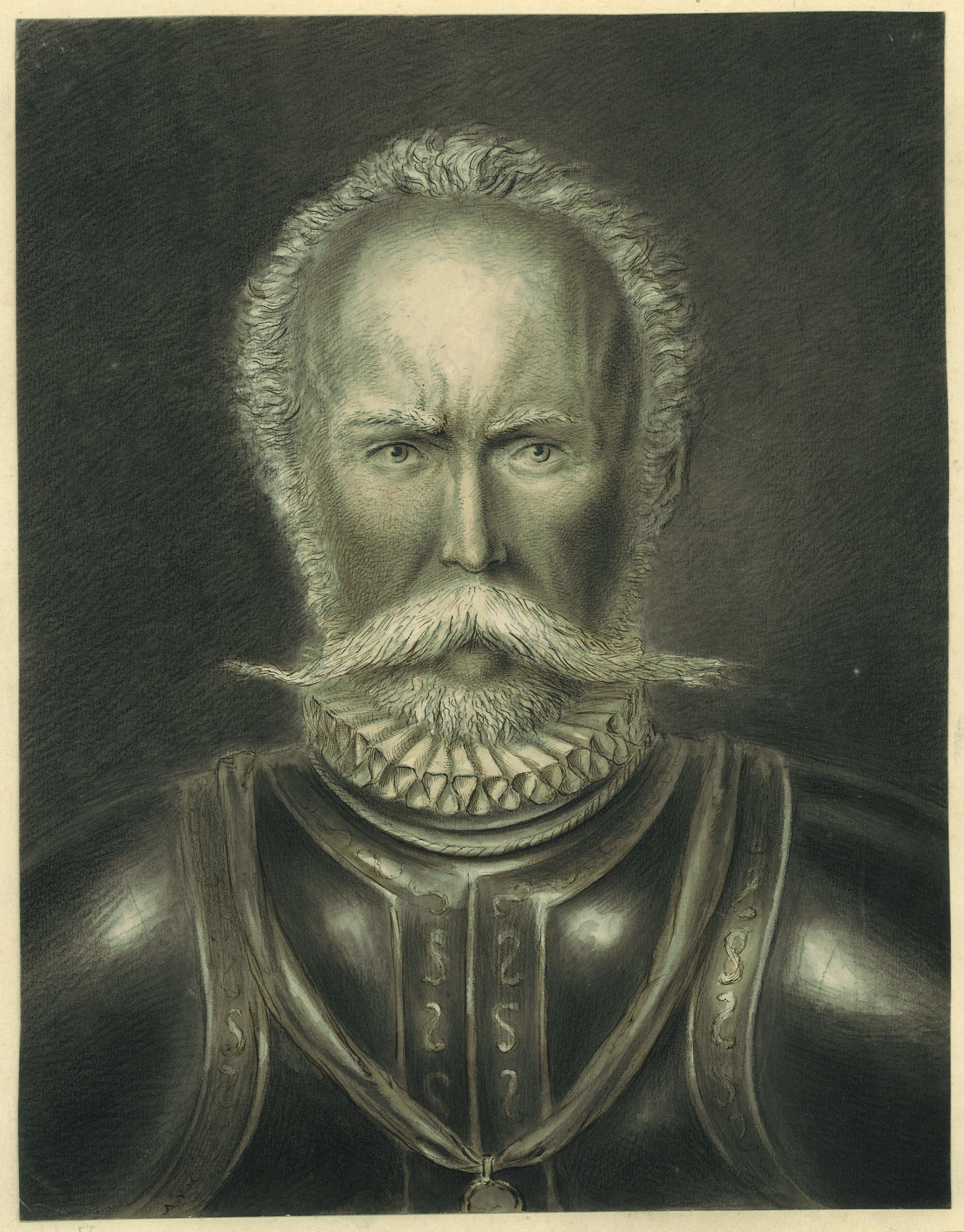
- Born: 1529; Kalkar, Duchy of Cleves
- Died: 2 June 1597 (aged 67–68) Pieterburen, Dutch Republic
- Conflicts: Eighty Years' War

Diederik Sonoy or Snoey (1529 – 2 June 1597) was a leader of the Geuzen during the Eighty Years' War.

== Biography ==
Diderick Sonoy was born about 1529 in the Duchy of Cleves. He was a son of Lambert Snoy and Emma Pauw van Derthuysen. He resided mostly in Holland and especially at the Hague, where he evinced great zeal for the reformation. He early entered military life, signed the compromise of Nobles, and was one of the most fierce advocates of the interests of the Prince of Orange. He gained the first naval victory over the Spanish fleet in July 1568. On 2 June 1572 he arrived at Enkhuizen. He was provided by William the Silent with a commission, appointing him Lieutenant-Governor of North Holland or Waterland. Troops under his command put both Egmond Castle and Egmond Abbey on fire in 1573. The destruction of these strategic locations prevented that the Spanish army could occupy them.

When he was discharged and received a pension he and his family crossed over to England, where he endeavoured to drain some land granted him by Elizabeth I; but failing he returned (1593) to East Frisia, resided for some time at Norden, and died 2 June 1597 on his seat near Pieterburen.

Sonoy was a narrow-minded religious fanatic and a furious persecutor of Catholics. After the Geuzen captured Alkmaar, they took prisoners five friars from the Franciscan monastery outside the city. Sonoy ordered them to be brought to Enkhuizen and had them hanged (martyrs of Alkmaar). Engelbert Terburg, a lay brother of the same monastery, was transferred by Sonoy to the village of Ransdorp, near Amsterdam, where he was hanged on 11 August 1572 after being subjected to torture.

== See also ==
- Snoy
