= Gilain de Sart =

Ghislain or Gilain de Sart (1379–1444) was Chancellor of Brabant from 1429 to 1431, effectively ruling the Duchy of Brabant for some months in 1430.

== Life ==
Gilain was born in Sart, Brabant, in 1379. In 1396 he matriculated at the University of Cologne. In 1408 he was appointed to a prebend of Saint Lambert's Cathedral, Liège, and in 1411 to a canonry in the Royal Church of St Mary in Aachen. He also briefly became attached to the household of Pierre d'Ailly. A career ecclesiastic, although only in minor orders, he amassed a number of clerical livings, including a canonry of the Church of St. Denis in Liège. When John of Walenrode, Prince-Bishop of Liège, died in 1419, de Sart acquired his private library.

Under Walenrode's successor, John of Heinsberg, de Sart was appointed chancellor of the prince-bishopric. In 1428 he was also appointed to the council of Philip I, Duke of Brabant, and in 1429 Chancellor of Brabant, resigning the chancellorship of Liège. At Philip's death without immediate heir, the government devolved upon de Sart until the succession was settled. The new duke, Philip the Good, relieved de Sart not only of the regency but also of the chancellorship, reinstating his rival Joannes Bont.

In 1433 De Sart matriculated at the University of Leuven, where the Faculty of Theology had just opened. By 1437 he was living in retirement in Liège.

In 1442 he was present in the entourage of John of Heinsberg at the coronation in Aachen of Frederick III as King of the Romans. As a canon of the Royal Church of St Mary it was he who heard the emperor's confession before the beginning of the ceremony.

He died in Liège on 16 June 1444.

Preceded by Joannes Bont	Chancellor of Brabant; 1429 – 1431	Succeeded by Joannes Bont
