= Château de Bois-Seigneur-Isaac =

Stately home in Wallonia, Belgium

Coordinates: 50.643°N 4.323°E

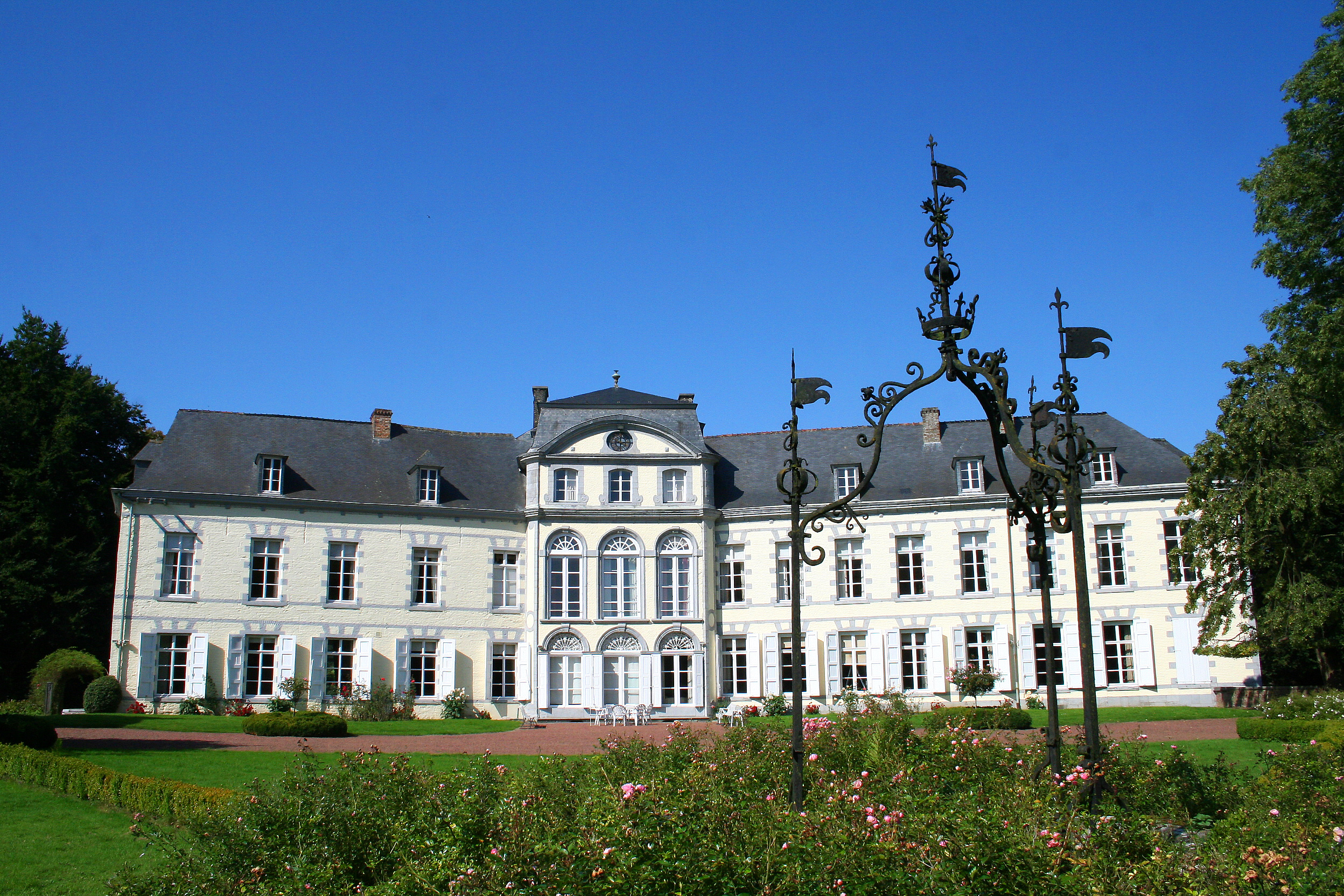
Bois-Seigneur-Isaac Castle

Bois-Seigneur-Isaac Castle (French: Château de Bois-Seigneur-Isaac) is a stately home in Ophain-Bois-Seigneur-Isaac, Wallonia, part of the commune of Braine-l'Alleud, Walloon Brabant, Belgium. The present building dates from 1737, but the site is substantially older.

Associated with the House of Snoy, the château's notable residents include the diplomat Jean-Charles Snoy et d'Oppuers (1907–91),

== See also ==
- List of castles in Belgium

== Sources ==
- BelgianCastles.be: Bois-Seigneur-Isaac
