= Engelbert van den Daele =

Chancellor of Brabant from 1541 to 1556

Chancellor of Brabant
- In office 26 August 1541 – 21 December 1556
- Monarch: Charles V, Holy Roman Emperor
- Preceded by: Adolph Van der Noot
- Succeeded by: Jean Scheyfve

Personal details
- Born: 1496 Mechelen, Lordship of Mechelen, Burgundian Netherlands
- Died: 21 December 1556 (aged 59–60) Brussels, Duchy of Brabant, Habsburg Netherlands
- Resting place: Brussels Cathedral
- Education: Leuven University

Engelbert van den Daele (1496–1556) was chancellor of Brabant, lord of Leefdael and Wilderen.

== Life ==
Van den Daele was born to a patrician family in Mechelen in 1496. After graduating doctor of law from Leuven University he was, on 17 January 1540, appointed to the Great Council of Mechelen. On 18 October 1540, Charles V appointed him chancellor of Brabant in succession to Adolph Van der Noot. The States of Brabant initially objected to the appointment on the basis of the Charter of Liberties of Brabant specifying that only Brabanters could hold such office. Van den Daele countered that those holding a barony in Brabant were accounted Brabanters, and he had been awarded the lordship of Leefdael two weeks prior to his appointment. He was sworn in on 26 August 1541.

In October 1541 he took part in negotiations for the marriage between Christina of Denmark and Francis I, Duke of Lorraine.

His first wife was Marie Ruffault, daughter of Jean Ruffault, knight, lord of Neufville and treasurer general of finance. His second wife was Françoise de Sauvage, daughter of the chancellor of Burgundy. He died in Brussels on 21 December 1556. He and his second wife were buried in Brussels Minster.
