= Council of Finances of the Habsburg Netherlands =

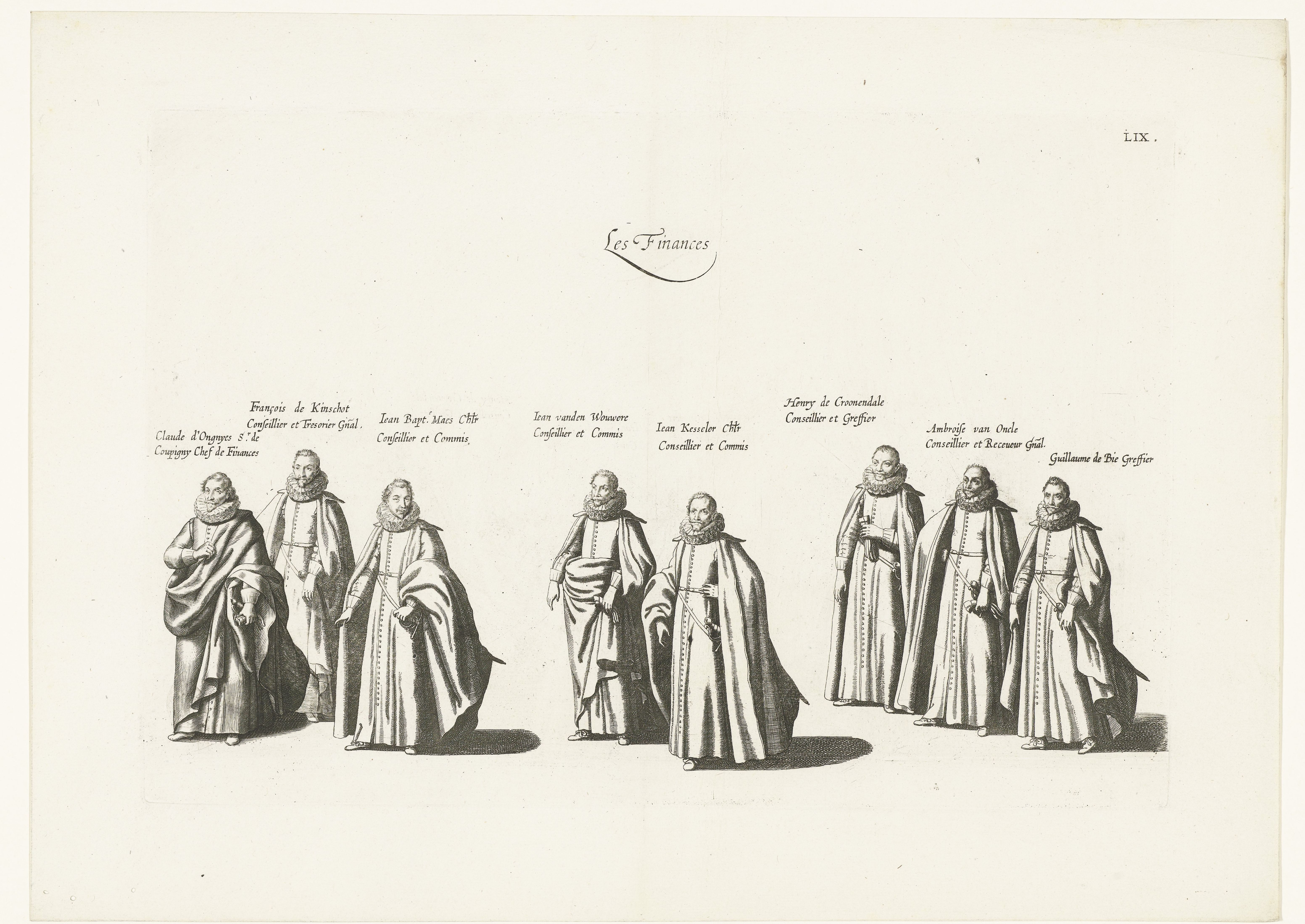
Members of the Council of Finances in the funeral procession of Archduke Albert (1622)

The Council of Finances (Raad van Financiën / Conseil des Finances) was one of the central government institutions of the Habsburg Netherlands. It was founded by Emperor Charles V by a decree of 1 October 1531 establishing three "collateral councils", the others being the Council of State and the Privy Council.

The main members were the Treasurer General and the Receiver General, supported by anywhere between two and five councillors.
