= Antonius Anselmo =

Antonio Anselmo (1589–1668) was a jurist in the Spanish Netherlands.

== Life ==
Anselmo was born in Hamburg to a family originally from the Duchy of Limburg. He studied at Leuven University, graduating licentiate of both laws. He was registered as a citizen of Antwerp on 8 April 1616. On 22 March 1617 he married Adrienne Voets, with whom he would have seven children. He practised as a lawyer in Antwerp, and became an important legal commentator. In 1645 was elected an alderman of the city, and over the ensuing years he held a number of important offices in city government.

Anselmo died on 16 November 1668 and was buried at Hoboken.

== Writings ==
- Placcaeten, ordonnantien, landt-chartres, blyde-Incomsten, Privilegien, ende instruction by de princen van dese Nederlanden, aen de inghesetenen van Brabant, Vlaenderen ende andere provincien, t'sedert 't jaer MCCXX tot den jaere MDCXL, wtghegeven, gheaccordeert ende verleent, 2 vols (Antwerp, Hendrik Aertssens, 1648)
- Codex Belgicus, seu jus edictale a principibus Belgarum sancitum, ofte de nederlandtsche, nieuwe soo gheestelycke als wereltlycke rechten, ghetrocken uyt de vier placcaet-boecken tot Gendt ende Antwerpen uytghegeven, (Antwerp, Petrus Bellerus, 1648); second edition 1661.
- Commentaria ad Perpetuum Edictum serenissimorum Belgii principum Alberti et Isabellae vulgatum. 12 julii MDCXI, second edition (Antwerp, Petrus Bellerus, 1661), a commentary on the Perpetual Edict (1611); second edition 1664; third edition 1701
- Tribonianus Belgicus, sive dissertationes forenses, ad Belgarum principum edicta (Brussels, Balthasar Vivien, 1663)
- Consultissimi domini Antonii Anselmo, consultationes seu resolutiones et advisamenta diurna (Antwerp, Petrus Bellerus, 1671), a posthumous collection of Anselmo's legal advice in response to specific consultations
