= Petrus Peckius the Elder =

Dutch jurist

Petrus Peckius
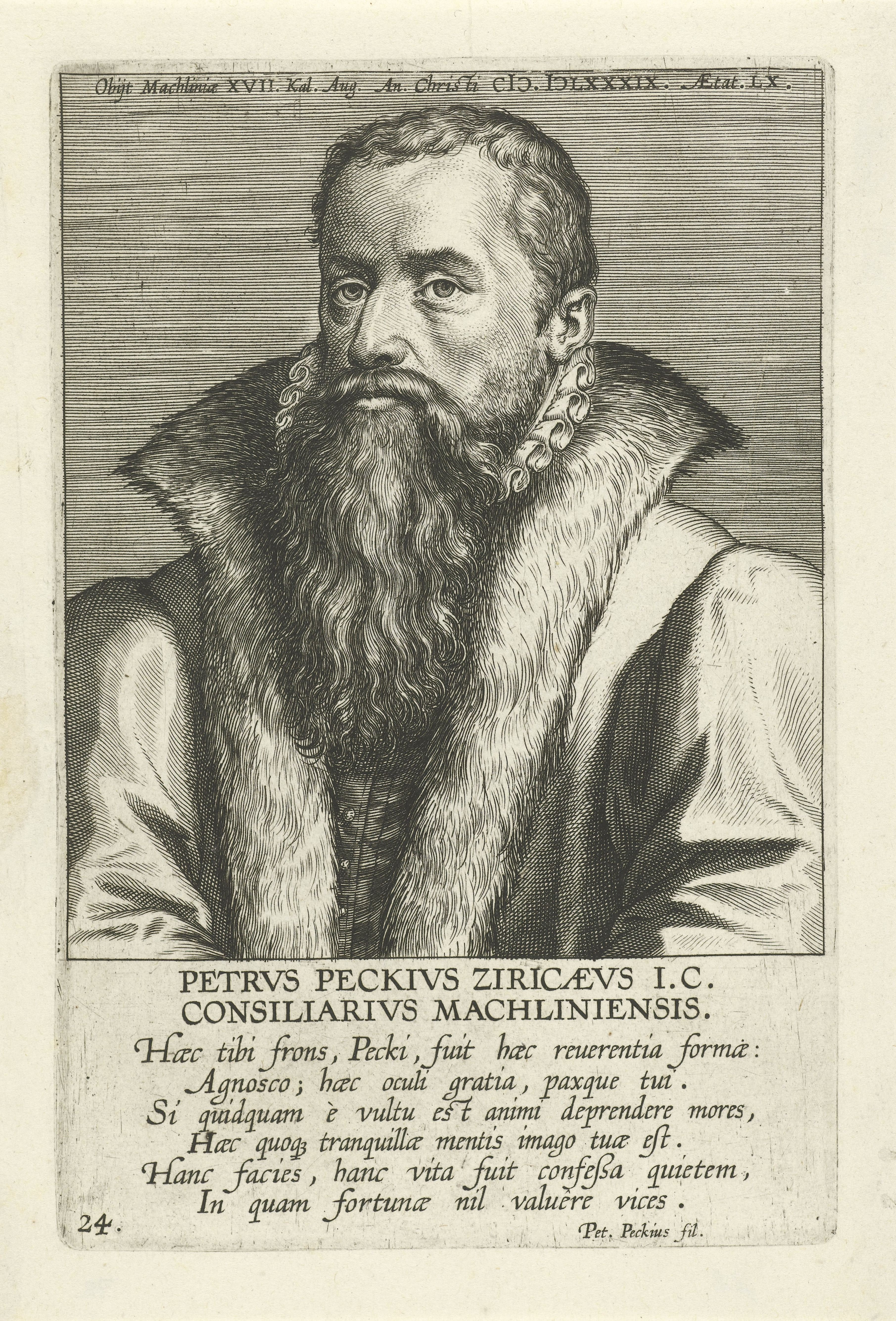

Personal details
- Born: Pieter Peck; 16 July 1529 Zierikzee
- Died: 16 July 1589 Mechelen
- Resting place: Church of St Michael, Leuven
- Spouse: Catharina Gillis
- Children: Petrus Peckius the Younger
- Education: University of Leuven
- Profession: Law professor

Petrus Peckius the Elder (born Pieter Peck, also known as Pierre Peckius; 16 July 1529 in Zierikzee – 16 July 1589 in Mechelen), was a Netherlandish jurist, one of the first to write about international maritime law, and the father of Petrus Peckius the Younger.

He was an orthodox Catholic and remained loyal to the Crown during the Eighty Years' War. In 1582 he was appointed a justice in the Great Council, the supreme law court of the Seventeen Provinces, which normally sat in Mechelen but due to the Dutch Revolt was then meeting in the city of Namur.

He was married to Catharina Gillis (sister of a secretary of Margaret of Parma, and of a governor of Ostend) with whom he had several children.

== Academic career ==
Peck studied Civil and Canon law at the University of Leuven with Gabriel Mudaeus. He received his doctorate on 27 August 1553. As usual in this era for academic scholars he Latinized his name to Peckius.

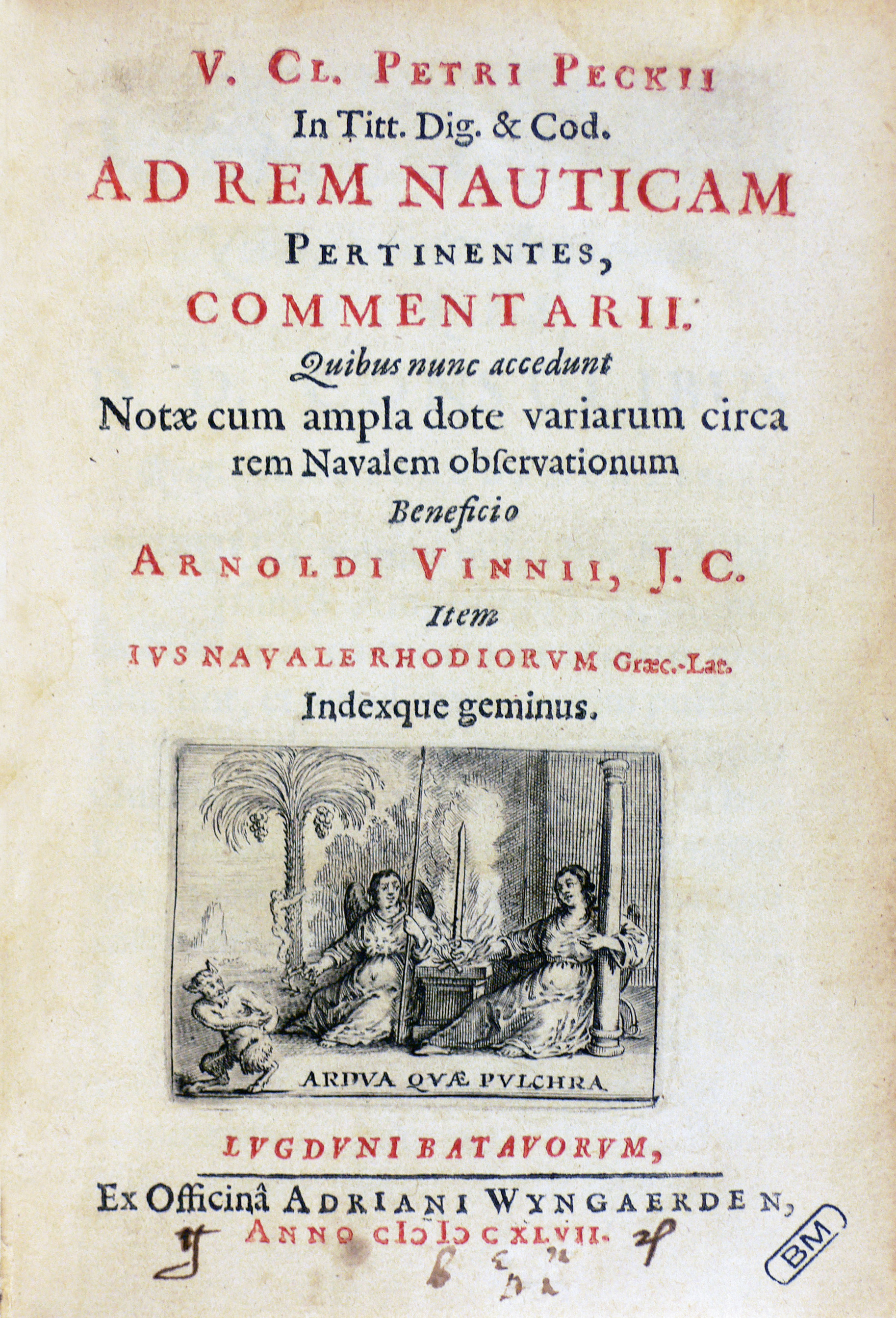
Ad rem nauticam pertinentes, (Milano, Fondazione Mansutti).

He was appointed to the new chair in introductory law (Paratitles) that Philip II of Spain endowed at the university in 1555. Was made ordinarius in Roman Law at the university in 1562. In the same year he succeeded Jean Vendeville, who had left for the University of Douai, as professor of Canon law.

== Publications ==
- De continentia clericorum sive de concubinatu tollendo (Leuven, 1544)
- Paraphrasis in universam legatorum materiam (Leuven, 1553)
- De testamentis Conjugum libr. V (Leuven, 1564), reprinted in Cologne and elsewhere. The parisian edition printed in 1564 is available via KU Leuven Special Collections.
- De ecclesiis catholicis aedificandis et reparandis (Leuven, 1573; Cologne, 1608; etc.)
- Commentarium ad regulas Juris canonici libri VI decretalium (Leuven, 1564; Douai, 1574; Helmstedt, 1588; etc.)
- De amortizatione bonorum a principe impetranda (Cologne, 1582, etc.)
- Commentaria in omnes pene Juris Civilis titulos ad rem nauticam pertinentes (Leuven, 1556; Lyon, 1647; Amsterdam, 1668)

In 1647 an edition of his collected works was produced by Hieronymus Verdussen in Antwerp, under the title Cl. Viri Petri Peckii Ziricaei olim acad. Lov. Jur. Professoris in magno senatu Belgico consiliarii opera omnia. It was reprinted in 1666 and 1679.

== Sources ==
- BRANTS (V.). “Pierre Peckius”. In: “Biographie Nationale”, XVI, pp. 784–792.
- JACOBS, Joannes. (1775) "Petrus Peck" in:Wekelijks nieuws uit Loven, mede beschrijvinge diër stad, vol. 6, pp. 161–163
