= Jean-Charles Snoy et d'Oppuers =

Belgian politician (1907–1991)

Jean V Charles, Count Snoy et d'Oppuers
- Jean-Charles Snoy et d'Oppuers in 1966
- Born: Braine-l'Alleud
- Died: Ophain-Bois-Seigneur-Isaac
- Occupation: politician
- Known for: Minister and mayor of Ophain-Bois-Seigneur-Isaac

Jean V Charles, Count Snoy et d'Oppuers (2 July 1907 in Braine-l'Alleud – 17 May 1991) was a Belgian civil servant, diplomat and Christian Democratic politician of the PSC-CVP.

== Family ==
Jean-Charles was born son of Thierry Idesbald, Baron Snoy et d'Oppuers member of the Belgian Senate, mayor and Jacqueline de Pret Roose de Calesberg. He married Countess Nathalie d'Alcantara and they lived at the Snoy family estate, the Castle of Bois-Seigneur-Isaac.

== Career ==
He studied Law and Thomistic philosophy at the Catholic University of Leuven. He was Secretary-General of the Belgian Ministry of Economic Affairs and Head of the Belgian Delegation to the Intergovernmental Conference on the Common Market and Euratom at the Château of Val-Duchesse in 1956. He notably signed the Treaties of Rome for Belgium, together with Paul-Henri Spaak and Robert Rothschild in 1957. He was Minister of Finance from 1968 to 1971. From 1982 until 1984, he was President of the European League for Economic Cooperation. He was a member of the Steering Committee of the Bilderberg Group.

== Bibliography ==
- Snoy et d'Oppuers, Jean-Charles, Rebâtir l'Europe, Mémoires, Paris, Duculot, 1989.
