= Chancellor of Brabant =

Head of government of the Duchy of Brabant (1183-1794)

The Chancellor of Brabant was the head of the civilian government of the late medieval and early-modern Duchy of Brabant as president of the Council of Brabant.

== List of chancellors ==
=== Late Middle Ages ===
	Period	Name
1.	1326-?	Rogier van Leefdael
2.	1355-	Johan van Gelre
3.	1372-	Johan van Loon, Lord of Agimont
4.	1407-1412	Peter van Camdonck
5.	1426-1429	Joannes de Bont
6.	1429-1431	Gilain de Sart
7.	1431-1445	Joannes Bont
8.	1445-1463	Goswin van der Rydt
9.	1469-1476	Jean l'Orfèvre
10.	1477-1481	Geldolph van der Noot
11.	1481-1483	Jean de la Bouverie
12.	1483	Charles de Groote
13.	1485-1499	Jan, Baron of Houthem
14.	1499	Godfrey Raes
15.	1499	Guillaume de Stradio

=== 16th century ===
	Period	Name
16.	1504	Louis Roelants
17.	1504	Joannes vander Vorst
18.	1509	Jean Le Sauvage
19.	1514-1531	Hyronimus vander Noot
20.	1531	Adolphe vander Noot
21.	1540	Engelbert van den Daele
22.	1557	Jean Scheyfve
23.	1558	Didier of t'Sestich
24.	1581	Theodoor van Liesvelt
25.	1585	Nicholas Damant

=== 17th century ===
	Period	Name
26.	1616-1625	Petrus Peckius, Lord of Bouchove
27.	1626-1649	Ferdinand van Boisschot, Baron of Zaventem
28.	1649-1651	Frans I van Kinschot, Lord of Rivieren
29.	1651 – 1661	Robert van Asseliers
30.	1663 – 1668	Filip Willem van Steenhuys, 1st Baron of Poederlee
31.	1668 – 1686	Simon de Fierlant
32.	1686	Jean-Antoine Locquet, 1st Viscount of Hombeke
33.	1687-1690	Jean-Baptiste Christyn, Baron of Meerbeek
34.	1691	Guillaume-Philippe, Marquess of Herzelles
35.	1698	Guillaume-Albert de Grysperre, Baron of Goyck

=== 18th century ===
	Period	Name
36.	1725-1739	Honoré-Henri d'Eesbeecke, Viscount de Haeghen
37.	1739	Jean de Schockaert
38.	1746	Philippe-Cleriarde du Chesne
39.	1756	Louis-François, Count de Robiano
40.	1763	Gilles-François Streithagen
41.	1769	Joseph de Crumpipen
42.	1794	Gaspard-Joseph de Limpens
43.	1794	Pierre-Dominique van den Velde
