= Philippe-Ambroise d'Olmen, Baron de Poederlé =

Philippe Ambroise Eugène Ghislain d'Olmen, Baron of Poederlé
- Born: Philippe Ambroise Eugène Ghislain d'Olmen de Poederlé; 7 December 1793; Brussels
- Died: 2 October 1815 (aged 21); Brussels
- Occupation(s): politician, soldier

Philippe II Ambroise Eugène Ghislain d'Olmen, 1st baron of Poederlé (7 December 1793 – 2 October 1815) was a soldier and politician of the Austrian Netherlands.

He was the son of Eugène II Joseph d'Olmen, Baron of Poederlee and Hypollite Françoise de Vicq, Lady of Kontich. His father was lord chamberlain at the imperial court. He married Louise Charlotte de Maret de Brouenne and had a son, Hypolitte Ernest d'Olmen, who was Baron of Poederlee after his father's death.
