= Perpetual Edict (1611) =

Decree governing legal process in the Southern Netherlands

Archdukes Albert and Isabella
- Long title: Ordonnance et edict perpetuel pour meilleure direction des affaires de la justice Ordonnantie ende eeuwich edict tot beter directie vande saeken van Justicie (Decree and perpetual edict for the better direction of matters of justice)
- Territorial extent: Spanish Netherlands
- Enacted by: Archdukes Albert and Isabella
- Signed by: Louis Verreycken
- Signed: 12 July 1611; 414 years ago

The Perpetual Edict of 12 July 1611 was a decree of the Archdukes Albert and Isabella governing legal process in the Southern Netherlands. It consisted of 47 clauses laying out the basic rules of criminal and civil procedure. It was printed in both Dutch and French by Rutger Velpius, printer to the court. The edict had a fundamental impact on the codification of customary law, which it did much to encourage. It also placed a legal obligation on parish churches to register births, marriages and deaths (alongside the existing ecclesiastical legislation to that effect), and on local magistrates to ensure that the secular authorities obtained a copy of such registers each year (a stipulation apparently only applied in the city of Mechelen).

== Studies ==
- Antonius Anselmo, Commentaria ad perpetuum edictum serenissimorum Belgii principum Alberti et Isabellae evulgatum 12. Iulii. M.DC.XI (Antwerp: Petrus Bellerus, 1656), available on Google Books; 2nd edition 1664 (on Google Books); 3rd edition 1701 (on Google Books)
- Georges Martyn, Het Eeuwig Edict van 12 juli 1611: Zijn genese en zijn rol in de verschriftelijking van het privaatrecht (Brussels: Algemeen Rijksarchief, 2000).
