= Diodorus Tuldenus =

- Theodoor van Tulden
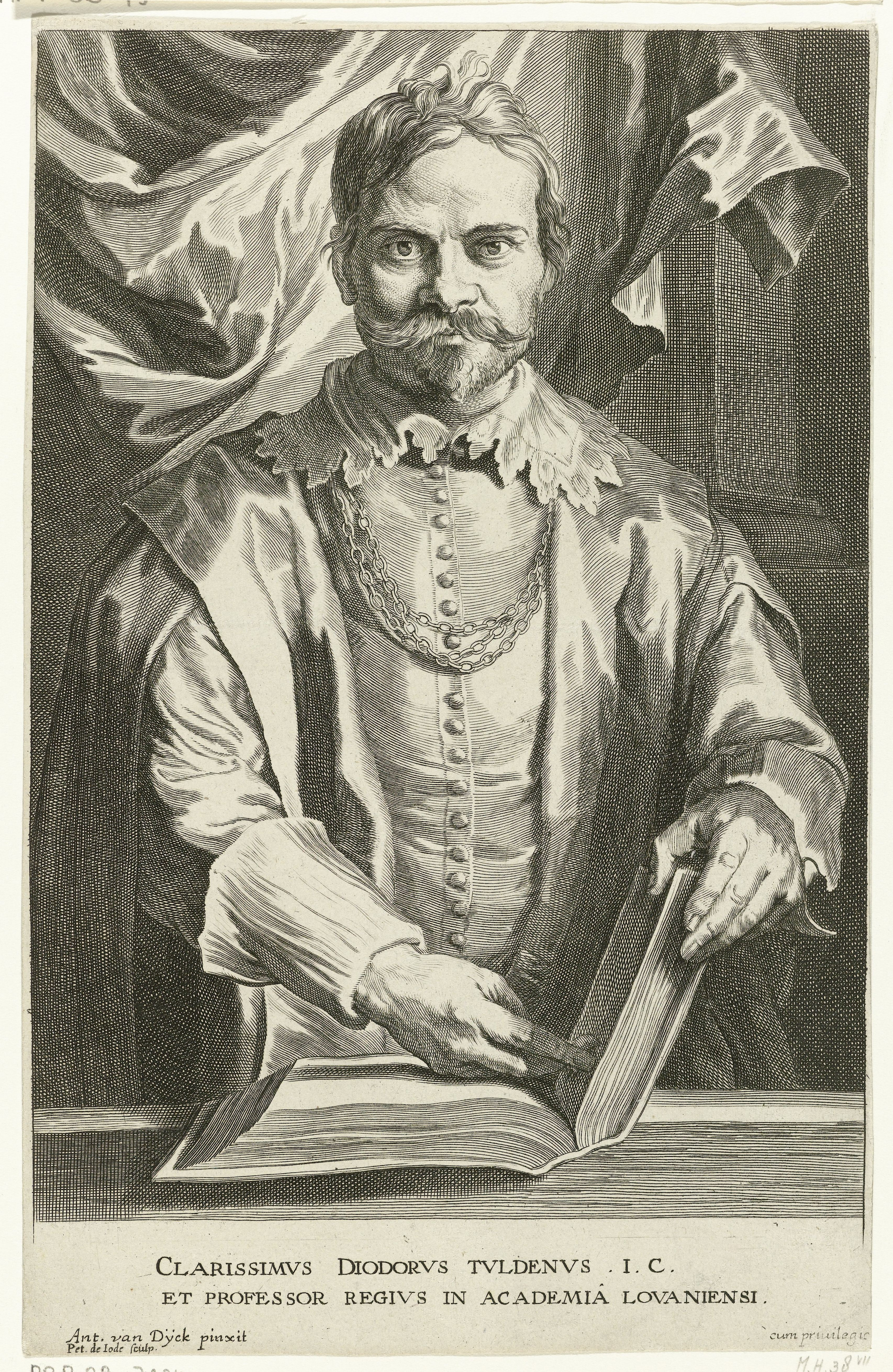
- Portrait of Tuldenus engraved by Pieter de Jode II after Anthony van Dyck, from Icones Principum Vivorum Doctorum (1648)
- Born: late 16th century 's-Hertogenbosch
- Died: 16 November 1645; Mechelen
- Education: Old University of Leuven
- Spouse: Catherine-Claire van Grevenbroeck
- Children: Florent Tuldenus
- Scientific career
- Fields: Roman law, Judicial corruption
- Workplaces: City council of 's-Hertogenbosch; Old University of Leuven
- Thesis: (1633)
- Academic advisors: Erycius Puteanus

Diodorus Tuldenus, born Theodoor van Tulden (died 16 November, 1645) was regius professor of Civil Law at the University of Leuven.

== Life ==
Tuldenus was born in 's-Hertogenbosch at an unknown date in the late 16th century, the son of Nicolas Van Tulden, a lawyer who served on the city council. He then attended the University of Leuven, where he studied moral and political philosophy under Erycius Puteanus and thereafter law. Graduating in 1615, he returned to 's-Hertogenbosch and joined the city administration. In 1620 he obtained the chair in civil law at the university, with dispensation for his lack of a doctorate. He obtained the doctorate of law in 1633. In 1645 he was appointed to the Great Council of Mechelen, the highest court of appeal in the Spanish Netherlands. He died in Mechelen on 16 November 1645, only four months after taking up the position.

He was married to Catherine-Claire van Grevenbroeck, and one of their sons, Florent Tuldenus, later himself became a councillor of the Great Council.

== Works ==
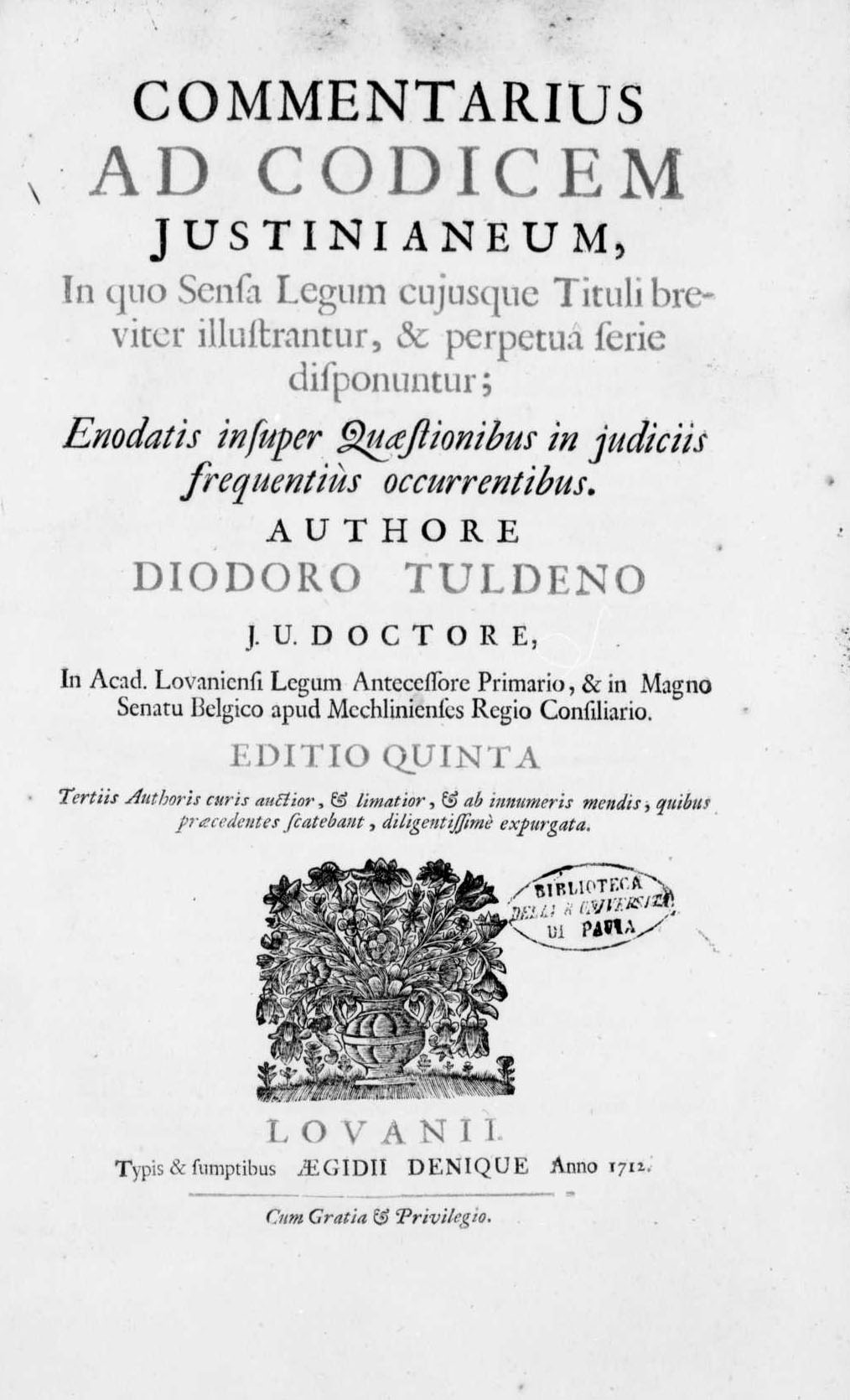
Commentarius ad Codicem iustinianeum, 1712 edition

- Dissertationum Socraticarum libri duo. Leuven, 1620.
- De principiis jurisprudentiae libri quatuor. Leuven, P. Dormalius, 1621
- Ad Institutionum juris civilis Imperatoris Justiniani libros quatuor commentarius. Leuven, 1622. A commentary on the Institutes of Justinian, dedicated to Jacobus Boonen. 1633 Edition available via KU Leuven Special Collections.
- De causis corruptorum judiciorum et remediis libri quatuor. Cologne, 1624. Dedicated to the States of Brabant.
- De jurisprudentia extemporali sive series regularum. 2 vols., Leuven, 1628-1629.
- De cognitione sui libri quinque. Leuven, 1630. Dedicated to Antwerp city council. Iena, 1706, available via KU Leuven Special Collections.
- Initiamenta jurisprudentiae tredecim orationibus auspicalibus comprehensa. Leuven, 1633. Dedicated to Frans I van Kinschot. Available via KU Leuven Special Collections.
- Commentarius ad codicem Justinianeum. Louvain, 1651. A commentary on the Codex Justinianus.
- Opera omnia. 4 vols., Leuven, Gilles Denique, 1702–1712.

=== Editions ===
- Commentary on the Institutes (1628 edition) on Google Books
- Commentary on the Codex Justinianus (1650 edition) on Google Books
- Commentarius ad Codicem iustinianeum (in Latin). Leuven: Gilles Denique. 1712.
- In quatuor libros Institutionum iuris civilis commentarius (in Latin). Leuven: Gilles Denique. 1702.
- De iurisprudentia extemporali (in Latin). Leuven: Gilles Denique. 1702.
- De causis corruptorum iudiciorum et remediis (in Latin). Leuven: Gilles Denique. 1702.
- Initiamenta iurisprudentiae tredecim orationibus auspicalibus comprehensa (in Latin). Leuven: Gilles Denique. 1702.
- De principiis iurisprudentiae (in Latin). Leuven: Gilles Denique. 1702.
- De civili regimine (in Latin). Leuven: Gilles Denique. 1702.
- Commentarius in Digesta (in Latin). Vol. 1. Leuven: Gilles Denique. 1702.
- Commentarius in Digesta (in Latin). Vol. 2. Leuven: Gilles Denique. 1702.
