= Petrus Peckius the Younger =

Dutch diplomat and chancellor

Chancellor Petrus Peckius Lord of Bouchove
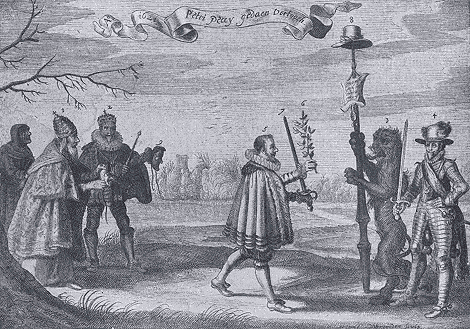
- Satirical print depicting Peckius holding a sword and an olive branch at negotiations concerning the Twelve Years' Truce.

Chancellor of Brabant
- In office 1616–1625
- Monarchs: Archduke Albert (to July 1621); Philip IV of Spain (from July 1621)
- Governor General: Infanta Isabella (from July 1621)
- Preceded by: Nicholas Damant
- Succeeded by: Ferdinand van Boisschot

Personal details
- Born: Pieter Peck; 1562 Leuven, Duchy of Brabant, Habsburg Netherlands
- Died: 28 July 1625 (aged 62–63) Brussels, Duchy of Brabant, Spanish Netherlands
- Spouse: Barbara-Maria Boonen
- Relations: Petrus Peckius the Elder (father); Jacobus Boonen (brother-in-law)
- Education: University of Leuven
- Profession: Lawyer

Petrus Peckius the Younger, also known as Petrus Pecquius or Pierre Peckius (born Pieter Peck; 1562 – 28 July 1625), was a diplomat and chancellor of Brabant for the Sovereign Archdukes Albert and Isabella. He is best known for a failed attempt to negotiate a renewal of the Twelve Years' Truce in 1621. He was the son of Petrus Peckius the Elder.

Peckius the Younger married Barbara-Maria Boonen, a daughter of Cornelius Boonen, a councillor in the Council of State, who was murdered in 1579 for his pro-Spanish sympathies. Her brother was Jacobus Boonen, archbishop of Mechelen from 1620. They had four children, one of whom, Pieter-Antonius, became a visitor-general of the Carthusian Order.

== Career ==
Peck was born in Leuven. In 1580 he matriculated at the University of Leuven, where his father was a law professor, and like his father he Latinized his name to Petrus Peckius, though he did not become an academic scholar. Instead, after obtaining his law degree he practiced law before the Great Council at Mechelen, the highest law court of the Habsburg Netherlands. In 1601 he was appointed Maître des requêtes at this court. In 1608 he was sent to the court of Henry IV of France as ambassador of the Archdukes Albert and Isabella. During this period the Twelve Years' Truce was negotiated, with French mediation, and Peckius tried to influence this process. He was in Paris when Henry IV was assassinated. He returned to the Spanish Netherlands in 1611 and was reappointed to the Great Council in Mechelen. In 1614 he became deputy-chancellor of the Duchy of Brabant and in 1616 chancellor. In the same year he was appointed a councillor in the Council of State and the Privy Council of the Archdukes. In 1620 he took part in the peace negotiations at Würzburg between the Bohemian insurgents and Ferdinand II, Holy Roman Emperor during the first stage of the Thirty Years' War.

In 1621 he was sent to The Hague by the government in Brussels to negotiate a renewal of the Twelve Years' Truce with the States-General of the Netherlands. On travelling through Holland he was mobbed in Delft by hostile crowds, a breach of diplomatic immunity that his hosts claimed to have been powerless to prevent. Upon reaching The Hague he delivered a rather tactless address to the States-General on March 23, 1621, in which he proposed that the Dutch Republic would be left to run its own affairs in return for a nominal recognition of the sovereignty of the king of Spain. This suggestion was not well received by his hosts and he was sent back with an indignant rejection of his proposal. After this échec he seems to have fallen in disfavor. However, he had earlier been knighted and been made Lord of Boechout and Borsbeek. He died in Brussels.

== Portrait ==
There is a portrait of Peckius by Peter Paul Rubens in the National Gallery of Scotland.

== Sources ==
- BRANTS (V.). “Pierre Peckius”. In: “Biographie Nationale”, XVI, pp. 784–792.
- JACOBS, Joannes. (1775) "Petrus Peck" in:Wekelijks nieuws uit Loven, mede beschrijvinge diër stad, vol. 6, pp. 161–163

Preceded by Nicholas Damant	Chancellor of Brabant; 1616 – 1625	Succeeded by Ferdinand van Boisschot
