= Council of State of the Habsburg Netherlands =

The Council of State of the Habsburg Netherlands was one of the foremost government institutions in the early-modern Low Countries. It was established as one of three "collateral councils" alongside the Privy Council and Council of Finances by a decree of Emperor Charles V of 1 October 1531.

While the Privy Council specialised in administrative and legal issues and the Council of Finances on government finances, the Council of State was responsible for the broadest questions of government policy. Its members, specified in 1531 as twelve but thereafter often fewer, were drawn from the highest nobility, especially those who were Knights of the Golden Fleece, and the highest clergy.

In 1578, during the course of the Dutch Revolt, the rebels refused to recognise the authority of the Council of State, which remained one of the key institutions of royal rule in the Spanish Netherlands. By 1588, the Dutch Republic had established its own, rival Council of State.
