= Privy Council of the Habsburg Netherlands =

Administrative body of the Habsburg Netherlands

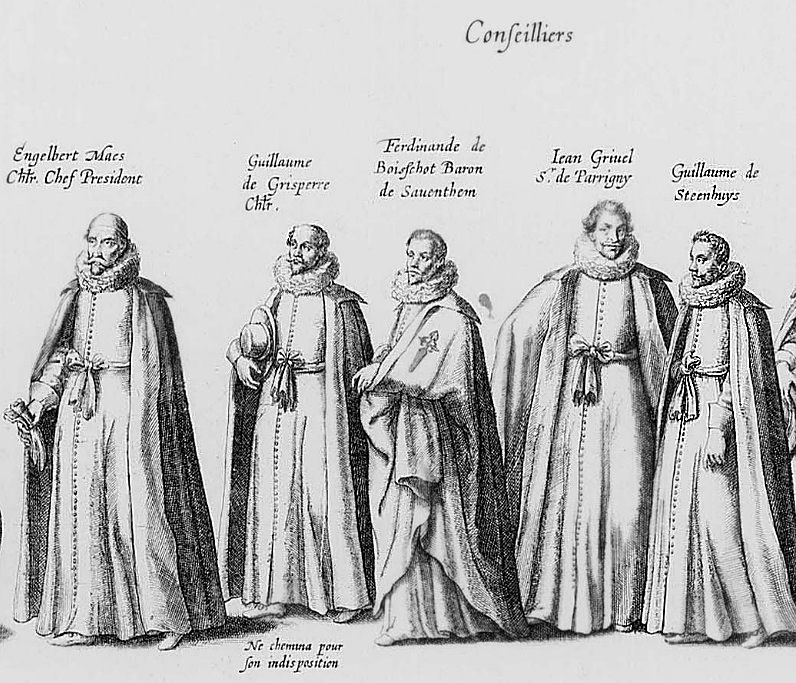
Privy Councillors Engelbert Maes, Guillaume de Grysperre, Ferdinand de Boisschot, Jean Grivel and Guillaume de Steenhuys in the funeral cortege of Archduke Albert (1622)

The Privy Council or Secret Council (Dutch: Geheime Raad, French: Conseil Privé) was one of the highest government institutions of the Habsburg Netherlands. Based in Brussels, it was particularly charged with legal and administrative questions.

== History ==
The Council was founded on 1 October 1531 by Emperor Charles V, as one of the three "collateral councils" alongside the Council of State and Council of Finances. He prescribed a president, eight councillors, and a secretary.

Philip V of Spain abolished the council in 1702, but it was later restored by the archduchess-governess Maria Christina, Duchess of Teschen and finally abolished by the Brabant Revolution.

== Personnel ==
=== Presidents ===
- 1531–1540: Jean Carondelet.
- 1531–1540: Pieter Tayspil
- 1540–1548: Lodewijk van Schore
- 1549–1569: Viglius van Aytta
- 1569–1573: Charles de Tisnacq
- 1573–1575: Viglius van Aytta
- 1575–1583: Arnoud Sasbout
- 1587–1592: Willem van Pamele
- 1592–1595: Jan van der Burch
- 1597–1609: Jean Richardot
- 1614–1630: Engelbert Maes
- 1632–1653: Pieter Roose
- 1653–1671: Charles de Hovyne
- 1672–1684: Léon-Jean de Paepe
- 1684–1694: Pieter Frans Blondel
- 1694–1702: Albert de Coxie, baron of Moorsele.
- 1725–1732: Christophe-Ernest, 1st Count of Baillet
- 1733–1739: Jean Alphonse, 1st Count de Coloma
- 1739–1758: Gilles-Augustin de Steenhault

=== Councillors ===
- Ferdinand van Boisschot
- Jean Grivel
- Guillaume de Grysperre
- Antoine Reniers
- Louis-Alexander Scockart
- Willem van Steenhuys

=== Secretary ===
- Lodewijk Verreycken
- Lodewijk Frans Verreycken
- Albert Rubens (1614–1657)

== See also ==
- Council of Brabant
- Council of Flanders
- Council of Luxembourg
- Council of Troubles
- Great Council of Mechelen
- Supreme Council of Flanders
