= Council of Brabant =

Highest court in the Duchy of Brabant (1183-1794)

- Conseil de Brabant / Raad van Brabant
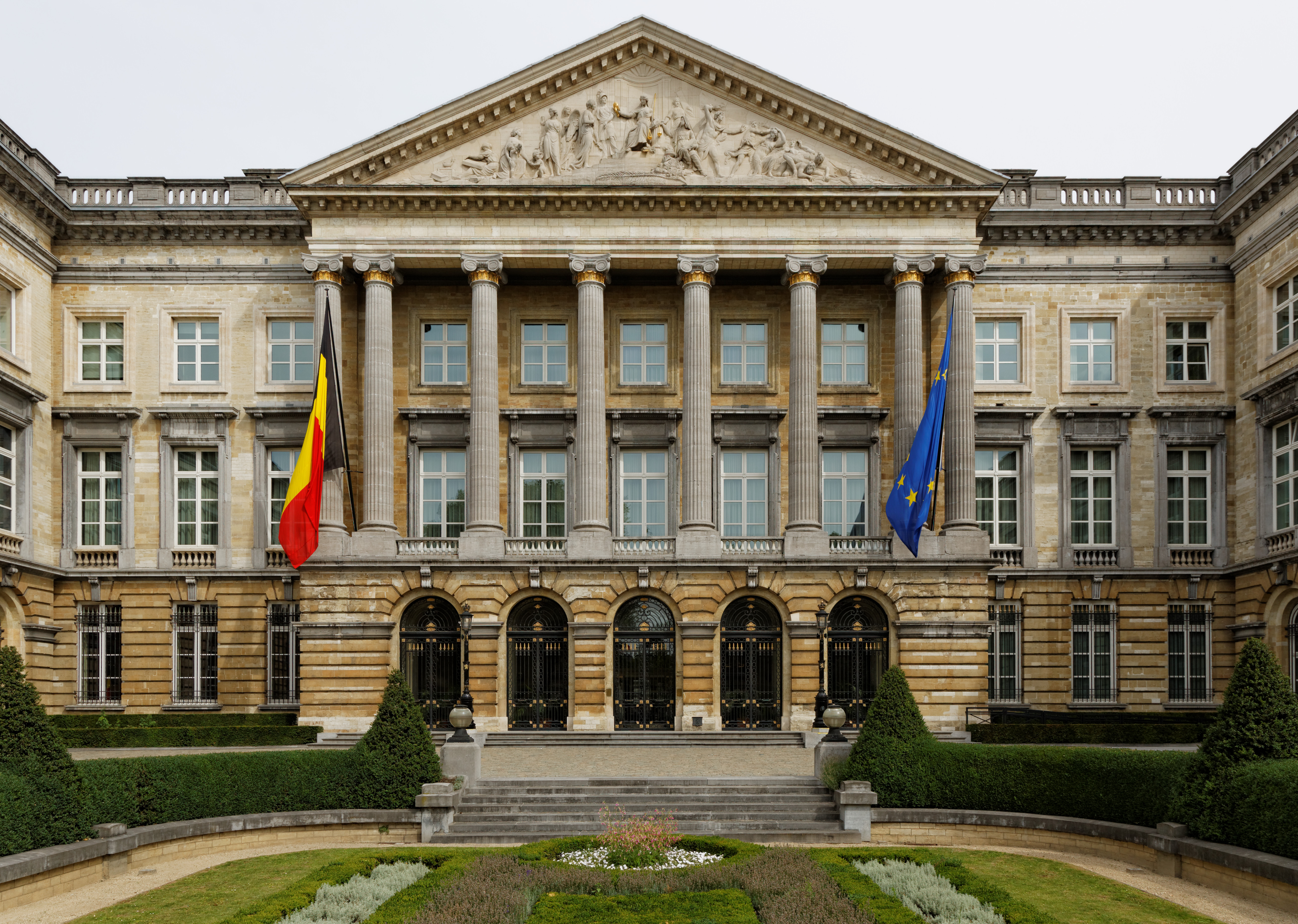
- Palace of the Council of Brabant (1783) (now the Belgian Federal Parliament)
- Established: 1430
- Dissolved: 1794
- Jurisdiction: Duchy of Brabant
- Location: Brussels

The Council of Brabant was the highest law court in the historic Duchy of Brabant. It was presided over by the chancellor of Brabant. One of its functions was to determine that new legislation was not contrary to the rights and liberties established in the Joyous Entry.

The Belgian Federal Parliament now sits in the building that was designed in the late 18th century by Gilles-Barnabé Guimard as the Palace of the Council of Brabant.

== Abolition ==
On 1 January 1787, Emperor Joseph II decreed the abolition of the Council of Brabant, which had resisted his reforming measures as conflicting with the established liberties of the duchy, and ordered that it be replaced with a number of tribunals to be newly instituted. On 20 April the Council nullified this decree as contrary to the liberties of the duchy and ordered its members to give no heed to it. At the end of May 1787 the government in Brussels postponed the implementation of judicial innovations, and in September abolished the decree. On 18 June 1789 Joseph II's representative in Brussels, Ferdinand von Trauttmansdorff, declared that the powers of the Council of Brabant would henceforth be exercised by the Great Council of Mechelen. This government coup was one of the direct causes of the Brabant Revolution. The Council was finally abolished under the French occupation of 1794–1814.

== Notable members ==
- Willem Van der Tanerijen (died 1499)
- Cornelius Wytfliet (1555–1597)
- Petrus Peckius the Younger (1562–1625)
- Ferdinand van Boisschot (died 1649)
- Guillaume Wittouck (1749–1829)

== See also ==
- Chancellor of Brabant
