= Baschleiden =

Village in Luxembourg

Baschleiden Baschelt
- Village
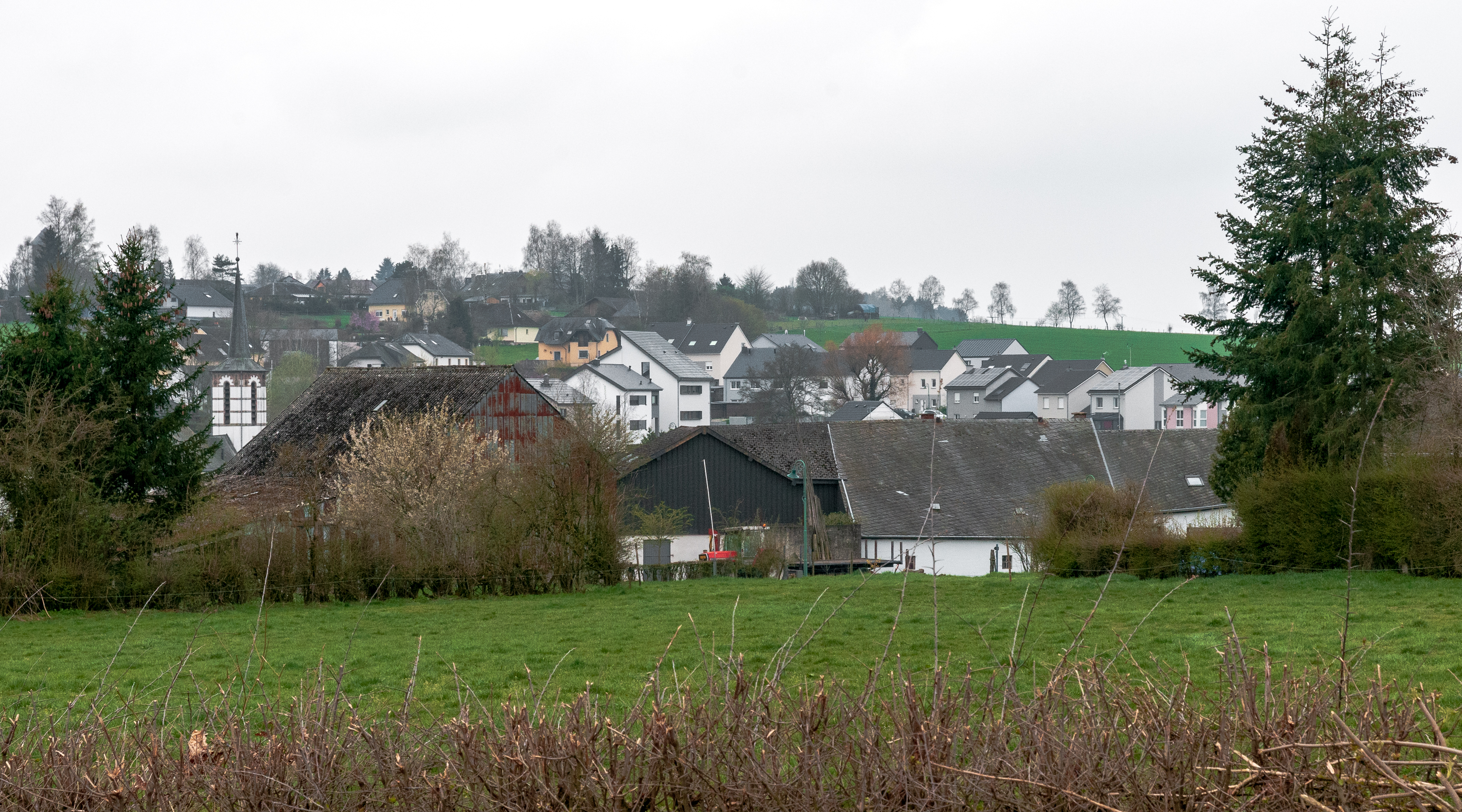
- Interactive map of Baschleiden
- Coordinates: 49°53′53″N 5°49′4″E
- Country: Luxembourg
- Canton: Wiltz
- Commune: Boulaide

Baschleiden (Luxembourgish: Baschelt) is a village in the commune of Boulaide, in north-western Luxembourg. As of September 2026, the village had a population of 507.

It was the birthplace of Charles-Gérard Eyschen (1800–1859), who became Director-General for Justice, and of Hieronymus van Busleyden (1470?-1517), archdean of Cambrais, member of the High Council of Mechelen for the Burgundy lands, and co-founder (with Erasmus) of Leuven's Collegium Trilingue, a.k.a. Collegium Buslidium. His city mansion in Mechelen, Hof van Busleyden, is now a museum. In Leuven, the Busleydengang (Busleyden Alley) leads to what's left of Trilingue.

== See also ==
Media related to Baschleiden at Wikimedia Commons
