= François de Busleyden =

Roman Catholic Archbishop (1455-1502)

François of Busleyden
- Archbishop of Besançon
- Native name: Frans van Busleyden

Personal details
- Born: François van Busleyden c. 1455 Arlon, Burgundian Netherlands
- Died: 23 August 1502 Toledo, Spain
- Parents: Gilles I de Busleyden

François of Busleyden (French: François de Busleyden; Dutch: Frans van Busleyden) or Frans (died 23 August 1502) was a Roman Catholic Archbishop of Besançon, provost, and a politician.

== Biography ==
François de Busleyden was born around c. 1455 in Arlon to an old Luxembourgish family from Bauschleyden. His parents were Gilles I and Jeanne Elisabeth de Mussey of Marville, Meuse. His brothers were Gilles II, Valérien, and Jérôme de Busleyden.

François de Busleyden was named canon of Saint Lambert's Cathedral, Liège before 1485 by the Old University of Leuven, replacing J de Herbeys, and on 22 August 1485, he was elected provost of the Liége chapter, succeeding Jean de Lalaing.

Maximilian I employed François de Busleyden, known for his education, in times of need. François de Busleyden was then appointed as the tutor of Prince Philip, father of Charles V. In reward for his services, he was granted the bishopric of Besançon.

François de Busleyden acquired the land for the Hof van Busleyden in Mechelen in 1494. In 1496, the city, wishing to recognize his services, granted him land adjoining his residence. Construction began in 1503 and finished in 1507.

On 12 October 1498, he became Archbishop of Besançon. Succeeding Charles de Neufchâtel, he held the position until his death. Under his episcopate, two acts from 1499 and 1501 regulated the curial rights of the church of Mandeure, agreed upon by Archbishop François de Busleyden and Richard Tissot.

In Brussels in 1501, he was among the signors of Margaret of Austria, Duchess of Savoy's third matrimonial contract. He also acted as a signor of the marriage contract between Claude and Charles V on 10 August 1501 in Lyon.

On 3 November 1501, Archbishop François left Brussels for Spain with Philip the Handsome, King of Castille, and was appointed Bishop of Coria. He was made a cardinal in secret at the request of Philip the Handsome, but he died before this could be made official.

== Death ==
François de Busleyden died on 23 August 1502 in Toledo, Spain. He died at the cloister of St. Bernard lez Thoulette. Among his estate, inherited by his three brothers, was a large house with outbuildings and gardens in the Koestraat (Rue des Vaches) in Mechelen, today known as the Hof van Busleyden.
