= Neder-Over-Heembeek =

Neighbourhood in Brussels, Belgium

- Neighbourhood
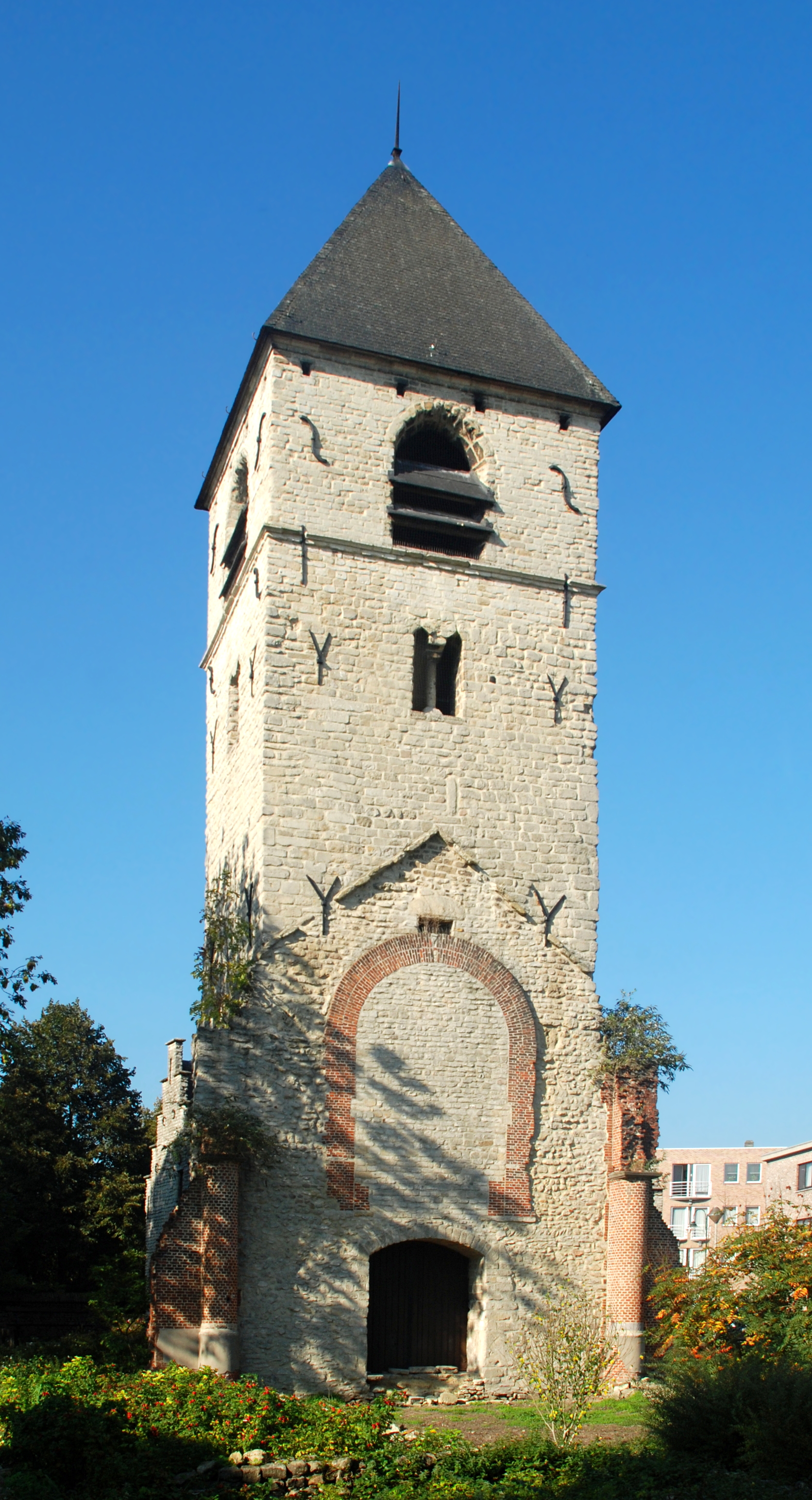
- Old Romanesque tower in Lower Heembeek
- Nickname: NOH
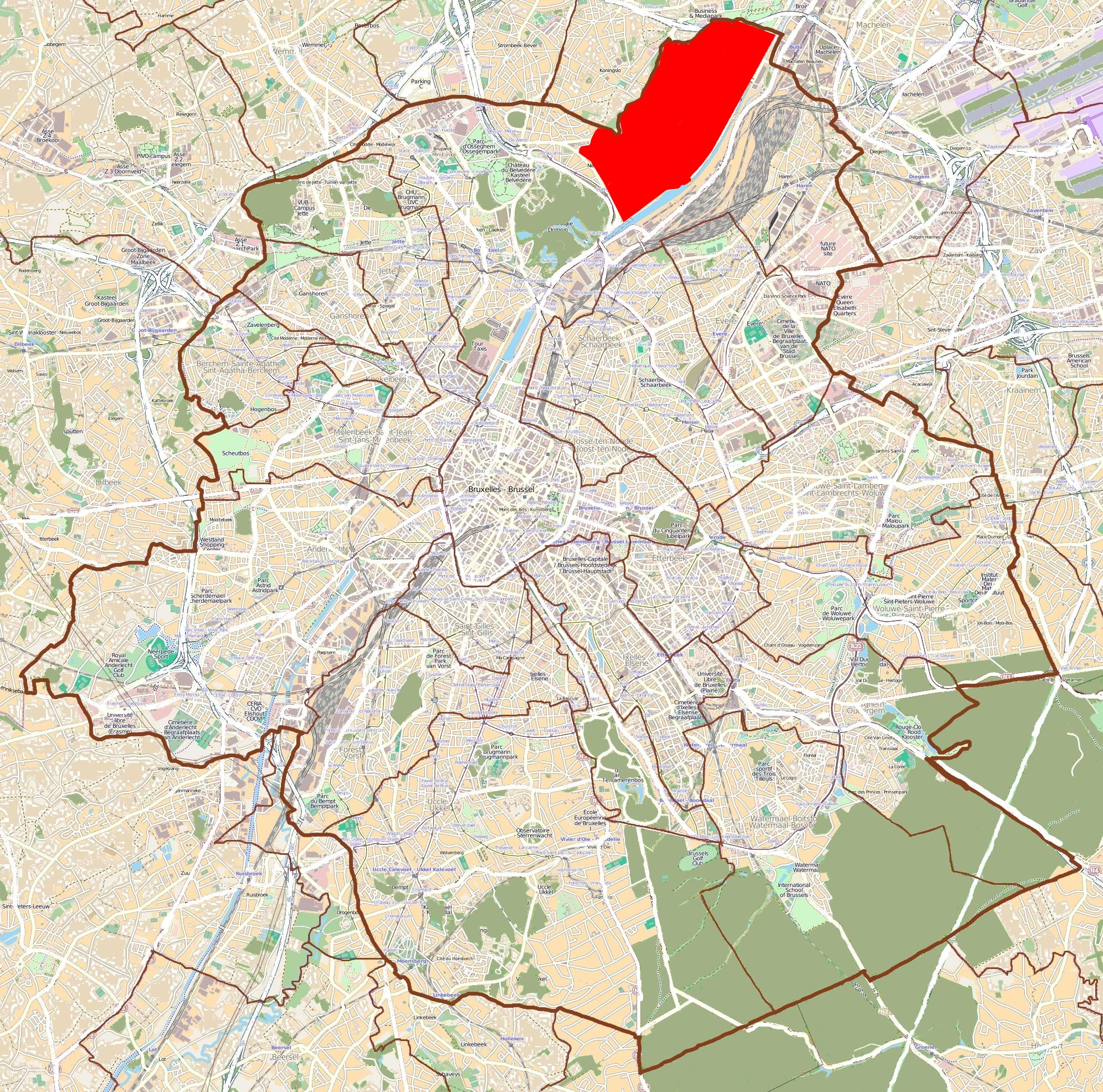
- Location within Belgium

- Location within Belgium
- Coordinates: 50°54′00″N 4°23′00″E
- Country: Belgium
- Region: Brussels-Capital Region
- Arrondissement: Brussels-Capital
- Municipality: City of Brussels

Area
  - Total: 5.41 km^{2} (2.09 sq mi)

Population (2012)
  - Total: 17,595
- Time zone: UTC+1 (CET)
  - Summer (DST): UTC+2 (CEST)
- Postal code: 1120
- Area codes: 02

Neder-Over-Heembeek (French: [nedœʁ ovœʁ embek]; Dutch: [ˈneːdər oːvər ˈɦeːmbeːk]) is a former municipality of Brussels, Belgium, that was merged into the City of Brussels in 1921. Nowadays, it is a northern section of that municipality, and a predominantly industrial zone, especially known for the Queen Astrid Military Hospital, which is the National Burns and Poisons Centre.

== History ==
=== Origins and medieval times ===
Hembeek was once a small village on the edge of medieval Brussels, and was founded around a small church that became the centre of a parish. Later, a second church was built around a growing hamlet in the north, and the two parishes were separated, that became two villages: Over-Heembeek ("Upper Heembeek") surrounding the Church of St. Nicholas in the northern part, and Neder-Heembeek ("Lower Heembeek") surrounding the Church of St. Peter and St. Paul in the southern part of Heembeek. Both parishes came into the possession of Dieleghem Abbey in 1112 and 1155, respectively.

=== 15th–18th centuries ===
During the 15th century, the Goudenaken family was the owner of the castle at Lower Heembeek. In 1505, it came into the possession of the famous Busleyden family with the marriage of Adriana van Goudenaken and Gilles II de Busleyden. They had twelve children. Gilles was the brother of two other famous members of the family: Hieronymus van Busleyden and Frans van Busleyden (aka Franciscus Buslidius). For more than a century, the castle remained in the hands of the Busleyden family. In 1554, after the decease of his mother Adriana, Jan van Busleyden became Lord at Heembeek. But only two years later he died, and his son Gilis inherited Heembeek Castle in 1557. Being a minor, he came under the guardianship of his uncle Willem van Busleyden. Gilis died in Brussels in 1596. With his wife Anna he had six children. Adriaan-Eric Van Busleyden inherited Heembeek Castle, but he died in 1617. His brother Lodewijk had already died in 1615 and the castle was handed to Margareta Van Busleyden. She was married to Jan van Tiras. When Margareta died in 1663, Frans-Robrecht van Tyras became heir of the castle at Lower Heembeek (sloth van busleyden op de schipvaert). He died two months later and Jan Frans 't Serclaes, the son of Joanna Van Busleyden became the next owner of het casteelke of sloth van Busleyden. He sold the castle in 1674 to the monks at Dieleghem Abbey. Two years later, they resold the castle to the widow of Jan Bollaert from the well-known merchant family in Antwerp.

=== 19th century and later ===
In 1814, the two parishes of Lower and Upper Heembeek were finally merged into one parish when the first municipality did appear in 1813, but instead of taking back the older name Heembeek, the two adjectives were kept to preserve the identity of the two parishes.

In 1921, the former Brabantian municipalities of Haren, Laken and Neder-Over-Heembeek were annexed by the City of Brussels, tripling the size of the Belgian capital to its present-day extent.

Nowadays, as a part of the City of Brussels, "Heembeek" is frequently used to name various civil and commercial services located in that area (such as transportation stops, or a school), ignoring the historic distinction of parishes.

== Jan van Helmont and alchemy ==
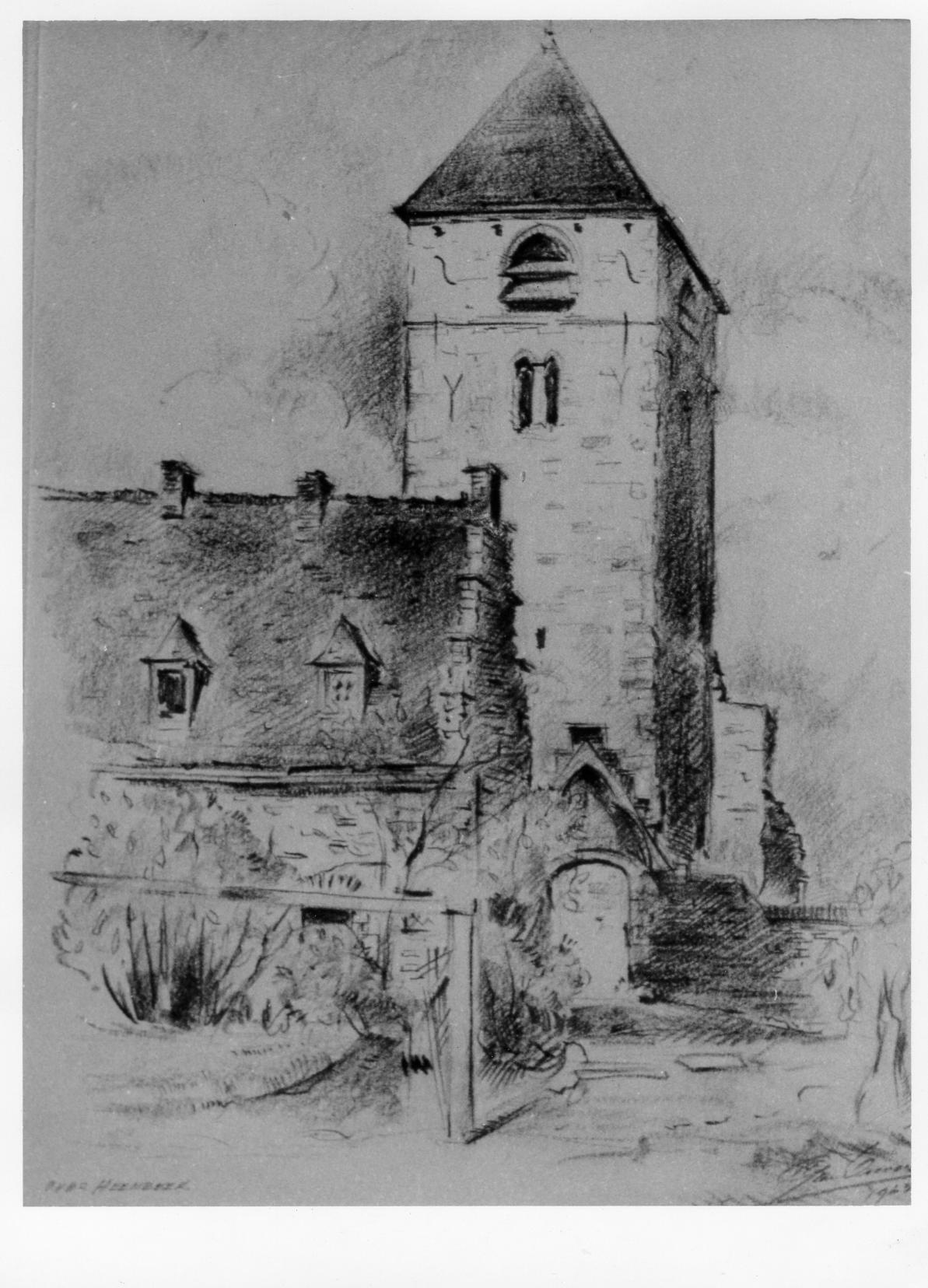
The Romanesque tower of the Church of St. Peter and St. Paul in Lower Heembeek and the house where Jan Baptist van Helmont performed an alchemical transmutation (drawing by Leon Van Dievoet, 1963)

In 1618 or thereabouts, a most curious incident changed the course of scientific history here. In a farm near the church lived the local medic, one Jan van Helmont, a follower of the teachings of Paracelsus. His son Mercurius, a close friend, tutor and collaborator of Leibniz, records that one evening, a stranger knocked at the door and was admitted. The two men talked late into the night about alchemy, and on leaving, the stranger left van Helmont with some unusual powder. He immediately mixed it with eight ounces of mercury, sealed in a clay crucible, which was heated over the fire for twenty minutes, and broke the pot, to find eight ounces of gold. There are some suggestions that this visitor may have been a researcher who had had a significant hand in events leading up to the execution of the Counts of Egmont and Horn for heresy in 1568. This opened van Helmont's eyes to the possibility of scientific process, and he went on to become one of the founding fathers of modern chemistry.

In 1843, the same farm became the residence of Count Gioacchino Pecci, the Papal Nuncio, who showed a more than passing interest in searching the place from top to bottom. Count Pecci became Pope Leo XIII in 1878.

== Gallery ==
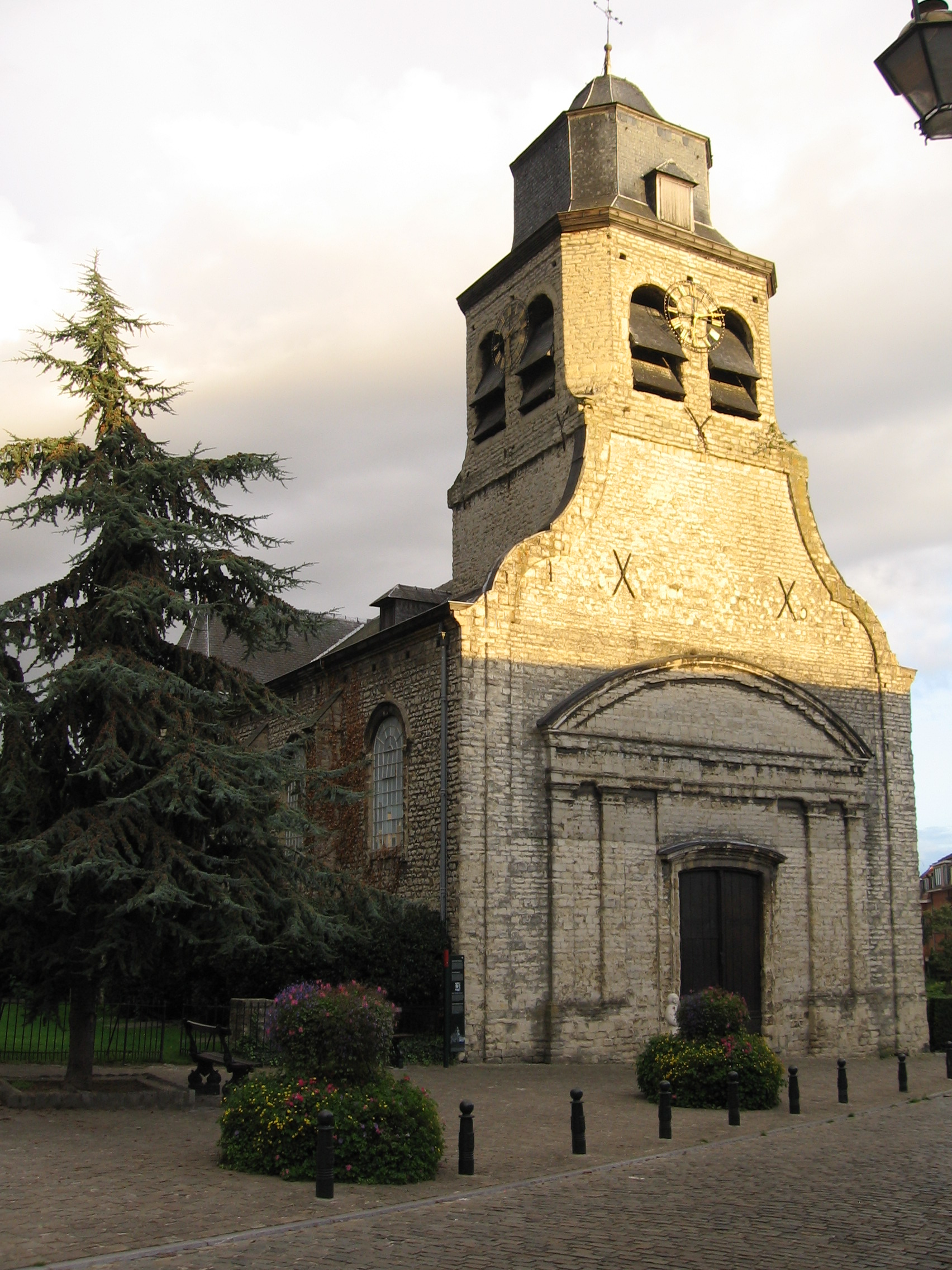
Church of St. Nicholas in Upper Heembeek

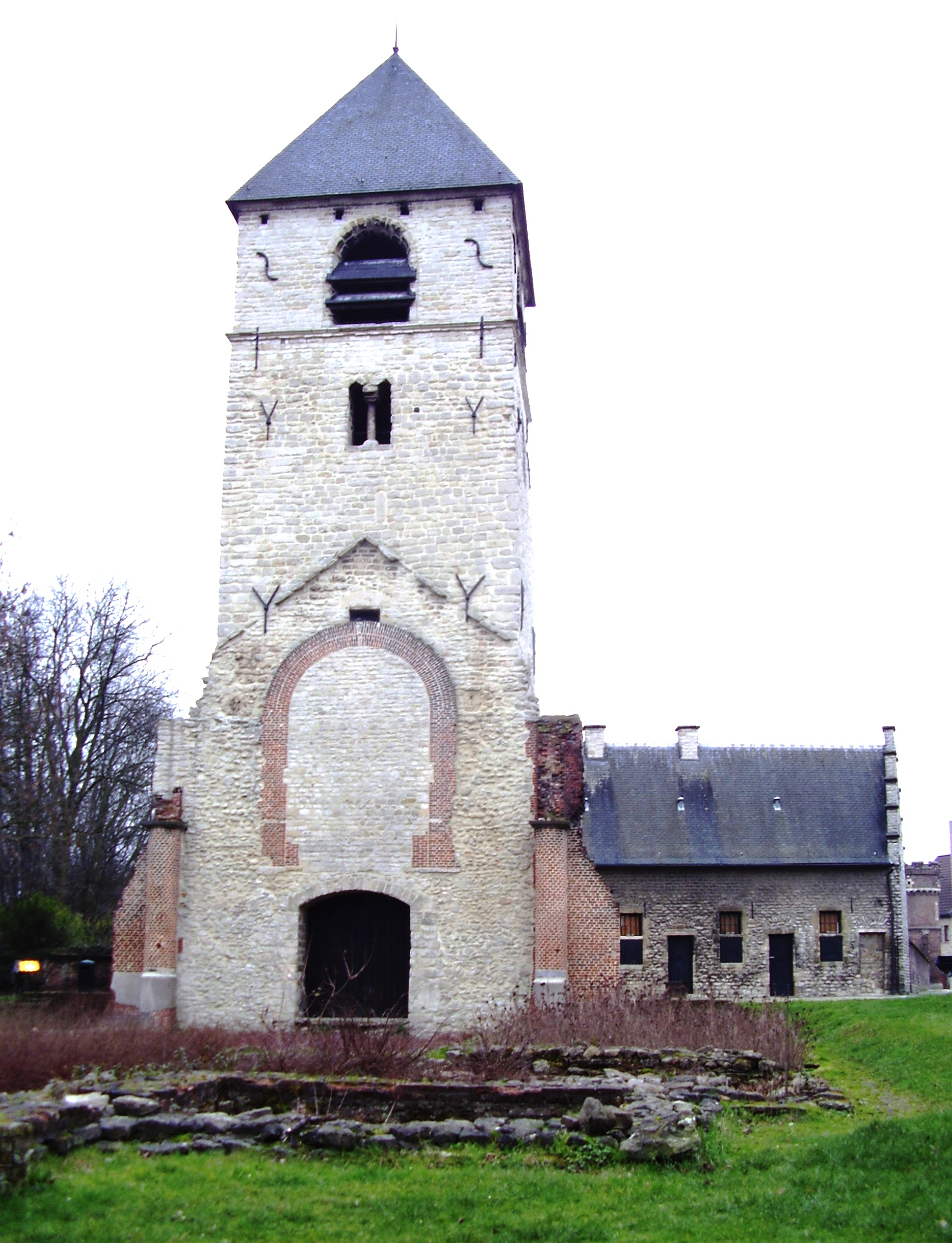
Romanesque tower of the Church of St. Peter and St. Paul in Lower Heembeek

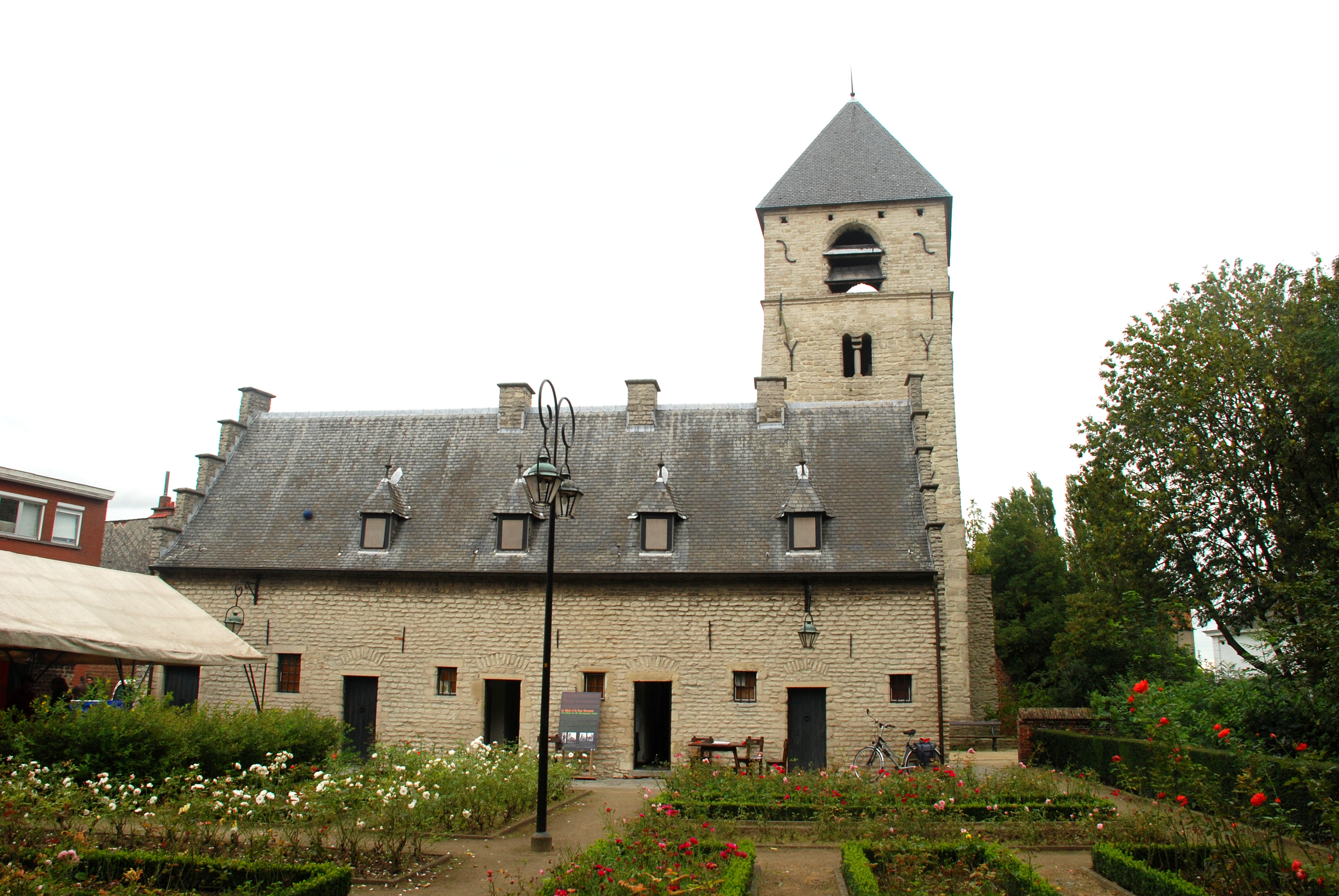
The "Kluis" and the tower of the Church of St. Peter and St. Paul in Lower Heembeek

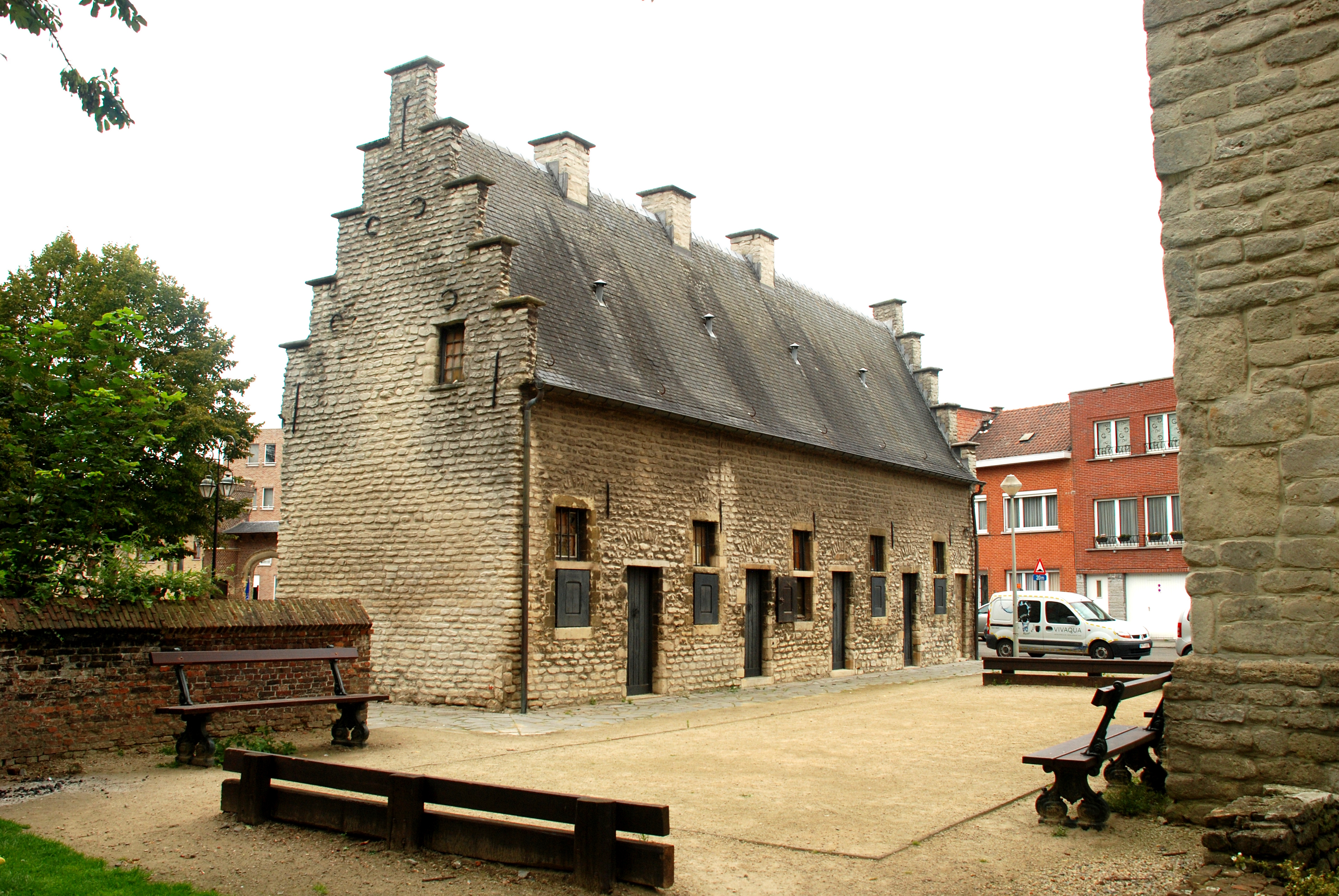
The "Kluis" in Lower Heembeek

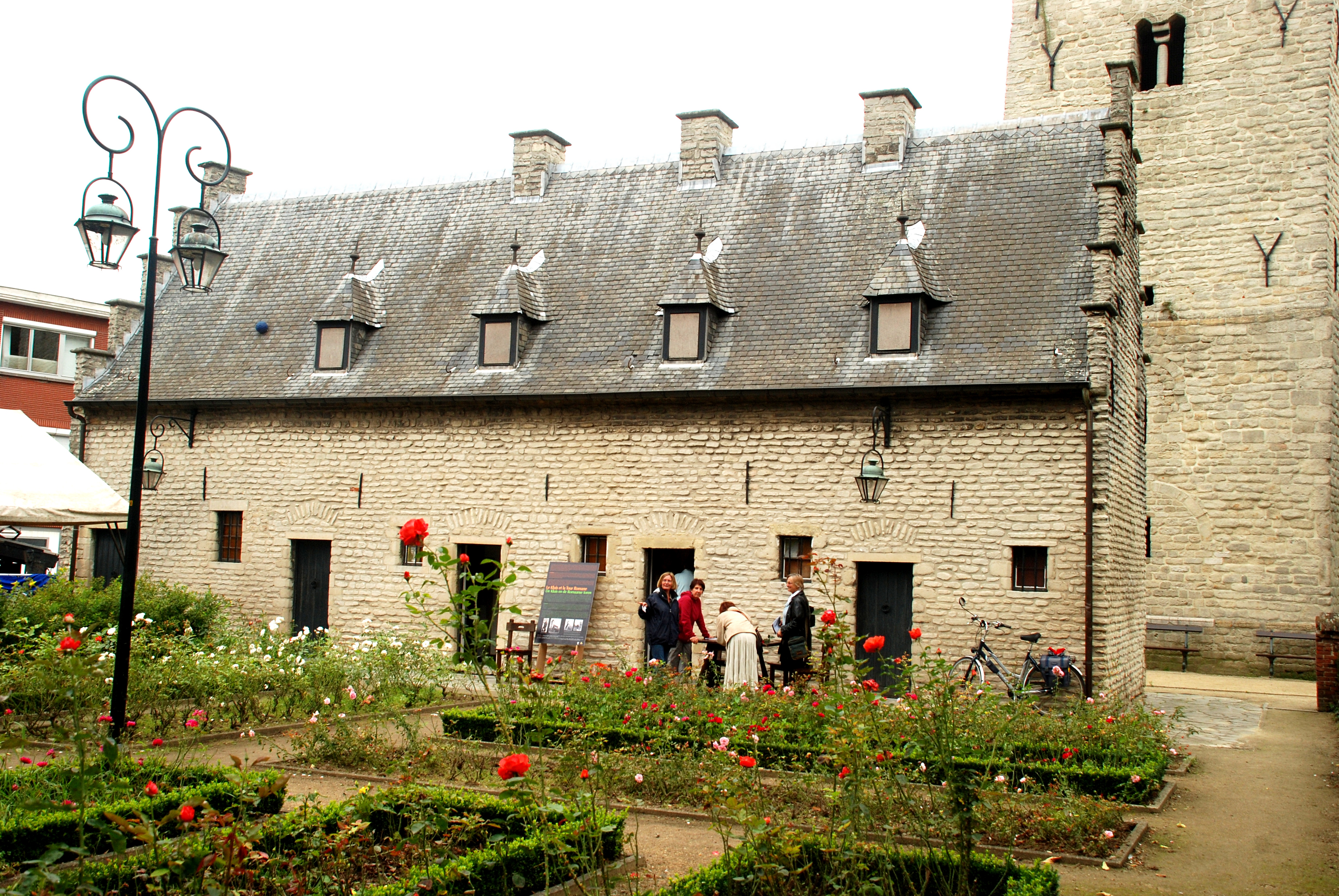
West side of the "Kluis"

== Notable residents ==
- Bert Anciaux (born 1959), politician
- Steven Vanackere (born 1964), politician

== See also ==
- Neighbourhoods in Brussels
- History of Brussels
- Belgium in the long nineteenth century
