= Gilles II de Busleyden =

Dutch viscount

Gilles II of Busleyden
- Other names: Buslidius
- Born: Gielis II van Busleyden c. 1465; Arlon, Burgundian Netherlands
- Died: 14 July 1536; Arlon, Habsburg Netherlands

Gilles II of Busleyden (French: Gilles II de Busleyden; Dutch: Gielis II van Busleyden) was a knight, viscount, and a correspondent of Desiderius Erasmus.

== Biography ==
Gilles II de Busleyden was born in Arlon into an old Luxembourg family from Bauschleyden. His father was Gilles I, and his mother was Jeanne Elisabeth de Mussey of Marville, Meuse. His brothers were François, Valérien, and Jérôme de Busleyden. Gilles II married Adrienne de Goudeval (or Gondeval), Viscountess of Grimbergen, and had around five children.

His father brought him to the court of Philip the Handsome, Duke of Burgundy, where he was appointed receiver for Luxembourg, Arlon, and Thionville on 20 March 1490. He resigned in 1498 in favor of his brother Valérien de Busleyden and became the first master of the Chamber of Accounts in Brabant, rising to president by 1510.

His wife Adrienne came into possession of the Horst Castle in 1521 until 1554. Giles held the title of Viscount of Grimbergen and was the Lord of Guirsch, Horst, Sint-Pieters-Rode, Kortrijk, and Thommen.

He inherited properties from his father in Bauschleyden. Gilles II represented the Busleyden family as an executor of the will of his brother Jérôme de Busleyden. In 1517, he helped execute his plan to establish the Collegium Buslidianum in Louvain. Gilles' exchanges with Desiderius Erasmus highlight Erasmus's advocacy to the Louvain faculty regarding the proposal and his attempts to recruit faculty for the available positions.

== Death ==
Gilles II de Busleyden died on 14 July 1536 in Arlon, Habsburg Netherlands (now Belgium). He was buried in the Church of St. Michael and St. Gudula (now Brussels' cathedral).
