= Gilles I de Busleyden =

Dutch knight

Gilles I of Busleyden
- Other names: Gilles van Bauschelt
- Born: Gilles de Busleyden; Burgundian Netherlands
- Died: c. 28 June 1499; Arlon, Habsburg Netherlands

Gilles I of Busleyden (French: Gilles de Busleyden; Dutch: Gielis van Busleyden) or Gilles van Bauschelt (died c. 28 June 1499) was knighted by Philip the Good and became a chamberlain of Charles the Bold.

== Biography ==
Originating from Bauschleyden, Gilles de Busleyden was born into a prominent Luxembourg family. He was the son of Jean de Busleyden, Lord of Busleyden (Bauschleyden), and Francoise de Brusfeld.

He married Jeanne Elisabeth de Mussey of Marville, Meuse. He had around several children and four sons which included: Gilles II, François de Busleyden, Jérôme de Busleyden, and Valerius (or Valérien de Busleyden).

From 1467 to 1473, he occupied the role of provost of Bauschleyden. He gained considerable wealth and acquired various lands, notably the lordship of Guirsch, with his castle nearly reaching the outskirts of Arlon. He later settled in Arlon where his third son Jérôme was born. He had a hand in building a parish church of Saint-Martin in Arlon, later destroyed in a fire.

Gilles received knighthood from Philip the Good and served as a chamberlain of Charles the Bold, Duke of Burgundy. In February 1471, in Bruges, Charles the Bold ennobled him. He served as a secretary clerk of the State of the Duchy of Luxembourg and was appointed on 24 December 1484, as a Councilor in the Chamber of the Council in Luxembourg.

== Death ==
Gilles de Busleyden died on c. 28 June 1499 in Arlon, Habsburg Netherlands (now Belgium).
