= Hof van Busleyden =

Palace in Mechelen

Busleyden Palace
- Hof van Busleyden
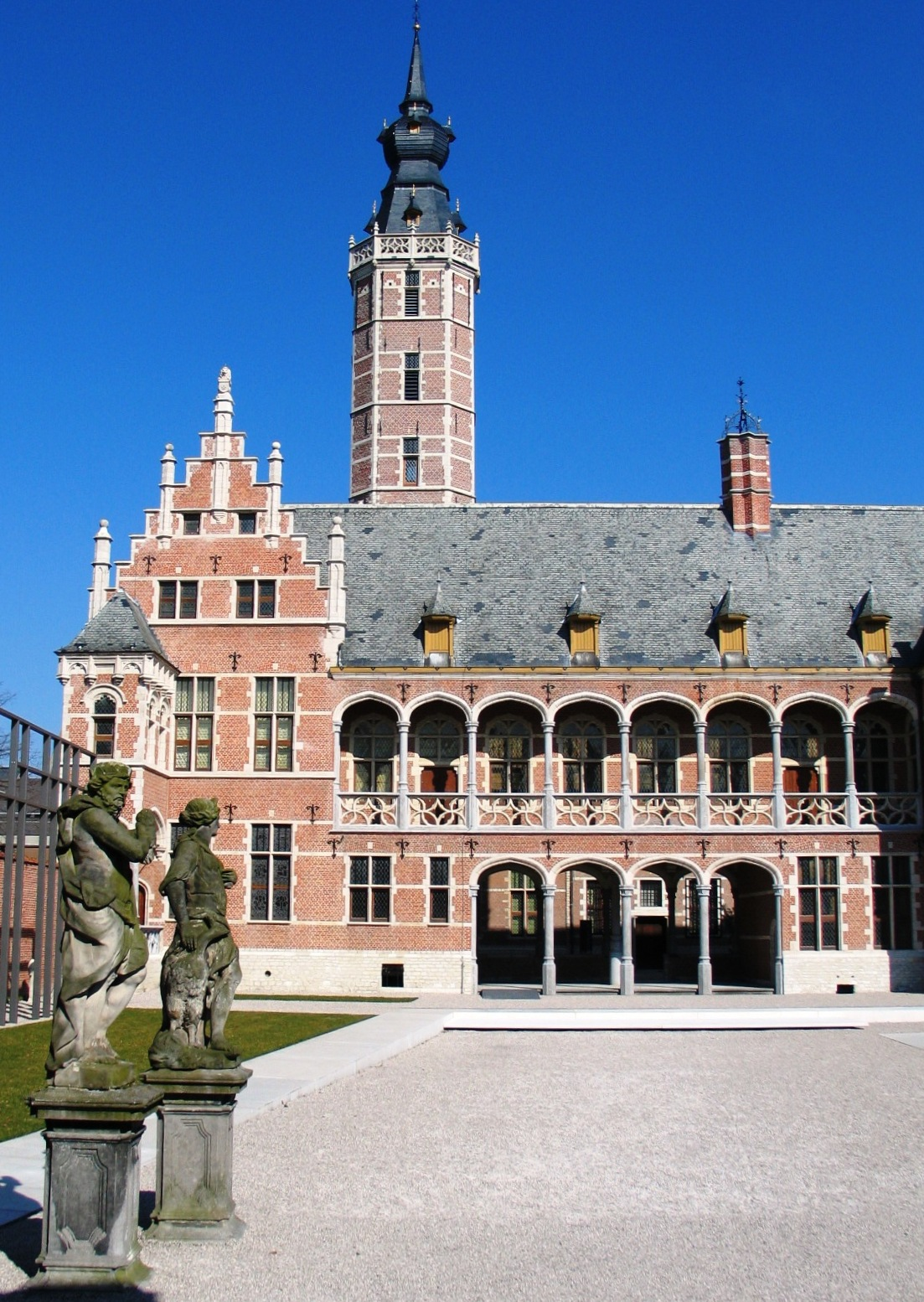

General information
- Location: Mechelen, Belgium
- Coordinates: 51°1′52″N 4°28′57″E

Design and construction
- Architect(s): Rombout II Keldermans

Hof van Busleyden (English: Court of Busleyden; Spanish: Palacio van Busleyden), also called the Busleyden Palace, is a palace in the municipality of Mechelen in the province of Antwerp in the Flemish Region of Belgium.

== History ==
In 1494, François de Busleyden purchased the land for the Hof van Busleyden in Mechelen. In 1496, the city granted him land adjoined to his residence in recognition of his services. Upon François's death in 1502, his estate was inherited by his three brothers. His brother Hieronymus van Busleyden commissioned architect Rombout II Keldermans who carried out the plan's for the construction beginning in 1503 and ending in 1507.

== See also ==
Media related to Hof van Busleyden at Wikimedia Commons

== Gallery ==
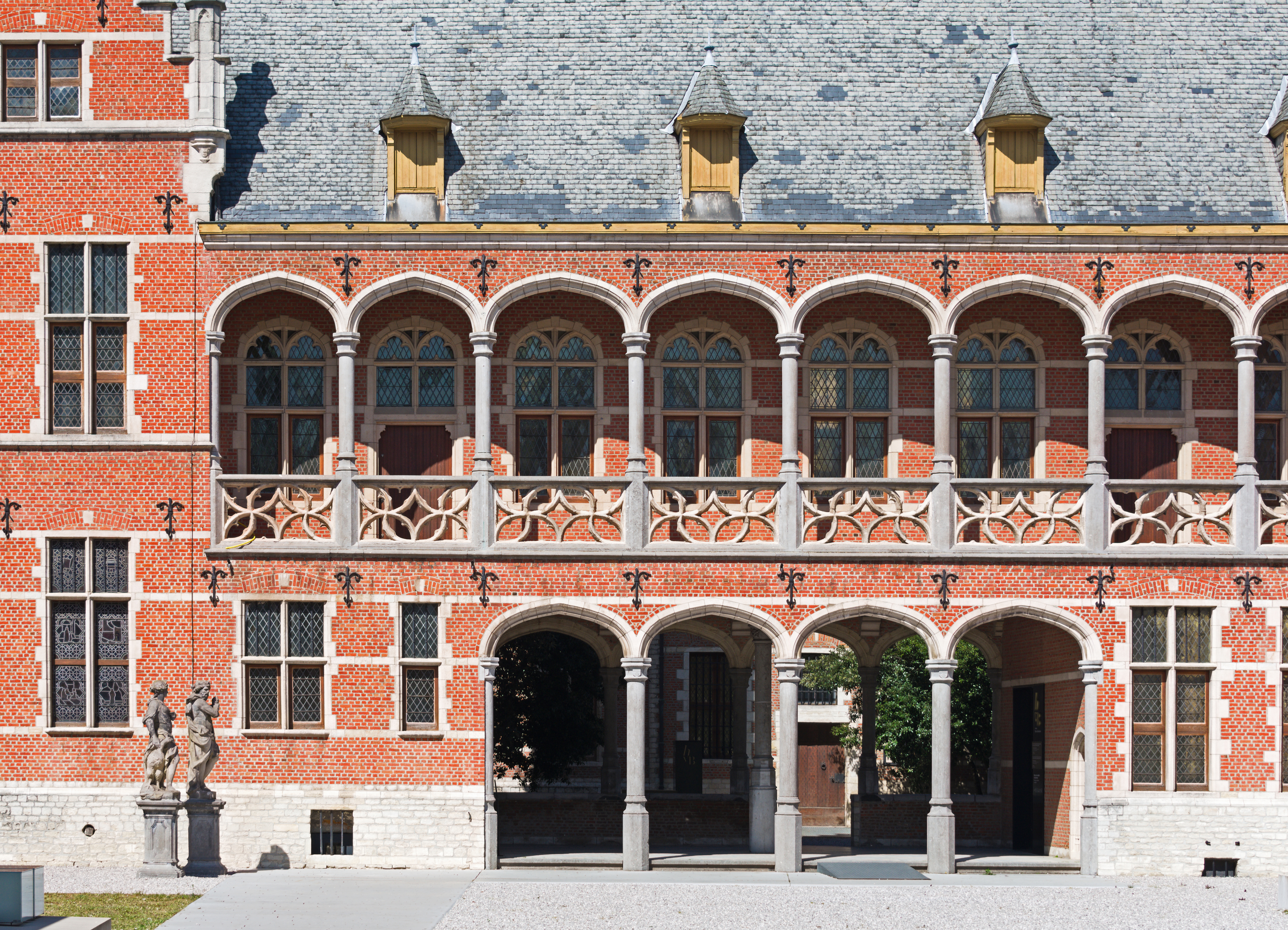
Hof van Busleyden, Mechelen
