= Horst Castle =

Castle in Gelsenkirchen, Germany

Coordinates: 51°32′11.1″N 7°1′33.6″E

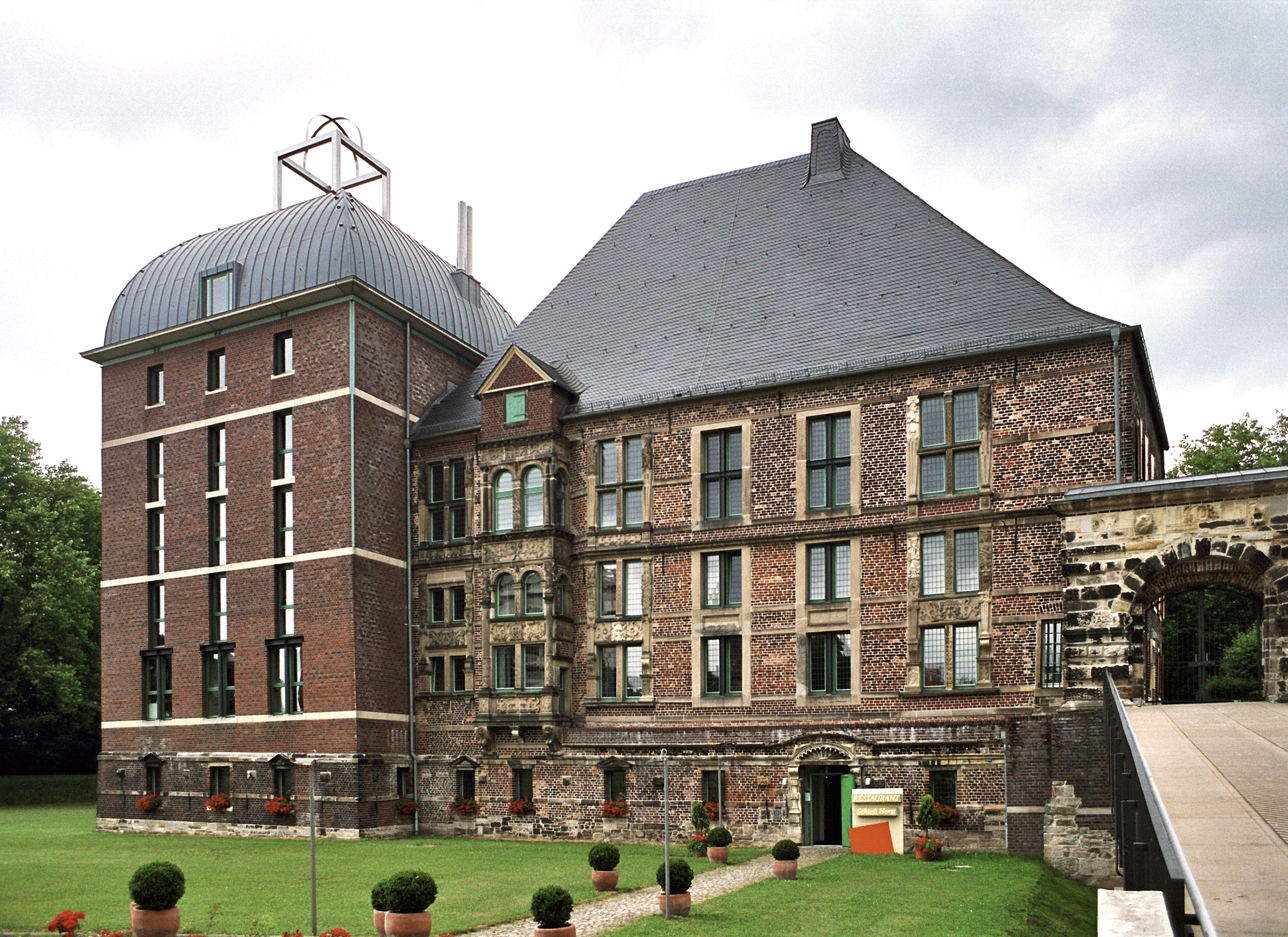
Preserved entrance wing of Horst Castle with northern corner tower

Horst Castle (German: Schloss Horst), located in the Horst district of Gelsenkirchen, is recognized as one of Westphalia's oldest and most significant Renaissance buildings. During its construction in the 16th century, it ranked among the largest four-winged castle complexes north of the Alps, significantly influencing the architectural style of the Lippe Renaissance. On 15 December 1983 it was declared a listed building.

== Overview ==
As early as the 11th century, a farmstead was situated on an island in the marshy area between two arms of the Emscher. Its inhabitants possibly fished for the Emscherbrücher thick heads native to the Emscherbruch quarry. Over time, this evolved into a castle complex that faced two devastating fires. In the aftermath of the second fire, the owner at the time, Rütger von der Horst, chose to rebuild the castle fully, resulting in its completion in 1578. The Renaissance building is of great significance to art history on a supra-regional level due to its architectural sculptures.

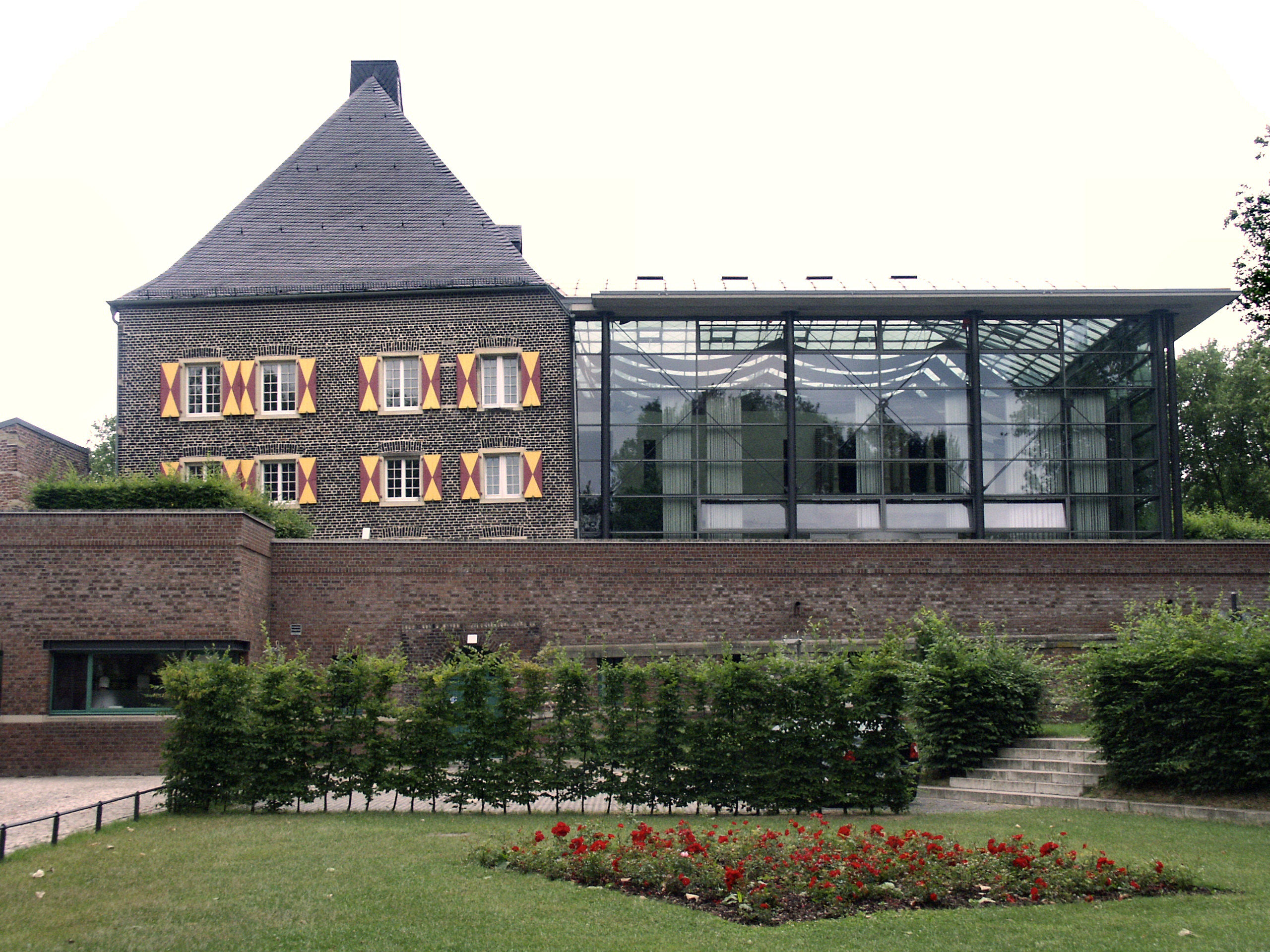
View of the castle from the southwest; on the right the modern glass hall

In the 19th century, the castle suffered significant damage due to dilapidation, resulting in large parts being either collapsed or demolished. The von Fürstenberg family, owner of the castle at the time, attempted to salvage the valuable façade decoration and high-quality architectural sculptures, referred to as the stone treasure, by storing the fragments. The few remnant sections of the structure that were not demolished deteriorated over time. In 1985, a group of citizens founded an initiative to prevent the castle's ruin and explore potential long-term uses for the site. At their request, Gelsenkirchen purchased Horst Castle and conducted extensive historical and archaeological investigations. Currently, the castle is one of the most well-researched examples of Renaissance architecture in North-West Germany. Following restoration and partial reconstruction, it serves as a museum, restaurant, registry office, and event venue.

== History ==
=== Residents and owners ===
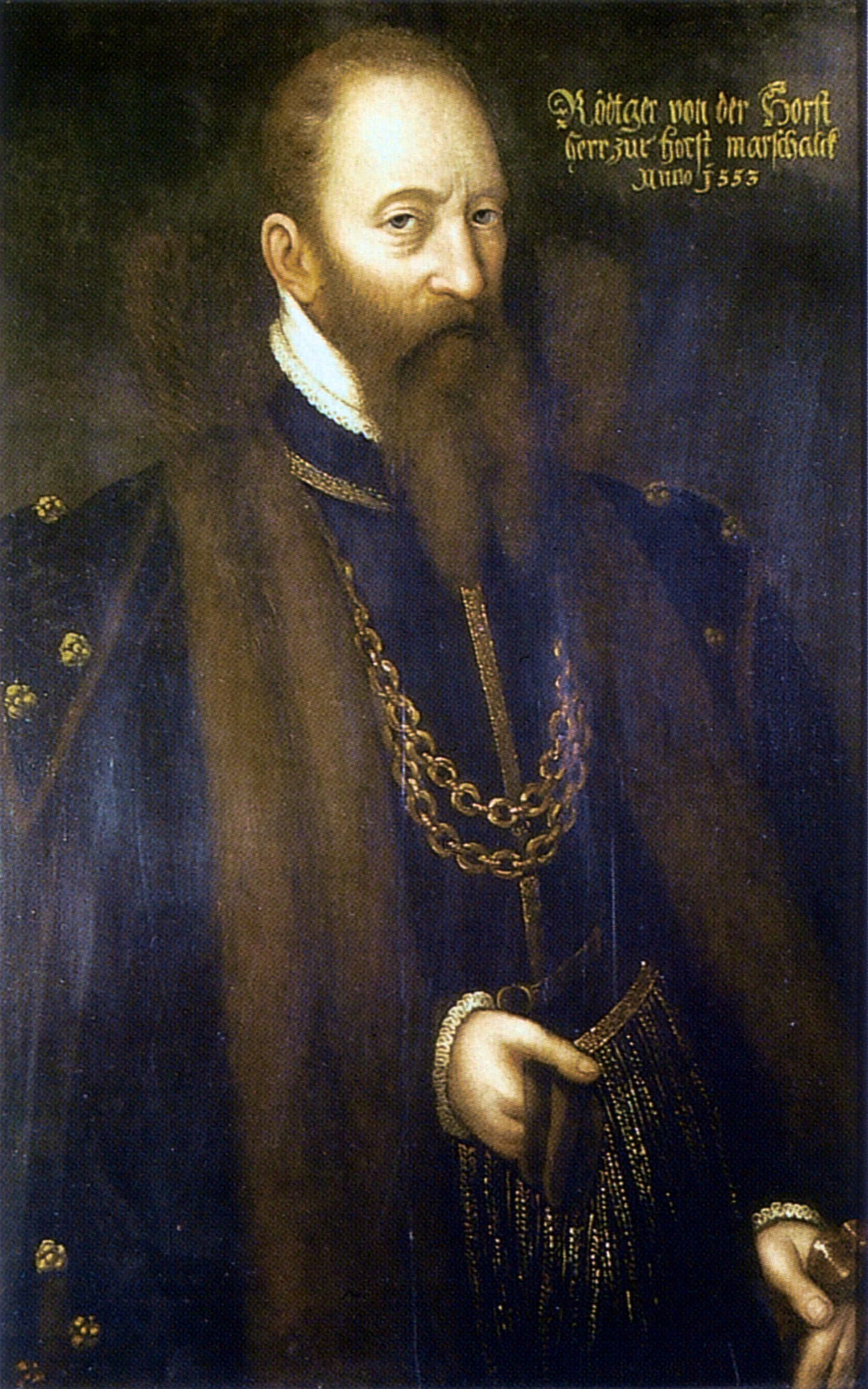
The builder Rütger von der Horst hired well-known artists and craftsmen of his time to build his new castle; Portrait by an unknown artist from around 1553

The noble lineage of the Horst Lords dates back to the 12th century, originating from what is now Essen. Starting around 1200, the dynasty's members were marshals of the Essen Abbey, associated with overseeing the game in the Emscherbruch area and the privilege of capturing Emscherbruch horses. Since 1363, they have been referenced as feudatories of the Counts of Cleves and successfully maintained their property's independence against the nearby Archbishopric of Cologne for an extended period. However, the knights of Horst had taken jurisdiction over the parishes of Gladbeck and Buer, which were part of the Electorate of Cologne's territory. Therefore, in 1410/11, the Archbishop of Cologne, Friedrich of Saarwerden, initiated legal proceedings against them. Consequently, the family had to comply with the archbishopric in 1412. Rütger von der Horst swore allegiance to the Archbishop of Cologne, which led to the incorporation of the once-independent lordship into the Vest Recklinghausen of the archbishopric. He was granted the lordship as a fief of the Electorate of Cologne in exchange for his services. With the annexation of Horst to the territory of Cologne, the efforts of the Counts of the Mark and the Counts of Berg to acquire Horst Castle or at least secure a right to open it, which were documented at least in 1315 and 1349, had finally failed.

The castle's builder, also named Rütger, inherited sole possession of the Hues zor Horst on 21 May 1547. He served as marshal under six Cologne electors, and Archbishop Salentin von Isenburg appointed him governor of Cologne in the Vest Recklinghausen shortly before his abdication. Rütger oversaw the construction of a new building on the site of the old castle but died only four years after the construction's completion in 1578. Rütger's heiress daughter, Margarethe, transferred the castle to the von Loë family of Palsterkamp und Geist through her marriage in 1582. The new castle lord, Bertram von Loë, also left no male heir. Sibylla, one of his two daughters, inherited Horst Castle, and the estate, which she brought as a dowry into her marriage to Dietrich von der Recke in 1607.

On 9 June 1706, a descendant of Dietrich von der Recke, Baron Hermann Dietrich von der Recke, sold the castle and estate of Horst to Baron Ferdinand von Fürstenberg for approximately 100,000 Reichstaler. Hermann Dietrich's nephew contested the sale and brought the matter before the Imperial Chamber Court. The trial did not conclude until 1802. The Fürstenberg family was required to pay 76,000 thalers in compensation to Count of Westerholt-Gysenberg, to whom the claims had meanwhile been transferred. The von Fürstenbergs never used the estate as a permanent residence, preferring to reside in one of the family's numerous other castles, including Herdringen Castle, Schellenberg Castle, or Adolfsburg Castle. In 1730, Christian von Fürstenberg ultimately dissolved the Horst household. In the subsequent years, the outer castle was leased for agricultural purposes, while a rent master managed the castle.

From the 1920s onwards, the site was repurposed as a public recreation center. In the 1970s, a discotheque was added to the café established in the basement at the time. At the start of 1985, a citizens' initiative was established, advocating for the preservation and new use of the historic building. Plans were developed to establish a training center, hotel, or dance sports center in Schloss Horst. In 1988, the city of Gelsenkirchen acquired the castle ruins for DM 650,000 and had them partially rebuilt.

=== Architectural history ===
==== Predecessor buildings ====
Archaeological excavations on the castle grounds indicate the existence of a farmstead at the site of the Horst outer bailey during the 11th and 12th centuries. This consisted of a six to seven-metre-wide and eleven to twelve-metre-long post-and-beam house with two rooms, which traces of posts and sill beacons can verify. The construction and furnishings of the house, as well as the remains of tiled stoves and finds from the former inventory - including shards of blue glass with white thread - indicate that the inhabitants of the house were not simple peasants, but of a higher class. In the late 12th century, this farmstead was expanded - likely at the behest of the Essen Abbey - by Gerhard von der Horst into a wooden fortification known as a motte, serving to secure the abbey's borders and protect its farms in the region. The motte was built using an artificial earth mound with a nearly 40-metre diameter and nearly two-metre height. During that period, the castle comprised a principal building, a polygonal tower measuring 6 to 6.5 metres in diameter, and two additional wooden outbuildings located at the base of the hill. These structures were surrounded by a parapet wall with battlements, while a moat in front of the castle was fortified with another palisade. Moreover, the Horst complex included an outer bailey situated to the west of the core castle, and this area was joined to the latter by a bridge.

Not long after its construction, this wooden tower hill fort was destroyed by fire. The catastrophic fire may have occurred during the turmoil following the assassination of Cologne's Archbishop Engelbert von Berg in 1225. Gerhard von der Horst then replaced the remains of the wooden/earth fortification with a solid stone house measuring 11 × 7.5 metres or a residential tower with 1.2 metre thick walls and had the building surrounded by a curtain wall. The castle mound had previously been raised by at least 1.5 metres.

Horst House was first mentioned in a document as a castle in 1282, when the Roman-German King Rudolf von Habsburg allowed the knight Arnold of Horst to further fortify the freedom located next to his "castrum horst" (castrum = castle; also spelt hoirst, hurst and hoerst in old documents), which was surrounded by a moat, and granted this settlement town rights at the same time. Nothing remains of this former freedom today; it disappeared in the course of industrialisation during construction and transport projects. It was located roughly where Horster Burgstrasse runs today.

In 1295, a chaplain for Horst was mentioned, suggesting the presence of a castle chapel. Excavations in the outer castle area revealed that this chapel had already existed in the preceding century, as the excavators discovered 1.5-meter-thick foundations of a chapel whose origins dated back to the 12th century. The first Horst castle chapel was a hall of approximately 13 × 15 meters with an apsidally closed choir. The nave's clear width was 6.6 × 4.2 meters. A document from 1411 names Saint Hippolytus as its patron saint, reflecting the Lords of Horst's association with the horse industry, a significant source of income. Below the choir was a crypt-like substructure with four burial chambers, presumably for members of the castle lord's family. The chapel was remodelled in the late Middle Ages, receiving a vault and an enlarged polygonal building to replace its choir. Extensions were also added to the northeast side. Presumably in 1590, the Horst chapel was elevated to parish church status. It stood in the outer bailey until 1753 when it was succeeded by the present church of St. Hippolytus.

The castle underwent gradual extensions, similar to the castle chapel. These brick extensions and additions were added within the curtain wall, likely in the 15th century or at the latest, in the first half of the 16th century. Extensive excavations unveiled a two-storey brick building (16 × 10 metres), a round tower, and numerous other structures in the gate area of the complex, including the extended residential tower, now 19 × 11 metres in size. To create the necessary space, some of these buildings were built on pile grates in the castle moats. The roofs of the buildings were covered with clay and slate shingles. The state of the castle in the 16th century is likely documented by a sandstone relief that was previously embedded in the right-hand side of the restaurant entrance.

==== Renaissance new building ====
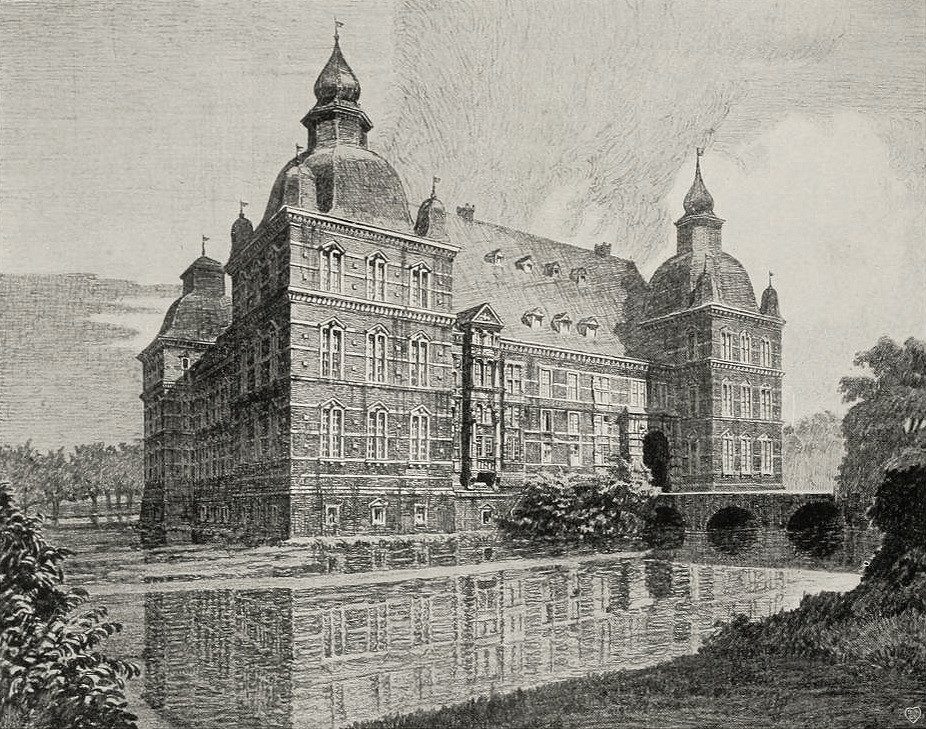
Reconstruction of the castle during the Renaissance

After Rütger von der Horst took ownership of the castle in 1549, he described the complex as desolate and of poor appearance ("Item so ych myne behusynge gans woste und ungestalt yn myner bestetnyß gehadt" - "Likewise, I have taken my dwelling into my possession completely neglected and run-down"). He initiated construction work that lasted until 1553, although it remains unclear whether these were necessary repairs or involved extensions and alterations. When Horst Castle was once again destroyed by fire in the spring of 1554, Rütger chose not to rebuild it but instead had the remains of his father's castle demolished. He commissioned the construction of a moated castle, intended to meet the high living and representation standards of the Vestian governor. The initial financing for this expensive project came from his mother-in-law's inheritance, Elisabeth of Palandt. From 1571 onwards, Rütger funded the interior design of his castle using the proceeds from his lucrative investment in a salt and peat company based in West Frisia.

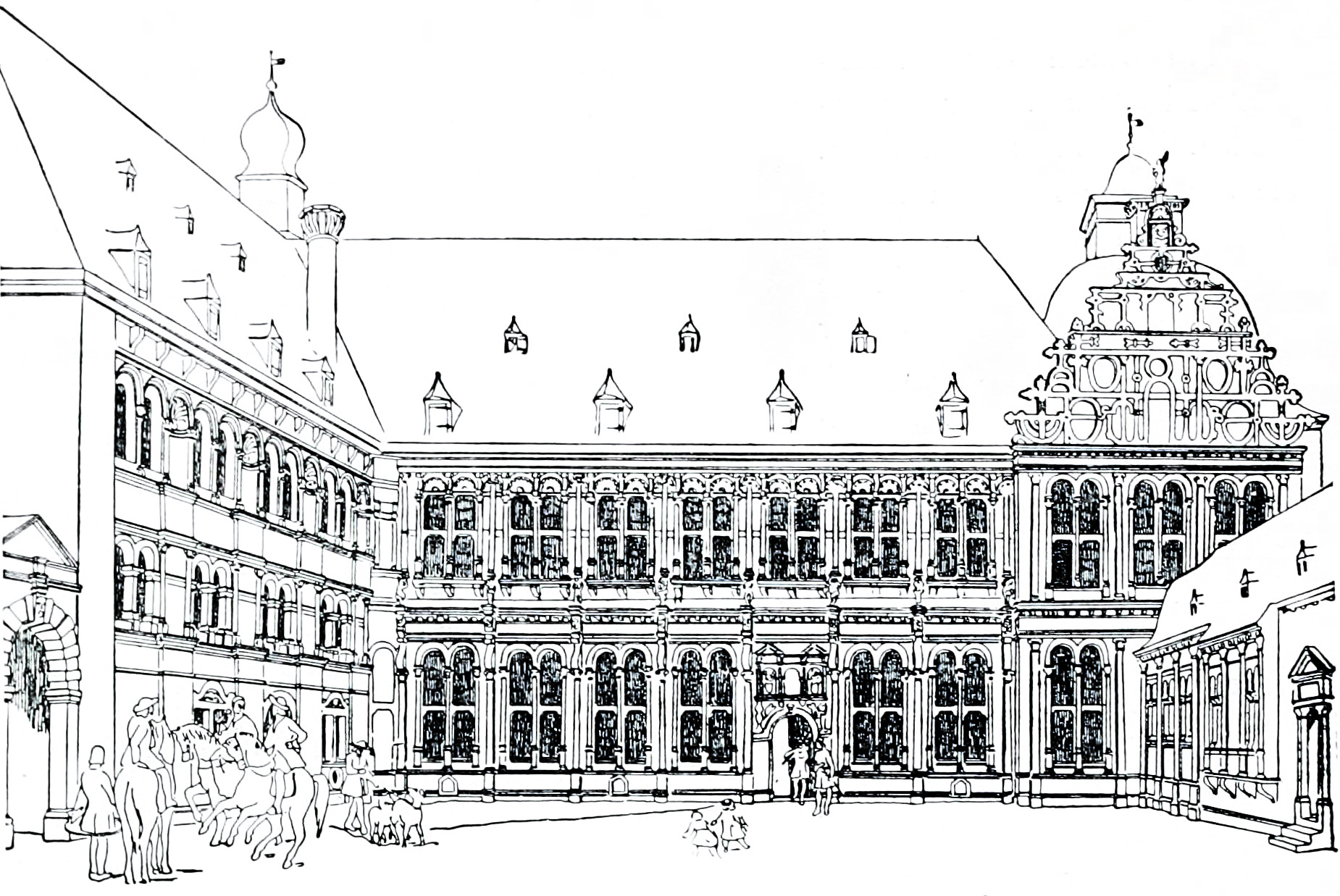
Renaissance courtyard facade of the castle, drawing by Gustav Greiß

The progress of the construction and the individuals involved in this new building are recorded in Rütger von der Horst's building diaries. These include two account books and a bundle of 47 building contracts in Low German, covering the period from 1554 to 1567. By 1558 at the latest, the master builder was Arnt Johannsen to Boecop, the town architect of Arnhem. The client had met him in Arnhem, where he had worked for a distant relative of Rütger, the Geldrian military commander Maarten van Rossum. According to Johannsen's plans, a closed four-wing complex was to be built, with slightly projecting square corner towers topped with Welsh bonnets, a feature unusual for that time. Three of the four sides were to be occupied by two- or three-story wings, while a low, single-story wing was planned for the fourth side to ensure adequate brightness in the castle courtyard. However, only a three-story entrance wing in the northwest and a two-story residential wing with an adjoining hipped roof in the northeast were ultimately built. The planned multi-storey southeast wing ultimately only became a three-axis risalit, whose splendidly designed volute gable was decorated with fittings and modelled on Flemish designs.

Construction on the northwest wing initiated in 1558, including a courtyard gallery, was completed in 1559, as evidenced by a date on the courtyard façade. Work on the residential wing commenced as early as 1554 and continued until 1563. By 1563, the outer structure of the wing was completed. In 1564, work began on its façade, and it received its roof in the same year. Disagreements between the client and Arnt Johannsen led Rütger von der Horst to involve other craftsmen more extensively in the planning of his castle, and the Arnhem resident eventually left the building site in 1567. Laurenz von Brachum, a native of Wesel, had assumed some of his responsibilities since 1563/64 when he started as a stonemason on the Horst building site on 23 September 1558. He was tasked with the final design of the courtyard façades and the ornamental gable on the northeast wing. Von Brachum received assistance from Heinrich Vernukken from Kalkar and his son Wilhelm for the sculptural decoration of the castle, influenced by the Dutch Mannerist style. They were responsible for the figurative decoration, coats of arms, and inscriptions, as well as the interior design commission. Wilhelm Vernukken was also involved in designing the façade. The preserved bay window on the entrance wing's street side was designed by him. The intricate sculptural decorations and friezes, showcasing numerous detailed and unique ornaments and reliefs, gave birth to the art-historical term Lippe Renaissance. Since the 1920s, Horst's elaborate architectural sculpture and ornamentation have been regarded as a stone treasure.

In 1567, the external construction of the first two wings of the castle was completed. Previous publications suggested that the remaining, younger wings of the building had a different appearance because they were constructed under the direction of the Frenchman Joist de la Cour. However, the construction diaries do not provide any evidence for this assumption, as contemporary records indicate that de la Cour had only been responsible for painting work from 1563 onwards. The interiors featured an elaborate color scheme. During restoration work, remnants of figurative and ornamental paintings were discovered in several rooms, including a large history painting on canvas in the Knights' Hall. By 1570, the two remaining wings of the complex were also completed, and work on the interior of the palace continued until 1573.

In the course of the new construction, Rütger von der Horst also planned to remodel the outer bailey, but this failed due to opposition from the church.

==== Modern times to the present ====
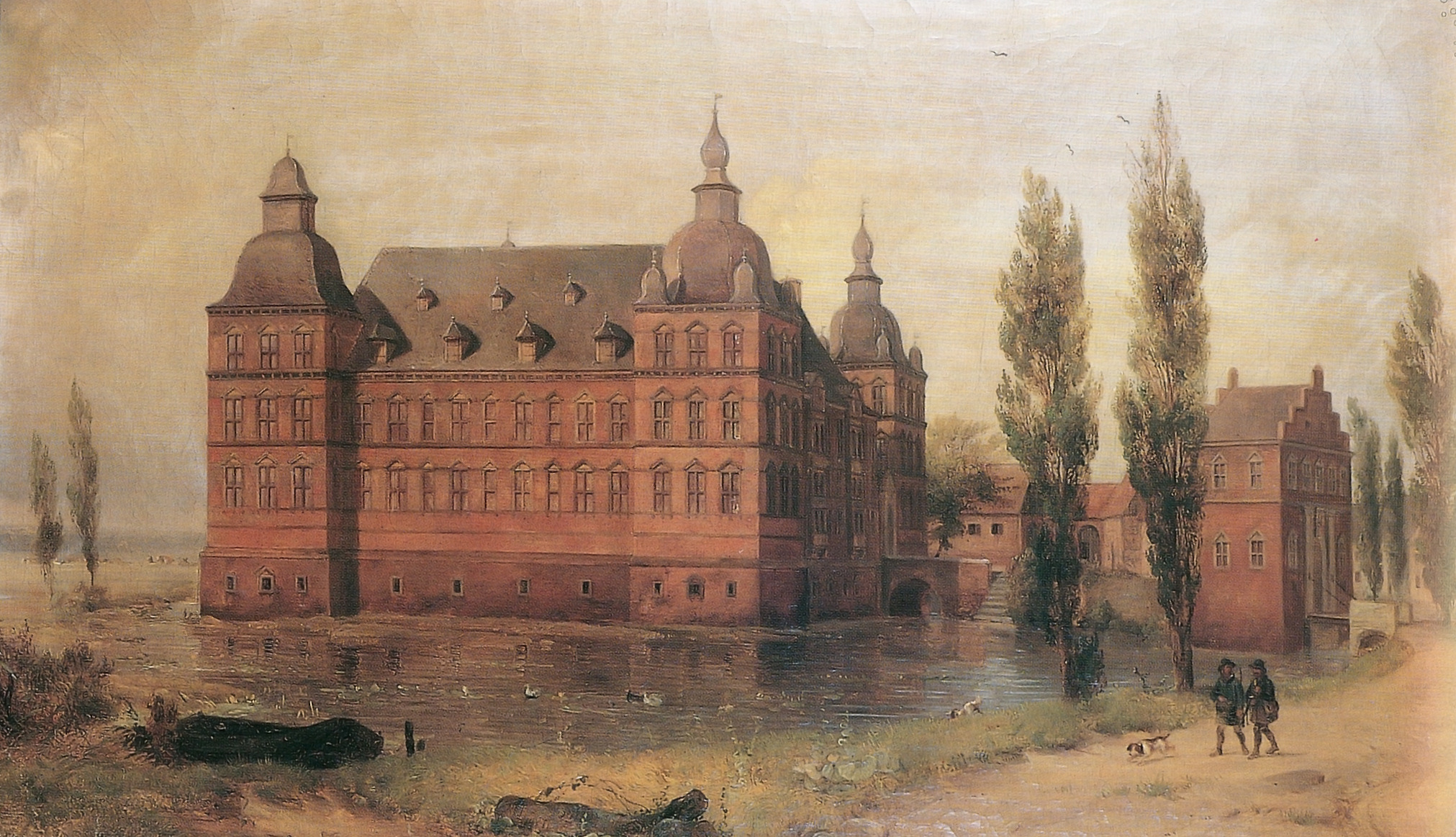
Horst Castle in an oil painting by Adolf Höninghaus from 1842; However, it does not represent the state of construction at the time, because the picture shows the west tower, which collapsed twelve years earlier, still intact.

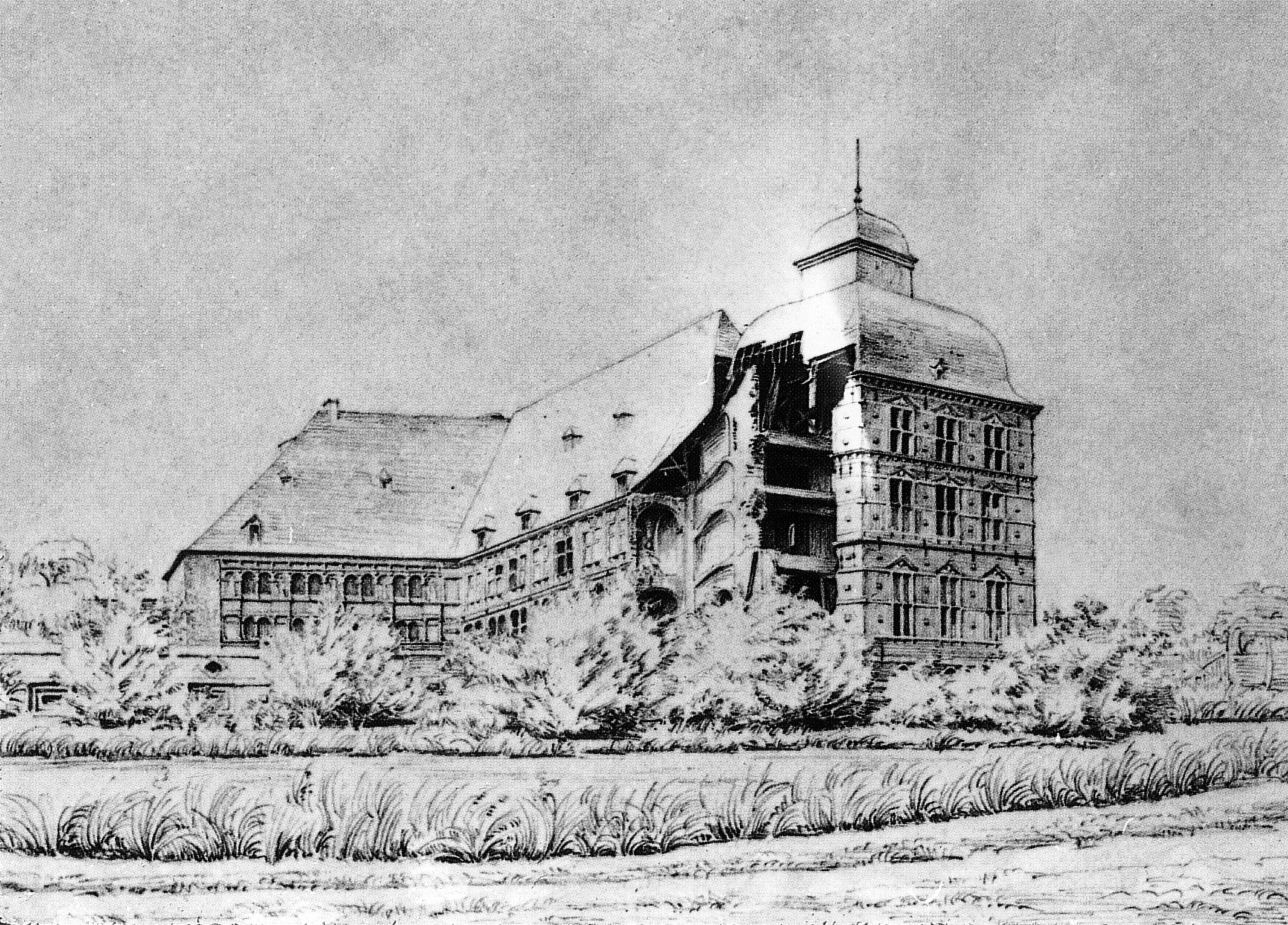
Horst Castle 1850 shortly after the grand gable on the east tower collapsed, drawing by Gustav Greiß

There were early signs that the building fabric was deteriorating, mainly due to the structurally unsuitable building ground in the former moat of the previous complex and the inadequate foundations of the castle building. After acquiring the complex, the barons of Fürstenberg had extensive repair and renovation work carried out between 1706 and 1721, much of it due to the acute risk of collapse. For instance, in 1711/12, a part of the courtyard façade of the manor house wing was demolished and rebuilt. The foundations were repaired in 1716, and in 1721, the northern corner tower's upper part underwent partial demolition and reconstruction. Nevertheless, the complex gradually decayed despite all attempts made by the owners. The gatehouse was demolished in 1828. Subsequently, the castle was repaired by Heinrich Johann Freyse, an Essen-based architect, in 1828/29. He was also tasked with remodelling the castle in the style of the time. His plans consisted of transforming the castle into a classicist-style three-winged complex. Although his plans entailed the complete removal of the Renaissance façade embellishments, the work was never completed. Just before 1830, the western tower crumbled, causing damage to the northwest wing. The wing was subsequently shortened by removing the gateway entirely. It is likely that the remains of the tower were completely cleared during the work. In the spring of 1833, the north tower collapsed and was subsequently demolished to the basement level. The south tower collapsed on Christmas Eve 1843. Around this time, the two low castle wings on the southeast and southwest sides were also demolished. Before 1850, the Vernukken bay window on the entrance front lost its original gable when pigeon lofts were to be housed in the wing's attic, and all the floor's window openings were closed off for this purpose. During the demolition, the Fürstenberg family made efforts to preserve the valuable architectural decoration, and most of it was stored in a specially built shed until 1925. King Frederick William IV of Prussia's plans to purchase the stone decoration from Horst House during the mid-19th century resulted in 23 pictorial representations of the palace, known as the Potsdamer Blätter. These were created by the Frankfurt architectural draughtsman Karl Gustav Greiß, who had been commissioned to make an inventory. However, because negotiations conducted between 1848 and 1851 regarding the sale of the façade decorations were unsuccessful, the "Stone Treasure" remained at Horst.

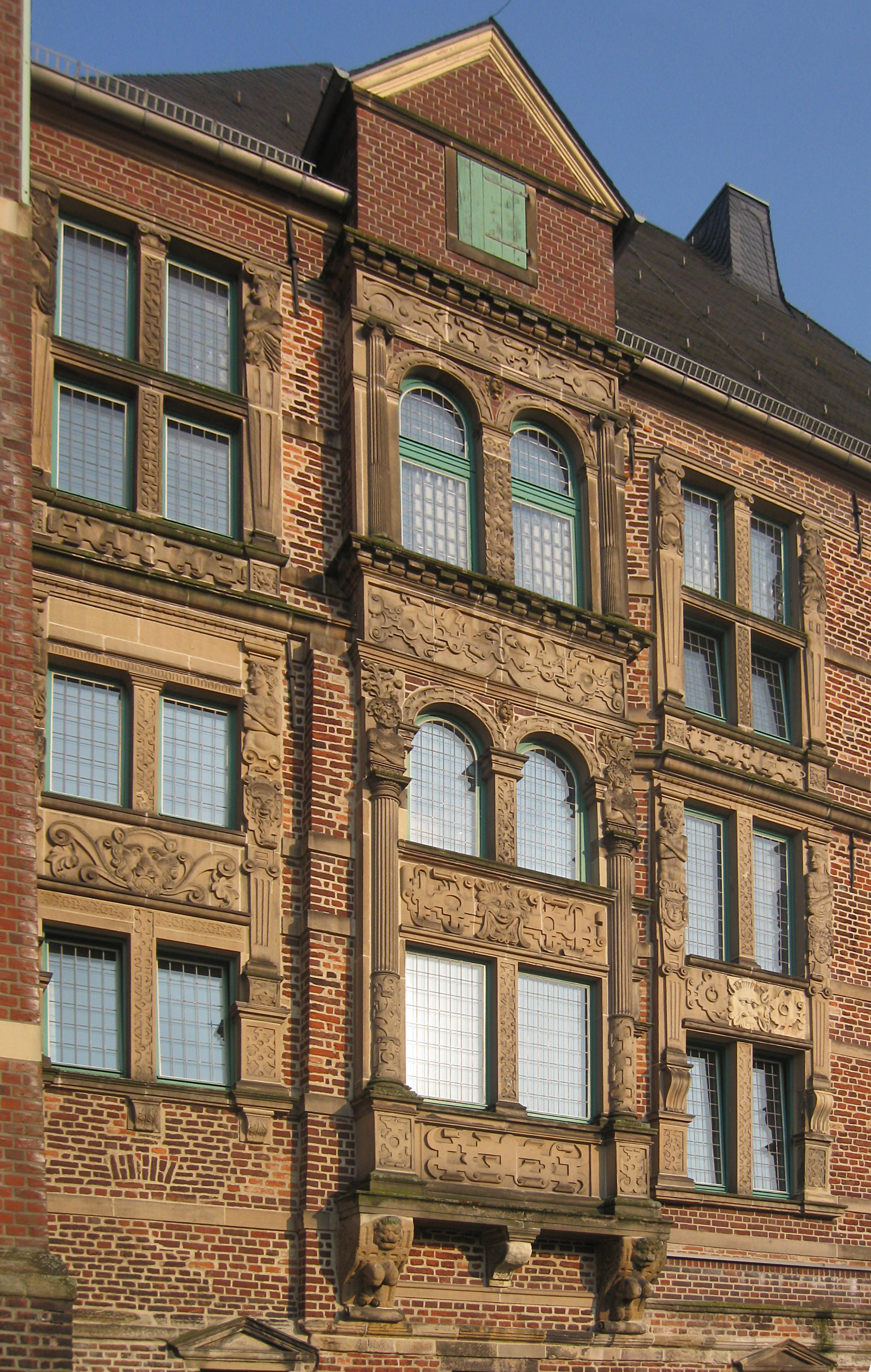
The bay window of the entrance wing by Wilhelm Vernukken

By order of the Prussian Regional Council in Münster, the eastern tower with walls up to 2.2 meters thick and the adjacent residential wing were demolished in 1853/54. The agricultural outer bailey was also partially demolished in the 19th century, leaving only the entrance wing and an extension of the former residential wing, along with the foundations of the associated corner tower. These parts of Horst Castle were transformed into a public recreation area between 1924 and 1930. As part of this, the basement of the manor house wing, which had been filled in during the 19th century to protect the building's status, was uncovered, and a restaurant was established in the vaulted cellars according to plans by the architect Paul Sültenfuß. In addition to other interior modifications, this included the construction of an extension in the corner of the two remaining castle wings. The former castle kitchen in the entrance wing served as a small museum, exhibiting the "Stone Treasure." Simultaneously, the castle park was transformed into an English-style landscape garden and opened to the public. During this redesign, the large pond was converted into a geometric moat that encircled the palace on three sides, now recognizable only as a lawn depression.

In 1976, a discotheque followed the restaurant, but none of the tenants contributed to the preservation of the historic structure, leading to its increasing decay. Restoration work on the street façade of the entrance wing was undertaken for the first time between 1962 and 1967, with the support of the state conservator. Most of the architectural decoration made of Baumberg sandstone had been replaced by reconstructions in the less sensitive Wrexen sandstone. Only a few originals remained well-preserved and were not replaced but renewed. However, the work was only able to counteract the further decline of the complex to a limited extent. In 1984, the courtyard-side façade of the entrance wing underwent conservation treatment in order to halt the considerable decay of the stone.

At the urging of the Horst Castle Support Association, founded in 1985, the city of Gelsenkirchen purchased the compound in 1988 with funding from the state of North Rhine-Westphalia to prevent its total decay. Initially, the plan was to merge all three registry offices in Gelsenkirchen Castle and redesign the interior to house multiple municipal offices, along with a new staircase and lift in the entrance wing. However, these plans were never fulfilled. From the spring of 1990, the Westphalian Museum of Archaeology carried out systematic excavations on the castle grounds and in the outer bailey area. As the authority for the preservation of archaeological monuments of the Regional Association of Westfalen-Lippe, the museum not only uncovered archaeological finds but also produced new insights into the complex's building history. For instance, the excavators discovered remains of the previous edifice and an innovative water and waste management infrastructure comprising a tank, well, and various pits and shafts, some of which were multi-tiered. In 1992, an architectural competition was held upon the suggestion of the Friends' Association. The winning design by Frankfurt architect Jochem Jourdan was employed to renovate the palace from 1994 to 1999 and partially reconstruct it, integrating some of the existing historical building components. During the construction work, which received financial assistance from the North Rhine-Westphalian state government and cost approximately £10 million, extensions and additions from the 20th century were also eliminated.

=== Current utilisation ===
Today, Horst Castle serves as a cultural center and registry office for the city of Gelsenkirchen. It has also been home to the district administration of Gelsenkirchen-West since 1995. The Oriel room is used by the local debt counselling service, among others. The basement of the castle is home to a restaurant, while the restored fireplace room of the entrance wing, which has served as the castle kitchen since the 17th century, is now used as a wedding hall. The covered inner courtyard of the complex can be rented for events and serves as a venue for temporary exhibitions. The permanent exhibition of the castle museum is housed in the corridors, on the ground floor of the south tower and on the reconstructed upper floor of the manor house wing. In addition to parts of the façade decorations saved by the barons of Fürstenberg, it shows pieces of the architectural decoration of portals and fireplaces as well as the excavation finds made on the castle grounds. Together with other exhibits, the exhibition documents life and work in the Renaissance period, with a particular focus on the operation of the large construction site for the building of Horst Castle. Once a month, Horst Castle and its museum can be visited as part of a free public guided tour.

After four years of conversion and renovation work, the outer castle buildings dating from 1856 have been used as a community centre and district library since 2013. There is also a small printing museum.

== Description ==
=== The castle during the Renaissance ===
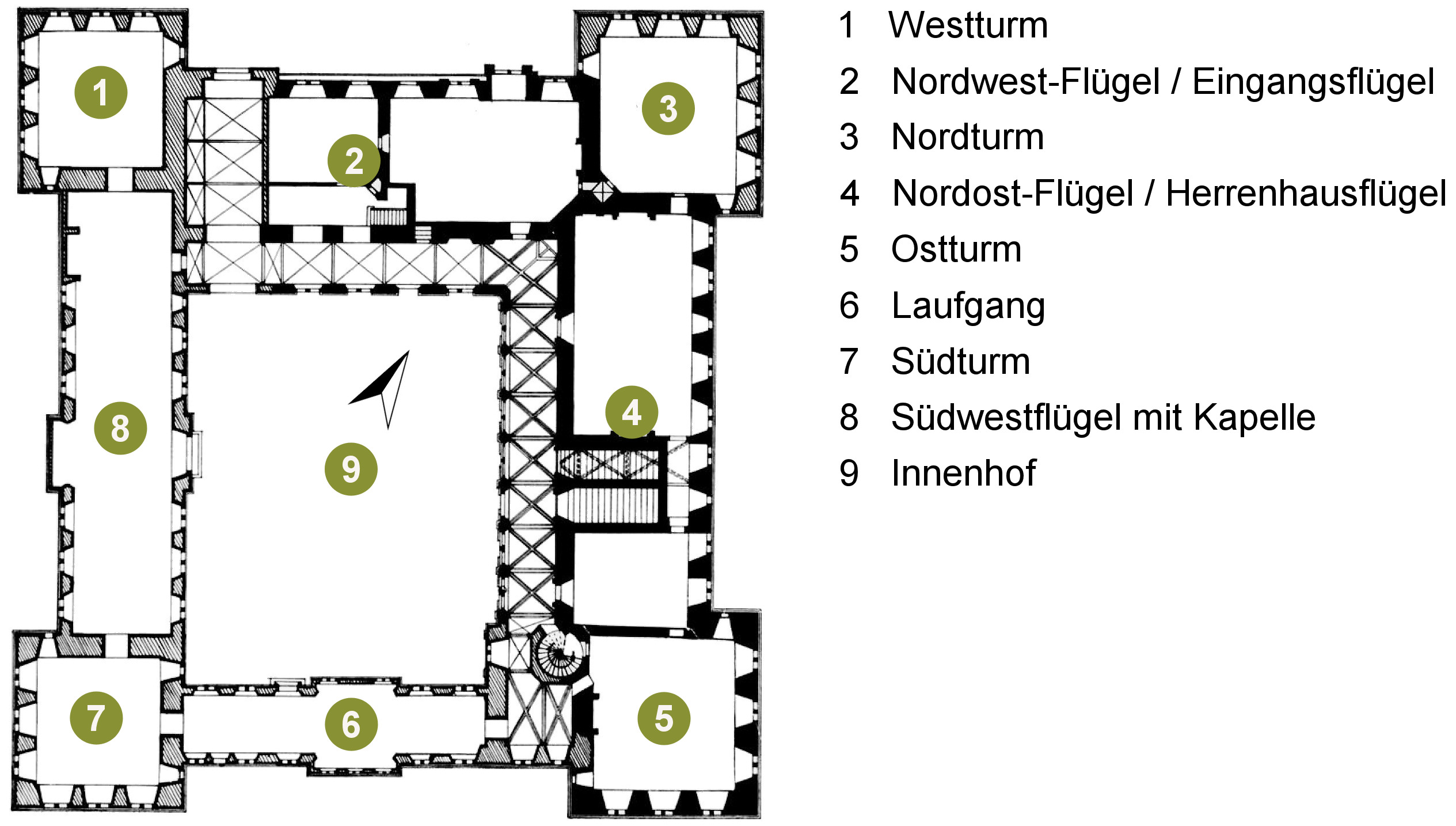
Floor plan of the castle as it was around 1850; Laid down masonry is hatched

Horst Castle was a four-winged complex with a side length of approximately 53 meters. At its four corners, there were square pavilion towers that slightly protruded from the alignment of the walls. The north-western entrance wing featured an elaborately designed portal and had three stories. The adjoining manor house wing, which was just as tall as the entrance wing, had only two stories. Although a third large castle wing was planned, it was never constructed, leaving the two remaining sides of the complex formed by low, single-story wings. The south-eastern wing was an open walkway to the courtyard with a slate-covered roof, and the chapel was in the southwestern wing. The building materials used were brick and sandstone from the Baumberge mountains. Red brick was used for the masonry, while light-coloured house stone was employed for door and window jambs, friezes, and cornices. After its construction, Horst Castle was completely white-plastered, in contrast to its present state. This white plastering contrasted with the largely gilded house stone elements and the cornices and jambs painted in black and green. Some of the pilasters and columns on the courtyard side of the façade were painted to simulate marble. The interior was equally colourful, featuring artistically painted ceilings and walls, contributing to the lavish interior decoration with battle and putti friezes, as well as elaborately designed portal walls and chimney pots.

The entire complex was surrounded by a wide but shallow moat, which was accompanied by a 3.5-meter-wide berm, at least on the eastern side. The moat system was fed by the Emscher, whose main course flowed around the site to the north and west until the 19th century. The main castle was situated on its island, which was preceded by an outer castle to the northeast. The main island and the outer island were connected by a three-arched stone bridge. Access to the castle complex from the outside could only be obtained through a drawbridge at the gatehouse of the outer castle.

=== Today's condition ===
==== Exterior ====
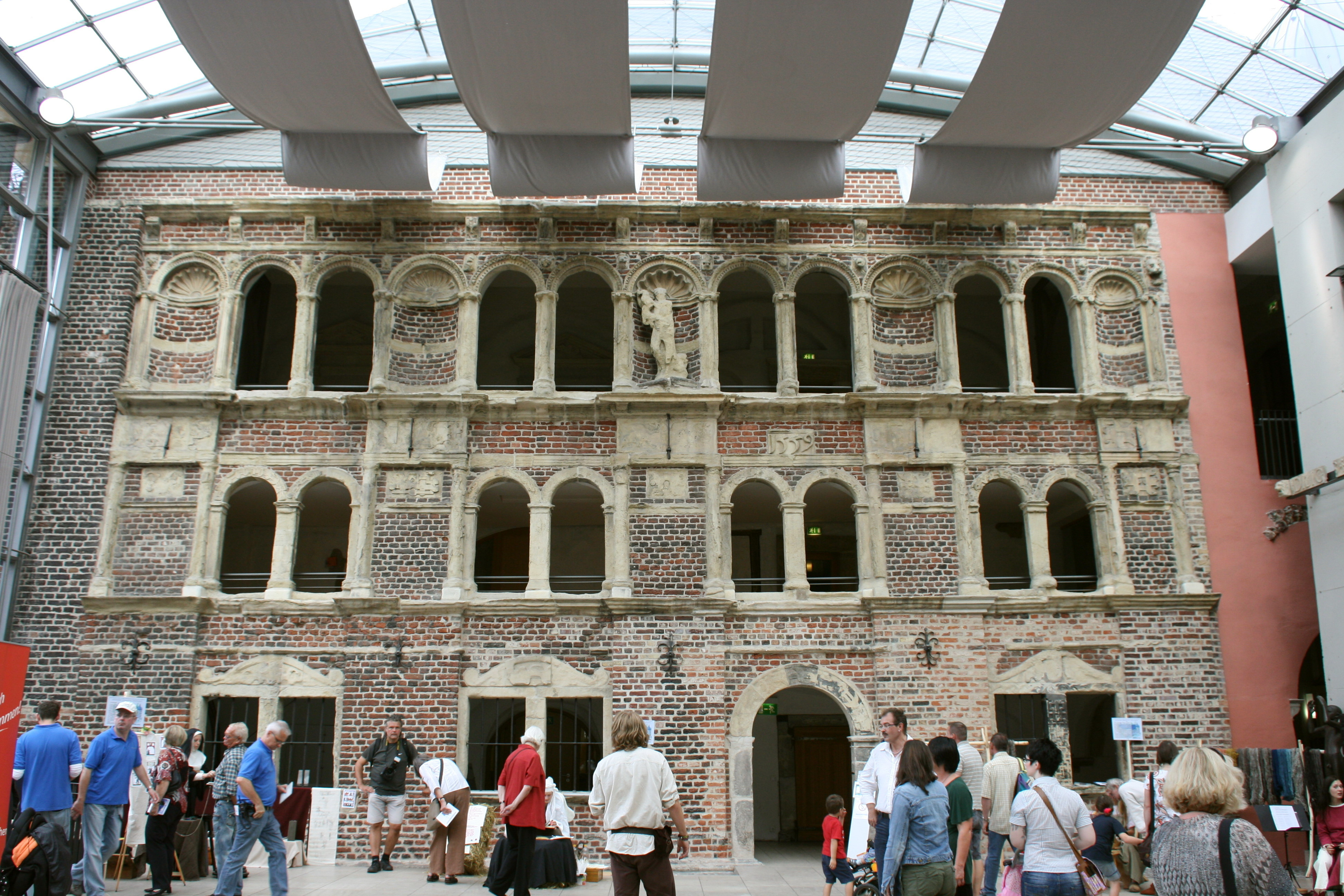
Courtyard facade of the entrance wing

In contrast to older publications, excavations in the 1990s showed that Horst Castle is not a pile foundation, but rests only on several layers of roughly hewn sandstone. This inadequate foundation is the main reason why only a few parts of the once-large complex remain in their original state today. These include the cellars with cross vaults of all four castle wings - with the exception of the cellar floors of the west and east towers - as well as the entrance wing in the north-west and the so-called Knights' Hall with Renaissance cross-storey windows in the rebuilt north-east wing. The north tower connecting the two wings was rebuilt in the 1990s with the dimensions of its predecessor and its simple sandstone cornice echoes the horizontal structure of the two adjoining wings. All the other corner towers of the castle complex were rebuilt up to the level of the courtyard to show visitors the layout and dimensions of the Renaissance complex. Today it is surrounded by a dry moat from the 20th century.

Horst Castle has high roofs. Measured from the outside, the building, including the basement, is around 24 metres high, twelve metres of which are accounted for by the roof construction. On the entrance façade is the bay window spanning several storeys. It rests on trestle brackets and has rich house stone decoration in the form of caryatids, cartouches and scrollwork. The façade is divided horizontally by two moulded stone cornices but does not reflect the number of storeys in the building. The wing had three storeys, with the manorial bedrooms located on the top floor and the lower mezzanine floor being reserved for the servants. The ground floor also served as the kitchen area. While the portal and windows on the plinth floor exterior were broken out during the building's conversion into a restaurant, they were not originally part of the structure. Adjacent to the entrance wing lies a free-standing archway built of rusticated ashlars, which represents the only surviving element of the former gatehouse. Traces of the previous architectural decorations can still be observed on the structure. Presently, a contemporary incline ascends towards the entrance, beneath which remains of the castle bridge pillars are visible. These remnants, along with some portions of the ancient fortification barrier of the outer courtyard, were discovered during 20th-century excavations.

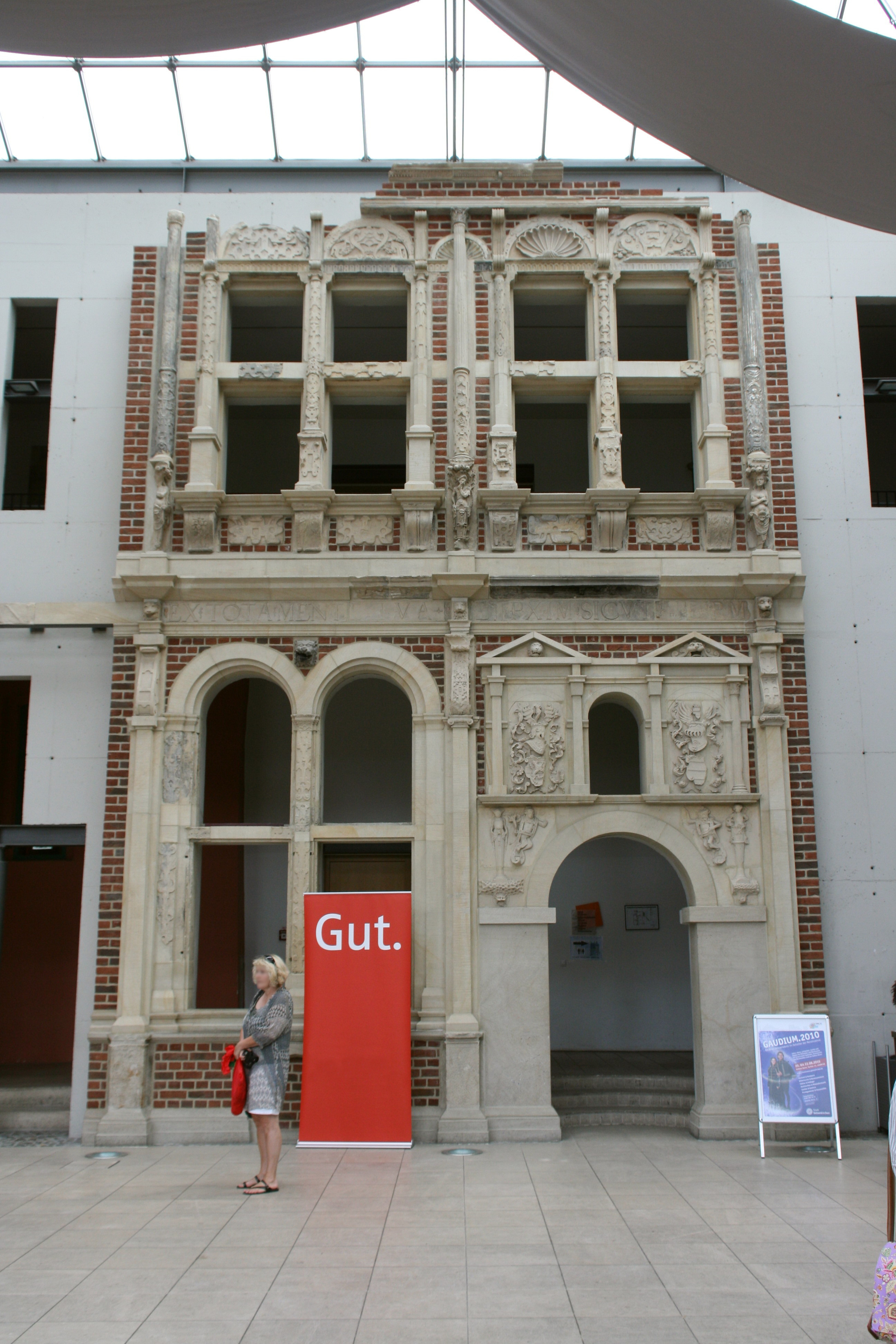
Partially reconstructed courtyard facade of the manor house wing

A large part of the former inner courtyard is now covered by a glass hall. Among other things, it serves to protect the courtyard façade of the northwest wing, which has been badly affected by emissions. Its moulded cornices divide the three storeys of the wing. On the ground floor, each pair of square windows is crowned by a common flat gable. In between, there are heavily cranked, unadorned pilasters. The building has domed arched windows on the first and first floors. Between those on the first floor are Tuscan columns, which are richly decorated with scrollwork and support a wide entablature. On the top floor, the round-arched windows are flanked by Ionic columns and alternate with statue niches, of which only five of the original seven niches remain due to the shortening of the wing in the 19th century. The sculptures in these niches depicted the seven planets. Today, only the heavily weathered, 1.5-metre statue of Saturn remains. A richly decorated console cornice forms the upper end of the façade.

The courtyard façade of the northeast wing was demolished in the middle of the 19th century. However, as many parts of the façade decoration were saved from final destruction, two sections of the courtyard façade could be reconstructed. The new parts were characterised by an exquisite simplicity compared to the opulent originals. The replica shows the round-arched main portal with the coats of arms of Rütger von der Horst and his wife Anna von Palandt above it. These are flanked by Corinthian columns supporting a flat triangular pediment with a lion's head in the gable field. The spandrels to the right and left of the portal feature herms and satyrs wrapped in scrollwork. The two storeys of the wing are clearly separated by a moulded cornice. A stone band with the inscription "EX TOTA MENTE TUA | ET PXIM SICVT [TE I]PM ..." runs directly below this cornice. It refers to an Old Testament quote with an addition from the New Testament, which can be translated in full as "You shall love the Lord your God with all your heart and with all your soul, and your neighbour as yourself". The façade axes are separated from each other on the ground floor by Ionic pilasters, while Corinthian columns based on sculptures fulfil this function on the upper floor.

=== Interior ===
Some remnants of the original decoration provide a glimpse of the castle's former opulence. Notable features include the 16th-century Resurrection Fireplace, found in the fireplace room on the ground floor of the entrance wing. It derives its name from a scenic depiction on its front lintel, illustrating Ezekiel's vision of the resurrection of the dead on the Last Day. Another significant piece is the Diana fireplace, located in the oriel room above. While it is a partial reconstruction from preserved original fragments, it is named after its front relief, which portrays Diana punishing the pregnant nymph, Callisto.

Several other examples of intricate and precious interior decoration have survived as originals. These include the rusticated portal in the fireplace room and the ornate jamb of a side entrance to the Knight's Hall. Notably, the Knight's Hall is the sole room in the former manor house wing that evaded demolition in the mid-19th century. This room can be dated back to 1566, as evidenced by the date on its main portal. Within the hall, there is a staircase leading to the floor below, which was once connected to the former palace kitchen and followed the architectural models of Italian palazzos.

The gallery corridors on the courtyard side of the entrance wing have cross-vaulted ceilings, which were innovative for their time. The ground-floor one has a groined vault, and the first-floor gallery has a ribbed vault. Ornamental and figurative paintings in shades of black, beige, and grey adorn the first-floor gallery and are from the time of construction. However, currently, only a section of the painting that has been restored is visible to visitors; the rest is waiting to be restored under plasterboard.

== Art-historical classification ==
Despite significant decay and demolition damage, Horst Castle remains one of the most significant in Westphalia. The Horst building combined French and Italian palazzo architecture. It featured a closed four-winged complex with projecting pavilion towers at the corners and closely resembled the floor plans of the castles of Ancy-le-Franc and Écouen. The building's interior design was extensively modelled after decoration common in Italian palazzi, such as the courtyard-side galleries and the central staircase integrated into the building. Horst was the first complex in Westphalia, Germany, in which a clear differentiation was made between public and private spaces. This was achieved through the use of galleries which provided access to individual rooms. The expansive staircase, with its innovative double-flight design, allowed for the elimination of a stair tower in front of the façade, a customary feature until then.

The sculptures present in the decoration were influenced by Dutch Mannerism and are now known as the "Stone Treasure". The use of such decoration in 16th-century castle construction was unprecedented and is considered a bridge between Dutch architecture and architecture in the Weser region. The art historian Richard Klapheck coined the term "Lippe Renaissance" to describe the features of Horst Castle, which not only inspired this movement but is also regarded as a crucial building.

=== The Stone Treasure ===
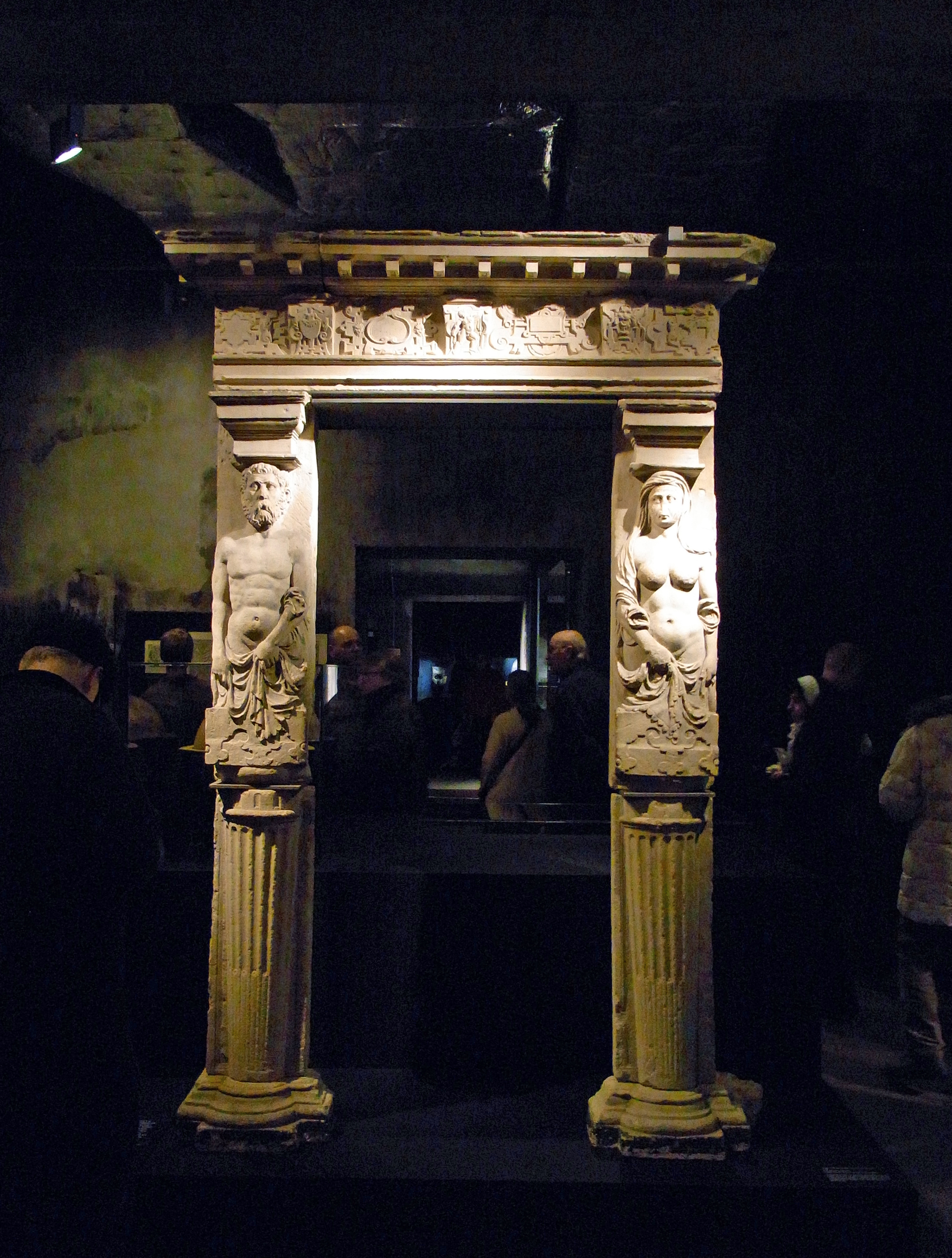
Door frames from Horst Castle, now in the Ruhr Museum

Over the years, the Fürstenberg family, who were the owners of the castle for an extended period, managed to preserve various elements of the façade decoration, including parts of portals and fireplaces.

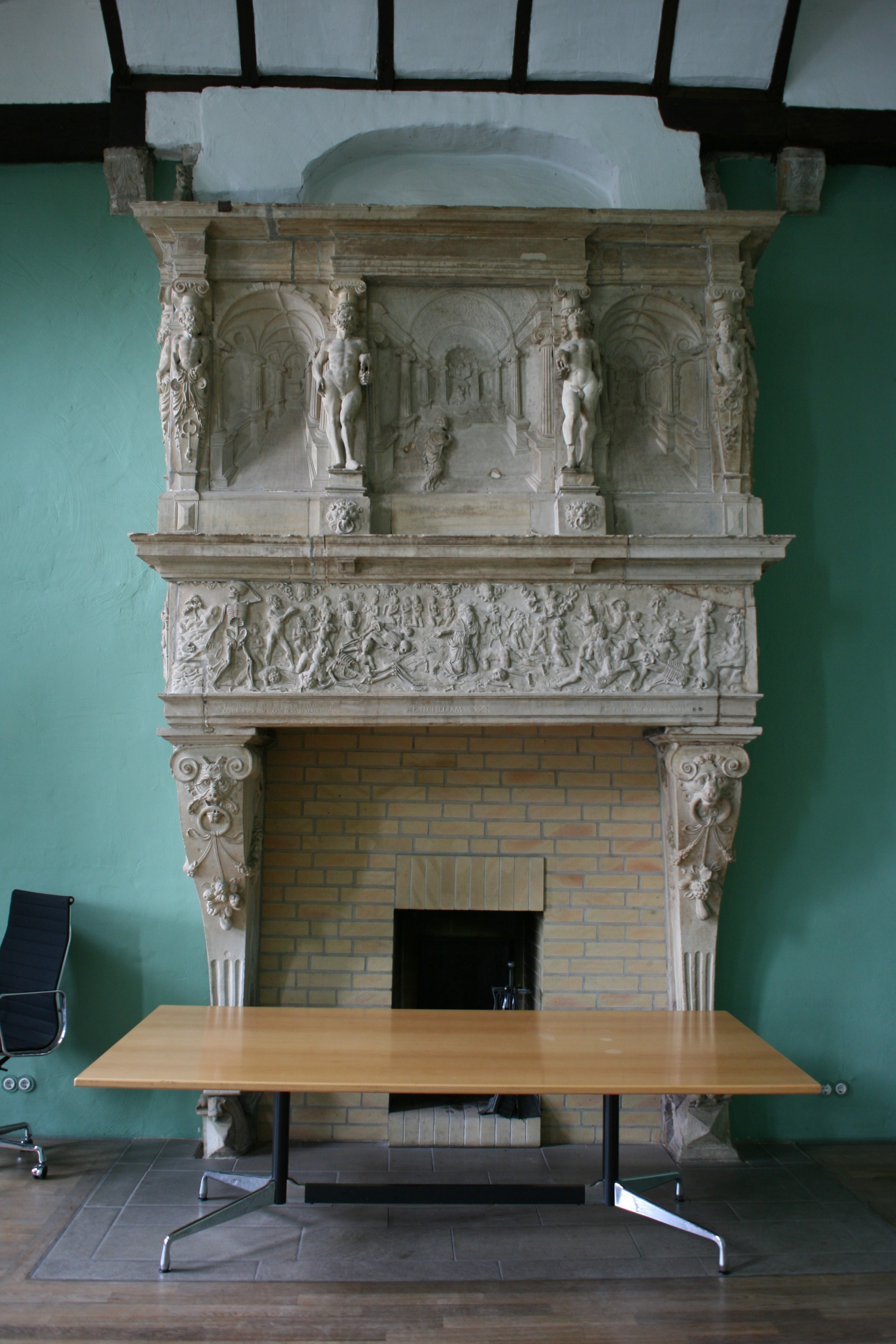
The Resurrection Chimney

=== Excavation finds ===
The excavations carried out on the palace grounds during the 1990s revealed a number of artifacts that revealed the artistic and historical significance of the palace. Among these discoveries were fragments of façade ornamentation and medallions featuring depictions of Roman Caesars. Notably, the excavators also unearthed pieces of what are referred to as tectonic tiles, which included high-quality moulding, cornice, wreath, and crowning tiles. The archaeological findings provided insights into the court life and table culture of the palace's former occupants. These included items such as silver and ivory cutlery, precious cut stone vessels, ceramics, and Venetian glasses.
