= Hieronymus van Busleyden =

Dutch patron of learning and humanist

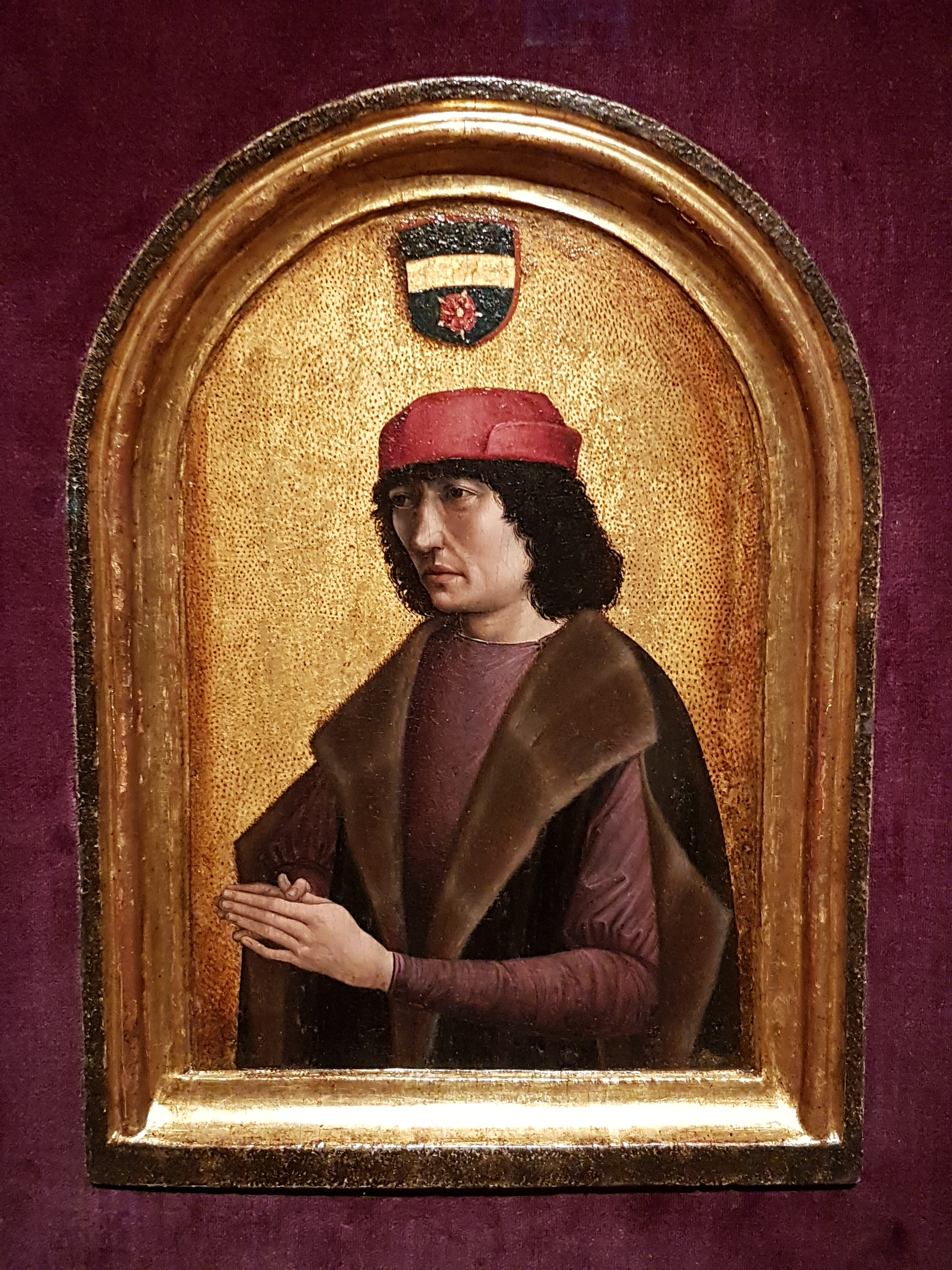
- Born: Hieronymus van Busleyden c. 1470; Arlon, Burgundian Netherlands
- Died: 27 August 1517; Bordeaux, France
- Other names: Jérôme de Busleyden

Hieronymus van Busleyden (Dutch: Jeroen van Busleyden; French: Jérôme de Busleyden) (c.1470 – 27 August 1517) was a patron of learning and a humanist from the Habsburg Netherlands. His name is usually partially Latinized in English, and can also appear as Hieronymus Busleyden or fully Latinized as Hieronymus Buslidius. (Note: His forename in Latin, Hieronymus, is also spelled as Hiëronymus, Hieronimus or Hiëronimus, and his forename in Dutch, Jeroen, has a variant as Jeroom. Capitalization of 'van' occurs, and/or a spelling as Busleiden and in German as Bauschleiden or in Luxembourgish Bauschelt (Jérôme vu Bauschelt), since an ancestor had come from that place known in English by the French name Boulaide; his birthplace Arlon is in (the today Belgian province of) Luxembourg. English commentators of Thomas More's Utopia also name 'Jerome Busleyden' and 'Jerome de Busleyden'.)

== Life ==
Busleyden was born in Arlon as a son of Jeanne Elisabeth de Mussey, (Note: Sources name Jeanne Elisabeth, or one of these forenames, or Isabelle, and also de Mussey or de Musset.) of Marville, and Gilles, of an old Luxembourgish family from Bauschleyden, who lived in Arlon (about 30 km south of Bauschleyden) and could afford a more than decent education for their sons. (Note: Other sons, next to the two mentioned in the text: Gilles (Jr.), the eldest, and Valerius, the youngest. Not indicating a lesser education for their three daughters, Catherine, Margaret(he) and Jacoba.) One of Hieronymus's older brothers, François (Note: Frans van Busleyden aka François de Busleyden aka Franz von Busleyden (article on the French-language Wikipedia)) (1455–1502), filled several political and ecclesiastical functions, including Archbishop of (the Imperial City of) Besançon, under Philip the Handsome, in the transition period from Burgundian to Habsburg Netherlands.

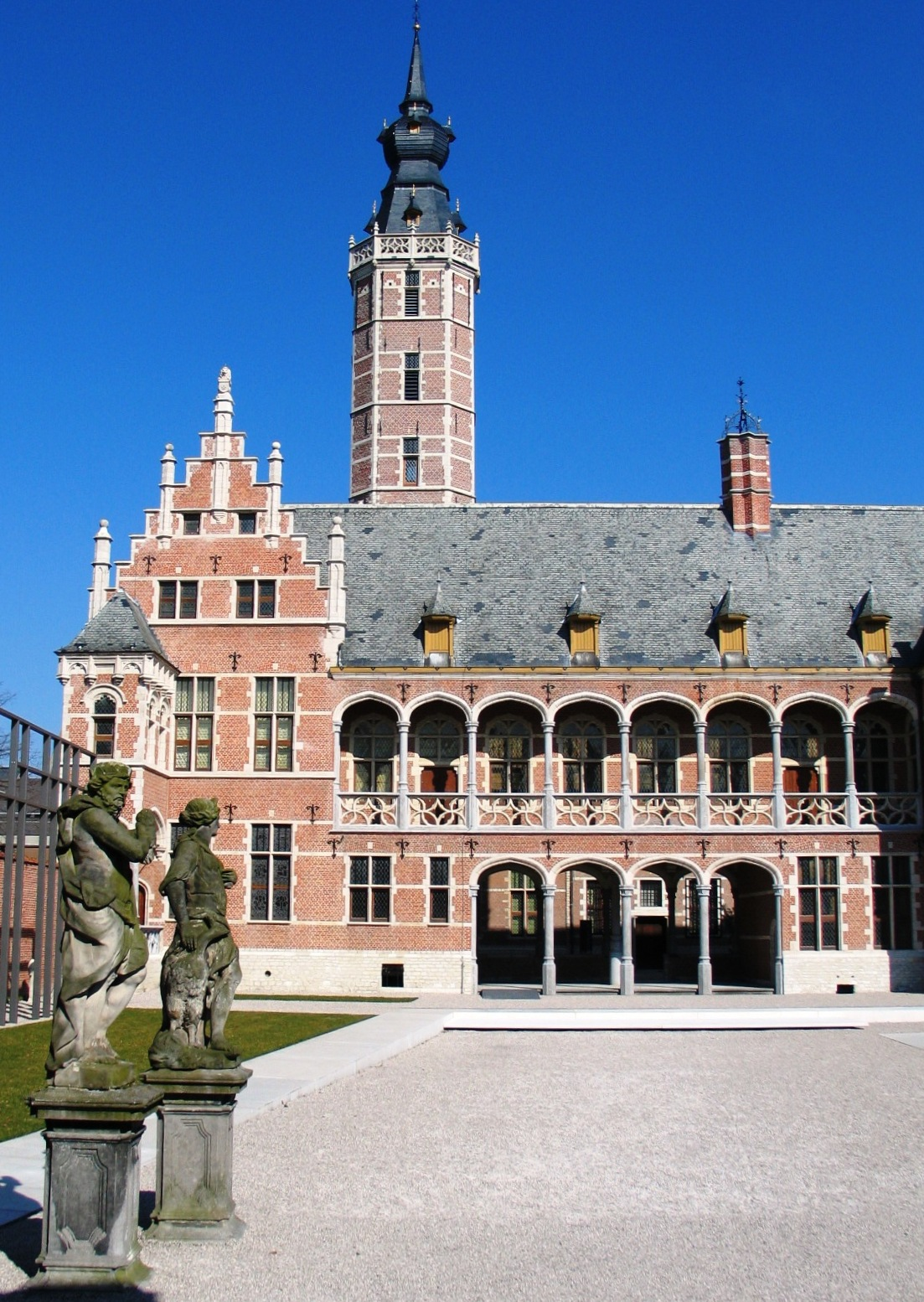
Hof van Busleyden, city palace in Mechelen (2006)

From around 1485, Hieronymus studied in Leuven (under the early humanist Leo Outers), then in Orléans, and finally in Padua where he met Cuthbert Tunstall, who would later write to Henry VIII about his friend. In 1503 or 1504, Busleyden became a councillor and master of requests at the Great Council of the Netherlands at Mechelen. In his diplomatic function, he visited Pope Julius II in Rome and in 1508 welcomed the Holy Roman Emperor, Maxilimilian of Austria, at Mechelen.

During Archduchess Margaret of Austria's regency (Note: Margaret was the regent of the Low Countries as guardian of Philip's son Charles, who was being raised at her palace. After a few years of the latter's reign as the first king of Spain (during which Hieronymus Van Busleyden died), he – just having been elected Charles V, Holy Roman Emperor – appointed her as governess of the still undivided Netherlands.) he led a life of patron and humanist in Mechelen at the Hof van Busleyden, which city palace he had built in a very early Renaissance style (Note: The palace of Margaret of Austria (now housing the lower Court of Justice, as its Appeal Court is in Antwerp, the provincial capital) is often referred to as one of the earliest Renaissance buildings north of the Alps; only 350 metres apart, Busleyden had his residence built in about the same years; it is now a City museum and the tower holds a 49 bells carillion. A source states that Hieronymus inherited the building from his brother Frans in 1502 but as the construction started between 1505 and 1507, only the grounds might have been inherited with the considerable fortune that indeed allowed building the house.) At the time tutoring Margaret's nephew Charles, Adriaan Boeyens visited the house, well before he became pope. Busleyden was a friend of Ferry Carondelet and friend and correspondent of Thomas More and Erasmus. While More and Tunstall were in the Low Countries in 1515 and again – meeting Erasmus – in 1516, they are all likely to have stayed at their friend's residence. More started to write his Utopia there and would later describe Busleyden's house (in Ad Buslidianum de aedibus magnificis Mechliniae) and his collection of ancient coins (in Nummis antiquis apud Hieronymum Buslidianum servatis).

Hieronymus van Busleyden held positions in the Catholic Church: archdeacon of Our Lady's in Cambrai (1503), provost of St. Peter's in Aire-sur-la-Lys and canon of St. Rumbold's in Mechelen, St. Lambert's in Liège, St. Waltrude's in Mons, and St. Gudula in Brussels. In 1515 Margaret's nephew Charles, making his formal entrance as Archduke into the city where he lived, was greeted by Busleyden representing the clergy, in the welcoming speech putting emphasis on the desirability (for the Netherlands) of a peaceful course of action (by the still youthful Charles).

== Death ==
Appointed Chancellor by Charles, while travelling to Spain in preparation of Charles' ascendence to the throne, he fell ill and died in Bordeaux. His body was brought to Mechelen and buried in St. Rumbold's Cathedral.

By execution of his last will, written two days before his last voyage, the wealthy Busleyden was the founder of the Collegium Buslidianum, better known as the Collegium Trilingue and at the time not yet formally a part of the University of Leuven.

== Sources ==
- Bietenholz, Peter G.; Deutscher, Thomas Brian (January 2003). Contemporaries of Erasmus - A Biographical Register of the Renaissance and Reformation - Volumes 1-3. University of Toronto Press (published 1985). ISBN 9780802085771.
- Cayley, Arthur (1808). Memoirs of Sir Thomas More, with a new translation of his Utopia, his History of King Richard III, and his Latin poems, Volume 1 (Google eBoek). London: Cadell and Davis.
- Cayley, Arthur (1808). Memoirs of Sir Thomas More, with a new translation of his Utopia, his History of King Richard III, and his Latin poems, Volume 2 (Google eBoek). London: Cadell and Davis.
- David Weil Baker. (September 2003), "49. Ruin and Utopia." (PDF), Moreana Vol. 40, 155, The Center for Thomas More Studies - Department of English, Rutgers University, Newark. Newark, NJ 07 1 02. USA, archived from the original (PDF) on 20 March 2012
- Schötter (1876). "Buslidius, Franz" (in German). NDB ADB Allgemeine Deutsche Biographie. p. 648.
- Schötter (1876). "Buslidius, Hieronymus" (in German). NDB ADB Allgemeine Deutsche Biographie. p. 648.
- Duverger, Jozef; et al. (1964). Busleyden, Buslidius, Jeroom van (1470-1517), humanist, staatsman (in Dutch). Brussel, Paleis der Academiën. pp. 283–287.
- Cosaert, Koen. "Mechelen - Stedelijk museum "Hof van Busleyden"" (in Dutch). Vlaamse Beiaardvereniging.
