= Boulaide =

Boulaide Bauschelt
- Commune
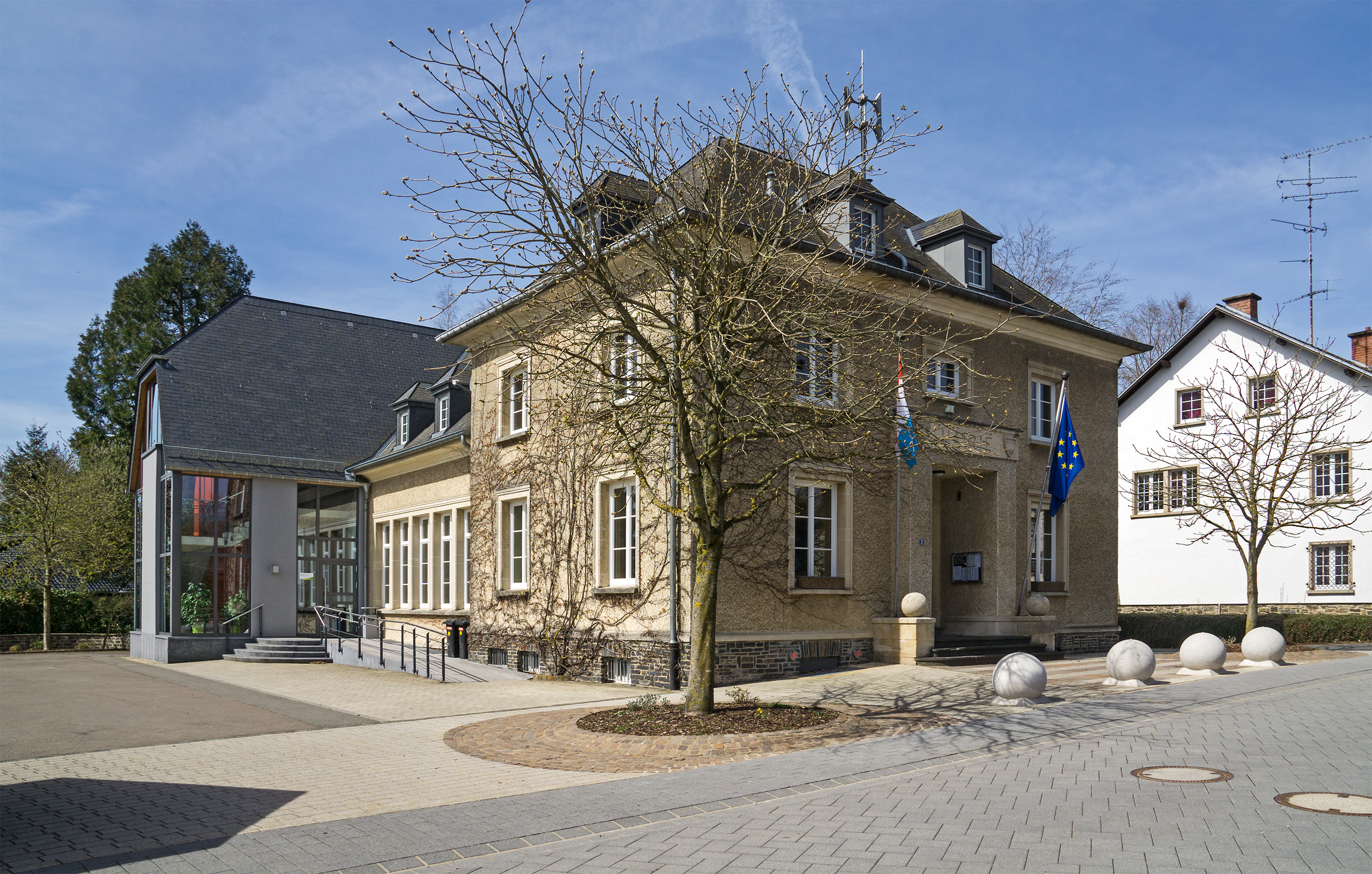
- Town hall

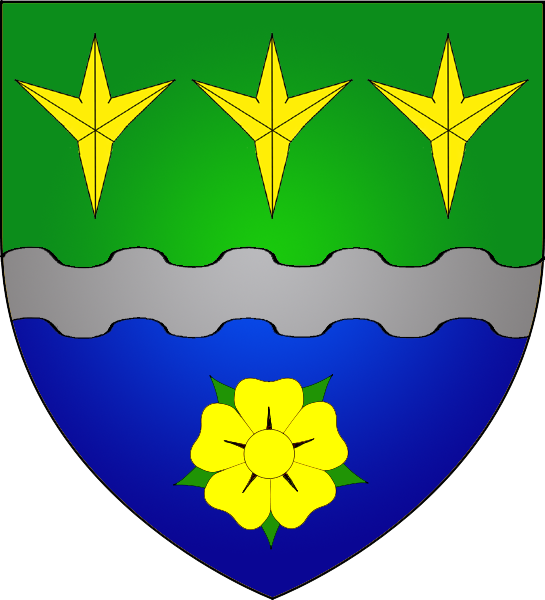
- Coat of arms

- Map of Luxembourg with Boulaide highlighted in orange, and the canton in dark red
- Coordinates: 49.8867°N 5.8144°E
- Country: Luxembourg
- Canton: Wiltz

Government
  - Mayor: Jeff Gangler (Independent)

Area
  - Total: 32.13 km^{2} (12.41 sq mi)
  - Rank: 22nd of 100
- Highest elevation: 487 m (1,598 ft)
  - Rank: 23rd of 100
- Lowest elevation: 319 m (1,047 ft)
  - Rank: 98th of 100

Population (2025)
  - Total: 1,572
  - Rank: 91st of 100
  - Density: 48.93/km^{2} (126.7/sq mi)
  - Rank: 95th of 100
- Time zone: UTC+1 (CET)
  - Summer (DST): UTC+2 (CEST)
- LAU 2: LU0000801
- Website: boulaide.lu

Boulaide (French pronunciation: [bulɛd]; Luxembourgish: Bauschelt [ˈbæːʊ̯ʃəlt]; German: Bauschleiden [ˈbaʊʃlaɪdn̩]) is a commune and small town in north-western Luxembourg. It is part of the canton of Wiltz, which is part of the district of Diekirch. As of 2023, it has a total population of 1,499.

The commune is composed of three villages: Boulaide, which as of 2026 has a population of 797, Baschleiden, and Surré.

In 1976 the township erected a monument in honor of the 35th Infantry Division, who liberated the town during World War II.

Boulaide is also a part of the European Road of Freedom. This project was initiated by the Jewish Painter and Sculptor Otto Freundlich, who was killed in a German concentration camp during World War II. Together with his friend Jeanne Kosnick-Kloss he had planned to create two sculpture roads. The first one was supposed to go from North to South and they had called it "The road of human fraternity". The second one was supposed to go from West to East and its name was "the road of human solidarity and the memory of the liberation". At the intersection of the two roads in Auvers-sur-Oise in France they had planned to erect a high tower called "the Lighttower of peace by means of the seven arts". But Otto Freundlich could not carry out his plans and so some 35 years ago, the German artist Leo Kornbrust took over the project and now the plans are to create a road of sculptures from the landing coast in France to Moscow in Russia. In Boulaide this Road of Freedom is present through a group of wooden sculptures, created by the Luxembourgish artist Marie Josée Kerschen.

In mid-2025, formal talks were launched between Boulaide and neighbouring Lac de la Haute-Sûre for a future merger of the two communes, with a referendum on the matter planned to be held before the 2029 communal elections. If successful, the merger would created the third largest commune in Luxembourg, after Wincrange and Clervaux.

== Population ==
Historical population

Year	Pop.	±%
1821	758	—
1851	1,420	+87.3%
1900	1,115	−21.5%
1910	1,112	−0.3%
1922	1,112	+0.0%
1935	982	−11.7%

Year	Pop.	±%
1947	938	−4.5%
1960	727	−22.5%
1970	639	−12.1%
1981	533	−16.6%
1990	562	+5.4%
2000	708	+26.0%

Year	Pop.	±%
2005	828	+16.9%
2010	927	+12.0%
2015	1,091	+17.7%
2020	1,344	+23.2%
2021	1,391	+3.5%

Source data
