= Carondelet =

Carondelet can refer to:

== People ==
- Francisco Luis Héctor de Carondelet (1748–1807), governor in the Spanish Empire
- Ferry Carondelet (1473–1528), Habsburg diplomat and abbot
- Jan I Carondelet (1428–1502), Burgundian jurist and politician
- Jean Carondelet (1469–1544), archbishop of Palermo

== Places ==
- Carondelet, St. Louis, Missouri
- Carondelet Park in St. Louis
- Carondelet Canal and Carondelet Street in New Orleans, Louisiana
- Carondelet Reef in the Phoenix Islands in the Pacific Ocean
- Carondelet High School, an all-girls Catholic school in Concord, California
- Palacio de Carondelet (the presidential palace) in the main square (Plaza de la Independencia) in Quito, Ecuador

== Ships ==
- Two ships of the United States Navy have borne the name USS Carondelet:
  - USS Carondelet, a gunboat on the Mississippi River during the U.S. Civil War
  - USS Carondelet (IX-136), a tanker in the Pacific Ocean during World War II
- SS Carondelet, a ship active in transporting immigrants between Havana and New York City during 1877 and 1878
- CSS Carondelet, a gunboat on Lake Pontchartrain during the American Civil War
