= Jan van der Burch =

Jan van der Burch (died 1595) was an office-holder in the Habsburg Netherlands.

== Life ==
Van der Burch was the son of Adrien van der Burch, president of the Council of Flanders. He himself became a member of the Council of Flanders, and on 10 November 1569 was appointed master of requests to the Great Council of Mechelen. The Duke of Alva also appointed him a commissioner of the Council of Troubles, responsible for identifying fugitives who had participated in the early stages of the Dutch Revolt and sequestering their property. When the city of Mechelen fell to the rebels in 1572, van der Burch was imprisoned, his house plundered and his servants killed. He was released and restored to his position when Alva retook the city.

During the English Fury at Mechelen, in 1580, he was able to escape the city. On 12 December 1584 he was appointed president of the Great Council, then Councillor of State, and finally, on 16 June 1592, president of the Privy Council of the Habsburg Netherlands. He died in Brussels on 5 July 1595.

Government offices
Preceded by Jean de Glymes	President of the Great Council; 1584–1595	Succeeded by Igram van Achelen
Preceded by Willem van Pamele	President of the Privy Council; 1592–1595	Succeeded by Jean Richardot
