= Jean de Glymes =

Jean de Glymes was the name of several members of the nobility in the Habsburg Netherlands.

- John III of Glymes (1452–1532), Lord of Bergen op Zoom
- John IV of Glymes (1528–1567), Marquis of Bergen
- Jean de Glymes, Lord of Waterdijk (died 1583)
