= History of international law =

The history of international law examines the evolution and development of public international law in both state practice and conceptual understanding. Modern international law developed in Renaissance Europe and is strongly entwined with the development of Western political organisation at that time. The development of European notions of sovereignty and nation-states necessitated methods for interstate relations and standards of behaviour, which laid the foundations of what would become international law. However, while the origins of the modern system of international law can be traced back 400 years, the concepts and practises that underpin it can be traced to ancient political relationships. Important concepts derive from the practice among Greek city-states and the Roman law concept of ius gentium (which regulated contacts between Roman citizens and non-Roman people). These principles were not universal, however. In East Asia, political theory was based not on the equality of states, but rather on the cosmological supremacy of the Emperor of China.

== Early history ==
Basic concepts of international law, such as treaties, date back thousands of years; early examples include an agreement between the rulers of the city-states of Lagash and Umma in Mesopotamia, inscribed on a stone block and setting a prescribed boundary between the two states around 2100 BC. Around 1000 BC, an agreement was signed between Ramses II of Egypt and the king of the Hittites establishing "eternal peace and brotherhood" between their two nations: dealing with respect for each other's territory and establishing a form of defensive alliance. The ancient Greeks before Alexander the Great formed many small states that constantly interacted. In peace and in war, an inter-state culture evolved that prescribed certain rules for how these states would interact. These rules did not apply to interactions with non-Greek states, but among themselves the Greek inter-state community resembled in some respects the modern international community.

The Roman Empire did not develop an international law, as it acted without regard to any external rules in its dealings with those territories that were not already part of the empire. The Romans did, however, form municipal laws governing the interactions between private Roman citizens and foreigners. These laws, called the jus gentium (as opposed to the jus civile governing interactions between citizens) codified some ideas of basic fairness, and attributed some rules to an objective, independent "natural law." These jus gentium ideas of fairness and natural law have survived and are reflected in modern international law.

Early Islamic law's principles concerning military conduct and the treatment of prisoners of war under the early Caliphate are considered precursors to international humanitarian law. The many requirements on how prisoners of war should be treated included, for example, providing shelter, food and clothing, respecting their cultures, and preventing any acts of execution, rape or revenge. Some of these principles were not codified in Western international law until modern times. Islamic law under the early Caliphate institutionalised humanitarian limitations on military conduct, including attempts to limit the severity of war, guidelines for ceasing hostilities, distinguishing between civilians and combatants, preventing unnecessary destruction, and caring for the sick and wounded.

== Nation-states ==
After the fall of the Roman Empire and the collapse of the Holy Roman Empire into independent cities, principalities, kingdoms and nations, for the first time there was a real need for rules of conduct between a large international community. Without an empire or a dominant religious leadership to moderate and direct international dealings, most of Europe looked to Justinian's code of law from the Roman Empire, and the canon law of the Catholic Church for inspiration.

International trade was the real catalyst for the development of objective rules of behaviour between states. Without a code of conduct, there was little to guarantee trade or protect the merchants of one state from the actions of another. Economic self-interest drove the evolution of common international trade rules, and most importantly the rules and customs of maritime law.

As international trade, exploration and warfare became more involved and complex, the need for common international customs and practices became even more important. The Hanseatic League of the more than 150 entities in what is now Germany, Scandinavia, and the Baltic states developed many useful international customs, which facilitated trade and communication among other things. The Italian city-states developed diplomatic rules, as they began sending ambassadors to foreign capitals. Treaties—agreements between governments intended to be binding—became a useful tool to protect commerce. The horrors of the Thirty Years' War, meanwhile, created an outcry for rules of combat that would protect civilian communities.

== Hugo Grotius ==
International practices, customs, rules and treaties proliferated to the point of complexity. Several scholars sought to compile them all into organized treatises. The most important of these was Hugo Grotius, whose treatise De Jure Belli Ac Pacis Libri Tres is considered the starting point for modern international law. Before Hugo Grotius, most European thinkers treated law as something independent of mankind, with its own existence. Some laws were invented by men, but ultimately they reflected the essential natural law. Grotius was no different, except in one important respect: Unlike the earlier thinkers, who believed that the natural law was imposed by a deity, Grotius believed that the natural law came from an essential universal reason, common to all men.

This rationalist perspective enabled Grotius to posit several rational principles underlying law. Law was not imposed from above, but rather derived from principles. Foundation principles included the axioms that promises must be kept, and that harming another requires restitution. These two principles have served as the basis for much of subsequent international law. Apart from natural-law principles, Grotius also dealt with international custom, or voluntary law. Grotius emphasized the importance of actual practices, customs and treaties—what "is" done—as opposed to normative rules of what "ought to be" done. This positivist approach to international law strengthened over time. As nations became the predominant form of state in Europe, and their man-made laws became more important than religious doctrines and philosophies, the law of what "is" similarly became more important than the law of what "ought to be."

According to the Jewish jurist and diplomat Shabtai Rosenne, the 17-century major figures of the law of nations were used to extensively refer to Jewish sources like the Codes of Law, Maimonides, Moses of Coucy, Ibn Ezra, Leon of Modena and Menasseh Ben Israel. The jurists referring to them were Grotius, Selden, Ayala, Gentili, Zouch, Samuel Rachel and Pufendorf.

== Peace of Westphalia ==
The Westphalian treaties of 1648 were a turning point in establishing the principle of state sovereignty as a cornerstone of the international order. However the first attempts at formulating autonomous theories of international law occurred before this, in Spain, in the 16th century. Most prominent among the early theorizers were the Roman Catholic theologians Francisco de Vitoria and Francisco Suárez. Suárez is especially notable in this regard in that he distinguished between ius inter gentes and ius intra gentes which he derived from ius gentium (the rights of peoples). Ius inter gentes corresponds to modern international law. In 1625, Hugo Grotius followed with the first systematic treatise on international law, de iure belli ac pacis, which dealt with the laws of war and peace. One important aspect of Grotius's treatment of international law is that he no longer bases it exclusively upon natural law, but also accepts that states among themselves can also create binding rules of law (ius voluntarium).

Still, in the 17th and 18th centuries, the idea of natural law as a basis for international law remained influential, and were further expressed in the works of Samuel von Pufendorf and Christian Wolff. Yet, in the second half of the 18th century, a shift occurs towards positivism in international law. In addition, the idea of international law as a means for maintaining international peace is challenged due to the increasing tensions between the European great powers (France, Prussia, Great-Britain, Russia and Austria). This tension between legal norms and political imperatives is well reflected in the century's most important treatise on international law, Emer de Vattel's Du Droit des Gens (1758). At the end of the century, Immanuel Kant believed that international law as a law that can justify war does not serve the purpose of peace anymore, and therefore argues in Perpetual Peace (Zum Ewigen Frieden, 1795) and the Metaphysics of Morals (Metaphysik der Sitten, 1797) for creating a new kind of international law.

After World War I, an attempt was made to establish such a new international law of peace, of which the League of Nations was considered to be one of the cornerstones, but this attempt failed. The Charter of the United Nations (1945) in fact reflects the fact that the traditional notion of state sovereignty remains the key concept in the law of nations. However, as recent research has shown, ius contra bellum (the outlawry of war) has its roots in 19th century legal and political discourse.

In the historiography of international law, some German authors, most notably among them Wilhelm Grewe and Karl-Heinz Ziegler, have argued that several periods can be distinguished, such as the Spanish era (1494–1648), the French era (1648-1789/1815), the English era (1789/1815-1919) and the American era since 1919. The transitions between these eras are often marked by grand peace settlements, such as the earlier mentioned treaties of Westphalia (1645–48), the treaties of Ryswick and Utrecht (1697/1714), Vienna (1814–15), Paris (1919) and San Francisco (the UN Charter, 1945).

== The League of Nations ==
Following World War I, as after the Thirty Years' War, there was an outcry for rules of warfare to protect civilian populations, as well as a desire to curb invasions. The League of Nations, established after the war, attempted to curb invasions by enacting a treaty agreement providing for economic and military sanctions against member states that used "external aggression" to invade or conquer other member states. An international court was established, the Permanent Court of International Justice, to arbitrate disputes between nations without resorting to war. Meanwhile, many nations signed treaties agreeing to use international arbitration rather than warfare to settle differences. International crises, however, demonstrated that nations were not yet committed to the idea of giving external authorities a say in how nations conducted their affairs. Aggression on the part of Germany, Italy and Japan went unchecked by international law, and it took a Second World War to end it.

== The postwar era ==
After World War II, as after the First World War and the Thirty Years' War, there was a strong desire to never again endure the horrors of war endured by the civilian populations. The League of Nations was re-attempted through another treaty organization, the United Nations.

The postwar era has significantly impacted international law. International cooperation has become far more commonplace, though of course not universal. Importantly, nearly two hundred nations are current members of the United Nations, and have voluntarily bound themselves to its charter. First world nations have recognized the need for international cooperation and support, and have routinely sought international agreement and consent before engaging in acts of war.

International law is, of course, only partly about the conduct of war. Most rules are civil, concerning the delivery of mail, trade, shipping, air travel, and the like. Most rules are obeyed routinely by most countries, because the rules make life easier for all concerned. The rules are rarely disputed. But some international law is extremely political and hotly debated. This includes not just the laws of warfare but also such matters as fishing rights.

== Modern customary international law ==
An important development in modern international law is the concept of "consent." Before World War II, a nation would not have been considered to be bound by a rule unless it had formally agreed to be bound by it, or it was already customarily abiding by that rule. Now, however, merely consenting to an international practice is sufficient to be bound by it, without signing a treaty.

An evolution of the positivist approach of Grotius, the concept of consent is an element of customary international law. Customary international law is essentially what states actually do (state practice), plus the opinio juris of what states believe international law requires them to do.

Customary international law applies to every country, regardless of whether they have formally agreed to it. At the same time, all countries take part in forming customary international law by their practices and decisions. As new rules arise, countries accept, reject or modify them. When most countries are following a rule, everyone else will be held to it. Therefore, doing nothing is the same as consenting. Nations that did not take action may find themselves bound by an international law that is not to their advantage.

Customary international law can be overruled, however, by a treaty. For this reason, much customary international law has been agreed to formally by treaties between nations.

== Modern treaty law ==
Treaties are essentially contracts between countries. They are agreements by which the parties intend to be bound. If treaties are broken, their effectiveness is weakened because there is no guarantee that future promises will be kept. So there is a strong incentive for nations to take treaties very seriously.

Modern nations engage in a two-step procedure for entering into treaties. The first step is signing the treaty. Being a signatory to a treaty means that a country intends to enter into the agreement. The second step is ratifying the treaty. A country that has ratified a treaty has gone beyond merely intending to enter into the agreement, and is now bound by it. This is a critical distinction, and sometimes a point of confusion. A nation may be a signatory to a treaty for many years without ever having ratified it.

Each country ratifies treaties its own way. The United States requires the two-thirds support of the Senate, the upper body of its legislature, for a treaty to be ratified; both the executive and the legislature must agree. In Canada, on the other hand, ratification is strictly an executive action, and no parliamentary approval is required before the nation is bound.

Modern treaties are interpreted according to the 1969 Vienna Convention on the Law of Treaties. This convention is so widely accepted that even nations that are not parties to the convention follow it. The convention's most important and sensible rule is that a treaty should be interpreted according to the plain meaning of its language, in the context of its purpose, and in good faith. This prevents much squabbling and unnecessary nit-picking. It also makes treaty authors spell out what they are trying to accomplish, to make interpretation easier, in a non-binding "preamble."

In the modern world, international law is contested either for its inability to enforce its rulings or for their capability to imperil national interest.

== See also ==
- Arbitration § History
- Jus gentium
- Jus naturale
- Third World Approaches to International Law (TWAIL), providing an alternative account to the Eurocentric narrative above.
- Consulate of the Sea international law, (13th century), written in Catalonia
- Cities of Refuge, a set of independent city-states in the Kingdom of Israel and the Kingdom of Judah

== Important experts ==
14th century

- Bartolus of Saxoferrato
- Baldus de Ubaldis
- Johannes Andreae
- Giovanni da Legnano

16th century

- Balthazar Ayala
- Francisco de Vitoria
- Jean Bodin
- Pierino Belli
- Sylvester Mazzolini

17th century

- Francisco Suarez
- Hugo Grotius
- Alberico Gentili
- Richard Zouche
- Samuel Pufendorf
- Gottfried Wilhelm Leibniz

18th century

- Jean Dumont
- Abbé de Saint-Pierre
- Cornelis van Bynkershoek
- Christian Wolff
- Emerich de Vattel
- Johann Jakob Moser
- Georg Friedrich von Martens

19th century

- Jeremy Bentham
- Johann Bluntschli
- Henry Wheaton
- Robert Phillimore
- Henry Sumner Maine

20th century

- William Howard Taft
- L. F. L. Oppenheim
- Hans Kelsen
- Carl Schmitt
- Georges Scelle
- Hersch Lauterpacht
- Martti Koskenniemi

Universities and institutes

- Frankfurt am Main (Max-Planck Institute for the History of European Law)
- Graduate Institute of International Studies, Geneva (P. Haggenmacher)
- Tilburg University (R. Lesaffer, Research Group on the History of International Law)
- University of Paris (Panthéon-Sorbonne)
- Cambridge University (Law faculty)
- New York University School of Law (Program for History and Theory of International Law)
- The Fletcher School of Law and Diplomacy
- University of British Columbia (Law faculty)
- Harvard University (European Law Research Center)
- Institute of State and Law (Institute of State and Law, Russian Academy of Sciences)
- Leiden University (A. Wijffels)
- University of Utrecht (C.G. Roelofsen)
- Erasmus University Rotterdam (L. Winkel)
- University of Helsinki (Law faculty, Erik Castrén Institute of International Law and Human Rights)
- University of St Andrews (School of International Relations)
- University of Turin, Faculty of Law
- University of New South Wales (Law faculty)
- London School of Economics (Law faculty)
- T.M.C. Asser Instituut, Centre for International and European Law

== Bibliography ==
- B. Fassbender and A. Peters (eds.), S. Peter and D. Högger (assistant eds.), The Oxford Handbook of the History of International Law
- W.G. Grewe, Epochen der Völkerrechtsgeschichte, translated as The Epochs of International Law
- M. Koskenniemi, The Gentle Civilizer of Nations
- A. Nussbaum, A Concise History of the Law of Nations
- V. Genin, La laboratoire belge du droit international. Une communauté épistémique et internationale de juristes (1869-1914), Brussels, 2018; Incarner le droit international. Du mythe juridique au déclassement international de la Belgique (1914-1940), Brussels, 2018.
- H. Legohérel, Histoire du Droit International Public
- A. Truyol y Serra, Histoire du Droit International Public
- S. Laghmani, Histoire du droit des gens
- D. Gaurier, Histoire du droit international
- C. Focarelli, Lezioni di Storia del Diritto Internazionale
- A. Eyffinger (ed.), Compendium volkenrechtsgeschiedenis
- Journal of the History of International Law, since 1999
- Book series: Studien zur Geschichte des Völkerrechts (Max Planck Institut für europäische Rechtsgeschichte, Nomos Verslag)
- Book series: Studies in the History of International Law (Martinus Nijhoff)
