= Jan I Carondelet =

Burgundian jurist and politician

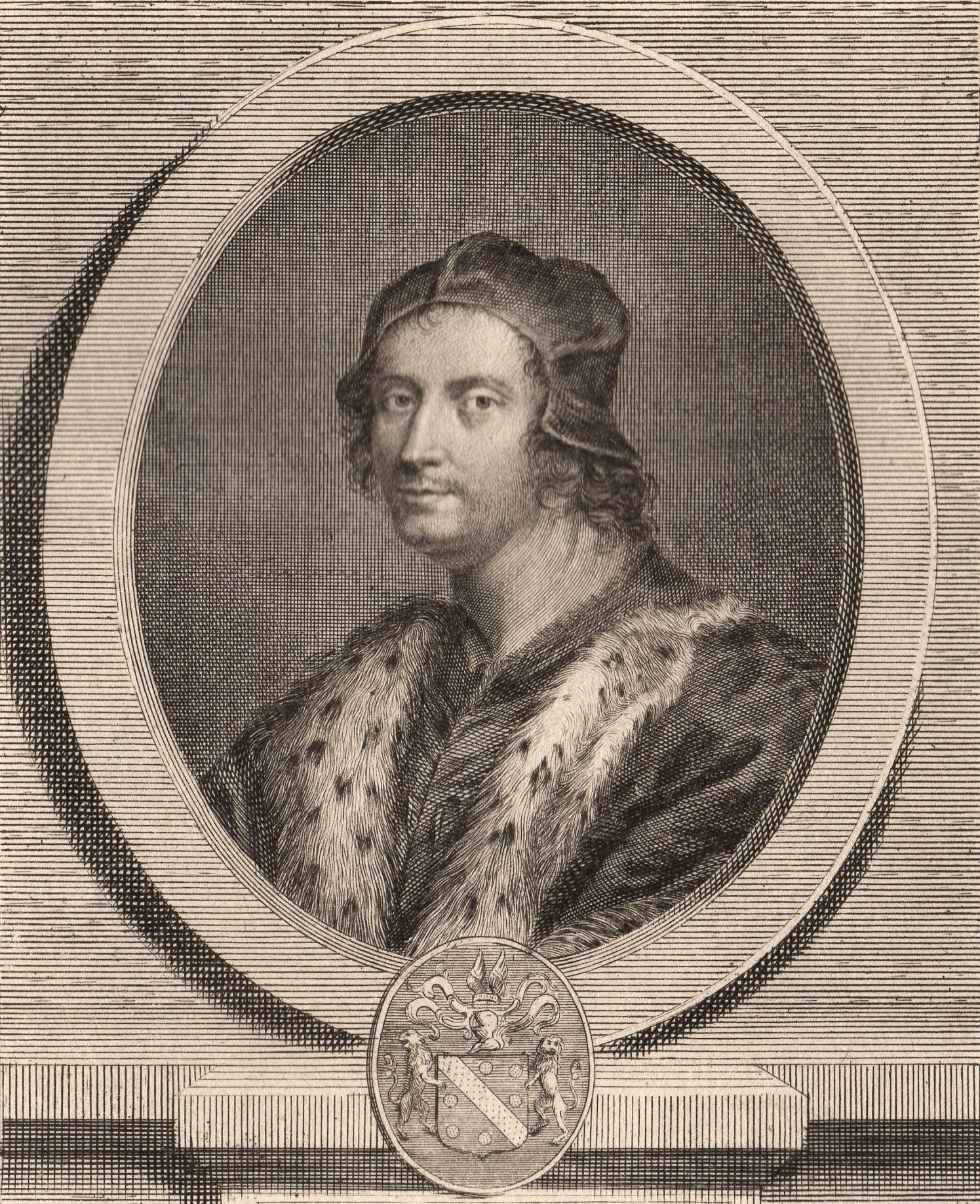
Jan Carondelet

Jan (Jean) I Carondelet (1428, Dole, Jura – 2 March 1502, Mechelen) was a Burgundian jurist and politician. He was the son of Jean Carondelet and Jeanne de Basan.

== Life ==
After promising studies, he became a judge in Besançon. Around 1460 Philip the Good took him on as master of requests and as one of his councillors. Charles the Bold confirmed him in these functions and trusted him with diplomatic treaties and negotiations.

From 1473 to 1477, Carondelet was the first chairman of the parliament of Mechelen that was created by Charles the Bold.

From 1480 to 1496 Carondelet was chancellor of the Duchy of Burgundy and the Burgundian Netherlands. In 1480 he bought the Castle of Solre-sur-Sambre from Antoine de Mortagne.

He was married to Marguerite de Chassey and they had six sons and five daughters. His oldest son was Claude I Carondelet and his second son was Jan II Carondelet. Another son was Ferry Carondelet.

== Bibliography ==
- J. P. Gachard, Jean Carondelet, in: Biographie nationale de Belgice, Book III, 1872.
