= Willem van Pamele =

Royal office-holder in the Habsburg Netherlands

Guillaume de Pamele or Willem van Pamele (1528–1591) was a royal office-holder in the Habsburg Netherlands during the Dutch Revolt. He served as president of the Council of Flanders and of the Privy Council of the Habsburg Netherlands.

== Life ==
Van Pamele was born in Bruges on 29 November 1528, the son of Adolphe de Joigny, called de Pamele, and Madeleine Vanden Heede. His father was a councillor of state and privy councillor. Willem entered public service as pensionary of the city of Bruges, and in this capacity was present at the abdication of Charles V. By letters patent of Philip II of Spain dated 14 May 1561, he was appointed master of requests to the Great Council of Mechelen. The same year, he married Anne Winnocq (1532–1596). The couple remained childless. In 1575 he became president of the Council of Flanders.

At the rebel coup in Ghent on 28 October 1577, he was able to evade capture. On 16 December 1579, the Prince of Parma ordered loyal Catholic members of the Council of Flanders to convene at Douai under Pamele's presidency. The loyalist councillors would continue to meet in Douai until 1585, when they were able to return to Ghent. Pamele himself was knighted by letters patent of 20 September 1581, and the same year became president of the Privy Council. He died in Brussels on 21 January 1591.

His heirs were his brothers, Jean and Adolphe, who erected a monumental tomb in Brussels minster recording his achievements. After his death his wife founded a Capuchin house in Bruges. After her own death she was buried with him in Brussels.
