= Filips Wielant =

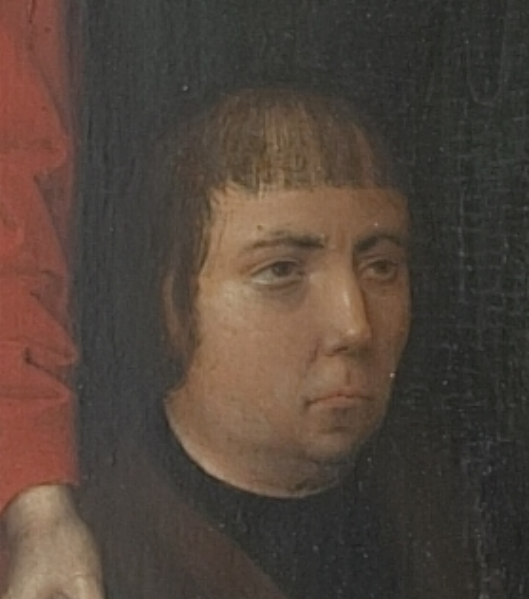
Donor portrait of Filips Wielant from Adriaen Isenbrandt's Presentation of Jesus in the Temple

Filips Wielant (1441/2–1520) was a magistrate and legal theorist in the Burgundian Netherlands, and a participant in the Flemish revolts against Maximilian of Austria.

== Life ==
Wielant was born in Ghent, the son of Jean Wielant, lord of Bavikhove, and Catherine de la Kethulle. His father, who died in Ghent on 1 July 1473, had served Philip the Good as secretary and was in 1463 appointed to the Council of Flanders.

Wielant graduated Licentiate of Laws from the University of Leuven on 5 December 1464. In 1473 he too was appointed to the Council of Flanders. On 16 November 1473 he married Joanna van Halewijn, daughter of the president of the Council of Holland. Wielant was one of the first members to be appointed to the Great Council of Mechelen when it was established at the end of 1473.

On 19 March 1474 he was entrusted with an enquiry into ducal rights. When the Great Council was suppressed under the Great Privilege on 11 February 1477 Wielant lost his position, but on 26 March Mary of Burgundy appointed him councillor and master of requests of her household.

In 1478, he was appointed mayor of the Liberty of Bruges (an area of countryside outside Bruges with city rights), and in 1480 receiver general. He was a supporter of Mary of Burgundy's husband, Maximilian of Austria, until Mary's death in 1482, when he opposed Maximilian's attempt to rule alone on behalf of their infant son Philip the Handsome. On 10 January 1483 Wielant was appointed to the regency council. On 14 September, Maximilian declared the regency council abolished, and on 14 October Wielant was among those arrested by gens d'armes in the service of Lancelot de Berlaimont and imprisoned at his castle near Maubeuge. Maximilian later denied having given orders for their arrest. Berlaymont was murdered on 2 February 1484 by the men of Philip of Cleves, but Wielant remained imprisoned.

In May 1484 those who had supported rule by a regency council rather than by the young duke's father were reconciled to Maximilian, and Wielant was released. He represented the Liberty of Bruges at the meeting of the Estates General in Dendermonde in June 1484.

On 28 February 1486 Wielant was again imprisoned, this time on the orders of Engelbert of Nassau, whom Maximilian had left in charge of his military forces in the Low Countries when he returned to Germany to seek election as King of the Romans. Wielant was transported to Heusden Castle, in the Duchy of Brabant, and held there until 1 September.

In May 1488, the newly re-established regency council appointed Wielant president of the Council of Flanders. On 28 October 1488, Maximilian responded by relieving him of his title as councillor and master of requests of the household, for "taking party against us and adhering to our rebel subjects in Flanders". Wielant in fact worked to find a compromise between the cities of Flanders and Maximilian, and was involved in the negotiations that led to the Peace of Cadzand on 19 July 1492. On 8 August Maximilian readmitted him to his position at court, and on 6 November reappointed him to the Council of Flanders.

On 22 January 1504, he was appointed to the reconstituted Great Council of Mechelen, serving on the court until his death. He took part in the commercial treaty negotiations at Bruges in June 1515, in which Thomas More was part of the English delegation. He died in Mechelen on 2 March 1520.

With Joanna van Halewijn he had seven children, five daughters and two sons. Two of his daughters and one of his sons died in infancy. His oldest son, Jean became a knight of Rhodes and died at Mechelen on 14 April 1518. He also had another daughter, outside wedlock, Elisabeth (born 31 October 1473), who became a nun in the Filles-Dieu convent in Ghent.

== Writings ==
- Tractaet van den Leenrechten na de Hoven van Vlaenderen (1491), a treatise on feudal tenancies in the jurisdiction of Flanders.
- Instructie gegeven der Stede van Hairlem, a proposed codification of the customary law of the city of Haarlem in the County of Holland, never implemented.
- Practycke Civile, a systematic overview of the manner of civil proceedings in the courts of Flanders, surviving in two versions, one from 1508 and one from 1519.
- Practycke Criminele, an overview of criminal proceedings, published by Joos de Damhouder under his own name in 1554.
- Recueil des Antiquités de Flandre, an overview of the history of the county of Flanders and its relations with its neighbours.
- A manuscript entitled Vorme ende concept tot het maken van eene Generale costume van het landt ende graefschap van Vlaenderen has also been attributed to Wielant, but doubtfully.
