= Jan van Mansdale =

Jan van Mansdale, also Jan I Keldermans (c. 1345 – 1425) was a Brussels sculptor. He is considered the ancestor of the Keldermans family from Mechelen, which produced many master builders and sculptors.

In Brussels, perhaps his hometown, Jan van Mansdale owned a house with the brewery In het Kelderken on Schildknaapstraat, which may explain his second name (kelder = cellar). He married Katrien Pippens ca. 1375-1380 and had at least three children: Pieter, Jan II and Elizabeth van Mansdale who was married to Antoine van Robbroeck. Around 1370 he had become a master of the brick and mortar craft.

Van Mansdale was initially known for carving ornate balustrades. His reputation soon reached beyond the city walls. In 1377 he was asked to take care of the decoration of the Great Hall in the Alderman's House in Mechelen. In 1384-85 he supplied eleven corbels with representations of the Nine Worthies, Noah's drunkenness and Abraham's Sacrifice of Isaac for the Mechelen Schepenhuis. This work has been preserved in situ. In the 1390s he also made the mausoleum of Franco de Mirabella and Maria van Gistel in St. Rumbold's Cathedral, which he completed in 1415-1416. The monument, decorated with pleurants, was destroyed in 1810, except for a few fragments, which were transferred to the Art & History Museum of Brussels. On stylistic grounds, the mausoleum of Jan II van Polanen in Breda has been tentatively attributed to Van Mansdale.
