= Charles-Philippe de Patin =

Vicomte ('Viscount') Charles-Philippe de Patin
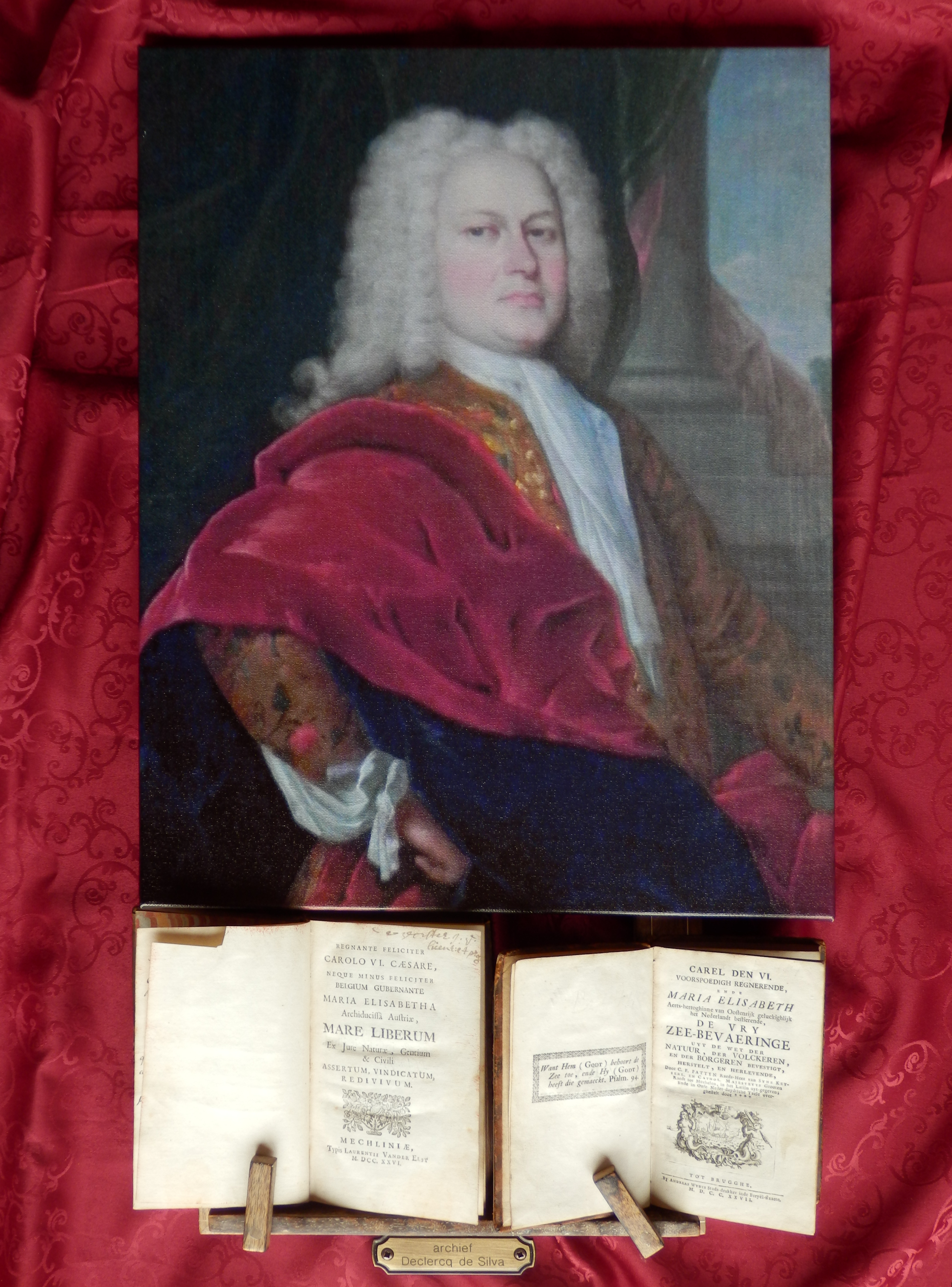
- Charles-Philippe viscount de Patin
- Born: Carolus Philippus de Patin; April 19, 1687; Ypres, Belgium (France at that time)
- Died: 17 July 1773 (aged 86); Prinsenhof, Ghent, Belgium
- Citizenship: French, Austrian Belgian
- Education: Studium Generale Lovaniense (Old University of Leuven)
- Spouse(s): Therese Waltrude du Bois (1715–1737), daughter of François du Bois and Catherine Devos.
- Children: Francois Guillaume de Patin (son); Leopold Joseph de Patin (son)
- Relatives: Pierre de Patin (father) (1660-1735); Catherine Therese de Smet (mother) (1663); Charles Joseph de Patin (brother) (1691–1762) (Note: Charles Joseph de Patin was responsible for the forest management in Austrian Belgium. Squire and Lord of Nonneland and Letuwe. He was first married to Marie Jacqueline de Voldere in 1717 and after her death he married Genevieve Mombry in 1732.); family Cotteau de Patin (Note: He established the new castle of Langemark after WWI, which currently serves as the town hall.); Nico F. Declercq; family de Patin de Langhemarck (Note: They established the Castle of Langemark in Belgium.); family Struye de Patin; family Vercruysse de Patin (Note: The last descendent of this branch was John Vercruysse, killed during WWI. The family resided in Voormezele in Belgium.); Paul Goethals (Note: Paul-François-Marie Goethals, S.J. (1832-1901), was a Belgian Jesuit priest who served as a missionary in British India and held the esteemed position of the first Archbishop of Calcutta.); Christian Goethals (Note: Christian Roger Xavier Marie Joseph Ghislain Goethals was a Belgian F1 racing driver born on 4 August 1928 in Heule and he died on 26 February 2003 in Kortrijk.)
- Writing career
- Language: Flemish, French, German, Latin

Charles-Philippe vicomte de Patin (Note: The family name 'de Patin' was consistently used late in the life of Charles-Philippe de Patin and was also used by all his descendants; the use of the French version 'de Patin' originates from the knowledge after a genealogical survey at the time when he received the title 'viscount' had revealed that the oldest known ancestors were from Cambrai in France and spelled their name as 'Patin'. This is the format that the National Library of Australia used to register de Patin's book Le Commerce maritime fondé sur le droit de la nature & des gens, sur l'autorité des loix civiles & des traitez de paix & rétabli dans sa liberté naturelle on microfilm, Libraries Australia ID 14445900.) (19 April 1687 – 17 July 1773) was a prominent figure in the Austrian Netherlands during the Age of Enlightenment. Born 1687, in Ypres, he gained recognition as a Flemish writer, poet, magistrate, and legal and fiscal expert. His notable contributions include the publication of Mare Liberum ex jure naturae, gentium & civili assertum, vindicatum, redevivum (Mare Liberum) in 1726. (Note: The work was later translated to French as Le commerce maritime fondé sur le droit de la nature & des gens, sur l'autorité des loix civiles & des traitez de paix, & rétabli dans sa liberté naturelle) (Note: This work is sometimes referred to as 'de Patin's Mare Liberum', to distinguish it from the book Mare Liberum earlier written by de Groot) Additionally, he served (Note: Note that when books, articles or websites are consulted the territory that is now called Belgium, is called Southern Netherlands, Austrian Netherlands, Austrian Belgium, Austrian Flanders, etc. Here the name Austrian Belgium is used because that is also how Charles-Philippe de Patin called his country on the final page of Mare Liberum when he wrote: "Courage Belges Autrichiens, Courage, Continuez a défendre avec intrépidité vos droits et votre liberté, et tout ensemble la liberté du genre humain.") as the President of the Council of Flanders from 1742 until his death in 1773, in Ghent. On 10 April 1715, he married Therese Waltrude du Bois, the daughter of François du Bois and Catherine Devos, in Ghent.

== Pseudonyms ==
Other forms of name and title were applied to de Patin in certain contexts. These include:

- Charles Philippe burghgrave de Patin – Burgghrave is old Flemish, it means 'viscount'
- Charles Philippe vicomte de Patin – Vicomte is 'viscount' in French
- Carolus Philippus Pattyn Iprensis – Official documents during the life of de Patin were written in Latin; Latin: Iprensis refers to where Charles Philippe had grown up, namely Ypres
- Patin van Ieper – Dutch: van Ieper means 'from Ypres'. Because de Patin was well known during his life, in certain documents they simply refer to him in such colloquial manner
- Charles-Philippe de Pattyn – This is the format that the National Library of the Netherlands used to register de Patin's book Le Commerce maritime fondé sur le droit de la nature & des gens, sur l'autorité des loix civiles & des traitez de paix & rétabli dans sa liberté naturelle when they shared a digitized version on Google Books on 13 December 2013
- Karel Filips Pattijn – a modern (c. 1960) Dutch form
- M. Pattyn – Name in Flemish as written by the publisher Vander Elst on de Patin's book printed in 1727, 'M' stands for Mister, Pattyn is the most common way this family name is spelled in Flanders by families that are not related to Charles-Philippe de Patin

== Ancestry ==
Charles-Philippe de Patin is a descendant of a long-standing aristocratic lineage, (Note: The notation 'de Patin' (sic) can for instance be found in Johan Roelstraste, Wilfried Devoldere, Lucien Alliet editors, 't Stamboompje, Zuid- en Middenwestvlaams v.v.f. krantje, 25ste jaargang, nr 1, januari 1997, p. 39 : De 4 1/2 bunderen te Sint-Baafs-Vijve, article by Egard Seynaeve, "Denombrementen van Zwevegem ter Kerke": (in Dutch) "Op 23 augustus 1499 werd tav Philips de Berghes, heer van Zwevegem, een denombrement gemaakt door Jan de Patin als kerkelijke voogd van Yzabeele vanden Bussch fa Jans". This Jan de Patin is most probably 'Jean de Patin' who appears in the reference of G. Van Hoorebeke and is the son of Wautier de Patin and grandfather of Michel de Patin who was married in 1500 to Proese Ambrosine vanden Berghe (also: de Berghes) from Kortrijk.) which has been characterized by G. Van Hoorebeke as possessing a "noble of race" status. The family's origins can be traced back to the 13th century, specifically to the castle of Selles in Cambrai, France. (Note: The name 'de Patin' would also be used in more recent times by descendants in maternal line combined with a name from a paternal line, such as 'Cotteau de Patin', 'Declercq de Patin', 'Struye de Patin', 'Vercruysse de Patin', etc. and when explicitly referring to family members who lived at Langemark the expression 'de Patin de Langhemarck' can be found although in civil records the latter appear simply as 'de Patin', hence 'de Langhemarck' was not a part of their name. There are no direct descendants in paternal line, carrying the name 'de Patin', alive anymore as can be found in De Ryckman de Betz, 'Armorial général de la Noblesse belge orne des armoiries figures dans les lettres patentes originales', Liege, H. Dessain, 1957, p. 358.) Additionally, the family has more recent ancestral ties to Geluwe, Menin, Dadizele, and Ypres during the 17th century.

The mother of Charles-Philippe de Patin was Catherine Therese de Smet, born in Ypres in 1663. His father was Pierre de Patin (Dadizele, 1660 – Bixschoote 1735), who held the titles of Lord of Langemarck, Shaepweide, Ter Beke, Burgcautere, and Nonneland. Pierre de Patin held the position of bailiff of the barony of Guysen and was a clerk at Geluwe near Ypres. Additionally, he served as a deputy magistrate for the noblemen and vassals at the Chamber and Lordship of Ypres, fulfilling various roles as an alderman and representative of the government. In 1699, he was appointed as a council member of the city of Ypres, and in 1705, he assumed the responsibility of distributing bourgeoisie rights for the city.

The paternal grandfather of Charles Philippe was Philippe de Patin, born in Menin in 1637, died 1712. He married Anne Vermeersch in 1637. Additionally, Charles Philippe's oldest sister, Adrienne de Patin, born in Menin 1634, died in Geluwe in 1710, was married to Marinus Vermeersch, Anne's brother. The Vermeersch family were land proprietors in Geluwe, while the de Patin family enjoyed affluence, partly owing to the inherited assets of Philippe de Patin's mother, Marie Douchy (1610–1681) of Geluwe. These assets were passed down through her grandfather's line, the de Peutevin family. According to De Pauw, it is noted that Charles-Philippe de Patin's uncle was involved in the brewing industry in Ypres, while his father, Pierre de Patin, engaged in the trade of commodities with the French. Charles-Philippe de Patin had a sibling named Charles Joseph de Patin (1691-1762). Charles Joseph had the titles of Squire and Lord of Nonneland and Letuwe and was entrusted with overseeing forest management in Austrian Belgium. In 1717, Charles Joseph entered into matrimony with Marie Jacqueline de Voldere, and after her decease, he contracted a second marriage with Genevieve Mombry in 1732.

== Early years and education ==
In 1687, Charles Philippe was born in Ypres, which had been under French control since the signing of the Treaty of Nijmegen on 17 September 1678. During this period, the city had undergone significant fortification efforts led by Sebastien de Vauban. Despite his upbringing in French Ypres, Charles-Philippe decided to pursue his studies at the Studium Generale Lovaniense (the Old University of Leuven), situated on the Belgian side of the border within the Spanish Netherlands, rather than enrolling in a French university. This choice reflects the de Patin family's allegiance to what would eventually be recognized as Austrian Belgium. Notably, this loyalty was acknowledged in Charles Philippe's letter of nobility, wherein Charles VI, granted him the esteemed title of viscount. The text mentioned above also refers to the family's steadfast adherence to Catholicism throughout the tumultuous French wars of religion. In the Spanish Netherlands, it was customary for registrars to spell the family name as Pattyn or Patyn. However, the family maintained their original French name, 'de Patin'. (Note: In de Patin's nobility letter by Charles VI and in a reconfirmation by Maria Theresa, he is referred to as 'de Patin', 'Patin', 'Pattyn', 'de Patyn' and 'de Pattyn' which clarifies an ambiguity that clearly also existed during his lifetime.) (Note: On Charles-Philippe de Patin's gravestone the spelling 'de Patin' was used which clearly indicated his own preference and that of his descendants, related to the knowledge of their French roots.)

During the period of the Spanish Succession conflict in 1710, Charles Philippe accomplished the acquisition of a Master's Degree in Law from the University of Leuven (Studium Generale Lovaniense, now usually referred to as the Old University of Leuven). Charles Philippe served as the fiscus at the University of Leuven in 1709 and held the dean position at the Collegium Baccalaureorum.

== During reign of Charles VI ==
Charles-Philippe de Patin rapidly gained recognition as a prominent legal practitioner towards the conclusion of the Spanish Netherlands. The establishment of the Austrian Netherlands occurred in 1715. On 12 October 1720, de Patin, a lawyer by profession, was appointed as a counselor of the Council of Flanders by Prince Eugene of Savoy, who served as the governor of the Netherlands from 1716 to 1725. On 8 April 1721, Charles Philippe was granted the title of Conseiller et Maitre aux Requêtes ordinaire de notre Grand Conseil by a decree. Subsequently, on 12 April 1721, he solemnly swore an oath in the presence of Christophe Ernest, the head of the Council, who held the title of Count de Baillet.

During the early contention period, a conflict arose between Austrian Belgium, the Maritime Powers of Britain, and the United Dutch Provinces regarding establishing an Indian Company similar to the East and West Indian Companies. This conflict centered around the Ostend Company in Austrian Belgium, which received a patent from Charles VI, on 19 December 1722. In 1726, Charles Philippe authored the first iteration of his literary work titled Mare Liberum ('freedom of the seas'). During that period, the Austrian emperor had not yet enlisted the services of de Patin. Consequently, his work, as stated by De Pauw, was composed to safeguard the economic autonomy of Austrian Belgium. This was achieved by challenging the prevailing monopolies held by Britain and the Dutch East India Company and advocating for the legitimate rights of the Ostend Company. However, the media widely disseminated favorable remarks about his work and expressed support for granting de Patin elevated social positions.

De Patin was sent to the Congress of Soissons by Charles VI, at the behest of his sister Maria-Elisabeth. This mission aimed to negotiate with France, England, and the Dutch East India Company over the Ostend Company. Patin's French heritage facilitated his efforts to undermine the alliances between France and its partner nations to prioritize the Ostend Company's maintenance. The Austrians showed a willingness to relinquish the Ostend Company within the context of broader diplomatic objectives, expecting favorable outcomes from Spain and the other nations at the Congress of Soissons. However, De Patin persistently advocated for the Ostend Company and upheld the ideas of unrestricted navigation as outlined in his work, Mare Liberum. The Ostend Company's efforts to build an Austrian trade route to India were ultimately unsuccessful due to the provisions outlined in the Treaty of Vienna on 16 March 1731. This treaty stipulated that Charles VI would cease any future endeavors to establish such a trading route. The Belgian Austrians and Charles VI, Holy Roman Emperor, recognized de Patin's fervent efforts to save the Ostend Company and appointed him on 5 August 1733, for a place in the High Court. Due to this rationale, de Patin embarked on a journey to Vienna during the autumn of 1733 while his ailing spouse remained in Austrian Belgium. Per an Imperial order issued on 5 December 1735, in Vienna, (Note: The decree of 1735 was later adjusted by a new decree on 15 October 1755, to better define the weapon shield, and on 25 October 1779, the decree was re-interpreted in favor of all his descendants to carry the title of Viscount. The three diplomas are published in the book by G. Van Hoorebeke. Baron A. de Vinck la Vignette Couthuin is in the possession of the original diplomas.) de Patin was granted the title of Viscount as a result of his distinguished achievements and the illustrious lineage of his aristocratic ancestors, which can be traced back to the 13th century.

== As a Viscount during the reign of Charles VI ==
Following acquiring the esteemed title of Viscount, de Patin assumed the role of 'Conseiller-Regent' (Regent Advisor) at the Supreme Court of Austrian Belgium. The Supreme Court served as the governing body responsible for overseeing the national political affairs of Austrian Belgium, allowing de Patin to advocate for the welfare of his compatriots. Charles-Philippe de Patin, in addition, was involved in ending a junta in Vienna. On 10 October 1737, this junta conveyed its dissent against governess Maria-Elisabeth's intentions to implement a stringent censorship policy on literature in Austrian Belgium. In addition, contrary to Maria-Elisabeth's preferences, de Patin recommended the issuance of a decree on 6 December 1737, aimed at restricting the extent of legal protection enjoyed by clerics.

In 1737, Therese Waltrude du Bois, the wife of De Patin, died in Brussels. Following her death, de Patin continued to engage in various activities and showed a profound interest in the trading relations between Austrian Belgium and India, as well as the Ostend Company. In 1738, de Patin was contacted on many occasions by various bankers and Meijer zum Goldstein with the proposition of establishing a new company in Hamburg as a replacement for the Ostend Company. In an epistolary communication addressed to her sibling, Charles VI, on 9 April 1738, Governess Maria-Elisabeth expressed her determination to dispatch de Patin to Antwerp. This decision was motivated by his notable expertise and his amiable and courteous demeanor. This mission aimed to participate in the protracted negotiations that commenced on 27 August 1737, between envoys representing the maritime powers and Charles VI. The objective was to reach a consensus over a novel trade agreement outlined in article XXVI of the Barrier Treaty of 1715.

The issue about article XXVI was not solely the imposition of excessively burdensome tax rates on Austrian Belgium's trade with England and the United Dutch Provinces, which originated from the English-Batavian occupation until the article was replaced with a new one. Rather, the concern lied in the deliberate prolongation of negotiations by England and the United Dutch Provinces for a period exceeding 22 years to preserve the existing tax system in their favor for as long as possible. De Patin presented suggestions to England and the United Dutch Provinces, which were based on the principles of reciprocity. These ideas included establishing unrestricted movement for people and a balanced tax system for commerce between Austrian Belgium and England and between Austrian Belgium and the United Dutch Provinces. The ideas put forward by the maritime powers were rejected, with the assertion that Austrian Belgium was effectively under occupation. Despite several efforts made by de Patin, a new agreement was not successfully reached.

An intriguing occurrence took place in the life of de Patin between the years 1738 and 1740. Following the death of Pierre Van Volden, a vacancy arose within the Grand Court of Austrian Belgium. The High Court would typically be approached to identify a suitable candidate for this post. De Patin emerged as the preferred candidate by Count de Fonseca. Nevertheless, De Patin was also summoned to Vienna to fulfill his Emperor's High Court duties. However, Governess Maria-Elisabeth expressed her disapproval of his holding two offices simultaneously. The correspondence between Maria-Elisabeth and the High Court provides evidence of the high regard de Patin was held in Austrian Belgium and Vienna. Charles VI was compelled to dispatch four correspondences to Brussels to reiterate his directive to summon de Patin back to Vienna. Feeling dissatisfied with the denial of his request to hold both roles concurrently, Patin arrived in Vienna six days before the passing of Charles VI, on 20 October 1740. Patin's reappointment to the High Court is notable due to his unique background as the only delegate with ties to Austrian Belgium during that period.

== During the reign of Maria Theresa ==
Maria Theresa, born in 1717, ascended to the throne on 20 October 1740, succeeding Charles VI. She assumed the positions of Queen of Hungary and Bohemia and Archduchess of Austria. Maria Theresa later attained the esteemed Holy Roman Empress consort position on 13 September 1745. Maria Theresa strongly preferred Charles-Philippe de Patin and, on 5 October 1741, extended to him the prestigious position of President of the Council of Flanders. On 19 December 1742, de Patin, who had been widowed since 1737, arrived in Ghent with his children. In recognition of his acceptance of the Presidency, Maria Theresa provided him with the Prinsenhof Palace as his official home. The commemoration of his arrival in Ghent was marked with a horse parade and a display of fireworks. De Patin formally swore an oath in the presence of Count de Silva Tarouca and officially assumed the role of President from Counselor Coppens.

As President of the Council of Flanders, a prominent court in Austrian Belgium, De Patin held a position of great significance as a magistrate. This role allowed him to assume a significant political role within his country, as he was closely affiliated with and served as the primary representative of the Empress. The war of the Austrian succession, which took place from 1740 to 1748, was instigated by many European powers. The primary justification for this conflict was the contention that Maria Theresa, as a female heir, lacked legitimacy in succeeding Charles VI. This war would significantly influence the trajectory of de Patin's career. On the morning of 12 June 1745, the forces under the command of French King Louis XV successfully captured the city of Ghent following a military assault that took place between Sint-Pieters-Poort and the river Schelde.

In response to this development, the Council of Flanders decided to dispatch de Patin as an emissary to the French King, who was then situated at the Castle of Rooborst, to extend greetings to the monarch. De Patin delivered a speech to Louis XV, after which the monarch decided to safeguard and defend the Council of Flanders. With a strong sense of loyalty towards his Empress, the Patin expressed his desire to the French Marquis d'Argenson to relinquish his role as President of the Council of Flanders. He articulated his preference to align himself with his Empress rather than continue serving under Louis XV. According to Marquis d'Argenson, in a conversation with de Patin, it was suggested that Louis XV would likely grant his plea for abdication. Additionally, Marquis d'Argenson expressed his desire to have similarly devoted followers. De Patin was granted a passport and authorization to escape. He said farewell to the Council in a most courteous manner and proceeded to travel to Brussels, followed by Roermond, Aix-la-Chapelle (Aachen), and Vienna, where he remained until the conclusion of the war. Meanwhile, the abode known as Prinsenhof was repurposed into a medical facility for military purposes. During the occupation, the remaining members of the Council retained their positions.

Meanwhile, De Patin was formulating strategies to enhance the global commerce of his nation. The proposal to build a roadway between Liege and Germany was first proposed by de Patin. The aforementioned proposal was subsequently implemented by Marquis de Botta-Adorno. Following the Treaty of Aix-la-Chapelle on 18 October 1748, the administration of Austrian Belgium was entrusted to a State Council, with Charles-Philippe de Patin assuming a prominent position within it. The Council was headquartered in Roermond. The State Council exercised its governance until it transferred its authority to Charles of Lorraine on 23 April 1749. The Marquis de Botta-Adorno, who served as the plenipotentiary minister from 1749 to 1753, with extensive knowledge of the attributes of de Patin.

The period after 1750 saw a notable era characterized by tranquility and economic well-being in Austrian Belgium. The time in question also saw a flourishing of the Age of Enlightenment. Charles-Philippe de Patin, a prominent figure in the political landscape of the day, served as a trustee of the central government in Brussels and Vienna. Additionally, he held the esteemed position of President of the Council of Flanders, exerting significant influence in politics during this period. Maria Theresa entrusted de Patin with the task of establishing equitable trade agreements with the maritime powers of Europe. However, the powers mentioned above stipulated that Austrian Belgium must establish a defensive barrier against France. This measure was intended to safeguard not only Austrian Belgium but also the Dutch Provinces from future incursions by the French. Implementing these structures incurred significant expenses, leading to a substantial financial burden on the municipalities of Austrian Belgium. In response to the Enlightenment era, urban centers rejected granting exclusive advantages to certain cities in the national decision-making process, unfairly burdening other towns with shared expenditures. Therefore, it was imperative to implement political and financial changes, beginning with enhanced transparency measures to prevent unauthorized spending. The individual responsible for overseeing the modernization of the economics and politics of Austrian Belgium was Charles Philippe Jean, Viscount de Cobenzl. He received guidance from Charles-Philippe de Patin, and Jean Jacques Philippe, Viscount Vilain XIIII, throughout this process. In correspondence with Cobenzl, De Patin argued against the complete annihilation of basic laws, asserting that a more prudent approach would include making necessary amendments. This approach aimed to prevent any potential misuse of authority or financial resources, ensuring the comprehensive endorsement of the changes by all strata of society. Subsequent to that period, voting rights in Austrian Belgium ceased to be predicated on historical privileges, instead being contingent upon significance and financial capability, coinciding with the ongoing process of economic rationalization. De Patin assumed the role of an independent examiner and oversaw many investigations into financial irregularities inside the nation.

De Patin had a significant presence in Austrian Belgium until his ability to engage in future endeavors was hindered by blindness in 1771. On 25 March 1772, Maria Theresa permitted him to resign while maintaining his privileges, as suggested by the Secret Council, Charles of Lorraine, and Chancellor Kaunitz. In her correspondence, Maria Theresa notably referred to de Patin as her devoted servant, ce bon serviteur, and offered him a remarkable favor. This favor, conferred upon retirement, was considered the highest accolade one could receive. Charles-Philippe de Patin, a prominent figure, met his demise on 17 July 1773, at the venerable age of 86, inside the confines of the Prinsenhof located in Ghent. The interment of his remains would occur inside the Langemark church's confines. The tomb of Charles-Philippe de Patin, along with the accompanying church, ancestral castle, and the whole community of Langemark, suffered destruction throughout World War I. On 25 October 1779, Maria Theresa issued a decree granting the descendants of de Patin the privilege to hold both the noble titles of Knight and Viscount concurrently. This distinction is unparalleled in the annals of nobility and noble titles.

== Bibliography ==
Several works known to have been written by de Patin, have disappeared. The most prominent works that survived are listed below. There are, above, all, interesting works written about him.

=== Mare Liberum ===
- Charles Philippe vicomte de Patin (C. P. Pattyn), Mare Liberum, 1726 (in Latin), printed by Mechliniae, typis Laurentii Van der Elst. Complete title: Regnante feliciter Carolo VI. Caesare, neque minus feliciter Belgium gubernante Maria Elisabetha Archiducissa Austriae, mare liberum ex jure naturae, gentium & civili assertum, vindicatum, redivivum. This book would appear in 4 editions. The publication year 1726 is not indicated but appears in an announcement of the book in a newspaper of 1726.
- Charles Philippe vicomte de Patin (C. P. Pattyn), De vry zee-bevaeringe, 1726 (Mare Liberum in Dutch), printed by Andreas Wydts standsdrukker inde Breyel-straete, Brugge. Complete title: Carel den VI. Voorspoedigh regnerende, ende Maria Elisabeth Aerts-hertoginne van Oostenrijk geluckighlijk het Nederlandt bestierende, de vry zee-bevaeringe uyt de wet der natuur, der volckeren, en der borgeren bevestigt, herstelt, en herlevende, door C. P. Pattyn raeds-heer van Syne Keyserl. en Cathol. Majesteyts Grooten Raedth tot Mechelen, in het Latijn uyt-gegeven; ende in onse Neder-duydtsche taele overghestelt
- Charles Philippe vicomte de Patin (M. Pattyn), Le Commerce Maritime et la liberté naturelle, 1727 (Mare Liberum in French), printed by Laurent Vander Elst, sur la Place, Malines (Mechelen). Complete title : Le Commerce Maritime fondé sur le droit de la nature & des gens, sur l'autorité des loix civiles & des traitez de paix, & rétabli dans la liberté naturelle, traduit du Latin de M. Pattyn, augmenté & enrichi des notes de l'auteur dans cette édition.

=== Other work ===
- Charles-Philippe de Patin, "Nieuwjaarsverzen aan Aybert van Huerne de Schievelde, burgemeester van Brugge, met Franse begeleidingsbrief", reprinted in chapter 6 of "Latijnse poëzie van de 17e en 18e eeuw" where work is reprinted from Arnoldus Valcke, Franciscus Vanden Heuvel, Jan Vander Meulen, T. L. B. A., Charles-Philippe de Patin.
