= Goswin de Fierlant =

president of the Great Council of Mechelen
- In office 1773–1794
- Monarchs: Maria Theresa (1740—1780), Joseph II (1780—1790), Leopold II (1790—1792)
- Governors General: Charles Alexander of Lorraine (1744—1780), Maria Christina of Austria-Lorraine and Albert Casimir of Saxony (1781—1793), Charles of Austria-Lorraine (1793—1794)
- Preceded by: Guillaume-Ignace Pycke

Personal details
- Born: around 1735 Duchy of Brabant, Austrian Netherlands
- Died: 19 February 1804 Brussels, Dyle, French Empire
- Spouse: Marie-Thérèse de Nény
- Parent(s): Guillaume de Fierlant and Anne-Catherine van den Broeck

Goswin Anne-Marie Félix de Fierlant (ca. 1735—1804) was a holder of high office in the Austrian Netherlands who served on the Council of State, as the last president of the Great Council, and briefly as Chief President of the Privy Council of the Habsburg Netherlands.

== Life ==
Goswin de Fierlant was born around 1735 to Guillaume de Fierlant, schout of Turnhout, and Anne-Catherine van den Broeck. He began his public career with the city council of Brussels. In 1754, he was admitted to the Roodenbeke Lineage, one of the Seven Noble Houses of Brussels. In 1768 he was appointed secretary to the Privy Council of the Habsburg Netherlands, and the following year became a privy councillor himself. On 28 August 1771 he married Marie-Thérèse de Nény, eldest daughter of Patrice de Nény, chief president of the Privy Council.

By letters patent of 26 December 1773, Fierlant was appointed president of the Great Council, and the following January he was also made a Councillor of State. In 1787, during the reforms of Joseph II, he was transferred to Brussels as head of a new Council of Appeal, but when this project was abandoned he was reinstated as president of the Great Council, retaining the position throughout the political changes of the Brabant Revolution (1788—1793). In 1793, at the second Austrian restoration, he was appointed Chief President of the Privy Council. His career ended with the French invasion of 1794. He died in Brussels on 19 February 1804.

Government offices
Preceded by Guillaume-Ignace Pycke	President of the Great Council; 1773-1794	Succeeded by Council dissolved
