= Nicolaas Everaerts =

Dutch jurist

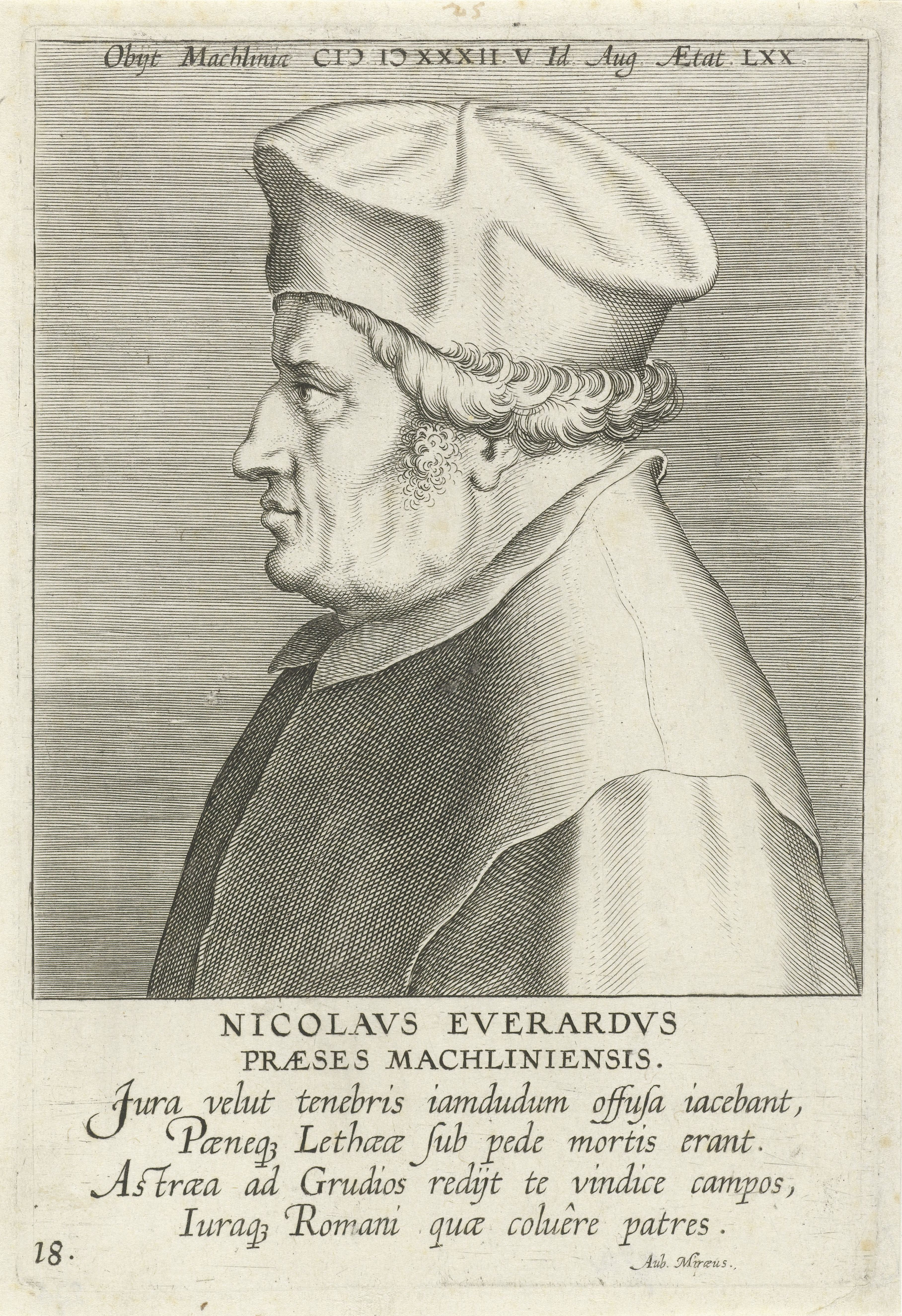

Klaas Evertszoon, also called Nicolaus Everardi (1461/62–1532) was a Dutch jurist and the father of Johannes Secundus, an acclaimed poet. He is not to be confused with Nicolaus Everardi (1495–1570) and his son Nicolaus Everardi (1537–86), both professors in Ingolstadt.

Born in Grijpskerke, he studied in Leuven, where he became rector of the university in 1504. He also held various ecclesiastical offices, and in the service to the Bishop of Cambrai befriended Erasmus of Rotterdam. In 1508 he was appointed to the Supreme Court of the Netherlands, the Great Council of Mechelen, in 1510 as president of the Court of Holland and in 1528 as president of the Grote Raad, wielding great influence in these offices.

His only work published during his lifetime, Topicorum seu de locis legalibus liber (1516) as well as the posthumously published Responsa sive consilium (1554) came to be of great practical importance to the jurists of the time.

Government offices
| Preceded by Judocus Laurys | 3rd President of the Great Council | Succeeded by Lambert de Briarde, Lord of Liezele |
