= Keldermans family =

Family of Flemish artists, sculptors and architects

Keldermans is a family of artists, originating from Mechelen (an independent city surrounded by the Duchy of Brabant). The members of the family were mostly architects working in the Brabantine Gothic style. As the most important architects of their time in the Netherlands, they defined the Brabantine Gothic style, and their works can still be seen today in cities like Mechelen, Brussels, Antwerp, Ghent, Lier, Middelburg and Gouda. Anthonis II and Rombout II were court architects for Charles V. Laurens II, last in the line, was influenced by Renaissance architecture and marked the end of the Gothic period in this region. The Keldermans family became known for the design and construction of the large tower of St Rumbold's Cathedral in Mechelen . Jan II qualifies most as the designer, the architect and the most important master builder. However, he would not see the start of the works himself and the first stone was therefore laid under the supervision of his son Andries . Other members of the Keldermans family who successively directed the works are Anthonis I, Anthonis II, Rombout II and Laurens II.

== Family tree ==
Jan I (1345–1425) sculptor
Jan II (1375–1445) architect
Andries I (1400–1488) city architect of Mechelen	Rombout I (1420–1489) glass painter	Jan III sculptor city halls of Gouda and Middelburg	Matthijs I sculptor in Leuven and Middelburg
Anthonis I (c. 1440–1512) city architect of Mechelen city hall of Middelburg	Matthijs II (fl. 1478–1495) sculptor
Anthonis II (d. 1515) architect for Charles V and city of Mechelen	Rombout II (1460–1531) architect for Charles V and city of Mechelen	Laurens I (fl. 1485) sculptor	Anthonis III sculptor in Spain
Laurens II (d. 1534) architect

== Name ==
The actual family name was Van Mansdale. Keldermans (Dutch for cellar man) was a nickname given to Jan I because the family house was nicknamed 't Kelderken (the cellar). The family was not happy with the nickname and usually continued to sign documents with the name "Van Mansdale".
