= Jan van Lokeren =

Flemish sculptor

Jan van Lokeren (fl. 1375 – 1381) was a Flemish sculptor and woodcarver mostly active in Mechelen.

== Biography ==
Jan van Lokeren was a sculptor, chiefly active in Mechelen, who specialized in woodcarvings. He probably lived in Mechelen since as early as 1359.

In 1375–1378, he and Herman van Blankene made part of the sculptures of the Mechelen Schepenhuis, the oldest aldermen's house. The work carried out by Van Lokeren and Van Blankene included twelve wooden balkzolen sculpted with secular and biblical scenes, including the legend of Saint Christopher, Daniel in the lions' den, and the Sacrifice of Abraham. One of the balkzolen also depicts a scene from the legend of Sint-Niklaas. This work is characterized by the traditional and "architecture-bound" 14th-century style. In October 1389, the jacquemart for St. Rumbold's Cathedral in Mechelen was commissioned from Van Lokeren. This sculpture was painted and gilded. Van Lokeren was an esteemed engineer and was renowned for this kind of works. Already in 1381 the city of Leuven had commissioned him a wooden mannequin with the same purpose. The Leuven jacquemart, made of hazel wood, was nicknamed Maître Jean, or Meester Jan.

== Sources ==
- Roggen, D. (1936). Het beeldhouwwerk van het Mechelse schepenhuis. Amsterdam: Gentsche bijdragen tot de kunstgeschiedenis 3. pp. 86–103.
- Thieme, Ulrich; Becker, Felix (1929). Allgemeines Lexikon der bildenden Künstler : von der Antike bis zur Gegenwart. Leipzig: Seeman. p. 336.
