= Joos de Damhouder =

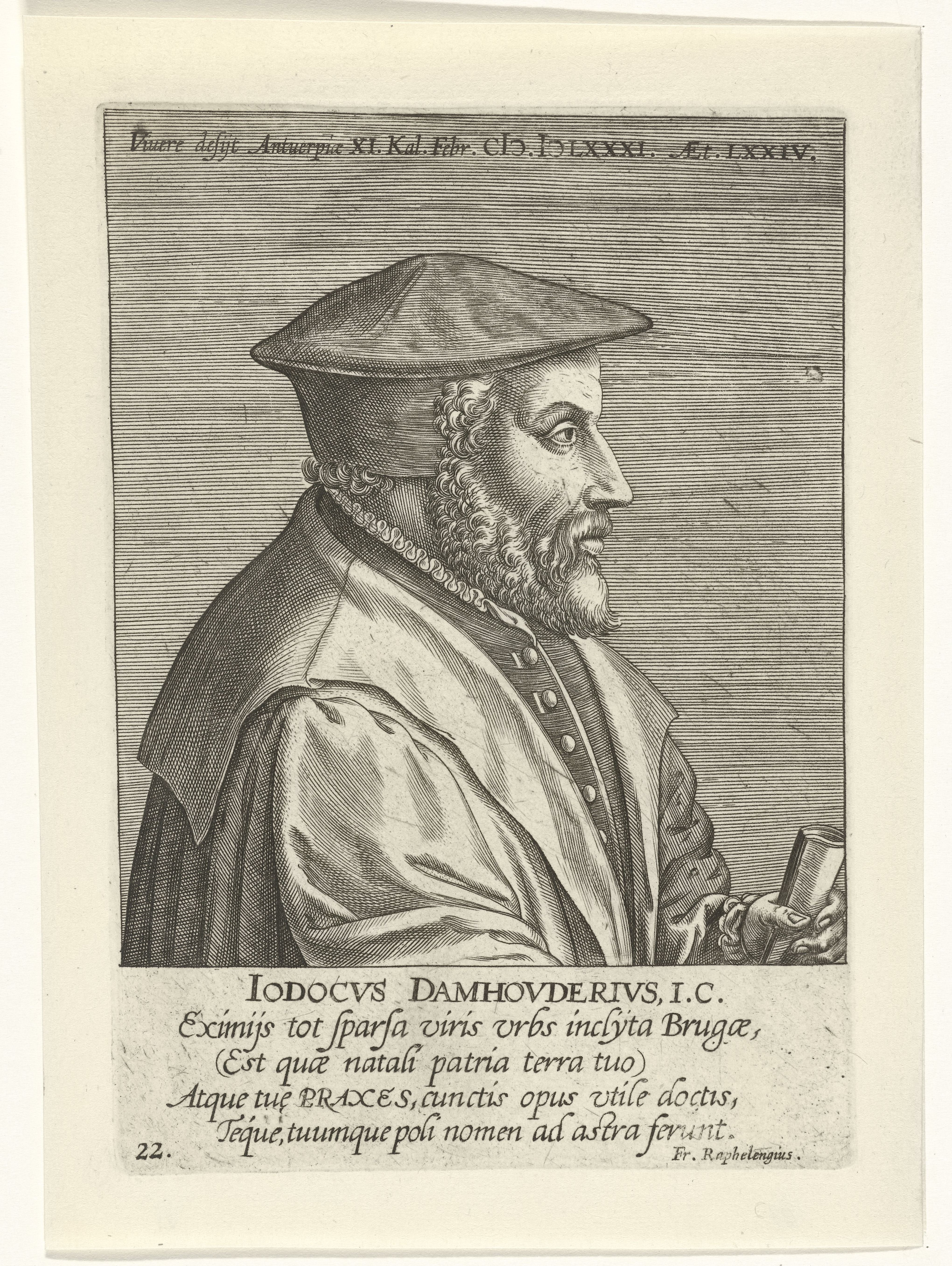
Portrait of Joos de Damhouder engraved by Philip Galle

Joos de Damhouder (25 November 1507, Bruges – 22 January 1581, Antwerp), also referred to as Joost, Jost, Josse or Jodocus (de) Damhouder, was a jurist from Bruges, in the County of Flanders (then part of the Seventeen Provinces). His writings had a lasting influence on European criminal law.

== Life ==
Born in Bruges, de Damhouder studied law in Leuven and Orléans. After obtaining his doctorate in 1533, he practiced law as an advocate in Bruges. In 1537 he was appointed legal advisor of the city authorities, from which office he retired in 1550 to become clerk of the urban criminal court. In 1552 he was made a member of the Council of Finance by Mary of Hungary, governor of the Habsburg Netherlands, and held that office until 1575. He died 1581 in Antwerp, six years after his wife, with whom he had had three daughters and a son.

== Writings ==
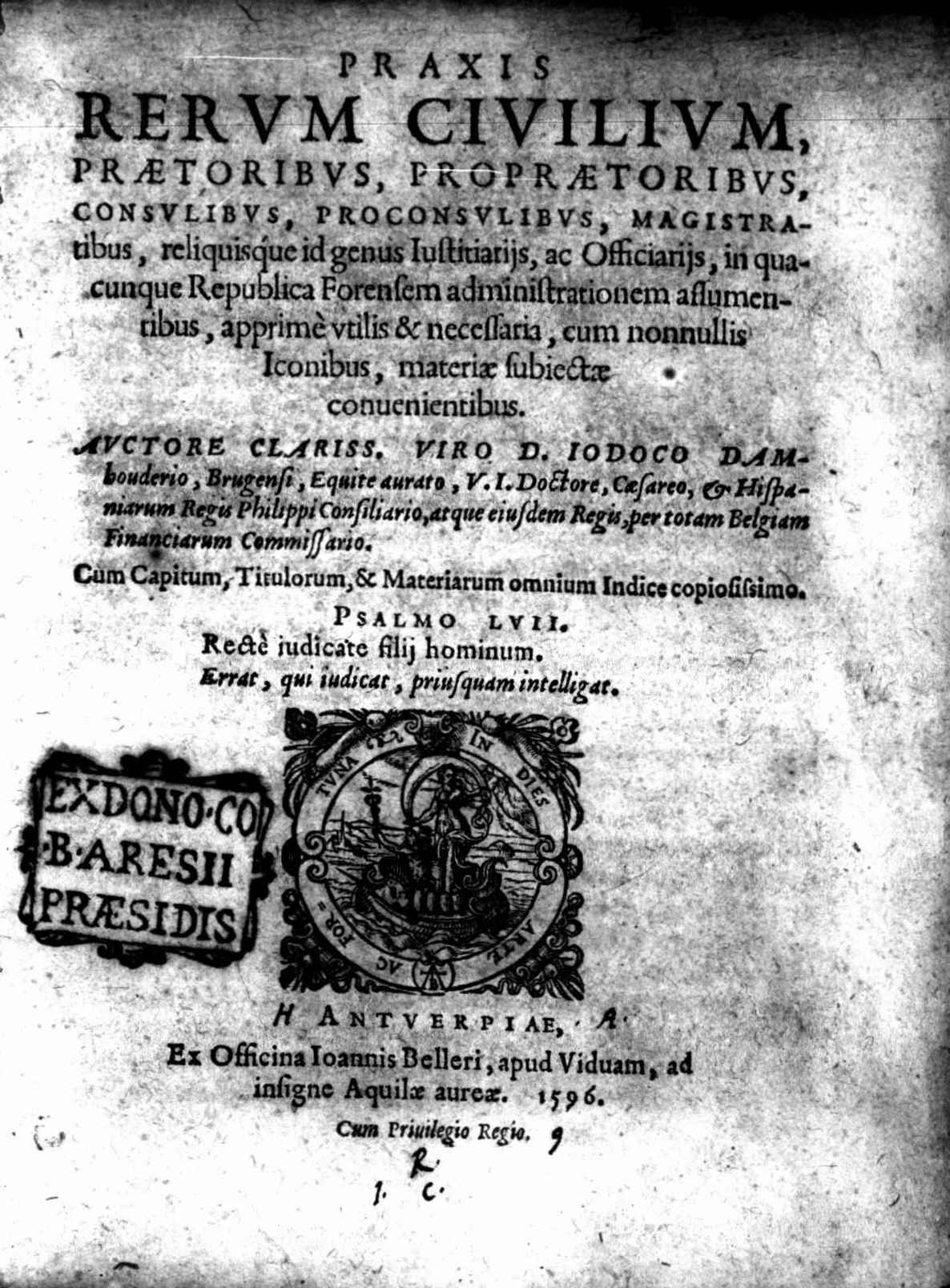
Praxis rerum civilium, 1596 edition

His principal work was the Praxis rerum criminalium (1554), a manual on the practice of criminal law, which he almost entirely plagiarised from an unpublished text by Filips Wielant and from other works. The book was a great success and saw numerous translations in other European languages, partly due to de Damhouder's novel approach of illustrating the various crimes and procedural stages with woodcuts. He later published a complementary work on civil law, the Praxis rerum civilum (1567), which was also an unattributed translation of a work by Wielant.

== Witch trials ==
The most immediate impact of de Damhouder's works was on the witch trials of the time, in which the Praxis rerum criminalium and its translations were cited regularly as fundamental works. The Praxis dedicated a lengthy 64 paragraphs to witchcraft, copied in large part from Paulus Grillandus's Tractatus de sortilegiis. According to the Praxis, witchcraft was a heinous crime that went unpunished too often because of the ignorance of magistrates, and which also covered love charms, fortune-telling, astrology and other superstitious practices. De Damhouder expanded on this by providing detailed practical advice (backed up by examples from his own court practice) on how to conduct interrogations of suspected witches under torture. These included, for example, the recommendation to shave off all hair and to inspect all orifices of the suspect, in order to uncover hidden magical amulets that would make the wearer withstand torture. He asserted that a single indication of guilt was sufficient for torture to be applied to achieve a confession, though he did recognize that too much torture can produce false confessions.
