= Lambert de Briarde, Lord of Liezele =

Flemish judge (died 1557)

Lambert de Briarde, Lord of Liezele sometimes Lambrecht van den Bryaerde (died 10 October 1557) was a Flemish judge.

== Family ==
His family belonged to the old nobility dating from the 13th century. He was born in Duinkerke, the youngest son of Andries de Briarde, Lord of Coye. His older brother Charles was mayor of the Brugse Vrije. Lambert was married to Marguerite Micault. They had two children:

- Nicolas de Briarde, died 1580. Married Adriana de Deurnaghle
- Lievine de Briarde. Married Gijsbrecht of Bronchorst, Lord of Schooten.

== Career ==
He obtained a degree of Doctor in Canon Law in Louvain and started a career in Flanders. In 1519, he was advocatus in the Council of Flanders in Ghent, where he participated in major cases. He became master of requests of the Great Council in 1522, and was promoted to President in 1532 by request of Charles V until his death. He served almost a quarter of a century as President

Besides his career he was sent on diplomatic missions in service of the Emperor and the governess Margaret of Parma. He was sent to negotiate during the Revolt of Ghent.

He is buried in St John of Mechelen.

Government offices
Preceded by Nicolaas Everaerts	4th President of the Great Council; 1532–1556	Succeeded by Nicolaas II Everaerts
