= Schepenhuis, Mechelen =

Aldermen's House
- Schepenhuis (Dutch)
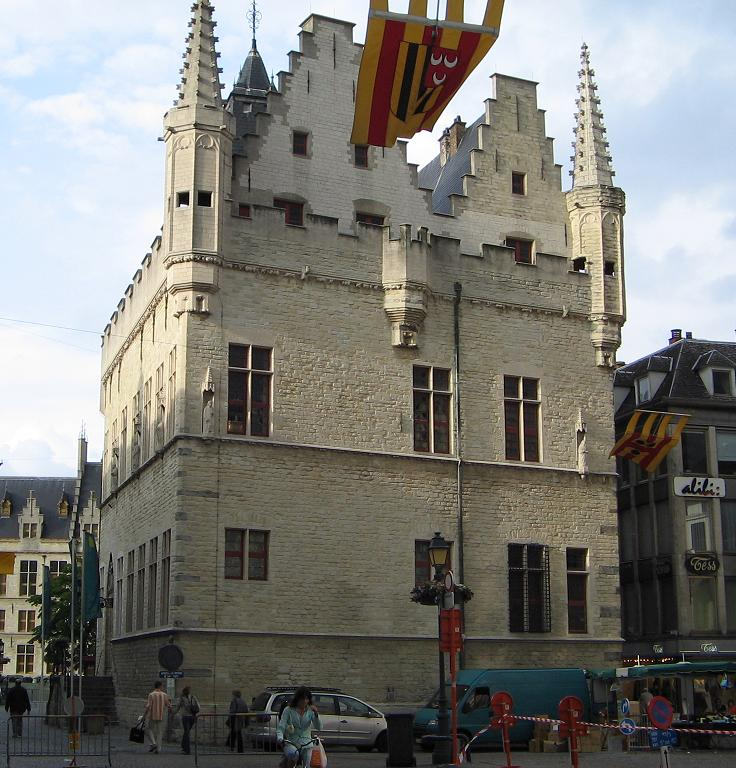
- Schepenhuis in Mechelen, seen from the IJzerenleen
- Interactive map of the Aldermen's House area

General information
- Type: Town hall
- Architectural style: Gothic
- Location: Mechelen, Flemish Brabant, Belgium
- Coordinates: 51°01′39″N 4°28′46″E

The Schepenhuis (Aldermen's House) of Mechelen, Flemish Brabant, Belgium, is a building where the city's aldermen held their meetings in the Middle Ages. It is located on the edge of the Grote Markt (main square), between the latter and the IJzerenleen and is considered the first stone 'town hall' of Flanders. The Schepenhuis was also the original seat of the Parlement or Great Council of the Duchy of Burgundy.

== History ==
=== Early history ===
In the 13th century, Mechelen experienced an economic revival due to the flourishing cloth trade. As a result, the need for buildings grew. In 1288 it was decided to erect a stone building for the aldermen's bench, which until then met in the open air. The building was expanded between 1374 and 1375. The decoration was done by André Beauneveu and Jan van Mansdale, among others.

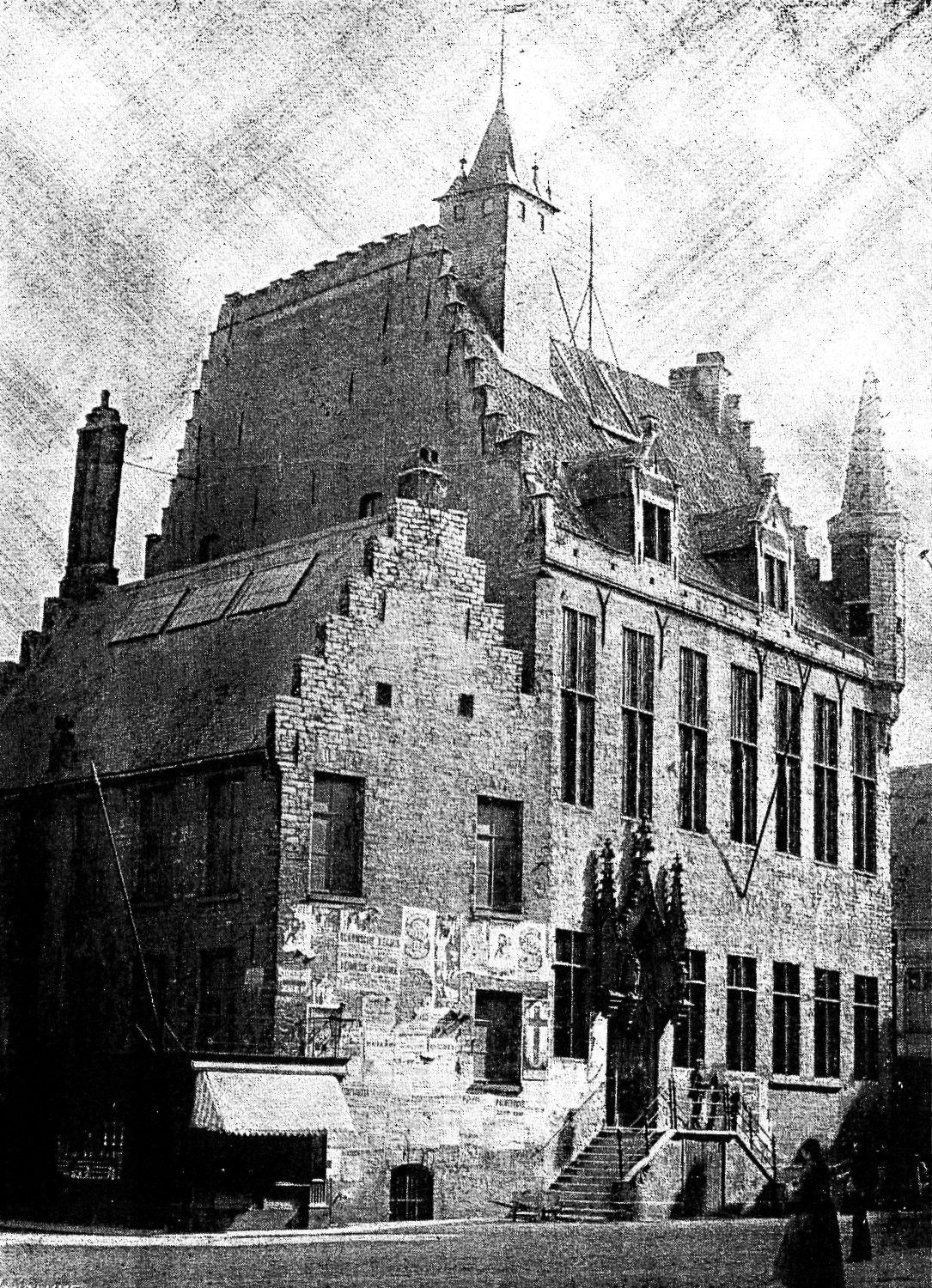
The Schepenhuis before 1902 (From: Ancienne maison échevinale ou vieux palais. Documents inédits, Mechelen, 1902)

The interior includes a remarkable archive room on the ground floor. Previously called Vierschaere, it has a remarkable oak ceiling. In the interior there are 12 sculpted balkzolen created between 1375 and 1378 by Herman Van Blankene and Jan van Lokeren. The original furnishings have been preserved only in the 1374 wing. There are cross bracings supported by corbels of carved stone made by Jan I Keldermans (Mansdale) between 1377 and 1385. The original fireplace and a stone landing staircase were removed in 1772. On the above floor there is a library that was formerly the meeting room of the aldermen. The chimney is by Andries Keldermans, with a mantelpiece made by Frans Sanders in 1526. On the north wall there is a 16th-century fresco depicting the Crucifixion. The stairway tower dates from 1407.

During the reign of Charles the Bold, the Parlement later known as Great Council of Mechelen was installed in the Schepenhuis in 1473. This was the highest court of law in the Netherlands. In 1477 it was abolished by Mary of Burgundy. Philip the Handsome decided to re-establish the Parlement, under the name Grote Raad van Mechelen. In 1616 the council moved to the former palace of Margaret of Austria, also in Mechelen.

=== Later functions ===
The building was later given various functions. For example, from 1811 to 1846 the city academy was housed here. From 1852 the building served as a municipal museum. On 1 November 1897 it was turned into a city archive and city library. The building was heavily damaged during the First World War. Several restoration campaigns followed, in 1916-1917, 1932 and 1934-1938. One side of the ground floor of the building had in the mean time also become one of the main post offices in the city, which is still being run by the national agency Bpost.

From 2000, the Schepenhuis served again as a museum. In 2011, an exhibition of works by Rik Wouters from the collection of the Royal Museum of Fine Arts opened, as the Antwerp museum was undergoing works of renovation. Until the end of these works in 2017, the Wouters collection remained in the Schepenhuis.

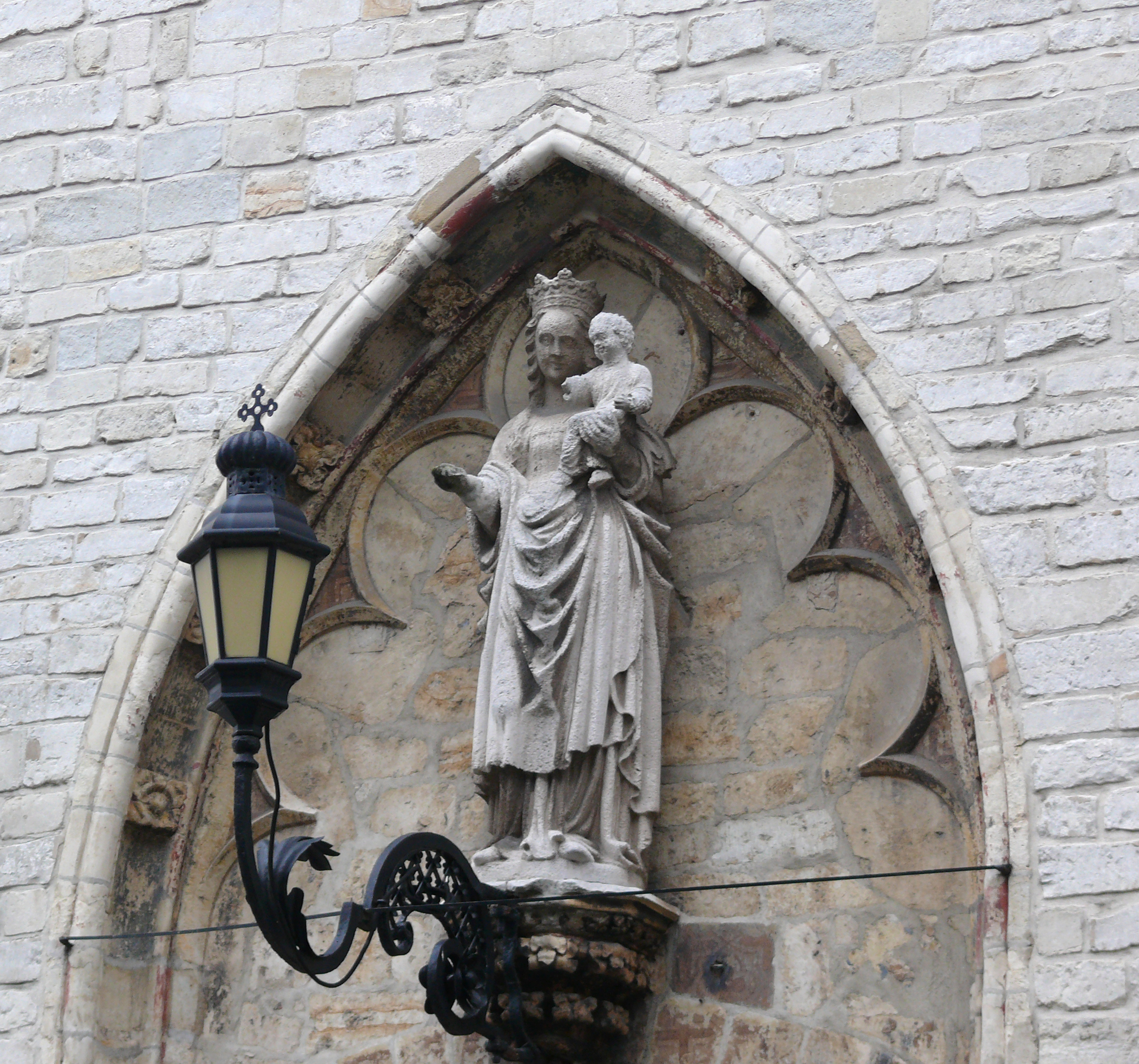
The stone statue of Our Lady is a 1933 replica of a 17th-century copy by Maarten van Calster after the original André Beauneveu statue from the 14th century.

Since 9 September 2018, the Schepenhuis is the new location of the tourist information office "Visit and UiT in Mechelen".
