= Igram van Achelen =

Dutch politician

President of the Great Council of Mechelen
- In office 1598–1604
- Preceded by: Jan van der Burch
- Succeeded by: Jacques Liebart, Lord of Sommaing

Personal details
- Born: 1528 's-Hertogenbosch, Duchy of Brabant, Seventeen Provinces
- Died: 18 October 1604 (aged 75–76); Mechelen, Habsburg Netherlands
- Profession: Politician; jurist

Igram van Achelen (1528 – 18 October 1604) was a Dutch statesman.

Van Achelen studied law in Deventer, Leiden and Leuven. In 1561 he married the niece of president Viglius van Aytta. In 1550 he was nominated member of the Frisian Regional Council by Charles V. In 1570 he became president of the Frisian State Council.

A memorial column from 1574 expresses the gratitude of the province for the construction of the dikes after the great floods of 1570. Later, when the Council announced a decree deseating Don John of Austria, he was suspected to take side for the latter. Van Achelen was incarcerated and released soon thereafter. He redeemed himself only eight years later, when he was awarded the knightly insignia. He became a member of the Privy Council of the Habsburg Netherlands, then on 18 August 1598 president of the Great Council of Mechelen.

Government offices
| Preceded by Jan van der Burch | 8th President of the Great Council; 1598–1604 | Succeeded by Jacques Liebart, Lord of Sommaing |

== Sources ==
- Allgemeine Deutsche Biographie - online version at Wikisource
