= Balthazar Ayala =

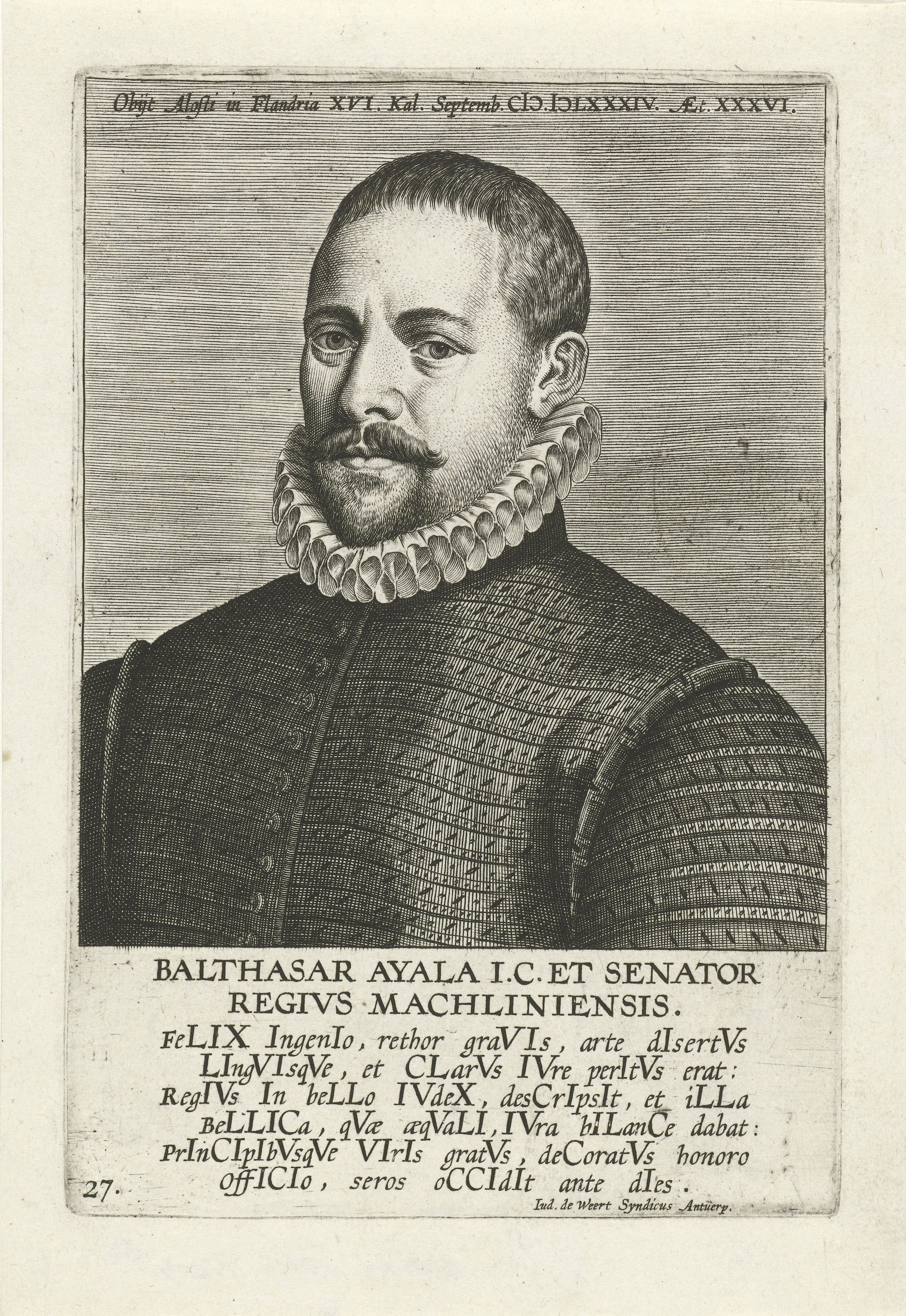
- Born: 1548
- Died: 1584 (aged 35–36)
- Occupation: Military judge

Balthazar Ayala (1548–1584) was a military judge in the Habsburg Netherlands during the opening decades of the Eighty Years' War who wrote an influential treatise on the law of war.

== Life ==
Ayala was born in Antwerp in 1548, the son of a Spanish cloth merchant, Gregorio Ayala, and his wife Agnes Rainalmia, a native of Cambrai. He studied at Leuven University, graduating licentiate of laws. On 27 May 1580 the Prince of Parma appointed him auditor general of the Army of Flanders.

On 20 January 1583, he was appointed master of requests in the Great Council of Mechelen, then sitting in Namur as a result of the unfolding Dutch Revolt. In 1584 he was royal commissioner for the renewal of the magistracy in Breda, Herentals and Lier. He died in Aalst on 1 September 1584, probably while acting in the same capacity there.

Of his five brothers, Grégoire was also military auditor and later a member of the Council of Brabant, and Philippe was entrusted with an embassy to Henri IV of France.

== Works ==
- De jure et officiis bellicis et disciplina militari (Douai, Jan Bogard, 1582). Second edition, Antwerp, 1597.
  - English translation published in 1912 in the Carnegie Institution Classics of International Law series.
