= Council of Flanders =

Former court of law in early modern Netherlands

The Council of Flanders (Dutch: Raad van Vlaanderen, French: Conseil de Flandres), primarily sitting in the Gravensteen in Ghent from 1407, was a court of law operating under the authority of the Count of Flanders and exercising jurisdiction throughout the County of Flanders.

== History ==
The council grew from less formalised exercises of jurisdiction by the count of Flanders and his advisers, with no clear date of origin. Philip the Bold attempted to found a permanent court with codified rules and jurisdiction at Lille, at the same time as establishing the Lille Chamber of Accounts to audit government expenditure. However, the cities Ghent, Bruges and Ypres, and the Franc of Bruges, refused to recognise the council as having appellate jurisdiction over their own magistrates. In 1407 the council was relocated to Ghent, and on 17 August 1409 Duke John the Fearless issued the council's statutes in 44 articles. Article 26 specified that in closed hearings the council was to use French, and in open hearings the choice of language was to be left to the parties.

During the 15th century when the city of Ghent was at odds with the Duke of Burgundy, the council often sat elsewhere – at various times in Kortrijk, Dendermonde, Ypres or Bruges. It was finally re-established to Ghent in 1498. The counts of Flanders had recognised the appellate jurisdiction of the Parlement of Paris for suits arising in those parts of Flanders anciently attached to the kingdom of France (essentially those parts west of the river Scheldt), but in 1521 Charles V decreed that the Great Council of Mechelen had sole appellate jurisdiction for the whole county of Flanders. By the Treaty of Cambrai (1529), Francis I of France renounced all claim to sovereignty or jurisdiction in Flanders.

During the Dutch Revolt, Calvinists seized power in Ghent in 1578. The council was reconstituted at Douai in 1580, under the presidency of Willem van Pamele, and remained there until 1585.

In 1694 Charles II of Spain disbanded the Admiralty Council and transferred maritime jurisdiction to the Council of Flanders.

The last sentence of death issued by the Council of Flanders was on 24 July 1772.

The council ceased to exist in 1795, when the Austrian Netherlands were annexed by the French First Republic.

=== Presidents of the Council of Flanders ===
- Pieter van der Zijpe (1386–1404)
- Pieter van Camdonck (1404–1409)
- Simon van Formelis (1409–1440)
- Goswin de Wilde (1440–1445)
- Gillis van der Woestyne (1451-)
- Andries Colin (1465–1479)
- Thomas de Plaine, acting (1475–1477)
- Paul de Baenst (1479–1497)
- Filips Wielant, acting (1488–1492)
- Jean le Sauvage (1497–1509)
- Richard Rogier
- Nicolaas Utenhove (−1527)
- Pieter Tayspil (−1540)
- Lodewijk Helleweghe (1541–1556)
- Adriaan vander Burgh
- Jacob de Blasere (−1558)
- Jacob Martens (−1573)
- Adolf van Meetkercke, in revolt against Spain (1580–1585)
- Willem van Pamele (1580–1585), loyal to Spain
- Nicholas Damant (1585), refused
- Jacob Bogaert (1587–1596)
- Jacques Liebart (1598–1605)
- Willem van Corenhuyse (1605–1617)
- Marcus de Hertoghe (1617–1626)
- Guilielmus Wyts (1626–1641)
- Aurelius Augustinus van Male (refused)
- Filip Willem van Steenhuys (1649–1650)
- Jean-Baptiste della Faille (1650–1666)
- Lodewijk Errembault (1668–1679), loyal to France
- Antoon vander Piet (1679–1706), loyal to Spain
- Antoon Sersanders de Luna (1706–1721)
- François-Aloyse vander Meersch (1722–1739)
- Frederik Varendoncq (1739–1740)
- Karel-Filip Patijn (1742–1772)
- Louis de Keerle (1772–1781)
- Jan Diericx (from 1782)

== See also ==
- Council of Brabant
- Council of Luxembourg
- Council of Troubles
- Great Council of Mechelen
