= USS Carondelet (IX-136) =

History

United States
- Name: USS Carondelet
- Builder: Società Escercizio Bacini, Riva Trigossa, Italy
- Launched: 1921
- Acquired: 24 February 1944
- Commissioned: 4 April 1944
- Decommissioned: 25 February 1946
- Stricken: 25 February 1946
- Fate: Returned to the War Shipping Administration, 25 February 1946, stricken 1954

General characteristics
- Type: Mobile Floating Storage Tanker
- Displacement: 4,500 long tons (4,572 t)
- Length: 343 ft (105 m)
- Beam: 59 ft 4 in (18.08 m)
- Draft: 25 ft 10 in (7.87 m)
- Speed: 10 knots (19 km/h; 12 mph)
- Complement: 152
- Armament: 1 × 5-inch 38 caliber dual purpose gun; 8 × 20 mm guns

USS Carondelet (IX-136) was a tanker and served in the United States Navy during World War II.

The second Carondelet was built in 1921 by Società Esercizio Bacini, Riva Trigossa, Italy, as Brennero (later renamed Gold Heels); transferred from the War Shipping Administration on 24 February 1944; and commissioned on 4 April 1944.

== Service history ==
Carondelet spent her entire wartime service as a station tanker in the Southwest Pacific and Philippines. The ship was occasionally refueled by larger tankers that pulled up to her side. She lay at Milne Bay, New Guinea, until 26 November 1944; at Leyte from December 1944 to 25 May 1945; and at Subic Bay, Luzon, from 28 May to 12 September 1945. Pouring her precious fuel into the bunkers of the ships which pressed the war home to the Japanese, she rendered essential service. She returned to Mobile, Alabama, on 22 January 1946, and was decommissioned and returned to the War Shipping Administration on 25 February 1946.
