= Great Council of Mechelen =

Supreme court in the Burgundian Netherlands

Great Council
- Grote Raad / Grand Conseil / Grosse Rat
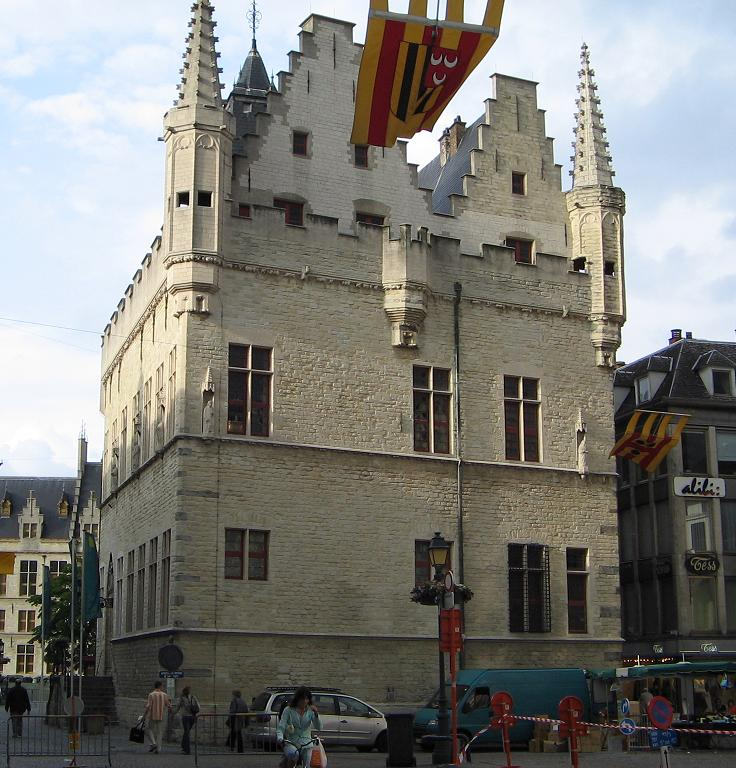
- The Schepenhuis in Mechelen, seat of the Great Council 1473–1477 and 1504–1609
- Established: 1473
- Dissolved: 1794
- Location: Mechelen

President

From the 15th century onwards, the Great Council of the Netherlands at Mechelen (Dutch: De Grote Raad der Nederlanden te Mechelen; French: le grand conseil des Pays-Bas à Malines; German: der Grosse Rat der Niederlände zu Mecheln) was the highest court in the Burgundian Netherlands. It was responsible for the Dutch-, French- and German-speaking areas. In Luxembourgish the phrase "mir ginn op Mechelen" (we'll go to Mechelen) still means playing one's last trump card. The Grote Raad first sat in the Schepenhuis in Mechelen then, from 1616, in the (old) palace of Margaretha of Austria on Keizerstraat.

== Origins and history ==
Medieval European rulers were assisted by advisers, who in many cases formed a specialised subset of the ruler's court. Together with the ruler, they formed the Council of State, also called the consilium or curia. Gradually such councils became more specialised, with separate financial, judicial and political councils emerging over decades and centuries.

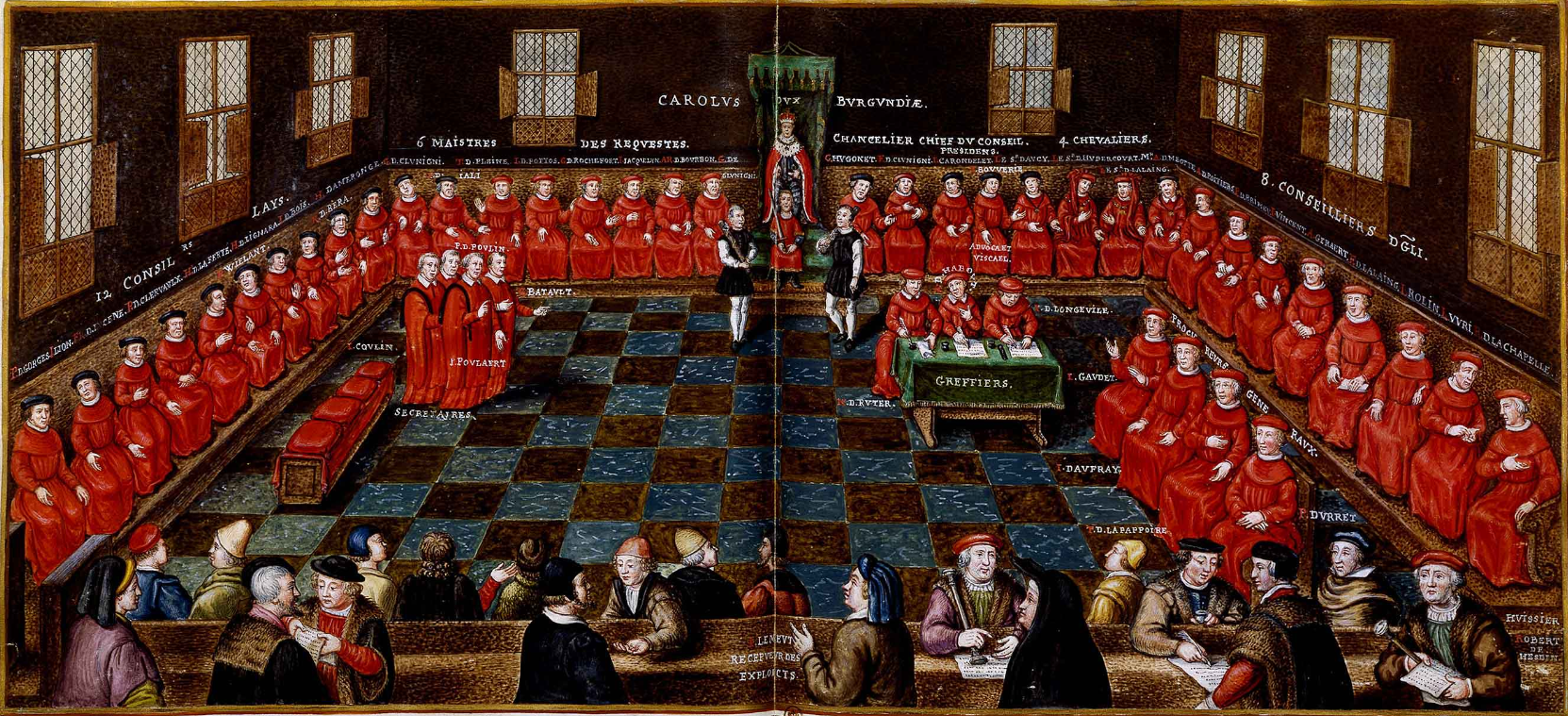
Session of the Parliament of Mechelen presided over by Charles the Bold. 17th century drawing after a 15th-century original

In the Burgundian Netherlands, the councils initially travelled with the Duke. In 1473 Duke Charles the Bold decided to establish his council in a specific location, in Mechelen. The council took on the name of the Parliament of Mechelen. After Charles' death in 1477, this parliament was abolished by Charles' daughter Mary of Burgundy on the occasion of the issuing of the Great Privilege. This was the result of the constant struggle between the centralisation of the rulers and the particularism of the states. The French king was also against a parliament in Mechelen, as it would become a rival of the Parlement of Paris. Nonetheless, under Philip the Handsome, the Great Council was again established in Mechelen in 1504, this time permanently, but without the addition of parliament to its name.

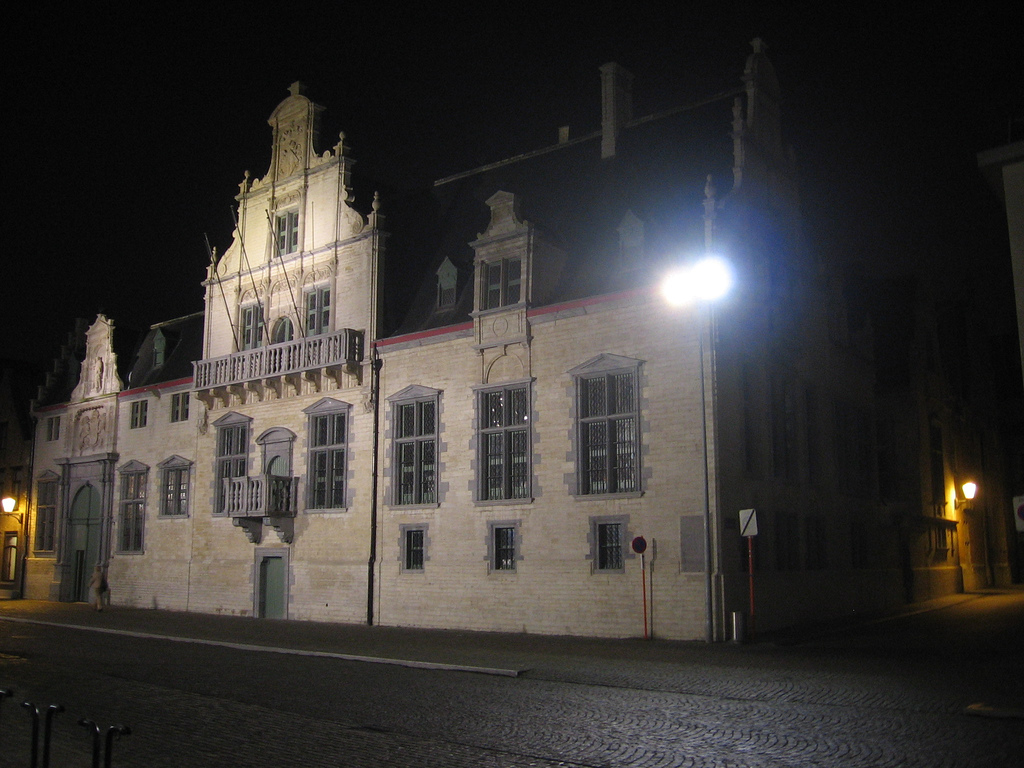
The Hof van Savoye in Mechelen, seat of the Great Council between 1609 and 1792

In the 16th century the territorial powers of the Great council grew. Through the establishment of authority by Charles V, Holy Roman Emperor over Tournai, Utrecht, Friesland, Overijssel and Guelders, the council's territory now included all of the Seventeen Provinces.

In 1526 the construction of a new Seat for the Great Council started by the architect and Master Mason Rombout II Keldermans. This Brabantine Gothic project was abandoned in 1547 —with little more than the ground floor built. The council was losing power and influence. After the Eighty Years' War, the Dutch Republic became independent. In the Northern Netherlands, the judicial power was taken over by the provincial council and the Supreme court of Holland, Zeeland and West-Friesland (1582). The Great Council of Mechelen remained active in the remaining Southern Netherlands, of which France annexed the southern province of Artois and parts of Flanders, Hainaut and Luxembourg. A number of provincial councils declared themselves independent from the Great Council: in the beginning of the 16th century the councils of Brabant and Hainaut did this, and in the late 18th century (1782) the judicial councils of Luxembourg and Tournai as well. This left the Great Council only Flanders, Mechelen, Namur and Upper Guelders.

The Great Council was abolished during the French Revolution. During the first French invasion in 1792, the Council moved to Roermond, where it watched over the last unoccupied lands, the twelve remaining municipalities of Austrian Guelders. During the second French invasion in 1794, part of the council members moved to Regensburg and Augsburg, in imperial territory; another part chose for the new regime and became part of the new judicial organisation.

== Composition ==
The composition of the Great Council was noticeably stable throughout the centuries. It had one chairman or president, 15 to 16 councillors, one procureur-general, one replacement procureur-general, one fiscal advocate, 10 paid secretaries, two or three clerks, advocates and lastly Huissier de justice. Of the councillors, who wore red vestments, traditionally four were clerical, later lessened to two. All councillors were appointed by the ruler from a list of candidates of the Council itself. They had to be licentiate or doctor in law at one of the universities in the ruler's lands.

The following people were council members:

=== Presidents ===
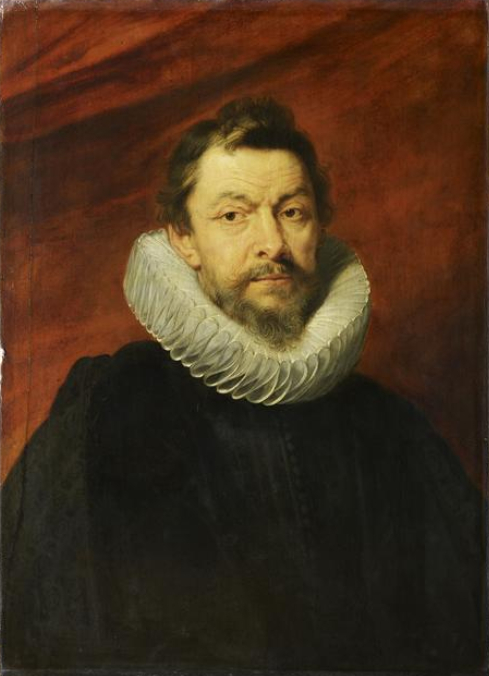
Henri IV de Vicq, 12th President. By Rubens, Louvre.

The president was appointed for life by the monarch. Normally noble lords were chosen, they had the right to change their coats of arms with heraldic maces.

The President was the direct contact between the Council and the Emperor, he had great influence and played often a major part in local history or even beyond. Many Presidents had a great international network that allowed them to enlarge their social status.

| Nr | Start | End | Name |
|---|---|---|---|
| 1. | 1503 | 1521 | Joannes Peeters, Lord of Catz |
| 2. | 1521 | 1528 | Judocus Lauwerys |
| 3. | 1528 | 1532 | Nicolaas Everaerts |
| 4. | 1532 | 1556 | Lambert de Briarde, Lord of Liezele |
| 5. | 1556 | 1562 | Nicolas II Everaerts |
| 6. | 1562 | 1584 | Jean de Glymes, Lord of Waterdijk |
| 7. | 1584 | 1595 | Jan van der Burch |
| 8. | 1598 | 1604 | Igram van Achelen |
| 9. | 1605 | 1622 | Jacques Libaert, Lord of Sommaing |
| 10. | 1622 | 1628 | Ranunce of France, Lord of Noyelles |
| 11. | 1628 | 1637 | Zeger Coulez |
| 12. | 1637 | 1651 | Henri de Vicq, Lord of Meuleveldt |
| 13. | 1651 | 1661 | Antoine l'Hermite |
| 14. | 1661 | 1669 | Adrien of France, Lord of Noyelles |
| 15. | 1669 | 1686 | Jean-Antoine Locquet, 1st Viscount of Hombeke |
| 16. | 1686 | 1690 | Andre del Marmol |
| 17. | 1690 | 1690 | Guillaume-Philippe, Marquess of Herzelles |
| 18. | 1690 | 1699 | Guillaume-Albert de Grysperre, Baron of Goyck |
| 19. | 1699 | 1707 | Hyacinthe-Marie de Brouchoven |
| 20. | 1707 | 1714 | Jacques Jean Baptiste Stalins, Lord of Poppenrode |
| 21. | 1716 | 1725 | Christophe-Ernest, 1st Count of Baillet |
| 20. | 1726 | 1738 | Pierre-Primitive van Volden |
| 21. | 1739 | 1756 | Eugène Joseph d'Olmen, Baron de Poederlé |
| 22. | 1756 | 1773 | Guillaume-Ignace Pycke, Lord of Ideghem |
| 23. | 1773 | 1794 | Goswin de Fierlant |

=== Others ===
- Balthazar Ayala, master of requests 1583–1584
- Jan I Carondelet
- Jan II Carondelet
- Jeroen van Busleyden
- Jean Alphonse, 1st Count de Coloma
- Viglius
- Filips Wielant, councillor 1473–1477, 1504–1520
- Christinaeus, Or Paul van Christynen.
- Jean Thadee de Grouff
- Jean Joseph de Vreven
- Corneel Janssens Hujoel
- Claude Ignace de Febure
- François-Augustin de Steenhault, Lord of Nieuwenhove
- François Alexander de Steenhault.
- Gilles-Augustin de Steenhault, Lord of Felignies.(1740-1758)
- Remy du Laury: Procurator-General in 1716.
- Jean Ferdinand Keyaerts: Procurator-General in 1716.
- Jean Guillaume de Potter: Advocate-Fiscal until 1742.
- Jean-Jacques van Caestre, Baron of Boutershem.
- Jean Baptiste van Slabbeeck: Advocate-Fiscal in 1744.
- Henri Joseph de Villers: Advocate-Fiscal in 1767.
- Claude Sotteau : Procurator-General in 1742.
- Albert-Philippe de Vaernewyck
- Jean Philippe de Wapenaert, Lord of Erpe : Procurator-General in 1750.
- Charles-Philippe de Wapenaert.
- Charles Thomas Caimo.
- Charles-Henri Goubau, Lord of Middelswalle.
- Melchior Goubau d'Hovorst, son of Charles.
- Henri Theodore Jacobs: Procurator-General in 1761.
- Ignace-Joseph Wirix, Lord of Kessel: Afvocate-Fiscal in 1771.
- Joseph Wiro de Bors.
- Jacques Joseph de Stassart.
- Daniel Servaes.
- Guillaume-François Snoy
- Jean Louis Pouppez
- Gaspard Antoine de Meester
- Guillaume de Ruysschen, Lord of Heylissem.
- Philippe-Antoine de Beeckman, Lord of Schore.
- Gerard Norbert de Robiano.
- Gaspard François du Trieu
- Jean-Joseph du Trieu
- Joseph-Theodeore de Richterich,
- Jean-Théodore de Richterich.
- Pierre Andre François du Trieu, Greffier.
- Alard de Saint-Vaast.
- Pierre Claude de Saint-Vaast, Lord of Denterghem.
- Augustin Ignace de Saint-Vaast, Lord of Denterghem
- Jean-François de Villegas, Baron of Hovorst.
- Pierre van Volden.
- Corneille Nelis.
- Nicolas-Joseph de Posson
- Henri-Joseph, Count de Villers
- Jacques-Joseph de Stassart.
- Juste-Cécile van Putte
- Gilles Stalens, Lord of Tendaele.
- Philippe du Jardin
- Guillaume-François van Kieldonck, Lord of Heynsbroeck
- Alexander Boulin.

Impressive buildings built by the councillors include:

- Hof van Busleyden
- Hof van Palermo
- Hof van Prant

== Role ==
The competence of the Great Council strongly fluctuated from period to period and from province to province. In the small lordship of Mechelen, it controlled practically all legislative and executive power. It was also the court, for both initial charges and appeals for persons and institutions that fell under royal protection. Members of the court, knights of the Order of the Golden Fleece, and everyone who was privileged through title or function could only be judged before the Great Council. For the rest the Council functioned as a court of appeal and a court of cassation over all sentences made by provincial justice councils and other, lower, courts in the Seventeen Provinces (or what remained of it later on). The Great Council also treated issues of privileges, mandates, letters of commendation, letters of marque, donations of functions and goods, gifts and other taxes, confiscation of property, jurisdiction conflicts between separate government institutions, and also border conflicts. Appeals against judicial rulings were also handled, but generally only against serious cases. On the other hand, family rights and inheritance usually fell under the jurisdiction of the church courts.

Archives of the Great Council of Mechelen can be found in the National and Provincial State Archives in Brussels and the Archives Départementales du Nord in Lille. Because it held jurisdiction over large areas and widely ranging subjects during its three centuries of existence, the Great Council takes an important place in the Legal history of the Netherlands and Belgium.

== Records ==
A calendar of the memorials of the Great Council edited by Arthur Gaillard has been published in two volumes under the title Inventaire des mémoriaux du Grand Conseil de Malines (Brussels, P. Weissenbruch, 1900–1903).

== See also ==
- Council of Troubles
- Privy Council of the Habsburg Netherlands
- supreme council in Vienna
