= SS Carondelet =

General characteristics
- Tons burthen: 1508 27/100 tons

SS Carondelet was an immigrant ship, active in 1877 and 1878, that transported immigrants from Havana to New York City. The Immigrant Ships Transcribers Guild has records of three of its voyages, in which its weight is reported as "15118.29 tons", "1508 27/100 tons", and "1508 tons".
