= Jean de Glymes, Lord of Waterdijk =

Jean de Glymes de Berghes or Jan van Bergen (died 1583), Lord of Waterdijk, was an officeholder in the Habsburg Netherlands.

Jean was the son of Dismas de Glymes, one of the thirty-six recognised bastards of John III of Glymes, lord of Bergen op Zoom. After graduating in canon and civil law, he became an alderman of Bergen op Zoom, serving as mayor in 1545. From 1543 to 1554 he was a member of the council of John IV of Glymes, Marquis of Bergen; he was also appointed to the Court of Holland and, in 1548, to the Great Council of Mechelen (the highest court of appeal in the Habsburg Netherlands). He became president of the Great Council in 1562.

Glymes married Catherine Wyts (1523–1560), daughter of Josse Wyts and Catherine Vilain, and together they had four children: Jean, Dismas, Jacqueline and Marie. His brother, Maximilian de Berghes, became the first archbishop of Cambrai, while their sister, Cécile, married Louis Vilain, another member of the Great Council.

After the Calvinist seizure of power in Mechelen in 1580, the Great Council was reconstituted in Namur, where Glymes died on 24 August 1583.

Government offices
Preceded by Nicolas Everaerts	President of the Great Council; 1562–1583	Succeeded by Jan van der Burch
