= Jean Carondelet =

Burgundian cleric, politician and jurist

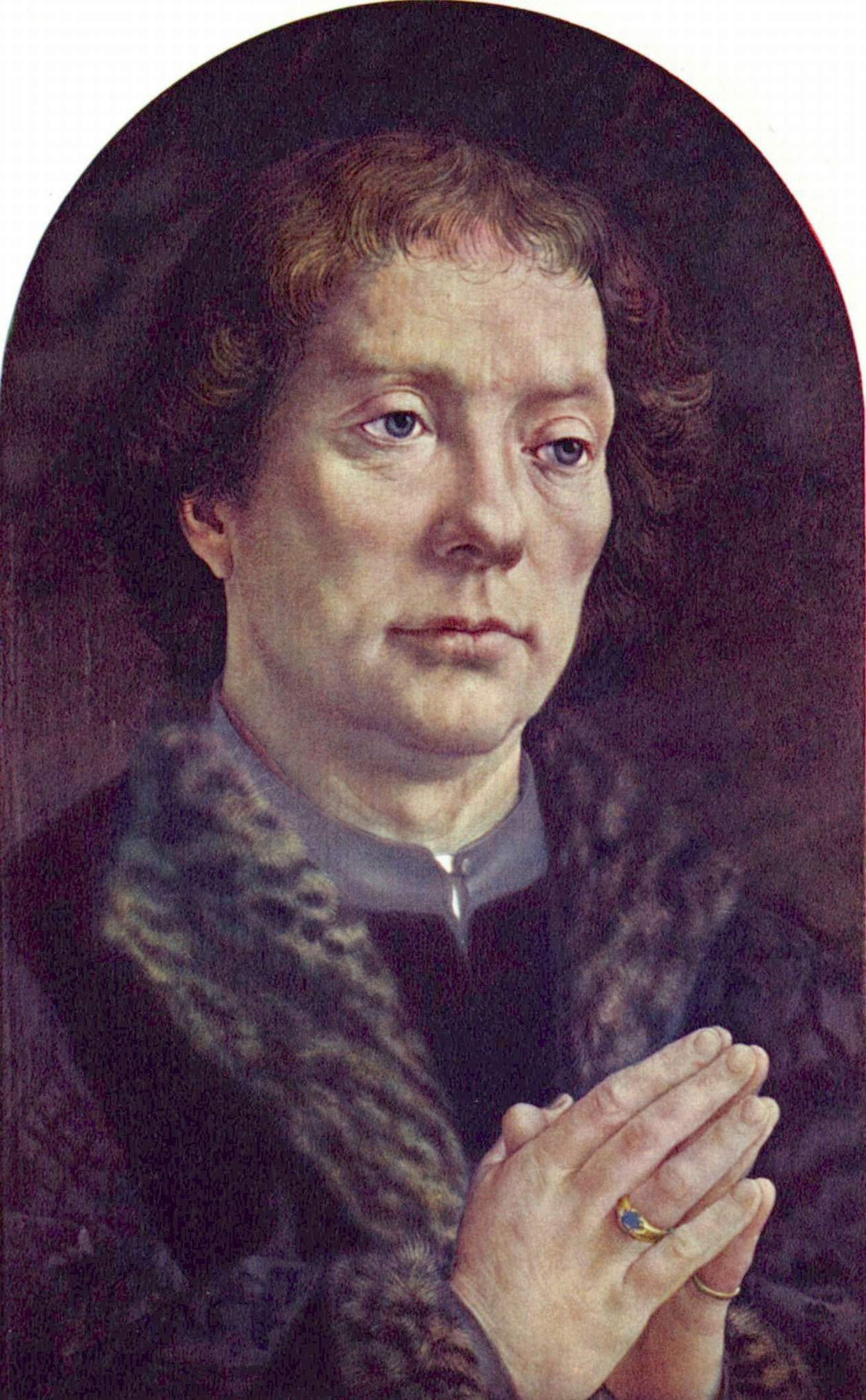
Jan Gossaert - Jan II Carondelet, Louvre, Paris

Jean II Carondelet (1469, Dôle – 7 February 1545, Mechelen) was a Burgundian Catholic cleric, politician, jurist and one of the most important advisors to Charles V, Holy Roman Emperor. He was a patron of the Dutch philosopher Erasmus and a brother of the Habsburg diplomat Ferry Carondelet.

== Life ==
The second son of jurist Jan I Carondelet, he studied Canon Law and Roman Law in his city of birth. He had a brother named Claude I Carondelet and a nephew named Claude II Carondelet. He entered a religious life in 1493, starting his renowned career as dean of the University of Franche-Comté in Besançon. In 1497 he became councillor of the Great Duchal Council of Philip the Fair. In 1504 he became clerical councillor of the newly created Great Council of Mechelen. Finally in 1508 he was made member of the Privy Council of the Habsburg Netherlands, the highest government institution of the Burgundian Netherlands.

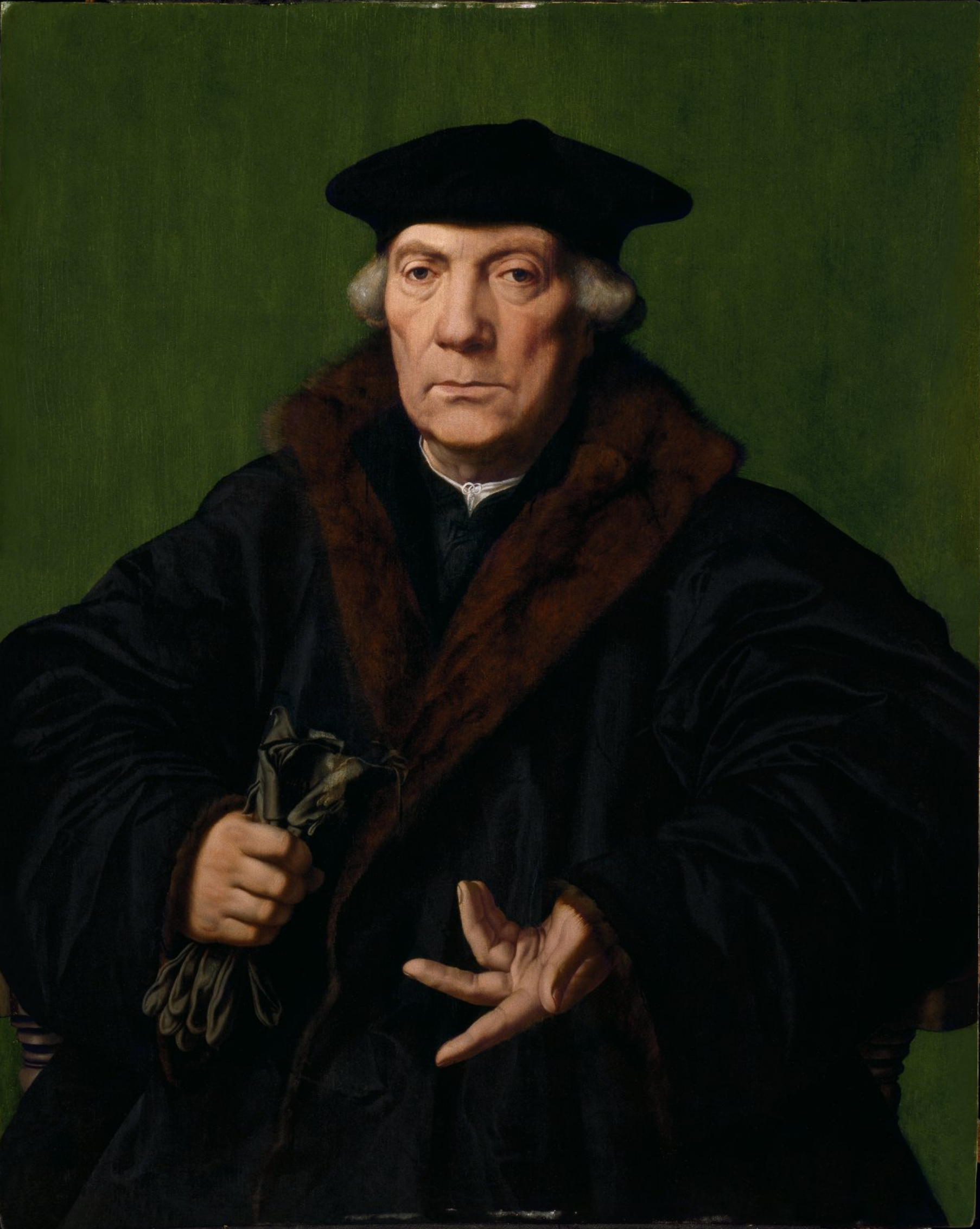
Jan Cornelisz. Vermeyen (Dutch, 1500-1559). Portrait of Jean de Carondelet, ca. 1530. Oil on panel. Brooklyn Museum

Prince Charles's mother, Juana of Castile was declared insane and deposed by Charles, and his aunt Archduchess Margaret of Austria, the regent of the Burgundian Netherlands, was his guardian. Prince Charles became acquainted with Jean Carondelet through his brother Ferry, who was the confessor to Margaret of Austria. Jean Carondelet soon became a close advisor to Prince Charles, and in 1517-1519, after Charles had assumed the Spanish throne, Jean Carondelet accompanied him to Spain as a member of his privy council.

In 1522 Charles named him chairman of the Privy Council. In this function he formed, together with Archduchess Margaret of Austria, the center of Burgundian control over the Low Countries. After the death of the regent in 1530, Jean, together with Antoine I de Lalaing led the government of the Burgundian Netherlands until Mary of Austria was appointed as the next regent. When Charles V put through thorough reforms of the governmental institutions in 1531 (such as the creation of the so-called Collateral Councils), Carondelet managed to retain his position: he remained president of the Privy Council and became chairman of the Council of State in Brussels. Until his resignation in 1540, he remained a central figure in the government of the Burgundian Netherlands.

== Numerous profitable functions ==
Through the influence of the landlords, Carondelet was able to rise in the church hierarchy without much effort. In 1519 he was named archbishop of Palermo, which also included the primacy of Sicily, a function he kept until his death. The fact that he never visited the archbishopric, and never put a foot on Sicilian soil, did not prevent him from receiving the numerous revenues connected to the bishopric.

In 1520 he became provost in the St. Donatian's Cathedral in Bruges, one of the richest benefices of the church in the Low Countries. Other functions he filled included provost of Sint-Walburgis in Veurne and provost of Sint-Piatus in Seclin, as well as canon of the Sint-Guidochurch in Anderlecht; and he succeeded his brother Ferry Carondelet as abbot of Montbenoît. The cumulation of all these functions brought him a large income. He erected a large building, the Hof van Palermo, in the Zakstreet in Mechelen, where he died in 1545.

Carondelet's wealth and influences enabled him to build up an extensive patronage. He was very generous to his friends, among whom was Erasmus. Painters including Jan van Scorel, Bernard van Orley and Jan Gossaert received commissions from him. His region of birth, Franche-Comté, also profited from his generosity, specifically the cathedral of Besançon and the collegiate church of Dôle.

== Tomb ==
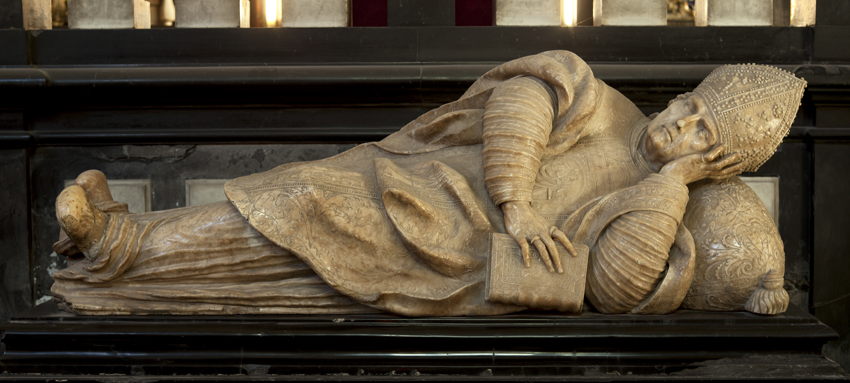
Tomb of Jean Cardondelet in the St. Salvator's Cathedral.

Carondelet was buried in St. Donatian's Cathedral in Bruges under an impressive monument, part of which is still extant, and can be seen in St. Salvator's Cathedral.

== Works ==
- Consilia et observationes juris
- De orbis situ, Antwerpen, 1562 (This pamphlet published by Carondelet was composed by Franciscus Monachus and accompanied a globe made by the latter for the former.)

== Literature ==
- L. P. GACHARD, Jean Carondelet, in: Biographie nationale de Belgique, Tome III, 1872, col. 348-350.
- Erasmus, Desiderius (1979) The Correspondence of Erasmus Vol. 5 Letters 594-841 University of Toronto Press, Toronto, Canada, ISBN 0-8020-1981-1, p. 353.
