= Ferry Carondelet =

Habsburg diplomat, advisor, and abbot (1473–1528)

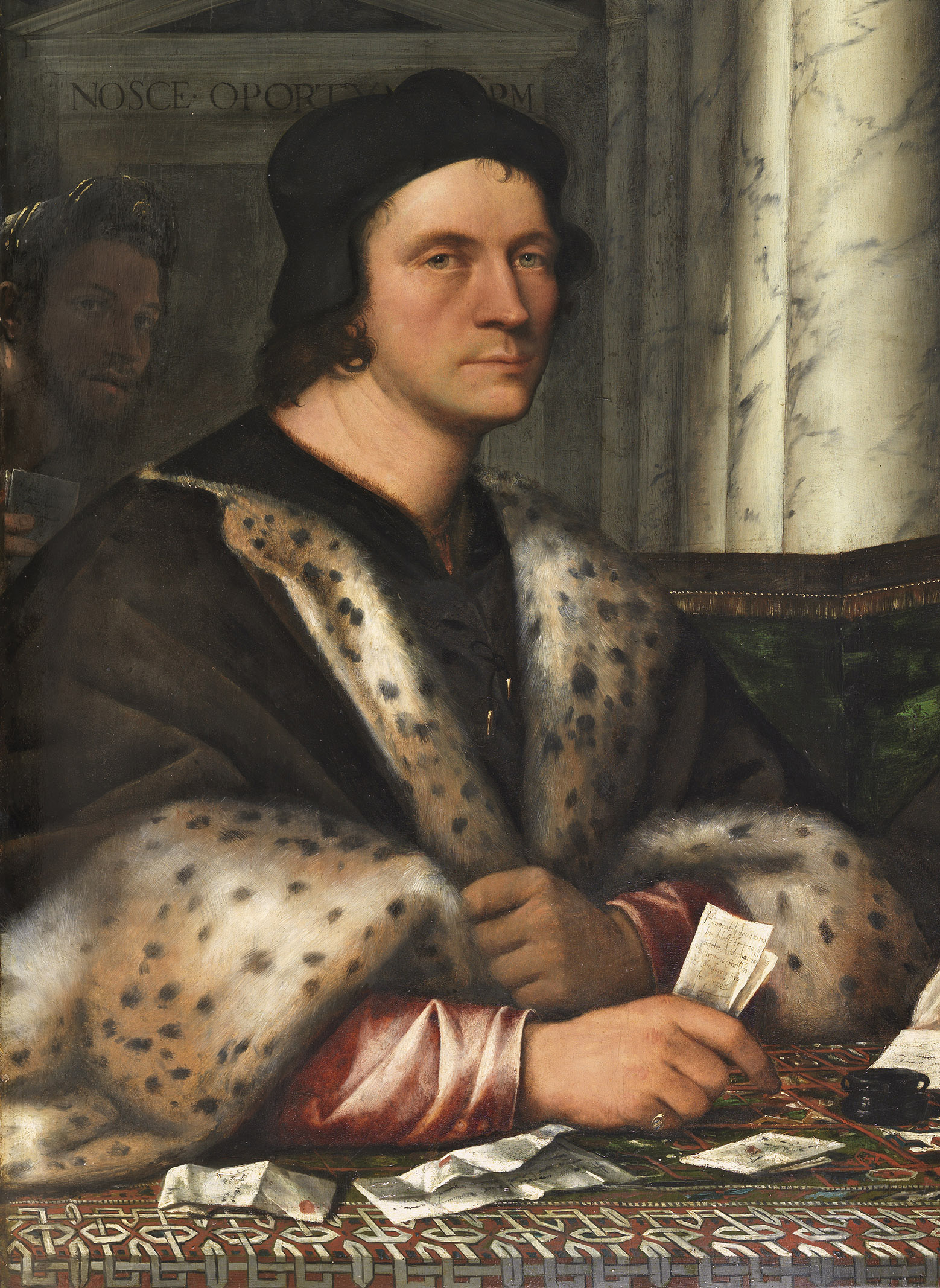
Ferry Carondelet in Italy c. 1510–1512. Portrait by Sebastiano del Piombo (Madrid, Thyssen-Bornemisza Museum).

Ferry Carondelet (also Ferricus Carondelet) (1473 – 27 June 1528) was a Habsburg diplomat, advisor to Margaret of Austria and abbot at Montbenoît. He was the younger brother of Jean Carondelet.

== Biography ==
Ferry Carondelet was born in Mechelen, Flanders, to a rich, bourgeois and influential family originally from Dole. He grew up in Burgundy, at the time a Habsburg province under Emperor Maximilian I, and matriculated at the University of Franche-Comté, where he took clerical orders. In 1504, he was named Archdeacon of the Besançon church.

In 1508 Ferry Carondelet became confessor (church advisor) to Margaret of Austria, the regent of the Spanish Netherlands, and incidentally to her ward, the future Holy Roman Emperor, Charles V. In 1510, he was made Papal Legate to the court of Emperor Maximilian. In 1515, he returned to Burgundy and became the abbot of the abbey in Montbenoît.

Ferry Carondelet is known as a major benefactor of the Montbenoît abbey and the cathedral in Besançon. He commissioned the Italian painter Fra Bartolomeo to create the Carondelet Altar for Besançon, and he completely rebuilt the church for the Montbenoît abbey. He died on 27 June 1528 and is buried in a marble tomb in the Cathédrale Saint Jean in Besançon.
