= Master of Requests =

European law office

Master of Requests, from the Latin Requestarum Magister, is an office that developed in several European systems of law and government in the late Middle Ages and the early modern period. Holders of the title had the responsibility of presenting petitions, requests and appeals for clemency to a higher court of law, a royal council, or directly to a monarch or other ruler. In origin they were not clearly separate from royal secretaries, carrying out the presentation of petitions as part of the administration of the royal household but gaining influence through their ability to provide access to the ruler. In several jurisdictions they came to have an important legal role as assessors or arbiters of requests, attached to specific executive or judicial bodies, and in France even exercised royal oversight over the law courts. Although the title is now largely historical, in France there is still a body of maîtres des requêtes responsible for preparing cases for trial in the highest administrative court, the Conseil d'État.

Specific offices include the following:

- Master of Requests (England), judges that succeeded the medieval Lord Privy Seal presiding over the Renaissance Court of Requests
- Master of Requests (France), mid-ranking office holder of the Conseil d'Etat
- Master of Requests (Scotland), advisory position to the executive until 1592; sifted petitions referred to the Privy Council of Scotland.

== See also ==
- List of Masters of Requests of England and Scotland (a chronological list of English and Scottish Masters of Requests)
