= Coloma =

Coloma may refer to:

== People ==
- Noble Spanish House of Coloma:
  - Carlos Coloma de Saa, 1st Marquess of Espinar
  - Alfonso Coloma, bishop of Barcelona
  - Emmanuel Coloma y Escolana
  - Jean Alphonse, 1st Count de Coloma
  - Francisco Coloma y Maceda
  - Juan II Coloma, 1st Lord of Elda
  - Juan IV Coloma y Cardona, 1st Count of Elda
  - Pedro Coloma, Baron of Bornhem
  - Pierre Coloma, Viscount of Dourlens
- Carlos Coloma Nicolás
- Diana Coloma, Ecuadorian politician
- Eugenie Santa Coloma Sourget, French composer, pianist and singer
- Luis Coloma
- Meredith Coloma, Canadian musician and luthier

== Places ==
=== United States ===
- Coloma, California
- Coloma, Indiana
- Coloma, Michigan
- Coloma, Missouri
- Coloma, Wisconsin
- Coloma (town), Wisconsin
- Coloma Township, Whiteside County, Illinois
- Coloma Charter Township, Michigan

=== Elsewhere ===
- La Coloma, Cuba
- Santa Coloma, Asturias, Spain
- Santa Coloma d'Andorra
- Coloma Park, Sint-Pieters-Leeuw, Belgium

== Other uses ==
- Coloma (barquentine), a sailing ship; see Minnie Patterson

== See also ==
- Coloman
- Koloma (disambiguation)
