= Mariekerke, Belgium =

Coordinates: 51°03′49″N 4°11′32″E

Mariekerke
- Village
- Mariekerke
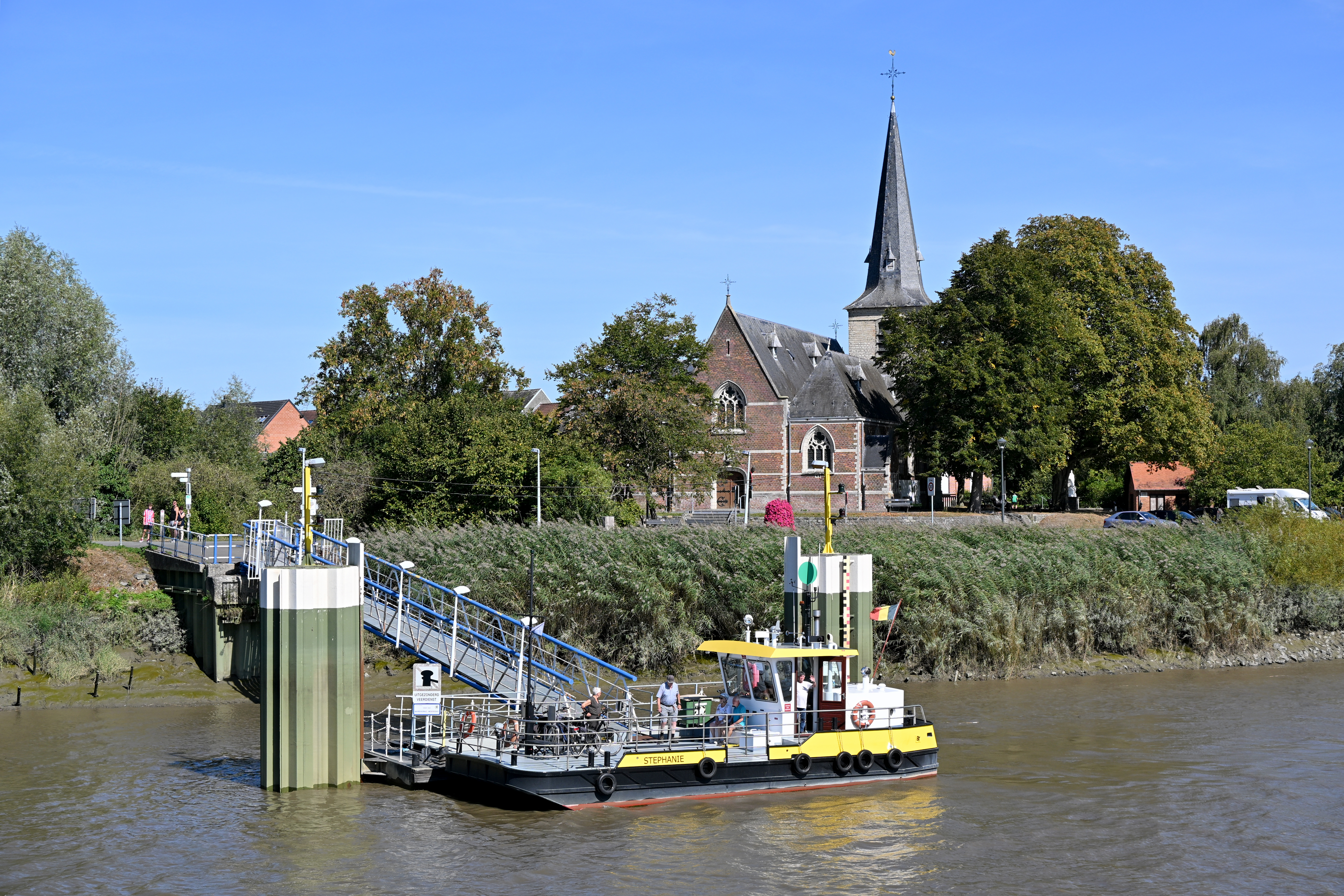
- Mariekerke seen from the river Scheldt.

- Coat of arms
- Interactive map of Mariekerke

Area
  - Total: 2.25 km^{2} (0.87 sq mi)

Population
  - Total: 2,440

Mariekerke is a village in the municipality of Bornem, in the province of Antwerp, Belgium. It is located on the banks of the river Scheldt. In January 2025, Mariekerke had a population of 2,440 inhabitants.

== History ==
In the early Middle Ages the village of Mariekerke was part of the Baceroth-estate that also included present-day Baasrode, Sint-Amands and Vlassenbroek. The parish of Mariekerke originally resided under the authority of the Land van Dendermonde, but in the 10th century it was added to the Land van Bornem.

The first mention of a church in Mariekerke dates tot the year 1212. In 1632, after it had been destroyed by fire, the church was rebuilt by Jeanne L'Escuyer, widow to Pedro Coloma, lord of Bornem.

In 1914, at the beginning of the First World War, the church was almost completely destroyed. In 1925 the church was rebuilt in the Neo-classical style.

== Notable people ==
- Jan Hammenecker (1878–1932), priest and writer. Next to the church there is a monument dedicated to Hammenecker.
