= Philips of Marnix, Lord of Saint-Aldegonde =

16th century mayor of Antwerp, probable author of Dutch national anthem

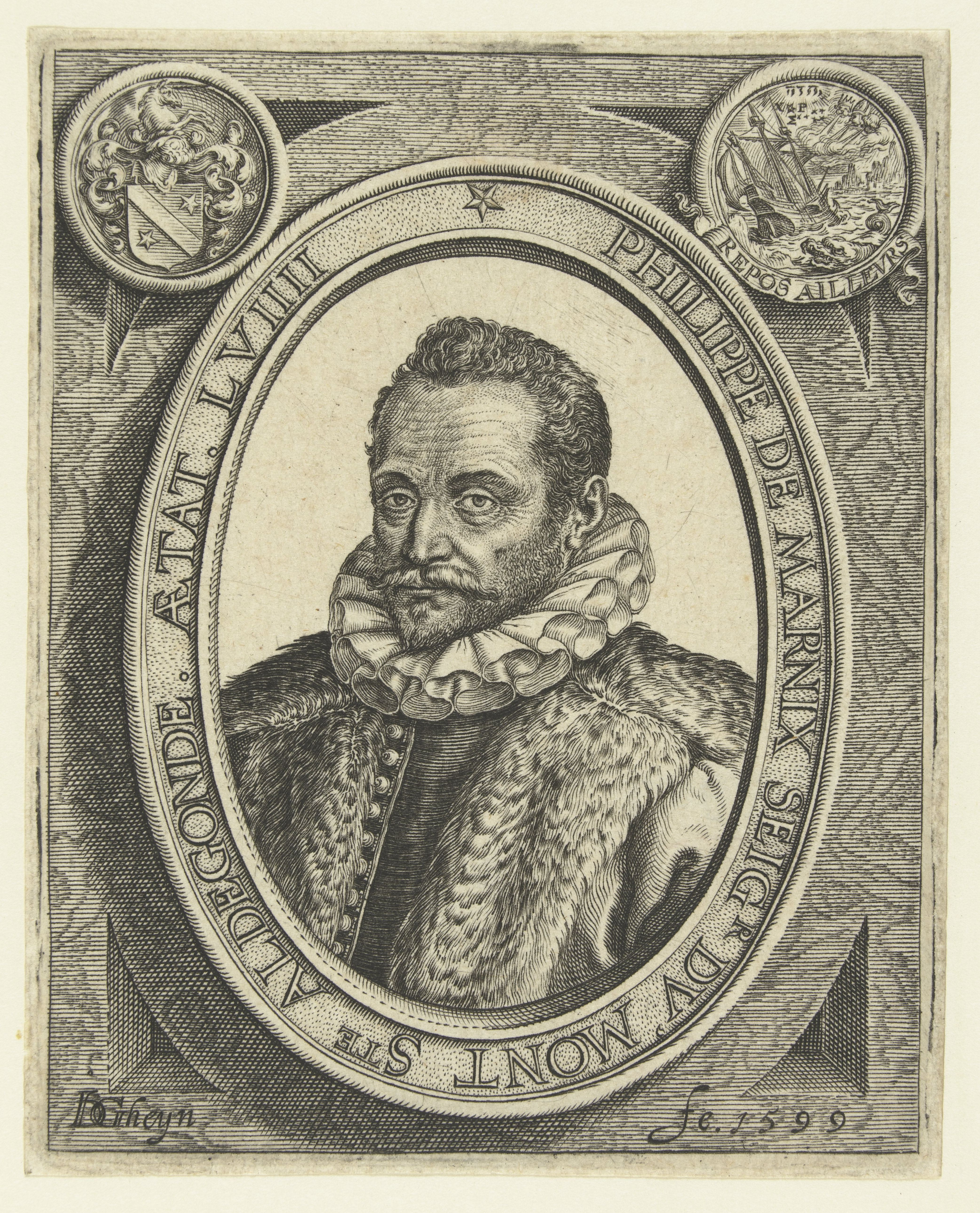
- Lord of Saint-Aldegonde, portrait by Jacques de Gheyn II

Lord Mayor of Antwerp
- In office 1583–1584

Lord of Saint-Aldegonde
- In office 1558–1598
- Preceded by: Jacob of Marnix

Personal details
- Born: 1540 Brussels, Brabant, Spain
- Died: 15 December 1598 (aged 57–58) Leiden, Holland, The Netherlands
- Spouse(s): Philippotte, Lady of Belle de Bailleul

Philips of Marnix, Lord of Saint-Aldegonde, Lord of West-Souburg (Dutch: Filips van Marnix, heer van Sint-Aldegonde, heer van West-Souburg, French: Philippe de Marnix, seigneur de Sainte-Aldegonde; 7 March/20 July 1540 – 15 December 1598) was a Flemish and Dutch writer and statesman, and the probable author of the text of the Dutch national anthem, the Wilhelmus.

== Biography - career ==

Marnix of St. Aldegonde was born in Brussels, the son of Jacob of Marnix. He studied theology under John Calvin and Theodore Beza at Geneva. Returning to the Habsburg Netherlands in 1560, he threw himself into the cause of the Reformation, taking an active part in the compromise of the nobles in 1565 and the assembly of Sint-Truiden. He issued a pamphlet in justification of the iconoclastic movement Beeldenstorm which devastated many churches in Flanders in 1566, and on the Duke of Alba's arrival next year had to flee the country.

After spending some time in Friesland and in the Electorate of the Palatinate he was in 1570 taken into the service of William, prince of Orange, and in 1572 was sent as his representative to the first meeting of the States-General assembled at Dordrecht. In 1573 he was taken prisoner by the Spaniards at Maaslandsluys, but was exchanged in the following year. He was sent as the representative of the insurgent provinces to Paris and London, where he attempted in vain to secure the effective assistance of Queen, Elizabeth I of England.

In 1578 he was at the Diet of Worms, where he made an eloquent, but fruitless, appeal for aid to the German princes. Equally vain were his efforts in the same year to persuade the magistrates of Ghent to cease persecuting the Catholics in the city. He took a conspicuous part in arranging the Union of Utrecht. In 1583 was chosen burgomaster of Antwerp. In 1585 he surrendered the city, after the months' Siege of Antwerp, to the Spaniards. Attacked by the English and by his own countrymen for this act, he retired from public affairs and, save for a mission to Paris in 1590, lived henceforth in Leiden or on his estate in Zeeland, where he worked at a translation of the Bible.

His daughter Elizabeth married Sir Charles Morgan, a Welsh mercenary serving with the Dutch States Army who ended his career as Governor of Bergen op Zoom. He died in Leiden on 15 December 1598.

== Literary work ==
St. Aldegonde, or Marnix (by which name he is very commonly known), is celebrated for his share in the great development of Dutch literature which followed the classical period represented by such writers as the poet and historian Pieter Hooft. Of his works, the best known is the Roman Bee-hive (De roomsche byen-korf), published in 1569 during his exile in Friesland, a bitter satire on the faith and practices of the Roman Catholic Church. This was translated, or adapted, in French, German and English (by George Gilpin). He also wrote an educational treatise dedicated to John, Count of Nassau. As a poet, St. Aldegonde is mainly known through his metrical translation of the Psalms (1580/1591); and, the Dutch national anthem Wilhelmus van Nassouwe is also ascribed to him. His complete works, edited by Lacroix and Quinet, were published at Brussels in 7 volumes (1855–1859), and his religious and theological writings, edited by Van Toorenenbergen, at The Hague, in 4 volumes (1871–1891).

Marnix wrote one of the earliest Bible translations into Dutch.

Less known to the general public is his work as a cryptographer. St. Aldegonde is considered to be the first Dutch cryptographer (cfr. The Codebreakers). For Stadholder William the Silent, he deciphered secret messages that were intercepted from the Spaniards. His interest in cryptography possibly shows in the Wilhelmus, where the first letters of the couplets form the name Willem van Nassov, i.e. William 'the Silent' of Nassau, the Prince of Orange, but such acrostics - and far more intricate poetic devices - were a common feature of the Rederijker school in the Lowlands.

There is a marble sculpture of him by Paul de Vigne in Brussels.

Marnix could speak Spanish, and this influenced his writing style.

== See also ==
- House of Marnix
- House of Coloma
- Marnixstraat
- Bornem Castle
- Saint Aldegonde

== Sources and references ==
- Media related to Philips of Marnix, Lord of Saint-Aldegonde at Wikimedia Commons
- Edgar Quinet, Marnix de St Aldegonde (Paris, 1854)
- Théodore Juste, Vie de Marnix (The Hague, 1858); Frédéricq, Marnix en zijnenederlandsche geschriften (Ghent, 1882)
- Tjalma, Philips van Marnix, heer van Sint-Aldegonde (Amsterdam, 1896)
- 'On the Education of Youth', trans. Robert de Rycke in 'History of Education Quarterly', Summer 1970)
