= Bornem =

- Municipality
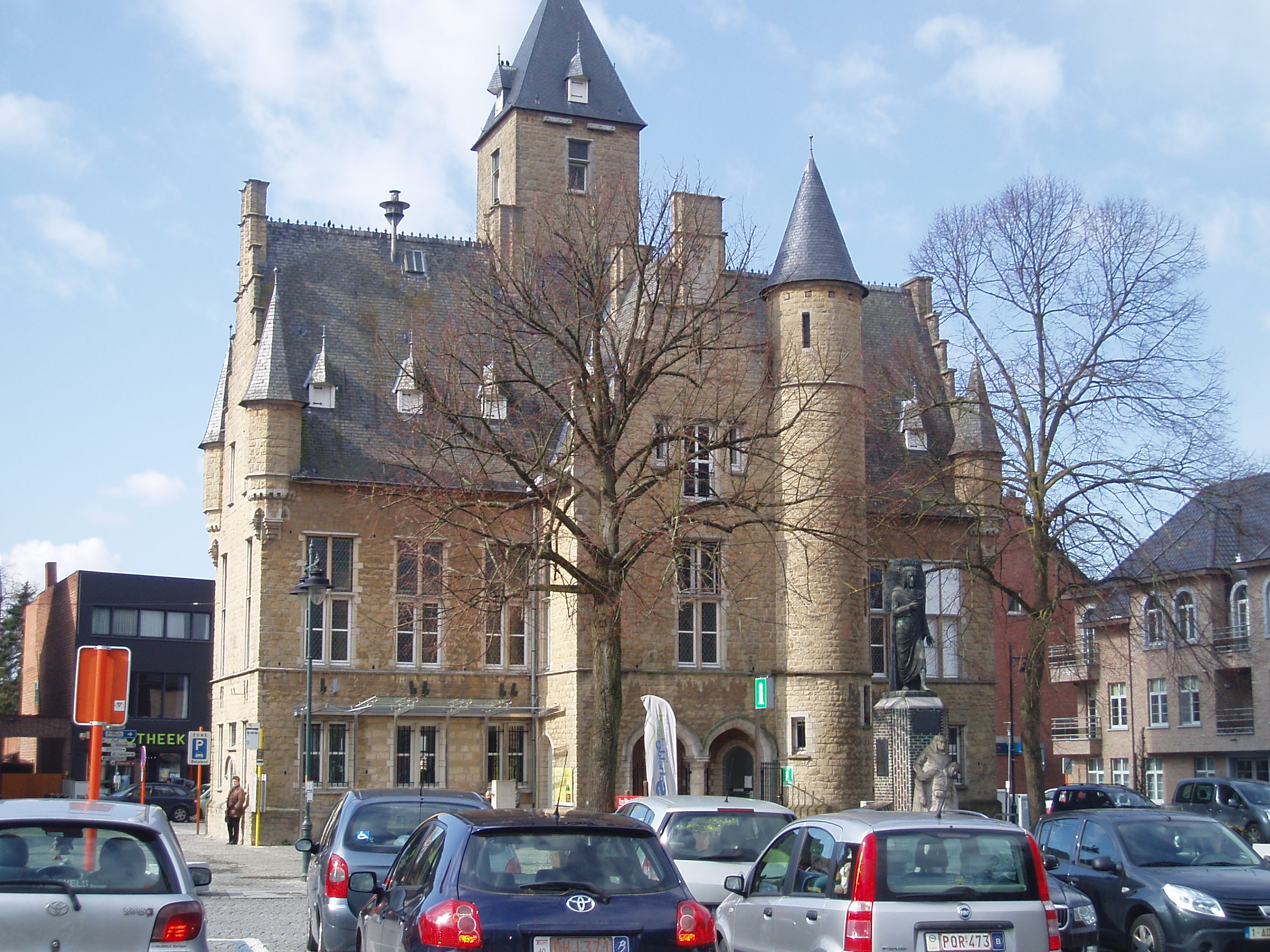

- Flag Coat of arms

- Location of Bornem in the province of Antwerp
- Interactive map of Bornem
- Location in Belgium
- Coordinates: 51°06′N 04°14′E
- Country: Belgium
- Community: Flemish Community
- Region: Flemish Region
- Province: Antwerp
- Arrondissement: Mechelen

Government
  - Mayor: Kristof Joos (CD&V)
  - Governing parties: N-VA, IedereenBornem

Area
  - Total: 46.19 km^{2} (17.83 sq mi)

Population (2020-01-01)
  - Total: 21,353
  - Density: 462.3/km^{2} (1,197/sq mi)
- Postal codes: 2880
- NIS code: 12007
- Area codes: 03, 052
- Website: www.bornem.be

Bornem (Dutch pronunciation: [ˈbɔrnəm]; old spelling: Bornhem) is a municipality located in the Belgian province of Antwerp. The municipality comprises the village of Bornem proper, Hingene, Mariekerke and Weert, and Wintam. There are also the hamlets of Branst, Buitenland, Eikevliet and Wintam. In 2021, Bornem had a total population of 21,428. The total area is 45.76 km^{2}.

== Geography ==
=== Heritage ===
- Bornem Castle, Residence of Marnix van Sinte-Aldegonde.
- Bornem Abbey, only Cistercian Abbey in Flanders: residence of former abbot general Amadeus de Bie and Henricus Smeulders.

=== Climate ===
Bornem has an oceanic climate (Köppen: Cfb).

Climate data for Bornem (1991−2020 normals)
Month	Jan	Feb	Mar	Apr	May	Jun	Jul	Aug	Sep	Oct	Nov	Dec	Year
Mean daily maximum °C (°F)	6.8 (44.2)	7.8 (46.0)	11.4 (52.5)	15.7 (60.3)	19.2 (66.6)	21.9 (71.4)	23.9 (75.0)	23.8 (74.8)	20.3 (68.5)	15.6 (60.1)	10.5 (50.9)	7.2 (45.0)	15.4 (59.7)
Daily mean °C (°F)	4.1 (39.4)	4.6 (40.3)	7.3 (45.1)	10.6 (51.1)	14.2 (57.6)	17.1 (62.8)	19.1 (66.4)	18.8 (65.8)	15.6 (60.1)	11.7 (53.1)	7.6 (45.7)	4.7 (40.5)	11.3 (52.3)
Mean daily minimum °C (°F)	1.4 (34.5)	1.3 (34.3)	3.2 (37.8)	5.5 (41.9)	9.3 (48.7)	12.2 (54.0)	14.3 (57.7)	13.8 (56.8)	10.9 (51.6)	7.7 (45.9)	4.6 (40.3)	2.1 (35.8)	7.2 (45.0)
Average precipitation mm (inches)	73.2 (2.88)	62.8 (2.47)	56.2 (2.21)	43.4 (1.71)	58.3 (2.30)	70.6 (2.78)	81.5 (3.21)	83.2 (3.28)	74.1 (2.92)	71.2 (2.80)	82.0 (3.23)	90.8 (3.57)	847.3 (33.36)
Average precipitation days (≥ 1.0 mm)	13.1	11.7	10.8	9.1	10.2	10.2	10.7	10.9	10.5	11.8	13.6	14.3	136.8
Mean monthly sunshine hours	63	79	137	190	219	220	224	212	165	119	68	53	1,747
Source: Royal Meteorological Institute

== Notable people ==
- Walter Boeykens (b. Bornem, 6 January 1938), clarinetist
- Pedro Coloma, Baron of Bornhem, who purchased the lordship in 1586 and renovated the castle
- Jan Hammenecker (Mariekerke, 2 October 1878 – Westrode, 13 June 1932), writer and priest
- Marc Van Ranst (b. Bornem, 20 June 1965), virologist
- Dries De Bondt (b. Bornem, 4 July 1991), cyclist. 2020 Belgian National Road Race Cycling Champion
- Brian De Keersmaecker (b. Bornem 6 May 2000), footballer
- Amaury Cordeel (2002), racing driver
- Sam Huybrecht , DJ aka Pegassi

== See also ==
- Dodentocht
- Bornem Titans, an American football team
- Bornem abbey beer is brewed by Brouwerij Van Steenberge in Ertvelde
- Klein-Brabant
