= Emmanuel Coloma y Escolana =

Portrait by José García Hidalgo

Emmanuel Coloma y Escolana, called Manuel, (1637 – 1717), was 2nd Marquess of Canales de Chozas and a Spanish Ambassador.

He was the son of don Pedro Coloma, Royal Secretary of Felipe IV. His brother was Secretary of State of King Carlos II. He was already since childhood Knight of Santiago. He married in 1691 to the Belgian countess Maximilienne Dorothea de t'Serclaes de Tilly, daughter of Jean-Werner and Marie Francois de Montmorency.

== Career ==
He became secretary of the Council of Royal Orders. He was ambassador in 1689 to the Dutch Republic of The Spanish King. Later he was sent to the United Kingdom until 1699. He ended his career as captain general of the royal artillery.

After his death, he was succeeded by his daughter Maria Teresa Coloma, 3rd Marquessa of Canales de Chozas.

== See also ==
- Francisco Coloma y Maceda, Marquess of Canales de Chozas.
