= Jean Alphonse, 1st Count de Coloma =

Jean Alphonse, 1st Count de Coloma (28 January 1677 – 7 January 1739), was a Flemish noble lord of Spanish descent, a member of the House of Coloma. He was a councillor on the Great Council of Mechelen and the supreme council in Vienna, and president of the Privy Council of the Habsburg Netherlands .

== family ==
Coloma was born in Antwerp, the great-grandson of Pedro Coloma, Baron of Bornhem, grandson of Pedro Coloma, Viscount of Dourlens, and the third son – born postmortem – of Pierre Coloma, 1st Baron of Moriensart and his wife Anne-Elisabeth de Bejar, Lady of Westackerre. He was the uncle of Rosa Alexandra Coloma, who married Nicolas vander Dilft, mayor of Brussels.

He was educated in Ghent by his great-uncle Joannes de Bejar, canon and scholaster of Ghent.

In 1705 he married Barbe le Poyvre, who died in Mechelen in 1724. After her death he married Lady Maria Claire de Romree, Lady of the Starry Cross and widow of his brother, the 2nd Baron of Moriensart, who had died in 1714.

=== His descendants ===
1. Pierre Alphonse Liévin, 2nd Count de Coloma. 1707-1745: Marr. Agathe van der Laan.
  1. Henri Pierre Philippe de Coloma, 1748.
  2. Jeanne Agathe de Coloma.
  3. Regine Marie de Coloma.
  4. Rose Marie de Coloma.
2. François Theodore Louis Coloma: died in the Battle of Guastalla, 1734.
3. Barbe Therese Coloma
4. Jean Baptiste Coloma
5. Maria Barbara Coloma
6. Vitalis Joseph
7. Barbe Norbertina
8. Charles Vital Alexandre Coloma, (1718–1758): Honorary Lord Chamberlain of the Duke of Lorraine. Married Eugenie Francois Roose, Lady of Sint-Pieters-Leeuw

== Career ==
In 1700 he obtained a degree in canon law from Louvain University. He was the author of the Theses philosophicae quas praeside doctissimo D. ac M. Carolo Guiberto Wautyer ex gentinnes philosophiae professore primario, defendet. He soon became a lawyer of the Council of Flanders in Ghent. He was dispensed from taking the great oath. He was one of the most important and powerful judges of the country. In 1714 he was appointed to financial cases before the Great Council of Mechelen. He was sent to Vienna in 1725 and left Mechelen. Coloma was in favour of the imperial court. His son Charles became honorary chamberlain of the Empress. In 1732 he returned from Austria as president of the Brussels Privy Council and Councillor of State and War. After his career he became the First Count de Coloma by imperial decree of 3 August 1728. In 1734 his son died in the War of the Polish Succession.

Coloma died in Brussels on 7 January 1739, and was buried in the Maes Chapel of the Church of St. Michael and St. Gudula (now the cathedral).

He resided in Mechelen in the Hotel de Coloma.

Government offices
| Preceded by Christophe-Ernest, 1st Count of Baillet | 19th President of the Privy Council; 1733-1739 | Succeeded by Gilles-Augustin de Steenhault |
