= Koloma =

Koloma may refer to:

- Koloma, a script formerly used for the Kokborok language of India and Bangladesh
- Koloma, California, a Native American settlement

== See also ==
- Coloma (disambiguation)
