= Weert, Antwerp =

Weert
- Village
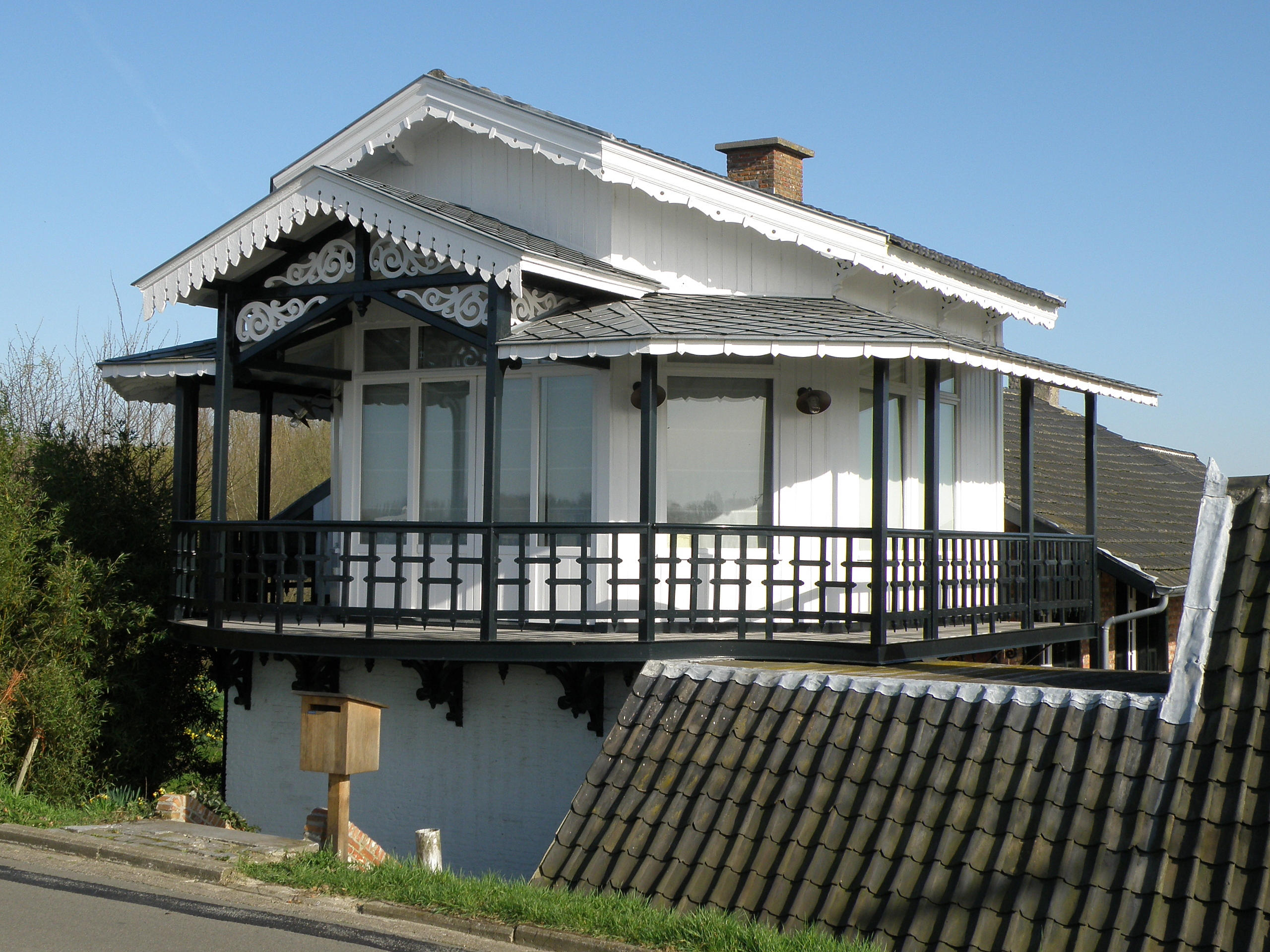
- Villa in Weert

- Location in Belgium
- Coordinates: 51.10229°N 4.18998°E
- Country: Belgium
- Region: Flemish Region
- Province: Antwerp
- Municipality: Bornem

Area
  - Total: 5.05 km^{2} (1.95 sq mi)

Population (2021)
  - Total: 462
  - Density: 91.5/km^{2} (237/sq mi)
- Time zone: CET

Weert is a village in the municipality of Bornem, Antwerp Province, Belgium.

The village used to located on the left bank of the Scheldt, but the river changed course during the 13th century, and it is now located on the right bank. The village was first mentioned in 1240 when it was sold to the Saint Bavo's Abbey in Ghent for cultivation. Around 1320, the area was enclosed by dikes. Weert was an independent municipality until 1977, when it was merged into Bornem.

== Gallery ==
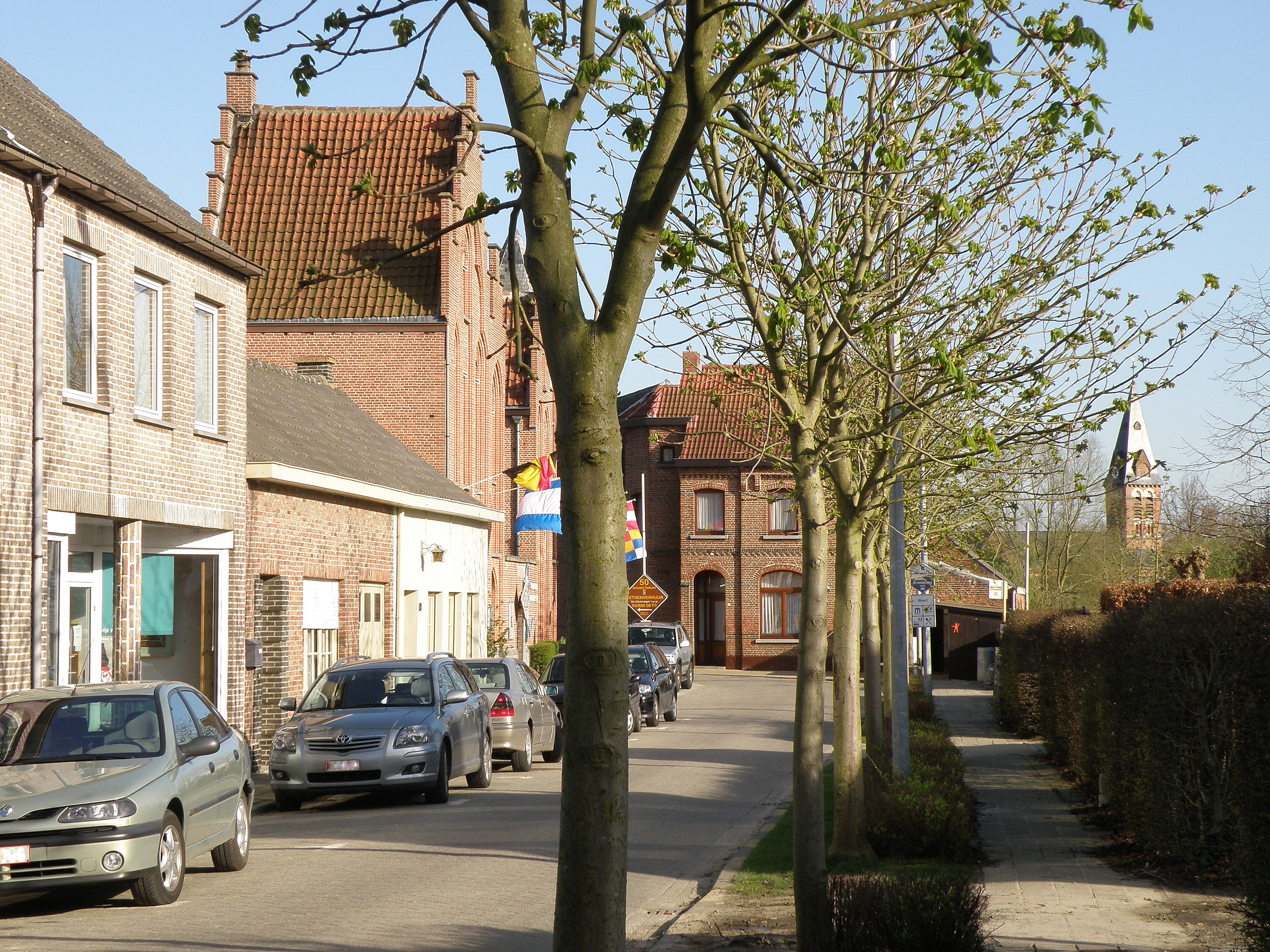
Street view

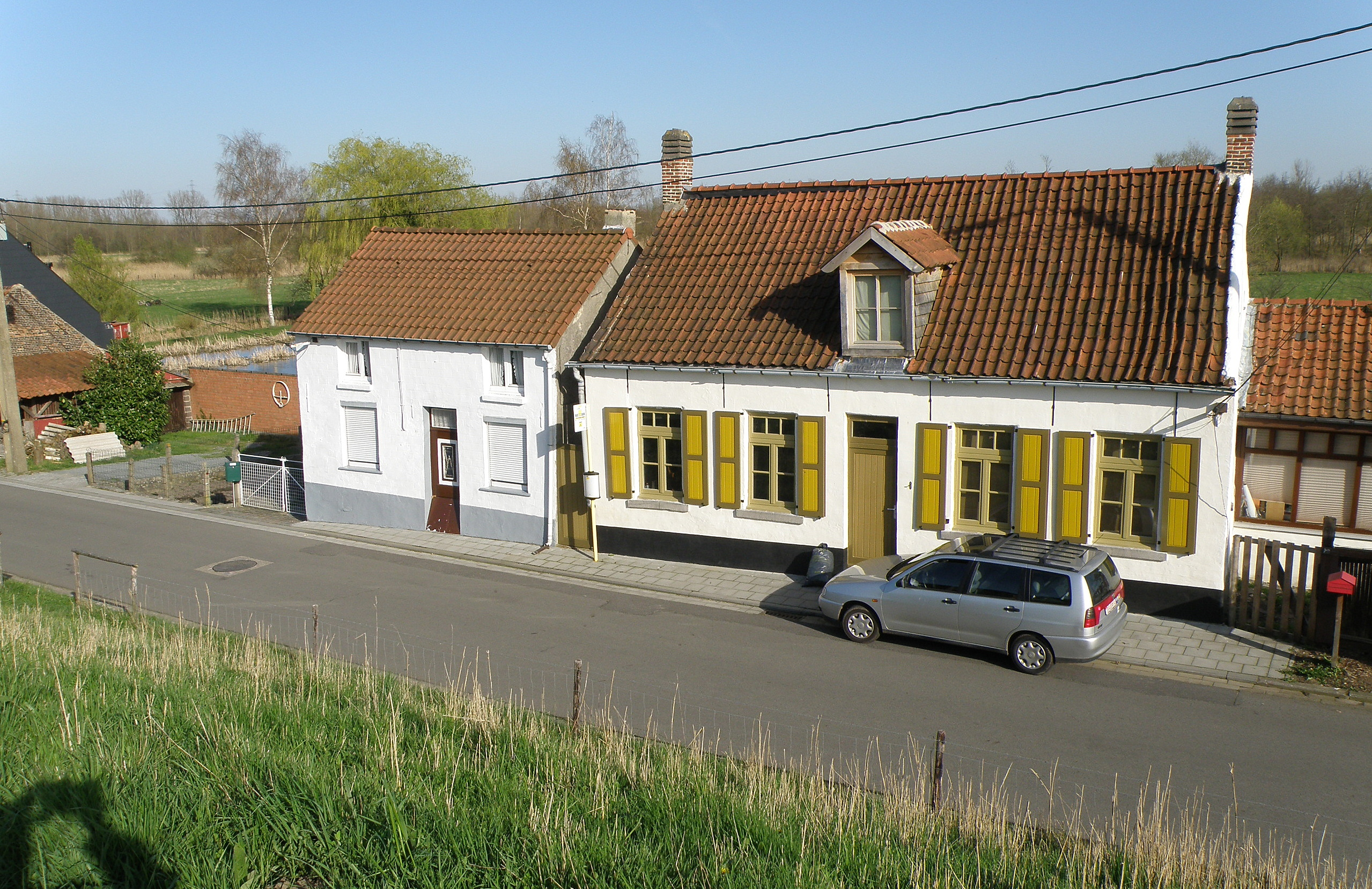
View from the dike

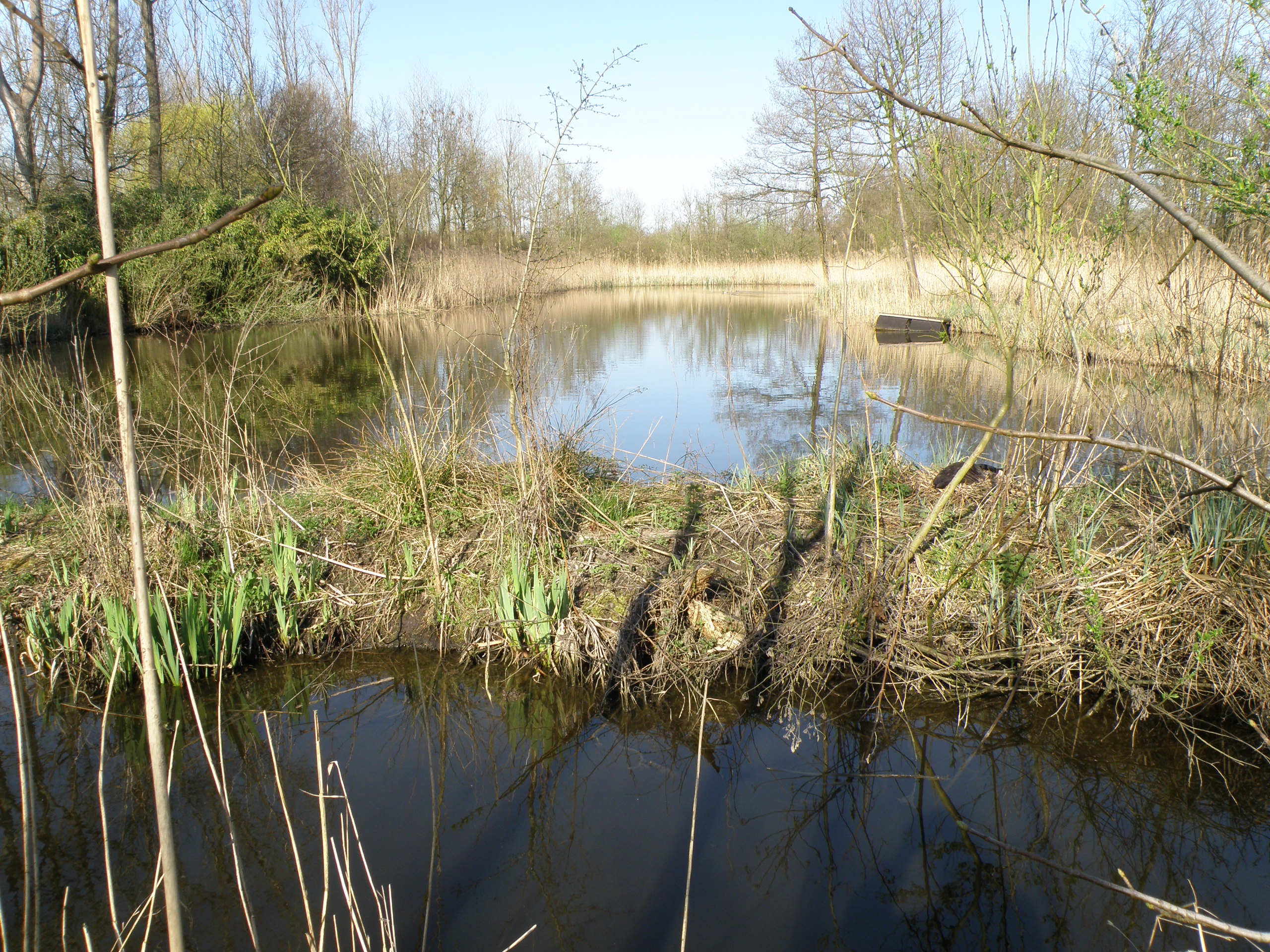
Moor near Weert
