= House of Marnix =

Noble family associated with the Habsburg Netherlands and Belgium

Coat of arms attributed to Philips of Marnix, Lord of Saint-Aldegonde

The House of Marnix (Dutch: Huis van Marnix; French: Maison de Marnix), later usually known as de Marnix de Sainte-Aldegonde, is a noble family associated with the former Habsburg Netherlands and with Belgium. The family became established in the Low Countries in the early sixteenth century and was connected with lordships including Toulouse, Baudrenghien, Mont-Sainte-Aldegonde, Pottes, West-Souburg and Bornem. Its best-known member is Philips of Marnix, Lord of Saint-Aldegonde (1540–1598), a writer, Calvinist politician and adviser of William the Silent.

== Origins ==
According to the Leiden University Dutch Revolt project, the Marnix family originally came from Savoy. A Marnix ancestor entered the Netherlands in 1507 in the service of Margaret of Austria, who had become governor of the Habsburg Netherlands. Through Habsburg service, the family acquired property and influence in the Free County of Burgundy and the Low Countries.

A key early figure was Jacques de Marnix, baron of Pottes, who died in 1557. The Nieuw Nederlandsch biografisch woordenboek states that Charles V appointed him a knight in 1543 and that he held several military and civil offices. Through his first marriage to Marie de Haméricourt, Jacques obtained Mont-Sainte-Aldegonde and Boulant in Hainaut. He later bought the barony of Pottes near Lille.

The name Sainte-Aldegonde came from the lordship of Mont-Sainte-Aldegonde in Hainaut. The later family name de Marnix de Sainte-Aldegonde therefore joined the older family name with one of the family's most important lordships.

== Sixteenth century ==
The family became politically important during the early decades of the Dutch Revolt. Jean de Marnix, lord of Toulouse, was born in Brussels in 1537 or 1538 and died at the Battle of Oosterweel on 13 March 1567. He was a son of Jacques de Marnix and an elder brother of Philips of Marnix. He inherited Marnix, Toulouse and Baudrenghien, and was usually known as lord of Toulouse. The Nieuw Nederlandsch biografisch woordenboek describes him as one of the figures involved in the secret meetings that led to the Compromise of the Nobles.

The most famous member of the family was Philips of Marnix, Lord of Saint-Aldegonde. He studied at Leuven, Dole and Geneva and became a supporter of the Reformation. During the Dutch Revolt he served William the Silent as a writer, diplomat and political adviser. In 1572 he represented William at the first free meeting of the States of Holland in Dordrecht. He later became burgomaster of Antwerp and signed the city's surrender to Alexander Farnese in 1585.

Philips of Marnix was also known as a writer and polemicist. His best-known work was De byencorf der H. roomscher kercke, an anti-Catholic satire. He was long traditionally associated with the authorship of the Wilhelmus, the Dutch national anthem, although modern scholarship has treated that attribution with caution.

== Bornem line ==
In the eighteenth century, the family became closely associated with Bornem Castle in the province of Antwerp. The Flemish Inventory of Immovable Heritage states that the castle estate has belonged to the Marnix family since 1773, officially since 1780, and that the family used the name de Marnix de Sainte-Aldegonde from the nineteenth century. The same source describes the present castle as a protected heritage site and notes that it was largely rebuilt in the late nineteenth century on the foundations of the older castle.

Bornem became the main territorial and symbolic seat of the later family. The estate connected the Marnix name with the Belgian aristocracy of the nineteenth and twentieth centuries, while the earlier fame of the family continued to rest mainly on Philips of Marnix and the Dutch Revolt.

== Notable members ==
- Jacques de Marnix (died 1557), baron of Pottes, knight and Habsburg official.
- Jean de Marnix (1537 or 1538–1567), lord of Toulouse and participant in the early stages of the Dutch Revolt.
- Philips of Marnix, Lord of Saint-Aldegonde (1540–1598), writer, diplomat, Calvinist politician and adviser of William the Silent.
- Claude-François de Marnix (1723–1780), count of Bornem, associated with the family's later Bornem line.
- Charles-Ghislain-Marie de Marnix (1780–1832), count of Bornem and political figure in the period of the United Kingdom of the Netherlands.

== Heraldry ==
A coat of arms attributed to Philips of Marnix shows an azure field with a silver bend accompanied by two golden stars. The motto associated with Philips of Marnix was Repos ailleurs, meaning "Rest elsewhere".

== See also ==
- Philips of Marnix, Lord of Saint-Aldegonde
- Bornem Castle
- Dutch Revolt
- William the Silent
