= Silke Van Avermaet =

Belgian volleyball player (born 1999)

Personal information
- Nationality: Belgian
- Born: 2 June 1999 (age 27); Dendermonde, Belgium
- Height: 192 cm (76 in)
- Weight: 76 kg (168 lb)
- Spike: 311 cm (122 in)
- Block: 290 cm (114 in)

Volleyball information
- Current club: (Italy) Igor Gorgonzola Novara
- Number: 2 (club); 19 (national team)

Career
| Years | Teams |
|---|---|
| 2014–2015 | (Belgium) Vilvoorde |
| 2015–2021 | (Belgium) Asterix AVO Beveren |
| 2021–2024 | (France) ASPTT Mulhouse |
| 2024– | (Italy) UYBA Volley |

National team
| 2018– | Belgium |

Silke Van Avermaet (born 2 June 1999) is a Belgian volleyball player. She is part of the Belgium women's national volleyball team.

Van Avermaet grew up in Baasrode and attended the Topsportschool Vilvoorde.

She competed at the 2015 FIVB Volleyball Girls' U18 World Championship, and 2018 FIVB Volleyball Women's Nations League. On club level she plays for UYBA Volley.
