= León de Garro y Javier =

- Coat of Arms of Garro's

Alcalde of Pamplona
- In office 1605–1606
- Monarch: Louis XIII

Personal details
- Born: 16th century Pamplona, Navarra
- Died: 17th century Pamplona, Navarra
- Resting place: Pamplona Cathedral
- Spouse: Inés de Coloma y Luna
- Occupation: Count; Politician

León de Garro y Javier was a Basque nobleman, Count of Javier and Viscount of Zolina.

== Biography ==
León was born in Pamplona, Kingdom of Navarre, son of Jerónimo de Garro and Ana de Javier, belonging to the Basque nobility. He was married to the noble lady Inés de Coloma, daughter of don Pedro Coloma, Lord of Malon and Maria de Luna.

In 1604, León de Garro was appointed Alcalde ordinario in Pamplona.
