= Bornem Castle =

Former castle in Bornem, Antwerp, Belgium

Coordinates: 51.1029°N 4.2167°E

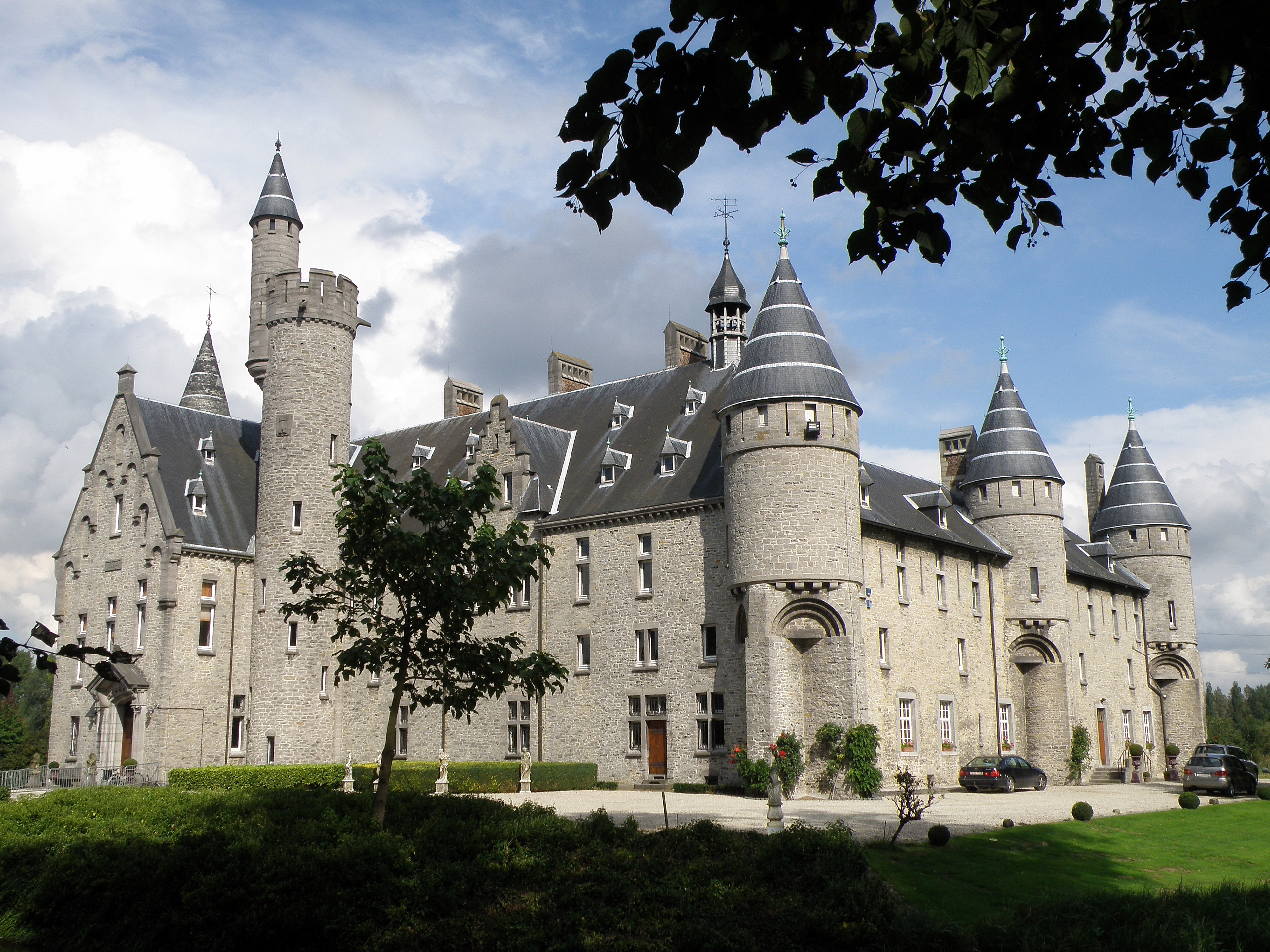
Bornem Castle

Bornem Castle, also known as the Marnix de Sainte-Aldegonde Castle (Dutch: Kasteel van Bornem, or Kasteel Marnix de Sainte-Aldegonde), is a country house, formerly a castle, located in Bornem, province of Antwerp, Belgium. Bornem Castle is situated at an elevation of 1 meters.

== History ==
The building stands on the Oude Schelde, a dead arm of the river Scheldt. The earliest fortification on the site was of the 10th or 11th centuries and was intended to defend against the incursions of the Vikings. A manor house was built on the foundations of the older building in 1587 by the Spanish nobleman Pedro Coloma, Baron of Bornhem and lord of Bobadilla, a follower of Alexander Farnese. The property was afterwards leased by the family de Marnix de Sainte-Aldegonde, who became the outright owners in 1773.

The present house was built on the same site at the end of the 19th century to plans by Hendrik Beyaert, after the remains of the 16th-century building had been demolished. It remains in ownership of the house Marnix de Sainte-Aldegonde, the current resident is John de Marnix de Sainte-Aldegonde, 14th Count of Bornem.

== List of Chatelains ==
=== House of Coloma ===
1. Pedro Coloma, Baron of Bornhem
2. Alexandre Coloma, second baron of Bornhem
3. Pierre Coloma, Viscount of Dourlens, third baron of Bornhem
4. Jean-François Coloma, fourth baron and (1658) 1st Count of Bornhem
5. François-Claude Coloma, 2nd Count of Bornhem
6. Charles-Joseph-François Coloma, 3rd Count of Bornhem, died 1724
7. Marie-Florence Coloma, 4th Countess of Bornhem
8. Aldegonde-Eleonore de Lannoy; Lady of Bornem: marr. Baudry-Adelbert de Marnix.

=== House of Marnix ===
Period	Title	Name
1773-1780	7th Count of Bornem	Claude-François de Marnix
1780-1832	8th Count of Bornem	Charles-Ghislain, Count de Marnix
1832-1861	9th Count of Bornem	Louis-Joseph, Count de Marnix
1861-1891	10th Count of Bornem	Victor de Marnix de Sainte-Aldegonde
1891-1913	11th Count of Bornem	Ferdinand de Marnix de Sainte-Aldegonde
1913-1963	12th Count of Bornem	John I de Marnix de Sainte-Aldegonde
1963-1968	13th Count of Bornem	Adrien de Marnix de Sainte-Aldegonde
1968-	14th Count of Bornem	John II de Marnix de Sainte-Aldegonde

== See also ==
- List of castles in Belgium
