= Vlassenbroek =

Coordinates: 51°02′54″N 4°07′49″E

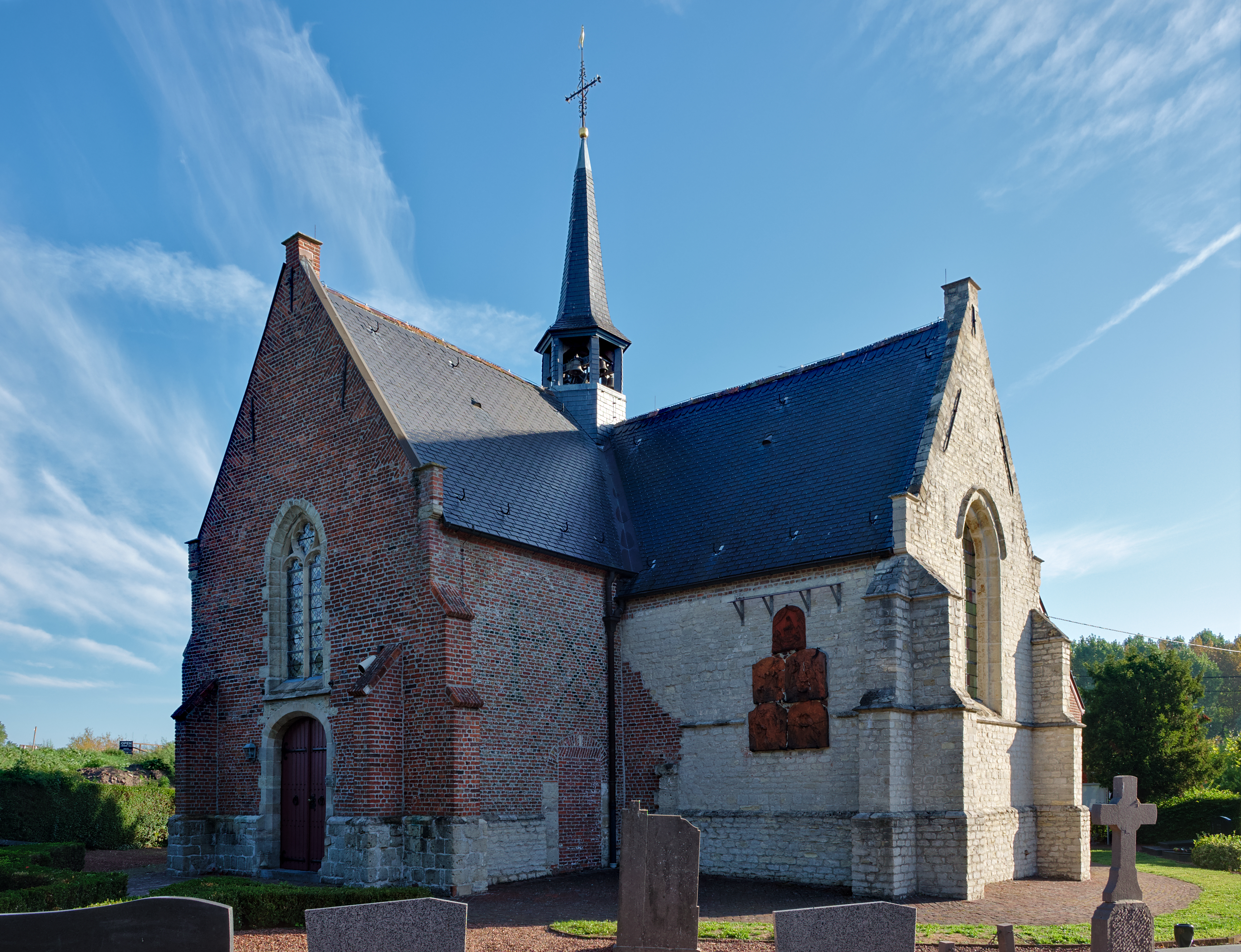
- Interactive map of Vlassenbroek

Vlassenbroek is a village in the municipality of Dendermonde, in East Flanders, Belgium.

== History ==
In the early Middle Ages the village of Vlassenbroek was part of the Baceroth-estate that also included present-day Baasrode, Sint-Amands and Mariekerke. In the eleventh century the Baceroth-estate was split up and the parish of Vlassenbroek came to reside under the authority of the Land van Dendermonde.

A deed form 1216 mentions a chapel in Vlassenboek and a deed from 1375 mentions a church in Vlassenbroek (ecclesiam de Vlassenbrouc).

Throughout its history Vlassenbroek, located on the banks of the river Scheldt and only a few meters above sea-level, often had to deal with floods. This remained a problem until the 18th century.

In 1578 the church was destroyed by Protestants during the Beeldenstorm. It was not rebuilt until 1640.

Vlassenbroek is mentioned on the Ferraris map from the 1770s as Vlassenbrouck.

In the beginning of the 19th century Vlassenbroek became part of the village of Baasrode. By the end of the century, Vlassenbroek had become a popular destination for artists. Painters such as Jacques Rosseels and Florent Crabeels moved to Vlassenbroek.

In 1945, at the end of the second World War, the church was damaged. It was repaired by 1960.

In the 1970s and 1980s Vlassenbroek briefly gained international notoriety when the BRT covered the story of Delphine Lambrecht, an inn keeper from Vlassenbroek who served her customers muskrat, and TV crews from the Netherlands, France and Canada flocked to Vlassenbroek to interview her.
