= Gerard Walschap =

Belgian writer

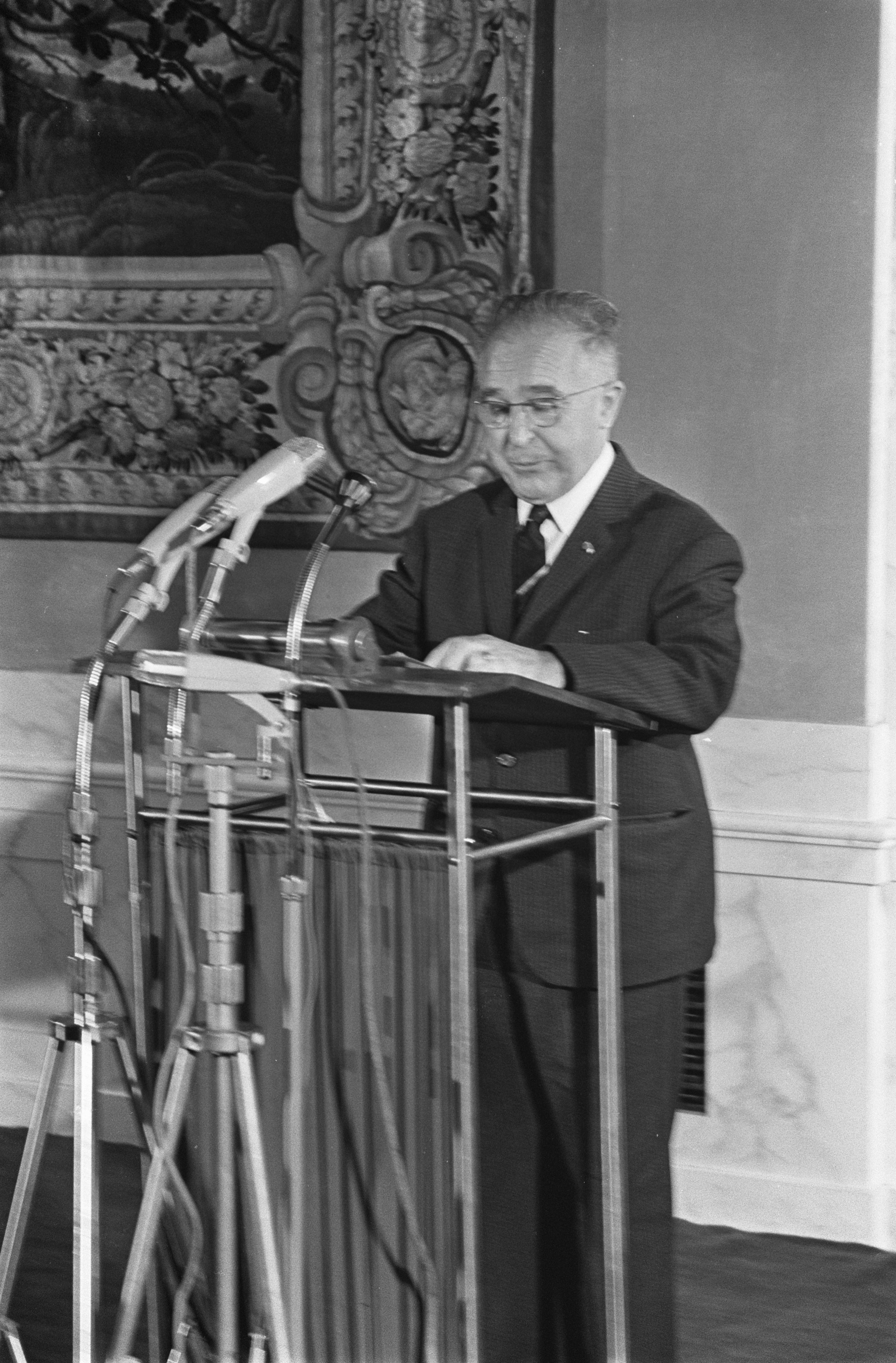
Gerard Walschap (1968)

Jacob Lodewijk Gerard, Baron Walschap (9 July 1898 – 25 October 1989), was a Belgian writer.

== Early life ==
Walschap was born in Londerzeel-St. Jozef in 1898. He went to highschool at the Klein seminarie in Hoogstraten, and later in Asse. His Flemish awareness was in these days encouraged by the priest and poet Jan Hammenecker. In Leuven, he entered the school for priests of the Missionaries of the Sacred Heart, but did not finish to be ordained as a priest.

In 1923, he became secretary at the weekly magazine Het Vlaamsche land (E: Flemish country). In 1925, he married Marie-Antoinette Theunissen (1901–1979) in Maaseik, and a year later their son, Hugo was born. Alice Nahon acted as a nurse and wrote a poem for the occasion Aan Hugo's fijne stemmeke (E: To Hugo's fine voice). Hugo Walschap became ambassador of the king of Belgium. He was

In 1927, his second son, Guido, was born. In 1930, his third son, Lieven, was born, and in 1932, his daughter Caroline (Carla Walschap). In 1935, he narrowly escaped death, a victim of carbon monoxide poisoning in the bathroom, but is saved by his wife. His fourth son, Bruno, was born in 1938.

== Literary career ==
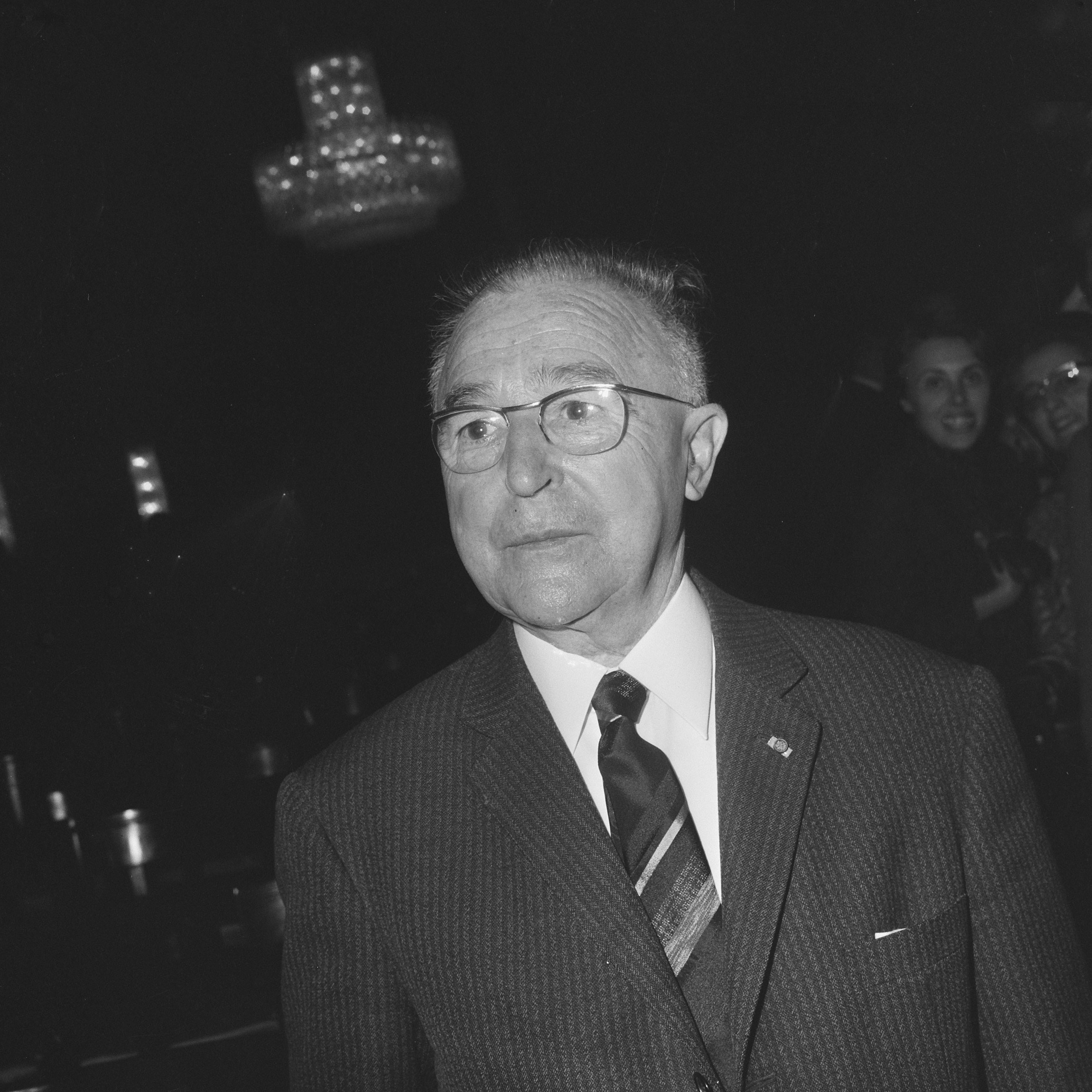
Walschap (1968)

As a writer he started his literary career with romantic poetry and Catholicism inspired theatre plays. In 1928, he published his first novel Waldo. He became widely known with his novel Adelaide, which appeared in 1929, and which was the first of a series of novels. Although initially well-received, the book caused him the rancour of the clergy, and his books were placed on the Index Librorum Prohibitorum. This adverse reaction, which was not intended by Walschap, hurt him and after a long inner struggle and doubt he abandoned his faith and became a secular humanist. This inner struggle (with faith) would remain of significant importance in his literary work. Adelaide became part of the De familie Roothooft.

In part of his work he considered society a burden which is hard to bear, such as in De bejegening van Christus (E: Meeting with Christ) (1940). In his work he also glorified the extremes of society, such as the primitive life in Volk (E: people) and De dood in het dorp (E: Death in the village) (1930), and the almost aggressive freedom in Het kind (E: The child) (1939) and De consul (1943) and the expression of worriless freedom in probably his most famous work Houtekiet (1939).

His novel Zwart en wit (E: black and white) of 1948, dealt with the collaboration (Nazi-Collaborators were called blacks in Belgium, and resistance fighters whites) with Nazism and the repression after World War II. Zuster Virgilia, of 1951, dealt with the eternal fight between faith and disbelief. In his book Oproer in Kongo (E: Revolt in Congo) from 1953, he wrote about colonialism, which he conceived after along journey through Belgian Congo in 1951. As a writer he revealed his own inner self in Het gastmaal (1966) en Het avondmaal (E: Dinner) (1968), by using a modernistic writing style.

He received several literary prizes, among which in 1968 was the Prijs der Nederlandse Letteren, and in 1975 he was knighted and made a Baron.

Walschap died in Antwerp in 1989.

== Honours ==
- Grand Cross in the Order of Leopold II
- Grand officer in the Order of Leopold
- Grand Officer in the Order of the Crown.

== Bibliography ==
- Liederen van leed (1923, poetry)
- Flirt (1924, theatre)
- Levens' vier seizoenen (1924, theatre)
- De looze streken van Slimke Gazelle (1924, children's story)
- Dies irae (1924, theatre)
- Lente (1924, theatre)
- De loutering (1925, poetry)
- De vuurproef (1925, theatre, together with Frans Delbeke)
- Franciscus en de jongeren (1926, article)
- Maskaroen (1927, theatre)
- Slimke. Een boekje voor kinderen (1927)
- Waldo (1928, novel)
- Adalaïde (1929, novel)
- Volk (1930, stories) (including : Leven de grafmaker – Teugels' Gust – De goddeloosheid van Soo Kommer – Petrus)
- De dood in het dorp (1930, verhalen) (omvattend : De neutrale pastoor – Leven van Soo Moereman – Het verlangen van Stieneke – J. De Soete, barbier, estaminet – De meester – Huybrechs-Bergé – Soo De Kommer – De Mops – Het onnozel leven van Gielen – Het droevig leven van Rozeke – Leven van Zjeppen – Die van Cuypers)
- Uitingen in de moderne wereldletterkunde (1930, essay)
- Eric (1931, novel)
- Nooit meer oorlog (1931, pamphlet)
- Jan Frans Cantré (1932, monography)
- Carla (1933, novel)
- Trouwen (1933, novel)
- Celibaat (1934, novel)
- De vierde koning (1935, story)
- Een mens van goede wil (1936, novel)
- De kermis te Pontosie (1937, theatre)
- De Spaansche gebroeders (1937, theatre)
- Sybille (1938, novel)
- Het kind (1939, novel)
- De familie Roothooft (Adelaïde, Eric, Carla) (1939, novel)
- Houtekiet (1939, novel)
- Vaarwel dan ! (1940, brochure)
- Bejegening van Christus (1940, novel)
- De wereld van Soo Moereman (1941, story)
- Zotje Petotje (1941, children's story)
- Gansje Kwak (1942, children's story)
- Denise (1942, novel)
- Genezing door aspirine (1942, story)
- Voorpostgevechten (1943, essay)
- De consul (1943, novel)
- Tor (1944, novel)
- Wing en Wong (1945, youth story)
- De goede smokkelaar (1945, story)
- Ons geluk (1946, novel)
- De pacificatiepartij (1946, essay)
- Beeld van de humanist (1947, brochure)
- Zwart en wit (1948, novel)
- Voor geestelijke vrijheid (1948, brochure)
- Moeder (1950, novel)
- Zuster Virgilia (1951, novel)
- Hulde aan Dr. J. Lindemans (1952, essay)
- Hulde aan Stijn Streuvels (1952, essay)
- De toekomst van de letterkunde (1952, essay)
- Lof der academie (1952, essay)
- Janneman en de heks (1953; puppet play)
- Oproer in Kongo (1953, novel)
- De graaf (1953, story)
- Het kleine meisje en ik (1953, stories) (including : Moord op het konijntje – Corruptie bij een schildpad – De twee katjes – De rashond – Speelgoed van Sint-Niklaas – Het vosken – De boodschappen voor het consulaat)
- Manneke Maan (1954, novel)
- Salut en merci (1955, pamphlet)
- Janneke en Mieke in de oorlog (1955, children's story)
- Zotje Petotje thuis weg (1956, children's story)
- Paul komt thuis (1956, theatre play)
- De Française (1957, novel)
- De verloren zoon (1958, novel)
- August Van Cauwelaert (1959, essay)
- De ongelooflijke avonturen van Tilman Armenaas (1960, novel)
- Nieuw Deps (1961, novel)
- Genezing door aspirine en andere verhalen (1963, stories) (including : Genezing door aspirine – De graaf – Het voske)
- Celibaat (1963, novel)
- Muziek voor twee stemmen (1963, essay)
- Alter ego (1964, novel)
- Julien Kuypers (1966, essay)
- De kaartridder van Herpeneert (1966, story)
- De culturele repressie (1966, essay)
- Het gastmaal (1966, novel)
- Dossier Walschap (1966, collection of stories) (Omvattend: Vaarwel dan – Voorpostgevechten – Salut en merci – Weten en geloven in Vlaanderen = hoofdstuk 8 van "Muziek voor twee stemmen")
- Twee broers en hun kat (1966, children's story, in "Rippedepik")
- De deugniet en de arme vrouw (1966, children's story, in "Rippedepik")
- Een ezel als getuige (1966, children's story, in "Rippedepik")
- De arme rickshawloper (1966, children's story, in "Rippedepik")
- De oneerlijke stovenmaker (1966, children's story, in "Rippedepik")
- Het beursje met de gouden dollars (1966, children's story, in "Rippedepik")
- De slimme rechter (1966, children's story, in "Rippedepik")
- De kunsternaar en zijn volk (1967, essay)
- Het avondmaal (1968, novel)
- Zotje verkoopt een paard (1971, story, in "Ruppedepuk")
- Omnibus (1971) (including : Houtekiet – Zuster Virgilia – Celibaat)
- Van een olifant die struikrover werd (1973, children's story)
- Vijf van Walschap (1974, collection of stories) (Omvattend : Het voske – De consul – De kaartridder van Herpeneert – Genezing door aspirine – De graaf)
- Het Oramproject (1975, novel)
- Omnibus (1977) (including : Trouwens – Het kind – Moeder)
- Sprookjes (1978, = Birthday-omnibus) (including : Vertelsels van de 8 broers – De olifant die struikrover werd – Wing en Wong in Amerika – De slimme rechter)
- De helige Jan Mus (1979, roman)
- Rustoord (1979, roman)
- Tweede Walschapomnibus (children's stories) (including : Zotje ¨Petotje weer thuis – Slimke Gazelle en de gazelleneter- Gansje Kwak zoekt Carry)
- Verzameld Werk. Deel 1 (1988) (including : Waldo – Adelaïde – Eric – Carla – Volk – De dood in het dorp – Nooit meer oorlog – Trouwen – Celibaat)
- Verzameld Werk. Deel 2 (1989) (including : De vierde koning – Een mens van goede wil – Sybille – Het kind – Houtekiet – Bejegening van Christus – Vaarwel dan – De wereld van Soo Moereman)
- Autobiografie van mijn vader (1989)
- Verzameld Werk. Deel 3 (1990) (including : Denise – Voorpostgevechten – De consul – Tor – Genezing door aspirine – De goede smokkelaar – Ons geluk – De pacificatiepartij – Beeld van de humanist – Voor geestelijke vrijheid – Zwart en wit)
- Verzameld Werk. Deel 4 (1991) (including : Moeder – Zuster Virgilia – Oproer in Kongo – Het kleine meisje en ik – De graaf – Manneke Maan – Salut en merci – De Française)
- Verzameld Werk. Deel 5 (1992)
- Verzameld Werk. Deel 6 (1993) (including: Alter ego – De kaartridder van Heppeneert – Het gastmaal – Het avondmaal – Ernest Claes of De kunstenaar en zijn volk – De culturele repressie – Het Oramproject – De heilige Jan Mus – Autobiografie van mijn vader)
- Het heilig uilke (1996, story)
- Brieven I, 1921–1950 (1998)
- Losgetrokken en in de wereld geworpen (1998, collection of stories) (including : Trouwen – De graaf – Vier verhalen uit "De dood in het dorp" – Voorpostgevechten)

== See also ==
- Flemish literature

== Sources ==
- G.J. van Bork en P.J. Verkruijsse, De Nederlandse en Vlaamse auteurs (1985)
- Gerard Walschap
- Gerard Walschap
