= Christophe-Ernest, 1st Count of Baillet =

Christophe-Ernest, 1st Count of Baillet (1668–1732) was a leading figure in the government of the Austrian Netherlands.

== Family ==
Christophe-Ernest was born in Latour Castle on 1 September 1668 as youngest son of Maximilian II Antoine de Baillet, Lord of Latour and his wife, Anne Marie Coenen. He died without heirs and his branch died out: the title of Count of Baillet passed to the heirs of his older brother. He resided in Mechelen until 1725.

== Career ==
Charles II of Spain named Baillet to the Council of Luxembourg in 1699. In 1704 he was appointed to the Great Council of Mechelen, becoming president in 1716.

De Baillet played an important part in the trials of Frans Anneessens, in Brussels.

=== Rebelion of Mechelen ===
He was loyal to the crown during the anti-government disturbances of 1718 and played an important part in the protection of Mechelen, personally directing the successful defence of Mechelen's main square. De baillet received a delegation form the people and negotiated with them. Almost the negotiations failed when a child was shot: the mob was infuriated and the army decided to prepare the cannons in defence. However, de Baillet ran to one of the cannons and took the burning fuse, and put it out before the explosion. De Baillet was in the center of the battlefield trying to restore peace. The people who witnessed these courageous acts gained huge respect for the bravery of de Baillet. He succeeded to chase the regiments out of the city center and restore peace with the help of canon de Smet of the Cathedral chapter. He received the official benediction and gratitude of Cardinal d'Alsace for his leadership. De Baillet reported these acts tot the emperor in Vienna, but requested the emperor to be mercyfull for his people. For this proof of alliance and loyalty to the emperor he was created 1st count of Baillet by order of Charles VI.

On 21 and 23 August 1720 the Great Council produced a total of 87 Death-penalties, confiscations and banishments. At the end both the cardinal and the de Baillet personally begged the emperor for mercy, in 1721 the emperor accepted this request of the president and the cardinal. Count de Baillet could proudly inform the Great Council of this imperial arrest. Jean Alphonse, 1st Count de Coloma, councillor of the Great Council, noted that he was greatly moved and exclaimed "This is the most beautiful day of my Life".

In 1725 Baillet became president of the Privy Council of the Habsburg Netherlands, heading the civilian government of the Austrian Netherlands until his death. Here for he left Mechelen, and historic writing mention that the city was very sad to see him leave.

He died on 2 June 1732 in Brussels and was buried in the Carmelite convent, but his grave has not survived.

Government offices
Preceded by Jacques Stalins, Lord of Poppenrode	21st President of the Great Council; 1716-1725	Succeeded by Pierre-Primitive van Volden
Preceded by Albert de Coxie, Baron of Moorsele	18th President of the Privy Council; 1725-1732	Succeeded by Jean Alphonse, 1st Count de Coloma
