= Carla Walschap =

Belgian writer (1932–2026)

- Born: 20 December 1932; Antwerp, Belgium
- Died: 8 April 2026 (aged 93)
- Occupations: Teacher, writer

Carla Walschap (20 December 1932 – 8 April 2026) was a Belgian writer and a teacher. She was a daughter of the writer Gerard Walschap.

Walschap died on 8 April 2026, at the age of 93.

== Selected works ==
- Niet schreien, ouwe (1956)
- Het denneboompje dat niet tevreden was (1957)
- Hart om hart (1958)
- Rozen van Jericho (1963)
- De eskimo en de roos (1964)
- Meer suers dan soets (1977)

== See also ==
- Flemish literature
