= Diana Coloma =

Ecuadorian politician

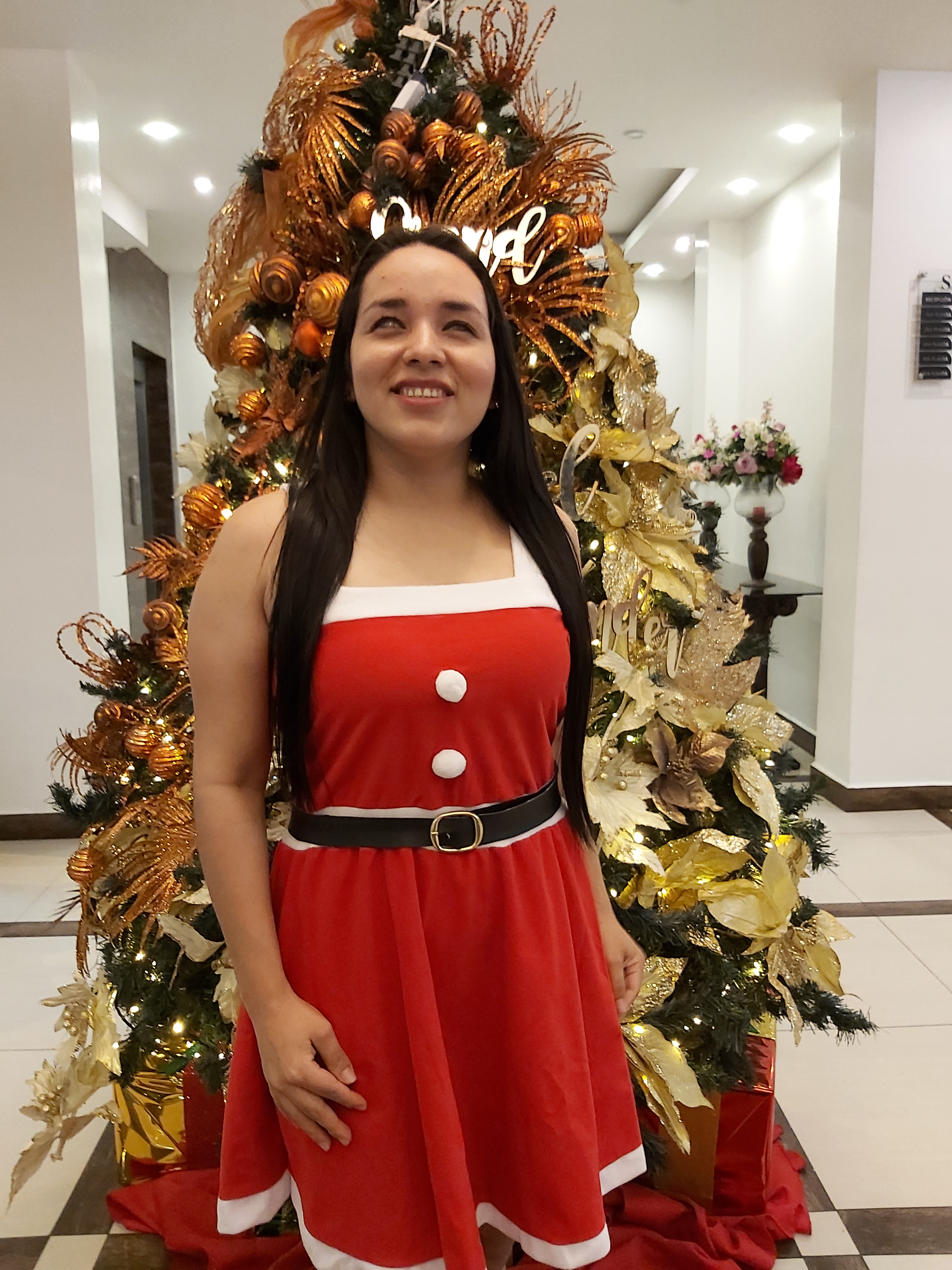
- in 2019
- Born: Diana Coloma Balseca c. 1993; Santo Domingo, Ecuador
- Occupation: Politician
- Known for: Blind councilor
- Children: 1

Diana Coloma (born c. 1993) is an Ecuadorian politician. She previously worked as a model prior to losing her sight. She has also been a beauty queen and a councilor.

== Life ==
Coloma was born in Santo Domingo and she became a beauty queen and a model. She was studying for a degree in law when she was 19. She was involved in a car accident that left her blind, after which she was depressed and tried to take her own life.

She became an activist in Santo Domingo de los Tsáchilas. She attracted attention by embarking on a three-day walk to Quito to draw attention to her demands.

In 2017 her party, Democratic Center, put her forward to be a member of the National Assembly as second on their list of candidates. She was not elected.

When she was 26 she was elected to be a Santo Domingo council member, becoming the first politician the city with sight disabilities. She had to have an assistant to help her to get to her office on the second storey; she saw the difficulties as a challenge and proof that change was required. She campaigns to create a university in her city and to improve accessibility. She noted that the existing laws needed to be made to be enforcable.

In 2022 improvements were made to her city's bus service as a subsidy was introduced that prevented a planned rise in ticket prices. Coloma was noted saying that the bus company needed to improve signage and to introduce traffic lights that made a sound for those with sight problems.

== Personal life ==
Coloma is married and has a child.
