= Meredith Coloma =

Canadian musician and luthier

Meredith Coloma is a Canadian musician and luthier from Vancouver.

Born in Vancouver, Coloma grew up in Canada, Chile and Taiwan. She attended the Lee Strasberg Institute in New York City. At just 16, she was touring as a professional musician and began to take note of how important the construction of the instruments was. By the time she turned 19, she had already apprenticed under professional luthiers, including Roger Sadowsky.

Coloma went on to start her own guitar-making business in Vancouver. She has earned recognition for entering the male-dominated field of guitar-making as a young, queer BIPOC woman. She is known for her handcrafted gypsy jazz guitars, mandolins, violins, ukuleles, acoustic guitars and electric guitars.

A singer-songwriter, Coloma was a finalist in the 2012 International Songwriting Competition in Nashville. She is a co-founder of the Vancouver International Guitar Festival.

== Boutique Builder ==
Coloma Guitars operates at a small scale, currently producing around ten guitars a month. After finding growth and success with the Freya model Coloma began having difficulty managing the responsibilities of a growing business. Coloma took a step back to assess the balance between her personal life and business in addition to managing rising customer demand. In order to meet this demand she had to drastically restructure how she was running her business. This meant hiring staff to meet the 180+ customers and counting that were on the waitlist.

Coloma Guitars specializes in creating guitars with unique designs while maintaining affordability, such as the Freya. Coloma describes the Freya as a boutique instrument (guitar) that is affordable for the working musician.
