= Baasrode =

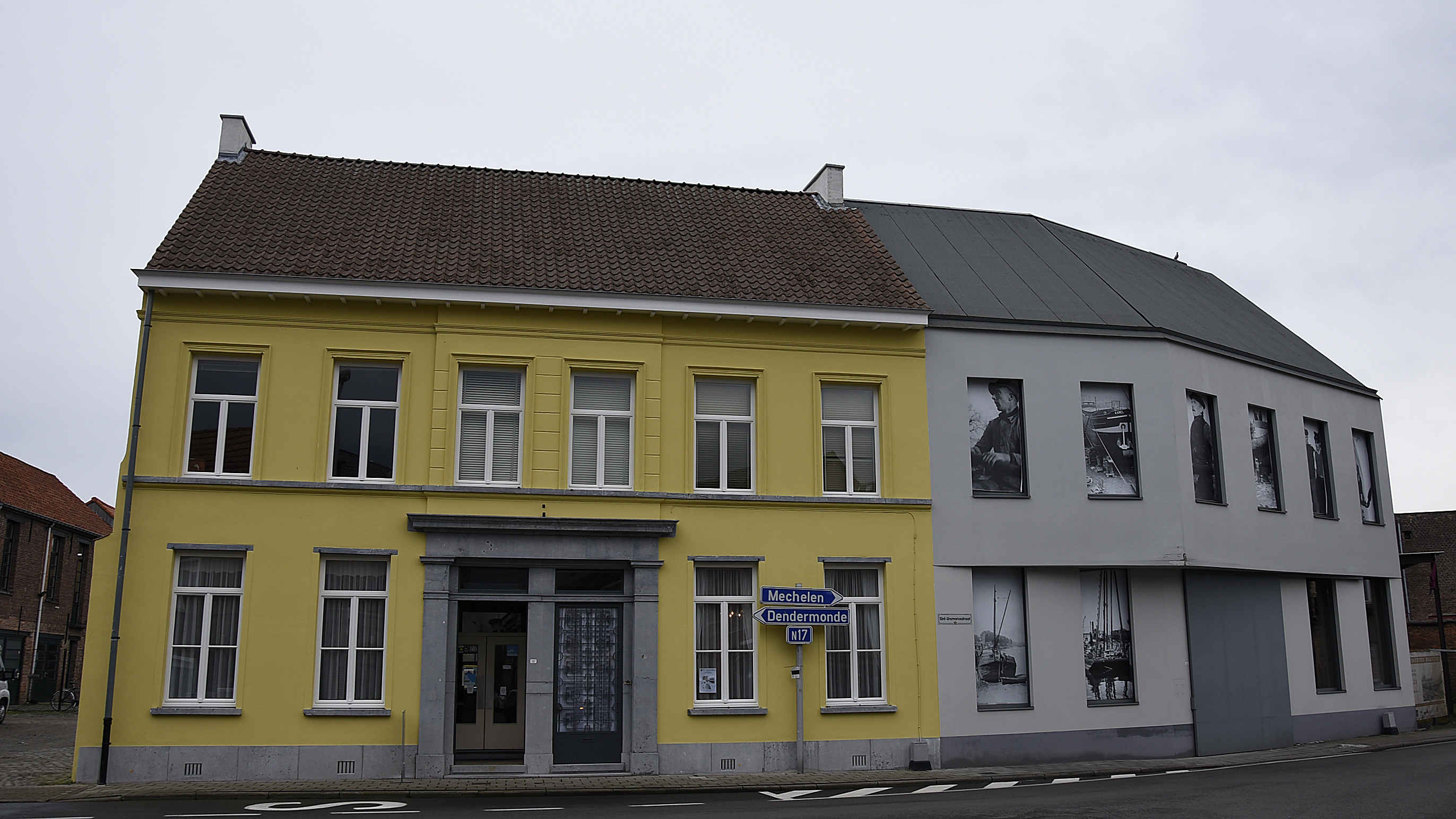
- The maritime museum in Baasrode

- Coat of arms

- Location within Belgium Location within Europe
- Coordinates: 51°02′15″N 04°09′43″E
- Country: Belgium
- Region: Flanders
- Province: East Flanders
- Municipality: Dendermonde

Baasrode is a village and a subdivision of the municipality of Dendermonde, in East Flanders, Belgium.

Since the Middle Ages, the village economy has been based on riverine traffic on the Scheldt. A boat building industry remained active until 1986, and the village is home to the Scheepvaartmuseum, a museum dedicated to its maritime history. The village church, dedicated to Saint Ursmar, is medieval but has been successively rebuilt during the 18th and 19th centuries.

The sub-municipality of Baasrode includes the village of Baasrode, the village of Vlassenbroek and the hamlet Briel.

== History ==
The oldest mention of Baasrode dates back to 822 when it was called Baceroth. In later mentions the names Bascerode, Baserode, Basserode, Bacerode and Baesrode were used. The original Baceroth-domain included present-day Sint-Amands and Mariekerke.

In the 14th century Baasrode acquired stapelrecht. In 1465 Philip the Good visited Baasrode, a testament to the village growing importance at that time. By 1540 the Baasrode harbor had out competed the harbor of the neighboring city of Dendermonde in regards to trade by river with the city of Antwerp. This resulted in a legal procedure by the city of Dendermonde and a subsequent grant of privilege centralizing most of the trade in the region in the city of Dendermonde.

In 1545 Baasrode was almost completely burned to the ground by Spanish troops. Thirteen years later, in 1558, Baasrode was once again destroyed by fire. In 1567 the village church was ransacked during the Beeldenstorm, but the village itself remained largely intact. On August 14th 1579 however the village was almost completely destroyed when Spanish troops under the command of Philip, Count of Egmont, tried to capture William of Orange who was staying overnight in Baasrode. By 1580 fewer than 50 families remained in Baasrode.

In the first half of the 17th century the population grew rapidly as the harbor was rebuilt and trade returned. By the end of the century Baasrode had lost its importance as a trade center. In the 18th century the shipyards became central to the local economy. In 1777 shipyard Van Praet was founded. Initially these shipyards produced small riverboats but soon after they started building frigates, coasters and seagoing fishing boats. Baasrode became one of the main shipbuilding centers in the Southern Netherlands.

Fishermen and traders from Baasrode started to specialize in the transportation of eels caught by Dutch fishermen and sold in the south of the Netherlands. They used a special type of boat, a "botter". These botters had a perforated hull and a compartment filled with water that enabled the traders to transport the eels while still alive. Once arrived in Baasrode, these live eels were put into wicker baskets filled with wet grass and transported by road to the market in Brussels. This eel trade remained an important economic activity in Baasrode until the early 20th century when heavy pollution of the river Scheldt made the transportation of live eels by botter impossible.

== Notable people ==
- Danny Veyt, soccer player.
- Frans Bonduel, cyclist
- Silke Van Avermaet, volleybal player
