= Jan Hammenecker =

Jan Hammenecker (Mariekerke, 2 October 1878-Westrode, 13 June 1932) was a Flemish Roman Catholic priest and writer. One of his pupils was Gerard Walschap.

== Bibliography ==
- Verzen (1908)
- Van Christus' apostelen (1913)
- Oorlogsgetijden (?)
- Zoo zuiver als een ooge (heiligenleven, 1918)
- Gebeden voor het H. Hart (1919)
- Voor een ziel (1922)
- Colloquia I (1923)
- Excubiae (1926)
- Colloquia II (1929)
- Bloemlezing uit zijn werk (1934)

== See also ==
- Flemish literature

== Sources ==
- Jan Hammenecker
- Jan Hammenecker
- Jan Hammenecker-monument (located in Klein-Brabant)
