= Coloma family =

Spanish noble house

(de) Coloma
- noble family
- Country: Spanish Netherlands Austrian Netherlands
- Founder: Juan I Coloma, 1st Lord of Alfajarin
- Titles: Marquesses of Espinar; Marquesses of Noguera; Marquesses of Canales de Chozas; Counts of Bornhem; Counts of Elda; Baron of St-Pieters Leeuw; Lords of Alfajarin; Lords of Bodabilla
- Estates: Coloma Castle; Bornem Castle; Moriensart Castle

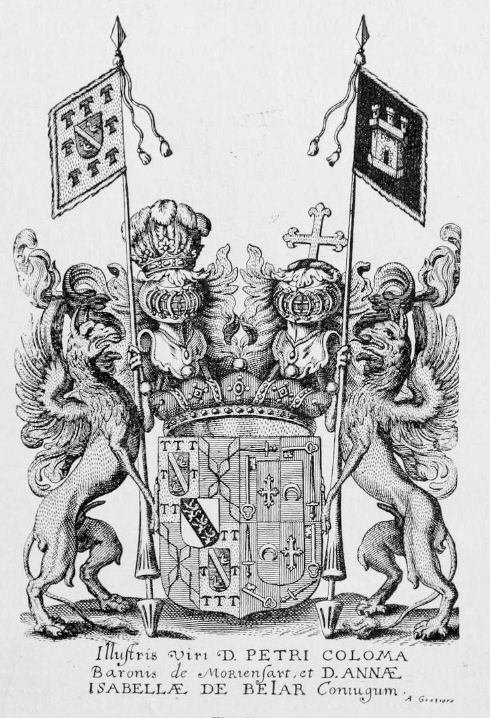
Crest

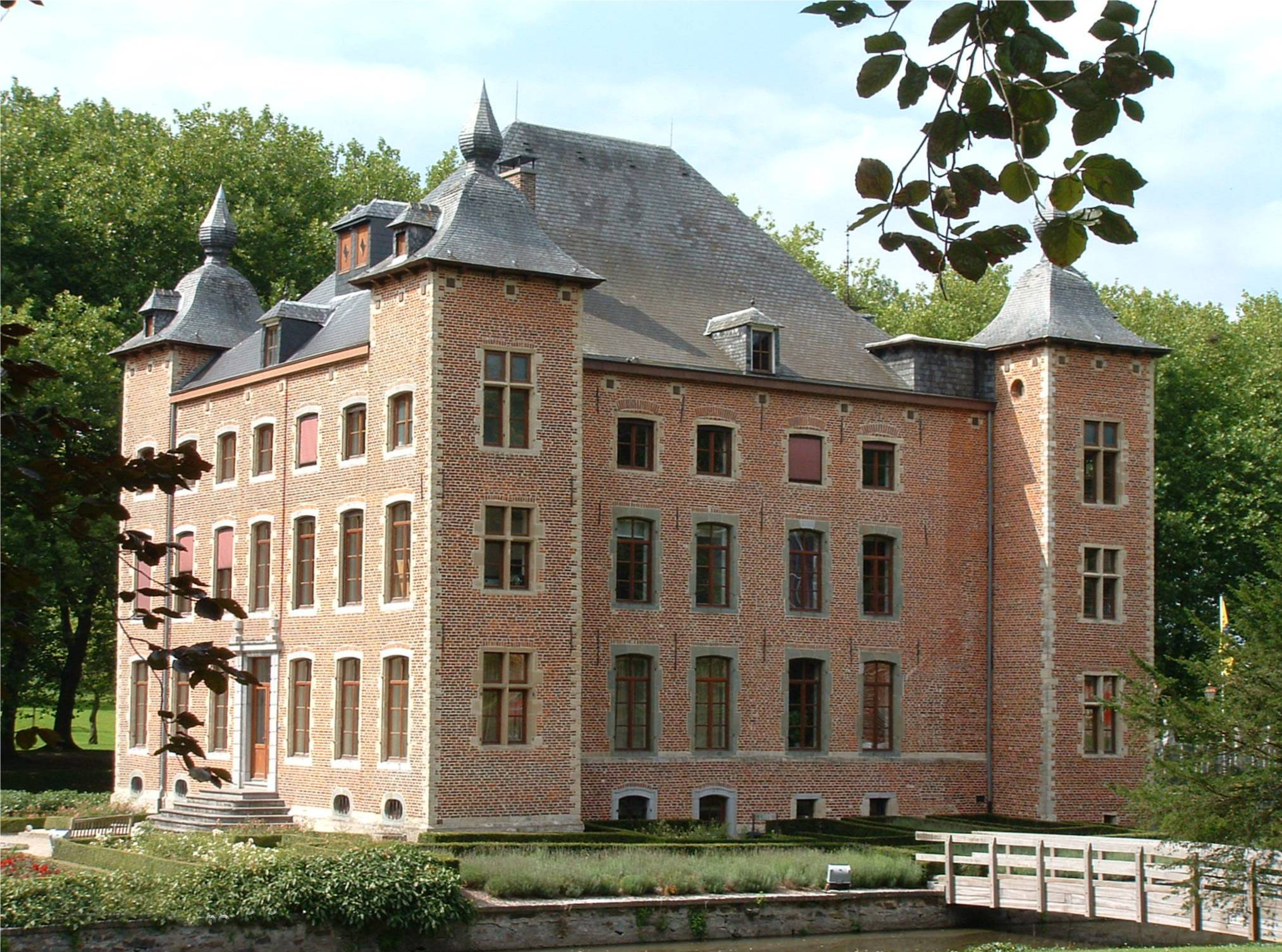
Coloma castle in Flanders

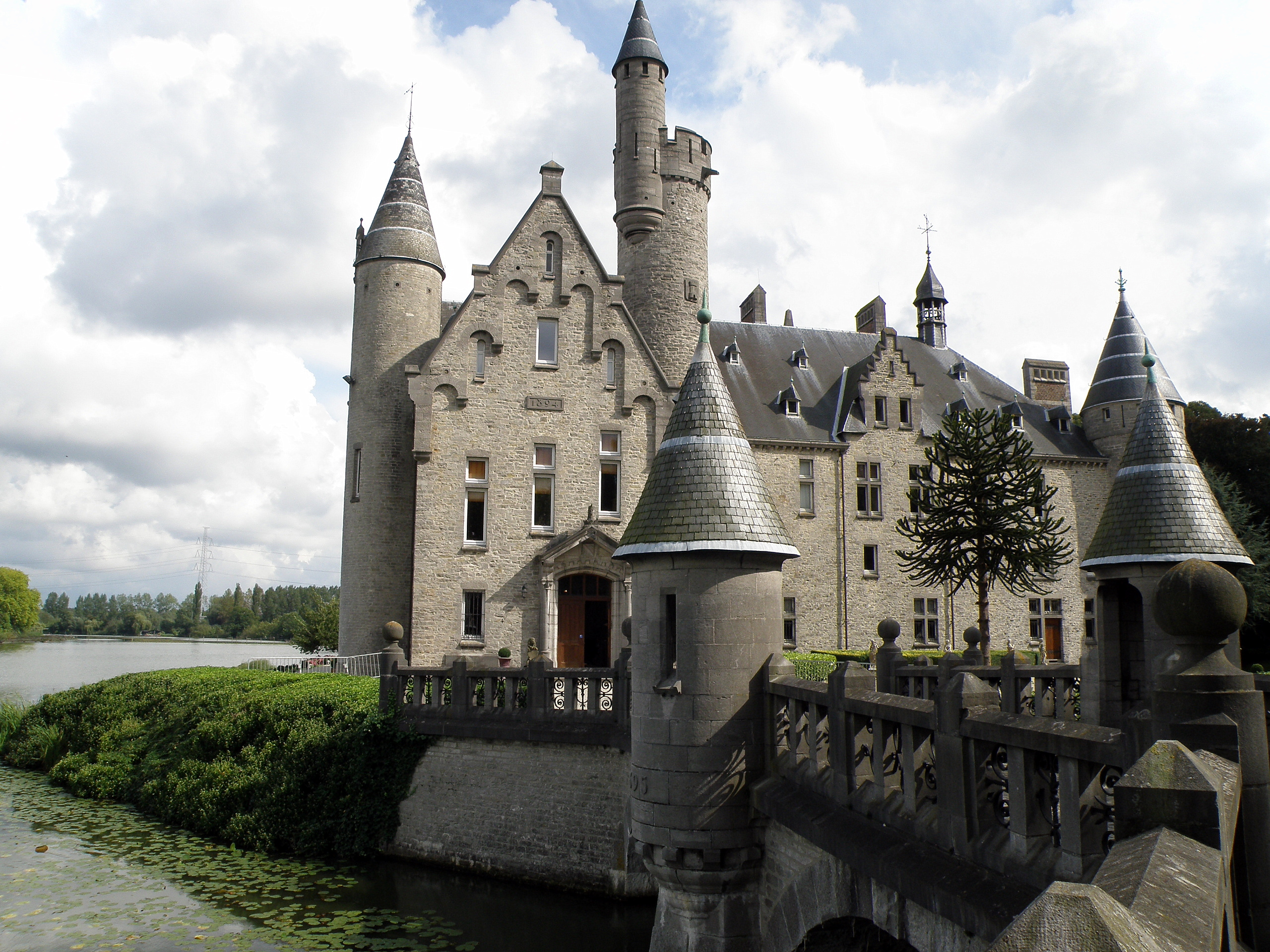
Bornem Castle

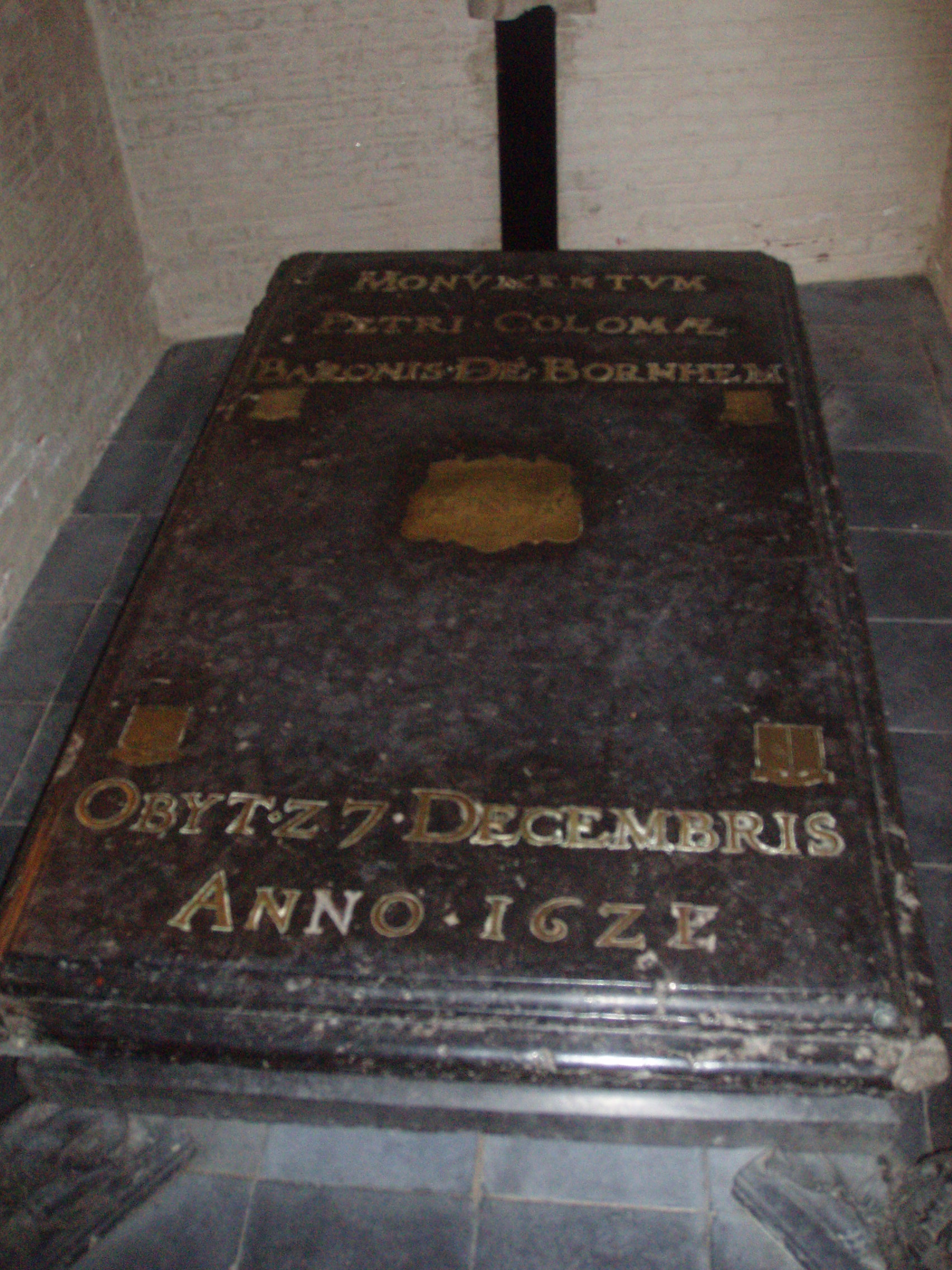
Grave of Piedro Coloma, 3rd Baron of Bornhem, church of Bornem

Coloma or de Coloma or Colomba is an old important Spanish Noble House. A branch belongs to the Flemish nobility, and became the Counts of Bornhem. Other branches became the Counts of Elda, Marquesses of Espinar, Marquesses of Noguera and Marquesses of Canales de Chozas.

== History ==
The origin is going back to Don Pedro de Coloma and his wife dona Maria de Cardona. Pedro was esquire of Gaston, count of Carcasonnes. He left France and settled in Catalonia, and was called Coloma (a female pigeon, in Catalan), from the French Colombe.

His descendants made military careers in service of the Kings of Aragon. Gaston I de Coloma was rewarded the Order of Montesa. Other early members like Francisco Coloma fought against the moriscos in Mallorca. Juan I de Coloma left Catalonia and went to Borja, he received by royal grace of John II of Aragon and Navarre the Seigneury of Alfajarin in 1467. Here his eldest son, (from the second marriage) don Juan II de Coloma, became 1st Lord of Elda in Valencia, together with Salinas and Petrer. His descendants lived in Zaragossa, La Rioja and Burgos: they and spread in the empire. The married to important families like Croy and de Borja. It is believed that a branch is still alive, probably don Francisco Coloma y Gallegos, died 1993, who was minister of Franco had six children.

The Flemish branch that came out Spain with Farnese lived in Bornem, Gent, Brussels and Mechelen. They had important careers and functions in the society of the Austrian Empire. In Mechelen and Bornem they left important heritage and monuments. The Flemish branch has become extinct.

== Genealogy ==
=== Descendants of Juan I ===
1. don Juan I Coloma, 1st Lord of Alfajarin: married 1st to doña blanca Fernandez de Luna, 2nd to doña Juana de Herredia.
  1. don Juan II Coloma, died 1517: 2nd Lord of Alfajarin, 1st Lord of Elda, Salinas and Petrer: royal secretary of king Juan II and King Ferdinand of Aragon. Marr. doña Maria Calvillo, Baroness of Malon.
    1. don Juan III Francisco Coloma: 3rd Lord of Alfajarin, 2nd Lord of Elda, Salinas and Petrer, marr. 1st doña Maria de Cardona; 2nd Catherina de Cardona.
      1. don Juan IV Coloma: 1st Count of Elda: Viceroy of Sardina, Ambassador in France. Marr. doña Aldonca de Aragon. 2nd Elisabeth de Saa.
      2. don Pedro I de Coloma, Lord of Malon: marr. to Maria de Luna
        1. don Francisco de Coloma, died without heirs.
        2. don Pedro II de Coloma, Lord of Malon: mar. Maria de Aragon
        3. don Juan de Coloma: Took vows
        4. don Agnes de Coloma, marr. Don León de Garro y Javier.
      3. don Carlos I de Coloma
        1. don Geronimo de Coloma, marr.dona Petron de Tovar y Barcena
      4. doña Blanca de Coloma, marr don Juan Alonso de Milan-Aragon.
        1. don Christobal de Milan-Aragon, 1st Marquess of Albayda: marr. doña Franscisca de Borja.
      5. don Enrique de Coloma.
    2. don Juan Pedro Coloma
  2. don Francisco I Coloma, named "Veedor" Knight of St James: Marr. 1st Teresa de Avila, 2nd Lucrecia del Balzo, Lady of Sicilia.
    1. don Juan VII de Coloma: Marr. Teresia de Sarnento

=== descendants of don Juan IV Coloma, 1st Count of Elda ===
1. don Juan IV, 1st Count of Elda
  1. don Luis I Antonio Coloma, 2nd Count of Elda: Knight of Santiago, Vice roy de Sardinia. Marr. doña Juana Henriques de Mendoza
    1. don Juan V Coloma, 3rd Count of Elda: knight of Santiago, Lord of the Chamber of Felipe III.
      1. don Juan VI Andres Coloma, 4th Count of Elda, 2nd Marquess of Noguera: marr. doña Isabella Pujades y Borja, 2nd Countess of Ana.
      2. don Carlos III Coloma: Archdeacon of xativa.
    2. don Antonio I Coloma: 1st MArquess of Noguera, Canon in Toledo Cathedral. his nephew became the 2nd Marquess after his death.
    3. don Isabella Coloma: Lady of Queen Margharita, marr. don Juan de Leca.
  2. don Alfonso Coloma: bishop of Barcelona.
  3. don Franscisco II Coloma: Knight of Malta
  4. don Diego Coloma: Canon at Valnecia Cathedral.
  5. don Luis Coloma
  6. doña Maria, marr. Don Pedro de Zuniga.
  7. doña Isabella Coloma
  8. doña Guyomara Coloma
  9. doña Ana Coloma
  10. doña Blanca Coloma
  11. don Carlos II de Coloma, died 1637: knight of Santiago, created 1st Marquess of Espinar, Governor of Cambrai. Marr. Marguerite de (Gavere) Liedekerke
    1. don Antonio de Coloma
    2. don Carlos IV Ignatio de Coloma
    3. don Antonio de Coloma
    4. dona Maria de Coloma, marr. don Nicolas de Velsaco.
    5. doña Jeronima de Coloma
    6. doña Juana de Coloma
    7. doña Margaritavde Coloma
    8. doña Isabella de Coloma
    9. doña Blanca de Coloma
    10. doña Luisa de Coloma
  12. doña Juana Coloma
  13. doña Luisa Coloma

=== descendants of don Juan VI Andres Coloma, 4th Count of Elda ===
1. don Juan VI Andres Coloma, 4th Count of Elda
  1. don Antonio II Coloma, 3rd Count of Ana: died without heirs
  2. don Francisco III Coloma, 5th Count of Elda, 4th Count of Ana: died 1712: Grandee of Spain, marr. doña Mariana de la Cerda.
    1. don Francisco IV Coloma, 6th Count of Elda, 4th Count of Ana, 4th Marquess of Noguera: Grandee of Spain. Last direct heir of Elda.
  3. don Jose Coloma, 3rd Marquess of Noguera: died in Vienna, 1721.
  4. doña Maria Emannuela Coloma: Lady of Queen Maria Anna of Spain. Marr. don Juan Arias de Bobadilla, 4th Count of Punto, governor of Ceuta.
    1. don Gonzalo Jose Arias y Coloma, 7th Count of Elda, 6th Count of Ana, 5th Marques of Noguera. Married Marie Therese de Croy, daughter of Ferdinand, Duke of Croy-Havre.
  5. doña Guiomar Coloma: marr. Jose de Castelvi, 1st Marquess of Villatorcas.

=== descendants of don Juan VII Coloma ===
1. don Juan VII Coloma, marr. Teresia de Sarmiento y Sotomayor
  1. don Juan VIII Coloma, Knight of Santiago: Marr. doña Maria Fernadez, Lady of Bobadilla.
    1. don Juan IX Coloma, 1st Baron of Bornhem, Lord of Bobadilla: Marr. Joanne, Viscountess de Dourlens. Descendant became Lords of Bornhem in Flanders.
    2. don Diego Francisco Coloma
    3. doña Elvira Coloma, marr. don Juan de Bustamante
  2. don Marco Coloma: died without heirs.
  3. doña Barbara Coloma, marr. don Juan de Sevilla.
  4. doña Teresa Coloma, marr. Don Diego Maldonado

=== the Flemish Branch of Coloma de Bornhem ===
Don Juan IX Coloma, Lord of Bobadilla:
Knight of Santiago, Marr. Doña Maria Fernadez, Lady of Bodabilla.

  1. Don Pedro Coloma, Baron of Bornhem, died 1621; marr. Jeanne l'Escuyer, Viscountess of Dourlens
    1. Don Alejandro Coloma, Baron of Bornhem, died 1625:
      baptised in the cathedral of Antwerp: godson of Alexander, duke of Parma.
    2. Don Diego Coloma,
    3. Don Pierre Coloma, Viscount of Dourlens, Viscount of Dourlens: Marr. Cornelia de Vos-Pollaer, lady of Beaupre.
      1. Jean-François Coloma, 1st Count of Bornhem: marr. Marie Therese d'Ongnys de Coupigny.
        1. Marie Françoise Coloma, marr. Ignace-Philippe de Lannoy, 3rd Count of Beaurepiare:
          Marr. Margerethe de Clermont-Tonnere.
          1. François Joseph Louis de Lannoy, Count of Beaurepaire: marr. Alix de St Vaast.
          2. Claude François Ignace de Lannoy, Knight of St Lazare in 1717.
          3. Adrien François Joseph de Lannoy, Knight if St Lazare.
          4. Aldegonde Eleonore de Lannoy; Lady of Bornem: marr. Baudry Adelbert de Marnix, Baron of Rollecourt:
            Heirs of Bornem Castle.
          5. Claude-François de Marnix, Baron of Rollencourt: Married to Marie-Ghislaine de Cunchy.
          6. Charles-Ghislain, Count de Marnix, ( 1780-1832): Line continuous upon today.
        2. François Claude Coloma, 2nd Count of Bornhem: Marr. Marie Therese Bette, daughter of Ambroise Auguste de Bette, 2nd Marquess of Lede.
        3. Charles Joseph François Coloma, 3rd Count of Bornhem, died 1724.
        4. Marie Florence Coloma, 4th Countess of Bornhem: last heir, married to Jean-Jacques, Count of Corswarem-Looz.
      2. Pierre Coloma, 1st Baron of Moriensart, died 1676 : marr. Anne Elisabeth de Bejar, Lady of Westackerre.
        1. Jean Pierre Coloma, 2nd Baron of Moriensart, (1670–1714): Marr. Marie Claire de Romree, Lady of the Starry cross.
          1. Rosa Alexandra Coloma, marr. Nicolas vander Dilft, Lord Mayor of Brussels.
        2. Jean-Alphonses, 1st Count Coloma: see further.
    4. Don Juan Coloma, (1588–1644): Protonotary Apostolic.
    5. Doña Francisca Coloma, buried in Bornem.
    6. Doña Eleonra Coloma, buried in Bornem.
    7. Don Jaime Coloma, (1595–1639): Lord of Bodabilla

==== Descendants of Jean-Alphonse, 1st Count Coloma ====
Jean Alphonse, 1st Count de Coloma, (1677–1739); Count Coloma in 1728:
member of the Great Council of Mechelen and president of the Privy Council of the Habsburg Netherlands. Marr Barbe le Poyvre.

  1. Pierre Alphonse Livin, 2nd Count Coloma. Marr Agathe van der Laan.
  2. François Theodore Louis Coloma: died in the Battle of Guastalla, 1734.
  3. Barbe Therese de Coloma.
  4. Jean Baptiste de Coloma.
  5. Maria Barbara Coloma.
  6. Vitalis Joseph de Coloma.
  7. Barbe Norbertina de Coloma.
  8. Charles Vital Alexandre de Coloma, (1718–1758):
    Honorary Lord Chamberlain of the Duke of Lorraine. Marr. Eugenie Francois Roose, Lady of St-Pieters Leeuw.
    1. Jean Ernest Coloma, Baron of St-Pieters Leeuw, last male heir who died in 1825.

=== Branch of la Rioja ===
1. don Pedro Coloma y Nobajas: Royal Secretary of Felipe IV, Knight of Santiago, married to doña Mariana Escolano y Ledesma.
  1. don Pedro Coloma y Escolano, died 1692: 1st Marques of Canales de Chozas: married to doña Ana de Tapia y Zúñiga
    1. doña Marianna Coloma y Tapia.
  2. don Diego Coloma y Escolano, born 1636.
  3. don Emmanuel Coloma y Escolano (Manuel), (1637–1713): 2nd Marquess of Canales de Chozas,
    married to Maximilienne Dorothea t'Serclaes, daughter of Jean, Count de t' Serclaes de Tilly.
    1. doña Maria Teresa Coloma, 3rd Marquessa of Canales de Chozas.
  4. doña Maria Doria Coloma y Escolano, 1638:
  5. doña Catalina Coloma y Escolano, 1638.
  6. doña Isidora Coloma y Escolano, 1641:
  7. don Balthasar Coloma y Escolano, 1642:
  8. don Eugenio Martin Coloma y Escolano, (1649–1697): Composer
  9. don Vincente Augustin Coloma y Escolano, 1651.
  10. don Francisco Antonio Coloma y Escolano, 1653.
2. don Francisco Coloma y Maceda, (1617-1677): Marquess of Canales de Chozas, 28th Governor-General of the Philippines. Married María de Cuellar y Cisneros.

== Others ==
- don Julio Coloma y Gallegos, born 1907: Capitain-General, de brigada y infanteria.
- don Francisco Coloma y Gallegos, born 1912: minister of Franco, marr. doña Mercedes de Picón y Agero, Marquesa of Seone.
