= Francisco Coloma y Maceda =

28th Governor-General of the Philippines
- In office 11 April 1677 – 25 September 1677
- Monarchs: Philip IV of Spain; Charles II of Spain
- Governor: (Viceroy of New Spain); Payo Enríquez de Rivera
- Preceded by: Manuel de León
- Succeeded by: Francisco Sotomayor y Mansilla

Personal details
- Born: 1617 Navarrete, La Rioja, Spain
- Died: 25 September 1677 (aged 59–60) Manila, Captaincy General of the Philippines
- Resting place: Santo Domingo Church
- Profession: oidor
- Awards: Order of Calatrava; Order of Santiago

Francisco Coloma y Maceda, Marqués of Canales de Chozas (1617 – 25 September 1677) was a Spanish oidor and licentiate who served as the 29th governor-general of the Philippines. He is the fifth governor-general of the Philippines from the Real Audiencia of Manila. Prior to being governor, Coloma served as senior auditor (oidor) in charge of military affairs during the administrations of Governor-General Diego de Salcedo to Manuel de León.

== Career ==
Little is known about the early life of Coloma, who was born in the La Rioja branch of the House of Coloma in 1617. He was a licentiate when he arrived in the Philippines on 29 March 1661 to serve as oidor (auditor) in the Real Audiencia. On 22 June 1662, Coloma married María de Cuellar y Cisneros in the Philippines. During the administrations of Governor-General Diego de Salcedo to Manuel de León, Coloma held the position of senior auditor. As senior auditor, Coloma was in charge of military affairs. This position was challenged by Francisco Sotomayor y Mansilla, who was also part of the Real Audiencia, arguing that he was supposed to be the senior auditor. However, in fear of Salcedo, Sotomayor gave in to Coloma and assumed the second highest position.

When a coup replaced Salcedo with Juan Manuel de la Peña Bonifaz on 28 September 1668, the new administration had Sotomayor and the rest of the members of the Real Audiencia locked up outside Manila. The new governor and his associates seized Salcedo's fortune of 14,000 pesos and the situado brought by the Manila galleon amounting to 400,000 pesos for themselves. To circumvent the threat of Sotomayor, he was exiled from Cavite to Oton, Iloilo, on 30 December 1668. While Coloma remained in the city, the associates of de la Peña terrorized his wife so that he could not act on the matter. Meanwhile, the governor appointed two licentiates, Juan de Rosales and Eugenio Gutierrez de Mendoza, to decide on the seniority of Coloma and Sotomayor. However, it was beyond the knowledge of de la Peña that King Charles II of Spain already appointed a new governor on 24 June 1668. He arrived in the Philippines by July 1669, and when he took office in Manila on 24 September of the same year, he put all those involved in the coup to trial.

In 1670, he presided over the residencia of Salcedo, which was delayed by the coup two years ago. However, a protest was filed to the Council of the Indies regarding this review. Since he was senior auditor during the Salcedo administration, he was also the governor's asesor (legal adviser). All advice on the governor's acts came from Coloma. In essence, he would be reviewing his own acts. In 1671, Coloma's appointment to take the residencia was cancelled and Sotomayor took over Salcedo's residencia. As for Salcedo, he died while being transported to Mexico for trial.

Coloma was with Governor de León when the latter went to the convent of Tondo, Manila, with full military display. This was done to influence the election of the provincial superior in the area, of which the leading candidate (Francisco de Medina Basco) was not in good terms with de León. While still in the Philippines, his wife died. The governor, then suffering from obesity, visited the funeral of Coloma's wife. However, the smell of buried corpses made de León's condition worse. Soon enough, his wounds reopened and he died of hemorrhage on 11 April 1677. On the same day, Coloma, then presiding over the Real Audiencia of Manila as senior auditor, succeeded as governor-general. One of the first acts of the Coloma administration was the disposition of de León's estate, which amounted to 250,000 pesos. All of the former governor's fortune was allotted to charity, including 50,000 pesos for the Misericordia, 33,000 pesos for the founding of chaplaincies, 12,000 pesos for the rebuilding of San Lazaro Hospital in Santa Cruz, Manila, and another 12,000 pesos for rebuilding the seminary in Santa Potenciana. In 1668, eight thousand pesos were brought to New Spain but it was from the vandala of the rice production of Pampanga. The Kapampangan people appealed to Coloma for help, and in a landmark decision, the entire eight thousand pesos were returned to the people.

== Death ==
On 25 September 1677, Coloma died and was buried in Santo Domingo Church. He was succeeded by Sotomayor. Up to this day, remains of Coloma's shield and coat of arms can be seen in Navarrete, La Rioja, with the following inscription: ESTAS ARMAS SON DE FRANCISCO COLOMA, VIRREY Y CAPITAN GENERAL DE MANILA (This is the coat of arms of Francisco Coloma, Viceroy and Captain General of Manila). With no apparent heir, his will was carried out with money from his nephew, Pedro Coloma y Escalona, Marqués of Canales de Chozas, marrie to married to Ana de Tapia y Zúñiga. In 1675, two years prior to his death, Coloma's estate had been partitioned as follows:

- 12,000 pesos for Jerónimo Campusano and his wife Juana de Cuadros
- 5,362 pesos to Nicolás de Merlo
- 5,085 pesos and jewelry to Doña Ana María Campusano
- 3,474 pesos for funeral expenses
- 1,424 pesos for payment of debts to Diego de Heredia, Pedro Roldán, and Joseph de Alecha
- 12,000 pesos and gold for Coloma's tomb

Preceded by Manuel de León	Governor General of the Philippines; 1677	Succeeded by Francisco de Montemayor y Mansilla
