= Pierre Coloma, Viscount of Dourlens =

Flemish Noble Lord

Pierre Coloma (1587–1656), Baron of Bornhem, Viscount of Dourlens and Lord of Brestel, Terna, Allennes, Moriensart and Seroulx, was a Flemish noble lord and member of the famous House of Coloma.

He was born to Pedro Coloma, Baron of Bornhem (died 1621), and Jeanne l'Escuyer, Viscountess of Dourlens (died 1645). He was baptised in Brussels Minster, with the Count of Mansfeld as godfather. He inherited the title baron of Bornhem from his elder brother, Alexander, who died childless in 1625, and that of viscount of Dourlens from his mother, at her death in 1645.

On 11 October 1629 he married Cornélie de Vos (died 1636), lady of Beaupré, Hamme and Hendercordel, who was the daughter of Pierre de Vos, knight, and Catherine Cabillau, lady of Ham. They had two sons: Jean-François and Pierre.

In 1646, 1647 and 1649 Coloma was royal commissioner for the renewal of the magistracies of Flanders. He died on 9 October 1656.
