= Pedro Coloma, Baron of Bornhem =

Spanish officer in the Army of Flanders

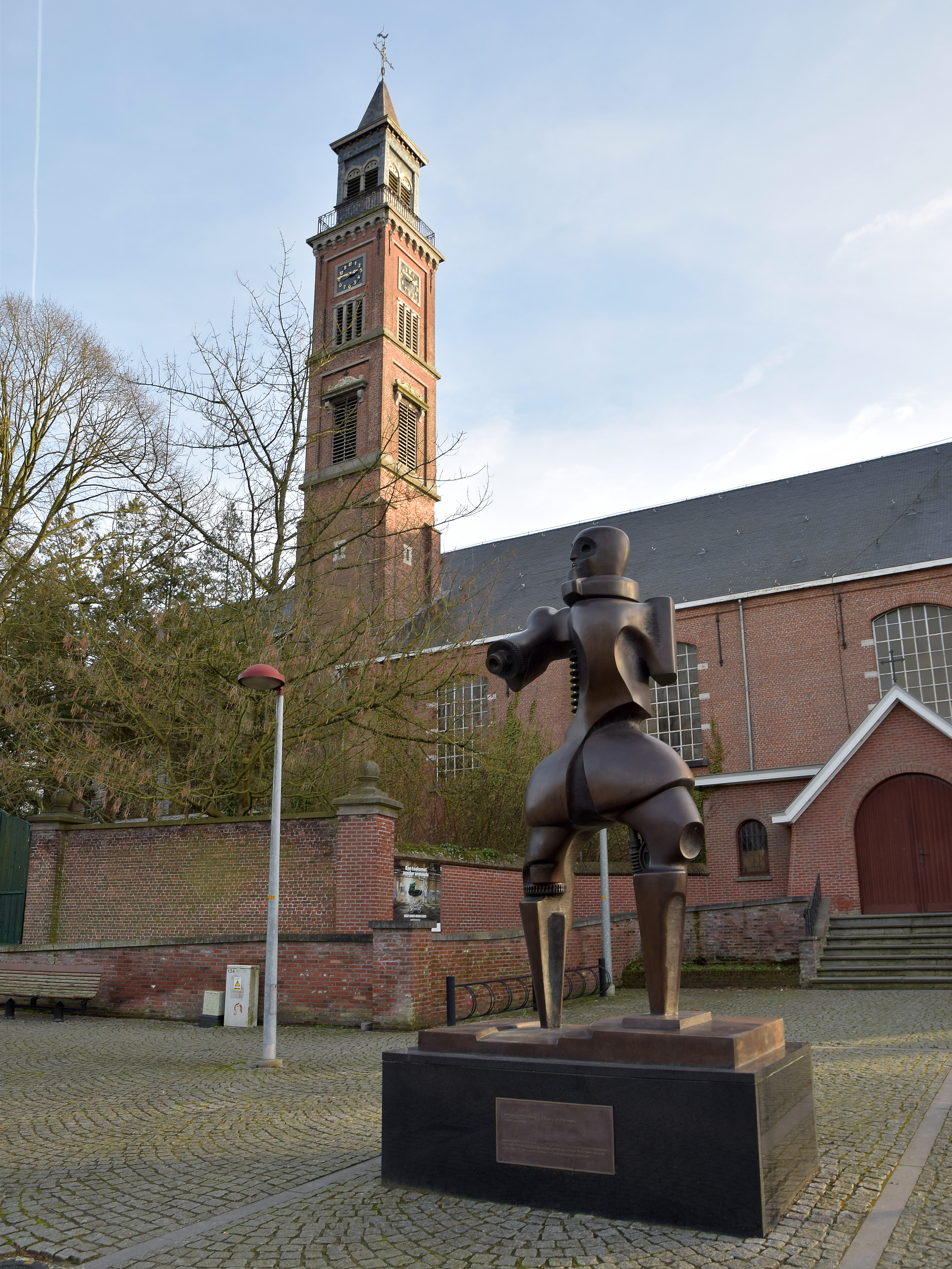
Statue of Pedro Coloma in front of Bornem Abbey

Don Pedro Coloma (1556–1621), Baron of Bornhem (currently Bornem) and Lord of Bobadilla, was a Spanish nobleman and an officer in the Army of Flanders, who established a branch of the House of Coloma in the Habsburg Netherlands.

== Family ==
Coloma was born in Nájera on 16 August 1556, the son of Juan Coloma, a knight in the Order of Santiago, and Doña Maria Fernandez, Lady of Bobadilla. In 1585 he married Jeanne l'Escuyer, Viscountess of Dourlens (currently Doullens), with whom he had three sons: Alexander, a captain of light cavalry, who succeeded him but died childless in 1625; Diego, who served as a gentleman in the household of Philip III of Spain; and Pierre, who continued the line.

== Career ==
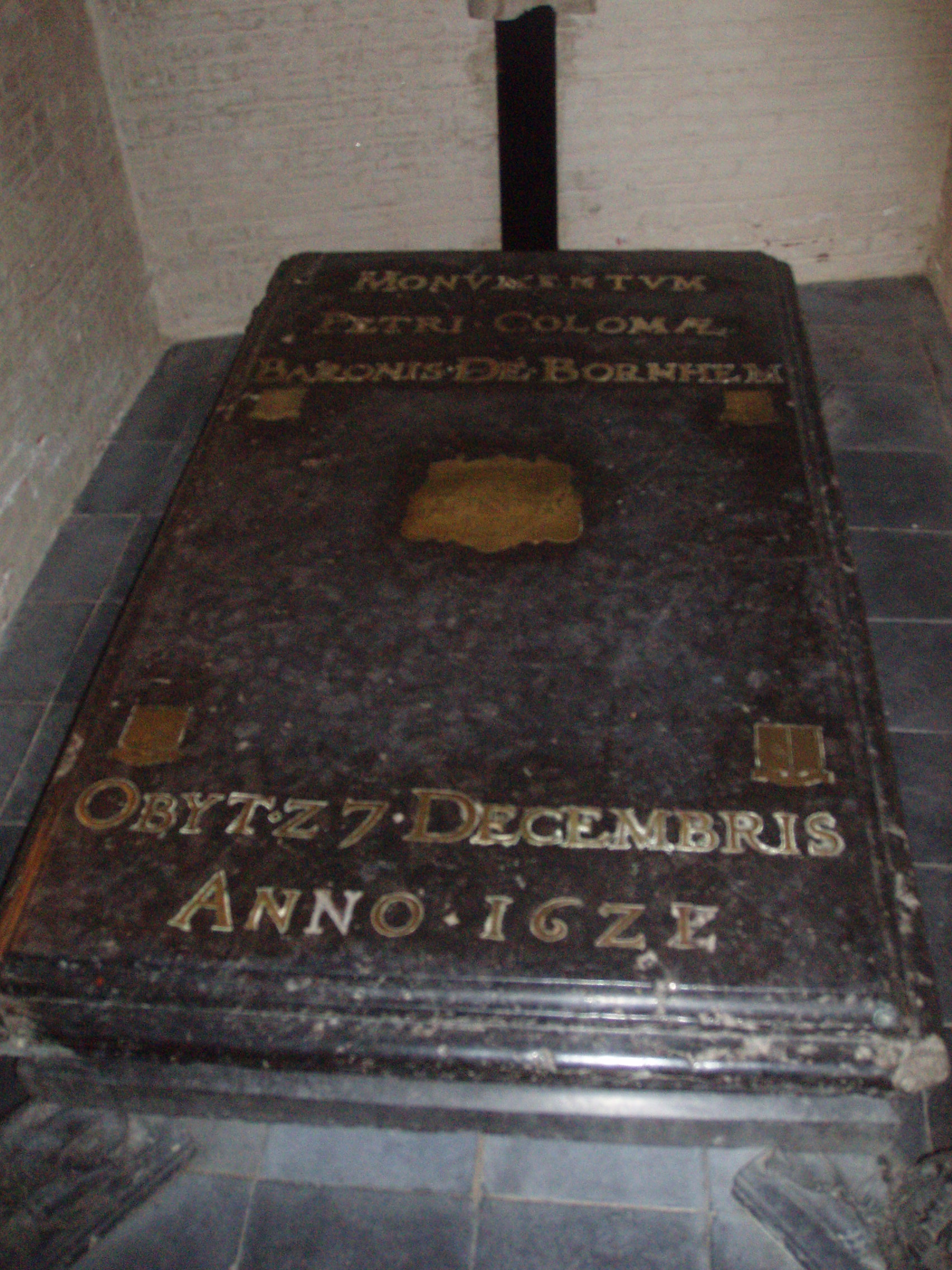
Tombstone in Bornem church

Coloma arrived in the Low Countries in 1577, to fight against the Dutch Revolt, and in 1586 bought the lordship of Bornhem in Flanders. He built a manor house on the site of Bornem Castle. He also restored and improved the medieval duck decoy on the estate, and in 1603 founded a religious community that is now Bornem Abbey.

He died in Brussels on 27 December 1621 and was buried in Bornem.
