= 1603 in Belgium =

- Decades
- See also: Other events of 1603; List of years in Belgium

Jan Brueghel the Elder, Village with windmill, 1603 or 1605

Events in the year 1603 in the Spanish Netherlands and Prince-bishopric of Liège (predecessor states of modern Belgium).

== Incumbents ==
=== Habsburg Netherlands ===
Sovereigns – Archdukes Albert and Isabella

=== Prince-Bishopric of Liège ===
Prince-Bishop – Ernest of Bavaria

== Events ==
- 2 March – Apostolic indulgences of the jubilee exceptionally obtainable in Brussels Minster
- 5 April – Archduke Albert writes to Philip III of Spain that he is sending an ambassador to England to congratulate James VI of Scotland on his succession.
- 26 May – Battle of Sluis fought at sea.

== Art and architecture ==
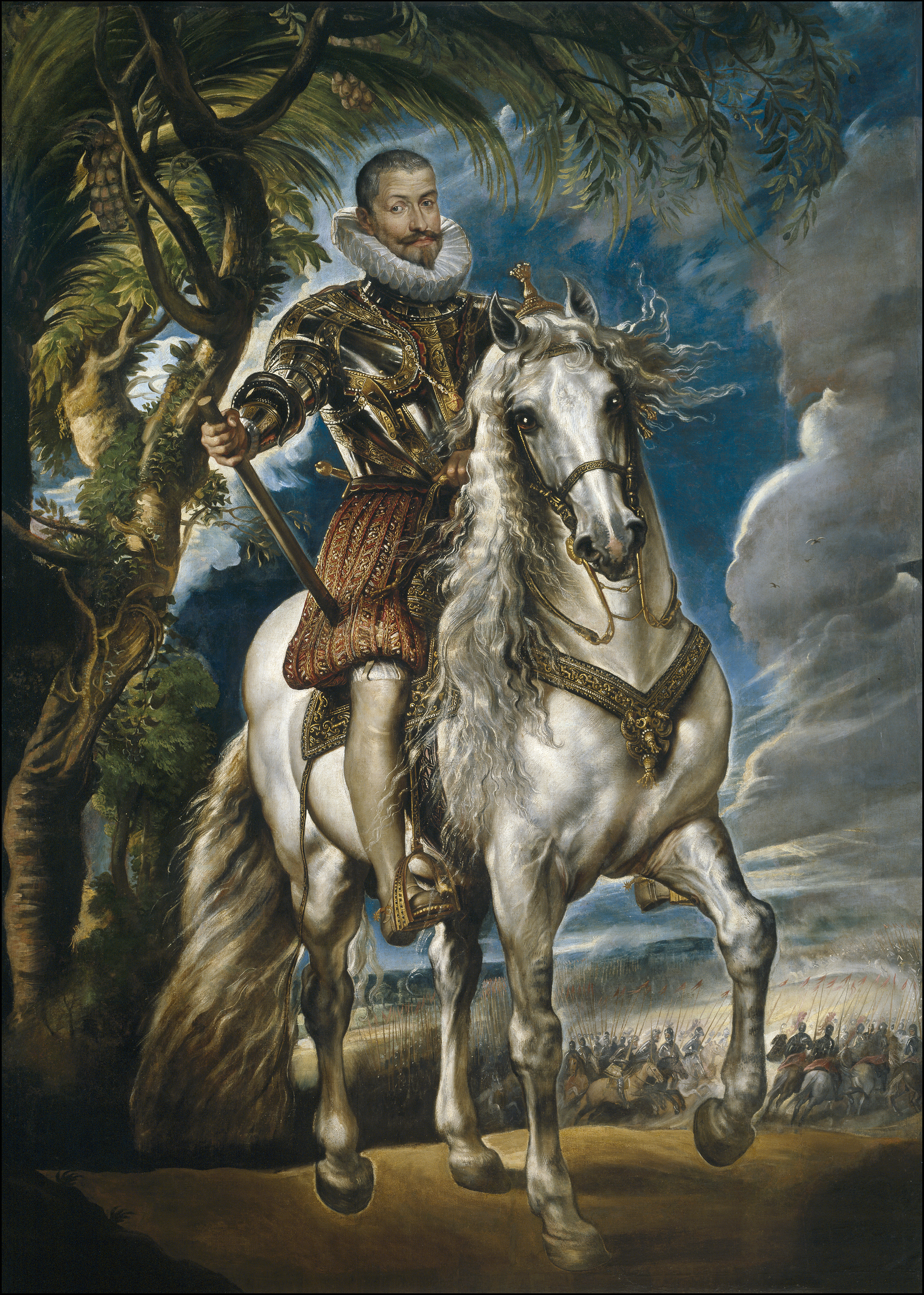
Peter Paul Rubens, Equestrian Portrait of the Duke of Lerma, 1603 (Museo del Prado)

Pieter Brueghel the Younger, The Road to Calvary, 1603 (Royal Museum of Fine Arts Antwerp)

- Jan Brueghel the Elder, Village with Windmill (1603 or 1605)
- Pieter Brueghel the Younger, The Road to Calvary
- Peter Paul Rubens, Equestrian Portrait of the Duke of Lerma
- Peter Paul Rubens, Portrait of a Young Woman (c. 1603)

== Publications ==
- (anonymous), Litaniae et preces recitandae pro fide catholica romana in regnis Angliae & Scotiae restituenda & propaganda (Douai, Laurence Kellam)
- William Allen, Opus aureum. De Sacramentis in genere, De Eucharistiae sacramento, De Sacrificio Eucharistiae. Tribus libris distinctum (Douai, Balthazar Bellerus)
- Jean d'Assignies, Les vies et faits remarquables de plusieurs Saints et vertueux Moines, Moniales, & Freres Convers du sacré Ordre de Cysteau (Mons, Charles Martin)
- Adrianus Barlandus, Chroniques des ducs de Brabant (Antwerp, Joannes Baptista Vrient)
- Mathias de la Bruyère, Le rosaire de la tres-heureuse vierge Marie (Brussels, Rutger Velpius)
- George Buchanan, Paraphrasis psalmorum Davidis poetica (Douai, Jean Bogard)
- William Colson, Livre, ou instruction de l'art de l'arithmetique es nombres entiers selon les cinq especes, auec une table y ioinct l'art ou l'ordre militaire, qui est la maniere de composer promptement les bataillons quarrés (Liège, Léonard Streel)
- Franciscus Costerus, Petit traite des indulgences contenant plusieurs pointz notables, touchant cette matiere (Brussels, Jan Mommaert)
- Joannes David, Christelijcken waerseggher, de principale stucken van t'christen geloof en leven (Antwerp, Jan Moretus)
- Guilielmus Estius, Historiae martyrium Gorcomiensium, maiori numero fratrum minorum (Douai, Balthazar Bellerus)
- James I of England, Edict du Roy d'Angleterre, Ecosse et Irlande, &c. Par lequel sa Majesté deffend de faire la guerre aux subiets du Roy d'Espagne (Arras, Guillaume de la Rivière)
- James I of England, Proclamatie ofte ordonantie van de Coninlijcke Majesteyt van Engelant, waer in verclaert wert dat de Goederen die genomen zijn vande Ondersaten des Conincx van Spaengien sedert den 24 Aprilis lestleden sullen werden gerestitueert aende eygenaers (Antwerp, Gheleyn Janssens)
- James I of England, Publicatie ende verbodt ghedaen by Jacobus den sesten coninck van Schotlant, teghenwoordich coninck van Ingelant doort welck alle Inghelschen ende Yrlandoisen zijn wederom innegheroepen, met verbot van eenighe oorloghe (Brussels, Rutger Velpius)
- Matthew Kellison, A survey of the new religion, detecting manie grosse absurdities which it implieth (Douai, Laurence Kellam)
- Ferry de Locre, Marie Auguste ou bien Discours des louanges, tiltres et grandeurs; des Royaumes, Isles, Villes, Ordres, Monasteres, Temples, Images, Reliques, Festes, Confreries, Indulgences et Offices de la Mere de Dieu (Arras, Guillaume de la Rivière)
- Pietro da Lucca, A dialogue of dying wel, translated by Richard Verstegan (Antwerp, Arnout Conincx)
- Michael Ophovius, D. Catharinae Senensis [...] vita ac miracula selectiora (Antwerp, Philip Galle)
- Robert Persons, A treatise of three conversions of England from paganisme to Christian religion ([Saint-Omer, François Bellet])
- Lucas Pinelli, Le Gerson de la perfection religieuse et de l’obligation que chaque religieux a de l’acquérir (Liège, Léonard Streel)
- Willem Spoelberch, Corte verclaringe vande principaelste mysterien ende ceremonien die ghebruyckt worden in het alderheylichste sacrificie der missen (Antwerp, Gheleyn Janssens)
- Willem Spoelberch, Nieuwe gheestelijcke refereynen ende liedekens. Ghedicht ende int licht ghebrocht ter eeren Godts ende tot vermakinghe van deuchdelijcke persoonen (Antwerp, Gheleyn Janssens)
- Thomas Stapleton, Orationes theologicae celebriores, in funere diversorum praesulum, et aliae miscellaneae, his temporibus utiles & necessariae (Douai, Balthazar Bellerus)
- Alessandro Valignano, Litterae R. P. Alexandri Valignano, Visitatoris Societatis Jesu in Japponia & China, scriptae 10. octobris 1599 (Antwerp, Joachim Trognaesius)
- Cornelius Columbanus Vrancx, Claer bewijs om Godt altijt ende over al te dienen (Antwerp, Gheleyn Janssens)
- Maximus Aemylianus Vrientius, Epigrammatum libri IX (Antwerp, Joachim Trognaesius)

News pamphlets

- Cort en warachtich verhael van twee schoone victorien, gheschiet in Hungheryen teghen den grooten Turck. Waerof d'eerste gheschiet is den 29. Hoymaent. En d'andere den 3 Oougst laetsleden (Bruges, Pieter Soetart)
- Nae den politiken almanack elck hem reguleert. Opden meridiaen van Brussel gecalculeert (Brussels, Jan Mommaert)

== Births ==
- 27 May – Paulus Pontius, engraver (died 1658)
- 20 October – Simon de Vos, painter (died 1676)

== Deaths ==
- 26 May – Federico Spinola (born 1571), naval commander
- 4 July – Philippe de Monte (born 1521), composer
- 4 December – Maerten de Vos (born 1532), painter

Date uncertain

- Joos van Winghe (born 1544), painter
