= 1597 in Belgium =

- Decades
- See also: Other events of 1597; List of years in Belgium

Events of 1597 in the Spanish Netherlands and Prince-Bishopric of Liège, predecessor states of modern Belgium.

== Incumbents ==
=== Habsburg Netherlands ===
Monarch

- Philip II, King of Spain and Duke of Brabant, of Luxembourg, etc.

Governor General

- Archduke Albert of Austria

=== Prince-Bishopric of Liège ===
Prince-Bishop

- Ernest of Bavaria

== Events ==
- 24 January – Battle of Turnhout
- 4 March – Royal proclamation on the billeting of members of the court in Brussels.
- 8 March – City of Antwerp prohibits dancing lessons during Lent.
- 11 March – Spaniards capture Amiens
- 18 March – Archduke Albert prohibits unlicensed travel to Lapland
- 2 April – Condemnation of Jean Delvaux for witchcraft.
- 14 April – City of Brussels restricts night-time access to streets with brothels.
- 30 April – Prohibition against keeping pigeons, rabbits or pigs at properties lacking gardens within the city of Liège and its suburbs.
- 24 May – After fatal injuries to citizens, the city of Antwerp prohibits games of pall-mall on the city's bulwarks.
- 28 May – City of Antwerp tightens the regulations for commissioners of the city gates.
- 29 May – Gregorius Del Plano granted permission to build new dykes on the Clingepolder, inundated by Dutch forces during the Siege of Hulst the previous year. Work abandoned after eight days due to adverse circumstances.
- 1 July – Proclamation regulating the residency of English and French in the Habsburg Netherlands.
- 17 July – Anna Utenhoven buried alive as an unrepentant Anabaptist in the last execution for heresy in the Low Countries
- 19 July – Proclamation in Liège that those recruited to imperial service in the Long Turkish War should depart from the territory without delay.
- 3 August – Proclamation in Liège that keepers of inns and hostelries in the city and its suburbs should transmit a register of guests to the city government each evening.
- 5 August – City of Antwerp prohibits the renting of housing to non-residents of the city, to reduce the spread of plague
- 9 to 19 August – Siege of Rheinberg
- August – New regulations for the licensing of trade with enemy-held territory.
- 29 August to 3 September – Siege of Meurs
- 5 September – City of Ghent decrees additional regulations for the city watch.
- 10 September – Royal proclamation against the forestalling or hoarding of grain.
- 11 to 28 September – Siege of Groenlo
- 25 September – French take Amiens
- 1 to 9 October – Siege of Bredevoort
- 19 October – Dutch Capture of Enschede
- 19 to 21 October – Dutch Capture of Ootmarsum
- 20 to 23 October – Siege of Oldenzaal
- 24 October – Prince-Bishopric of Liège prohibits the circulation of counterfeit copper coins.
- 25 October to 12 November – Siege of Lingen
- 7 November – Liège extends the 1596 prohibition on exporting sulfur, alum or copperas.

== Art and architecture ==
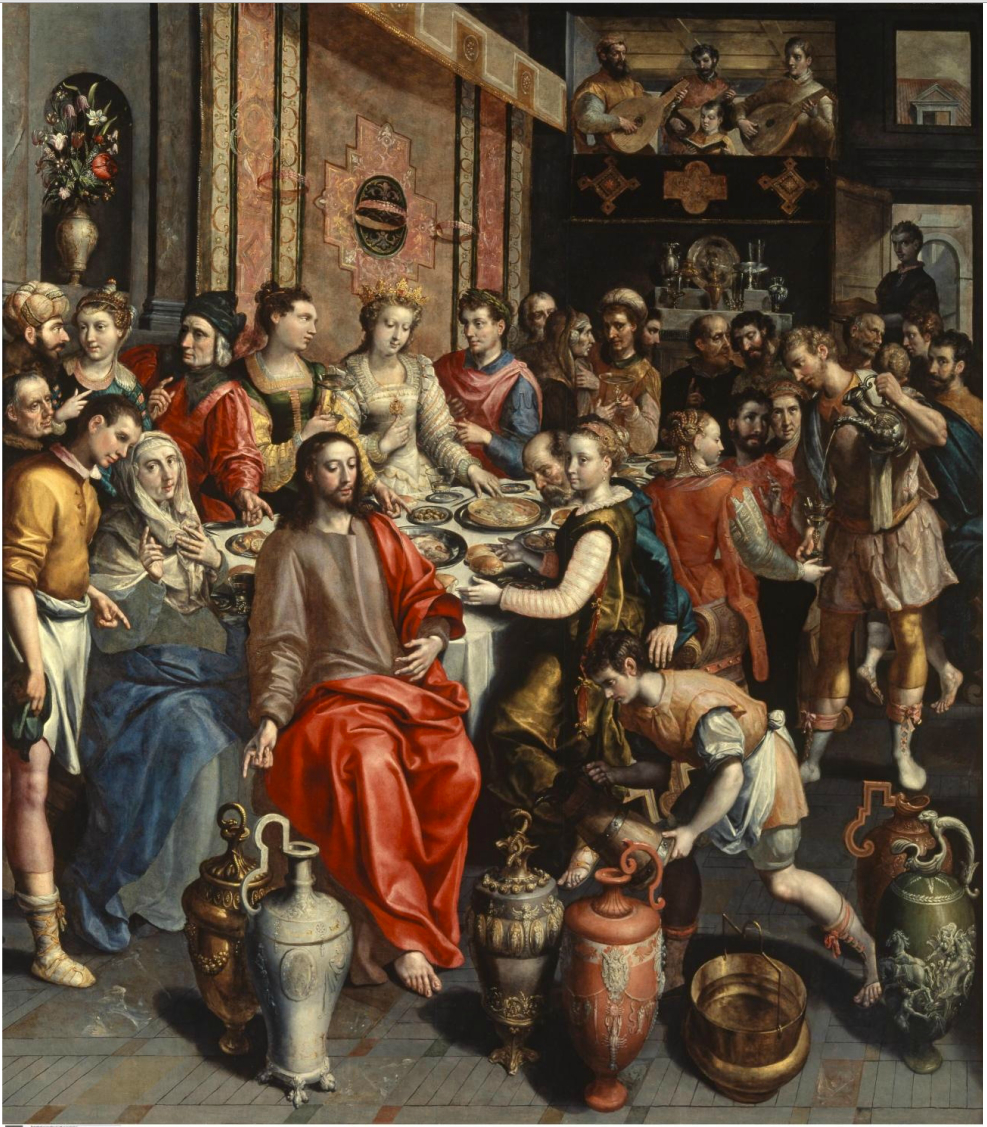
Maerten de Vos, Marriage at Cana (1596 or 1597)

- Maerten de Vos, Marriage at Cana (1596 or 1597)

== Publications ==
- [anonymous], Een nieu clucht boecxken, inhoudende vele schoone vragen ende antwoorden in maniere van geraetsels (Antwerp, Pauwel Stroobant) – a jestbook with riddles
- [anonymous], Bastiment de receptes (Liège, Gérard Rieu) – a book of medicinal recipes
- Francisco Antonio, Avisos para soldados y gente de guerra (Brussels, Rutger Velpius)
- Balthazar Ayala, De jure & officiis bellicis, & disciplina militari (Antwerp, Martinus Nutius)
- Martin Back, Den schadt der catholicker sermoonen: waer inne vertoont worden de verholentheden des Christen gheloofs (Antwerp, Hieronymus Verdussen)
- William Barclay, Ad Melchiorem Moretum carmen (Leuven, Joannes Masius)
- [bible], Le nouveau testament de Jesus Christ, translated by theologians of Leuven (Liège, Henricus Hovius)
- Peter Canisius, Handt-boeck der Catholijcken om godtvruchtelijck te bidden (Antwerp, Plantin Press)
- Peter Canisius, Le manuel des catholiques contenant la vraye maniere de prier Dieu, translated by Gabriel Chappuys (Antwerp, Plantin Press)
- Franciscus Costerus, Vyftich meditatien van de gantsche historie der passie ende des lijdens ons heeren Jesu Christi (Antwerp, Plantin Press)
- Franciscus Costerus, Catholijcke sermoonen op de evangelien van de sondaghen naer Sinxen tot den Advent (Antwerp, Joachim Trognaesius)
- Jacobus Gherinus, Excellent tractaet om te verhueden, preserveren, cureren ende (met Godts hulpe) te genesen de haestighe sieckte oft peste (Antwerp, Peter van Tongheren) – a plague treatise
- Jean-Baptiste de Glen, Les singuliers et nouveau pourtraits pour toutes sortes de lingerie (Liège, Jean de Glen)
- Jean-Baptiste de Glen, Du debvoir des filles. Traicté brief divise en deux parties: la premiere est, de la dignité de la femme. L'autre traicte de la virginité (Liège, Jean de Glen)
- Leuven University, Privilegia academiae Lovaniensi, ab apostolica sede, imperatoribus, regibus, aliisque principibus, concessa (Leuven, Joannes Masius)
- Justus Lipsius, De cruce libri tres ad sacram profanamque historiam utiles (Antwerp, Plantin Press)
- Bernardino de Mendoza, Theorique et praticque de guerre, translated by Edoard de Rynsant (Brussels, Rutger Velpius)
- William Reynolds, Calvino-Turcismus id est, Calvinisticae perfidiae cum Mahumetana collatio, et dilucida utriusque sectae confusio (Antwerp, Pierre Bellère)
- Rudolf II, Translaet vande ordinatie ende mandaet tegens de Ingelsche monopoliers ghenoempt marcantz avanturiers, residerende te Staden (Brussels, Rutger Velpius)
- Jean Scohier, L'estat et comportement des armes (Brussels, Jan Mommaert)
- Robert Turner, Orationes XIV. Accessit oratio funebris in exequiis illustrissimi principis Eystensis, & epistola ad Alanum cardinalem (Antwerp, Andreas Bax for Gommarus Sulsenius)
- Orazio Torsellino, De vita Francisci Xaverii qui primus e Societate Jesu in Indiam & Japoniam evangelium invexit (Liège, Henricus Hovius)
- Cornelius Wytfliet, Descriptionis Ptolemaicae augmentum, sive occidentis notitia brevi commentario illustrata studio et opera (Leuven, Jean Bogard)

News pamphlets

- Cort verhael van t'loos innemen van Amiens in Vrancrijc door een Spaensche capiteyn ende overste genaemt Hernentello (Antwerp, Anthonis de Ballo)
- Discours touchant la prise admirable de la grande et puissante ville d'Amiens, saisi par les Espagnolz, le XI jour de mars, l'an 1597 (Antwerp, Paul Stroobant)
- Vray discours et relation de la subtile entreprinse de Biarnois sur la ville d'Arras le 27 de mars (Brussels, Rutger Velpius)
- Waerachtic verhael, ende geschiedenisse vanden loosen aenslach, den welcken den Byarnois aengerecht heeft op de stadt van Atrecht, den 27 Meert 1597, ende hoe hy met schanden heeft moeten vertrecken (Antwerp, Anthonis de Ballo)

== Births ==
- 12 January – François Duquesnoy, sculptor (died 1643)
- 1 March – Jean-Charles della Faille, Jesuit mathematician (died 1652)
- 6 March – Jan Gaspar Dooms, printmaker (died 1675)
- 8 March – Philippus Nutius, Jesuit (died 1661)
- 22 April – Gilles De Haes, soldier (died 1657)
- 13 May – Cornelis Schut, artist (died 1655)
- 22 May (baptised) – Carolus van den Bosch, bishop of Bruges and of Ghent (died 1665)
- 22 June – Ambrosius Capello, bishop of Antwerp (died 1676)
- 2 July - Theodoor Rombouts, painter (died 1637)
- 28 September - Justus Sustermans, painter (died 1681)

Date uncertain

- Francisco de Melo, aristocrat (died 1651)

== Deaths ==
- 2 February - Lucas van Valckenborch (born c. 1535), painter
- 9 May – Thomas Hyde (born 1524), clergyman
- 17 July – Anna Utenhoven (born 1552), maidservant
- 28 September - Hendrick van den Broeck (born 1519), painter
- 17 October – Michael ab Isselt (born 1530/40), journalist
- 21 December – Peter Canisius (born 1521), Jesuit
