= 1602 in Belgium =

- Decades
- See also: Other events of 1602; List of years in Belgium

Assault on Ostend, 7 January 1602

Events in the year 1602 in the Spanish Netherlands and Prince-bishopric of Liège (predecessor states of modern Belgium).

== Incumbents ==
=== Habsburg Netherlands ===
Sovereigns – Archdukes Albert and Isabella

=== Prince-Bishopric of Liège ===
Prince-Bishop – Ernest of Bavaria

== Events ==
- 7 January – Major assault in the ongoing Siege of Ostend
- 12 June – City of Antwerp prohibits nude bathing in public
- 18 July to 20 September – Siege of Grave
- 1 September – Mutiny of Hoogstraten
- 2 September – City of Antwerp places restrictions on travellers due to outbreak of pestilence at Amsterdam
- 11 September – Wool staple at Bruges confirmed and continued.
- 15 September – Government decree against Hoogstraten mutineers

== Art and architecture ==
Pieter Brueghel the Younger, The Procession to Calvary, 1602

Jan Brueghel the Elder, The Battle of Issus, 1602

Paintings

- Jan Brueghel the Elder, The Battle of Issus
- Pieter Brueghel the Younger, The Procession to Calvary

== Publications ==
- Albertus Magnus, Paradisus animae, sive: De virtutibus libellus, edited by Henricus Sommalius (Antwerp, Plantin Press)
- Johannes Bochius, Historica narratio profectionis et inaugurationis serenissimorum Belgii principum Alberti et Isabellae, Austriae archiducum (Antwerp, Plantin Press)
- Franciscus Costerus, Le livre de la Compagnie, C'est à dire, les cincq livres des institutions chrestiennes et catholiques (Douai, Balthazar Bellerus)
- Joseph Cresswell, La Vie et mort du pere Henry Valpolo anglois p. de la Compagnie de Jesus martirizé en la ville d’Iork au Royaume d’Angleterre (Arras, Robert Maudhuy)
- Joannes David, Corne-fumee du falot hollandois, seruant d'emouchette au lumignon de la lettre branscatoire queres ya (en plaine lune) arcbalestée de la Haye en Hollande (Forchamp, Colophon de Bacharach [false address])
- Joannes David, Domp-hooren der Hollanscher fackel, tot blusschinghe des brandt-briefs ende missive die onlancks met de volle mane uut s'Gravenhaghe gheschoten wierden (printed anonymously)
- Joannes David, Schild-wacht tot seker waerschowvinghe teghen de valsche waersegghers, tooueraers, en̄ derghelijcke ongoddelijckheydt (Antwerp, Jan Moretus)
- Thomas Fitzherbert, A defence of the Catholyke cause ([Antwerp, Arnout Conincx])
- Guillaume Gazet, La Cabinet des dames; contenant l’ornement spirituel de la femme, fille, & vefue chrestienne (Arras, Guillaume de la Rivière)
- Guillaume Gazet, Thesaurus precum et litaniarum ex scripturae sacrae, sanctorumque Patrum gazophilacio depromptus (Arras, Robert Maudhuy)
- Gilles Guillon, Institution de l’arithmétique avec les gettons et la croye très utile et profitable à tous marchans receveurs compteurs de fosses et autres qui détestans les comptes vicieux (Liège, Léonard Streel)
- Justus Lipsius, De bibliothecis syntagma (Antwerp, Plantin Press)
- Justus Lipsius, Epistolarum selectarum centuria secunda ad Belgas (Antwerp, Plantin Press)
- Justus Lipsius, Epistolarum selectarum centuria singularis ad Germanos & Gallos (Antwerp, Plantin Press)
- Ferry de Locre, La Prelature des vierges sacrees (Arras, Guillaume de la Rivière)
- Severin Lubomilius, Histoire de la vie, miracles et canonization de S. Hyacinthe, Polonois, Confesseur de l’Ordre des Freres Prescheurs (Arras, Gilles Bauduin)
- Georges Maigret, Noviciat, ou compas journalier de la vie monastique, comprenant brefvement en forme de dialogues, ce à quoy toutes personnes Religieuses tant hommes que femmes se doibvent occuper tout le long de la journee (Douai, Jean Bogard)
- Lodewijk Makeblijde, Cort begrijp van acht oeffeninghen, alle Christen menschen seer dienende om wel te leven, ende deuchdelijck in Godts teghenwoordicheyt te verkeeren (Leuven, Joannes Masius)
- Abraham Ortelius, Theatro d'el orbe de la tierra el qual antes el estremo dia de su vida por la postrera vez ha emendado, y con nueuas tablas y commentarios augmentado y esclarescido (Antwerp, Plantin Press)
- Juan Vicente Peliger, Formulario y estilo curioso de escrivir cartas missivas (Brussels, Rutger Velpius)
- Robert Persons, An appendix to the apologie, lately set forth, for defence of the hierarchie, and subordination of the English Catholike Church, impugned by certaine discontented priestes ([Antwerp, Arnout Conincx])
- Robert Persons, A manifestation of the great folly and bad spirit of certayne in England calling themselues secular priestes ([Antwerp, Arnout Conincx]), 1602
- Robert Persons, The warn-word to Sir Francis Hastinges wast-word ([Antwerp, Arnout Conincx])
- Petrus van Vladeracken, Diarium, sive Brevis quaedam rerum per singulos dies in obsidione Silvi-Ducensi gestarum descriptio (Leuven, Joannes Masius)
- Cornelius Columbanus Vrancx, De wercken, de mirakelen, het heyligh leven, de ghebeden en lofzanghen van d'hooghweerdighe maghet en moeder Gods Maria (Ghent, Gauthier Manilius)
- Richard White of Basingstoke, Historiarum Britanniae liber nonus, Quo fundamenta Regni, & Ecclesiae Anglorum in Insula exponuntur (Douai, Charles Boscard)

News pamphlets

- Een seer vremde, miraculeuse, vreeselijcke ende waerachtighe historie geschiedt binnen de stadt van Edam (Antwerp, Hieronymus Verdussen)

== Births ==
- 18 February (baptism) – Pieter Meulener, painter (died 1654)
- 26 May – Philippe de Champaigne, painter (died 1674)
- 4 June – Gertruida van Veen, painter (died 1643)

date uncertain

- Hendrick de Somer, painter (died c. 1655)
- Jan Raes II, tapestry weaver (died 1639)

== Deaths ==
- 1 June – Mathias Lambrecht (born 1539), bishop of Bruges
- 4 September (burial) – Gillis van den Vliete (born c. 1535), sculptor
