= 1596 in Belgium =

- Decades
- See also: Other events of 1596; List of years in Belgium

Events of 1596 in the Spanish Netherlands and Prince-Bishopric of Liège, predecessor states of modern Belgium.

Entrance of the Cardinal-Archduke Albert into Brussels in 1596

== Incumbents ==
=== Habsburg Netherlands ===
Monarch

- Philip II, King of Spain and Duke of Brabant, of Luxembourg, etc.

Governor General

- Pedro Henriquez de Acevedo, Count of Fuentes (acting); Archduke Albert of Austria (from 11 February)

=== Prince-Bishopric of Liège ===
Prince-Bishop

- Ernest of Bavaria

== Events ==
Workshop of Frans Hogenberg, Taking of Ardres

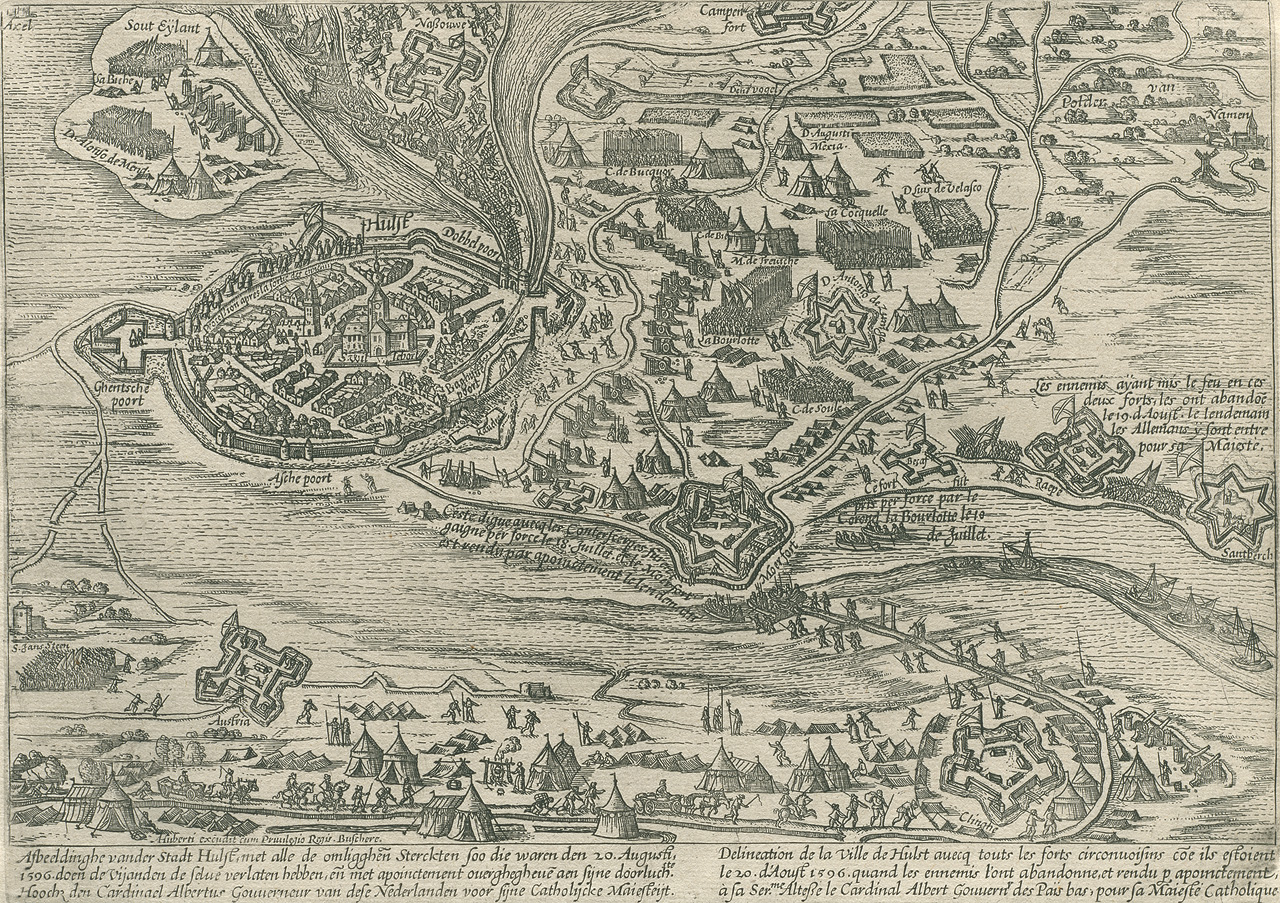
Siege of Hulst

- 20 January – Council of Flanders registers royal decree prohibiting the exportation of beer or other drinks produced from grain.
- 4 February – Decree regulating the brewers' trade in Huy.
- 11 February – Archduke Albert makes his formal entry into Brussels; Ottavio Mirto Frangipani arrives with him as papal nuncio.
- 8 to 24 April – Army of Flanders successfully besieges Calais
- 26 May – Army of Flanders occupies Ardres
- 22 May – City of Antwerp issues instructions for the watch.
- 27 May – New disciplinary regulations for the Army of Flanders issued.
- 19 June – Royal decree on the channel and clearance of the River Zenne in Brussels and Vilvoorde.
- July – Mutiny at Zichem ends after two years.
- 20 August – Army of Flanders retakes Hulst
- 26 October – City of Ghent issues instructions for the city watch and the pursuit of rural freebooters
- 16 November – Decree prohibiting fraud, favouritism and corruption in the election of city commissioners in Liège.
- 20 November – Philip II of Spain suspends interest payments on crown debt.
- 9 December – Regulations for the civic militia issued in Liège.
- 15 December – Jean Sarazin consecrated archbishop of Cambrai
- 24 December – Order temporarily suspending all trade or exchange of alum, sulfur or copperas in Liège.

== Art and architecture ==
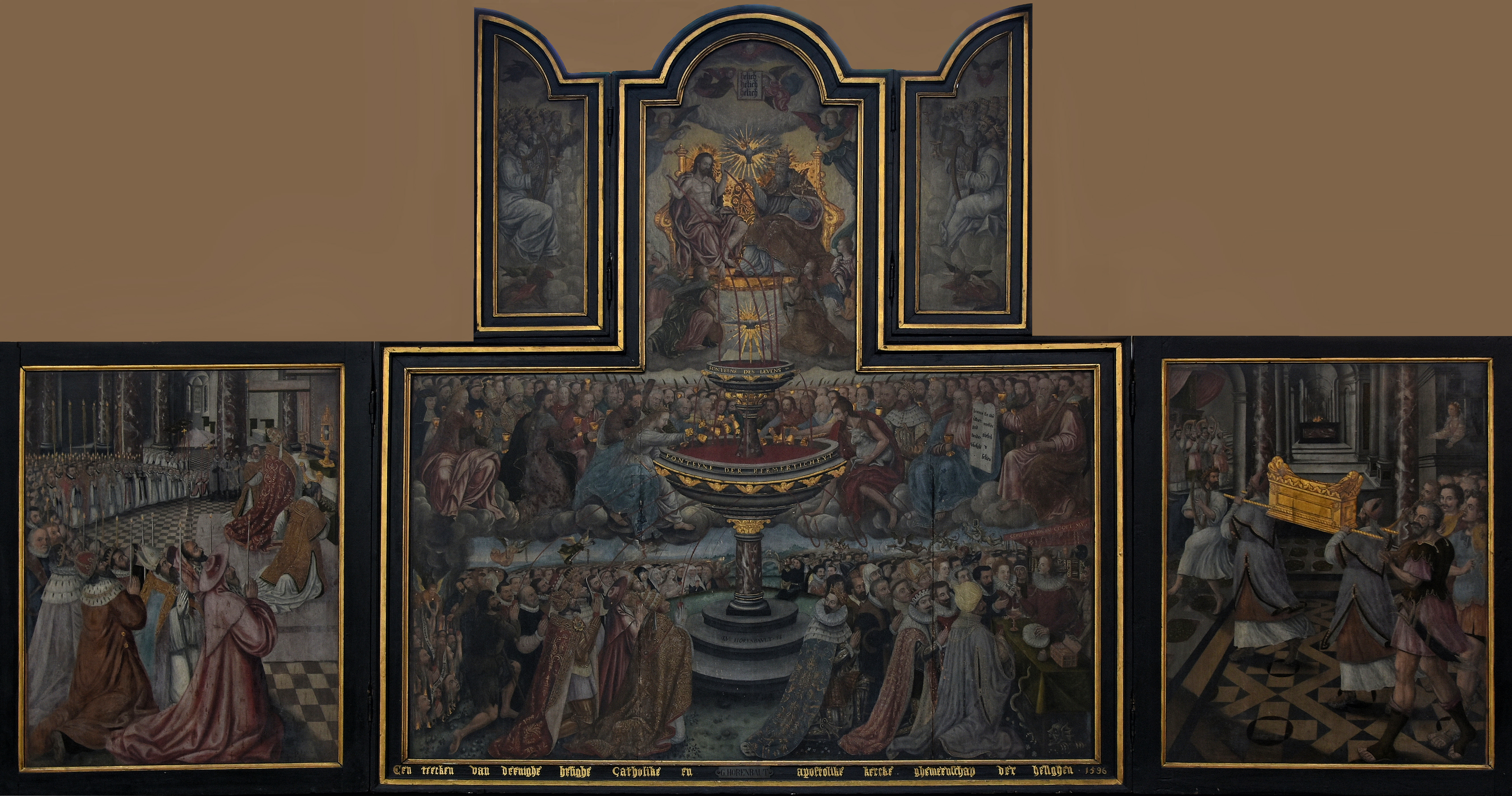
Lucas Horenbout, The Fountain of Life (1596)

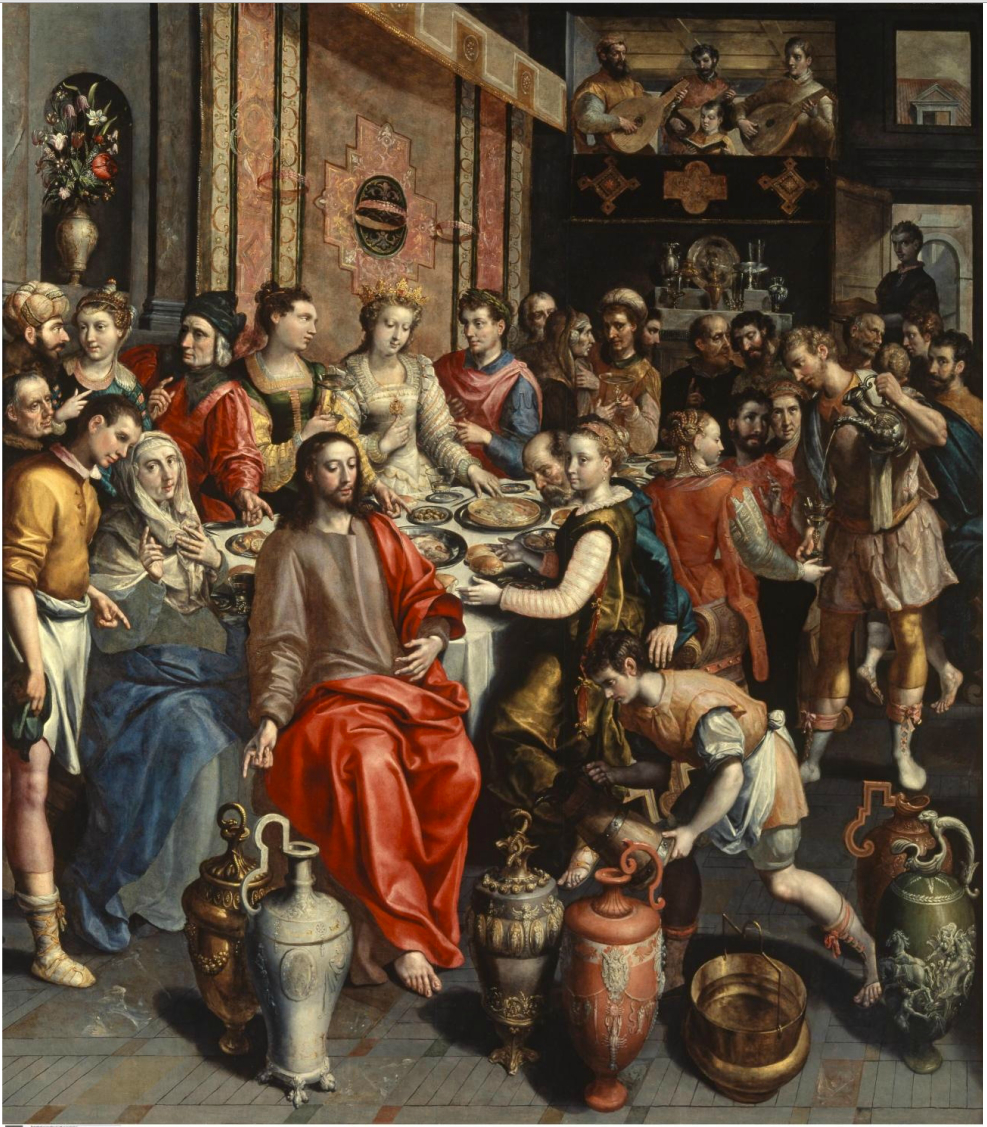
Maerten de Vos, Wedding at Cana (1596 or 1597)

Paintings

- Lucas Horenbout, The Fountain of Life
- Maerten de Vos, Wedding at Cana

== Publications ==
- [anonymous], Beclach van een treffelycke persoone, beminder vande welvaert ende ruste des gemeenen vaderlants, over die tyrannie ende gewelt der generale Staten vande vereenichde Nederlanden, claerlyck blyckende by hunne placcaeten ende namentlyck by d'leste vanden iiij. aprilis M.D.XCVI (published anonymously)
- Jan Bernaerts, De Lirani oppidi ab Hollandis occupati, per Mechlinianos et Antverpianos admiribili liberatione commentariolvs. Vna cum breui narratione de origine & pregressu calamitatum Belgij (Leuven, Joannes Masius)
- Jean Boucher, Oraison funebre sur le tres-pas de feu tres-noble et tres-valeureux, messire Chrestien de Savigny, seigneur de Rone, mareschal de France, et faisant la charge de mareschal de camp general en l'armée de sa majesté catholique (Brussels, Jan Mommaert)
- Jean Chapeauville, De casibus reservatis tractatus in duas partes distinctus. Accessit tractatus brevis de casibus reservatis regularium praelatis (Liège, Jacques Gregoire)
- Franciscus Costerus, Het boecxken der broederschap, dat is: vijf boecken der christelijcker leeringhen, voor de broederschap der H. Maghet Maria (Antwerp, Plantin Press)
- Joannes David, Kettersche spinnecoppe, waer in bewesen wort, hoe deghelijck een saecke dat een ketter is (Brussels, Rutger Velpius)
- Guillaume Desquenes, La vie de madame sainte Renelle vierge et martyre (Leuven, Jean Bogard)
- Juan de Flores, Historia de Aurelio y Isabela. L'histoire d'Aurelio et Isabelle, parallel text translation by Gilles Corrozet (Brussels, Rutger Velpius)
- Jan Franco, Almanach, oft journael voor t'schrickeljaer M.D.XCVI (Antwerp, Arnout Coninx)
- Jan Franco, Prognosticatie ende schoone beschrijvinghe vanden Turckschen val, met hen hereticsche adherenten ende uutlantsche provincien: ende der goede pauselijcke revolutien onser Duytscher Neder-landen, van dit schrickeljaer 1596 (Antwerp, Arnout Coninx)
- Juan González de Mendoza, Historia de las cosas mas notables, rites y costumbres, del gran reyno de la China (Antwerp, Petrus Bellerus)
- Hendrik Herp, Le guidon des spirituelz et contemplatifz contenant douze mortifications (Arras, Guillaume de la Rivière)
- Jacobus Jansenius, In canticum canticorum Salomonis commentarius (Leuven, Joannes Masius & Philippus Zangrius)
- Mathieu Lambert, Discours du danger et peril qu'il y a de converser et hanter trop familiairement avec femmes, tant seculieres que religieuses (Liège, Henricus Hovius)
- Mathieu Lambert, La reigle de Saint Benoist (Liège, Henricus Hovius)
- Orlando Lassus, La fleur des chansons a quatre, cinq, six et huit parties (Antwerp, Petrus Phalesius the Younger)
- John Lesley, Congratulatio principi Alberto archiduci Austriae de fausto ad regimen provinciarum inferioris Germaniae (Brussels, Rutger Velpius)
- Justus Lipsius, Ad libros politicorum notae et de una religione liber (Antwerp, Plantin Press)
- Justus Lipsius, De militia Romana libri quinque: commentarius ad Polybium (Antwerp, Plantin Press)
- Justus Lipsius, Poliorceticoon, sive, de machinis, tormentis, telis libri quinque (Antwerp, Plantin Press)
- Sancho de Londoño, El discurso sobre la forma de reduzir la disciplina militar, a meior y antiguo estado (Brussels, Rutger Velpius)
- Jacques Marchant, Flandria commentariorum libri IIII descripta: in quibus de Flandriae origine, commoditatibus, oppidis, castellaniis, ordinibus, magistratibus, indigenisque aliisque memoralibilius breviter dilucideque tractatur (Antwerp, Plantin Press)
- Bernardino de Mendoza, Theorica y practica de guerra (Antwerp, Plantin Press)
- Abraham Ortelius, Aurei saeculi imago, sive Germanorum veterum vita, mores, ritus & religio: iconibus delineata, et commentariis ex utriusque lingua auctoribus descripta (Antwerp, Plantin Press for Philip Galle)
- Petrus Phalesius the Younger, Paradiso musicale di madrigali et canzoni a cinque voci (Antwerp, Petrus Phalesius the Younger)
- Peter Philips, Il primo libro de madrigali a sei voci (Antwerp, Petrus Phalesius the Younger)
- Baldassare Pisanelli, Traicté de la nature des viandes et du boire (1596)
- Claude Prieur, Dialogue de la lycanthropie ou transformation d'hommes en loups (Leuven, Joannes Maes and Philippe Zangre)
- Zacharius Rotz, Historie van het leven der heyliger Maechden Harlindis ende Relindis, uut de legende int cortste ende ghetrouwelijckste overgestelt (Liège, Christian Ouwerx)
- Thomas Stapleton, Principiorum fidei doctrinalium relectio scholastica & compendiaria. Per controversias, quaestiones et articulos tradita. Accessit per modum appendicis triplicatio inchoata adversus Gulielmum Whitakerum Anglo-Calvinistam pro authoritate ecclesiae (Antwerp, Jan van Keerberghen)
- Antoine Tiron, Recueil de plusieurs plaisantes nouvelles, apophtegmes et recreations diverses (Antwerp, Martin Huyssens)
- Orazio Torsellini, De vita Francisci Xaverii (Antwerp, Joachim Trognaesius)
- Frans Vervoort, Mandelet de l'espoux, de l'imitation interieure de la vie et croix de nostre seigneur Jesus Christ (Arras, Guillaume de la Rivière)
- Henri de Vicq, De sanctorum communione (Antwerp, Jan van Keerbergen)
- Cornelius Columbanus Vrancx, Den spieghel oft practijcke van het kersten gheloove (Ghent, Gauthier Manilius)
- Henri de Wachtendonck, La bellone Belgique contenante la prinse des villes Calais, Ardres et Hulst (Antwerp, H. Swingenius and Anthony Tielmans)
- Richard White of Basingstoke, Ad leges decem-virorum in duodecim tabulis; institutiones juris civilis in quatuor libris; primam partem digestorum in quatuor libris; notae juris interpretati (Arras, Guillaume de la Rivière)
- Richard White, Orationes: 1. de circulo artium et philosophiae, 2. de eloquentia et Cicerone, 3. pro divitiis regum, 4. pro doctoratu, 5 de studiorum finibus: cum notis rerum variarum et antiquitatis (Arras, Guillaume de la Rivière)

News pamphlets

- Brevis enarratio eorum quae Bruxellae in adventu Alberti archiducis Austriae edita fuere, tertia idus februarii anno M.D.XCVI (Brussels, Jan Mommaert)
- Briefve relation de la guerre d'Irlande (Brussels, Rutger Velpius)
- Capitulatie ende articulen van de Stadt van Ardres (after the copy printed in Arras by Jean Bourgeois)
- Copie de diverses lettres envoyees de Prague ... Par lesquelles sont declairees les victoires contre les Turcqs et Tartares (Brussels, Rutger Velpius)
- Discours au particulier de ce qui se passa a l'isle de Hulst la nuictée du jeudy & le vendredy ensuyvant 19. jour de juillet, 1596 (Antwerp, Arnout Coninx)
- Discours touchant la prise admirable de la ville de Calais (Arras, Guillaume de la Rivière)
- Discours veritable de la signalee et miraculeuse prinse de la ville et chasteau de Calais (Brussels, Rutger Velpius)
- Discours veritable des choses advenues au siege de Calais (Mons, Charles Michel)
- Discours veritable des choses advenues au siege de la ville et chasteau de Calais, renduz en l'obeissance de sa majeste catholique, par l'archiduc, cardinal d'Austrice (Antwerp, Plantin Press)
- Een waerachtich nieu liedeken van het overgeven der stadt Hulst in handen van Cardinael Albertus op den 18 Aug. 1596. Op de wijse: den prince van Conde (Antwerp, Anthonis de Ballo)
- Historie ende warachtich verhael van diversche schoone merckelycke victorien die den almogenden Godt ghelieft heeft te verleenen den Roomschen Keyser in Hongueryen (Brussels, Rutger Velpius)
- Waerachtich verhael van t'ghene gheschiet in Calis ende het innemen van het casteel (Antwerp, Gillis Stelsius and Pauwel Stroobant)
- Waerachtich verhael vant overleveren van Hulst aen Albertus van Oostenrijcke (Antwerp, Anthonis de Ballo)
- Warachtich verhael van die miraculeuse ende wonderlycke victorie int inne-nemen van Caleys (Brussels, Rutger Velpius)
- Waerachtich verhael van het innemen van het casteel van Calis, mette declaratie vande doode ende ghevangene, so het selve overghesonden is uut Calis (Antwerp, Anthonis de Ballo)
- Warachtich verhael vant overleveren der stadt van Hulst in Vlaanderen aen Albertus van Oostenrijcke, gouverneur generael vande Nederlanden (Antwerp, Jan III van Ghelen)

== Births ==
- 7 January – Francis Wichmans, abbot of Tongerlo Abbey (died 1661)
- 20 January – Sidronius Hosschius, priest-poet (died 1653)
- 20 April (baptism) – Charles de Hovyne, statesman (died 1671)
- 9 May (baptism) – Abraham van Diepenbeeck, painter (died 1675)
- 13 August
  - Jean Bolland, hagiographer (died 1665)
  - Ferdinand van Spoelberch, knight (died 1675)
- 15 August – Karel de Visch, Cistercian (died 1666)
- 28 September – Olivier de Wree, poet and historian (died 1652)

Date uncertain

- Jacob Foppens van Es, painter (died 1666)

== Deaths ==
- 4 January - Cristóbal de Mondragón (born 1514), general
- 15 February – Louis de Berlaymont (born 1542), archbishop of Cambrai
- 29 February – Philippe Rogier (born c. 1561), composer
- 6 May – Giaches de Wert (born 1535), composer
- 17 October – Anne Percy, Countess of Northumberland (born 1536), in exile

Date uncertain

- Frans Boels (born c. 1555), painter
