= 1598 in Belgium =

- Decades
- See also: Other events of 1598; List of years in Belgium

Map of the Principality of Liège (1598)

Events of 1598 in the Spanish Netherlands and Prince-Bishopric of Liège, predecessor states of modern Belgium.

== Incumbents ==
=== Habsburg Netherlands ===
Monarch

- Philip II, King of Spain and Duke of Brabant, of Luxembourg, etc., to September.
- Isabella Clara Eugenia and Albert VII, Archduke of Austria, as co-sovereigns from September.

Governor General

- Albert VII, Archduke of Austria
- Cardinal-Archduke Andreas of Austria, acting governor general

=== Prince-Bishopric of Liège ===
Prince-Bishop

- Ernest of Bavaria

== Events ==
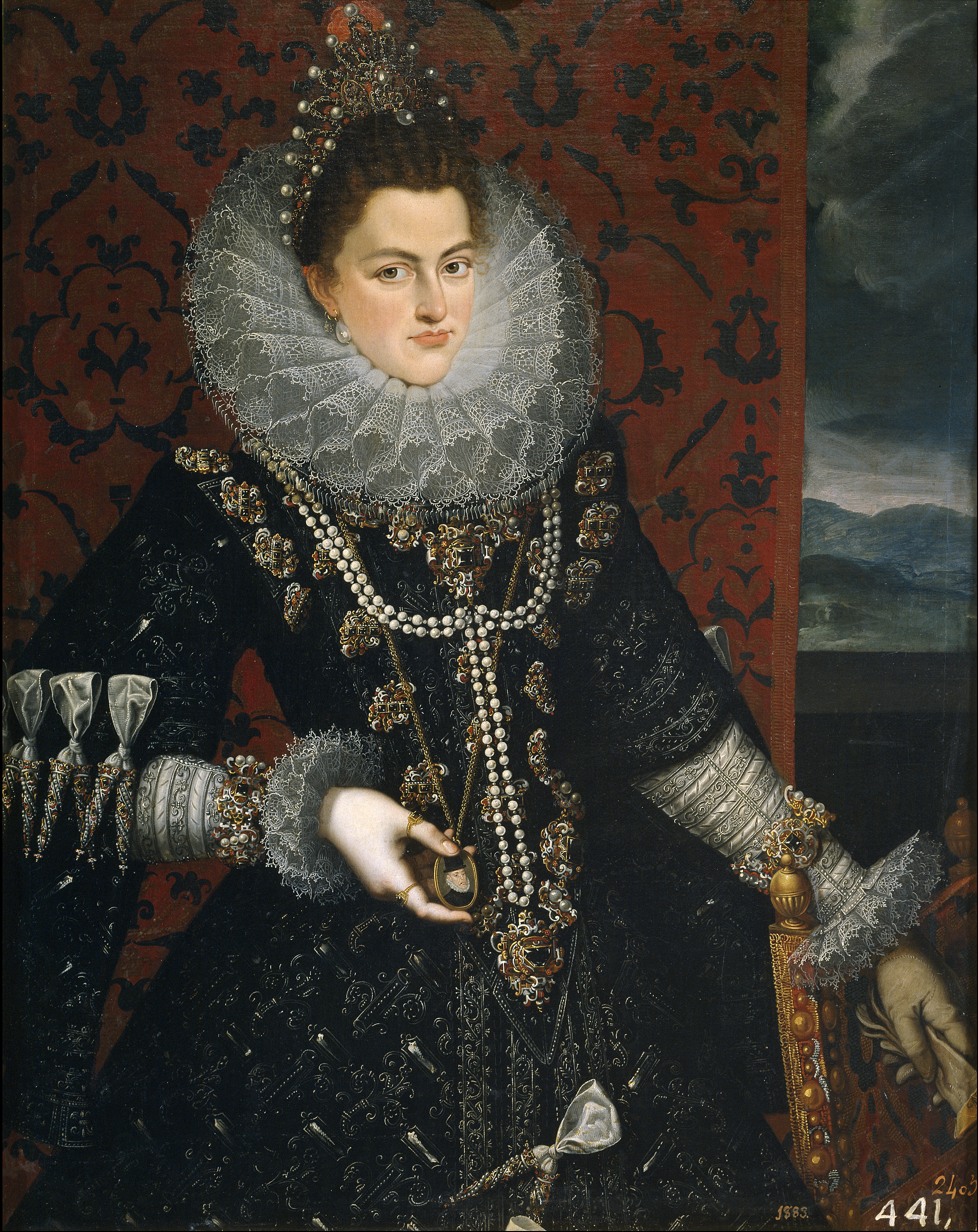
Juan Pantoja de la Cruz, Infanta Isabella Clara Eugenia, 1598 (Museo del Prado)

- 20 April – City of Antwerp prohibits non-residents from renting houses or warehouses, as a precaution against the spread of plague.
- 2 May – Peace of Vervins concluded
- 6 May – Philip II transfers the Low Countries to his daughter, Isabella Clara Eugenia.
- 9 May – City of Antwerp prohibits the gathering of mushrooms or herbs on the city's fortifications.
- 17 June – City of Antwerp issues by-law for the conservation of fish in the River Scheldt.
- 21 to 22 August – Archduke Albert formally takes possession of the Low Countries for the Infanta Isabella.
- 9 September – Mathias Hovius, Archbishop of Mechelen, prohibits servile work on Sundays.
- 14 September – Archduke Albert departs from Brussels to fetch the Infanta Isabella from Spain.
- 9 to 14 October – Francisco de Mendoza successfully besieges Rheinberg.
- 12 October – Cardinal-Archduke Andreas issues proclamation against forestalling and hoarding of foodstuffs.
- 13 October – City of Bruges issues instructions to citizens for emergencies.
- 12 December – Cardinal-Archduke Andreas prohibits the importation of Spanish, French and Rhenish wine.

== Art and architecture ==
Jan Brueghel the Elder, Calvary, 1598 (Alte Pinakothek)

Pieter Claeissens the Younger, Portrait of a Woman, 1598 (Groeningemuseum)

- Jan Brueghel the Elder, Calvary
- Pieter Claeissens the Younger, Portrait of a Woman

== Publications ==
- [anonymous], Histoire plaisante, facetieuse et recreative du Lazare de Tormes, translated by Jean Van der Meeren (Antwerp, Guislain Jansens)
- Guillaume d'Assonleville, Atheomastix sive adversus religionis hostes universos (politicos maxime) dissertatio (Antwerp, Plantin Press)
- Juan de Bonilla, Een cort tractaet: daer inne verclaert wordt hoe nootsaeckelijcken zy de vrede der sielen, ende hoemen dien vercrijghen can (Antwerp, Joannes Moretus)
- Jean Boulaese, Le manuel de l'admirable victoire du corps de Dieu sur l'esprit maling de Beelzebub obtenue à Laon 1566 (Liège, Henricus Hovius) – concerning the exorcism of Nicole Aubrey
- Franciscus Costerus,Antwoorde op de Hollandtsche sententie tegen Peeter Panne (Antwerp, Joachim Trognaesius)
- Franciscus Costerus, Apologia catholica, dat is, catholijcke antwoorde op een kettersch boecxken Gaspari Grevinchovii, Geusch predikant tot Rotterdam (Antwerp, Joachim Trognaesius)
- Franciscus Costerus, Catholijcke sermoonen op de evangelien van de sondaghen naer Sinxen tot den advent (Antwerp, Joachim Trognaesius)
- Franciscus Costerus, Seyndt-Brief aen de edele ende wiise heeren representerende de Staten ende raedt van Hollandt, Zeelandt, &c. met eenen brief aen Gaspar Grevinchoven (Antwerp, Joachim Trognaesius)
- Henricus Cuyckius, Catholische onderrichtinge van het sacrament des Vermsels (Leuven, Joannes Masius)
- Henricus Cuyckius, De concubinariis pastoribus nullius necessitatis praetextu in ministerio tolerandis, ad Georgium Eleutherium paraenetica epistola (Leuven, Joannes Masius)
- Henricus Cuyckius, Edictum de archipresbyterorum et parochorum officiis, & de synodo archipresbyterali pro dioecesi Ruraemundensi (Leuven, Joannes Masius)
- Joannes David, Kettersche spinnecoppe waerin, deur de natuere der spinnecoppe, claerlijck bewesen wort, hoe deghelijck en onboorlijck een saecke dat een ketter is (Brussels, Rutger Velpius)
- Martin Delrio, Florida Mariana, sive de laudibus sacratissimae virginis Deiparae panegyrici XIII (Antwerp, Plantin Press)
- Leon De Meyere, Poeme. Advis pour la paix de la Belgique. A son altesse (Antwerp, Arnout Coninx)
- Thomas Feyens, De cauteriis libri quinque (Leuven, Joannes Baptista Zangrius)
- Jan Franco, Almanach oft journael voor her jaer M.D.XCVIII (Antwerp, Arnout Coninx)
- Theodoor Galle, XII cardinalium pietate, doctrina rebusque gestis maxime illustrium imagines et elogia (Antwerp, Philip Galle)
- Guillaume Gazet, La suite des evesques d'Arras depuis la separation de l'evesché de Cambray (Arras, Gilles Baudouin)
- Pontus Heuterus, Rerum Belgicarum libri quindecim, quibus describuntur pace belloque gesta a principibus Austriacis in Belgio, nempe Maxaemillano I, Philippo I, Carolo V, Philippo II (Antwerp, Martinus Nutius)
- Lambert Le Ruite, Histoire memorable de saincte Juliene vierge, jadis prieure de la maison de Cornillon (Liège, Peter Soetaert)
- Justus Lipsius, Admiranda, sive, de magnitudine Romana libri quattuor (Antwerp, Plantin Press)
- Justus Lipsius, Analecta sive observationes reliquae ad militiam et hosce libros (Antwerp, Plantin Press)
- Justus Lipsius, De militia Romana libri quinque, commentarius ad Polybium. Editio nova (Antwerp, Plantin Press)
- Justus Lipsius, Saturnalium sermonum libri duo, qui de gladiatoribus. Editio ultima et castigatissima (Antwerp, Plantin Press)
- Corneille Martin, Les genealogies et anciennes descentes des forestiers et comtes de Flandre, avec brieves descriptions de leurs vies (Antwerp, Jean Baptiste Vrints)
- Bernardino de Mendoza, Theoricque et practicque de guerre, translated by Edoard de Rynsant (Brussels, Rutger Velpius)
- Mons, Lois, chartes et coustumes du cheflieu de la ville de Mons, et des villes resortissantez (Mons, Charles Michel)
- Abraham Ortelius, Argonautica (Antwerp, Joannes Moretus)
- Abraham Ortelius, Tabula itineraria: ex illustri Peutingerorum bibliotheca quae Augustae Vindelicorum est beneficio Marci Velseri in lucem edita (Antwerp, Joannes Moretus)
- Abraham Ortelius, Theatre de l'univers, contenant les cartes de tout le monde. Avec une brieve declaration d'icelles (Antwerp, Plantin Press)
- Robert Persons, A Christian directorie guiding men to their salvation (Leuven, Laurence Kellam)
- Peter Philips, Madrigali a otto voci (Antwerp, Pierre II Phalèse)
- Jean Polit, Prognosie de l'estat de Liege et response a un escrit seditieux espars par l'Isle de Liege lors de la surprinse du chasteau de Huy (Liège, Christian Ouwerx)
- Nicolas de Rebbe, Oratio panegyrica quarta. De pace seu relatio deliberativa de concordia principum christianorum, tranquillitate ecclesiae Cathae et bello Trucis inferendo (Brussels, Jan Mommaert)
- Zacharius Rotz, Christeliike leeringhe, in vier boecken ghedeylt (Liège, Jean Voes)
- Thomas Sailly, Brevis narratio legationis domini Francisci de Mendoza ad archiduces Matthiam & Maximilianum, necnon ad archiducissam Mariam & Ferdinandum, ac ad serenissimum regem Poloniae (Brussels, Rutger Velpius)
- Thomas Sailly, Thesaurus litaniarum ac orationum sacer: cum adversius sectarios apologiis (Brussels, Rutger Velpius)
- Melchor de Santa Cruz, Floresta española de apogthemas o sentencias sabia y graciosamente dichas, de algunos españoles (Brussels, Rutger Velpius)
- Lorenzo Scupoli, The spiritual conflict (Antwerp, printed anonymously)
- Richard Stanyhurst, Psalmi, litaniae e orationes quae coram augustissima Eucharistia perapposite recitari possunt (Antwerp, Joannes Moretus)
- Thomas Stapleton, Manuale peccatorum, sive de septem capitalibus peccatis orationes catecheticae duodecim (Antwerp, Jan van Keerberghen)
- Thomas Stapleton, Antidota apostolica contra nostri temporis haereses: in posteriorem beati Pauli epistolam ad Corinthios tomi tertii, pars altera (Antwerp, Jan van Keerberghen)
- Martin Van den Dycke, Claer ende cort bewijs om te leeren boeck-houden nae de maniere van Italien (Antwerp, Anthonis de Ballo)
- Cornelis Columbanus Vrancx, Dat levende ende levenmakende hemelsch-broodt, Jesus Christus lichaemelick present in dat hooghweerdigh heyligh sacrament des aultaers (Ghent, Gauthier Manilius)
- Cornelius Columbanus Vrancx, Eenen zeer schoonen gheestelicken mey, die den Heere Jesus is (Ghent, Gauthier Manilius)
- Cornelius Columbanus Vrancx, Het gheestelic Paesch-Lam (Ghent, Gauthier Manilius)
- Cornelius Columbanus Vrancx, Hondert ende vijftich zeer profytighe vraghen en andtwoorden, naer het ghetal van Davids psalmen (Ghent, Gauthier Manilius)
- Maximilien de Wignacourt, In res Belgicas deinosis (Antwerp, Andreas Bax)
- Richard White of Basingstoke, Historiarum Britanniae liber sextus (Arras, Guillaume de la Rivière, and Douai, Charles Boscard)
- Henri Willot, Athenae orthodoxorum sodalitii Franciscani qui, vel selecta eruditione, vel floridiore eloquentia, vel editis scriptis Dei sponsae Romanae operam navarunt (Liège, Arnoult de Coerswarem)
- Cornelius Wytfliet, Descriptionis Ptolomaicae augmentum siue Occidentis notitia brevi commentario illustrata, et hac secunda editione magna sui parte aucta (Leuven, Gerard Rivius)

News pamphlets

- Aen de afghewekene Provincien van Hollant, Zeelant, etc. (Brussels, Rutger Velpius)
- Aen Hollandt "O edel Hollandt hoochmoedich verheven" (Leuven, Joannes Masius)
- Aen Hollant "Vrede soect ende eendrachticheyt" (anonymously printed)
- Beclach, van die van Hollant en Zeelandt (Antwerp, Anthonis de Ballo)
- Brief discours du voyage et entrees faictes par la royne d'Espagne en Italie, avecq les triumphes et pompes exhibees, tant en la ville de Ostia, Ferrare, Mantoue, Cremone, Milan, que es autres Bourgades et Villettes d'Italie (Brussels, Rutger Velpius)
- Les ceremonies observees a la solennisation de la paix (Arras, Claude Bauduin)
- Chanson nouvelle pour rendre action de graces au bon Dieu touchant la paix faicte a Vervin entre les Roys (Arras, Guillaume de La Rivière and Gilles Baudouin)
- Copie de la lettre d'un gentilhomme d'Arthois escrite de Parague (Arras, Guillaume de La Rivière)
- Copie des lettres envoyees de son alteze en Arras pour la publication de la paix le 7 juin 1598 (Arras, Guillaume de La Rivière and Gilles Baudouin)
- Copye van eenen sekeren brief gheschreven uyt Praga. Waer inne verhaelt wort het seer loffelijck ende wonderlijck in-nehmen der stercke stadt Rab (Antwerp, Martin Huyssens)
- Dialogus oft t'samen-sprekinge, tusschen den huysman, ende den crijchsman. Tracterende van desen Nederlantschen peys ([Antwerp], Anthonis de Ballo)
- De gheluckighe incomste des Hooghgheborene Coninghinne van Spaengien, Vrou Margarita van Oostenrijck, in de vermaerde Stadt van Ferrare. Met de Feestelijcke Ceremonien (Brussels)
- Die ghelucksalige intree ende incompste van Margriete van Oostenrijc binnen Ferrare, den xiii. novembris (Antwerp, Anthonis de Ballo)
- Proeuve certaine et veritable demonstration de la faulse confession de Pierre Panne d'Ypre, mise en lumiere par les rebelles de Hollande, contre la Societe de Jesus de Douay (Brussels, Rutger Velpius)
- Waerachtighe beschrijvinge van de groote victorie die Godt almachtich den Christenen verleent heeft teghen onsen erf-vyant den Turckschen keyser (Antwerp, Anthonis de Ballo)
- Waerachtighe beschrijvinge van een kint het welck gheboren is binnen de stadt van Rotterdam in Hollant (Antwerp, Anthonis de Ballo)
- Wonderlycke geschiedenisse, ende grouwelijck verhael, vant' ghene datter ghebeurt is op Goensdach den xv. julij van dit tegenwoordich jaer 1598. inde landen van Poictou, Touraine ende andere omliggende plaetsen door den donder ende vierighe blixemen van den hemel (Antwerp, Anthonis de Ballo)

== Births ==
- 6 January (baptism) – Philips van Mallery, engraver (died after 1634)
- 27 April (baptism) – Michael van Langren, astronomer and cartographer (died 1675)
- 21 October – Jacobus Wemmers, Carmelite (died 1645)

Date uncertain

- Henry Taylor, diplomat (died 1662)

== Deaths ==
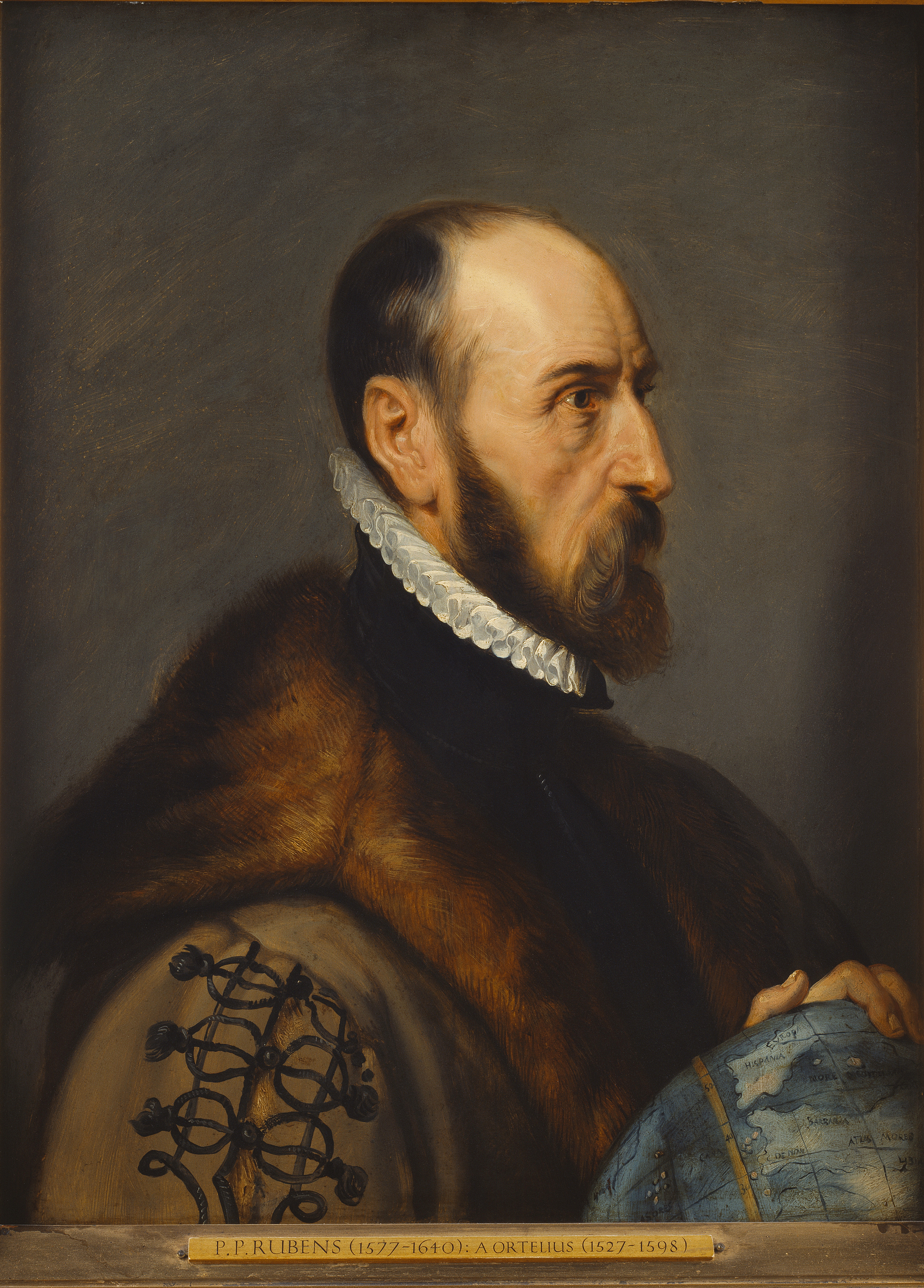
Peter Paul Rubens, Abraham Ortelius (1633)

- 3 March – Jean Sarazin (born 1539), archbishop
- 27 March – Theodor de Bry (born 1527/28), engraver
- 28 June – Abraham Ortelius (born 1527), geographer
- 13 September – Philip II (born 1527), king
- 12 October – Thomas Stapleton (born 1535), theologian
- 10 November – Simon Verepaeus (born 1522), priest and educator
- 15 December – Philips of Marnix, Lord of Saint-Aldegonde (born 1540), nobleman
- 28 December – Gillis Mostaert (born 1528), painter
