= 1595 in Belgium =

- Decades
- See also: Other events of 1595; List of years in Belgium

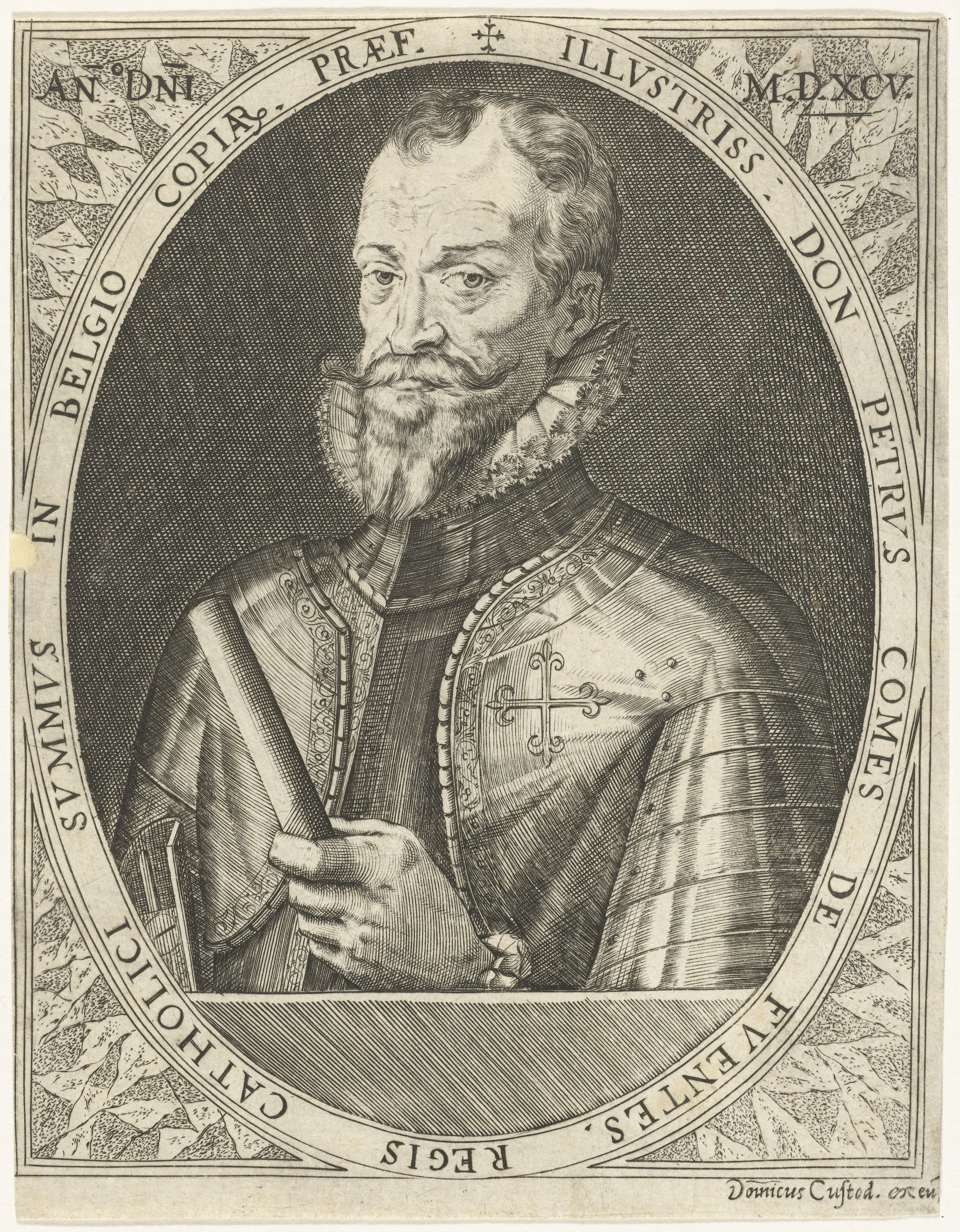
The Count of Fuentes becomes acting Governor General of the Spanish Netherlands (1595)

Events of 1595 in the Spanish Netherlands and Prince-Bishopric of Liège, predecessor states of modern Belgium.

== Incumbents ==
=== Habsburg Netherlands ===
Monarch

- Philip II, King of Spain and Duke of Brabant, of Luxembourg, etc.

Governor General

- Archduke Ernest of Austria (to 20 February); Pedro Henriquez de Acevedo, Count of Fuentes (acting)

=== Prince-Bishopric of Liège ===
Prince-Bishop

- Ernest of Bavaria

== Events ==
The Army of Flanders takes Cambrai (1595)

Huy retaken from the Dutch by the forces of the Prince-Bishop of Liège

- 17 January – Henry IV of France declares war on Spain and the Spanish Netherlands.
- 13 February – Ernest of Austria orders the expulsion of Frenchmen as enemy aliens
- 7 to 20 March – Siege of Huy
- 11 April – City of Antwerp prohibits pigs running free in the city
- 2 May – Albert VII of Austria, viceroy of Portugal, named Governor General of the Habsburg Netherlands.
- 8 May – City of Antwerp prohibits the nocturnal use of hooded lanterns on the city's streets.
- 26 June – City of Antwerp prohibits the operation of dancing schools, fencing schools and bowling greens on Sundays.
- 9 September – Royal decree allowing trade with the enemy under licence
- 9 October – Army of Flanders takes Cambrai
- 14 October – Loss and retaking of Lier
- 17 November – Royal decree concerning the settlement of Frenchmen in the Low Countries.
- 14 December – Justus Lipsius appointed historiographer royal.
- 28 December – Ernest of Bavaria appoints André Streignart, Jean Chapeauville, Pierre Oranus, and Jean Malempeter to an inquisitorial witchcraft tribunal to investigate and judge the case of Jean Delvaux, a monk of Stavelot Abbey who had voluntarily confessed to attending gatherings of witches.

== Art and architecture ==
House De Wolvinne ("The She-Wolf") on Antwerp main square

- House De Wolvinne on Antwerp's main square.

== Publications ==
- Jean de Castro, Harmonie joyeuse et delectable, contenant aucunes stanzes et chansons a quatre parties (Antwerp, Pierre II Phalèse and Jean Bellère)
- Franciscus Costerus, Bewijs der ouder catholijcker leeringhe met antwoorde op sommighe teghenstellinghen (Antwerp, Joachim Trognaesius)
- Martín de Eguiluz, Milicia, discurso y regla militar (Antwerp, Petrus Bellerus)
- Bernardino de Escalante, Dialogos del arte militar (Brussels, Rutger Velpius)
- Jan Franco, Almanach oft journael voor het jaer M.D.XCV (Antwerp, Arnout Coninx)
- Luís Fróis, Lettre du Japon des années 1591 et 1592, translated by Michel d'Esne (Douai, Jean Bogard)
- Mathias Lambrecht, Historia ecclesiastica oft een kerckelicke historie (Antwerp, Jan van Keerberghen)
- Justus Lipsius, De militia Romana libri quinque: commentarius ad Polybium (Antwerp, Plantin Press)
- Jacques Marchant, Flandria commentariorum libri IIII descripta (Antwerp, Plantin Press)
- Joannes Molanus, Natales sanctorum Belgii, edited by Henricus van Cuyck (Leuven, Joannes Masius and Philippus Zangrius)
- Thomas Sailly, Verscheyden litanien tot ghebruyck des catholijken leghers, ende alle godtvruchtige menschen (Antwerp, Plantin Press)
- Thomas Stapleton, Promptuarium catholicum super evangelia de festis sanctorum totius anni (Antwerp, Pierre Bellère)
- Cornelius Columbanus Vrancx, Hondert ende viftich vraghen en andtwoorden, nae het ghetal van Davids psalmen (Ghent, Gauthier Manilius)

News pamphlets

- Articles accordez par le roy pour la trefve generale du royaume (Antwerp, Guillaume Stroobant)
- Articulen gheaccordeert byden coninck van Naverre, raeckende t'generael bestandt van Vranckrijck (Antwerp, Jan III van Ghelen)
- Brief recit de l'entreprinse et saisissement de la ville de Liere (Antwerp, Anthoni de Ballo)
- Brief traicte de la victoire que le compte Charles de Mansfelt à l'encontre du Turc devant la ville de Strigoine, a par la grace de dieu obtenu (Antwerp, Arnout Coninx)
- Certaines nouvelles de la bonne et heureuse victoire que par l'ayde de Dieu, le comte Charles de Mansfelt a obtenu en Honguerie, pres la ville de Strigonia (Brussels, Rutger Velpius)
- Cort verhael van den aenslach ende veroveren der stadt van Liere, geschiet den XIV octob. MDXCV
- Discours de la bataille, siege et prise des ville et chasteau de Dourlens (Arras, Guillaume de la Rivière)
- Discours de plusieurs sanglantes et signalees victoires obtenues par sa majesté imperiale contre les Turcs en Hongrie (Arras, Guillaume de la Rivière)
- Discours ende warachtich verhael van het inne nemen van de stadt van Liere door den vyant, op den XIIII. dach van Octob. int jaer M.D.XCV. ende hoe de selve wederom is in genomen gheweest op den zelven dach (Brussels, Rutger Velpius)
- Discours veritable de la rendition de la ville & du chasteau de Cambray, entre les mains du Roy catholique d'Espagne par le victorieux Seigneur le conte de Fuentes (Brussels, Rutger Velpius)
- Nouvelle et veritable liste et denombrement des seigneurs et gentil-hommes de marque morts, prisonniers et blessez, à la prise dez ville et chasteau de Dourlens (Arras, Guillaume de la Rivière)
- Relation veritable du succes de la guerre de sa majesté imperiale au royaume d'Honguerie apres le trespas de Charles de Mansfelt (Brussels, Rutger Velpius)

== Births ==
- 18 October – Lucas van Uden, artist (died 1672)

Date uncertain

- Philippe de Buyster, sculptor (died 1688)
- Paul de Vos, painter (died 1678)
- Geronimo Gerardi, artist (died 1648)
- Lucas Vorsterman the Elder, engraver (died 1675)

== Deaths ==
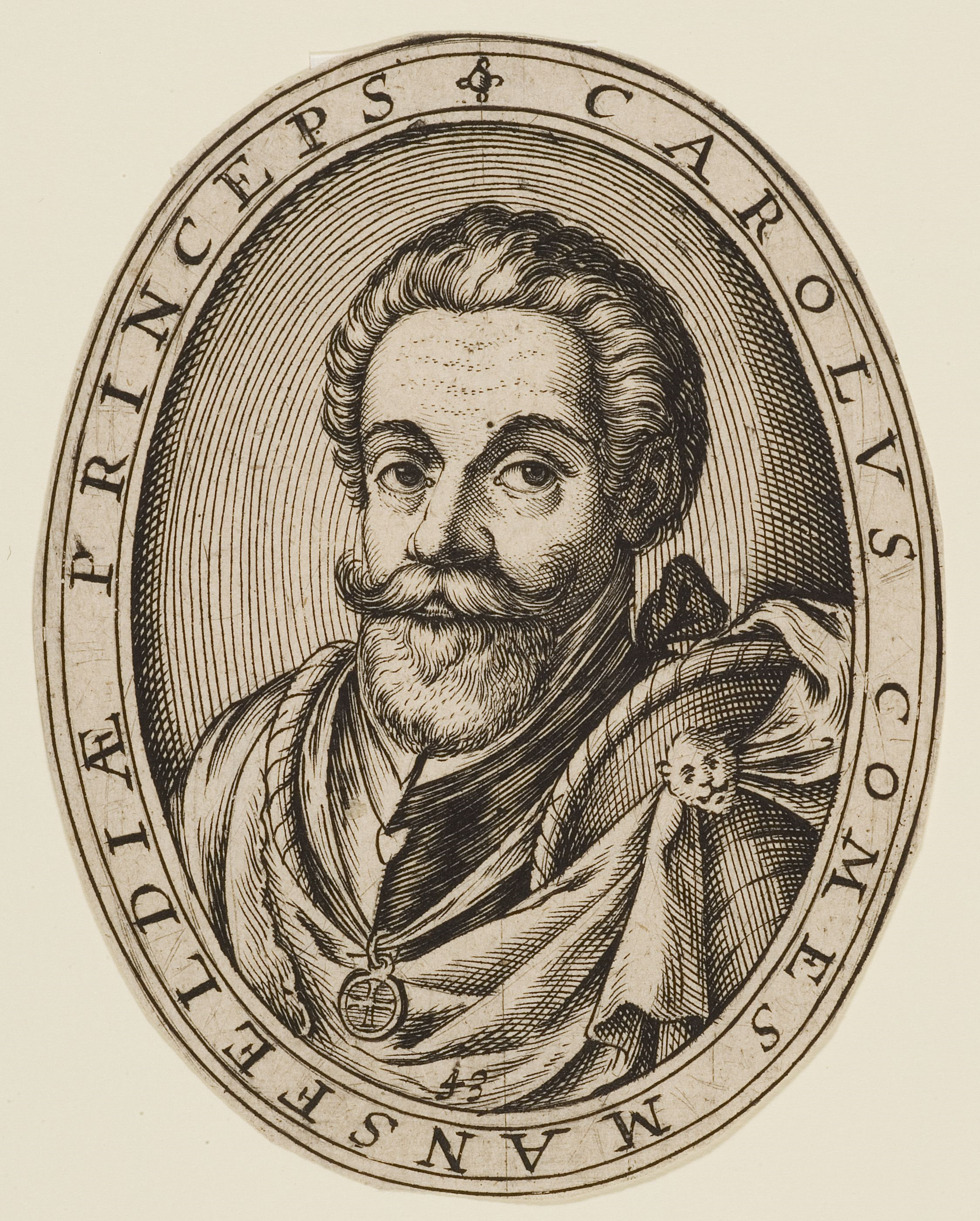
Charles, Count of Mansfeld (died 24 August 1595)

- 3 February – Cornelius Loos (born 1546), priest
- 20 February - Archduke Ernest of Austria (born 1553), Governor General
- 3 March – Jean Dave (born 1531), bishop of Namur
- 26 April – Laevinus Torrentius (born 1525), bishop of Antwerp
- 29 April – Ludovicus Episcopius (born c. 1520), composer
- 5 July – Jan van der Burch (date of birth unknown), office-holder
- 24 August – Charles, Count of Mansfeld (born 1543), general
- 14 September – Josyne van Beethoven (born c. 1540), victim of the witch craze
- 22 September – Francisco Verdugo (born 1537), commander
- 19 November – Hubert Waelrant (born c. 1517), composer
- 11 December – Philippe III de Croÿ (born 1526), aristocrat

Date uncertain

- Gauthier Morberius (date of birth unknown), printer
- Jan van der Noot (born 1539), poet
