= 1594 in Belgium =

- Decades
- See also: Other events of 1594; List of years in Belgium

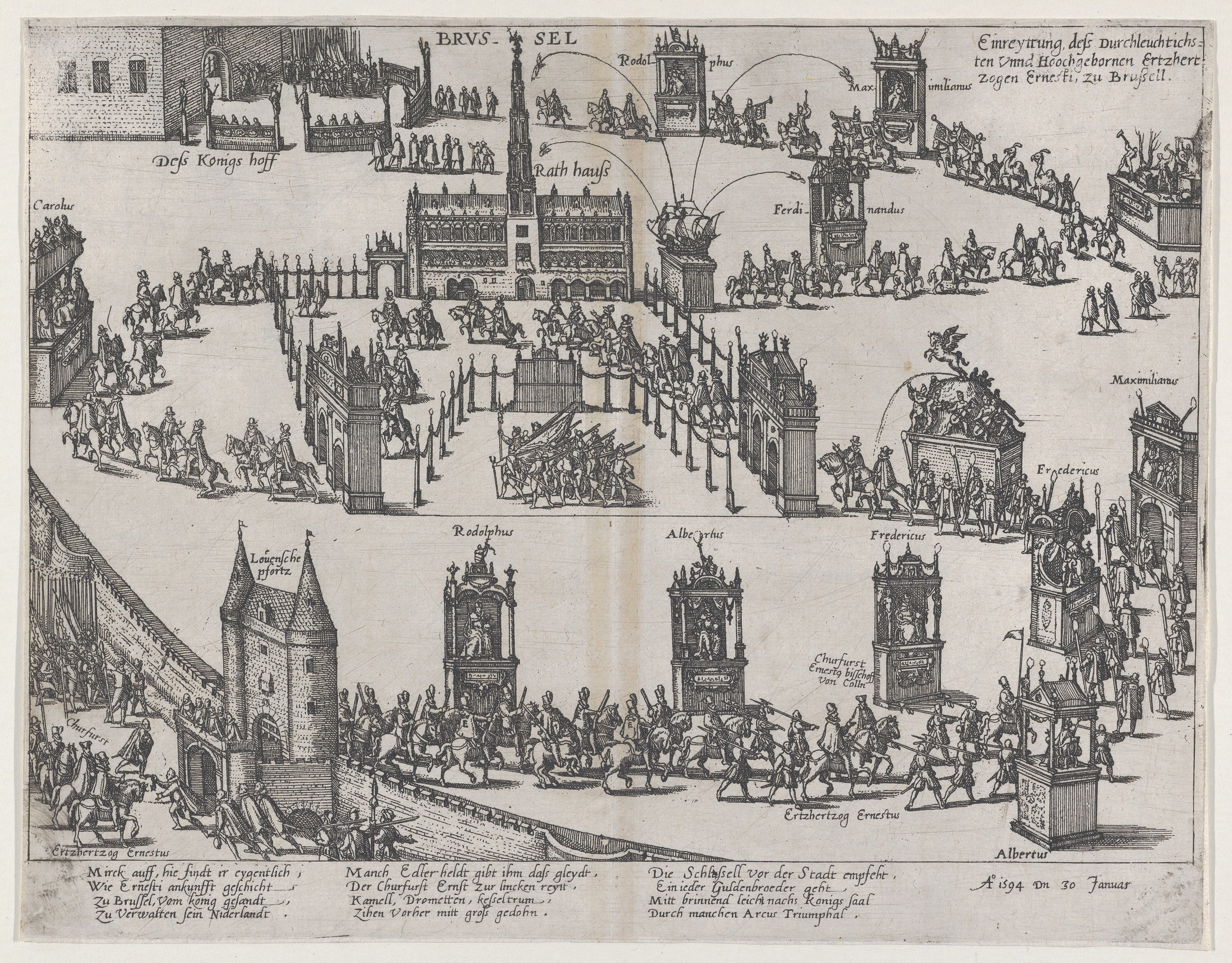
Archduke Ernest makes his joyous entry into Brussels, 30 January 1594

Events of 1594 in the Spanish Netherlands and Prince-Bishopric of Liège, predecessor states of modern Belgium.

== Incumbents ==
=== Habsburg Netherlands ===
Monarch

- Philip II, King of Spain and Duke of Brabant, of Luxembourg, etc.

Governor General

- Archduke Ernest of Austria

=== Prince-Bishopric of Liège ===
Prince-Bishop

- Ernest of Bavaria

== Events ==
- 30 January – Joyous Entry into Brussels and Antwerp of Archduke Ernest of Austria
- 4 February – City of Antwerp prohibits pigs foraging in the streets
- 27 May – States General of the Dutch Republic reject Archduke Ernest's peace overtures
- July – Beginning of a two-year mutiny of Italian troops in the Army of Flanders at Zichem in the Duchy of Brabant
- 22 July – Army of Flanders fails to relieve Siege of Groningen, leading to the city's surrender
- 23 August – City of Antwerp prohibits the keeping of brothels outside the Lepelstraat
- 23 October – Jean Dave installed as bishop of Namur.
- 30 October – City of Antwerp tightens prohibition on children's street-fighting
- 12 December – To combat dearth, the City of Antwerp prohibits forestalling on the grain market

== Art and architecture ==
Maerten de Vos, The Temptation of St Anthony (1594) – now in the Royal Museum of Fine Arts Antwerp

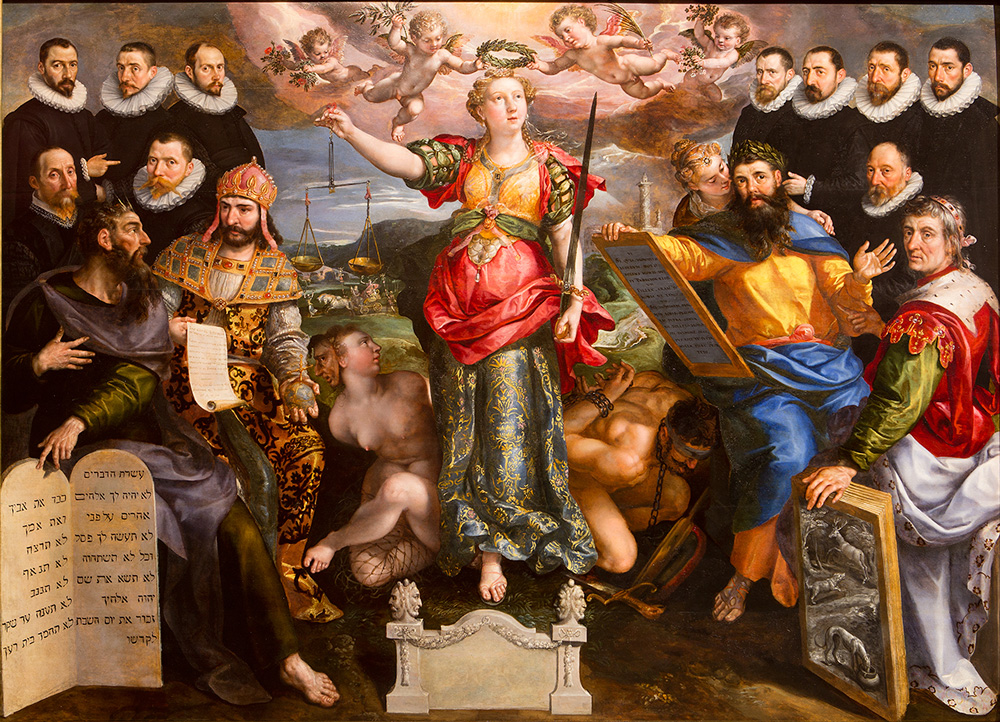
Maerten de Vos, The Tribunal of the Brabant Mint in Antwerp (1594) — now in the Snijders&Rockox House

Paintings

- Hendrick de Clerck appointed court painter to Archduke Ernest
- Maerten de Vos, The Temptation of St Anthony (Royal Museum of Fine Arts Antwerp)
- Maerten de Vos, The Tribunal of the Brabant Mint in Antwerp (Snijders&Rockox House)

== Publications ==
- Henricus Adriani, Catholicke sermoonen oft verclaringhen op alle de epistelen vande sondaghen ende heylighe daghen vanden gheheelen jare (Antwerp, Hieronymus Verdussen)
- Claude de Bassecourt, Tragecomedie pastoralle et autres pieces (Antwerp, Arnout Coninx)
- Pierre Boaistuau, François de Belleforest, Claude de Tesserant, and Rod Hoyer, Histoires prodigieuses (Antwerp, Guislain Janssens)
- Jean de Cartheny, Le voyage du chevalier errant (Antwerp, Jean Bellère)
- Jean Chapeauville, Petit traité des vices et des vertus (Liège, Christian Ouwerx)
- Bernardino de Escalante, Dialogos del arte militar (Brussels, Rutger Velpius)
- Jan Franco, Ephemeris meteorologica. Groote prognosticatie, ende daghelijcksche beschrijvinghe van de wonderlijcke revolutien der gantscher werelt, van dit jaer ons H. M.D.XCIIII (Antwerp, Arnout Coninx)
- Lodovico Guicciardini, Les heures de recreation et apres-disnees, translated by François de Belleforest (Antwerp, Guislain Janssens)
- Franciscus Haraeus, Vitae sanctorum, ex probatissimis authoribus, brevi compendio summa fide collectae (Antwerp, Plantin Press
- Jacobus Hezius, Corte beschriivinghe van t'leven ende sterven vanden weerdigen Heer Martinus Duncanus, deken in den Haeghe (Antwerp, Hieronymus Verdussen)
- Jan Baptist Houwaert, Den willecome en congratulatie van Eernesto aertshertoghe van Oostenrijck (Brussels, Jan Mommaert)
- Jan Baptist Houwaert, Moralisatie op de comst vanden hooghgheboren, machtighen, en seer doorluchtighen vorst Ernesto: des roomschen keysers broeder, aertshertoghe van Oostenrijck, hertoge van Bourgundien (Brussel, Jan Mommaert)
- (Jesuit college, Antwerp), Serenissimo archiduci Ernesto, Belgii supremo gubernatori. Societatis Jesu juventus studiosa (Antwerp, Martinus II Nutius) — Latin and Greek compositions celebrating Archduke Ernest
- Justus Lipsius, De cruce libri tres ad sacram profanamque historiam utiles (Antwerp, Plantin Press)
- Giovanni Pietro Maffei, Les trois livres de la vie du Père Ignace de Loyole, translated by Michel d'Esne (Douai, Jean Bogard)
- Leon De Meyere, Prosopopee d'Anvers a la bienvenue du serenissime prince Erneste (Antwerp, Arnout Coninx), for which the author was awarded 13 florins 20 stivers on 12 July.
- Joannes Molanus, De Historia SS. Imaginum et Picturarum pro vero earum usu (Leuven, Jean Bogard)
- Jerónimo Nadal, Adnotationes et meditationes in evangelia quae in sacrosancto missae sacrificio toto anno leguntur (Antwerp, Martinus II Nutius)
- Michel de Nostradamus, Prognosticatie ende voorsegginge vanden jare ons heeren Jesu Christi. 1594. Ghemaeckt ende ghecalculeert op den meridiaen vande. XVII. Neerlanden (Antwerp, Widow of Willem van Parijs)
- Philip Numan, Het leven van die seer heylighe maghet S. Catherina van Senen (Brussels, Jan Thimon)
- Denis Peronnet, Sermons et exhortations catholicques sur les evangiles des cinquante et deux dimanches de l'annee (Antwerp, Jean Keerberghe)
- Denis Peronnet, Sermons et exhortations catholiques pour les festes de Jesus Christ et des sainctes, vol. 2 (Antwerp, Willem Stroobant)
- Pedro de Ribadeneyra, Historia ecclesiastica del scisma del reyno de Inglaterra (Antwerp, Martinus II Nutius)
- Louis Richeome, L'adieu de l'ame devote laissant le corps (Arras, Guillaume de la Rivière)
- Laevinus Torrentius, Poemata sacra (Antwerp, Plantin Press)
- Jan van der Noot, De poetische werken (Antwerp, Daniel Vervliet)
- Jan van der Noot, Op de gheluckighe ende heerlijke in-koomste Ernesto van Oostenrijck. Sur l'heureuse et magnifique entree du prince Erneste, archeduc d'Austrice (Antwerp, Arnout Coninx), for which the author was awarded 16 florins in thanks on 12 July.
- Maximilien de Wignacourt, Serenissimi Ernesti adventum gratulatur Belgicae (Brussels, Jan Mommaert), for which the author was awarded 15 florins in thanks on 26 March.

Legislation

- Chartres et coustumes locales de la ville de Binch. Avec la reformation de plusieurs articles (Mons, Charles Michel)
- Placcaet, ordonnancie ende instructie, op het ruymen ende cuysschen vander rivieren vander sennen (Brussels, Rutger Velpius)

Music

- Jean Desquesnes, Madrigali, il primo libro a cinque voci (Antwerp, Pierre Phalèse & Jean Bellère)
- Giovanni Battista Galeno, Il primo libro de madrigali a cinque voci (Antwerp, Pierre Phalèse & Jean Bellère)
- Luca Marenzio, Madrigali a sei voci, in un corpo ridotti (Antwerp, Pierre Phalèse & Jean Bellère)
- Peter Philips, Melodia olympica di diversi eccellentissimi musici
- Jan Pieterszoon Sweelinck, Chansons à cinc parties (Antwerp, Pierre Phalèse & Jean Bellère)
- Hubert Waelrant, Symphonia angelica di diversi eccellentissimi musici a IIII, V et VI voci (Antwerp, Pierre Phalèse & Jean Bellère)

News pamphlets and prints

- Copie des lettres envoiees a monseigneur le baron de Billy gouverneur de Lille, Douay et Orchies touchant la grande et heureuse et memorable victoire de l'armée de sa majesté impérialle contre les Turcs et Hongres (Douai, Jean Bogard)
- Descriptio et explicatio pegmatum, arcuum et spectaculorum, quae Bruxellae Brabantiae pridie calendas februarii anno MDXCIIII exhibita fuere, sub ingressum serenissimi principis Ernesti, Dei gratia archiducis Austriae (Brussels, Jan Mommaert)
- La resolution d'onze docteurs de la Sorbonne de Paris assamblez en la ville d'Amiens (Arras, Guillaume de la Rivière)
- Een schoon dialogus oft t'samen-sprekinghe tusschen Belgica ende Hope tot Peys, tracterende ter eeren vanden hooghgheboren vorst Ernesto (Antwerp, Arnout Coninx)
- Warachtich verhael van de groote tyrannye des groeten Turcqs (Liège, Léonard de Streel)

== Births ==
- 6 August – Gerard Douffet, painter (died 1660)

Date uncertain

- Antoon Sallaert, painter (died 1650)

== Deaths ==
- 12 May – Remi Drieux (born 1519), bishop of Bruges
- 14 June – Orlando di Lasso (born c. 1532), composer
- 17 July – Willem Bloys van Treslong (born 1529), nobleman
- 24 August – William Reynolds (born c. 1544, theologian
- 16 October – William Allen (born 1532), Cardinal
- 4 November – Petrus Opmeer (born 1526), historian
- 2 December – Gerardus Mercator (born 1512), cartographer

Date uncertain

- Petrus van der Aa (born 1530), jurist
- Pierre de Melun (born c. 1550), nobleman
