= 1601 in Belgium =

- Decades
- See also: Other events of 1601; List of years in Belgium

Events in the year 1601 in the Spanish Netherlands and Prince-bishopric of Liège (predecessor states of modern Belgium).

== Incumbents ==
=== Habsburg Netherlands ===
Sovereigns – Archdukes Albert and Isabella

=== Prince-Bishopric of Liège ===
Prince-Bishop – Ernest of Bavaria

== Events ==
- Mark de Cooman and Frank van der Planken establish a tapestry manufactory in Oudenaarde.

January

- 3 January – States of Brabant agree an exceptional additional subsidy of 60,000 Brabant guilders for one year, to be levied as a sales tax from wine merchants, brewers, butchers and bakers, and to be used to pay troops garrisoned in Brabant.
- 16 January – New regulations for trading on the Stock Exchange in Antwerp decreed.

March

- 20 March – New regulations on distilleries for brandy and aqua vitae decreed.

April

- 13 April – Export prohibition for saltpetre and gunpowder.

May

- 12 May – Proclamation regulating hunting in the County of Flanders
- 21 May – As Duke and Duchess of Luxembourg, the Archdukes Albert and Isabella conclude an agreement with Ernest of Bavaria, Prince-Bishop of Liège, concerning their rights of patronage over the Princely Abbey of Stavelot-Malmedy.

June

- 12 June – Maurice of Nassau lays siege to Rheinberg.

July

- 4 July – Archduke Albert applies to the States of Flanders, in session in Bruges, for a "half hundredth penny" (a tax of 0.5%) to finance the Siege of Ostend.
- 5 July – Siege of Ostend begins.
- 10 July – Archduke Albert personally leads an assault on the defences of Ostend.
- 15 July – Sir Francis Vere arrives in Ostend with reinforcements.

August

- 16 August – High tides at Ostend flood trenches.

November

- 2 November – Maurice of Nassau lays siege to 's-Hertogenbosch.
- 13 November – City of Antwerp prohibits gambling on the outcome of military campaigns.
- 22 November – Maurice of Nassau abandons the siege of 's-Hertogenbosch.

== Publications ==
- anon., Les annales du Japon, de la Chine, et de Mogor (Liège, Art de Coerswarem)
- anon., Histoire dès guérisons admirables qui par la grâce divine sont advenues en Dinant, l’an 1599 (Liège, Christian Ouwerx)
- anon., Verhael van een tsamen-sprekinge, gehouden tusschen een courtisan oft hovelinck ende een borgere, nopende den tegenwoordighen staet van Nederlant (Leuven, Joannes Masius)
- anon., Translat de certain placart publie a Londres le 9. de Febvrier 1601 Touchant l'invasion & interpriase des Contes de Essex, Rutland & Southamton, avec leurs adherens (Brussels, Rutger Velpius)
- Franciscus Costerus, Catholijcke sermoonen, op de evangelien der sondaghen vanden advent to den vasten (Antwerp, no address)
- Henricus van Cuyck, Speculum concubinariorum (Leuven, Joannes Masius)
- Etienne Du Tronchet, Lettres missives et familières, avec le monologue de la Providence Divine au peuple français (Douai, Jean Bogard)
- Jan Franco, Ephemeris metheorologica. Seer schoone beschrijvinge van de revolutien ende inclinatien des iaers ons Heeren 1601 voor de princelijcke stadt van Bruessel (Antwerp, Arnout Conincx)
- Jan Franco, Kalender oft journael, voor het iaer ons Heeren M.D.CI. dienende voor den 7. climaet. Met die dagelijcxsche getijden der vaert van Brussel naer Antwerpen: oft van daer wederom voor de princelijcke stadt van Bruessel (Antwerp, Arnout Conincx)
- Justus Lipsius, Epistolarum selectarum centuria singularis ad Italos & Hispanos (Antwerp, Plantin Press)
- Justus Lipsius, Epistolarum selectarum III. centuriae (Antwerp, Plantin Press)
- Nicolas de Montmorency, Spiritualis dulcedo quatuor libris (Leuven, Gerard Rivius)
- Abraham Ortelius, Epitome theatri orbis terrarum (Antwerp, Jan van Keerberghen)
- Abraham Ortelius, Theatrum orbis terrarum (Antwerp, Plantin Press)
- Antonio Ortiz, A relation of the solemnetie wherewith the Catholike princes K. Phillip the III. and Quene Margaret were receyued in the Inglish Colledge of Valladolid the 22. of August, 1600, translated by Francis Rivers (Antwerp, Arnout Coninx)
- Andres de Soto, Contemplacion del crucifixo, y consideraciones de Christo crucificado (Antwerp, Plantin Press)
- Alessandro Valignano, Japponia & China, scriptae 10. octobris 1599 (Antwerp, Joachim Trognaesius)
- Richard Verstegan, Odes in imitation of the seaven penitential psalmes, with sundry other poemes and ditties tending to devotion and pietie (Antwerp, Arnold Conincx)
- Cornelius Columbanus Vrancx, Den troost der zielen (Ghent, Gauthier Manilius)

== Births ==
- 21 June – Godfrey Henschen, hagiographer (died 1681)
- 13 September – Jan Brueghel the Younger, painter (died 1678)

date uncertain

- Nicolas de Liemaker, painter (died 1646)
- Frans Ykens, painter (died 1693)

== Deaths ==
- 10 May – Hans van Steenwinckel the Elder (born c. 1550), architect
- 24 July – Joris Hoefnagel (born 1542), printmaker
- 28 September (burial) – Aert Mijtens (born c. 1541), painter

date uncertain

- Jacobus Typotius (born 1540), humanist
