= Robert Turner (divine) =

Anglo-Scottish Roman Catholic priest

Robert Turner (died 28 November 1599) was a Scottish Catholic divine.

== Biography ==
Turner was descended from a Scottish family, was born at Barnstaple, Devonshire. He was educated for a time at Exeter College, Oxford, and at Christ's College, Cambridge, whence he matriculated in 1567, but left each university without a degree. In after years he said: "Non ego nunc, ut anteà, ætatem meam in nugis (ne quid gravius dicam) Oxonii apud homines hæreseos crimine obstrictos, neque in fabulis domi apud homines nulla politiori literatura excultos, otiosè, turpiter, nequiter contererem". Leaving his country and parents on account of his attachment to the Roman Catholic religion, he went in 1572 to the English College at Douai, where he became professor of rhetoric, and was ordained priest in 1574. In 1576 he went to Rome, and taught the classics for several years in the German College. He states that he was a pupil of Edmund Campion, but whether at Oxford or Rome does not appear. He was never himself, as has been sometimes stated, a member of the Society of Jesus.

Turner was for some time prefect of studies at the college of Eichstadt in Bavaria; and, after many journeys and services undertaken for the Roman Catholic cause, he was, by the influence of Cardinal Allen, appointed professor of eloquence and ethics in the Georgian College at Ingolstadt, where he was created D.D. Subsequently, he became rector of that university. He was also nominated one of the privy council to William, duke of Bavaria; but, incurring that prince's displeasure, he retired for a time to Paris. A year or two later he returned to Germany, and was made canon of Breslau in Silesia, and afterwards secretary for the Latin tongue to the Archduke Ferdinand, who had an especial esteem for him. He died at Grätz in Styria on 28 Nov. 1599. His friend Pits describes him as "vir in litteris politioribus et philosophia plus quam vulgariter doctus, et in familiari congressu satis superque facetus".

== Works ==
- "Sermo Panegyricus de Divi Gregorii Nazianzeni corpore … translato," Ingolstadt, 1584, 8vo.
- "Sermo Panegyricus de Triumpho, quo Bavariæ Dux Ernestus, Archiepiscopus Coloniensis et Sacri Romani Imperii per Italiam Archicancellarius, Princeps Elector fuit inauguratus Episcopus Leodiensis,’ Ingolstadt, 1584, 8vo.
- "Commentationes tres: (1) In illud Matthæi 23, Ecce mitto ad vos Prophetas, &c.; (2) In illud Actorum 2, Et factus est repente de cœlo sonus, &c.; (3) In illud Johannis 1, Miserunt Judæi ab Hierosolymis, ut interrogarent eum, &c." Ingolstadt, 1584, 8vo.
- Maria Stuarta, regina Scotiæ, Dotaria Franciæ, hæres Angliæ et Hyberniæ, martyr Ecclesiae, Innocens à cæde Darleana. Ingolstadt, 1587. Available on Google Books.
- Turner, Robert (1580). Roberti Tvrneri Devonii. Oratio et Epistola de Vita et Morte Reverendissimi Et Illvstrissimi Dn. Martini A Schavmberg, Principis & Episcopi Eystadiani: illa in funere 3. Non. Iul. An. 1590. Eystadii habita: haec scripta Romam ad Reverendissimum et Illustrissimum Dn. Gvlielmvm Alanum S. R. E. Cardinalem. Subnexum estclarissimi vir D. Philippi Menzelii, Medicinae Doctoris et Profssoris Ingolstadtiani carmen de eadem re elegantissimum (in Latin). Ingolstadt: Wolfgangi Ederi.(sic; vere 1590)
- "Epistolæ aliquot," Ingolstadt, 1584, 8vo, dedicated to Cardinal Allen; another edition, 'additis centuriis duabus posthumis,’ appeared at Cologne, 1615, 8vo.
- "Funebris Oratio in Principem Estensem," Antwerp, 1598.
- "Roberti Turneri Devonii Angli … Posthuma … Omnia nunc primum è m. s. edita," Ingolstadt, 1602, 8vo.
- "Oratio de laude Ebrietatis, tempore Bacchanalium habita Duaci," in "Dornavii Amphitheatrum Sapientiæ Socraticæ Jocoso-Seriæ," Hanover, 1619, fol. vol. ii. p. 38.
- A collected edition of Turner's works, containing several pieces not known to have been separately issued, was published as "Roberti Turneri Devonii Oratoris et Philosophi Ingolstadiensis Panegyrici duo," Ingolstadt, 1609, 8vo. A more complete collection was published at Cologne, 1615, 8vo.
