= 1599 in Belgium =

- Decades
- See also: Other events of 1599; List of years in Belgium

Events of 1599 in the Spanish Netherlands and Prince-Bishopric of Liège, predecessor states of modern Belgium.

== Incumbents ==
=== Habsburg Netherlands ===
Monarchs

- Isabella Clara Eugenia and Albert VII, Archduke of Austria, co-sovereigns

=== Prince-Bishopric of Liège ===
Prince-Bishop

- Ernest of Bavaria

== Events ==
- 9 February – Brussels government prohibits trade with the Dutch Republic
- 18 April – Marriage of Isabella Clara Eugenia and Archduke Albert
- 5 September – Joyous Entry into Brussels of Isabella Clara Eugenia and Archduke Albert

== Art and architecture ==
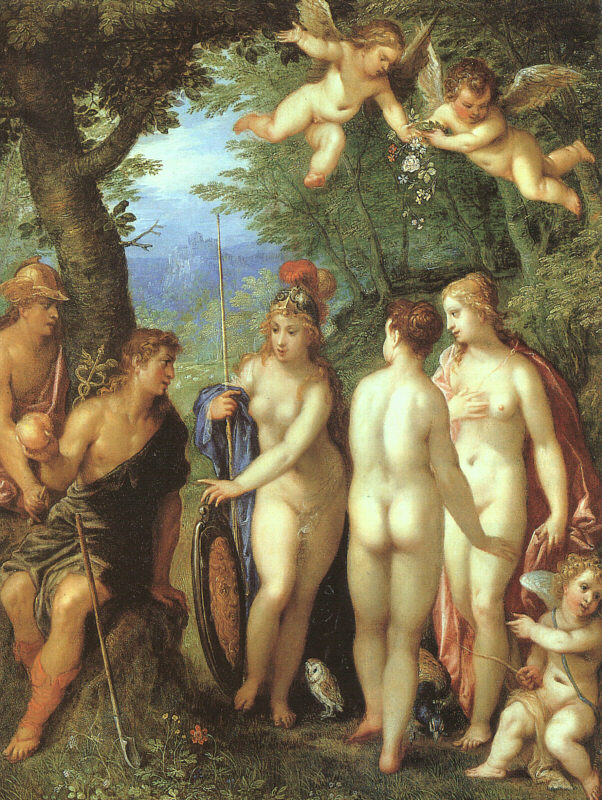
Hendrick van Balen the Elder, The Judgement of Paris, 1599 (Gemäldegalerie, Berlin)

- Hendrick van Balen the Elder, The Judgement of Paris

== Publications ==
- [anonymous], D'leven vande h. maghet Clara, eerste plantken der clarissen (Leuven, Laurence Kellam)
- Henricus Adriani, Catholike sermoonen op alle de epistelen ende evangelien vanden geheelen jare (Antwerp, Hieronymus Verdussen)
- Jan Bernaerts, Ad P. Statii Papinii silvarum libros, commentarius (Antwerp, Plantin Press)
- Jacques Blaseus, Sermon funebre faict aux funerailles du trescatholique, treshault et trespuisant prince et monarque Philippe II (Brussels, Rutger Velpius)
- Jan Franco, Ephemeris metheorologica practica. Seer schoone ende generale beschrijvinghe dan de vier deelen des jaers, met particuliere declaratie van de 12. maenden vanden jare 1599 (Antwerp, Arnout Coninx)
- Henricus Hornkens, Recueil de dictionnaires françoys, espagnols et latins (Brussels, Rutger Velpius)
- Cornelis Kiliaan, Etymologicum Teutonicae linguae, sive dictionarium Teutonico-Latinum (Antwerp, Plantin Press)
- Justus Lipsius, Poliorcetikon sive, de machinis, tormentis, telis (Antwerp, Plantin Press)
- Luis de Granada, A Spiritual Doctrine Conteining a Rule to Live Wel (Leuven, Laurence Kellam)
- Peter Philips, Madrigali a otto voci, novamente ristampati (Antwerp, Petrus Phalesius the Younger)
- Cornelius Columbanus Vrancx, Der Catholijcker hemelschen, levenden, en levenmakenden wijn (Ghent, Gauthier Manilius)
- Diego de Yepes, Translat de la relation faicte en langue Espaignole par le Reverend Pere Confesseur de feu le Roy nostre Sire, de la forme de la derniere maladie & mort de sa dicte Ma.té, decedee si pieusement, & Chrestiennement en son monastere Royal de l'Escurial, le Dimenche XIII de Septembre, l'an M.D.XCVIII (Antwerp, Plantin Press) Reprinted in Arras by Guillaume de la Rivière

News pamphlets

- Brief discours du voyage et entrees faictes par la Royne d'Espagne en Italie, avecq les triumphes & pompes exhibees, tant en la ville de Ostia, Ferrare, Mantoue, Cremone, Milan, que es autres bourgades & villettes d'Italie. Ensemble la relation du voyage faict par le Serenissime Archiducq d'Austrice Albert en Allemaigne (Brussels, Rutger Velpius)
- Cort verhael, van de gheluckige victorie, die de christenen hebben ghecreghen teghen den Turck in Hongeryen (Antwerp, Anthoni de Ballo)
- Relation de l'espovantable inondation de la riviere du Tybre, advenue en la ville de Rome, & aux environs d'icelle, le 23. déc. 1598 (Brussels, Rutger Velpius)
- La tresheureuse entrée de la serenissime royne d'Espagne, Marguerite d'Austrice en la ville de Ferrare (Douai, Charles Boscard)

== Births ==
- 13 March – John Berchmans, student (died 1621)
- 22 March – Anthony van Dyck, artist (died 1641)
- 29 June – Anthoine Brun, diplomat (died 1654)
- 17 November – Pieter van Mol, painter (died 1650)

== Deaths ==
- 20 May – Louise Hanssens, abbess
- 27 October – Gillis Coignet (born c. 1542), painter

Date unknown

- Dominicus Lampsonius (born 1532), poet
