= Pontus de Huyter =

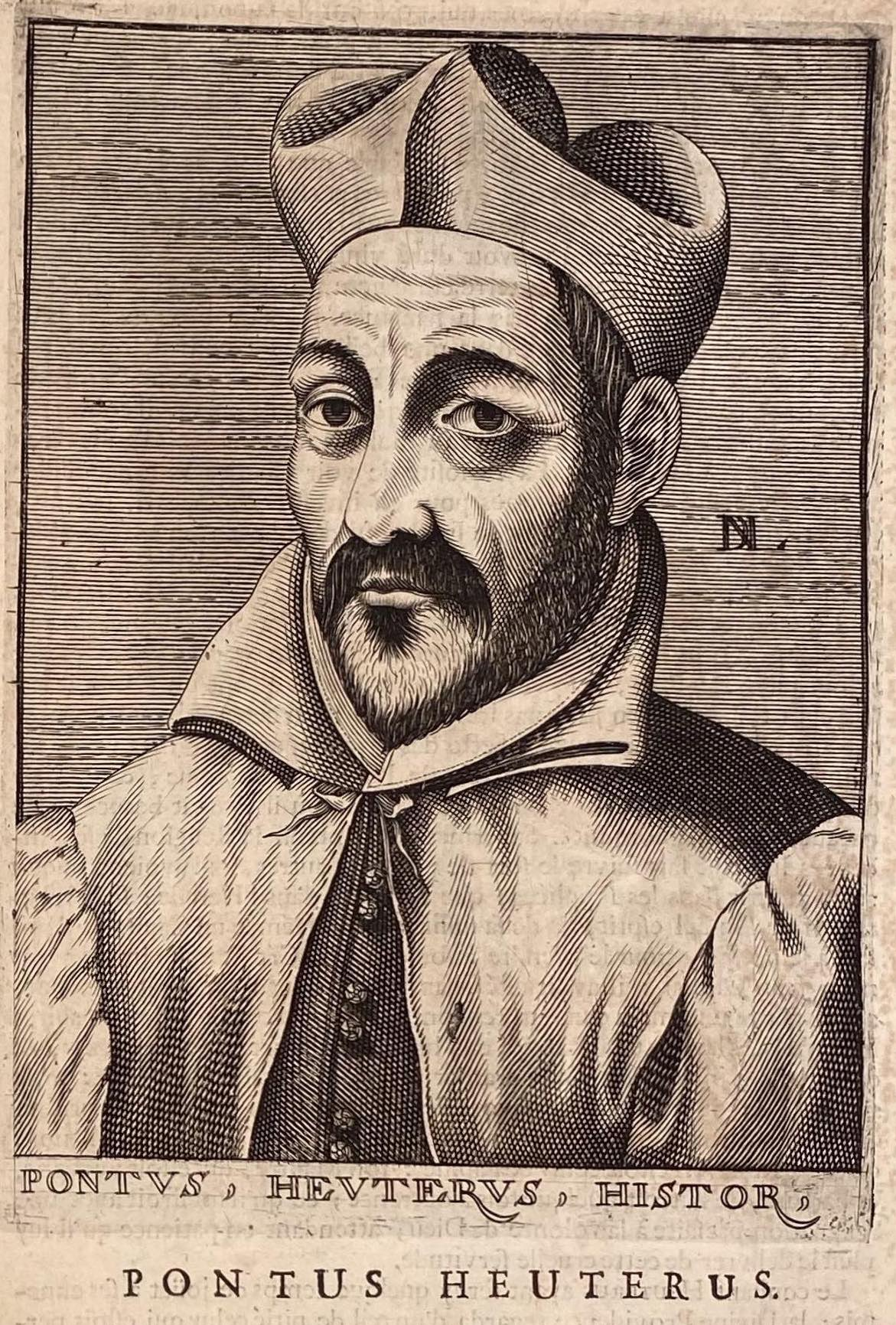
Portrait posthumously engraved by Nicolas de Larmessin, 1682

Pontus de Huyter (New Latin: Pontus Heuterus; 23 August 1535, Delft – 6 August 1602, Sint-Truiden) was a Dutch theologian, historian and humanist.

== Works ==
- Nederduytsche Orthographie (Antwerp: Plantyn, 1581)
- Rerum Burgundicarum libri (Antwerp: Plantyn, 1583)
- Rerum Belgicarum libri XV (Antwerp: Nutius, 1598)
- De Veterum ac sui saeculi Belgio libri II (Antwerp: Keerberg, 1600)

== Sources ==
- Wenzelburger, Karl Theodor (1880). "Heuterus, Pontus". Allgemeine Deutsche Biographie (ADB). Allgemeine Deutsche Biographie. Vol. 12. Leipzig: Duncker & Humblot. pp. 340–1.
