= William Barclay (writer) =

Scottish writer

William Barclay, M.D. (1570?–1630?) was a Scottish writer on miscellaneous subjects.

== Career ==
Barclay was a brother of Sir Patrick Barclay, of Towie, and was born about 1570 in Scotland. He was educated for the pursuit of medicine, but is best known by a pamphlet, printed in Edinburgh in 1614, and entitled Nepenthes, or the Vertues of Tobacco. Barclay studied at Louvain under the learned Justus Lipsius, to whom he afterwards addressed several letters which have been printed, and who is recorded to have said of his pupil "that if he were dying he knew no person on earth he would leave his pen to but the doctor". To Justus Lipsius' edition of Tacitus (Paris, 1599), Barclay contributed an appendix. At Louvain he appears to have taken the degrees of M.A. and M.D. He became professor of humanity in Paris University, and after a short interval, during which he practised medicine in Scotland, returned to France to pursue his former occupation at Nantes.

== Writings ==
The tract Nepenthes, or the Vertues of Tobacco, which is dedicated to the author's nephew Patrick, son and heir of Sir Patrick Barclay, of Towie, contains a warm panegyric on the herb, which, the author says, is adapted to cure all diseases when used with discretion, and "not, as the English abusers do, to make a smoke-box of their skull, more fit to be carried under his arm that selleth at Paris du noir à noircir to blacke men's shoes than to carry the braine of him that cannot walk, cannot ryde, except the tobacco pype be in his mouth". As in prose, so also in verse, Barclay sings the praises of his favourite weed, in six little poems attached to the treatise, and addressed to friends and kinsmen, all in praise of tobacco, to which he alludes as a "heavenlie plant", "the hope of healthe", "the fewell of our life", etc.

Two years after the appearance of Barclay's work, King James published his famous A Counterblaste to Tobacco, in which he denounced smoking as a "custome loathsome to the eye, hatefull to the nose, harmefull to the brain, dangerous to the lungs, and in the blacke stinking fume thereof nearest resembling the horrible stigian smoke of the pit that is bottomlesse". Barclay's tract is very rare, but has been reprinted by the Spalding Society.

He was also author of:

- Oratio pro Eloquentia. Ad v. cl. Ludovicum Servinum, Sacri Consistorii Regii Consiliarium, et in amplissimo Senatu Parisiensi Regis Advocatum, Paris, 1598
- Callirhoe, commonly called the well of Spa, or the Nymphe of Aberdene resuscitat, 1615 and 1670
- Apobaterium, or Last Farewell to Aberdeen (of which no copy is now known to exist)
- Judicium de Certamine G. Eglisemmii [Eglisham] cum G. Buchanano pro Dignitate Paraphraseos Psalmi ciiii. … Adjecta sunt Eglisemmii ipsum judicium, ut editum fuit Londini, typis Eduardi Aldæi, an. Dom. 1619, et in gratiam studiosæ juventutis ejusdem Psalmi elegans Paraphrasis Thomæ Rhædi, Lond. 1620, 8vo, London 1628
