= 1600 in Belgium =

- Decades
- See also: Other events of 1600; List of years in Belgium

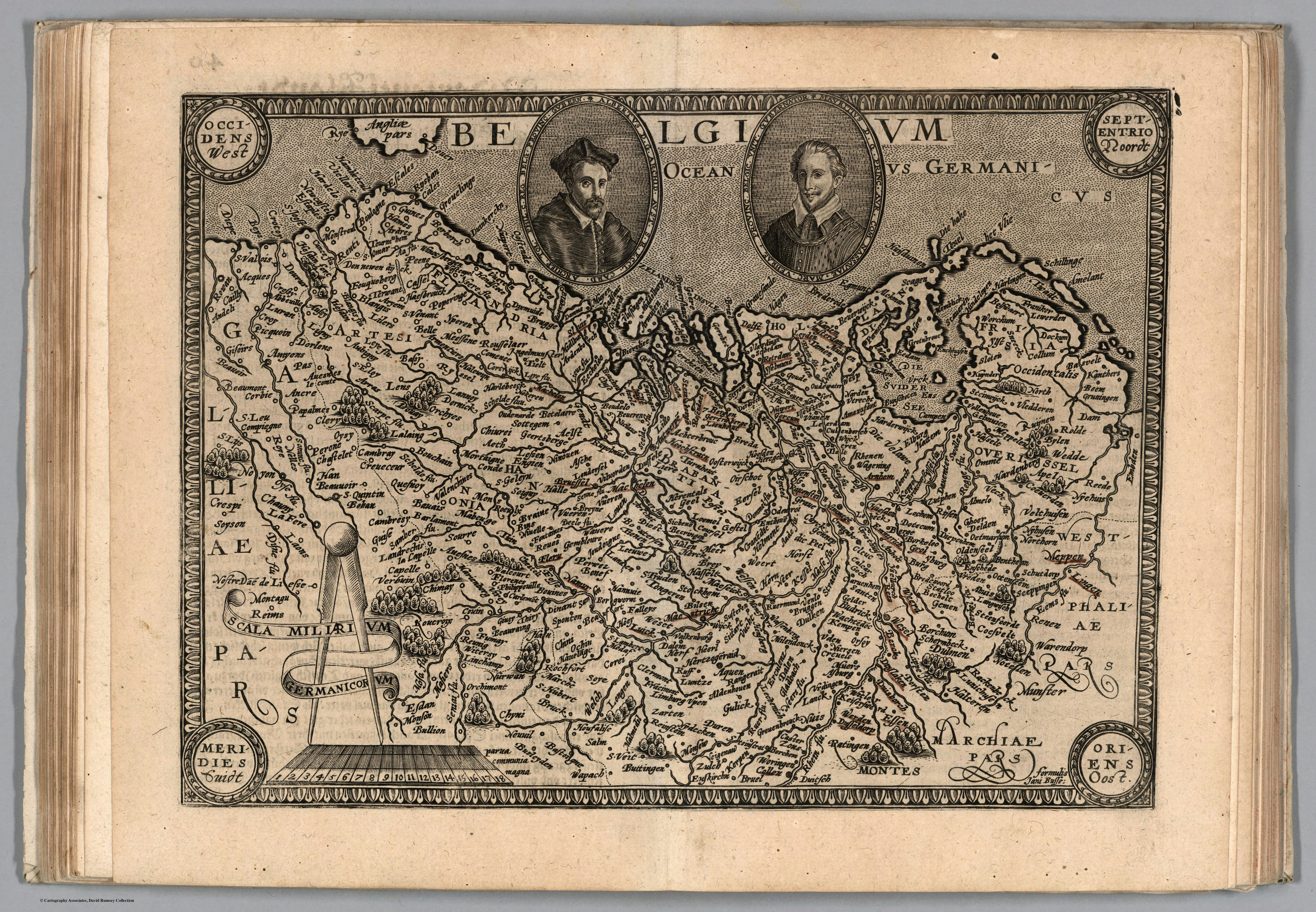
Belgium (Cologne, 1600)

Events in the year 1600 in the Spanish Netherlands and Prince-bishopric of Liège (predecessor states of modern Belgium).

== Incumbents ==
=== Habsburg Netherlands ===
Sovereigns – Archdukes Albert and Isabella

=== Prince-Bishopric of Liège ===
Prince-Bishop – Ernest of Bavaria

== Events ==
February

- 5 February — Battle of Lekkerbeetje

April

- 28 April — Estates General opens in Brussels (dissolved 9 November)

June

- 29 June – Archduchess Isabella addresses the Army of Flanders

July

- 2 July — Battle of Nieuwpoort

== Art and architecture ==
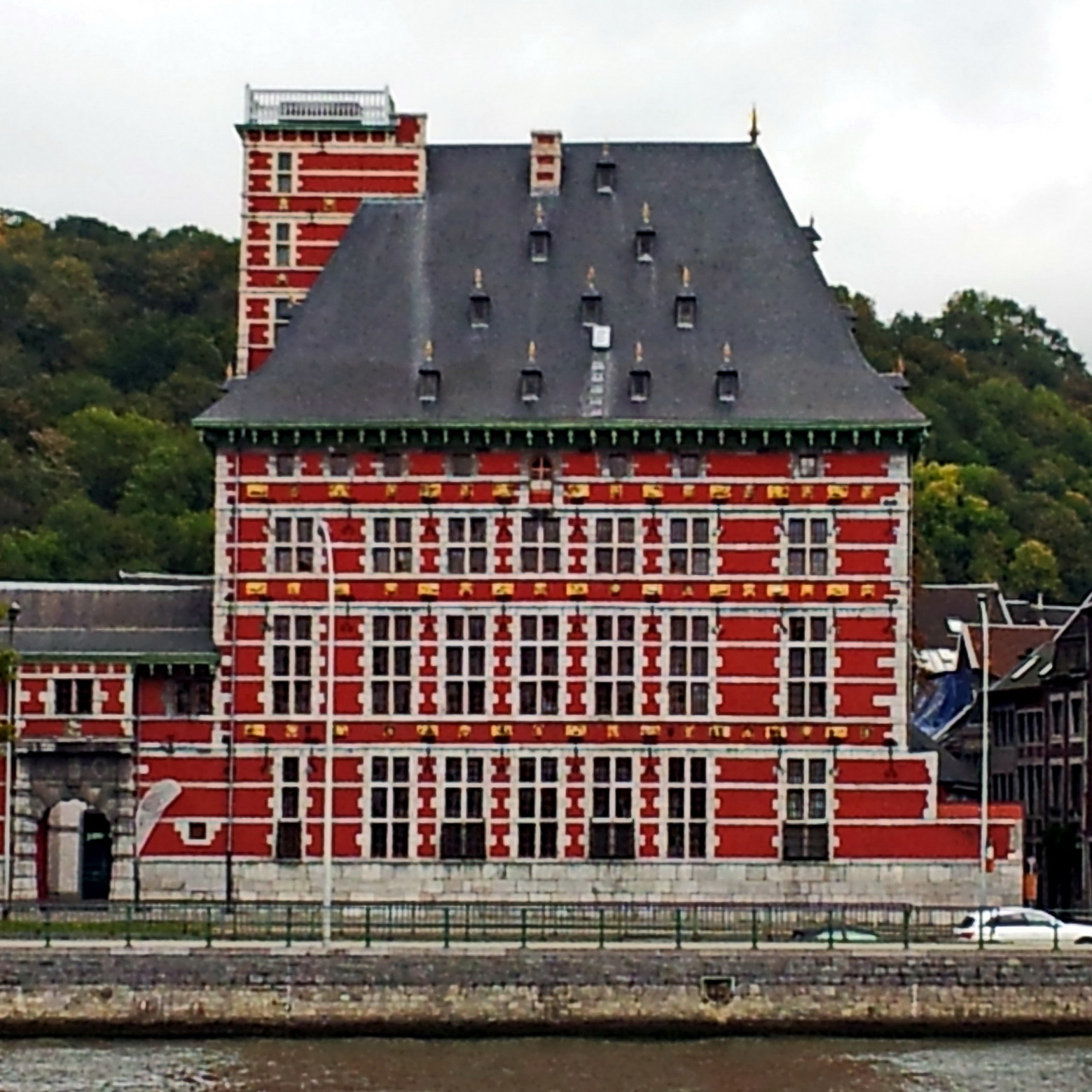
Curtius mansion in Liège

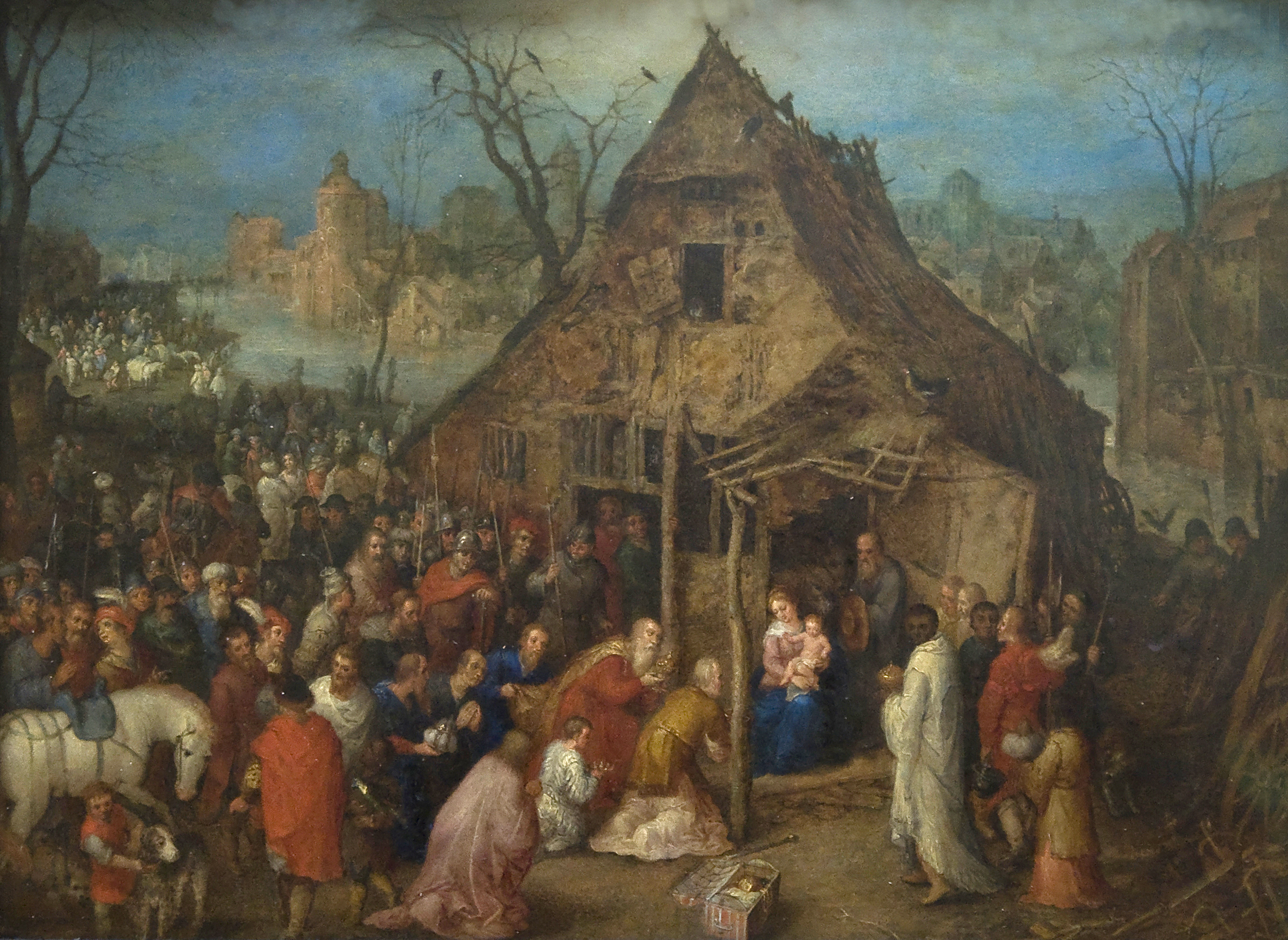
Jan Brueghel the Elder, Adoration of the Magi (c. 1600), now in the Royal Museum of Fine Arts Antwerp

Buildings

- Curtius mansion constructed in Liège.

Paintings

- Jan Brueghel the Elder, Adoration of the Magi (c. 1600), now in the Royal Museum of Fine Arts Antwerp

== Publications ==
- William Colson, L'arithmetique par practique tant es nombres entiers que nombres rompus. Joincte la maniere de diviser sans division par addition et soubstraction seule (Liège, Léonard Streel)
- Martin Delrio, Disquisitionum Magicarum, volumes 2 and 3 (Leuven, Gerard Rivius).
- Giulio Fazio, S.J., Van 't versterven der menschelijcker affectien, translated from Italian to Dutch by Thomas Sailly, S.J. (Antwerp, Joachim Trognaesius) – a treatise on mortification.
- Jean-Baptiste Gramaye, Andromede Belgica dicta Alberto Austriaco, Isabellae Clarae Eugeniae acta a Falconis alumnis, tertio ab inauguratis principibus die (Leuven, Laurence Kellam)
- John Hamilton, A facile traictise, contenand, first ane infallible reul to discerne trew from fals religion: nixt a declaration of the nature, numbre, vertew and effects of the sacraments togider with certaine prayeres of devotion (Leuven, Laurence Kellam)
- Francesco Petrarca, Le Petrarque en rime francoise, translated from Italian to French by Philippe de Maldeghem (Brussels, Rutger Velpius).
- Cornelius Columbanus Vrancx, Den spieghel oft practijcke der charitaten (Ghent, Gauthier Manilius) — a treatise on charity.
- Johannes Wamesius, Tractatus de appellationibus (Leuven, Gerard Rivius)

== Births ==
- 23 January — Alexander Keirincx, painter (d. 1652)
- 15 July — Jan Cossiers, painter (d. 1671)
- date uncertain – Albert de Ligne, Prince of Barbançon (d. 1674)

== Deaths ==
- 5 February — Gerard Abrahams, cavalry commander
- September
  - Jacques Colaert, privateer
  - Claude Le Jeune, composer
- 17 October — Cornelis de Jode, cartographer, engraver and publisher
- date uncertain
  - Volcxken Diericx, printmaker
  - Simon Pereyns, painter
