= Gilles De Haes =

Flemish general (1597–1657)

Gil De Haes
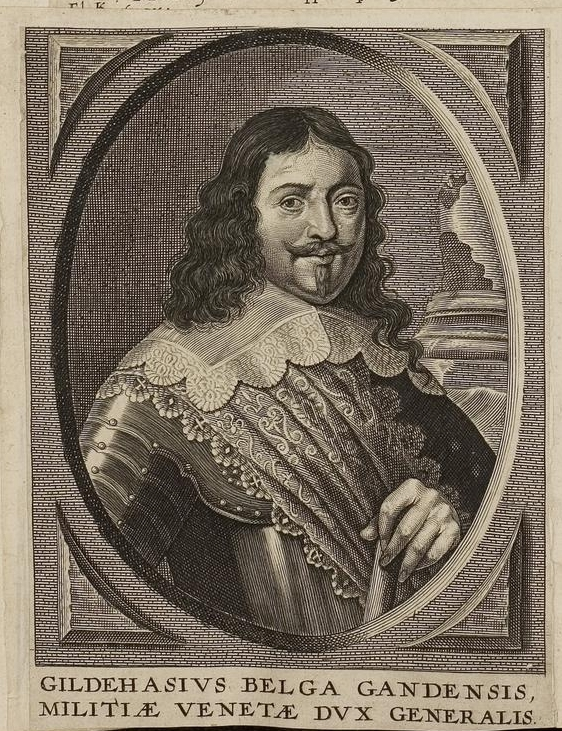
- Portrait of "Gildehasius" from the Arolsen Klebeband
- Born: 22 April 1597; Ghent, County of Flanders, Spanish Netherlands
- Died: 1657 (aged 59–60); Zara, Dalmatia, Republic of Venice
- Military career
- Allegiance: House of Habsburg; Republic of Venice
- Service years: 1623–1650
- Rank: General
- Conflicts: Palatinate campaign War of the Mantuan Succession; Thirty Years War; Cretan War (1645–69)

Gil or Gilles De Haes (1597–1657), sometimes known as Guldehasius, was a Flemish soldier of the Eighty Years War, the Thirty Years War and the Cretan War (1645–69), who rose through the ranks to be a general.

== Life ==
De Haes was born in Ghent on 22 April 1597 and in early life worked as a baker's boy in the city. At the age of 26 he joined the Army of Flanders, serving in the Palatinate campaign and the War of the Mantuan Succession.

By 1632 he was in Austrian service in Bohemia, commanding an infantry regiment. De Haes fought in the Battle of Lutzen (1632), the Siege of Ingolstadt, and the Battle of Nördlingen (1634). In 1635 he was appointed general of the Army of Tyrol, occupying the Valtelline in 1637. He was injured in the Battle of Ziegenhain (1640), and spent six months recovering.

In the run-up to the Cretan War (1645–69) De Haes entered Venetian service. He campaigned successfully on the island of Zante in 1646–1647. In 1649 he was appointed governor of Dalmatia. His final victory was at Sebenico in 1650. He retired to Zara, where he died in 1657.

== Reading ==
- Charles Rahlenbeck, Gilles De Haes (Ghent, 1857). Available on Google Books.
