= Sidronius Hosschius =

Flemish poet and priest

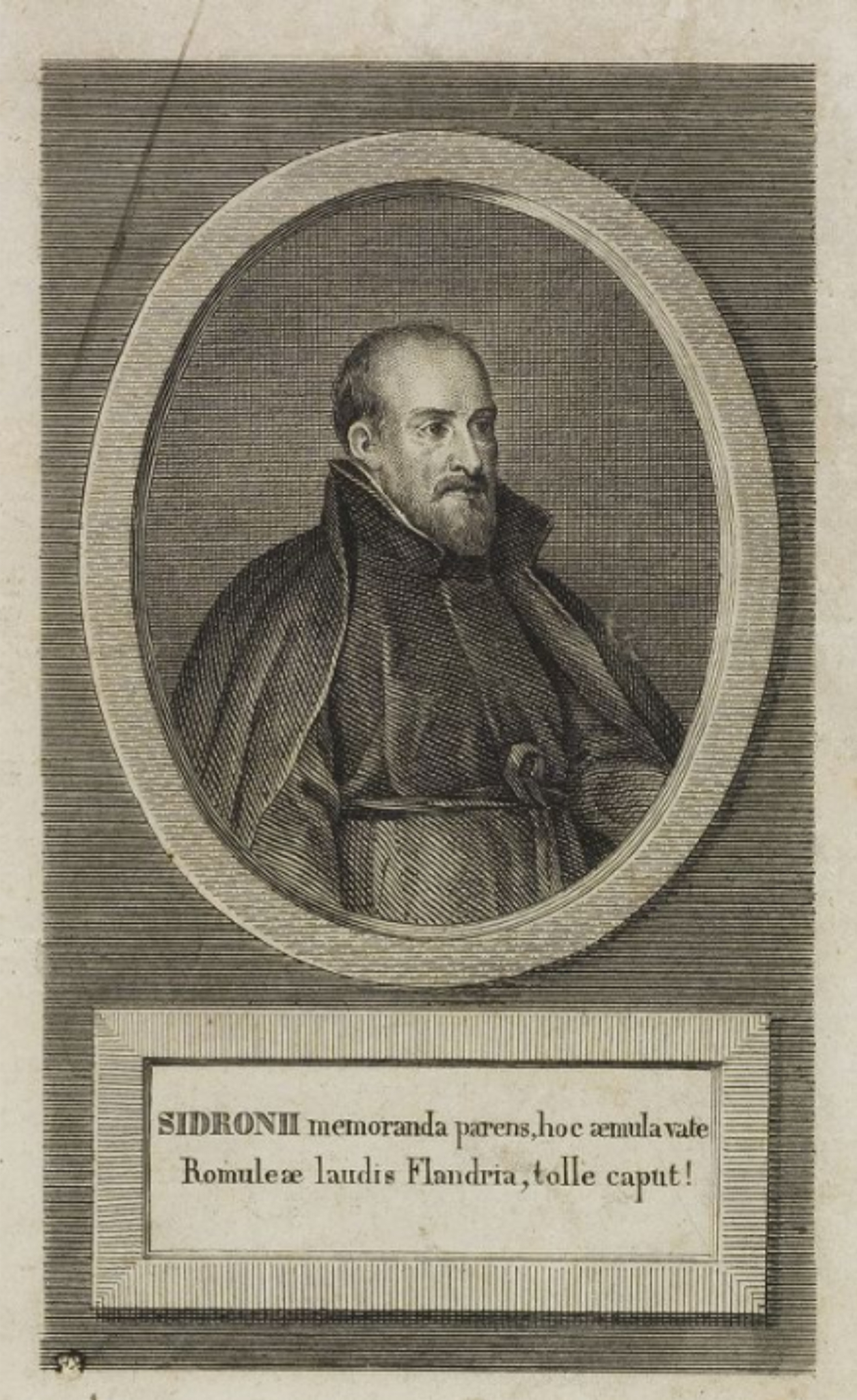
Portrait of Sidronius Hosschius

Sidronius Hosschius, the Latinised form of Syderoen de Ho(o)sch, also known as Sidronius de Hossche and Sidron de Hossche (20 January 1596 in Merkem – 4 September 1653 in Tongeren) was a Flemish poet and Jesuit priest. His contemporaries held him in great esteem for his elegant Latin verse and his works were reprinted several times during the 17th and 18th centuries.

== Life ==
De Hosche was born in Merke on 20 January 1596 as the son of Syderoen de Hosche and Jossyne Caeyaert. His father was a shepherd. After his studies in humanities at the Jesuit College in Ypres he continued his studies in philosophy in Douai.

He then entered the Order of the Jesuits in Mechelen in 1616 at the age of twenty. The later sanctified John Berchmans is one of his fellow novices. In 1620, he moved to the college of 's-Hertogenbosch where he was a teacher of Latin and poetry to the fourth-grade pupils. In 1623, he commenced his study of theology at the Old University of Leuven. After completing his studies, he was appointed a study prefect in 's-Hertogenbosch in 1628. Because of the fall of 's Hertogenbosch to Protestant forces in 1629, the Jesuit college was dissolved, and he was forced to leave. He stayed in Antwerp from 1632 to 1634. Here he taught the humanities and classics at the Jesuit College. To thank Willem de Wael, the principal of the college, he wrote a 90-line elegy, which was the start of his literary career.

With access to the Plantin Press in Antwerp, he was able to quickly gain international fame. In 1647 he is appointed steward by Archduke Leopold Wilhelm of Austria, governor of the Southern Netherlands. In this capacity he teaches the pages, and possibly also some of the children, of the Archduke. On 4 September 1653 he dies as superior of the Jesuit clergy in Tongeren.

== Works ==
He mainly composed elegies in which he glorifies nature, God, and ancient Rome. His works include De Christo Patiente, De Cursu vitæ humanæ, and De lacrymis S. Petri.
