= William Colson =

William Colson was a 16th-century English educator and a writer on arithmetic and French orthography who chose to pursue his career in the Low Countries due to the restrictions on Catholics in England.

== Life ==
Colson was born in London around the middle of the 16th century and obtained a Master of Arts degree. He left England in the early 1580s as a "voluntary exile for the Catholic cause" and spent time initially in the Prince-Bishopric of Liège, at Sint-Truiden, Liège and Huy, and later in the Spanish Netherlands, at Ciplet, Namur, Brussels, Antwerp, and possibly Lille. He obtained citizenship of the city of Liège in 1598 and three of six children were born in the city in 1599, 1601 and 1603. He made a living as a teacher of the liberal arts, particularly of mathematics, sometimes working in public schools but mostly with private adult students who wanted to improve their skills in arithmetic rapidly.

Around 1610 he returned to England, but at some point between 1613 and 1621 he again left for the Continent. On 18 August 1621 he received permission for himself and his family to settle in any location of the Prince-Bishopric they might choose. This is the last known document relating to him.

== Publications ==
- L'arithmetique par practique tant es nombres entiers que nombres rompus. Joincte la maniere de diviser sans division par addition et soubstraction seule (Liège, Léonard Streel, 1600)
- Livre, ou instruction de l'art de l'arithmetique es nombres entiers selon les cinq especes, auec une table y ioinct l'art ou l'ordre militaire, qui est la maniere de composer promptement les bataillons quarrés (Liège, Léonard Streel, 1603)
- A general tresury, a perpetual repertory, or a common councel-place of accounts for all countries in Christendome. The first part of ordinary accounts, in which is contained and found all usuall, daily, and most necessary reckonings ready done, and the assise of bread, with a just and easie proofe of their doings, by addition onely of two numbers together, and infinite examples of numeration, addition, substraction, multiplication, division, reduction, and of the rules of three, &c. (London, Nicholas Okes at the expences of the author, 1612)
- Table Manuell of the Pronounciation and Orthographie of the French tongue (London, W. Stansby, 1613)
- Un repertoire artificiel general et perpetuel des comptes, tous faicts Ou calculé sans besoing de les compter ou calculer, divisé en deux parties (Lille, Christophe Beys, 1613)
- The first part of the French grammar, artificially reduced into tables, by arte locall, called the arte of memorie. Contayning (after an extraordinary and most easie method) the pronounciation and orthographie of the French tongue according to the new manner of writing (London, William Stansby sold by John Parker, 1620)
