= Francis Coster =

Flemish Jesuit, theologian and author

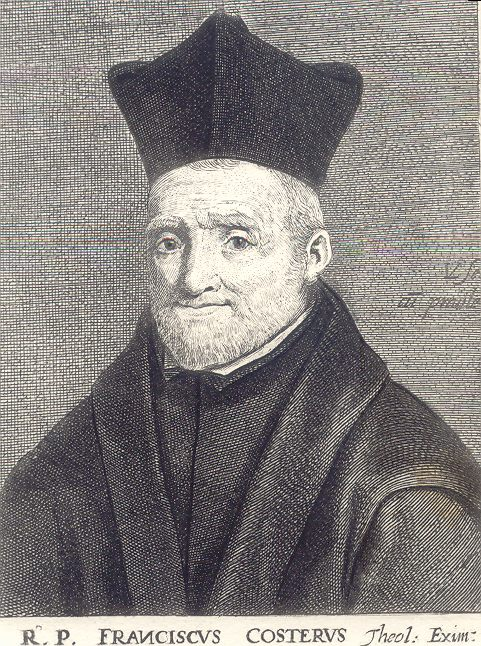
Francis Coster

Francis Coster (or Frans de Costere, Latin: Franciscus Costerus) (Mechelen, 16 June 1532 (1531) - Brussels, 16 December 1619) was a Flemish Jesuit, theologian and author.

== Life ==
Frans de Costere was received into the Society of Jesus by St. Ignatius on 7 November 1552. While still a young man he was sent to Cologne (western Germany) and lectured there on Sacred Scripture and astronomy. His reputation as a professor was established within a very short time, and on 10 December 1564, the university of Cologne conferred on him the degree of Doctor of Philosophy and Theology.

He was for two terms provincial of the Jesuit province of Belgium, for one term provincial of that of the Rhine, and assisted at three General Congregation of his order.

In 1575 he was recalled to Cologne to lead the College of the Three Crowns, after its previous rector was murdered. While there he established two local sodalities, the Sodality of the Blessed Sacrament and the Sodality of the Blessed Virgin.

== Works ==
The catalogue of his writings (De Backer, I, 218) mentions forty-two titles. They include works on ascetical subjects, meditations on the Blessed Virgin Mary, and sermons on the Gospel for each Sunday of the year.

Coster also wrote extensively in support of Catholicism and against Protestantism. Probably the most famous of his apologetical works was his Enchiridion controversiarum præcipuarum nostri temporis de Religione (Cologne, 1585, 1587, 1589, 1593). This was afterwards revised and enlarged by its author in 1596, 1605, 1608; and was translated into various languages.

A number of Protestant theologians replied, and Coster wrote works in response:

- Liber de Ecclesiâ contra Franciscum Gommarum (Cologne, 1604)
- Apologia adversus Lucæ Osiandri hæretici lutherani refutationum octo propositionum catholicarum (Cologne, 1606)
- Annotationes in N. T. et in præcipua loca, quæ rapi possent in controversiam (Antwerp, 1614), in response to Philip Marbach
