= 1609 in Belgium =

- Decades
- See also: Other events of 1609; List of years in Belgium

Events in the year 1609 in the Spanish Netherlands and Prince-bishopric of Liège (predecessor states of modern Belgium).

== Incumbents ==
=== Habsburg Netherlands ===
Sovereigns – Archdukes Albert and Isabella

=== Prince-Bishopric of Liège ===
Prince-Bishop – Ernest of Bavaria

== Events ==
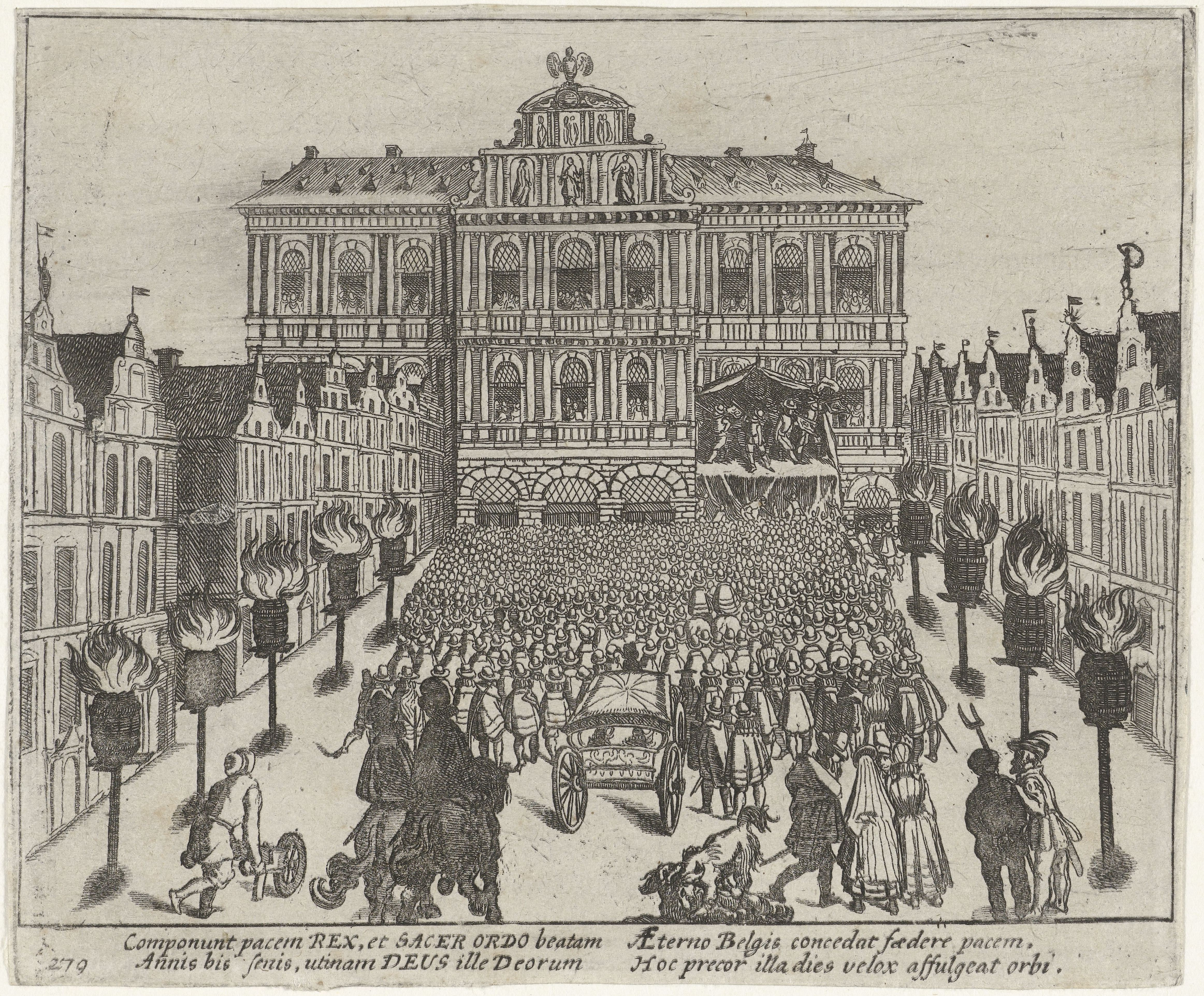
Proclamation of the Twelve Years' Truce in Antwerp, 1609

- 9 April – Twelve Years' Truce signed in Antwerp.
- 1 June – Archdukes issue proclamation against footpads, highwaymen and murderers.
- 10 June – War of the Jülich Succession begins.

1112710

- 27 October – City of Antwerp responds to vandalism of a religious image.

== Art and architecture ==
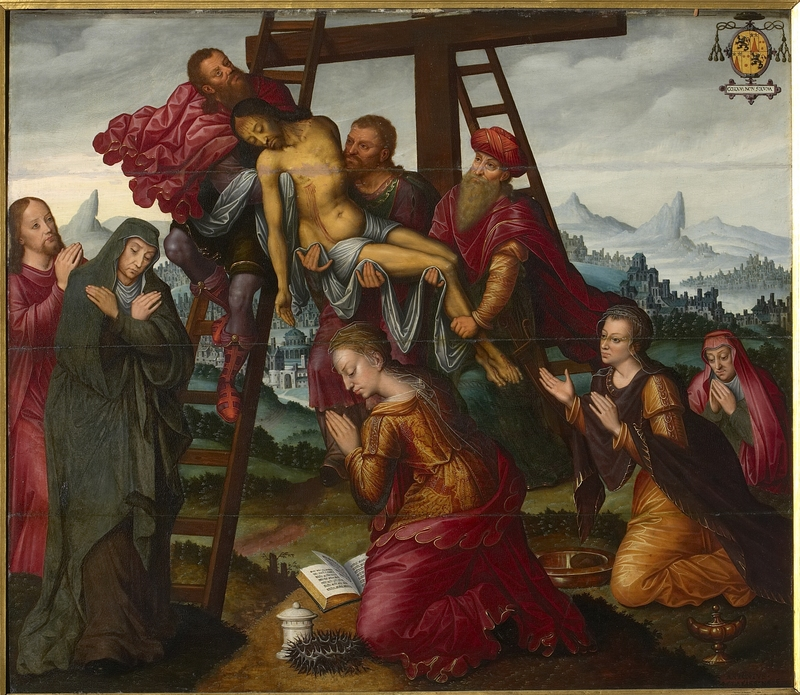
Antoon Claeissens, Descent from the Cross, 1609 (St. Salvator's Cathedral, Bruges)

Buildings

- 2 July – Albert and Isabella lay the foundation stone of the Basilica of Our Lady of Scherpenheuvel

Paintings

- Antoon Claeissens, Descent from the Cross

== Publications ==
- Joannes Balinus, De bello belgico (Brussels, Rutger Velpius)
- Laurentius Beyerlinck, Catholycke antwoorden op de daeghelijcxe vraegen der ghepretendeerde gereformeerde (Antwerp, Hieronymus Verdussen)
- François Buisseret, Histoire de la vie, miracles et translation de S. Marie d'Oingnies (Leuven, Gerardus Rivius)
- Benet Canfield, Reigle de perfection contenant un bref & lucide Abregé de toute la vie spirituelle reduitte à ce seul point de la volonté de Dieu (Arras, Guillaume de la Rivière)
- Joannes David, Vry-gheleyde tot ontlastinghe van conscientie om de catholiicke kercken, beelden, ende godtsdienst te gaen bekijcken (Antwerp, Joachim Trognaesius)
- Peter De Herpener, Een factie oft spel, openbaerlijc vanden Violieren binnen Antwerpen ghespeelt, tot verheuginge der ghemeynten, door de blijde tijdinge des bestandts (Antwerp, Gillis Coppens van Diest)
- Douay Bible: English College, Douai, The holie Bible faithfully translated into English, out of the authentical Latin. Diligently conferred with the Hebrew, Greeke, and other editions in divers languages. With arguments of the bookes, and chapters, annotations, tables, and other helpes (Douai, Laurence Kellam)
- Guillaume Gazet, L'histoire de la Saincte Chandelle miraculeusement donnee de Dieu et religieusement conservée en la ville d'Arras depuis l'an 1105 (Arras, Guillaume de la Rivière)
- Pompeo Giustiniano, Delle guerre di Fiandra (Antwerp, Joachim Trognaesius)
- Jean-Baptiste de Glen, La Messe des anciens chrestiens dicts de S. Thomas, en l'évesché d'Angamal ès Indes orientales (Brussels, Rutger Velpius)
- Joannes van Gouda, Andwoorde Joannis de Gouda op de medesprake aengaende de transsubstantiatie met Francisco ende Samuele Lansbergen (Antwerp, Joachim Trognaesius)
- Antonio de Gouvea, Histoire orientale, des grans progres de l'Eglise Cathol. Apost. et Rom. en la Reduction des anciens Chrestiens, dits de S. Thomas, de plususieurs autres Schismatiques et Heretiques a l'Union de la vraye Eglise-Conversion encor des Mahometains, Mores & Payens, translated by Jean-Baptiste de Glen (Brussels, Rutger Velpius)
- Jerónim Gracián de la Madre de Dios, Josephina: Summario de las excelencias del glorioso S. Joseph, esposo de la virgen Maria (Brussels, Jan Mommaert)
- Jerónim Gracián de la Madre de Dios, Lampara encendida compendio de la perfeccion (Brussels, Rutger Velpius)
- Jerónim Gracián de la Madre de Dios, Mystica theologia collegida de lo que escrivio S. Buenaventura del verdadero camino del cielo, con un itinerario de la perfecion, que es declaracion, y recopilacion de las tres vias, purgativa, illuminativa, y unitina (Brussels, Rutger Velpius)
- Jerónim Gracián de la Madre de Dios, Tratado de la redempcion de captivos (Brussels, Jan Mommaert)
- Jerónim Gracián de la Madre de Dios, Zelo de la propagacion de la fee en la que se contiene una exortacion para yr a predicar la fee catholica a las tierras de idolatras, infieles, y hereges (Brussels, Jan Mommaert)
- Joachim Hopper, Harmonia Davidica. seu Paraphrasis, argumenta, et explanationes in omnes psalmos davidicos (Douai, Balthazar Bellère)
- Jean de La Haye, Triumphus veritatis ordinati evangelii quadriga, sanctorum patrum exercitu stipatae (Douai, Balthazar Bellerus)
- Nicolas de La Vallée, Quaestio theologica. utrum aliqua divinatio sit licita? (Douai, widow of Charles Boscard)
- Mathias Lambrecht, Historia ecclesiastica. Oft Kerckelicke historie, revised and expanded by Aubertus Miraeus (Antwerp, Hieronymus Verdussen)
- Humphrey Leech, Dutifull and respective considerations upon foure severall heads of proofe and triall in matters of religion. Proposed by the high and mighty prince, James King of Great Britayne, France, and Ireland &c. in his late booke of premonition to all Christian princes, for clearing his royall person from the imputation of heresy ([Saint-Omer, English College Press])
- Humphrey Leech, A triumph of truth. Or Declaration of the doctrine concerning evangelicall counsayles ([Douai, Laurence Kellam])
- Leonardus Lessius, De justitia et jure caeterisque virtutibus cardinalibus libri quatuor (Antwerp, Plantin Press)
- Lodewijk Makeblijde, Catechismus dat is de christeliicke leeringhe ghedeylt in neghen-en-viertich lessen (Brussels, Jan Mommaert)
- Lodewijk Makeblijde, Den lust-hof der gheestelicke oeffeninghen (Antwerp, Hieronymus Verdussen)
- Lodewijk Makeblijde, Maniere om een generale biechte te doen (Antwerp, Hieronymus Verdussen)
- Aubertus Miraeus, Bibliothecae Antverpianae primordia (Antwerp, David Mertens)
- Aubertus Miraeus, Elogia Belgica sive illustrium Belgii scriptorum (Antwerp, David Mertens)
- Aubertus Miraeus, Origine des chevaliers et ordres militaires (Antwerp, David Mertens)
- Aubertus Miraeus, Origines equestrium sive militarium ordinum (Antwerp, David Mertens)
- Aubertus Miraeus, Vita justi Lipsi sapientiae et litterarum antistitis (Antwerp, David Mertens)
- Abraham Ortelius, L'epitome du theatre de l'univers, revised by Michel Coignet (Antwerp, Joannes Baptista Vrient)
- Robert Persons, A quiet and sober reckoning with M. Thomas Morton somewhat set in choler by his adversary P.R. concerning certaine imputations of wilfull falsities obiected to the said T.M. in a treatise of P.R. intituled Of mitigation ([Saint-Omer, English College Press])
- Raymond of Capua, The life of the blessed virgin, Sainct Catharine of Siena, translated by John Fenn ([Douai, Charles Boscard])
- Thimothée René, sieur de Lespine, La parure des dames (Brussels, Jan Mommaert)
- Thomas Sailly, Thesaurus precum et exercitiorum spiritualium, in usum presertim sodalitatis Partheniae (Antwerp, Plantin Press)
- Guillaume de Saluste du Bartas, De eerste weke der scheppinge der werelt, translated by Theoderick van Liefvelt (Brussels, Rutger Velpius)
- Carolus Scribani, Orthodoxae fidei controversa (Antwerp, Plantin Press)
- Henricus Sedulius, Diva Virgo Mosae-Traiectensis (Antwerp, Plantin Press)
- Petrus Simons, De veritate libri sex: et reliqua opera (Antwerp, Plantin Press)
- Richard Smith, The prudentiall ballance of religion, wherin the Catholike and protestant religion are weighed together with the weights of prudence, and right reason ([Saint-Omer, François Bellet])
- Andres de Soto, Declaracion y parafrase de las lamentaciones de Jeremias en lengua castellana (Brussels, Jan Mommaert)
- Richard Stanyhurst, Hebdomada Mariana, ex Orthodoxis Catholice Romane Ecclesiae Patribus collecta (Antwerp, Plantin Press)
- Teresa of Avila, Het leven van de moeder Teresa van Jesus. Fondatersse van d'orden der ongheschoeyde carmeliten, translated by R.V.O. (Brussels, Rutger Velpius)
- Nicolas Trigault, Copye des briefs gheschreven vanden E.P. Nicolaes Trigault aenden E.P. Franciscum Fleron. Wt Goa in Oost-Indien op Kersmis-avont, 1607 (Antwerp, Daniel Vervliet)
- Alonso de Villegas, Flos sanctorum: The lives of saints ([Douai], [Pierre Auroy])
- Cornelius Columbanus Vrancx, D'alder costelickste Testament van onsen zalichmaker ghebenedijt (Ghent, Gauthier Manilius)
- Jodocus de Weerdt, Concordiae Belgicae panegyricus parnassicus (Antwerp, Plantin Press)
- Edward Weston, Antiatheus, Antipoliticus, & Antisectarius: Tribus institutionum libris, triplex hominis officium, naturaliter, moraliter, ac theologice complectens (Douai, Balthazar Bellerus)
- Edward Weston, De vere Christiani hominis officiis libri tres (Antwerp, Jan van Keerberghen)

Music

- Luca Marenzio, Il primo, secondo, terzo, quarto & quinto libro de madrigali a cinque voci (Antwerp, Petrus Phalesius the Younger)
- Petrus Phalesius the Younger, Florilegium sacrarum cantionum quinque vocum (Antwerp, Petrus Phalesius the Younger, 1609)
- Bernard van Bauhuysen, Het prieel der gheestelijcke melodie (Bruges, Petrus Soetaert)

News pamphlets

- Articles de la trefve conclue et arrestee pour douze ans (Brussels, Rutger Velpius)
- Artijckelen van het bestant ghesloten voor XII. jaren (Antwerp, Joachim Trognaesius)
- Blyde tydinghe van het ghemaeckte bestand (Antwerp, Abraham Verhoeven)
- Conterfeytsel van d'Ambassadeurs ende waren present alsmen publiceerden den Trefves voor 12 Jaren t'Antwerpen (Antwerp, Abraham Verhoeven)
- Copye vande procuratien ghegheven by de Majesteyt des Conings van Spagnien (Antwerp, Joachim Trognaesius, 1609)
- Een cort verhael ende afbeeldinge vande heerlicke triumphe ende vieringe die tot Antwerpen geschiet is over het af-lesen vanden treve (anonymously printed)
- Cort verhael van't bestant, tusschen zijne majesteyt, ende hunne doorluchtichste hoocheden ter eere, ende de Staten generael vande Vereenichde Nederlanden ter ander sijden (Antwerp, Anthoni de Ballo)
- Cort verhael van t'bestant, tusschen Zijne Majesteyt, ende Hunne Doorluchtichste Hoocheden ter eenre, ende de Staten Generael vande vereenichde Nederlanden ter ander zijden (Brussels, Jan Mommaert)
- Cort verhael van t'ghene is ghepresenteert gheweest in den ommeganck die men tot Antwerpen ghehouden heeft 14 juni 1609 (Antwerp, Abraham Verhoeven)
- Niewe ende waerachtighe historie van ses glorieuse martelaers die in Japonien voor het Catholijck gheloove ghedoot zijn in 't jaer 1604 (Antwerp, Hieronymus Verdussen)
- Panegyricus Austriae serenissimis archiducibus Belgicae principibus patriae parentibus scriptus (Antwerp, Plantin Press)
- Publication de treves entre sa majesté & leurs altezes serenissimes de l'un & les estats generaus des prouinces unies de pays-bas de l'autre costé (Antwerp, Abraham Verhoeven)
- Replycke int lange gededuceert ende in rechte gefondeert op de copie van d'instrument van provocatie ende van presentatie, met andere stucken gheexhibeert by de heeren Ernest marcgrave van Brandenborch (Liège, Léonard Streel)
- Een testament van een Jongman van Antwerpen, welcke te Diest tot zijn onschult onthooft is, om een Jonghe Dochters wille (anonymously printed)
- Vercondinge van het bestant, tusschen syne majesteyt, ende hunne doorluchtichste hoocheden ter eenre, ende de Staten Generael vande vereenichde Nederlanden ter ander syden (Antwerp, Abraham Verhoeven)

== Births ==
- 16 May – Don Ferdinand of Austria (died 1641)
- 28 June – Pieter van Lint, artist (died 1690)
- 20 or 30 August – Artus Quellinus the Elder, sculptor (died 1668)

date uncertain

- Jan Baptist van Heil, painter (died c. 1695)
- Charles Wautier, painter (died 1703)

== Deaths ==
- 9 January – Joannes Bochius (born 1555), poet
- 4 April – Carolus Clusius (born 1526), horticulturalist
- 25 April – Guillaume de Berghes (born 1551), archbishop of Cambrai
- 3 September – Jean Richardot (born 1540), statesman
- 14 September – Pieter Damant (born 1530), bishop of Ghent
- 27 September – Hendrik van Cuyk (born 1546), bishop of Roermond

date uncertain

- Jacobus Marchantius (born 1537), historian
