= Lodewijk Makeblijde =

Flemish Jesuit and poet

Ludovicus Makeblyde S.J.
- Lodewijk Makeblijde
- Born: 24 March 1565; Poperinge, County of Flanders
- Died: 17 August 1630 (aged 65); Voorschoten, Holland
- Education: Jesuit College, Saint-Omer
- Alma mater: Anchin College, Douai
- Occupation: clergyman
- Writing career
- Language: Dutch
- Period: Baroque
- Genre: verse

Lodewijk Makeblijde (1565–1630) was a Flemish Jesuit and a Renaissance poet and hymn writer.

== Life ==
Makeblijde was born to a patrician family in Poperinge, County of Flanders, on 24 March 1565. His father, Lodewijk senior, was to be mayor of the town from 1571 to 1600.

=== Education ===
Lodewijk junior studied at the Jesuit college in St Omer (1579–1584), going on to study philosophy at the Jesuit house of studies ("Anchin College") in Douai (1584–1586), without matriculating at the university. In 1586 he applied to Francis Coster to be admitted to the Society of Jesus, and he started the novitiate at Tournai on 4 October 1586.

During his novitiate, under novice master Jan van den Berg (Latinized "Bargius"), Makeblijde would have been expected to go through the Spiritual Exercises of Ignatius of Loyola thoroughly, to meditate for one hour each day, and to experience practical work in the hospitals, infirmaries, catechism classes and kitchens attached to Jesuit houses. In 1587 Makeblijde suffered a hernia that was not cured until 1593.

On 5 October 1588 he made his vows as a member of the order, and in 1589 he began teaching at the Jesuit college in Bruges, being transferred to Ypres the following year. He taught at Ypres from 1590 to 1595, receiving the lower orders from Petrus Simons, bishop of Ypres, in 1593. In 1595 he was sent to the Jesuit house of studies in Leuven to study theology, again without matriculating at the university. He was taught dogmatic theology by Leonard Lessius and exegesis by Martin Del Rio and Cornelius a Lapide. Fellow students in Leuven were Heribert Rosweyde and Joannes van Gouda. His ordinations as subdeacon (May 1597), deacon (September 1597) and priest (December 1597) were by Mathias Hovius, Archbishop of Mechelen.

=== Teacher and catechist ===
In 1597 his first work was published in Leuven by Jan Maes: Cort onderwijs van acht oeffeninghen (Short instruction of eight exercises), a collection of prayers and teachings for the young. He preached in Poperinge at Christmas 1599 and again in 1609, and dedicated his Berch (1618) to the magistrates of the town.

In 1600 he was sent to Bergues (now in France) as rector of the new Jesuit school that was being established there with the help of the town council, the local Benedictine abbot and the bishop of Ypres. The college formally opened in 1601, with a Jesuit community of six priests, two scholastics and four brothers. During his time as rector at Bergues, Makeblijde regularly travelled to Dunkirk on Sundays to preach.

In 1604 Makeblijde became rector of the Jesuit college in Ypres. He took his final vows in Lille on 22 September 1605. From 1605 to 1607 he was attached to the Jesuit house in Antwerp, where Carolus Scribani was rector, and the theology professors were his Leuven classmates Heribertus Rosweyde and Jan van Gouda. In Antwerp Makeblijde was not involved with the school, but with preaching. He had a reputation for being able to explain things clearly to children, and was involved in the production of the Mechelen Catechism (published in Antwerp by Joachim Trognaesius in 1609).

=== Missionary ===
From 1611 to 1630 he worked on the Holland Mission, based in Delft where there was a clandestine church in the brewery De drie Haringhen. His catechism classes had to be stopped in 1617, and the schout (sheriff) of Delft raided his secret evening sermons five times that year, but without capturing Makeblijde. In June 1619 he was arrested, but was ransomed for 600 guilders.

In 1621 the head of the Jesuit mission in Holland, Marcus van den Tempel, was captured by the magistrates of Leiden and expelled from the Republic. Makeblijde replaced him as head of the Mission just as the work was made harder by new laws against Jesuit missioners. The States General of the United Provinces passed a law on 26 February 1622, proclaimed in Delft on 13 March, giving Jesuits six days to leave the Republic. Makeblijde went into hiding. The worst period of persecution, by schout Jan Vockestaert, ran from 1621 to 1629. Makeblijde himself was replaced as head of the Mission in 1629, due to ill health caused by gall stones. He died at Voorschoten in Holland on 17 August 1630.

== Commemoration ==
From 1955 to 2008 there was a secondary school in Rijswijk named the Lodewijk Makeblijde College (since amalgamated to St Stanislas College, Delft).

== Works ==
- Cort onderwijs van acht oeffeninghen (Leuven, Jan Maes, 1597)
- Den Schat der Christelicker leeringhe (Antwerp, Joachim Trognaesius, 1610). Second edition (1620) Available on Google Books
- Nieuwe ende waerachtighe historie van ses glorieuse martelaers die in Japonien voor het Catholijck gheloove ghedoot zijn, translated from the French edition (Antwerp, Hieronymus Verdussen, 1609)
- Den Schat der ghebeden (1611)
- Konste om sekerlick de volmaecktheyt der Deughden te verkrijghen (Antwerp, Joachim Trognaesius, 1611)
- Den Lusthof der gheestelicke oeffeninghen (Antwerp, Hieronymus Verdussen, 1613)
- Den berch der geesterlycker vreuchden (Antwerp, Hieronymus Verdussen, 1618)
- Troost der Siecken, ende der Overleden (Antwerp, Hieronymus Verdussen, 1621)
- Den hemelschen handel der devote zielen, vol gheestelijcke meditatien, ghetijden, lof-sanghen, ende ghebeden (Antwerp, Joannes Cnobbaert, 1625) Available on Google Books
