= Gijsbert van Veen =

Dutch painter, draughtsman and engraver

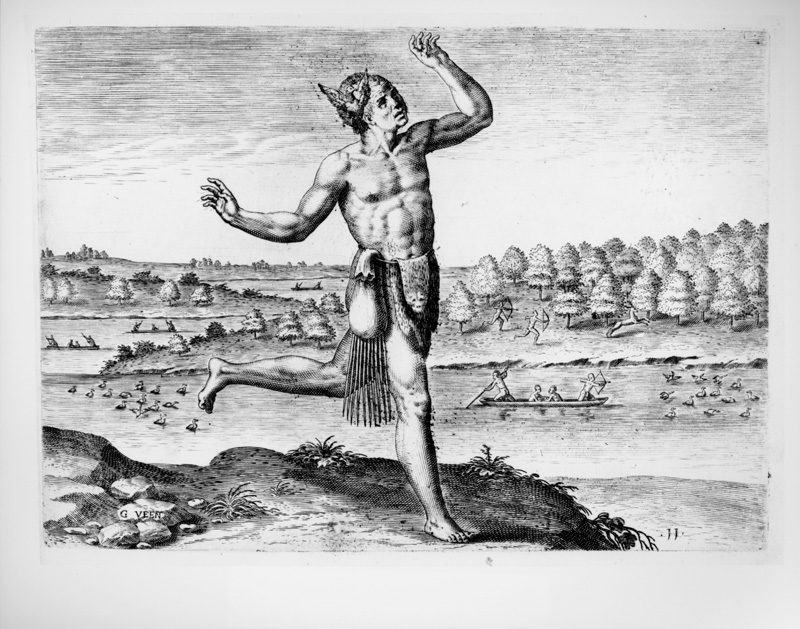
The Conjurer

Gijsbert, Gijsbrecht or Gysbrecht van Veen (Leiden, c. 1562 – Antwerp, 1628) was a Dutch painter, draughtsman and engraver. He is known for his portrait paintings and reproductive engravings.

== Life ==
Gijsbert van Veen was born in Leiden, County of Holland around 1562 as the son of Cornelis Jansz. van Veen (1519–1591) and Geertruyd Simons van Neck (born 1530). He was the brother of Otto, Pieter and Elisabeth van Veen. His brother Otto became a prominent painter in Flanders while Pieter became a prominent lawyer in The Hague and was an amateur painter. The van Veen family was an aristocratic family and father Cornelis Jansz. held the position of mayor of Leiden a few times. The Catholic family which remained loyal to the Spanish king moved to Antwerp in 1572 after the start of the Dutch Revolt, and then to Liège.

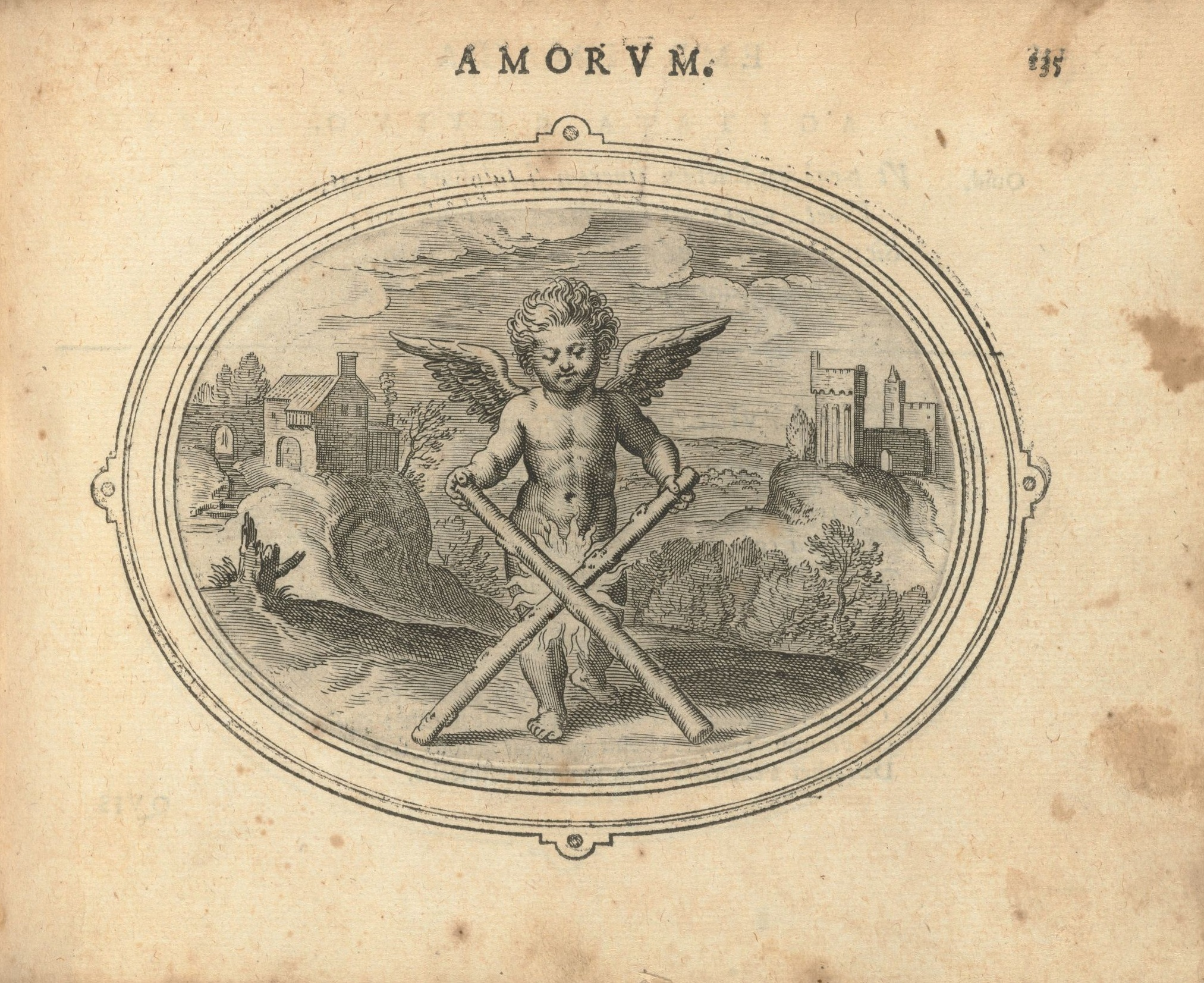
Amorum from 'Amorum emblemata'

Otto van Veen traveled to Rome around 1574 or 1575 where he stayed for about five years. It is not clear whether Gijsbert travelled with his brother Otto or later joined him in Italy. It is known that he produced engravings in Rome (in 1588) and Venice (in 1589). His engravings in Rome were published by Bernardino Passari and Johannes Statius.

Upon his return to Flanders, van Veen moved to Brussels where his brother had become a painter to the court of Archdukes Albert and Isabella. He also became linked to the Brussels court as an artist as well as a diplomat. In 1603, van Veen was paid 150 livres from state funds for carrying out secret missions for the Archdukes Albert and Isabella. In the same year he was awarded 373 livres 15 sols in part payment of 873 livres 15 sols due for portraits of Albert, Isabella, and the late Philip II of Spain, painted at the Archdukes' behest as a gift for Charles Philippe de Croÿ, Marquis d’Havré.

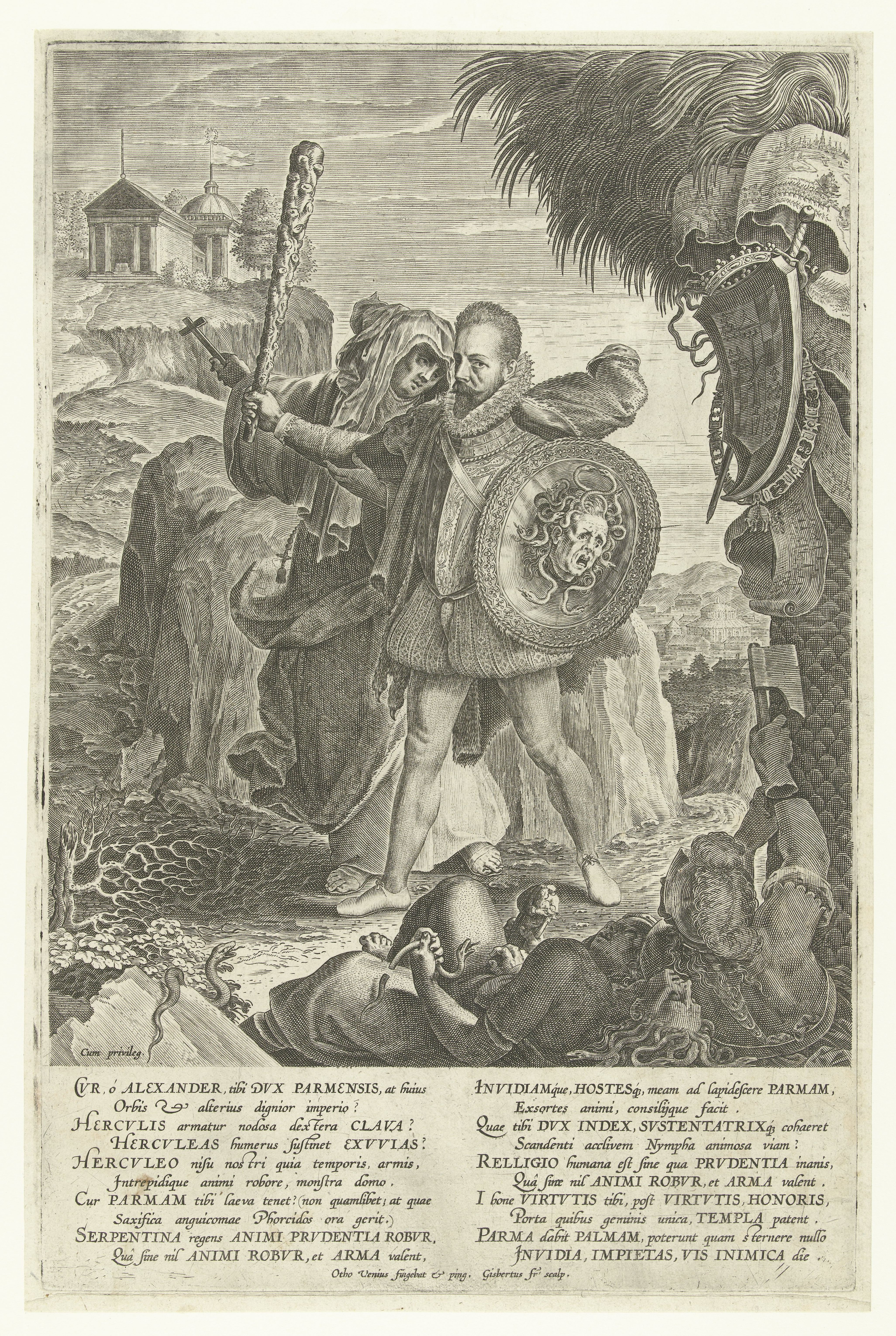
Allegory with the Duke of Parma as champion of the Catholic Church in the Netherlands

In 1604 he was paid another 803 livres and 10 sols for portraits of the king and queen of Spain, again gifts for the Marquis of Havré, and for portraits of Albert and Isabella that had been sent to the King of England the previous year.

From 1612 he lived in Antwerp where he died.

== Work ==
Van Veen painted portrait paintings and made reproductive engravings after works by other artists such as his brother Otto. None of his portrait paintings are known to have been preserved.

He made illustrations for a series of four books which Theodor de Bry published in four languages (English, German, French and Latin) in Frankfurt in 1590. The books were illustrated versions of Thomas Harriot's A Briefe and True Report of the New Found Land of Virginia about the first English settlements in America and the lives of the Algonquian-speaking Indians in the Outer Banks region of present-day North Carolina. The illustrations were based on the watercolor drawings of colonist John White. One of van Veen's engravings for this book series entitled The Conjurer depicts a native American medicine man performing a ritual on the board of a river.

Gijsbert van Veen is also credited with making the engravings after designs by his brother Otto for the Horatian emblem book entitled Quinti Horatii Flacci emblemata : imaginibus in aes incisis, notisque illustrata first published in Antwerp in 1607 by Hieronymus Verdussen. This book enjoyed enduring popularity thanks to the fact that it was a groundbreaking way to print emblems: Latin text on the verso and a detailed image of the emblem on the recto of every page opening. Later editions were polyglot with text in Dutch, French, Spanish, Italian and Latin. It was reprinted and pirated in numerous editions in the following 100 years. Gijsbert van Veen further made the engravings for two other emblem books of his brother Otto: Amorum emblemata, figuris Aeneis incisa (1608), and the Amoris divini emblemata (1615).
