= Pietro Andrea Canonieri =

Italian Baroque writer and political theorist

Pietro Andrea Canonieri (1582–1639) was an Italian writer of Baroque treatises on morality, politics and poetry.

== Life ==
Canonieri was born at Rossiglione (Genoa) in the second half of the 16th century, the son of a doctor. He studied medicine in Genoa and law in Parma, began his literary career in Florence, and then studied theology in Rome. He left Rome for Madrid, perhaps in order to enrol in the Spanish Army for a short period. By December 1611, he was living in the Low Countries, practicing medicine in Antwerp. He died there in 1639. He is the author of a large number of political tracts, the best known of which are Il perfetto cortegiano et dell'uffizio del prencipe verso il cortegiano and commentaries on Tacitus (both 1609), and Dell'introduzione alla politica, alla ragion di stato e alla pratica del buon governo (1614). Canonieri drew on the work of Tommaso Campanella.

== Works ==
- Epistolarum laconicarum libri quattuor (Florence, 1607)
- De curiosa doctrina (Florence, 1607)
- Le lodi e i biasimi del vino (Viterbo, 1608)
- Il perfetto Cortegiano et dell'Uffizio del Prencipe verso il Cortegiano (Rome, 1609)
- Quaestiones ac Discursus in duos primos libros C. Cornelii Taciti (Rome, 1609)
  - Reprinted as Dissertationes politicae ac Discursus varii in C. Taciti Annalium (Frankfurt, 1610)
- Delle Cause dell'infelicità e disgrazie de gli huomini letterati e guerrieri (Antwerp, 1612)
- Flores illustrium epitaphiorium ex praeclarissimarum totius Europae civitatum et praestantissimorum poetarum monumentis excerpti (Antwerp, Joachim Trognaesius, 1613)
- Dell'introduzione alla politica, alla ragion di stato et alla pratica del buon governo (Antwerp, 1614; reprinted 1627)
- Flores illustrium axiomatum, sententiarum ac similitudinum politicarum (Antwerp, 1615)
- In septem Aphorismorum Hippocratis libros, Medicae, Politicae, Morales ac Theologicae, interpretationes (Antwerp, 1617-1618).

== Sources ==
- Castronovo, Valerio (1975). "CANONIERI, Pietro Andrea". Dizionario Biografico degli Italiani (in Italian). Vol. 18: Canella–Cappello. Rome: Istituto dell'Enciclopedia Italiana. ISBN 978-88-12-00032-6.
- Bertoldi, Paola (2002). "Canonieri, Pietro Andrea". The Oxford Companion to Italian Literature. Oxford University Press. ISBN 978-0-19-818332-7.
