= Lelio Brancaccio =

Lelio Brancaccio Marquess of Montesilvano
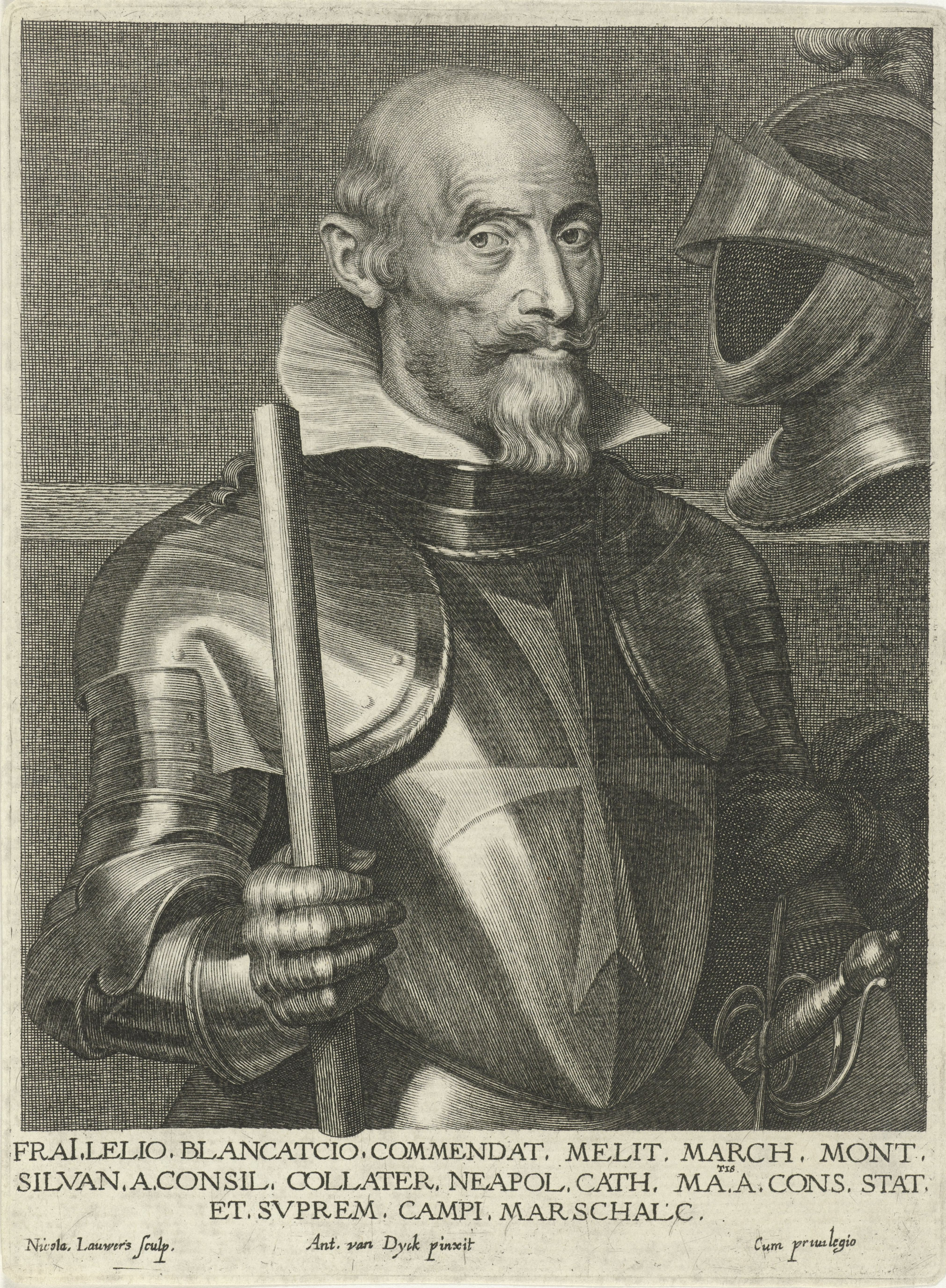
- Portrait of Lelio Brancaccio, engraved by Nicolaes Lauwers after Anthony van Dyck
- Born: around 1560; Naples
- Died: 1637; Perpignan
- Military career
- Allegiance: Habsburg
- Service years: 1589–1637
- Rank: Maestre de Campo general

Lelio Brancaccio (around 1560–1637), Marquess of Montesilvano, was a Neapolitan commander of Habsburg armies in Italy, the Low Countries and Catalonia.

== Life ==
Brancaccio was born in Naples around 1560. In 1584 he renounced his inheritance and joined the Order of Malta. In 1589 he entered Spanish Habsburg service as captain of an infantry company. Apart from a brief stint as sergeant major of a regiment of Italian infantry in the Long Turkish War, he served the Habsburgs for the rest of his life. In 1602 he joined the Army of Flanders, as Maestre de Campo of an infantry regiment he had raised. Taking ship from Flanders for Spain to convoy Spanish infantry, he was captured en route by an English naval squadron. He was released and returned to Naples in 1603. By 1604 he was back in Flanders, and was appointed to the Council of War in Brussels.

After the signing of the Twelve Years' Truce between the Habsburgs and the Dutch Republic, he returned to Naples and became a member of the Collateral Council. He wrote a military treatise, I Carichi militari, dedicated to Albert VII, Archduke of Austria, which was first printed in Antwerp by Joachim Trognaesius (1610), and went through further editions in Milan (1620) and Venice (1641). Brancaccio became an inspector of fortifications for the Viceroy of Naples, the Duke of Osuna.

With the recommencement of war in Flanders in 1621, Brancaccio returned there. In 1623, in recognition of his services to the Spanish monarchy, Philip IV of Spain created him Marquess of Montesilvano. In 1626 he became maestro di campo generale of the Genoese forces in their conflict with Savoy over the Marquisate of Zuccarello. From 1627 to 1630 he was in Spain as an adviser to the Council of War in Madrid. He returned to Italy in 1630 to command forces in the War of the Mantuan Succession, and when that war was settled by treaty in 1631 he travelled to Flanders for a fourth time. He commanded the garrison defending Maastricht during the siege of 1632. In that year or the following Philip IV named him a councillor of state. In 1633 he travelled via Lombardy to Barcelona. Given command of the army of Roussillon (then part of the Crown of Aragon), he died at Elna in November 1636.
