= Joannes van Gouda =

Joannes or Jan van Gouda (1571–1630) was a Dutch Jesuit educator and controversialist.

== Life ==
Van Gouda was born in Utrecht, on 29 January 1571, to Dirk van der Goude and Catharina van Moerendael. He entered the Jesuit novitiate in Tournai on 21 May 1588, going on to teach in Jesuit colleges in Tournai, Douai, and Antwerp. He became a noted preacher, sometimes being invited to preach at the court of Archduke Albert in Brussels. He was also an active apologist, publishing many controversial booklets in Dutch defending the Catholic teaching on the Real Presence, Transubstantiation, and the veneration of saints against Protestant, and particularly Calvinist attacks. On 17 June 1610, he took part in a public disputation on Transubstantiation with Franciscus Lansbergius, minister at Rotterdam. He died in Brussels on 28 December 1630.

== Writings ==
- Andwoorde op de medesprake aengaende de transsubstantiatie met Francisco ende Samuele Lansbergen, ministers tot Rotterdam (Antwerp, Joachim Trognaesius, 1609)
- Voor de acht katholiicke propositien P. Francisci Costeri teghens Henricum Brand Willemssen (Antwerp, Hieronymus Verdussen, 1611)
- Port voor den voor-bode Henrici Boxhornii woorden-dienaers in Breda (Antwerp, Hieronymus I Verdussen, 1611)
- Ander-half-hondert leughens Henrici Boxhornii in sijn venijnich Teghen-gift ghemenght, ontdeckt ende wederleyt (Antwerp, Hieronymus Verdussen, 1611)
- De victorieuse transsubstantiatie (Antwerp, Hieronymus Verdussen, 1611)
- Den katholiicken heyligen-dienst (Antwerp, Hieronymus Verdussen, 1612)
- De godtloosheyt der Rotterdamscher inquisitie (Antwerp, Hieronymus Verdussen, 1612)
- Bewiis Joannis de Gouda dat Henricus Daniel Boxhorn is 1. eenen qualijck ghereformeerden, 2. eenen onverstandighen dialecticus, 3. eenen vervalscher ende beliegher der schrifturen (Antwerp, Hieronymus Verdussen, 1614)
- Sommighe catholycke redenen Joannis de Govda teghens de ghereformeerde valscheyden Michaelis Hogii. Woorden-dienaers in Seven-berghen (Brussels, Hubert Anthoon, 1615)
