= Gertruida van Veen =

Flemish painter (1602–1643)

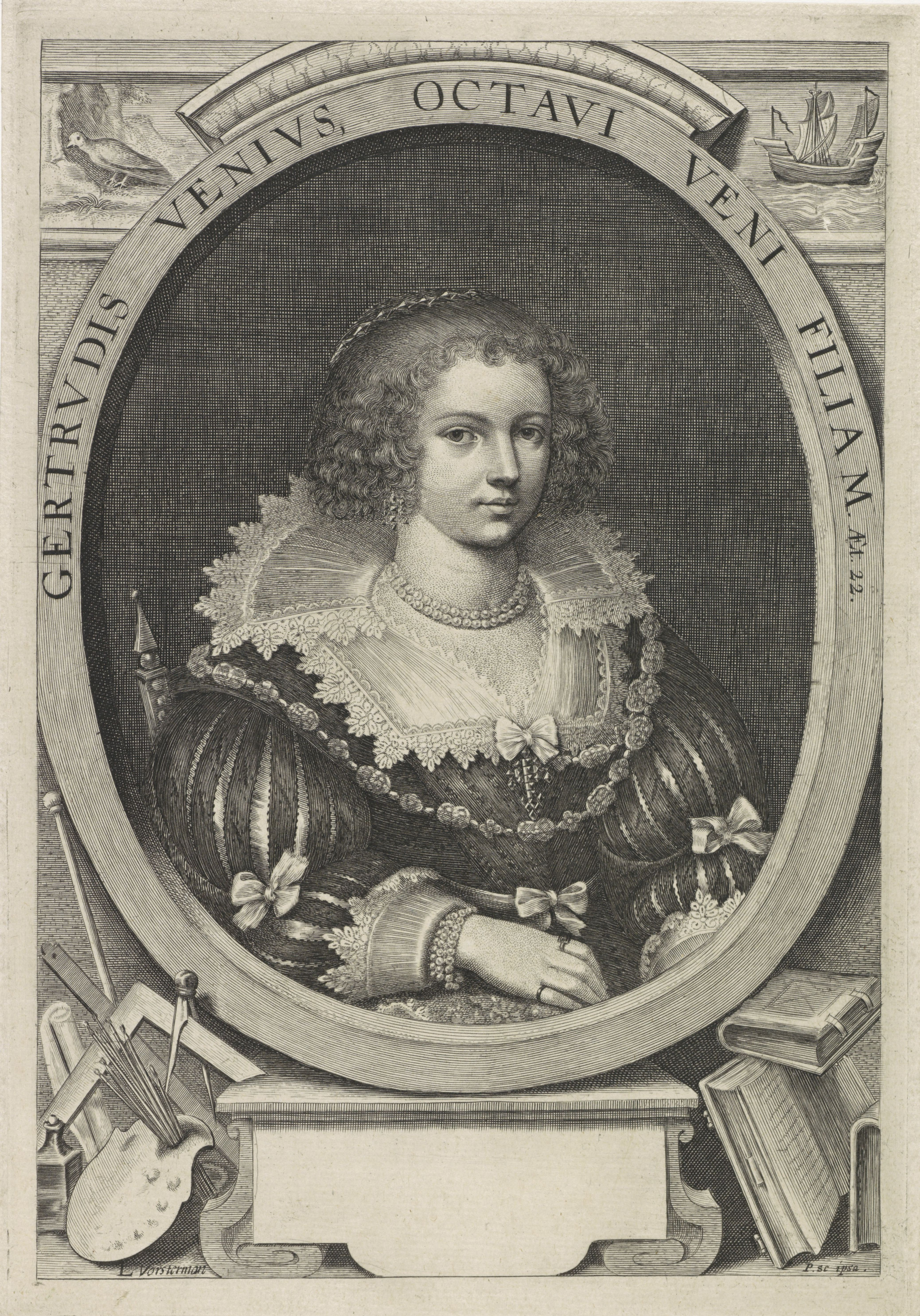
- Born: 4 June 1602; Antwerp
- Died: 30 June 1643 (aged 41); Antwerp

Gertruida van Veen (June 4, 1602 – June 30, 1643) was a painter from the Southern Netherlands.

She was born in Antwerp as the daughter of the painter Otto van Veen. She is best known for her portrait of her father, which is held in the Brussels Museum. Her own portrait was engraved by Lucas Vorsterman. She married Ludovicus Malo and is buried in the St. James' Church, Antwerp.

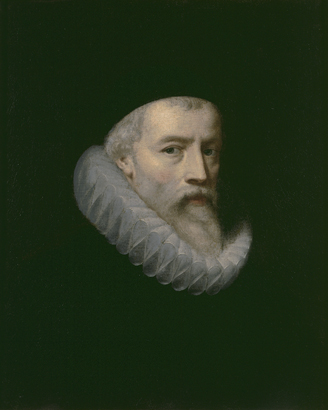
Portrait of the artist's father, circa 1617–1629
