= Johannes Cotovicus =

17th-century travel writer

- Jan van Cootwijk
- Died: 1629
- Writing career
- Language: Latin
- Genres: travel writer
- Subjects: the Levant
- Notable work: Itinerarium Hierosolymitanum et Syriacum (1619)

Johannes Cotovicus or Jan van Cootwijk was a 17th-century travel writer who wrote an account of a journey to Jerusalem and Syria. Cootwijk was a native of Utrecht and a Doctor of Laws. He travelled through much of western Europe before embarking on a pilgrimage to Jerusalem which he described in Itinerarium Hierosolymitanum et Syriacum (Antwerp, Hieronymus Verdussen, 1619). This was translated into Dutch by Adriaan van Meerbeeck under the title De loflycke reyse van Jerusalem ende Syrien (Antwerp, 1620).

The Itinerarium included an abridgement of Gasparo Contarini's De magistratibus et republica Venetorum (1543) which was later published separately as Synopsin respublicae Venetae (1626).
