= Cornelis Manilius =

Printer and bookseller in Ghent (active 1548–1558)

- Died: Ghent, County of Flanders (now Belgium)
- Occupations: Printer, bookseller, poet
- Years active: 1548–1558
- Known for: Founder of a Ghent printing business continued by his sons
- Notable work: Verse account of Prince Philip’s entry into Ghent (1549) allegorical drama *De Doodt*
- Spouse: Collyne van Eestenrycke
- Children: Ghileyn Manilius, Gauthier Manilius

Cornelis Manilius (active 1548–1558) was a printer and bookseller in the city of Ghent whose business was continued by his sons Ghileyn and Gauthier. He was also a poet.

Born in Bruges, Manilius established his business in Ghent in 1548. He married Collyne van Eestenrycke.

His poetic works include a verse account of Prince Philip's solemn entry into Ghent on 13 July 1549, and an allegorical drama on death.
