= Joachim Trognaesius =

Belgian printer and bookseller

- Joachim Trogney
- Born: between 1556 and 1559
- Died: 23 June 1624
- Occupation(s): printer and bookseller
- Years active: 1588–1624
- Era: handpress
- Spouse: Livine de Pickere
- Children: Alexander Trognaesius; Caesar Joachim Trognaesius
- Parent: Jan Trognaesius

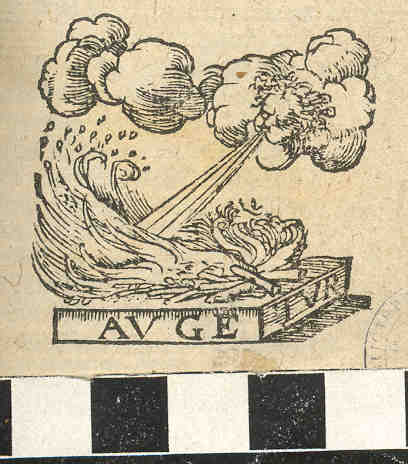
Printer's device of Joachim Trognaesius as used in Het paradiis der gheesteliicker vrevchden verciert met vytghelesen gheesteliicke liedekens (1617), Universiteit Gent - Boekentoren BL.006581

Joachim Trognaesius, sometimes Trognesius or Trogney (died 23 June 1624), was a printer and bookseller in late-16th-century and early-17th-century Antwerp.

== Life ==
Joachim Trognaesius is first mentioned as a bookseller in the accounts of the Plantin Office in 1586 and of the Chamber of Rhetoric the Violieren in 1588.

As a printer he produced works in Dutch, French, Italian, English and Latin, including history books, devotional works, classical texts and almanacs. There was a particular prevalence of Jesuit works among his output. He was also, together with his son Alexander, alleged to be a purveyor of illustrated editions of the pornographic sonnets of Pietro Aretino. He had commercial links with the geographer Abraham Ortelius.

He died on 23 June 1624. His business, on the churchyard of Antwerp Cathedral, was continued by his son, Caesar Joachim Trognaesius (born 1590), who was also a designer of calligraphic type.

== Publications ==
- 1587: William Allen, The copie of a letter concerning the yeelding up of Daventrie unto his catholike majestie, by sir William Stanley knight – a justification of Sir William Stanley's surrender of Deventer
- 1588: Jan Franco, Almanach oft journael voor't schrickel-jaer ons Heeren M.D.LXXXVIII – a calendar for the year 1588
- 1588: Statuta synodalia dioecesis Atrebatensis cum praedecessorum statutis adjectis (printed by Joachim Trognaesius for Claude de Buyens, Arras) – statutes of the diocesan synod of the diocese of Arras
- 1589: I. B., The copy of a letter lately written by a Spanishe gentleman, to his freind in England in refutation of sundry calumnies, there falsly bruited, and spred emonge the people. The authors being in England by reason of the late Armado – counter-propaganda regarding the Spanish Armada
- 1589: Cort verhael vanden aenslach die d'Engelsche hebben aenhevanghen in Spaengien ende Portugael – an account of the English Armada's activities on the coasts of Spain and Portugal
- 1593: William Rainolds, A treatise conteyning the true catholike and apostolike faith of the holy sacrifice and sacrament ordeyned by Christ at his last Supper Available on Google Books
- 1595: Luis de Molina, S.J., Liberi arbitrii cum gratiae donis, divina praescientia, providentia, praedestinatione, et reprobatione, concordia
- 1596: Orazio Torsellini, S.J., De vita Francisci Xaverii, qui primus e Societate Jesu in Indiam & Japoniam evangelium invexit, libri sex – a life of St Francis Xavier, S.J.
- 1597–1604: Francis Coster, S.J., Catholijcke sermoonen op de evangelien van de sondaghen – sermons on the Sunday Gospels, in three parts: Pentecost to Advent, Advent to Lent, Lent and Eastertide. 1606 reprint of part 1, 1601 printing of part 2, and 1604 printing of part 3 available on Google Books
- 1598: Pedro de Ribadeneyra, S.J., Vita Francisci Borgiae tertii societatis Jesu generalis – a life of Francis Borgia, S.J.
- 1600: Julius Fatius, S.J., Van 't versterven der menschelijcker affectien, translated from Italian to Dutch by Thomas Sailly, S.J. – a treatise on mortification. Available on Google Books
- 1603: Francisco Arias, Het goedt ghebruyck van de twee H. Sacramenten der Biechten ende des Autaers, translated by Nicolaus Burenus
- 1607: De Reghelen der societeyt Iesu – the Rule of the Society of Jesus. Available on Google Books
- 1609: Pompeo Giustiniano, Delle guerre di Fiandra libri VI, edited by Giuseppe Gamurini Available on Google Books
- 1610: Lelio Brancaccio, I Carichi Militari. Available on Google Books
- 1612: Pietro Andrea Canonieri, Delle Cause dell'infelicità e disgrazie de gli huomini letterati e guerrieri
- 1614: Pietro Andrea Canonieri, Dell'introduzione alla politica, alla ragion di stato et alla pratica del buon governo Available on Google Books
- 1617: Nicolas de Montmorency, Fonteyne der liefde, translated by Adriaan van Meerbeeck
- 1620: Francisco Ribera, S.J., Het leven der h. moeder Terese van Iesus, fundaterse vande barvoetsche Carmeliten ende Carmeliterssen (2 vols.) – a Dutch translation of a Spanish life of Teresa of Avila. Volume 1 and volume 2 available on Google Books.
