= Gauthier Manilius =

Flemish printer and bookseller

- Born: unknown
- Died: late 1626
- Occupations: printer and bookseller
- Years active: 1574–1626
- Era: handpress
- Notable work: Nicasius Van der Schuere, Een cleyne of corte institutie dat is onderwysinghe der christelijcker religie (1581) – Dutch abridgement of Calvin's Institutes
- Spouse: Jossine De Vos
- Children: Servais Manilius
- Parent(s): Cornelis Manilius and Collyne van Eestenrycke
- Relatives: Ghileyn Manilius (brother)

Gauthier Manilius (died late 1626) was active as a printer and bookseller in Ghent from 1574 until his death. His career was marked by the course of the Dutch Revolt.

== Life ==
Gauthier took over the family printing business, founded by his father, on his brother Ghileyn's death in 1574. Over the course of his fifty-two-year career he printed over 300 titles. Under the Calvinist regime (1578–1584) he printed Calvinist books, most importantly a Dutch abridgement of Calvin's Institutes of the Christian Religion. From 1585 he printed Catholic books. Much of his work, however, was legal printing for the City of Ghent and the Council of Flanders, and other secular material. He died in late 1626. His widow ran the business from 1626 to 1631, when their son, Servais Manilius, came into his inheritance.

== Publications ==
- 1578: Enchiridion, oft Handtboecxken van de Christelijcke Leere ende Religion. Available on Google Books
- 1581: Nicasius Van der Schuere, Een cleyne of corte institutie dat is onderwysinghe der christelijcker religie ghestelt in locos communes – a Dutch abridgement of Calvin's Institutes. Available on Google Books
- 1584: Articles et conditions ... accordez a la Ville de Gand – terms of the surrender of Ghent to Alexander Farnese, Duke of Parma, 17 September 1584. Available on Google Books
- 1585: Artijclen ende conditien by mijn heere de prince van Parme, Plaisance, etc. Gouverneur ende Stadthouder generael vande Landen van herwaertsovere, wten name vander Conijncklicke Majesteyt van Hispanien, Grave van Vlaendren, etc. gheaccodeert der stadt van ghendt ende Inghesetenen van diere, den xvijsten Septembris M.D.LXXXIIII. Available on Google Books
- 1585: Articulen ende Conditien vanden Tractate aenghegaen ende ghesloten, tusschen die Hoocheyt vanden Prince van Parma, Plaisance, etc. Stadthouder, Gouverneur ende Capiteyne generael, vande Landen van Herwaertsover, inden name vande Conincklijcke Ma[je]steyt van Spaengien als Hertoghe van Brabant ter eenre, ende die Stadt van Bruessele ter ander zyden, den thienden Meerte M.D.LXXXV – terms of the surrender of Brussels.
- 1598: Cornelius Columbanus Vrancx, O.S.B., Der leecken soutere, van hondert en vijftich gheestelicke vraghen en andtwoorden. Available on Google Books
- 1599: Cornelius Columbanus Vrancx, O.S.B., Der Catholijcken hemelschen, levenden, en levenmakenden wijn. Available on Google Books
- 1610: De President ende Raetslieden van de Eerdts-hertogen ... Op't uyt-gheven ende stroyen van diversche Boecxkens. Available on Google Books
- 1613: Cornelius Columbanus Vrancx, O.S.B., Van een recht ende volmaeckt gheloove in God. Available on Google Books
- 1615: Wetten, costumen, ende statuten der stede, ende casselrye van Veurne – codification of the customary laws of Veurne. Available on Google Books
- 1617: Adrian Clais, Almanach ende prognosticatie, vanden Jaere ons Heeren M.DC.XXVII. Available on Google Books
