= Pompeo Giustiniani =

Italian military commander and author

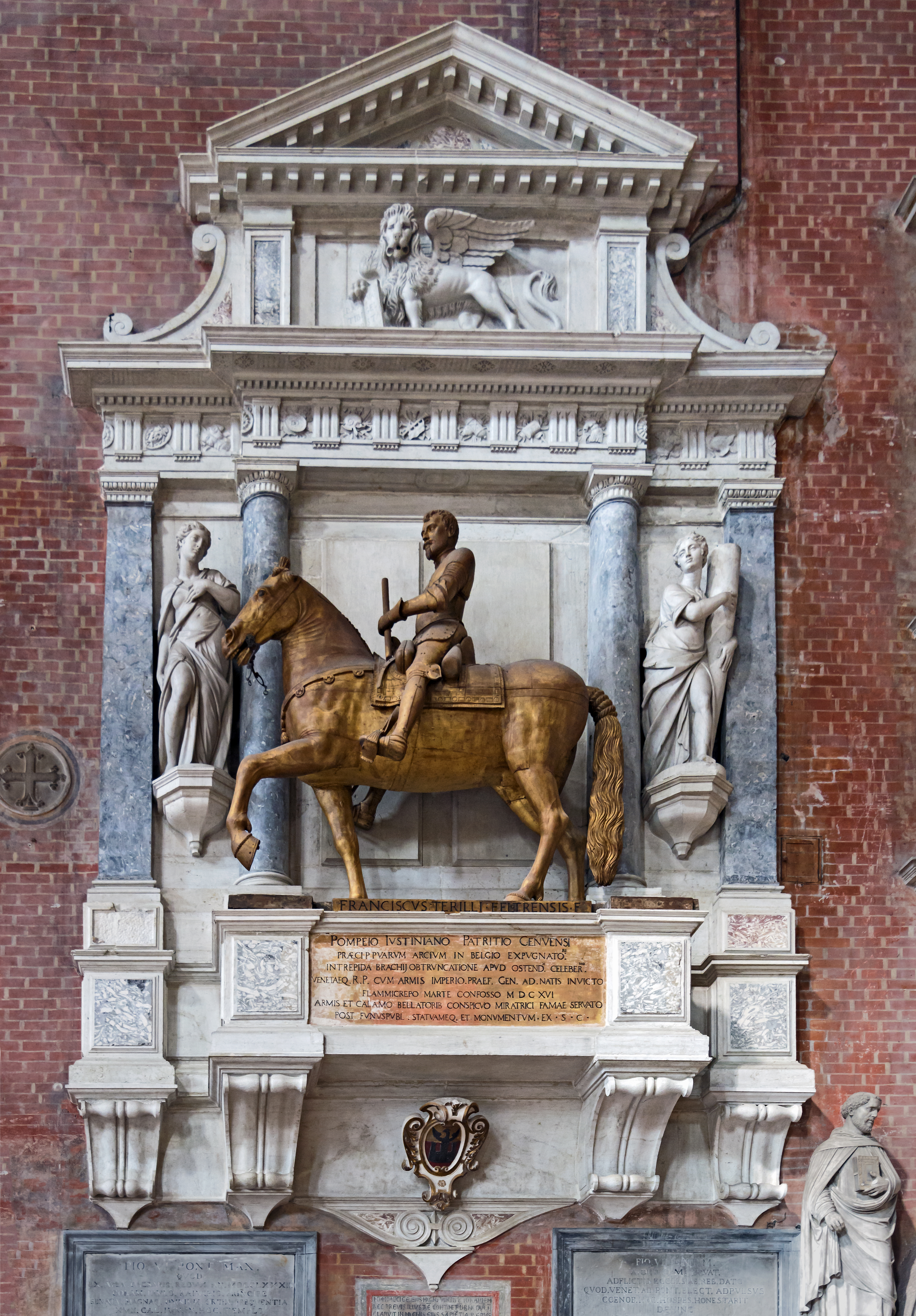
Monument to Pompeo Giustiniani

Pompeo Giustiniani (1569–1616) was an Italian military commander and author.

== Life ==
Giustiniani was born in 1569 in Ajaccio. He started his military career when he was only fourteen years old. In 1602, during the Siege of Ostend, he was promoted Maestre de campo in the Army of Flanders. Thanks to his military experience, he wrote Delle guerre di Fiandra (published in Antwerp by Joachim Trognaesius in 1609). He lost an arm in these conflicts and, from the artificial limb that he wore, came to be known by the sobriquet Bras de Fer.

In 1613 he entered service in the Venetian army. During the Uskok War, Giustiniani argued with other officials because of his promises of victory. In 1616 he besieged Gradisca, but he had to withdraw because the Habsburg forces were too strong. On 10 October 1616, he died in battle at Lucinico. He was buried in Venice, at the church of San Moisè.

== Works ==
- Delle guerre di Fiandra, Antwerp, 1609
  - reprinted Venice, 1612 (on Google Books)
  - reprinted Milan, 1615 (on Google Books)
