= Cornelis Columbanus Vrancx =

Flemish writer

Dom Cornelis Columbanus Vrancx O.S.B.
- Abbot of St Peter's Abbey, Ghent
- Church: Catholic
- Installed: 1597

Orders
- Ordination: 1560

Personal details
- Born: circa 1530 Dendermonde, County of Flanders, Habsburg Netherlands
- Died: 15 August 1615 Ghent, County of Flanders, Habsburg Netherlands
- Education: University of Leuven

Cornelis (Cornelius) Columbanus Vrancx (Dendermonde, circa 1529/1530 – Ghent, 15 August 1615) was a Flemish writer of prose, poetic refrains and spotlighted against the Reformed. He was the 60th abbot of St Peter's Abbey in Ghent from 1597 and wrote thirty-seven concise works. Cornelis Columbanus Vrancx is seen as the forerunner of the Flemish poet Adriaan Poirters.

== Life ==
Originally from Dendermonde in the County of Flanders, Vrancx studied theology at Leuven University, graduating in 1560, and in 1569 was appointed to a canonry of St Bavo's Cathedral, Ghent. After the Calvinist takeover of the city in 1578, Vrancx remained in Ghent despite the clergy of the cathedral being declared banished. He was caught and expelled in 1579, and his books and devotional objects were burnt on the market square. Vrancx travelled to Tournai, where he met refugee Benedictines from Ghent and in 1583 he was clothed as a member of their community. The community returned to Ghent in 1584, and Vrancx was professed as a monk in the abbey of St Peter. He was appointed prior in 1590, and elected abbot in 1597. He died in Ghent on 15 August 1615.

Vrancx was a renowned preacher and a prolific author of devotional and satirical verse and prose, with over 30 titles to his name. Most of these were printed by Gauthier Manilius. His most popular work, Den Troost der Sielen, includes five folk tales about spirits returned from purgatory.

== Works ==
- Het Hoochweerdich testament Christi (1569)
- Den troost der sielen int vaghevier (1572, 13 editions)
- Die gheestelijcke Maria (Ghent, 1576). Available on Google Books.
- Malleus Calvinistarum (Ghent, 1590). Available on Google Books.
- Een gheestelick paesch-ey (Ghent, 1595). Available on Google Books.
- Den Spieghel: oft Pracktijke van het Kersten gheloove (Ghent, 1596). Available on Google Books.
- Een gheestelic nieu jaer (Ghent, 1596). Available on Google Books.
- Eenen zeer schoonen gheestelicken Mey (Ghent, 1598). Available on Google Books.
- Der leecken soutere, van hondert en vijftich gheestelicke vraghen en andtwoorden (Ghent, 1598). Available on Google Books.
- Dat levende ende levenmakende hemelsch-broodt, Jesus Christus (Ghent, 1598). Available on Google Books.
- Der catholijcken hemelschen, levenden en levenmakenden wijn (Ghent, 1599). Available on Google Books.
- De costelicke maeltijdt, ende het seer groot avondtmael (Ghent, 1599). Available on Google Books.
- Den troost der sieken oft Bereydinghe totter doot (Ghent, 1600). Available on Google Books.
- Den spieghel oft practijcke der charitaten. Dat is der liefden Gods (Ghent, 1600). Available on Google Books.
- Den Troost der Sielen (Ghent, 1601). Available on Google Books.
- Een zeer schoon hoeyken vant hoochweerdich heyligh sacrament (Ghent, 1601). Available on Google Books.
- Den tweeden cout der nichten, inhoudende veel schoone mirakelen van Maria ghebenedijdt (Ghent, 1601). Available on Google Books.
- De siel-zorghe, dat is: Een tsamen-sprake tusschen Christus en ons lichaem (Ghent, 1602). Available on Google Books.
- Den Souter Der Kinderen, Van Hondert En Vijftich Gheestelicke Vraghen Ende Andt-Woorden (1603)
- Den spieghel van oodmoedicheyt (Ghent, 1605). Available on Google Books.
- D'alder costelickste Testament van onsen zalichmaker ghebenedijt (Ghent, 1609). Available on Google Books.
- Van eenen zeer machtighen coopman, die alle jaere inden vastene voor Paesschen is over commende (Ghent, 1610). Available on Google Books.
- Die verluchtinghe en verclaringhe van des coopmans eyghen rock (Ghent, 1611). Available on Google Books.
- Van een recht ende volmaeckt gheloove in God (Ghent, 1613). Available on Google Books.
- Een schoon devoot miss-boecxken (Ghent, 1613). Available on Google Books.
- Ons heeren rock, van onsen zalichmaker ghebenedijd (Ghent, 1613). Available on Google Books.
