= Jacobus Marchantius =

Historian and poet (1537–1609)

- Born: 1537; Nieuwpoort, County of Flanders, Habsburg Netherlands
- Died: 1609 (aged 71–72); Brussels, Duchy of Brabant, Habsburg Netherlands
- Education: Leuven University
- Occupations: Historian; poet; public official
- Known for: De rebus gestis à Flandriae comitibus; Flandria commentariorum

Jacobus Marchantius (1537–1609) was a historian and poet from the County of Flanders during the period that it was part of the Habsburg Netherlands.

== Life ==
Marchantius was born in Nieuwpoort in 1537 and studied Humanities at Leuven University. After graduating he became tutor to the children of Jean de Melun, lord of Antoing and Espinoy, accompanying them to Italy for two years. On returning to the Low Countries, he joined the Dutch Revolt.

In 1580 he was appointed president of the admiralty of Flanders, governor of Veurne, bailiff of Nieuwpoort, and commissioner for the equipping of the militia in western Flanders. After the royal reconquest of Flanders in 1583, he retired from public life and lived near Alveringem. He died in Brussels in 1609, and was buried in the Dominican church in that city. His son, François Marchant, became a member of the Council of Brabant.

== Writings ==
- De rebus gestis à Flandriae comitibus (Leuven, Antonius Maria Bergaingne, 1557)
- Elegiarum liber (Leuven, 1557), a collection of Latin verse
- De rebus Flandriae memorabilibus, liber singularis (Antwerp, Christopher Plantin, 1567)
- Flandria commentariorum lib. IIII (Antwerp, Plantin Press, 1596), dedicated to Archduke Albert
