= Nicolas de Montmorency =

Nicolas de Montmorency Count of Estaires
- Born: by 1556
- Died: 16 May 1617; Ghent, County of Flanders, Spanish Netherlands
- Occupation: Chief of the Council of Finance
- Spouse: Anne de Croy
- Writing career
- Language: French
- Period: 1597–1614
- Genres: prayerbooks, meditations

Nicolas de Montmorency (ca. 1556–1617), count of Estaires, was an office holder and spiritual author in the Spanish Netherlands.

== Life ==
Nicolas de Montmorency was born in by 1556, the third son of François de Montmorency, lord of Wastines, and Hélène Villain. In his youth he served in the household of Philip II of Spain. In 1583 he was appointed as Chief of Finances (president of the Council of Finance) for the Spanish Netherlands and a councillor of state. On 8 August 1611 he was made count of Estaires.

In 1604 he founded a Bridgettine convent in Lille that was early struck by a notorious case of demonic possession. The Neo-Latin poet Maximiliaan de Vriendt addressed two epigrams to him, one of which attests to his reputation for piety. He married Anne de Croy (died 12 April 1618), lady of Bermeraing, but remained childless.

He died in Ghent on 16 May 1617. His entrails were buried in the city, his heart in the family vault in Estaires, and the rest of his remains in the Bridgettine convent he had founded.

== Works ==
- Manuale principes (Douai, Balthazar Bellerus, 1597)
- Manna Absconditum (Leuven, Gerard Rivius, 1602). Available on Google Books
- Flos Campi (Leuven, Gerard Rivius, 1604). Available on Google Books.
- Exercices devots et journaliers a l'honneur du glorieux S. Joseph (Brussels, Rutger Velpius and Hubert Anthoon, 1610). Available on Google Books.
- La Semaine chrétienne (Douai, 1612)
- Fontaine d'amour divisée en sept parties, composée & recueillie à l'honneur de Dieu, pour l'entretien des âmes devotes (Brussels, Rutger Velpius and Hubert Anthoon, 1613)
  - Translated into Dutch by Adriaan van Meerbeeck as Vloeyende fonteyne der Liefde (Antwerp, Caesar Joachim Trognaesius, 1617). Reprinted Leuven, 1690.
- L'Amour de Marie divise en trois parties, faict et compose a l'honneur de Dieu & de la Vierge Marie (Brussels, Hubert Anthoon, 1614)
- Diurnale pietatis (Antwerp, Gaspar Bellerus, 1616). Available from the Deutsche Digitale Bibliothek.
