= Jodocus de Weerdt =

Belgian poet (died 1625)

Jodocus de Weerdt (Josse van Weerdt, ca. 1555-1560 in Antwerp – August 4 or 5, 1625) was a writer of Neo-Latin poetry from the Spanish Netherlands. He is remembered for the two strange collections of Latin chronograms, palindromes, acrostics, anagrams, and tautograms that are listed below. The first celebrates the Twelve Years' Truce, while the second, which appeared posthumously, covers political events in Europe from 1621 to 1625.

== Life ==
Josse de Weerdt was born in Antwerp. After studying law in Cologne, he had become syndic of Antwerp by 1609. Little else is known of his life. He is said to be buried in the Franciscan monastery in Antwerp.

== Works ==
- Concordiae Belgicae panegyricus Parnassicus. Officina Plantiniana, apud Ioannem Moretum. 1609.
- Parnassi bicipitis de pace vaticinia, chronographicis, retrogradis, acrostichis, & anagrammatis explicata. Libri dvo ... Officina Plantiniana. 1626. The prior book reprints a lightly revised text of the 1609 Panegyricus.
