= Adriaan van Meerbeeck =

Flemish writer and translator

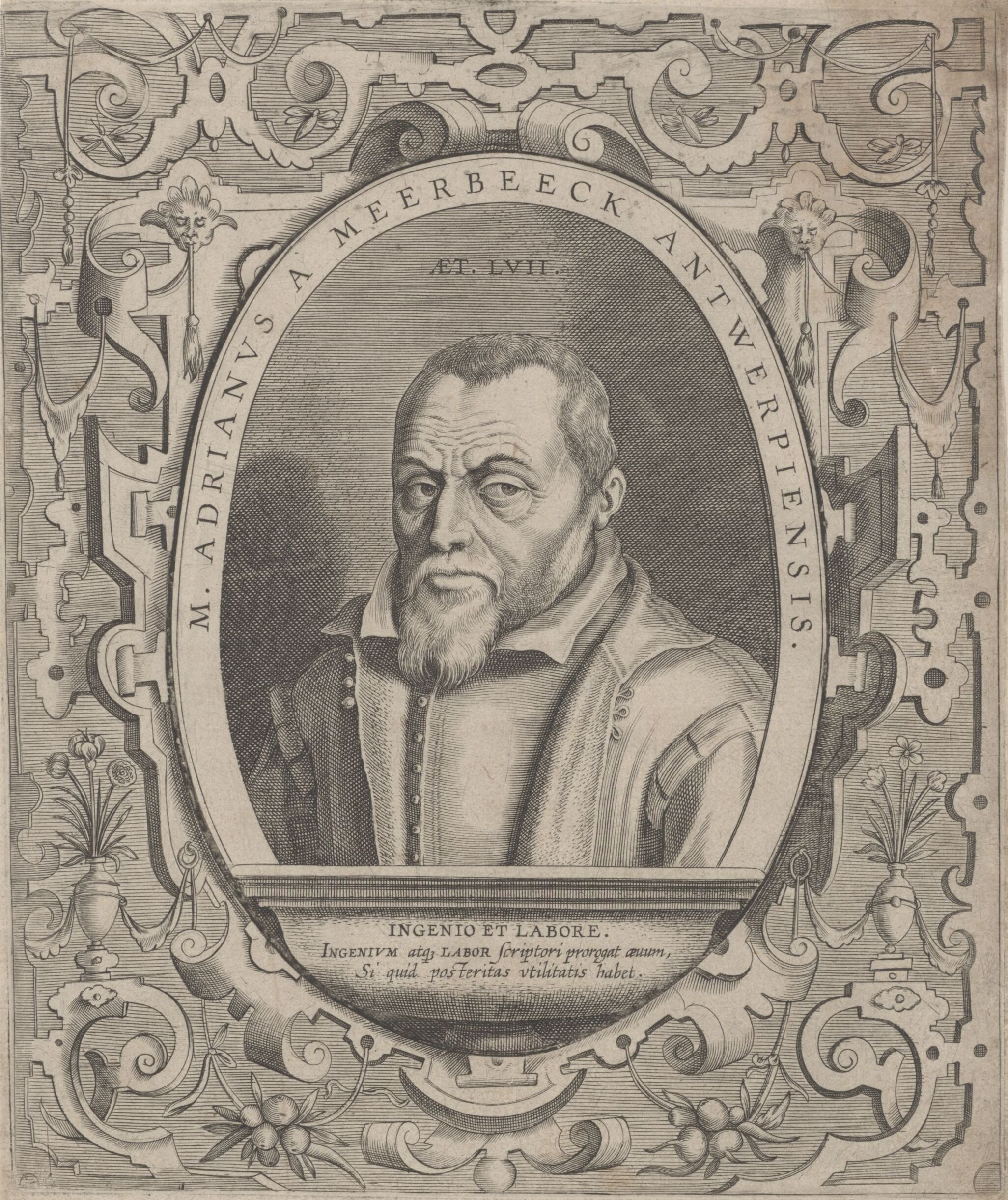
- Engraving of the author at the age of 57 (published in his Chronycke van de gantsche werelt, 1620)
- Born: 20 May 1560 (baptismal date); Antwerp, Duchy of Brabant, Habsburg Netherlands
- Died: 23 April 1643 (aged 82) (burial date); Brussels, Duchy of Brabant, Habsburg Netherlands
- Writing career
- Language: Dutch
- Years active: 1617-1625
- Genres: historian, translator
- Subjects: history, funerary literature, devotion, travel
- Notable works: Chronycke van de gantsche werelt (1620), Nederlantschen Mercurius (1625)

Adrianus or Adriaan van Meerbeeck (1560–1643) was an educator, writer and translator active in the Spanish Netherlands.

== Life ==
Meerbeeck was baptised in Antwerp on 20 May 1560. By 1600 he was headmaster of the Latin school in Aalst, where he was still living in 1625. He later moved to Brussels, where he was associated with the printer Jan van Meerbeeck, presumably a relative. His date of death is unknown, but he was buried in Brussels on 23 April 1643.

He is best known for two chronicles, Chronycke van de gantsche werelt (1620) and Nederlantschen Mercurius (1625), and for compiling accounts of the funerals of Ferdinand II of Aragon, Emperor Charles V, Philip II of Spain, Rudolph II, Philip III of Spain and Albert VII, Archduke of Austria.

== Works ==
=== Histories ===
- Chronycke van de gantsche werelt, ende sonderlinghe van de seventhien Nederlanden (Antwerp, Hieronymus Verdussen, 1620).
- Theatre funebre ou sont representéez les funerailles de plusieurs princes et la vie, trespas, et magnifiques obseques de Albert le Pie de treshaulte memoire archiduc d'Austrice, duc de Bourgoigne, Brabant, etc. (Brussels, Ferdinand de Hoeymaker, 1622).
- Tonneel der wtvaerden van Ferdinandus Coninck, Carolus Keyser, Philippus den tweeden, Rudolphus den tweeden, Phillippus den derden, midtsgaders t' leven, overlijden ende begravinghe van Albertus den godtvruchtigen ertzhertoge van Oostenrijck enz. (Brussels, Ferdinand de Hoeymaker, 1622).
- Nederlantschen Mercurius oft waerachtig verhael van de geschiedenissen van Nederlandt ende oock van Duytschlandt, Spaengien, Italien, Vranckrijck ende Turckijen, sedert den jare 1620 tot 1625 (Brussels, Jan van Meerbeeck, 1625).
- De verdervernisse ofte destructie van Jerusalem, drawn from the works of Josephus and Hegesippus; surviving only in a reprint from 1711.

=== Translations ===
- Nicolas de Montmorency, Vloeyende fonteyne der Liefde, vol allerlieffelycker oeffeninghen ende devote ghebeden (Antwerp, Caesar Joachim Trognaesius, 1617). Reprinted Leuven, 1690.
- Johannes Cotovicus, De loflycke reyse van Jerusalem ende Syrien (Antwerp, Hieronymus Verdussen, 1620).
