= Carolus Scribani =

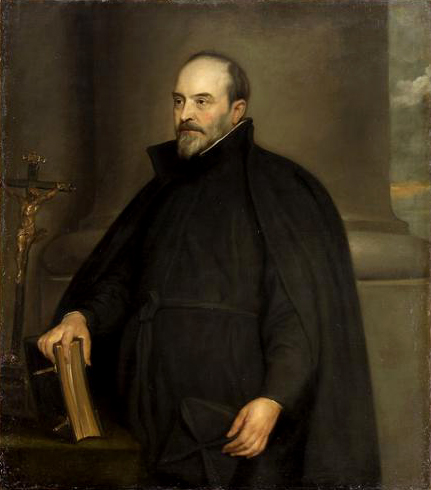
Portrait of Scribani by Anthony van Dyck, c. 1629

Carolus Scribani (1561–1629) was a Jesuit writer and educator from the Habsburg Netherlands, best known for his critique of Machiavellianism in the book Politico-Christianus.

== Life ==
Scribani was born in Brussels on 21 November 1561, the son of an Italian father and a mother from the Low Countries. His mother's brother was Laevinus Torrentius, who would later become bishop of Antwerp, and who took an active interest in his nephew's education. Scribani studied in Cologne, where he graduated Master of Arts.

Scribani entered the Society of Jesus in March 1582, and made his final profession on 10 August 1599. He served as rector of the Jesuit college in Antwerp from 1598 to 1613, overseeing its relocation to what had formerly been the English House in the city, and the conversion of its former premises into a professed house. From 1613 to 1619 he served as provincial superior of the Flandro-Belgian Province of his order, created two years before. In 1615 he took part in the seventh General Congregation in Rome. From 1619 to 1625 Scribani was rector of the Jesuit college in Brussels. He then returned to Antwerp, where he died on 24 June 1629 and was buried in the crypt of the Church of St Charles Borromeo.

== Writings ==
His publications include:

- Antverpia (Plantin Press, 1610)
- Origines Antverpiensium (Plantin Press, 1610)
- Politico-Christianus (Martinus Nutius, 1624)
