= Thomas Sailly =

Jesuit military chaplain

Thomas Sailly (1553–1623) was a Jesuit military chaplain and author of devotional writings in the Spanish Netherlands.

== Life ==
Sailly was born in Brussels on 23 April 1553, the son of Simon Sailly and Catherine de Parenty. He was raised by his maternal uncle, Philippe de Parenty, who was canon of the collegiate church of Saint-Walburga in Veurne. Sailly studied at the seminary of Ypres before obtaining degrees in Philosophy and Theology from the University of Leuven. He was himself appointed to a canonry in Veurne. Another uncle, Thomas de Parenty, was abbot of Saint-Vaast at Arras and had him appointed to a canonry in Arras Cathedral. Sailly was ordained priest on 25 January 1578, and was appointed under-regent of Marchiennes College at the University of Douai.

In 1580 Sailly joined the Society of Jesus. After his novitiate he was sent to Poland with Antonio Possevino, who was travelling as a papal envoy. In January 1585 he sent a report on this journey to Claudio Acquaviva.

On 7 September 1586 Sailly had his first audience with Alexander Farnese, Governor of the Habsburg Netherlands, who appointed him as his confessor. On 8 November 1587 the Jesuit chaplaincy to the Army of Flanders was begun under his leadership. Until Farnese's death in 1592, Sailly accompanied him on campaign, and was with him at his death in the abbey of Saint-Vaast. His letter to the governor's son describing his father's death was published as Ad serenissimum Rainutum Parma et Placentiae ducem ... epistola (Milan, 1595).

After Farnese's death, Sailly continued as head of the army chaplaincy. In 1595, he was present at the Siege of Cambrai, where he brought the last sacrament to the wounded under enemy fire. In 1596, he accompanied Archduke Albert on campaign, and his account was published as Narratio expeditionis Belgicae Ser. Archiducis Alberti ad Ambianum (Brussels, 1597). He accompanied Francisco de Mendoza, admiral of Aragon, on an embassy to Emperor Rudolf II, Sigismund III of Poland, and Ferdinand II, Archduke of Inner Austria. His account of this embassy was printed as Brevis narratio legationis Exc. D. Franc. de Mendoza (Brussels, 1598). He also accompanied Mendoza to Paris for the signing of the Peace of Vervins.

Sailly was active in the negotiations that led to the founding of a Jesuit college in Brussels in 1604, and he was rector there from 1611 to 1616. In 1620 he again became a military chaplain, in the army that invaded the Rhine Palatinate under the command of Ambrogio Spinola.

He died in Brussels on 8 March 1623.

== Writings ==
- Litania vita et passionis Domini ... pro exercitu catholico (1588)
- Le Guidon et Practique spirituelle du soldat chrétien (1590)
- Verscheyden litanien tot ghebruyck des catholijcken leghers (1595)
- Thesaurus litaniarum ac Orationum sacer (1598)
- Thesaurus precum et exercitationum spiritualium (1609)
- Den nieuwen Morgen-Wecker (1612)
- Mémorial testamentaire du soldat (1620)
