= Verdussen family =

Verdussen was a dynasty of printers in Antwerp, starting with Hieronymus Verdussen I in the late sixteenth century, and ending around 1800. Many other printers in Antwerp were also related to the Verdussens through marriage. They specialized in religious works and works in Spanish, but also published newspapers, almanachs, poetry, and scientific works. By the end of the 17th century, they produced about 21% of the Spanish books printed in the Netherlands, and with 5 presses was second only to Moretus in Antwerp. In 1876, the Verdussenstraat (Verdussen Street) was named after the family in Antwerp.

== Family tree ==
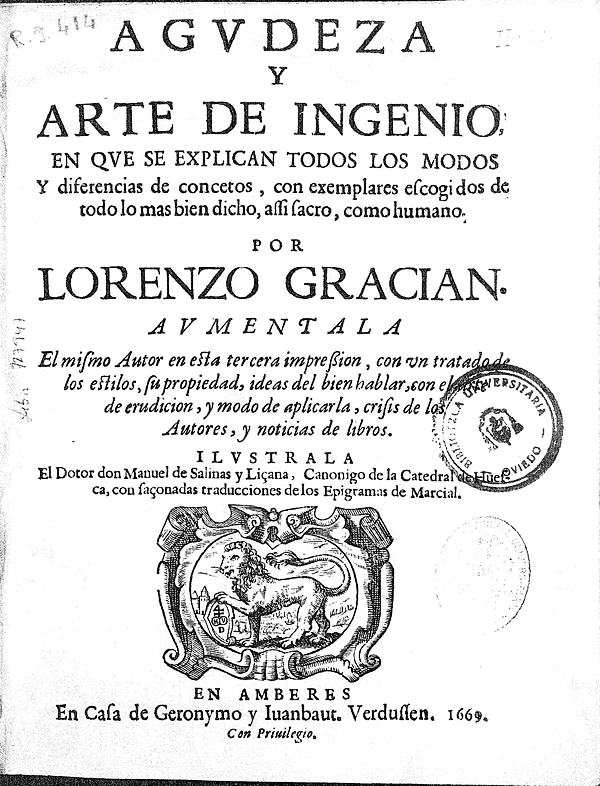
Titlepage of the Arte de ingenio by Baltasar Gracián (under the pseudonym Lorenzo Gracian), published by Hieronymus Verdussen III and Jan Baptist Verdussen in 1669

Hieronymus Verdussen (1552–1635)

- Hieronymus Verdussen II (1583–1653)
  - Hieronymus Verdussen III (1620–1687)
    - Hieronymus Verdussen V (1650–1717)
      - Hieronymus Verdussen VI
    - Hendrik Verdussen (1653–1721)
      - Cornelis Verdussen II (1706–1748)
        - Peter Antoon Verdussen (1737–1790)
          - Hendrik Peter Verdussen (1778–1857)
          - Francis Antoon Verdussen (1783–1850)
        - Jan Paul Verdussen (1738–1803)
    - Cornelis Verdussen (1661–1728)
  - Jan Baptist Verdussen (1625–1689)
    - Jan Baptist Verdussen II (1659–1759)
      - Jan Baptist Verdussen III (1698–1773)
- Marie Verdussen married printer Willem Lesteens (1590–1661)
- Willem Verdussen (1592–1667)
  - Hieronymus Verdussen IV (often confused with Hieronymus Verdussen III)
  - Jacob Verdussen
- Jan Verdussen
  - Margaretha Verdussen (1613–1668) married Artus Quellinus

The place of the other Verdussen's (if any) in this tree is unknown. Whether the painters Peter Verdussen (1662 – after 1710) and his son Jan Peter Verdussen (1700–1763) (both from Antwerp) were related to the printers is also unknown, Peter Verdussen may be the son of Jacob Verdussen, son of Willem Verdussen. Artus Quellinus, who sculpted the lion at the entrance of the publisher's shop, married Margaretha Verdussen (1613–1668) in 1640.

== Hieronymus Verdussen ==
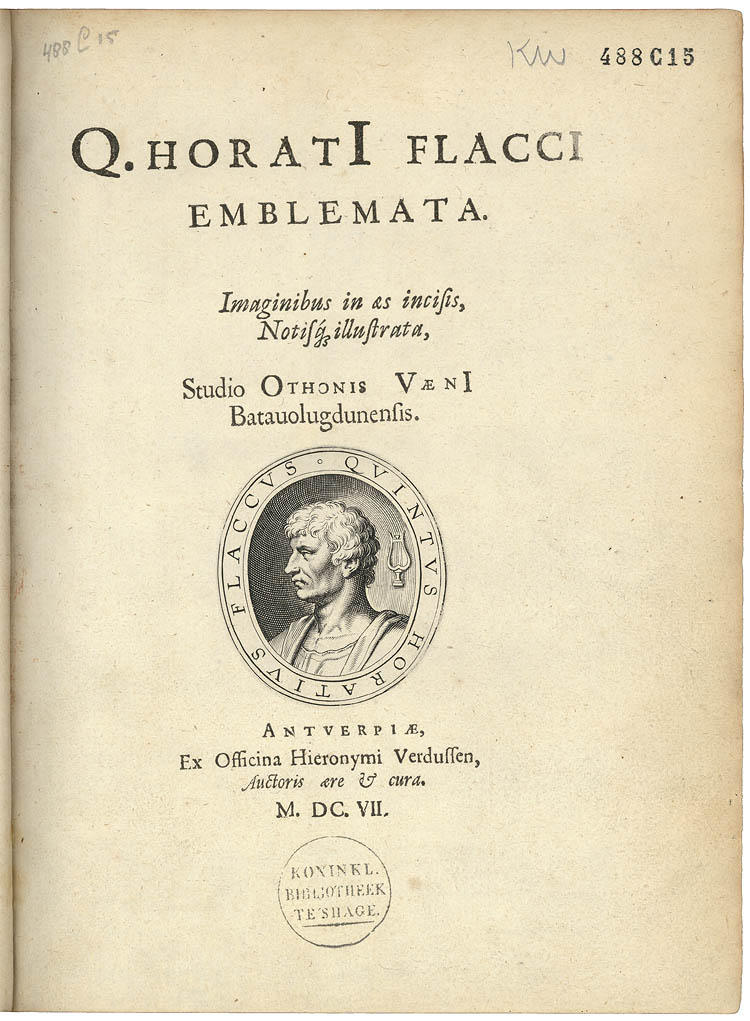
Title page of the Emblemata Horatiana by Otto van Veen, published in 1607

Hieronymus Verdussen I was the first of the Verdussen family to start printing in Antwerp, near the end of the sixteenth century. Born in 1552, he married in 1579 and died in 1635. He started working as an apprentice to the bookseller and printer Hendrick Wouters. Hieronymus entered the Guild of Saint Luke, guild of artists and bookprinters, in 1590. He bought Petrus Phalesius the Younger's printing office "De Roode Leeu" in 1606. Nearly three hundred publications by him are known.

- 1593: H. Adriani, Legende der Mirakelen ons H. Jesu Ch. en zyn Heylighen, the oldest known work printed by a Verdussen
- 1596: Terence, Comedien
- 1596: Valentijn van Goorle, Almanach ende Prognosticatie van den wonderlycken jare ons heeren 1597
- 1605: Jan van Ghelen, Baghijnken van Parijs
- 1607: Otto van Veen, Emblemata Horatiana (2 editions: 1607 and 1612; republished in Spanish by next generations of the Verdussens in 1672, 1682, 1701 and 1733)
- 1608: Otto van Veen, Amorum emblemata
- 1610: Pedro Teixeira, Relaciones del origen, descendencia y succession de los reyes de Persia y de Harmuz
- 1611: Anna Bijns, Gheestelycke refereyn
- 1611: Jean-Baptiste Gramaye, Primitae antiquitatem Gandensium – Corturiaci
- 1615: Francesco Lanario, Le Guerre di Fiandra
- 1617: Ordonnantie ende Placcaet van de Ertz-Hertoghen, en Specificatie, two booklets concerning the henceforth accepted gold and silver coins: updates printed 1618, 1619
- 1617: Antiphonarium romanum (reprinted 1622)
- 1618: Nicasius Baxius, Elegantiae rhetoricae
- 1618: Richard Verstegan, De gazette van nieuwe-maren, van de gheheele wereldt. Ghemenght met oude waerheden. Hierby is oock ghevoegt eene wederlegginghe van eenighe onbequame Nederlandtsche spreuckwoorden (1618)
- 1619: Jan Berthout, Collocutions familières, republished in 1623
- 1619: Pedro de Ribadeneira, Generale legende der Heilighen met het leven Jesu Christi ende Marie
- 1619: Johannes Cotovicus, Itinerarium Hierosolymitanum et Syriacum
  - 1620: Johannes Cotovicus, De loflycke reyse van Jerusalem ende Syrien, translated by Adriaan van Meerbeeck
- 1620: Adriaan van Meerbeeck, Chronycke van de gantsche werelt
- 1622: Benedictus van Haeften, Den Lusthof der Christelycke Leeringhe
- 1623: Muretus, Orationum, 2 volumes
- 1625: Giuliano Bossi, Breve trattato d'alcune inventioni (2 editions)
- 1625: Anna Bijns, Den gheesteleycken nachtegael
- 1627: John Bromyarde, Promptuarium concionatorum, omnibus dominici gregis pastoribus
- 1627: Trajano Boccalini, Relationi politiche, published in collaboration with Willem Lesteens (1590–1661), Hieronymus' son-in-law, who was a member of the Guild of Saint Luke since 1612 and would also publish some books under his own name. His company was continued by his son-in-law Engelbert Gymnicus in 1662, but had nearly folded by 1669.
- 1628: Zeger van Hontsum, Declaratio veridica, quod Begginae nomen
- 1629: Benedictus van Haeften, Schola cordis
- s.d.: Robr. Heusden, Rekenboeckxken

== Hieronymus Verdussen II ==
Son of Hieronymus I. Born in 1583, married in 1617, died in 1653. His name first appears on prints (as "Hieron. Verdussen, de Ionghe") in 1624. In 1630 he obtained an official monopoly on the printing of almanacs that was never enforced because of strongly organised opposition from other members of the printing trade.

- 1643: Heribert Rosweyde, Het leven ende spreucken der vaderen
- 1645: Antonius M. Schyrleus de Rheita, Ocvli Enoch Et Eliae Sive Radivs Sidereomysticvs, https://www.digitale-sammlungen.de/de/view/bsb10806644?page=2
- 1646: Anna Bijns, Konstighe refereynen
- 1650: the anonymous pamphlet "Protest van den Brabander, aen de lesers van 't Hollands praatje"

== Willem Verdussen ==
Son of Hieronymus I. Born in 1592, married in 1616, and died in 1667. Mainly known as the printer of the Extraordinarissche Post-Tijdinghen from March or April 1635 on, as a successor to Abraham Verhoeven's Nieuwe Tijdinghen, the first newspaper in the Southern Netherlands. The Post-Tijdinghen ran at least until 1645, but would continue under different titles until 1827.

- 1619, Johannes David Heemsen, Nederduytsche Poëmata
- 1627: Ghenuechelijcke ende recreatieve exempelen

== Jakob Verdussen ==
Jakob Verdussen was the son of Willem Verdussen. He continued his newspaper publications (with varying titles) until 1695, when he sold his company to Hendrik Aertsens III.

== Hieronymus Verdussen III and Jan Baptist Verdussen ==
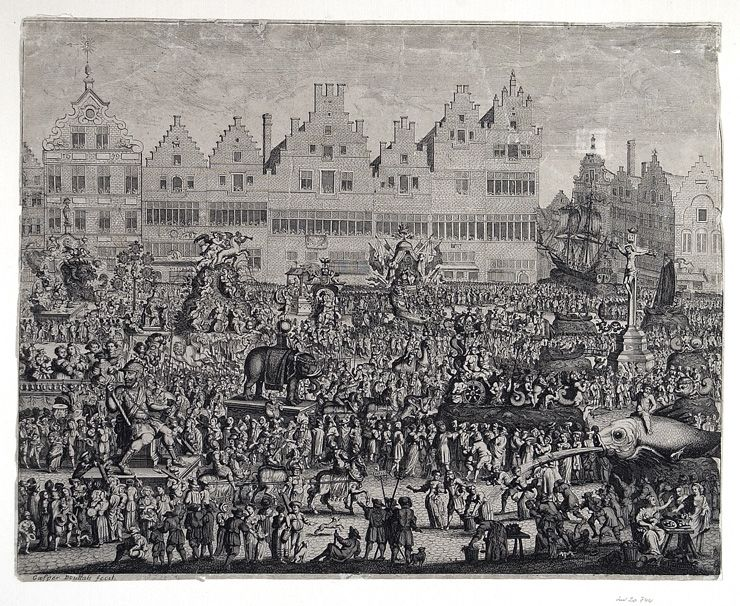
De Ommegang op de Meir by Gaspar Bouttats, 1685, published by Hieronymus III

Hieronymus III and Jan Baptist were sons of Hieronymus II. Hieronymus III was born in 1620, married in 1649, and again in 1652, entered the guild in 1657, and died in 1687. Jan Baptist was born in 1625 and died in 1689. They published some works separate, but many together, making it easier to group them together here.

- 1653: Processionale (reprint 1670, 1683)
- 1655: Diego de Saavedra Fajardo, Idea de un príncipe político cristiano, reprinted in 1659 and 1677, and included in a set of complete works by Saavedra in 1681
- 1659: Arnaud de la Porte, Den nieuwen Dictionaris oft Schadt der Duytse en Spaensche Talen (3 volumes)
- 1661: Thomas Aquinas, Commentaria in omnes D. Pauli Apostolis Epistolas
- 1662: Graduale romanum (reprint 1674, 1691)
- 1669: Baltasar Gracián, Arte de Ingenio
- 1671: Paulus Christinaeus, Commentaria in leges municipales Mechlinienses and Practicarum Quaestionum
- 1672–1673: Miguel de Cervantes, Don Quixote, 2 volumes
- 1674: Miguel de Barrios, Flor de Apolo and Las poesias famosos
- 1675: Antonio Pérez, Institutiones Imperiales Erotematibus distinctae
- 1675: Franciscus van der Zype, Opera omnia, 2 volumes
- 1676: Melchior de la Cerda, Camporum eloquentiae in causis
- 1676: Augustine of Hippo, La ciudad de Dios
- 1680: Augustine of Hippo, De doctrina christiana
- 1680: François Pomey, Novus candidatus rhetoricae, reprinted 1686
- 1681: Prudencio de Sandoval, Historia de la Vida y Hechos del Emperador Carlos V
- 1681: Mateo Alemán, Guzmán de Alfarache: reprinted in 1686
- 1683: Thomas à Kempis, De Imitatione Christi
- 1684: Juan Eusebio Nieremberg, De la diferencia entro lo temporal y eterno
- 1686: Everard Bronchorst, De diversis regulis juris antiqui
- 1687: Cornelius a Lapide, Commentaria, 6 volumes (published by the widow and sons of Hieronymus, republished some times over the next decades)
- 1687: Alonso Nuñez de Castro, Corona gothica, castellana, y austriaca
- 1688: Lucas Fernández de Piedrahita, Historia general de las Conquistas del Nuevo Reyno de Grenada

== Jan Baptist Verdussen II ==
The son of Jan Baptist Verdussen, born in 1659, died in 1759 nearly 100 years old. Printed mainly reprints from earlier Verdussen publications.

- 1695: Francis Sylvius, Opera omnia, sex tomis comprehensa (6 vols.)
- 1728: Antonio de Herrera y Tordesillas, Historia general de los hechos de los Castellanos (1728, 4 vols.)

== Hieronymus Verdussen V ==
Son of Hieronymus III. Born 1650, entered the guild 1683, died 1717.

- About 1700: Reynaert den Vos oft der Dieren Oordeel
- 1707–1730: Nieuwen almanach ofte aenwyser der daghen voor het jaer (continued by Martinus Verdussen)
- 1710: P. Suetmans, Het Brussels Moeselken pijpende verscheyden vermaeckelijcke liedekens

== Hendrik and Cornelis Verdussen ==
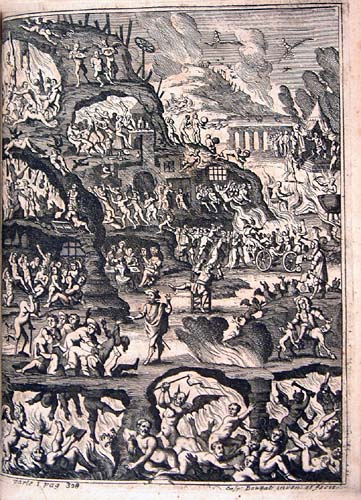
The Pluto pigsty, illustration from the Obras of de Quevedo, published in 1699 by Hendrik and Cornelis Verdussen

Cousins of Jan Baptist Verdussen II. Hendrik was the second son of Hieronymus III, born in 1653, married in 1689, entered the guild in 1691 and died in 1721. Cornelis was born in 1661, entered the guild in 1692 and died in 1728. They printed many reprints of earlier Verdussen publications as well.

- 1688: Pierre-Paul Billet, Arte para aprender la Langua Francesca
- 1699: Francisco de Quevedo, Obras, 3 volumes
- 1701: Famianus Strada, ''Primera decada [...] and Segunda decada de las guerras de Flandes, third impression
- 1707: André Tacquet, Opera mathematica, demonstrata et propugnata
- 1708: Hendrik Goltzius, Icones Imperatorum Romanorum (4 volumes, the fifth appeared nearly a century later)
- 1708: Peter Paul Rubens, Palazzi di Genova (originally published in 1622)
- 1718: Cornelius a Lapide, Commentaria in omnes Veteris et Novi Testamenti libros
- s.d., Le cabinet des plus beaux portraits ... peints par Van Dyck, 126 portrait gravures
- s.d., Theatrum pictorium Davidis Teniers (probably 1684)

== Cornelis Verdussen II ==
Son of Hendrik Verdussen. Born in 1706, married 1730, died in 1748. He was the Grand Almoner of Antwerp in 1738.

== Jan Baptist Verdussen III ==
Born in 1698. Alderman of Antwerp, member of the Académie impériale et royale des Sciences et Belles-Lettres de Bruxelles, and best known as a writer of history and a bibliophile. He wrote an Index chronologicus rerum Antverpiensium in 25 volumes, and an Index alphabeticus rerum Antverpiensium in 8 volumes. After his death in 1773, his library was sold in 1776: this contained next to a rich collection of works on national history and a number of incunables also a collection of prints of the works of Peter Paul Rubens, Anthony van Dyck, e.a.

== Hieronymus Verdussen VI ==
The son of Hieronymus Verdussen V, entered the guild in 1717, died before 1779.

== Martinus Verdussen ==
- 1730–1739: Nieuwen almanach ofte aenwyser der daghen voor het jaer (continuation of the yearly almanach published by Hieronymus IV)
- 1741: Adrianus Poirters, Het masker vande wereldt

== Cornelis III F. Verdussen ==
Active around 1753–1765.

== Hieronymus Verdussen VII ==
Hieronymus Jan Verdussen, active around 1776, died in 1794.

- 1793–1794: Directorium Antverpiense: continued by his widow until 1797

== Peter Antoon Verdussen ==
Son of Cornelis II, born in 1737, married in 1767, died in 1790. His widow continued the company until she sold the machines in 1834.

== Jan Paul Verdussen ==
Son of Cornelis II, born in 1738, died without issue in 1803. Entered the guild in 1766, became dean of the guild in 1779. Alderman of Antwerp in 1790.

== Hendrik Peter Verdussen ==
Hendrik Peter (or Henri Pierre, as he was also known) Verdussen was born in Antwerp on 14 August 1778 as the son of Peter Antoon. He worked in his youth in the publishing shop of his father. His library of over 6000 items was sold after his death in 1857, ending the history of the publishing house of Verdussen.

His brother Frans Antoon (1783–1850) was a member of Parliament, a Knight in the Order of Leopold, and a writer who was a leading member of the Flemish Movement around 1840. After the Belgian Revolution in 1830, he became Mayor of Antwerp for two days, and afterwards served as Alderman of the city.

== Sources ==
- Visschers, Pieter Jozef (1857). Lykrede over den achtbaren en geleerden heer Hendrik Peeter Verdussen (in Dutch). Antwerp: P. E. Janssens.
- Vollen, A. (1858). Catalogue de la belle collection de livres et de manuscrits délaissée par Mr Henri Pierre Verdussen (in French). J. P. Van Dieren.
- Sabbe, Maurits (1923–1936). Briefwisseling van de gebroeders Verdussen 1669-1672, 2 vols. Antwerpen: Museum Plantin-Moretus. p. 143.
- Le Clercq, Léopold (1933). Les Verdussen, imprimeurs-libraires et bibliophiles anversois. leClercq. p. 129.
- Short Title Catalogue Vlaanderen, a database of books printed in Flanders in the seventeenth and eighteenth centuries
