= 1621 in Belgium =

- Decades: 1630s
- See also: Other events of 1621; List of years in Belgium

Events in the year 1621 in the Spanish Netherlands and Prince-bishopric of Liège (predecessor states of modern Belgium).

== Incumbents ==
=== Habsburg Netherlands ===
Monarch – Albert and Isabella (until 13 July); Philip IV, King of Spain and Duke of Brabant, of Luxembourg, etc.

Governor General – from 14 July: Isabella Clara Eugenia, Infanta of Spain

=== Prince-Bishopric of Liège ===
Prince-Bishop – Ferdinand of Bavaria

== Events ==
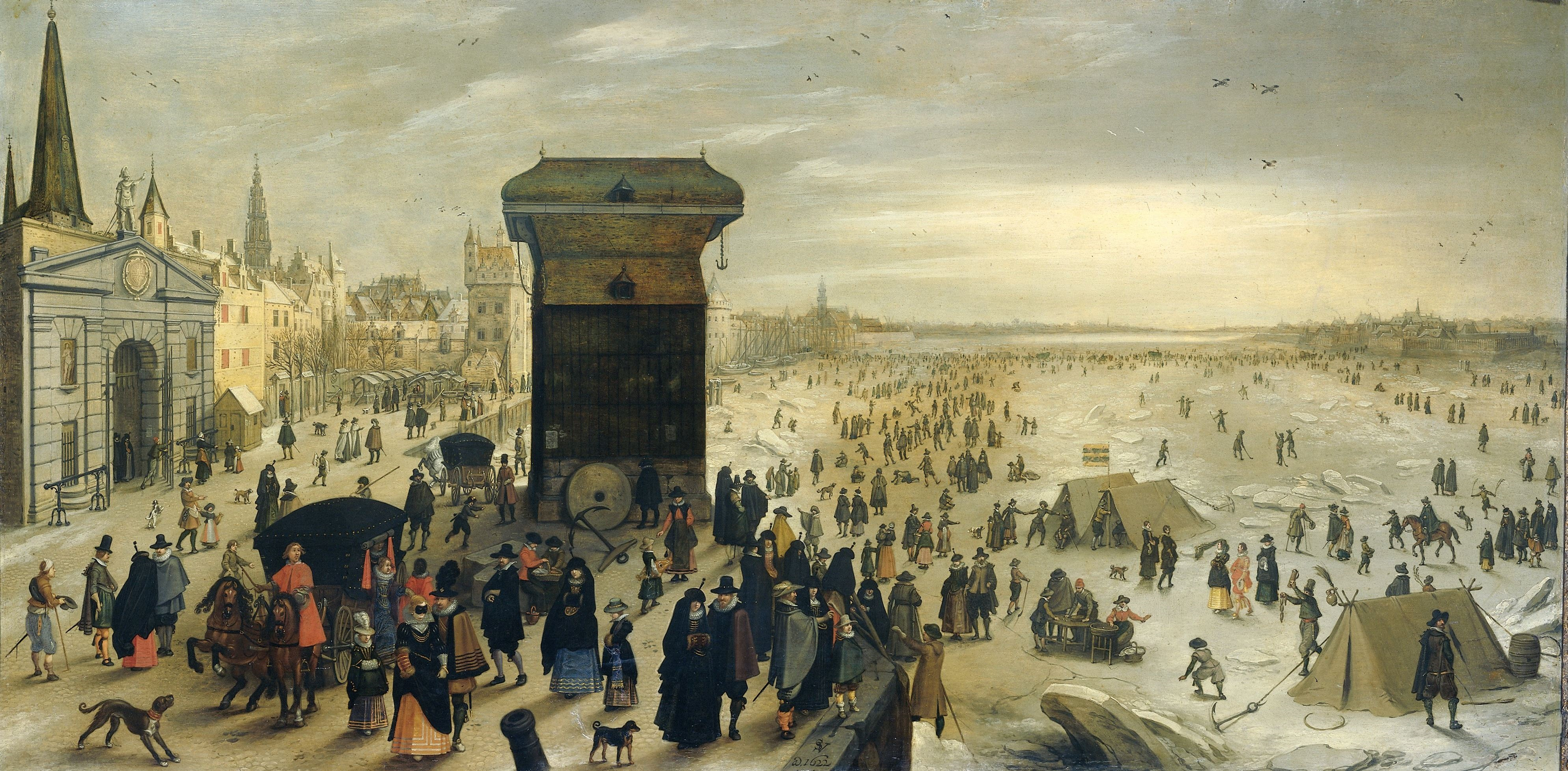
Sebastiaen Vrancx, Winter Pastime on the River Scheldt in Antwerp, 1622 (Rijksmuseum)

- February – Frost fair on the River Scheldt in Antwerp.
- 8 March – Albert and Isabella prohibit their subjects from leaving the country to enlist in foreign armies.
- 21 April – Twelve Years' Truce expires and the Eighty Years' War with the Dutch Republic resumes.
- 2 May – City of Leuven institutes new regulations for the city watch
- 22 May – Memorial services held for Philip III of Spain in Antwerp and Brussels.
- 13 July – Archduke Albert's death ends the joint sovereignty of Archdukes Albert and Isabella
- 14 July – Brussels Privy Council proclaims Philip IV of Spain as sovereign of the Habsburg Netherlands, in a decree signed by Engelbert Maes and Louis Verreycken.

== Art and architecture ==
Jan Brueghel the Younger, St Hubert, 1621 (Bavarian State Painting Collections)

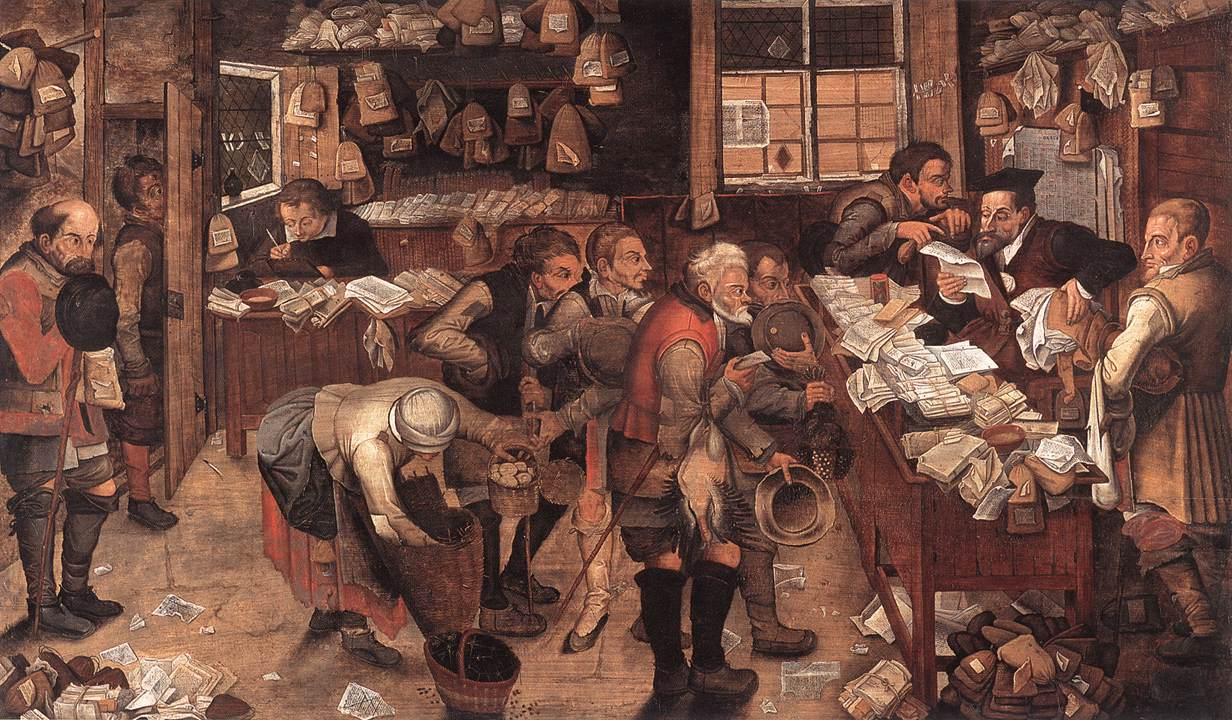
Pieter Brueghel the Younger, Village Lawyer, 1621 (Museum of Fine Arts, Ghent)

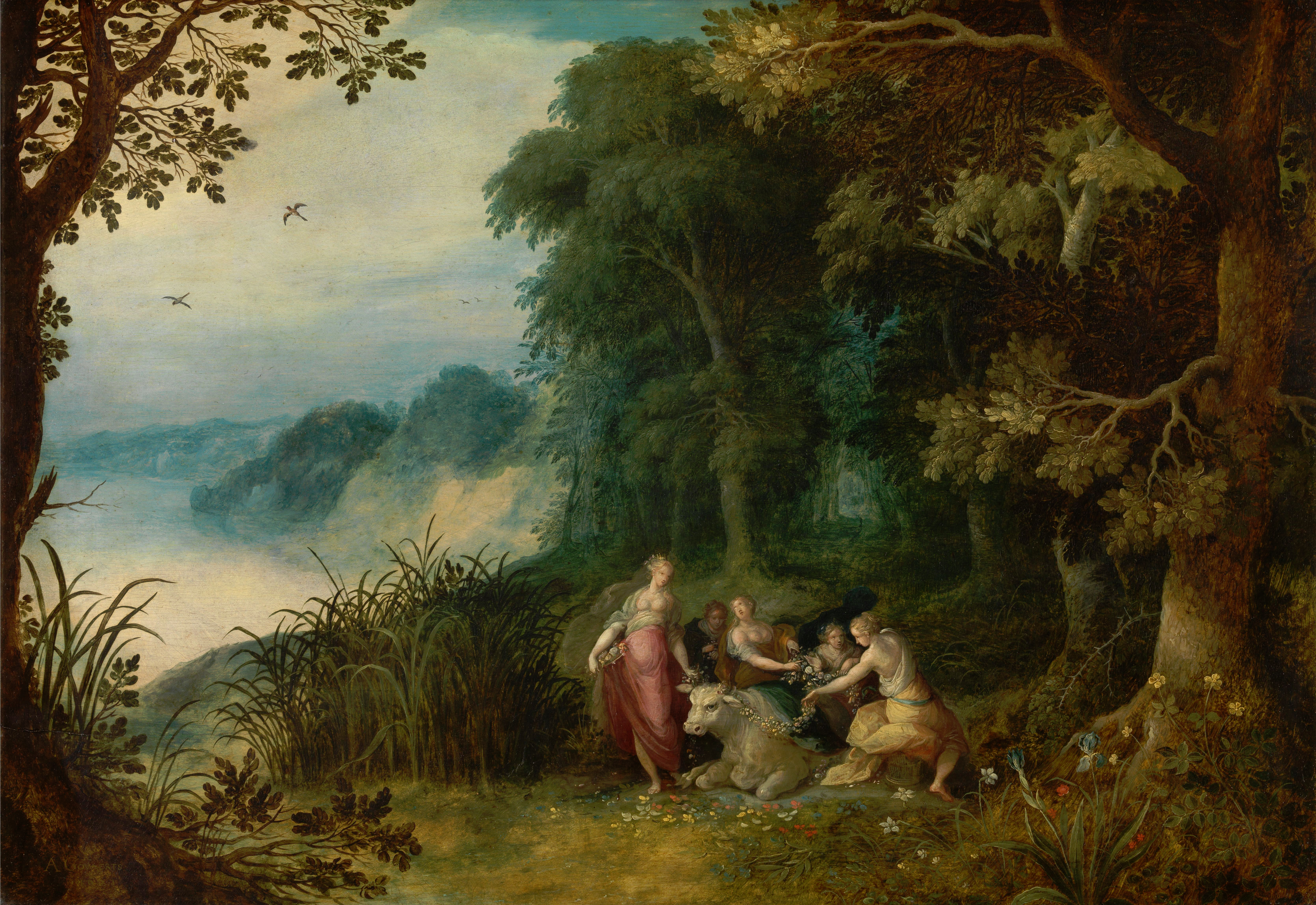
Abraham Govaerts and Frans Francken the Younger, The Rape of Europa, 1621 (Royal Museum of Fine Arts Antwerp)

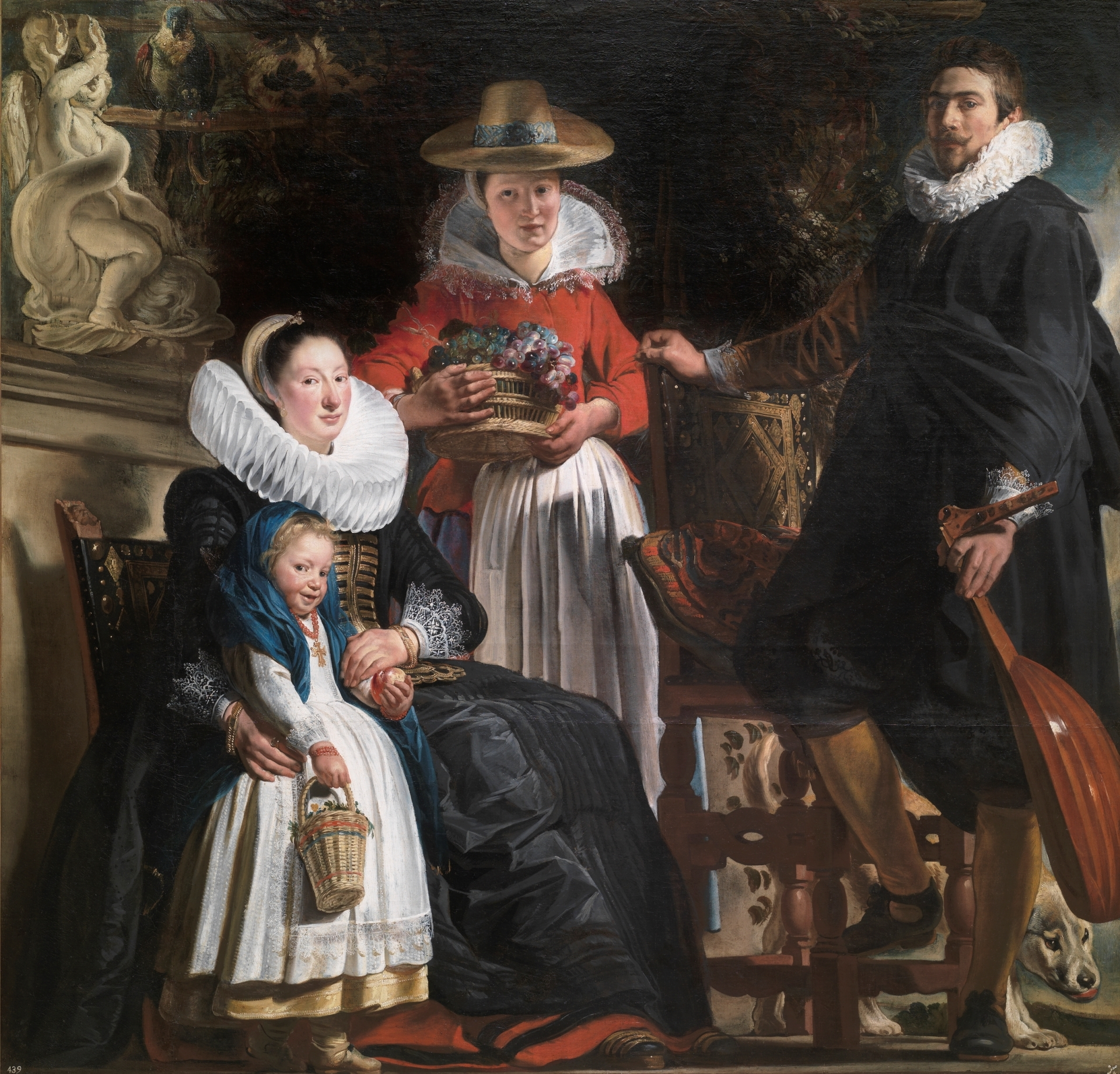
Jacob Jordaens, The Family of the Artist, c. 1621 (Museo del Prado)

Frans Snyders and Anthony van Dyck, Fish Market, c. 1621 (Kunsthistorisches Museum)

Anthony van Dyck, Susanna Fourment and Her Daughter, 1621 (National Gallery of Art)

- Jan Brueghel the Younger, St Hubert
- Pieter Brueghel the Younger, Village Lawyer
- Abraham Govaerts and Frans Francken the Younger, The Rape of Europa
- Jacob Jordaens, The Family of the Artist (c. 1621)
- Frans Snyders and Anthony van Dyck, Fish Market (c. 1621)
- Anthony van Dyck, Susanna Fourment and Her Daughter

== Publications ==
- Antoine de Balinghem, Zōopaideia, seu morum a brutis petita institutio ordine alphabetico tum virtutum tum vitiorum (Saint-Omer, Charles Boscard)
- Augustine of Hippo, The meditations and manuall of the incomparable doctour, translated by J. Floyd ([Saint-Omer, English College Press])
- Benedict of Nursia, La Règle traduitte nouvellement en langue vulgaire, translated by François Sylvius (Douai, Marc Wyon)
- Laurentius Beyerlinck, Laudatio funebris D. Philippi III Hispaniarum et Indiarum regis, dicta in exequiis ejusdem celebratis in ecclesia cathedrali Antuerpiensi, die XXII. mensis maij, M.DC.XXI (Antwerp, Plantin Press)
- Étienne Binet, Consolation et resiouissance pour les malades et personnes affligées (Arras, Guillaume de la Rivière)
- Étienne Binet, La fleur des pseaumes (Arras, Guillaume de la Rivière)
- Francisco de Bivero, Sermon en las honras que se celebraron a la muerte de Philipe Tercero en Bruselas a los 22 de mayo de 1621 (Brussels, Hubert Anthoon)
- Richard Broughton, English protestants plea, and petition, for English priests and papists ([Saint-Omer, Charles Boscard])
- Bruges, Wetten ende costumen der Stede van Brugghe (Bruges, Guillaume de Neve)
- Claudius Chappuisot, Oraison Funebre sur la mort de ce treshaut, trespuisa[n] & trescatholique Prince Albert (Brussels, Jan Pepermans)
- Jean-Jacques Chifflet, Lacrymae prisco ritu fusae in exsequiis sereniss. archiducis Alberti pii, Belgicae Sequaniciq. principis (Antwerp, Balthasar I Moretus)
- Philippe Chifflet, In obitum Philippi III: Hispaniarum Regis Catholici elegia (anonymously published)
- Philippe Chifflet, Regrets funebres sur le trespas de sa Maiesté Catholique Philippe III, Roy des Espagnes (anonymously published)
- Clare of Assisi, The Rule of our Holy Mother S. Clare ([Saint-Omer, English College Press])
- Wenceslas Cobergher, Apologia ofte Bescherm-redenen teghen het kekelen van de onredelijcke vyanden, ende oock de tegenraeders, van de berghen van bermherticheyt (Mechelen, Henry Jaye)
- [Discalsed Carmelites], La maniére de recevoir filles, ou donner l'habit aux Novices en tous les Couvents des Religieuses Carmelites de la premiere observance, nommées les dechaussées (Brussels, Hubert Anthoon)
- Thomas Doughty, A briefe discoverie of the crafte & pollicie which Protestant ministers use in seducing theire followers by preaching and publishing theire owne words for the word of God ([Mechelen, Henry Jaye])
- Jaspar d'Ennetières, La vie de sainct Malchus moine Syrien tiree des epistres de S. Hierosme (Tournai, Adrien Quinqué)
- Jan Franco, Kalender oft journael voor het jaer ons heeren Jesu Christi, M.D.C.XXI. (Antwerp, widow of Arnout Conincx)
- Libertus Fromondus, Serenissimi Belgarum principis Alberti pii laudatio funebris (Leuven, Hendrik van Hastens)
- Antoine Girardin, Les larmes, & alarmes de la muse guerriere, sur la mort de Charles de Longueval comte de Bucquoy l'Hercule Belgique (anonymously printed)
- Nicolas de Guise, Mons Hannoniae metropolis, interiecta Comitum Hannoniae chronologia brevi, usque ad Philippum secundum (Cambrai, Jean de La Rivière)
- Diego de Guzman, Histoire de la vie et mort de madame Marguerite d'Austriche reyne d'Espagne femme de Philippes troisiesme n'agueres decedé (Lille, Pierre de Rache)
- Philippe de Harvengt, Opera omnia (Douai, Balthazar Bellerus)
- Jan David Heemssen, Den nachtegael vanden heyligen Bonaventura, waer in hy beschryft een corte overdenckinge van de geboorte, leven, leyden, ende doodt Christi ons salighmaeckers (Leuven, Philippus van Dormael)
- Jan Hemelaers, Angeli custodis ad Hugonem Grotium super nupero eius carcere paraeneticon (Antwerp, Plantin Press)
- Matthew Kellison, The Right and Jurisdiction of the Prelate, and the Prince. Or, A treatise of ecclesiasticall, and regall authoritie ([Douai, Pierre Auroi])
- Cornelius Lancilottus, D'Leven van den H. vader S. Augustijn bisschop van Hipponen ende leeraer der H. kercke (Antwerp, Cornelis and Martinus Verschueren)
- Janus Lernutius, De natura et cultu Karoli I comitis Flandriae, necnon de caede ipsius et vindicta in percussores mox busecuta (Bruges, Guillaume de Neve)
- Leonardus Lessius, A consultation what faith and religion is best to be imbraced ([Saint-Omer, English College Press])
- Leonardus Lessius, The treasure of vowed chastity in secular persons ([Saint-Omer, English College Press])
- Lille, Coustumes et usages generaux de la Salle, bailliage et chastellenie de Lille (Lille, Christophe Beys)
- Lodewijk Makeblijde, Troost der siecken ende der overleden (Antwerp, Hieronymus Verdussen)
- Johannes Malderus, Tafel oft lijste vande boecken die in de scholen sullen mogen gheleert worden (Antwerp, Joannes Cnobbaert)
- Aubertus Miraeus, De Bello Bohemico Ferdinandi II (Brussels, Jan Pepermans)
- Willem van Nieuwelandt, Poëma vanden mensch inhoudende d'ijdelheydt des werelts, d'ellende des levens, ende ruste des doodts (Antwerp, Guilliam van Tongheren)
- Gerlac Peterson, De innighe alleen-sprake ('s-Hertogenbosch, Anthoni Scheffer)
- Peter Philips, Gemmulae sacrae binis et ternis vocibus. Editio altera. Cantus (Antwerp, Petrus Phalesius the Younger)
- Jean Roberti, Curationis magneticae (Luxembourg, Hubertus Reulandt)
- Jean Roberti, Historia S. Huberti, principis Aquitani, ultimi Tungrensis, & primi Leodiensis episcopi, eiusdemque urbis conditoris: Arduennae Apostoli; Magni Thaumaturgi (Luxembourg, Hubertus Reulandt)
- Jean Roberti, Modesta Responsio Ad perniciosam Disputationem Jo. Baptistae ab Helmont Bruxellensis Medici Pyrotechnici (Luxembourg, Hubertus Reulandt)
- Heribert Rosweyde, Vindiciae Kempenses, pro libello Thome a Kempis De imitatione Christi, adversus Constantinum Caietanum: accedit Commonitorium ad eundem adversus eiusdem Apologiam (Antwerp, Petrus and Joannes Bellerus)
- Justus Rycquius, Pietas, in funere Philippi III (Antwerp, Plantin Press)
- Antonius Sanderus, Lacrymae in funere Alberti Austriaci optimi et clementiss. Belgarum principis (Antwerp, Plantin Press)
- Carolus Scribani, Adolescens prodigus: succumbit vitiis, redit ad se, & in omnem aetatem ac fortunam a virtute instruitur (Antwerp, Martinus Nutius and bros.)
- Carolus Scribani, Den geestelycken wyngaert (Antwerp, Hieronymus Verdussen)
- Richard Smith, Of the author and substance of the protestant church and religion ([Saint-Omer, English College Press])
- Andres de Soto, Declaracion de los bienes y excellencias de la paz (Antwerp, Joachim Trognaesius)
- Joannes Stalpaert van der Wiele, Evangelische schat Christus Iesus ondeckt ('s-Hertogenbosch, Jan III Scheffer)
- Jan Thieullier,Porphyre en Cyprine: treur-spel verthoont by de redenrijcke gulde die Peoen binnen Mechelen den derden mey anno 1620 (Mechelen, Henry Jaye)
- Jan Thieullier (ed.), De schadt-kiste der philosophen ende poeten (Mechelen, Henry Jaye)
- Andreas Trevisius, In obitu serenissimi archiducis Alberti Pii Belgarum Prinicpis ad clarissimum virum D. Erycium Puteanum (Brussels, Ferdinand de Hoeymaecker)
- Diodorus Tuldenus, De principiis jurisprudentiae libri IV (Leuven, Philip van Dormael)
- Valenciennes, Coustumes de la ville, ban-lieu et chef-lieu de Valenciennes (Valenciennes, Jean Vervliet)
- Valerius Maximus, Dictorum factorumque memorabilium libri IX, edited by Justus Lipsius (Antwerp, Jan van Keerberghen)
- Nicolaus Vernulaeus, Justa Alberto pio Belgarum principi (Leuven, Philip van Dormael)
- Nicolaus Vernulaeus, Oratio funebris in obitum Alberti archiducis Austriae, ducis Burgundiae, principis Belgarum. Habita Lovanij in aede d. Petri, cum ei solemnibus exequijs Academia parentaret (Leuven, Hendrik Hastens)
- Richard Verstegan, Observations concerning the present affaires of Holland and the United Prouinces, made by an English gentleman there lately resident, & since written by himselfe from Paris, to his friend in England ([Saint-Omer, English College Press])
- Richard Verstegan, De spiegel der Nederlandsche elenden (Mechelen, Henry Jaye)
- Alonso de Villegas, The lives of saints. Written in Spanish by the learned and reverend father, Alfonso Villegas, divine, of the order of Saint Dominick. Translated out of Italian into English, and diligentlie compared with the Spanish. Whereunto are added the lives of sundrie other saints of the universall church ([Saint-Omer, Charles Boscard for] John Heigham)
- Joannes Wachtendonck, Laudatio funebris ser.mi ac pot.mi principis Alberti VII archiducis Austriae Ducis Burgundiaen, Brabantiae, totius Belgij dynastae &c. Habita Mechliniae in exequiis eiusdem prid. non. octob. 1621 (Mechelen, Henry Jaye)
- Matthaeus Wesenbeck, Commentaria in Pandectas Juris Civilis et Codicis Justiniani (Antwerp, Jan van Keerberghen)

News prints and pamphlets

- Copie vanden keyserlijcken ban, den 29. ianuarius 1621. Binnen Weenen ghepubliceert, teghen Fredericus pals-graue upden Ryn, als hooft vande Bohemsche rebellen (Ghent, Judocus Dooms)
- La Cruauté et tyrannie exercée en la personne du tresvaleureux Capitaine Monsieur le Comte de la Richarderie (Lille, Pierre de Rache)
- De vita & morte Philippi III. Hispaniarum indiarumque regis catholici, augustae memoriae (Antwerp, Abraham Verhoeven)
- Discours veritable de la grande victoire qu'ont obtenu les Polacques contre les Turcs, ou ont esté tué huit mille desdits Turcs & quinze mille Tartares ont esté defait & mis en desroutte. Avec certaines nouvelles d'Allemaigne, Austriche, France & Hongrie (Antwerp, Abraham Verhoeven)
- L’Estat present des affaires Tant d’Allemagne, Espagne que France. Ensemble la réduction de la ville de Presbourg Capitalle du Royaume de Hongrie en l’obeissance de sa Maiesté Imperialle, par la vaillantise du Comte de Bucquoy (Lille, Pierre de Rache)
- La Grande et signalee victoire obtenue par Sigismondus Roy de Pouloigne, contre l’armée d’Ottoman Empereur des Turcs, en la Valachie, où ont esté deffaits cet mille Turcs & Tartares (Lille, Pierre de Rache)
- Een nieu liedeken van de sterckte des ijs, alsoomen over 't Schelt gaet by Antwerpen (Antwerp, Abraham Verhoeven)
- Pourtraict de la forte ville de Juliers, avecq le siege mis devant icelle (Antwerp, Abraham Verhoeven)
- Recit veritable de la sortie qu’ont faict ceux de la Ville de l’Escluse, pensant à surprendre le nouveau Fort, nommé de Grootesterre, proche du Fort de S. Anne ter Muyen (Lille, Pierre de Rache)
- Relation touchant le renouvellement de la Cour & du Conseil d’Espagne, ensemble la disgrâce du duc d’Alerme, & de ses enfans, & l’emprisonnement du duc d’Ossuna, depuis le couronnement de sa Maiesté Philippes III (Lille, Christophe Beys)
- La Sentence et arrest de Mort, prononcée par le Conseil d’Espagne, contre Don Rodrigo de Calderon, lequel a esté exécuté publiquement dans la ville de Madril, par le commandement du Roy (Lille, Pierre de Rache)
- Vraye pourtraicture du pont faict sur des barcques au trauers de l'Escalde deuant la ville d'Anuers, qui fut commencé le 23. de mars 1621. waerachtighe afbeeldinghe, hoe ende in wat manieren de brugghe voor Antwerpen over de Schelde is begost te maecken (Antwerp, Abraham Verhoeven)

Periodicals

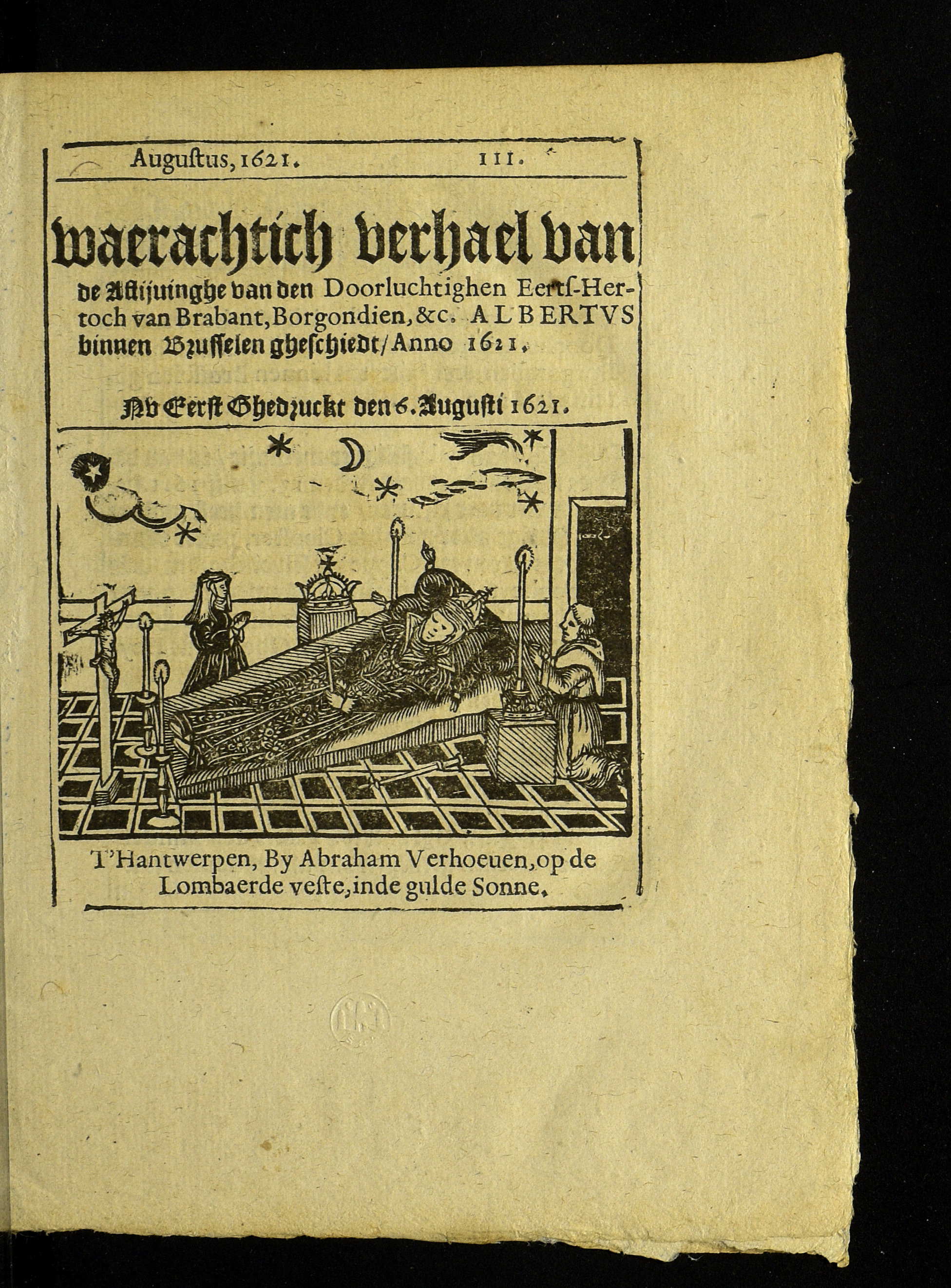
Nieuwe Tijdinghen, 6 August 1621, with news of Archduke Albert's lying in state

- Nieuwe Tijdinghen (Antwerp, Abraham Verhoeven), ongoing
- Nouvelles neutrelles ([Brussels, Hubert Anthoon])

== Births ==
- 28 July (baptism) – Andries Bosman, priest-painter (died c. 1681)
- 12 August – Albert d'Orville, Jesuit missionary (died 1662)
- 8 October – Maximilian Henry of Bavaria, prince-bishop of Liège (died 1688)

Date uncertain

- Joannes van Heymissen, Cistercian (died 1678)

== Deaths ==
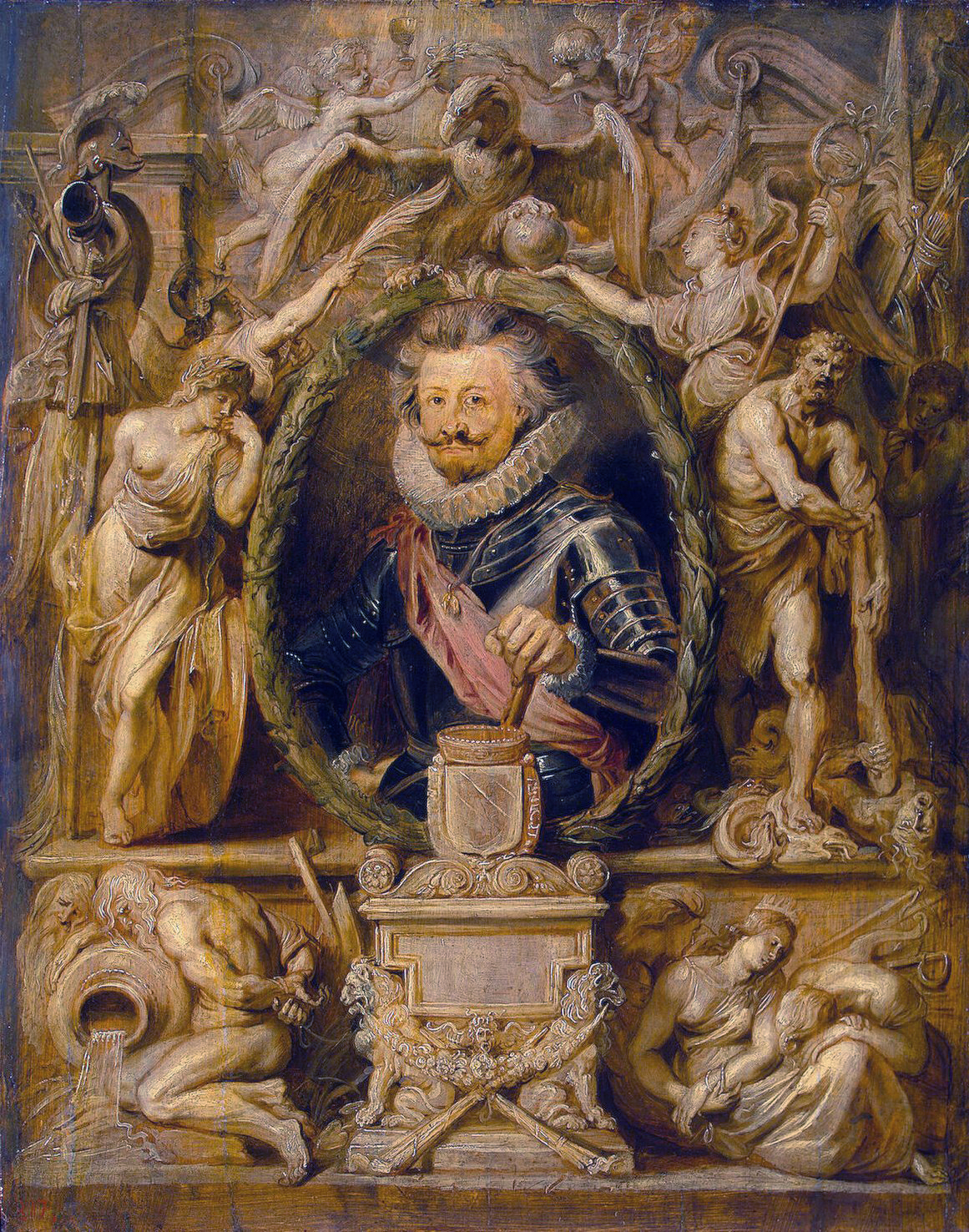
Peter Paul Rubens, Charles Bonaventura de Longueval, Count de Bucquoi, 1621

- 4 March – Ana de Jesús (born 1545), Carmelite
- 31 March – Philip III of Spain (born 1578), heir presumptive to the Archdukes Albert and Isabella
- 10 July – Charles Bonaventure de Longueval, 2nd Count of Bucquoy (born 1571), commander
- 13 July – Albert VII of Austria (born 1559), Archduke
- 13 August – Jan Berchmans (born 1599), student
- 23 October – Louis Verreycken (born 1552), government official
- 26 December – Adriaan van Schrieck (born 1560), humanist
- 27 December – Pedro Coloma, Baron of Bornhem (born 1556), soldier

Date uncertain

- Paul van Somer (born c. 1577), artist
