= 1622 in Belgium =

- Decades: 1630s
- See also: Other events of 1622; List of years in Belgium

Events in the year 1622 in the Spanish Netherlands and Prince-bishopric of Liège (predecessor states of modern Belgium).

== Incumbents ==
=== Habsburg Netherlands ===
Monarch – Philip IV, King of Spain and Duke of Brabant, of Luxembourg, etc.

Governor General – Isabella Clara Eugenia, Infanta of Spain

=== Prince-Bishopric of Liège ===
Prince-Bishop – Ferdinand of Bavaria

== Events ==
Drummers and trumpeters in Archduke Albert's funeral cortège

- 22 January – Brussels government issues regulations for collecting import duty on horses brought from or through the Dutch Republic
- 7 February – Mount of Piety established in Liège.
- 12 March – Funeral in Brussels of Archduke Albert (died 1621)
- 31 March – Brussels government decrees that trade with the Dutch Republic only be by navigable waterways and under a system of tariffs and licences.
- 13 July – City of Antwerp orders expulsion of vagabonds.
- 18 July – Ambrogio Spinola begins Siege of Bergen op Zoom
- 13 August – Prince-Bishop of Liège prohibits recruitment for foreign armies and orders the expulsion of vagabonds.
- 29 August – Battle of Fleurus
- 2 October – Siege of Bergen op Zoom raised
- 19 October – Government in Liège prohibits the diversion of the river Demer.
- 18 November – Brussels Privy Council restricts the export of hops.
- 8 December – Government of Liège orders the expulsion of "those known as Egyptians".

== Art and architecture ==
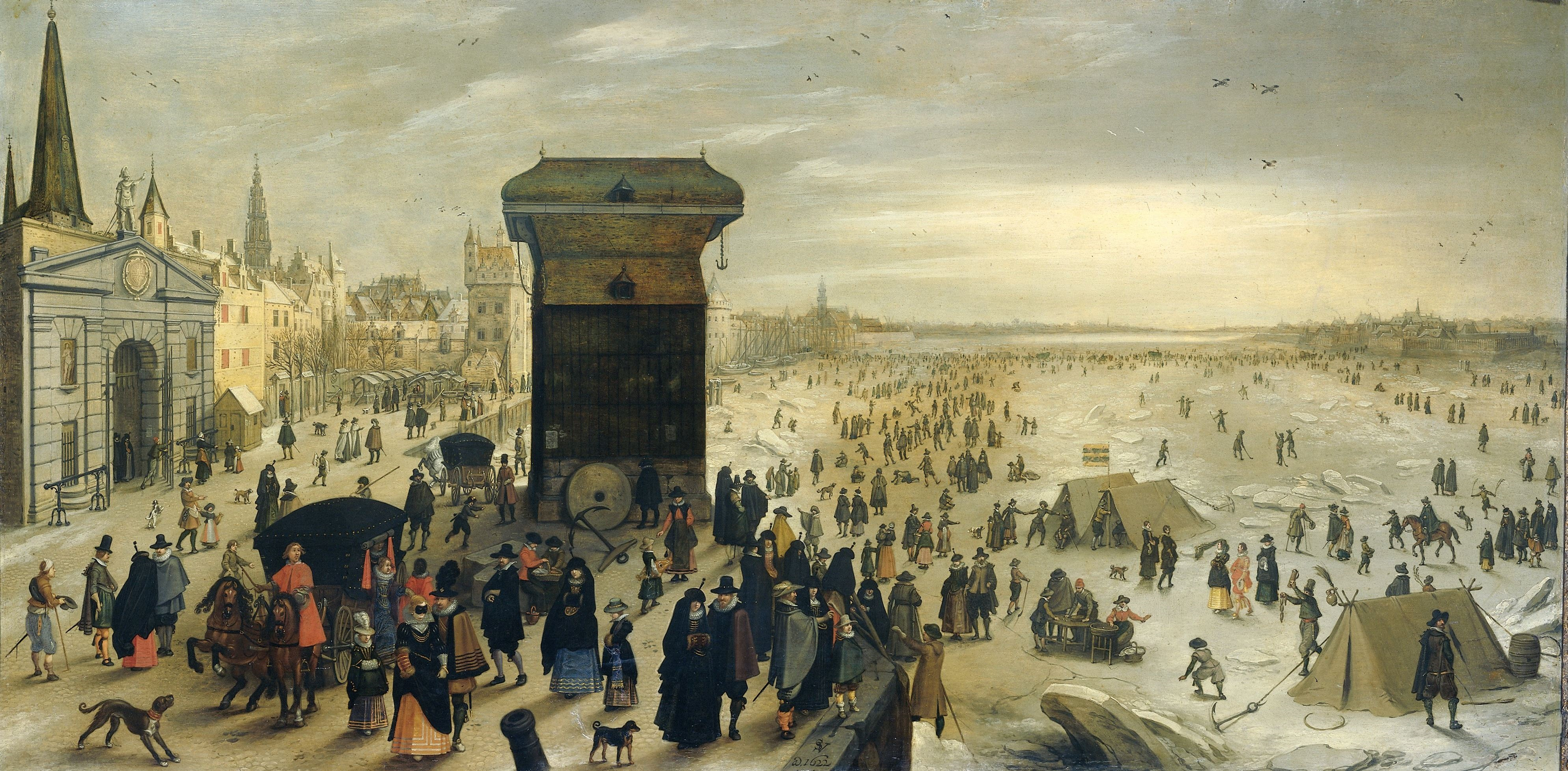
Sebastiaen Vrancx, Winter Pastime on the River Scheldt in Antwerp, 1622 (Rijksmuseum)

- 16 February – Peter Paul Rubens signs a contract with Marie de' Medici for a series of at least 25 paintings.

Buildings

Brewer's house Den Ancker (The Anchor) in Leuven

- Brewer's house Den Ancker (The Anchor) in Leuven

Paintings

- Sebastiaen Vrancx, Winter Pastime on the River Scheldt in Antwerp

== Publications ==
- Anna, Countess of Argyle, El alma del incomparable san Augustin sacada del cuerpo de sus confessiones (Antwerp, Gerald Wolschaten)
- Bede, The historie of the Church of England, translated by Thomas Stapleton (Saint-Omer, Charles Boscard for John Heigham)
- Pedro de Bivero, Sermon de honras en las hechas al archiduque Alberto, duque de Borgoña, conde de Flandes (Antwerp, Martinus Nutius)
- Petrus Castellanus, Laudatio funebris Alberti Belgarum principis. Dicta Lovanii in collegio trilingui (Leuven, Hendrik Hastens)
- Christophorus Chamberlinus, Laudatio funebris serenissimi et pientissimi principis Alberti (Douai, widow of Pierre Télu)
- Jean-Jacques Chifflet, Lacrymae prisco ritu fusae in exsequiis Sereniss. Archiducis Alberti Pii, Belgicae Sequaniciq. Principis (Antwerp, Plantin Press)
- Edward Coffin, A true relation of the last sicknes and death of Cardinall Bellarmine. Who dyed in Rome the seaventeenth day of September 1621. And of such things as have happened in, or since his buriall ([Saint-Omer, English College Press])
- Diego de Estella, The contempt of the world, and the vanities therof (third edition, Saint-Omer, [Charles Boscard] for John Heigham)
- Jan Franco, Almanach oft iournael Voor het Jaer (Antwerp, Arnout Coninx)
- Jean-Baptiste Gramaye, Africae illustratae libri decem (Tournai, Adrien Quinqué)
- Adriaan van Meerbeeck, Theatre funebre ou sont representéez les funerailles de plusieurs princes et la vie, trespas, et magnifiques obseques de Albert le Pie de treshaulte memoire archiduc d'Austrice, duc de Bourgoigne, Brabant, etc (Brussels, Ferdinand de Hoeymaecker)
- Adriaan van Meerbeeck, Tonneel der wt-vaerden van Ferdinandus coninck, Carolus keyser, Philippus den tweeden, Rudolphus den tweeden, Philippus den derden, midtsgaders t'leven, ouerlijden ende begravinghe (Brussels, Ferdinand de Hoeymaecker)
- Aubertus Miraeus, De vita Alberti pii, sapientis, prudentis Belgarum principis commentarius (Antwerp, Plantin Press)
- Aubertus Miraeus, Fasti Belgici et Burgundici (Brussels, Jan Pepermans)
- Aubertus Miraeus, Monasterii Viridi Vallis in Sonia silva, prope Bruxellam (Brussels, Jan Pepermans)
- Bernard de Montgaillard, Le soleil eclipsé ou Discours sur la vie et mort du serenissime archiduc Albert (Brussels, Hubert Anthoon)
- Pedro de Ribadeneyra, The life of the holy patriarch S. Ignatius of Loyola, authour, and founder of the Society of Jesus ([Saint-Omer, English College Press])
- Peter Paul Rubens, Palazzi di Genova (anonymously printed)
- Frances de Sales, An introduction to a devoute life (second edition, [Saint-Omer, [Charles Boscard] for John Heigham, [1622])
- Emanuel Sueyro, Descripcion breve del Pais Baxo (Antwerp, Gerard van Wolsschaten)
- Andreas Trevisius and Erycius Puteanus, Phoenix principum: sive Alberti pii morientis vita (Leuven, Hendrik Hastens and Petrus Zangrius)
- Johannes Chrysostomus vander Sterre, Vita Sancti Norberti (Antwerp, Theodoor Galle)
- Richard Verstegan, Scherp-sinnighe characteren. Oft subtijle beschrijvinghe van de proprieteyten oft eyghendommen van verscheyden persoonen (Antwerp, Willem Lesteens)
- Thomas Worthington, An anker of Christian doctrine. Wherein the most principal points of Catholike religion, are proved: by the only written Word of God (Douai, Laurence Kellam)

News prints and pamphlets

- Brieve relation du martyre de cinq persans nouvellement baptisez par les PP. Carmelites Deschaussez, qui demeurent en la Mission de Perse auprès du Roy en sa Ville d'Haspahan (Lille, Pierre de Rache)
- Estat et succez de ce que s’est passé en la guerre du Grand Turc et le Roy de Polongne (Lille, Christophe Beys)
- L'Heureux succes de la memorable victoire emportée par Dom Gonzales de Cordua & Monsieur de Tilly, conducteur des trouppes Imperialles, contre Helberstadt de Brunswick, autrement dict l'evesque Apostat, fauteur des ennemis de l'Empire (Lille, Christophe Beys)

Periodicals

- Nieuwe Tijdinghen (Antwerp, Abraham Verhoeven), ongoing

== Births ==
- 2 July – René-François de Sluse, clergyman-mathematician (died 1685)
- 30 November – Robert van den Hoecke, painter-architect (died 1668)

Date uncertain

- Gaspar de Verlit, composer (died 1682)

== Deaths ==
- 19 February (burial) – Frans Pourbus the Younger (born 1569), painter
- 17 April – Guillaume de Grysperre (born 1543/4), privy councillor
- 20 April – Jaspar d'Ennetières (born c. 1555), poet
- 15 May – Petrus Plancius (born 1552) clergyman-cartographer
- 18 October – Anne de Chantraine (born c. 1603), victim of witchcraft accusations
- 20 October – Cornelius Lancilottus (born c. 1575), Augustinian

Date uncertain

- Jan Jacobsen (born 1588/89), Dunkirker
- Gillis van Valckenborch (born 1570), painter
