= Jean Zuallart =

Belgian explorer

Engraved portrait from Il devotissimo viaggio di Gerusalemme (Rome, 1587)

Jean Zuallart (1541–1634) was an administrator, local magistrate, pilgrim and travel writer from the County of Hainaut in the Habsburg Netherlands. He produced an account of his pilgrimage to Jerusalem which was published with illustrations based on sketches that he had made on the spot.

== Life ==
Zuallart was born at Silly, in 1541, and was educated at the Latin school in Ath. In 1577 he became bailiff of the Trazegnies estate in Irchonwelz, and in 1580 receiver of the count's incomes in Autreppe.

As tutor, he accompanied two sons of Richard de Merode and Marguerite d'Oignies; Charles Philippe de Merode and his brother, on their tour through Germany and Italy, and having arrived in Rome consented to their entreaties to make a pilgrimage to Jerusalem. His account of the pilgrimage to Jerusalem, completed in 1586, was first published in Italian as Il devotissimo viaggio di Gerusalemme.

Returning to the Low Countries, Zuallart became bailiff of Silly (1590–1617) and receiver of rents in Silly and Gondregnies (1601–1623). By 1608, he was also mayor of Ath. In 1609, he assembled the materials from which Jean-Baptiste Gramaye, historiographer royal to the Archdukes, wrote La Description de la Ville d'Ath (Ath, Jean Maes, 1610).

Zuallart died in Ath on 6 March 1634. He was buried in the church of the Sisters of Nazareth in Ath, but his tombstone was later moved to the parish church of Bouvignies.

== Works ==
The two chapels of Golgotha in the Church of the Holy Sepulchre, from Il devotissimo viaggio di Gerusalemme (Rome, 1587)

- Il devotissimo viaggio di Gerusalemme (Rome, Francesco Zanetti and Giacomo Ruffinelli, 1587). Reprinted in Rome by Domenico Basa in 1595.
  - German translation: Deliciae Hierosolomytanae & totius Palastinae, das ist, Bilgerfahrt in das Heilige Land (Cologne, Gerhard Grevenbroich, 1606).
  - French translation: Le Tresdevot Voyage de Jérusalem (Antwerp, Arnout Coninx, 1608). Second edition Antwerp, Willem van Tongeren, 1626.
