= Floris Van der Haer =

Floris Van der Haer, also known as Florentius Haracus, (1547–1634) was a clergyman from the Habsburg Netherlands and an author of historical works.

He was born in Leuven in 1547 to a family from Utrecht. As a clergyman, he was attached first to St. Gertrude's Abbey, Leuven, and later to a canonry in Lille, where he died on 6 February 1634.

== Works ==
- De initiis tumultuum Belgicorum (Douai, Jan Bogard, 1587; reissued Leuven, Judocus Coppens, 1640)
- Antiquitatum liturgicarum arcana (Douai, Balthazar Bellerus, 1605)
- Les chastelains de Lille, leur ancien estat, office et famille (Lille, Christophe Beys, 1611)
