= Jan van der Noot =

Dutch Renaissance writer and poet (1539–1595)

Jonker Jan Baptista van der Noot
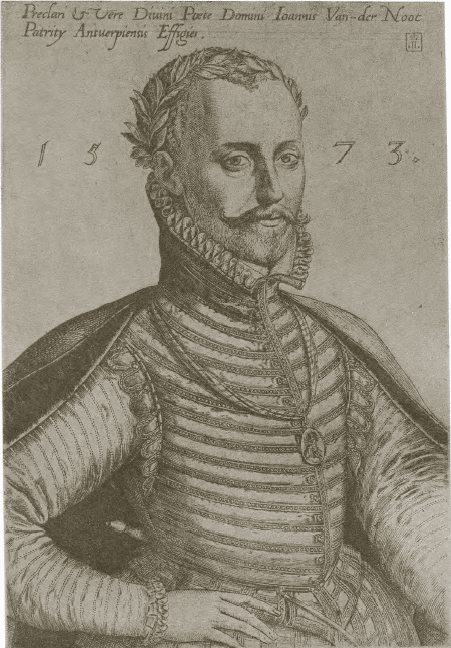
- A portrait of Jan van der Noot engraved by Dirck Volckertszoon Coornhert (1573)
- Born: 1539; Brecht
- Died: 1595 (aged 55–56); Antwerp
- Writing career
- Language: Dutch
- Period: Renaissance
- Genre: verse
- Notable work: De poeticsche werken (multiple volumes 1580–1594)
- Literary movement: La Pléiade

Jonker Jan van der Noot (1539–1595) was a Netherlandish writer who is regarded as the first Renaissance poet to write poetry in Dutch.

== Life ==
Jan van der Noot was born to a noble family in Brecht, in the Duchy of Brabant, about halfway between Antwerp and Breda. In 1558 he moved to Antwerp and at some point became a Calvinist. In 1567, during the early stages of the Dutch Revolt, he was implicated in an attempted coup in Antwerp and fled to England.

His first work was published by John Day in Dutch and French editions in London (1568) as Het theatre oft toon-neel and Le theatre. The following year Edmund Spenser's English translation, A theatre wherein be represented as wel the miseries & calamities that follow the voluptuous worldlings, came out with Henry Bynneman. It was a combined work in verse and prose, reflecting on the deceits and shortcomings of the world.

In 1571 Van der Noot was in Cleves, and in 1572 in Cologne. He eventually returned to Antwerp. Ironically, he was now a Catholic and the city was coming under the rule of Calvinists. In Antwerp he produced a series of volumes of new verse, all with the title De poeticsche werken. He died in 1595.

== Works ==
- Het theatre oft toon-neel: waer in ter eender de ongelucken ende elenden die den werelts gesinden ende boosen menschen toecomen ([London, John Daye], 1568)
  - Le theatre auquel sont exposés et monstrés les inconveniens et miseres qui suivent les mondains et vicieux (London, John Day, 1568)
  - A theatre wherein be represented as wel the miseries & calamities that follow the voluptuous worldlings, translated by Edmund Spenser (London, Henry Bynneman, 1569)
- Het bosken. Inhoudende verscheyden poëtixe wercken (London, Henry Binneman & John Daye, [1570])
- Verscheiden poetixe wercken (Cologne, Gottfried Hirtshorn, 1572)
- Das buch Extasis (Cologne, Felix Röschlin, Heinrich von Aich, 1576)
- Cort begryp der XII boeken Olympiados. Abrege des douze livres Olympiades (Antwerp, Gilles van den Rade, 1579). Available on Google Books. Accessed 9 November 2015.
- Lofsang van Braband. Hymne de Braband (Antwerp, Gilles van den Rade, 1580)
- Verscheyden poetische werken. Divers oeuvres poetiques (Antwerp, Gillis van den Rade, 1580)
- Verscheyden poeticsche werken; divers oeuvres poetiques (Antwerp, Gilles van den Rade, 1581)
- De poetische werken (Antwerp, Gillis van den Rade, 1584)
- De poeticsche werken (Antwerp, Gillis van den Rade, 1585)
- De poeticsche werken (Antwerp, Daniel Vervliet, 1588)
- De poeticsche werken (Antwerp, Daniel Vervliet, 1590)
- De poeticsche werken (Antwerp, Arnout Coninx, 1591). Available on Google Books. Accessed 9 November 2015.
- De poeticsche werken (Antwerp, Arnout Coninx, 1592)
- De poeticsche werken (Antwerp, Arnould Coninx, 1593)
- De poeticsche vverken (Antwerp, Daniel Vervliet, 1593). Available on Google Books. Accessed 9 November 2015.
- De poeticsche werken (Antwerp, Daniel Vervliet, 1594)
- Op de gheluckigheende heerlijke in-koomste Ernesto van Oostenrijck. Sur l'heureuse et magnifique entree du prince Erneste, archeduc d'Austrice (Antwerp, Arnout Coninx, 1594)
