= John Hay (Jesuit) =

Scottish Jesuit scholar and educator (1546-1608)

John Hay (1546–1608), Latinized Joannes Haius or Hayus, was a Scottish Jesuit scholar and educator.

== Career ==
Born to the Hays of Delgatie, he was a relative of Edmund Hay. In 1576 he took part in a disputation against a Protestant theologian in Strasbourg. For some time he was attached to the Collège de Tournon, engaging in controversy with the Huguenots of La Rochelle, in particular Jean de Serres. He later moved to the Low Countries, where he published Latin translations of works from and about Jesuit missions overseas.

Hay wrote a letter to Everard Mercurian, General of the Society of Jesus, describing his visit to Scotland in 1579. He sailed from Bordeaux to Dundee. He went to the royal court at Stirling Castle and mentions that his family was busy with building work at Delgatie Castle.

== Publications ==
- Demandes faictes aux ministres d'Escosse: touchant la religion Chrestienne (1583)
  - German translation as Fragstuck des Christlichen Glaubens, an die nieuwe sectische Predigkanten (1586)
- L'Antimoine aux Responses, que Th. de Beze faict à trente sept demandes de deux cents et six, proposées aux Ministres d'Escosse (1588).

As translator

- Diego de Torres Bollo, De rebus Peruanis (Antwerp, Martinus Nutius, 1604).
- De rebus Japonicis, Indicis et Peruanis epistolae recentiores (Antwerp, Martinus Nutius, 1605).
