= Philippus Nutius (printer) =

Philippus Nutius or Philips Nuyts (1543—1586) was a printer-bookseller in 16th-century Antwerp.

== Life ==
Philippus was the son of the printer Martinus Nutius I (1515—1558) and Marie Borrewater. He was licensed as a printer on 15 September 1564 and took over the family business from his mother, "Widow of Martinus Nutius". When licensed in 1570 under more stringent laws, he declared that he could not himself operate a printing press, but managed the affairs of the printing house and bookshop in the manner he had learned from his father. He knew Latin, French, Spanish, Dutch and Italian, and a little German. In 1574 he was admitted a master of the Guild of St Luke. He was married to Claire Manteaux. From 1579 his younger brother Martinus II was associated with him in the business. Philippus died in 1586 and was buried on 27 March.

== Publications ==
- Den bibel inhoudende het Oudt ende Nieu Testament (1566)
- Angelo Poliziano, Epistolarum libri XII (1567)
- Basil the Great, Omnia quae in hunc diem latino sermone donata sunt opera (1568)
- Marco Girolamo Vida, Opera (1568)
- Nicolaus Biesius, De natura libri V (1573)
- Digestum vetus, seu Pandectarum juris civilis tomus primus (1575) — one volume of an edition of the Pandects
- Joannes Molanus, Indiculus sanctorum Belgii (1583)
