= François-Hyacinthe Choquet =

Hagiographer and spiritual author (ca. 1580–1645)

François-Hyacinthe Choquet (ca. 1580–1645) was a Dominican hagiographer and spiritual author in the Spanish Netherlands.

== Life ==
Choquet was born in Lille, in Walloon Flanders, around 1580. As a young man he was professed as a member of the Dominican Order in Antwerp. Iñigo de Brizuela, the Archduke Albert's Dominican confessor, sent Choquet to the University of Salamanca to study Theology. From 1608 to 1616 he taught at the Dominican house of studies in Louvain. In 1611 he attended the order's general chapter in Paris. On 28 July 1615 he was awarded a doctorate in Theology from the University of Douai. In 1616 he was appointed to the Dominican house of studies in Douai.

He died in Antwerp on 6 February 1645.

== Works ==
- Laudatio virtutis et sapientiæ D. Thomæ Aquinatis (Douai, Balthazar Bellerus, 1618)
- Sancti Belgii ordinis Praedicatorum (Douai, Balthazar Bellerus, 1618)
  - Translated into French by Jean de Nœuwirelle as Actions mémorables des PP. Dominicains qui ont fleuri aux Pays-Bas (Douai, Balthazar Bellerus, 1629)
  - Translated into Dutch by Léonard Janssen-Boy as De heylighen ende salighe in Nederlandt van het Oorden der Predick-heeren (Antwerp, Willem Lesteens, 1644)
- De confessione per literas, seu Internuncium, dissertationes theologicae (Douai, Bellerus, 1623)
- Mariae Deiparae in ordinem praedicatorum viscera materna (Antwerp, Joannes Cnobbaert, 1634)
- Tableau racourcy des vertus héroïques de la très noble et très illustre Dame Saincte Aye (Mons, Jean Havart, 1640)
- Triumphus Rosariii a Sede Apostolica decretus sodalitati B. Virginis Mariae, ob victoria ipsius precibus partam de Potentissima Turcarum classe sub Pio V. Pont.Max (Antwerp, Willem Lesteens, 1641)
