= Joannes Masius =

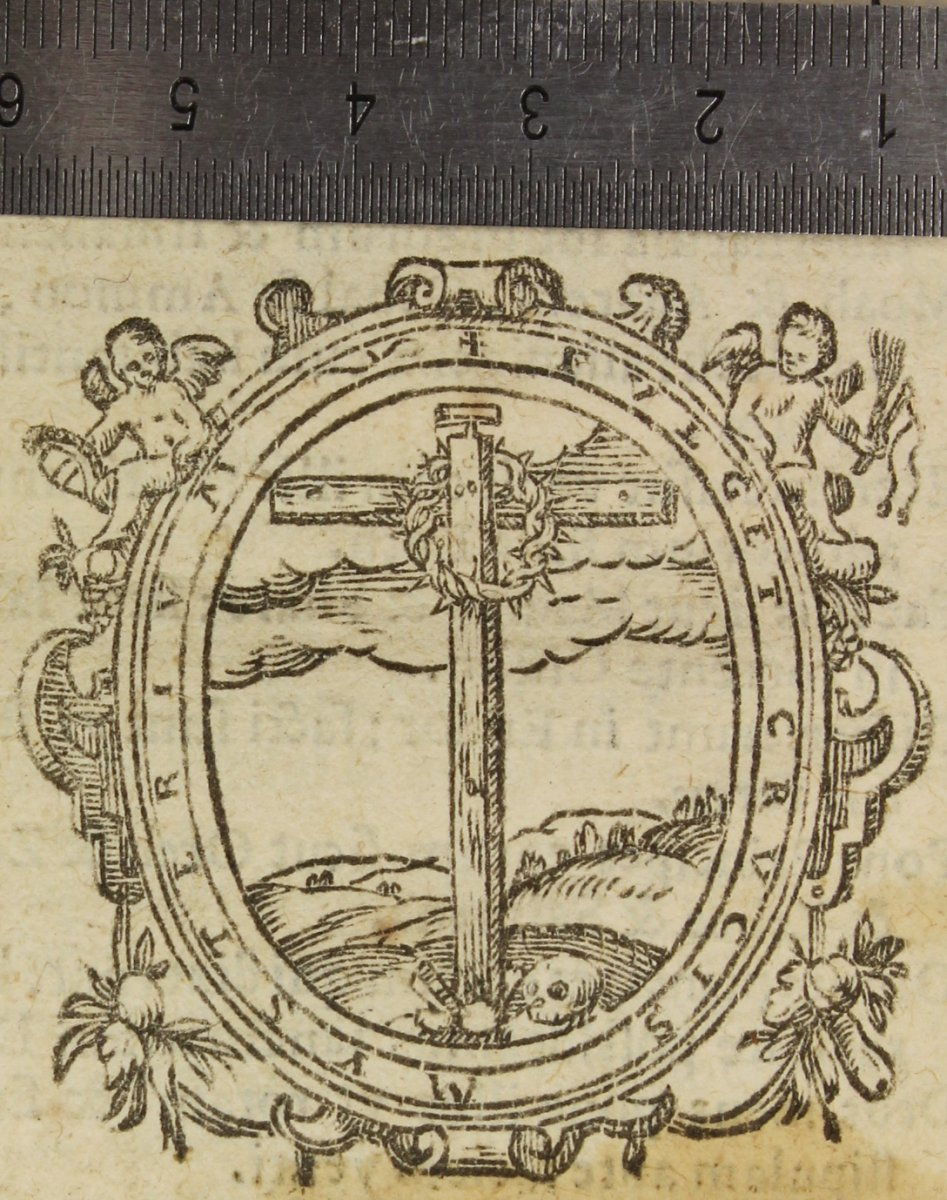
Printer's device of Joannes Masius, found in H. van Cuyck, Litvrgicæ precationes (1605), Universiteit Antwerpen - Bibliotheek Ruusbroecgenootschap RG 3113 H 10 (f. i6 verso)

Jan Maes or Joannes Masius (active 1566–1615) was a printer and bookseller in the university town of Leuven in the Habsburg Netherlands.

== Career ==
Masius, a native of Leuven, moved to Antwerp to work for Christopher Plantin at the Plantin Press in 1566. He left Plantin in 1567 and in 1570 he was licensed as a printer in the city of Leuven. One of his sons, Joannes Masius the Younger, became a printer-bookseller in Ath; another, Bernard or Bernardin, took over his business in Leuven in 1616.

== Publications ==
- 1576: Antoon van Tsestich, Orthographia Linguae Belgicae, sive de recta dictionum Teutonicarum scriptura, secundum Belgarum, praesertim Brabantorum, pronuntiandi usitatam rationem (Available on Google Books)
- 1585: Alessandro Valignano, Historia Decem Martyrum Salsetanorum – an account of the Martyrs of Cuncolim (Available on Google Books)
- 1586: Jacobus Jansenius, In sacrum Missae Canonem (Available on Google Books)
- 1591: Adrianus Romanus, Ouranographia sive caeli descriptio (Available on Google Books)
- 1595: Joannes Molanus, Natales sanctorum Belgii et eorundem chronica recapitulatio, with Philippus Zangrius
- 1596: Jacobus Jansenius, In Canticum Canticorum Salomonis Commentarius, with Philippus Zangrius (Available on Google Books)
- 1597: Jacobus Jansenius, In Psalterium, et Cantica, quibus per horas Canonicas Romana utitur Ecclesia expositio, with Philippus Zangrius (Available on Google Books)
- 1598: anonymous, Aen Hollandt (Available on Google Books)
- 1600: Hendrik van Cuyk, Ad Mauritium Comitem Nassavium Secunda Paraenetica epistola (Available on Google Books)
- 1604: Jacobus Jansenius, Liturgica, sive de sacrificiis materiati altaris, libri quatuor (Available on Google Books)
- 1606: Adrianus Romanus, Speculum Astronomicum sive Organum Forma Mappae Expressum (Available on Google Books)
- 1607: Jean-Baptiste Gramaye, Historia Brabantica (Available on Google Books)
- 1615: Joannes Baptista Wils (pen name of Francis Wichmans), Epigrammata de viris sanctimonia illustribus ex Ordine Praemonstratensi
