= Blas de Prado =

Spanish painter

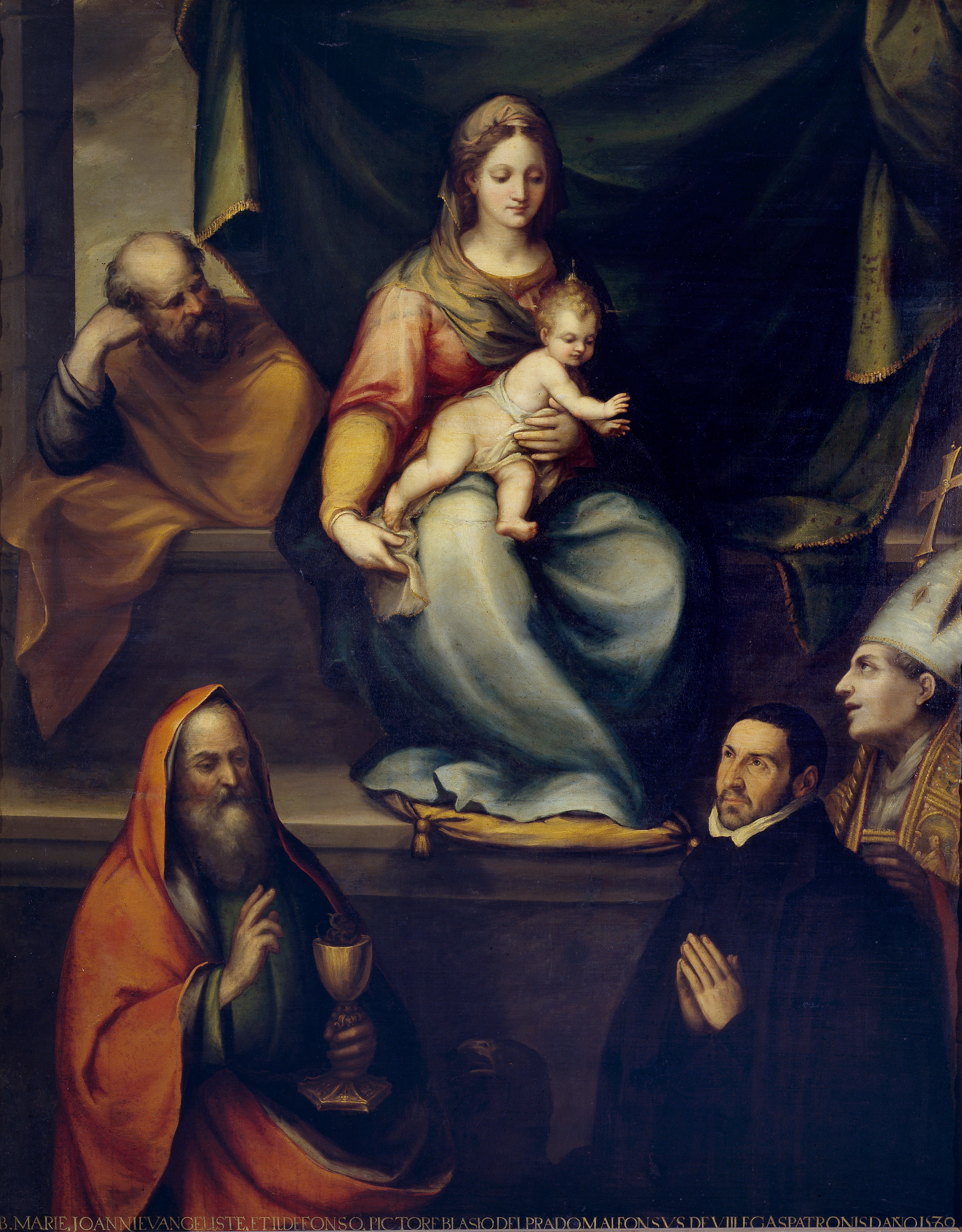
Holy Family with Ildephonsus of Toledo, John the Baptist, and master Alonso de Villegas, painted in 1589, now at the Museo del Prado in Madrid

Blas de Prado, or Del Prado, was a Spanish painter, who was born in the vicinity of Toledo, about 1540, and was a scholar of Alonso Berruguete. There are some of his works in the chapel of St. Blas at Toledo, but they are much injured by time and the dampness of the situation. At Madrid there are also some pictures by this artist, particularly an altar-piece in the church of San Pedro, representing the 'Descent from the Cross,' which is evidently the work of a great master. In the early part of his life Prado was invited to visit the court of the Emperor of Morocco, to paint a portrait of his daughter, and returned to Spain amply rewarded for his labour. Whilst at Fez he painted the portraits of the Princesses of the Harem. He died at Madrid about 1600.
