= Leon De Meyere =

Poet

- Died: 28 December 1630
- Education: licentiate in laws (civil and canon)
- Occupation: clergy
- Writing career
- Language: French and Latin
- Years active: 1594–1613
- Genre: panegyric
- Subjects: political verse, Marian devotion
- Notable work: Poëme. Advis pour la paix de Belgique (1598).

Leon De Meyere (died 28 December 1630) was a poet from Antwerp about whom very little is known.

== Life and writing ==
His earliest known work, which identifies him as a licentiate of laws, was a poem in French celebrating the reception of Archduke Ernest of Austria as governor general of the Habsburg Netherlands in 1594, Prosopopée d'Anvers à la bienvenue du Sérénissime prince Ernest. On 12 July he was awarded 13 florins 20 stivers in thanks. Four years later, at the reception of Albert and Isabella as rulers of the Habsburg Netherlands, he brought out Poëme. Advis pour la paix de Belgique (1598), a policy paper in verse. This was a controversial piece that elicited an unfavourable Responce au Poeme d'advis pour la paix Belgique (1598).

In 1599 De Meyere was appointed provost of the church of St Pharaildis in Ghent. During his time in Ghent he became friendly with local poet Maximiliaan de Vriendt and published two Latin orations on Marian themes, one for the Feast of the Annunciation and one for the Assumption. In 1615 he transferred to the collegiate church in Harelbeke, where he remained until his death.

== Works ==
- Prosopopée d'Anvers à la bienvenue du Sérénissime prince Ernest (Antwerp, Arnout Coninx, 1594).
- Poëme. Advis pour la paix de Belgique (Antwerp, Arnout Coninx, 1598).
- Funus Guilielmi Assonlevillii (Antwerp, Plantin office, 1599).
- Panegyris Mariana, in festo Annunciationis (Antwerp, Plantin office, 1602).
- Panegyricus Mariae virgini triumphanti, die assumptioni sacro (Antwerp, Hieronymus Verdussen, 1613).
