= Jacobus Jansenius =

Dutch theologian (1547–1625)

Jacobus Jansenius, alternatively Jansonius or Janssoon (1547–1625) was a Dutch theologian who served as rector of Leuven University.

== Life ==
Jansenius was born in Amsterdam in early September 1547. He studied Philosophy and Theology at the University of Leuven, graduating Licentiate of Sacred Theology in May 1575. In 1580 he became an ordinary professor of Theology and a canon of St. Peter's Church, Leuven. In 1589 he was appointed president of Pope's College and rector of the university. On 29 November 1598 he succeeded Thomas Stapleton as Regius Professor of Sacred Scripture. On 17 October 1614 he became dean of St Peter's.

Jansenius died on 30 July 1625 and was buried in Pope's College chapel.

== Works ==
- Catholici Ecclesiastae instructio (Leuven, 1585)
  - Reissued from the same press, 1594.
- In sacrum Missae Canonem (Leuven, Joannes Masius, 1586)
- Oratio funebris in obitum eximii D. Henrici Gravii (Leuven, 1591)
- In Canticum Canticorum Salomonis Commentarius (Leuven, Joannes Masius and Philip Zangrius, 1596)
- In Psalterium, et Cantica, quibus per horas Canonicas Romana utitur Ecclesia expositio (Leuven, Joannes Masius and Philip Zangrius 1597)
- Vitta coccinea, sive enarratio Dominicae Passionis, ex verbis utriusque Testamenti, aliisque contexta (Leuven, 1600)
- Liturgica, sive de sacrificiis materiati altaris, libri quatuor (Leuven, Joannes Masius 1604)
- t'Proces van Melchisedech, bij aenspraecke, antwoorde, replycke, ende duplycke, gheinstrueert, ghefurnieurt, ende in staet ghestelt (Leuven, Gerard Rivius, 1618)
- Oratio funebris in obitum D. Matthiae Hovii (Leuven, Gerard Rivius, 1620)
- In Propheticum librum Job enarratio (Leuven, Hendrik Hastens and Petrus Zangrius, 1623)
- Offencium decem Evangelicarum virtutum, seu beneplacitorum B. Mariae, ad formam Romani Breviarii accommodatum (Antwerp, 1626)
- In Evangelium S. Joannis expositio (Leuven, 1630)
