= Antoon van Tsestich =

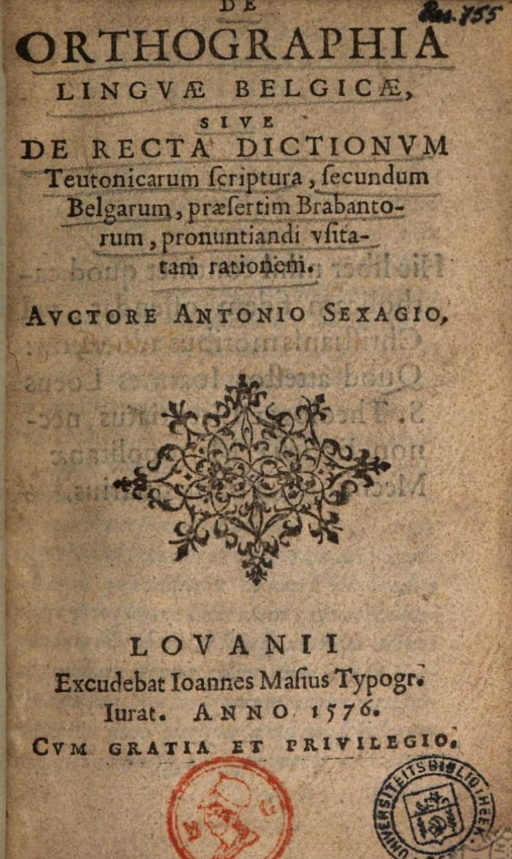
De orthographia linguae Belgicae (Lovanii, 1576).

Antoon van Tsestich, Latinized Antonius Sexagius (died 1585) was a lawyer and author in the 16th-century Low Countries.

== Life ==
Tsestich was an advocate in the Great Council of Mechelen, the highest law court in the Habsburg Netherlands. He died in Mechelen on 10 September 1585.

== Works ==
Tsestich wrote a work on Dutch orthography, Orthographia Linguae Belgicae, sive de recta dictionum Teutonicarum scriptura, secundum Belgarum, praesertim Brabantorum, pronuntiandi usitatam rationem (Leuven, Joannes Masius, 1576), and edited Filips Wielant's work on civil litigation, Pracktijke Civile des edelen heere M. Phylips Wielant (Antwerp, Hendrick vander Loe, 1573). The latter was reprinted in Rotterdam in 1613.
