= Philippus Nutius =

Belgian Jesuit

Philippus Nutius or Nuyts (1597—1661) was a 17th-century Flemish Jesuit.

== Life ==
Nutius was born in Antwerp on 8 March 1597, the son of the bookseller Martinus Nutius II and Anna Templaers. He entered the Society of Jesus in 1613, as did his friend and contemporary Jean-Charles della Faille, and went on to teach mathematics at Jesuit colleges in Prague and Madrid. Returning to the Low Countries, he undertook further study in theology and the scriptures and became chaplain to the governor of Antwerp Citadel. In the 1630s he engaged in controversy with the Dutch Reformed preacher Jacobus Trigland. In 1652, he travelled to Stockholm in an attempt to convert Christina, Queen of Sweden, to Catholicism. He died in Mechelen on 17 April 1661.
