= Jesuit College, Messina =

Former Jesuit College in Messina, Italy

Coordinates: 38°11′22.2″N 15°33′08.2″E

Jesuit College
- Italian: Collegio dei gesuiti
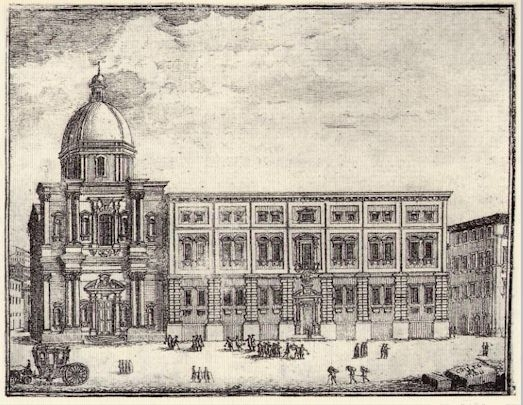
- An etching of the former Jesuit College, Messina
- Type: Destroyed college
- Active: c. 1548–1908
- Founders: Society of Jesus
- Religious affiliation: Catholicism (Jesuits)
- Location: Messina, Sicily, Italy

Jesuit College, Messina (Italian: Collegio dei gesuiti), with the adjacent church of San Giovanni Battista of the Society of Jesus had been an important building complex in the city of Messina, Sicily, Italy. It was destroyed by the 1908 earthquake.

== Jesuit College ==
The Jesuits were present in the city since 1548, in charge of Saint Nicholas Church. At the insistence of Juan de Vega, Viceroy of Sicily, Ignatius of Loyola agreed to open a college there, the very first college founded by the Jesuits and for this reason known as "Primum ac Prototypum Collegium". Since this gave new direction to the apostolic options of the Society of Jesus, Ignatius added solemnity to its founding, requesting the Pope's blessing for the opening team of ten Jesuits which included one of his earliest companions Jerome Nadal. Early Jesuit library inventories provide an idea of topics studied.

An earthquake in 1908 left the buildings so damaged that they were demolished in 1913. Only the entrance portal with four columns was kept as part of the complex of buildings of the new University of Messina, built on the site of the former college.

== See also ==
- Higher education in Italy
- List of Jesuit sites
