= John Heigham =

English Roman Catholic printer, writer and translator

John Heigham (c. 1568 – after 1634) was an English Catholic printer, writer, and translator who mostly worked in exile at Douai and later Saint-Omer in the Spanish Netherlands. He has been described as "the most productive English Catholic publisher of the early seventeenth century after the English College press".

== Life ==
In 1628 Heigham gave his age as "about 60", which would put his birth around 1568. There are indications that he was involved in clandestine Catholic printing and book-smuggling in England in the 1590s. In 1603 he left England for good and for a few years went by the name Roger Heigham, perhaps as an alias. While living in Douai (1603–1609), he married Marie Boniface from Arras, with whom he had at least eight children, seven of whom were baptized in Saint-Omer.

Heigham worked as a publisher and bookseller, commissioning printing from local presses in Douai and Saint-Omer, particularly from Pierre Auroi and from Charles Boscard and his widow. The penal laws meant that his books had to be smuggled across the Channel, and in 1609 he and his wife were arrested in England with a consignment. He seems to still have been alive in 1634, when one of his sons entered the English College, Rome, but there is no later evidence of his activity, and no record of his death.

== Publications ==
His works are now thought to include at least one book published under the name of Matthew Kellison, The Gagge of the Reformed Gospell, from 1623. This was intended as a divisive work aimed at English Protestants, setting the decrees of the Synod of Dort against texts from the King James Bible.

Other works were:

- A Devout Exposition of the Holie Masse. With an Ample Declaration of all the Rites and Ceremonies belonging to the same, Douai, 1614; St. Omer, 1622; and again London, 1876, edited by Austin Joseph Rowley.
- A Mirrour to Confesse well for such persons as doe frequent this Sacrament. Abridged out of sundrie confessionals by a certain devout Religious man, Douai, 1618 and 1624.
- A Method of Meditation, translated from the French of Father Ignatius Balsom, St. Omer, 1618.
- Bede, The historie of the Church of England, translated by Thomas Stapleton, Saint-Omer, 1622; reprinted 1626
- The Psalter of Jesus, contayninge very devoute and godlie petitions, Douai, 1618. This is a revised edition of Richard Whytford's Psalter. It was reprinted, Douai, 1624, with ‘A Mirrour to Confesse well’ and the four following works, in all six parts, each having a distinct title-page.
- Certaine very pious and godly considerations proper to be exercised whilst the … Sacrifice of the Masse is celebrated, Douai, 1624.
- Divers Devout considerations for the more worthy receaving of the … Sacrament, Douai, 1624.
- Certaine advertisements teaching men how to lead a Christian life, Douai, 1624, translated from the Italian of Charles Borromeo.
- A briefe and profitable exercise of the seaven principall effusions of the … blood of … Jesus Christ, a translation from the French, Douai, 1624.
- Meditations on the Mysteries of our holie Faith, with the Practise of Mental Prayer touching the same, from the Spanish of Luis de la Puente, St. Omer, 1619; reprinted, in a revised and corrected form, London, 1852. This translation is distinct from that of Richard Gibbons in 1610.
- Philippe d'Outreman, The True Christian Catholique; or the Maner How to Live Christianly, St. Omer, 1622.
- Alonso de Villegas, Villegas's Lives of the Saints translated, whereunto are added the Lives of sundry other Saints of the Universal Church, set forth by J. Heigham, St. Omer, 1630. The Flos Sanctorum of Villegas went to a number of editions in English translation by Edward and William Kinsman, this one being edited by Heigham.
- Via Vere Tuta; or the Truly Safe Way. Discovering the Danger, Crookedness, and Uncertaintie of M. John Preston and Sir Humfrey Lindes Unsafe Way, St. Omer, 1631 and 1639. In answer to Sir Humphrey Lynde's Via Tuta.
