= San Marcos, Toledo =

Coordinates: 39.8568°N 4.0257°W

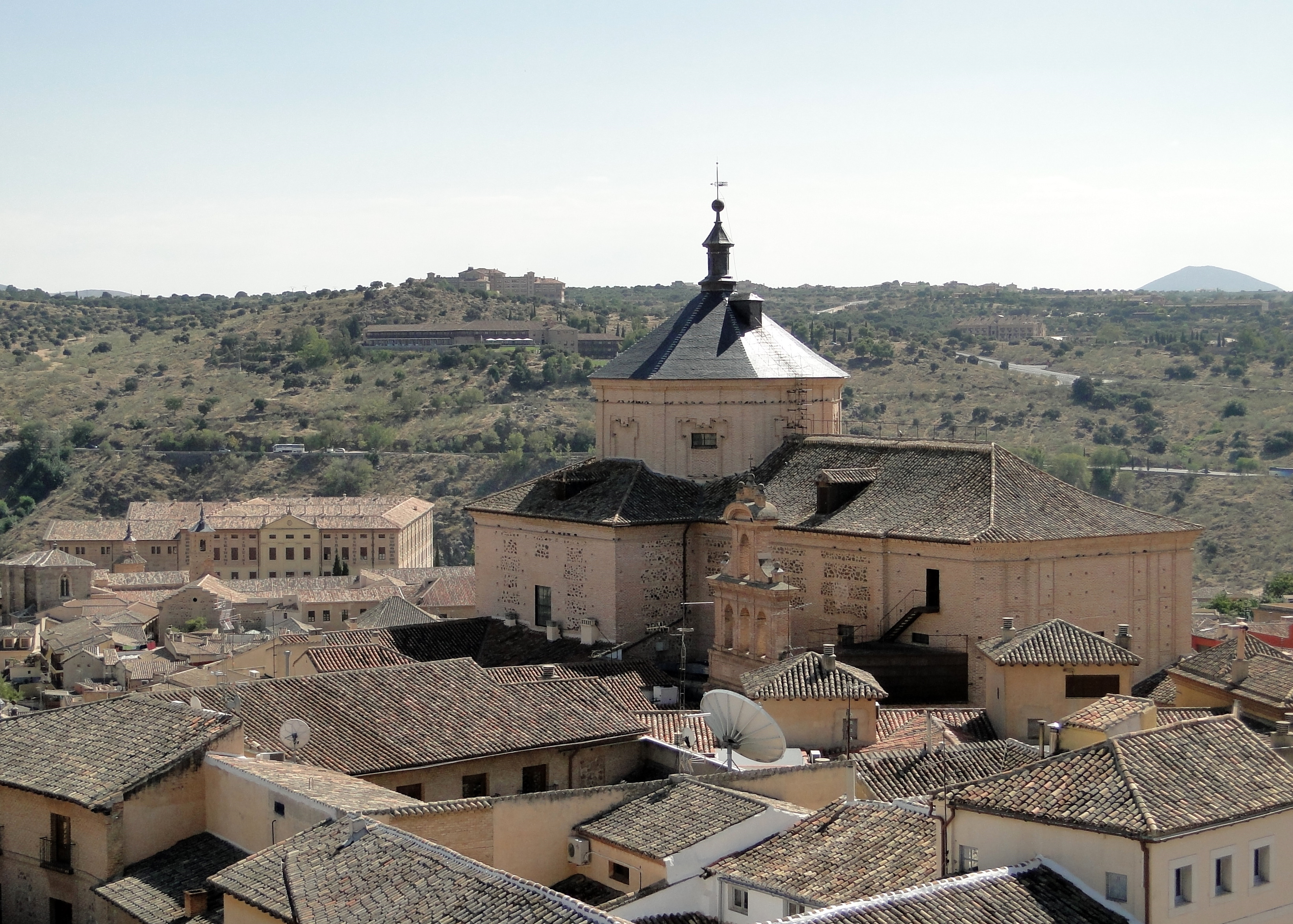

The church of San Marcos in Toledo (Castile-La Mancha, Spain) is a Mozarabic parish church, was formerly the church of a convent of the Trinitarios Calzados order. It was rebuilt in the 17th century.

It is in Spanish Baroque style in its interior and Toledan Mudéjar to the outside.

The works began in 1628, according to traces of Jorge Manuel Theotocópuli, at that time, the cathedral, the Alcázar and the City Hall of Toledo's main master. There is a portico or antechamber outside the church itself, at the foot of the gospel wall, with the only access from the outside and the belfry. This last, all in brick, is a work of 1622, designed and executed by Francisco de Espinosa, master of works and municipal alarife. The aforementioned access, from the outside, is carried out through a portal-altarpiece in stone, made around 1620.

It has a Neoclassical main stone portal, from which the figurative sculpture is lost, with a Mudéjar bulrush like the rest of the church. It also has a simple Chapel of the Virgin Mary.

In the late 20th century it was modified and extended by the architect Ignacio Mendaro Corsini to house the Toledo Municipal Archive and the Arts Centre of San Marcos, opening up the remains of the old convent.

== San Marcos Arts Centre ==
It is now the headquarters of the Historic Interpretation Centre of Toledo and the Municipal Archive of the city. The centre also has an exhibition gallery and auditorium for events.
