= Arnout Coninx =

- Born: 1548
- Died: 1617 (aged 68–69)
- Occupation: printer
- Years active: 1579–1617
- Era: handpress
- Notable work: De CL Psalmen Davids, in dichte ghestelt door Willem van Haecht (1579); De poeticsche werken van myn heer vander Noot (1591)
- Criminal charges: Unlicensed printing (1586); selling forbidden books (1591)

Arnout Coninx (1548–1617) was a printer and bookseller in the city of Antwerp from 1579 until his death in 1617. In 1586 he was fined for unlicensed printing, and in 1591 he was investigated for selling forbidden books. When the city of Antwerp had been reconquered for Philip II of Spain in 1585, Protestants had been given four years to settle their affairs and leave or be reconciled to the Catholic Church. Coninx waited until 1590, after the deadline had passed, to register his conversion to Catholicism.

== Publications ==
- 1584: Desiderius Erasmus, Moriae encomion dat is eenen loff der sotheyt.
- 1586: Marcus Aurelius, T'Gulde-boec van den loflijken keyser ende welsprekenden oratoor Marcus Aurelius.
- 1591: Jan van der Noot, De poeticsche werken van myn heer vander Noot.
- 1594: Leon De Meyere, Prosopopée d'Anvers à la bienvenue du Sérénissime prince Ernest par la grâce de Dieu archiduc d'Autriche, etc., lieutenant gouverneur et capitaine général des Pays-Bas
- 1601: Antonio Ortiz, A relation of the solemnetie wherewith the Catholike princes K. Phillip the III. and Quene Margaret were receyued in the Inglish Colledge of Valladolid the 22. of August, 1600, tr. Francis Rivers
- 1606: Philip Numan, Miracles lately wrought by the intercession of the Glorious Virgin Mary at Mont-aigu, nere unto Sichen in Brabant, translated by Robert Chambers
- 1608: Jean Zuallart, Le très dévot voyage de Jérusalem.
- 1615: Jan Franco, Ephemeris metheorologica. Seer schoone declaratie vande revolutien ende inclinatien van desen [...] jaere ons Heeren. M.D.C.XV.
