= Jerome Nadal =

Spanish catholic priest

The Reverend Jérôme Nadal SJ
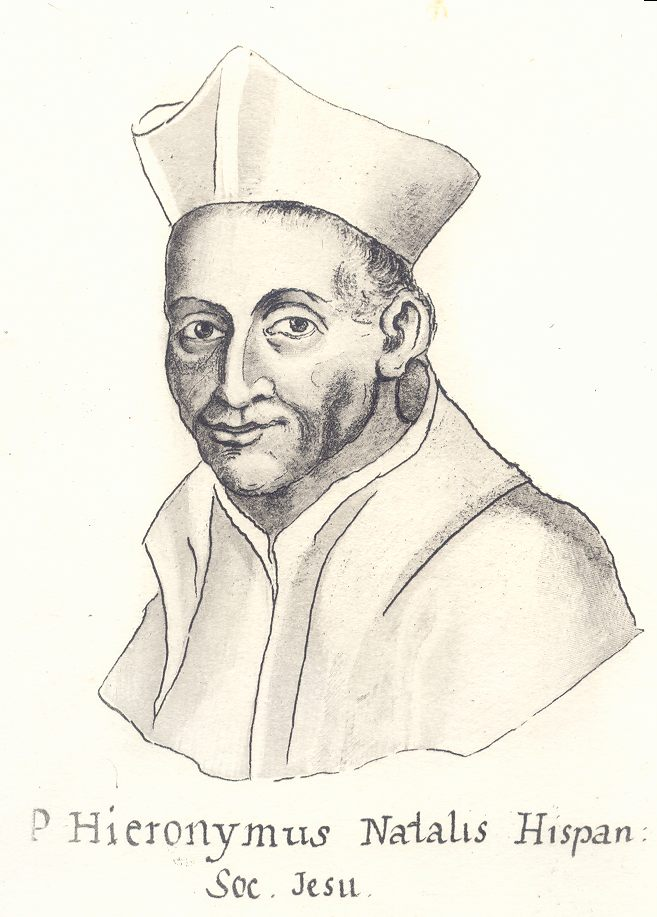
- Born: 11 August 1507; Palma De Mallorca, Balearic Islands, Spain
- Died: 3 April 1580 (aged 72); Rome
- Occupations: Jesuit priest, spiritual theologian
- Known for: Impact on Jesuit Constitutions

Jérôme Nadal, SJ (in Spanish: Jerónimo Nadal) was a Spanish Jesuit priest in the first generation of the companions of St. Ignatius of Loyola. A co-founder of the Jesuits, he was sent to explain to the various Jesuit communities of Europe the first draft of the order's Constitutions. He is known as the "Ignatian theologian" for having developed the theology behind Ignatian spirituality.

== Elements of biography ==
Born in Palma de Mallorca, in the Balearic Islands, on 11 August 1507, Jerome was the eldest of the four children of Antonio Nadal, a lawyer, and Maria Morey. Nadal studied at the University of Alcalá de Henares (1526), where he met Ignatius of Loyola for the first time. He kept his distance from Ignatius at this point since Ignatius was in trouble with the Inquisition.

In autumn 1532 Nadal went to the University of Paris to continue his studies. He felt attracted to the priesthood and, while studying mathematics, began to study theology. In the Latin Quarter he ran across Ignatius and his group of "friends in the Lord", including Peter Faber, Francis Xavier, and Diego Laynez. But he stubbornly refused to join these "alumbrados", whom he mistrusted. He preferred, he said, the Gospel to their "Spiritual Exercises", fearing "to be dragged out of orthodoxy".

Like other Spaniards, he had to leave Paris for political reasons in 1536, and continued his training at the University of Avignon (then an enclave of the Papal States). There he gained a remarkable mastery of Hebrew, to the admiration of the Jewish community of the "City of the Popes". He was offered the position of spiritual director and chief rabbi of Avignon, which he refused.

In April 1536 he was ordained a priest by the auxiliary bishop of Avignon, Simon de Podio, and on 11 May he was awarded a doctorate in theology.

Returning to his native island and setting himself up for a comfortable ecclesiastical career, he awoke from a "deep sleep" by reading a copy of the famous letter sent from India by St. Francis Xavier to the clerics of Paris, apostrophising those who, "at the University of Paris, have more knowledge than a willingness to prepare themselves to draw fruit from it". He became unsettled. He inquired and discovered: "Ignatius is superior general! Xavier is in India! A religious order, the 'Society of Jesus', is approved! What amazing developments! I will immediately go to Rome to meet Ignatius and find out what happened."

He went to Rome and at the age of thirty-eight entered the Society of Jesus. Ignatius quickly noticed his gifts and made him a trusted associate, a "contemplative in action", as Nadal would describe the Ignatian ideal.

He was entrusted the important task of founding the Jesuit College, Messina, the first college opened by the Jesuits, in 1548.

He proceeded to travel and explain the newly formulated Constitutions of the Society of Jesus to the Jesuits in Italy, Spain, and Portugal. He reported to Ignatius the reactions, which were incorporated into the final draft of the Constitutions.

In 1554 Ignatius, two years before his death, appointed Nadal Vicar General of the Society. At the General Congregation of 1558, which elected Diego Laynez as Ignatius' successor, as well as later, he was often consulted as being the one who, having been a very close collaborator with the Society's founder, best expressed his thoughts.

Jerome Nadal died on 3 April 1580 at the San Andrea del Quirinale novitiate in Rome.

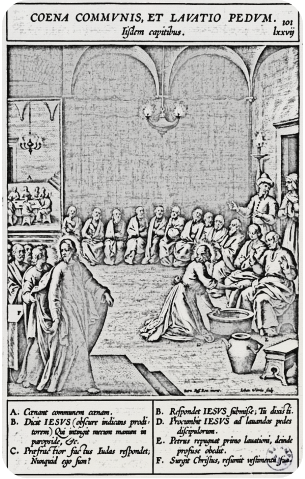

== Evangelical images ==
The Spiritual Exercises of Ignatius of Loyola employ what Ignatius calls the "application of the senses" to the scenes in the Gospels as a higher form of prayer. By contemplating these scenes, along with Jesus' words and actions, one is able to take on the values of Jesus in one's own life. Shortly before Ignatius' death, he asked Nadal to oversee the project of producing engravings to facilitate these "contemplations" of Jesus in the Gospels. These were meant especially to assist Jesuit novices, as a thirty-day retreat using the Spiritual Exercises was a part of every Jesuit's novitiate.

Nadal commissioned several artists to do the engravings, 153 in all, and himself wrote extended captions which included references to parts of the scenes. The engravings, Evangelicae Historiae Imagines, were published in Antwerp in 1593, thirteen years after Nadal's death. This is the oldest collection of such engravings that are extant; they use the art of perspective, which was new at the time.

== See also ==
- Ignatius of Loyola
- Society of Jesus
