= Gerlac Peterson =

Dutch mystic

Gerlac Peterssen (known as Gerlacus Petri) (1377 or 1378 in Deventer – 18 November 1411) was a Dutch mystic.

== Life ==
He entered the Institution of the Brethren of Common Life and devoted his time to calligraphy, transcription of manuscripts, education, and prayer. He became connected with many illustrious contemplative men, e.g., John of Ruysbroeck, Florence Radewyns, Henry of Kalkar, Gerard of Zutphen, Thomas à Kempis, John a Kempis and Johann Vos of Huesden.

When Radewyns founded a monastery of regular canons at Windesheim, in 1386, Gerlac followed him, and remained there until 1403. As a simple clerk; he had no other employment than that of a sexton. Gerlac left his brethren to come back to his cell, where, as he said, "somebody was waiting for him".

== Works ==
Peterson's works include:

- Breviloquium de accidentiis exterioribus (before 1403)
- De libertate spiritus
- Soliloquium cum Deo ignitum (Cologne, 1616; Flemish translation, 1623; French, 1667; Italian 1674; Spanish, 1686)

He has been called another Kempis, and several critics have ascribed to Kempis words or theories which belong to Gerlac. It has been maintained that The Imitation of Christ by Thomas à Kempis reproduced several ideas and the general spirit of Gerlac's ascetic works. In fact, Kempis inserted into the work, which he wrote in 1441, the passage of the Soliloquies where Gerlac says that he would feel no pain, if necessary for the greater glory of God, to be in hell for ever. This passage is an interpolation, which was soon deleted from the Imitation. The difference between the ascetic theories of Gerlac and those of the author of the Imitation are numerous and deep enough to make any similarities apparent.
