= Antoine de Balinghem =

Antoine de Balinghem (1571–1630) was a Belgian Jesuit. He was born at Saint-Omer in 1571 and died in Lille on 24 January 1630.
