= St Gertrude's Abbey, Leuven =

Former Belgian school & student residence

St Gertrude's Abbey
- Sint-Geertruiabdij
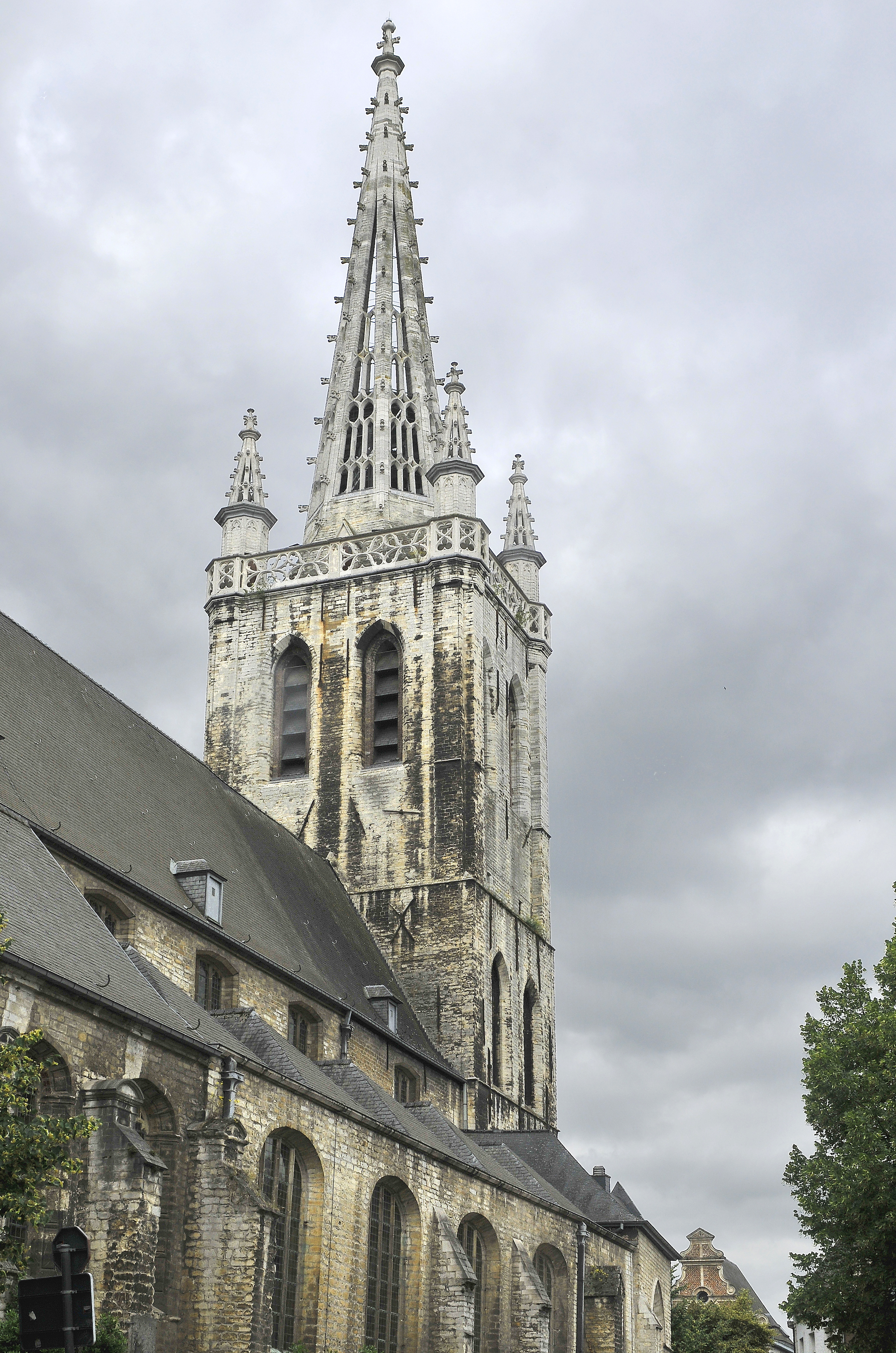
- Interactive map of St Gertrude's Abbey

Monastery information
- Order: Augustinian; Benedictine
- Established: 1206
- Disestablished: 1797
- Diocese: Mechelen-Brussels

Architecture
- Functional status: residential properties
- Heritage designation: listed built heritage

Site
- Coordinates: 50.8838°N 4.6993°E

St Gertrude's Abbey is a complex of former monastic buildings in Leuven, Belgium. An Augustinian priory founded in 1206 was suppressed in 1797. After restoration, the monastic buildings were used between 1917 and 1968 by Benedictine nuns as a house of studies and student residence.

== History ==
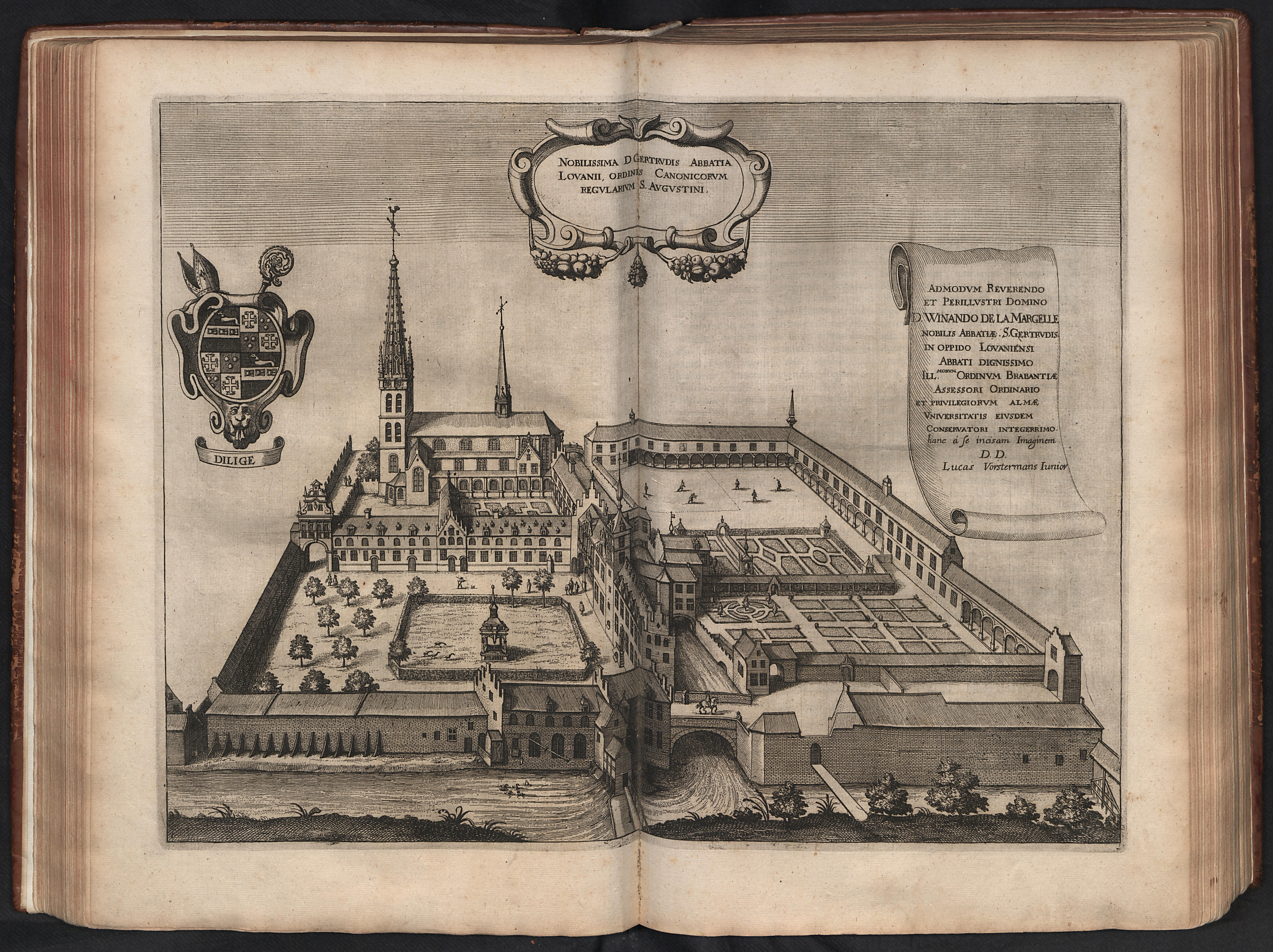
A view of St Gertrude's from Antonius Sanderus, Chorographia Sacra Brabantiae (1659)

In 1206 Henry I, Duke of Brabant, founded a priory of Augustinian Canons Regular. In 1252 the priory church was given the dual function of a parish church. John I, Duke of Brabant, extended the priory's possessions in 1298.

The priory became an abbey in 1449. Building works were carried out under Theodore Van Brakel (abbot 1465-1486), Jan Van Der Moere (abbot 1486-1514), Philippe de Hosdin (abbot 1553-1569), and Arnould Eynthouts (abbot 1593-1607).

The abbey was suppressed in 1797 and the land was divided into three lots and sold at public auction in 1798. In 1911 the property, which had been converted to industrial purposes, was bought by Canon Armand Thiéry and extensively renovated, with the aid of Joseph François Piscador, to house a museum of medieval architecture.

In 1917 the buildings were acquired by the Benedictine nuns of Paix-Notre-Dame Abbey, Liège, who installed a house of studies and a student residence. The buildings were heavily damaged during the bombing of Leuven on 11–12 May 1944, leading to fresh renovations in 1945–1953. The Benedictines left the site after the 1968 linguistic division of the Catholic University of Leuven. The abbey site was bought by the city of Leuven in 1978 and converted into residential property.
