= Balthazar Bellerus =

Balthasar or Balthazar Bellerus or Bellère (active 1589–1634) was a printer first at Antwerp and later at Douai in the Habsburg Netherlands. He was a son of the reputable Antwerp printer Joannes Bellerus, and set up a printing shop of his own in the Rue des Ecoles in Douai in 1590, becoming a colleague and rival to Jan Bogard. The motto that appeared on his printer's mark was Labore ac perseverantiâ (Work and perseverance). His marks were the golden compass and a unicorn dipping its horn in a stream.

On 15 November 1638, Balthasar Moretus wrote to Bellerus asking him to provide an apprenticeship for Martin Nutius, oldest son of the recently deceased Antwerp printer Martinus Nutius III. On 23 November Bellerus declined, predicting that there would be no future for the boy in Antwerp's shrinking book trade.

== Works ==
- 1596: Pedro de Ribadeneira, La vie du père François de Borja, translated by Michel d'Esne
- 1597
  - Nicolas de Montmorency, Manuale principes
  - Iacobus de Vitriaco, Libri duo quorum prior orientalis, sive Hierosolymitanae: alter occidentalis historiae nomine inscribitur
- 1605: Floris Van der Haer, Antiquitatum liturgicarum arcana, 2 volumes
- 1608:
  - John Brugman, La vie de la très Saincte et vrayment admirable vierge Ludyvine, translated by Michel d'Esne
  - Georges Maigret, Petit ray ou atome de la splendeur monastique, Auquel est exhibé l’eschantillon des grands fruicts que recueillent les fidels par la bienvenuë & ioyeuse entree des bons Religieux dans leurs Villes
- 1612: Philibert Monet, Delectus latinitatis
- 1614: Guilielmus Estius, In Omnes Divi Pauli Apostoli Epistolas Commentariorum Tomus Prior
- 1617: Biblia Sacra in six volumes with the Glossa Ordinaria and the postils of Nicholas of Lyra
- 1618: François-Hyacinthe Choquet, Sancti Belgii ordinis Praedicatorum
- 1623: François-Hyacinthe Choquet, De confessione per literas, seu Internuncium, dissertationes theologicae
- 1624: Vincentius Bellovacensis, Speculum naturale, in 4 volumes
- 1629: François-Hyacinthe Choquet, Recueil des vies et actions mémorables des saints personnages ayants vescu dans les Pays-Bas soubs la règle de S. Dominique, translated by Jean de Noeuwirelle
