= Martinus Nutius =

Martinus Nutius or Martin Nuyts was the name of three successive printer-booksellers in 16th and 17th-century Antwerp. Collectively, they were active from 1540 to 1638.

== Martinus Nutius I ==
Martinus Nutius Meranus
- Born: 1515; Meer, Antwerp
- Died: 1558 (aged 42–43)
- Children: Martinus Nutius II; Philippus Nutius

Martinus Nutius Meranus (1515—1558) was born at Meer, near Hoogstraten, and sometimes went by the name Vermeere ("of Meer"). He became a burgher of Antwerp on 31 December 1544, having been a member of Antwerp's Guild of St Luke since 1540. In 1541 his address was In Sint Jacob, naest die Gulden panne, op die pleijne van de Iseren waghe. In 1543 he was buyten die Camerpoorte in den Gulden Eenhoren, in 1544, at the sign of the Fox, and from 1546, in de twee Oeyvaerts (the two storks) on the Corte Camerstraet. His printer's mark became two storks, one carrying a fish or an eel to the other (a needle replaced the fish or eel from 1552). His motto was Pietas homini tutissima virtus (Piety is the most secure virtue for men).

Nutius's output as a printer included an unusual number of works in Spanish. He was married to Marie Borrewater, who ran the family business as "Widow of Martinus Nutius" from 1558 to 1564, when their son Philippus Nutius took over the shop.

=== Publications ===
- Juan Boscán Almogáver and Garcilaso de la Vega, Las Obras de boscan y algunas de Garcilasso de la Vega repartidas en quatro libros [1545]
- Agustin de Zárate, Historia del descubrimiento y conquista del Peru (1555)

== Martinus Nutius II ==
Martinus Nutius II
- Born: 1553
- Died: March 18, 1608 (aged 54–55)
- Spouse: Anna Templaers (m. 1589)
- Children: 5 (including Philippus Nutius and Martinus Nutius III)

Martinus Nutius II (1553—1608) was the younger son of Martin Nutius and Marie Borrewater, and younger brother to Philippus Nutius. He became associated with his brother in the family business from 1579, and took it over completely after his brother's death in 1586. He joined the Guild of St Luke in 1587. On 23 April 1589 he married Anna Templaers. Their children were Martin (born 1594), Philippus (born 1597), Maria (born 1601), Michel (born 1603), and Jean-Baptiste (born 1606).

The younger Nutius was the printer of Jerome Nadal's Evangelicae Historiae Imagines (1593), a project in which Christopher Plantin, who died in 1589, had originally been involved. He died on 18 March 1608. The business was carried on under the name "Heirs of Martin Nutius", but as his oldest child was still only 14 at the time of his death, others must also have been involved. From 1614 to 1618 the imprint was "Heirs of Martin Nutius with Jean Meursius", returning to "Heirs of Martin Nutius" from 1618 to 1623.

=== Publications ===
- Jerome Nadal, Evangelicae historiae imagines (1593)
- Jerome Nadal, Adnotationes et meditationes in evangelia (1595)
- Jerome Nadal, Evangelicae historiae imagines (third edition, 1596)
- Balthazar Ayala, De jure et officiis bellicis et disciplina militari (second edition, 1597)
- Jean Bosquet, La Réduction de la ville de Bone (1599)
- Joannes David, Christelijcken bie-corf der H. Roomscher Kercke (1600)
- Diego de Torres Bollo, De rebus Peruanis, translated by John Hay (1604)
- De rebus Japonicis, Indicis et Peruanis epistolae recentiores, translated by John Hay (1605)

== Martinus Nutius III ==
Martinus Nutius III
- Born: 1594
- Died: 1638 (aged 43–44)
- Spouse: Catherine Galle (m. 1618, died) Catherine Galle (m. 1635)

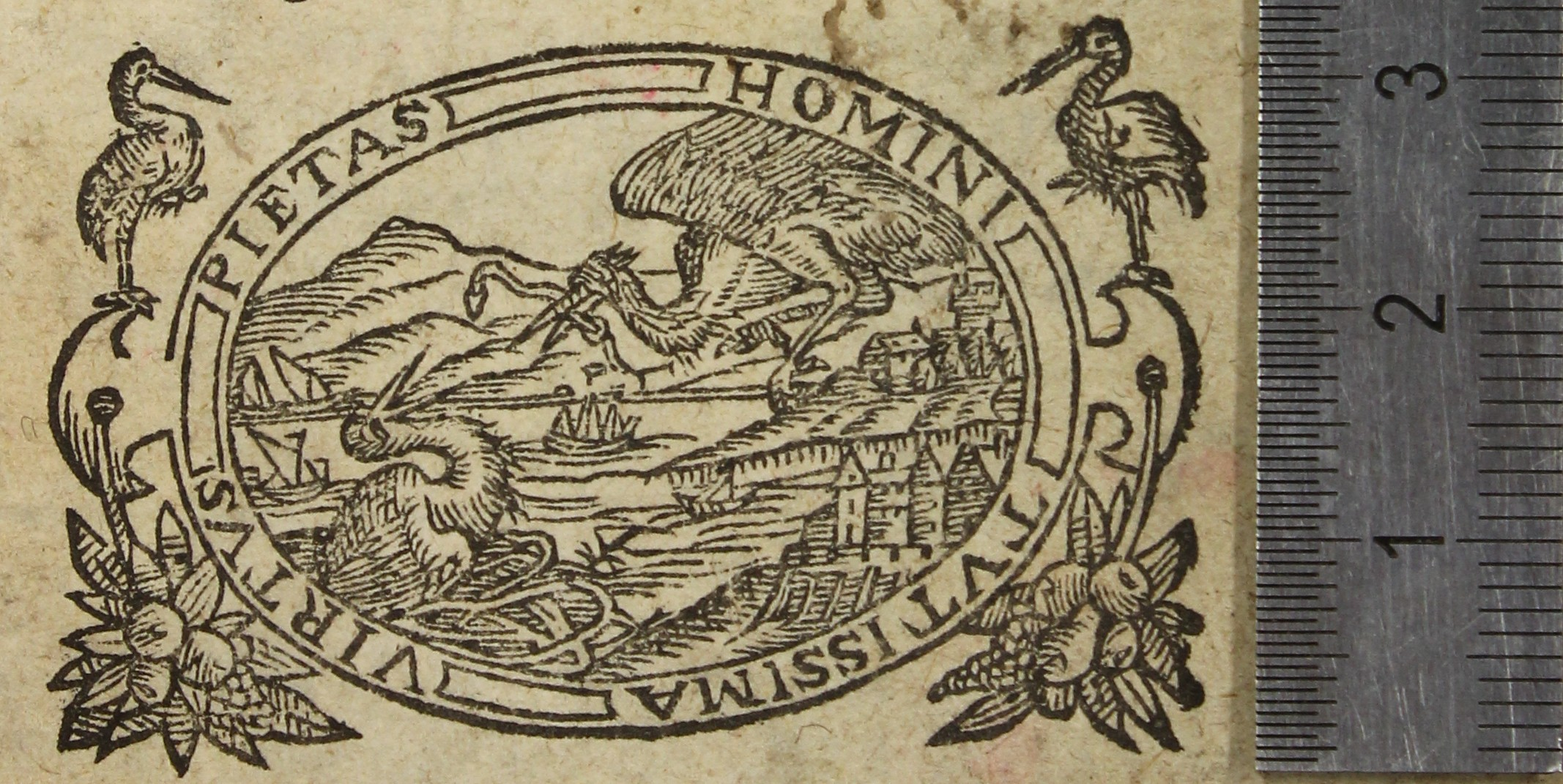
Printer's device of Martinus Nutius III, as used in Nomenclator: in qvo propria nomina omnium rerum Gallicâ Belgicâque linguis explicantur, found in University of Antwerp - Library Ruusbroecgenootschap 2103 H 12 b (f. A1 recto)

Martinus Nutius III (1594—1638) was the oldest son of Martinus Nutius II. He was received as a master in the Guild of St Luke in 1613 but continued to work under the imprint "Heirs of Martin Nutius" until 1623. On 24 November 1618 he married Catherine Galle, daughter of Theodore Galle and Catherine Moerentorf (daughter of Jan Moretus and granddaughter of Christopher Plantin). Later, on 29 April 1635, he married Catherine Galle, daughter of Michel Galle.

Nutius was the printer of the first nine volumes of Cornelius a Lapide's biblical commentaries. The tenth volume was printed by his heirs in 1639, and the final, eleventh volume by Joannes Meursius in 1643.

On 15 November 1638, Balthasar Moretus wrote to the bookseller Balthazar Bellerus, in Douai, asking him to take Nutius's oldest son, Martin, as an apprentice. Bellerus declined on 23 November, predicting that there would be no future for the boy in the book trade.

=== Publications ===
- Cornelius a Lapide, Commentaria in Pentateuchum Mosis (1618), as "Heirs of Martin Nutius [II]"
- Cornelius a Lapide, Commentaria in quatuor prophetas maiores (1622)
- Carolus Scribani, Politicus-Christianus (1624)
- Cornelius a Lapide, Commentaria duodecim prophetas minores (1625)
- Cornelius a Lapide, Commentaria in Omnes Divi Pauli Epistolas (1627)
- S. Norbert (1627), a Jesuit school drama about the life of Norbert of Xanten.
- Jacobus Tirinus, Commentarius in Vetus et Novum Testamentum (1632)
