= Alonso de Villegas =

Spanish writer

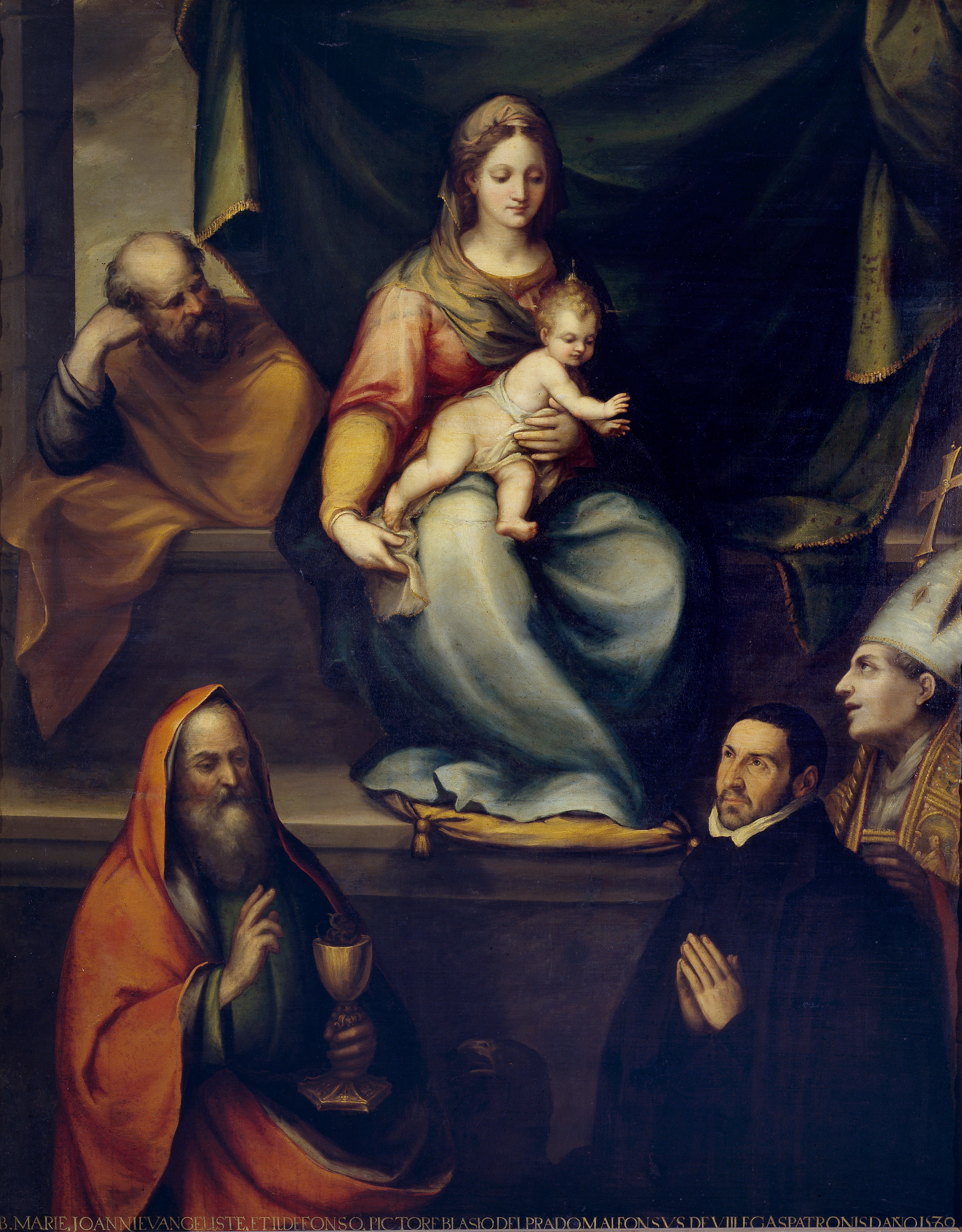
Blas de Prado: La Sagrada Familia con San Ildefonso, San Juan Evangelista y el maestro Alonso de Villegas, Museo Nacional del Prado, oil on canvas, 209 x 165 cm. The only autographed work by the painter, signed in 1589.

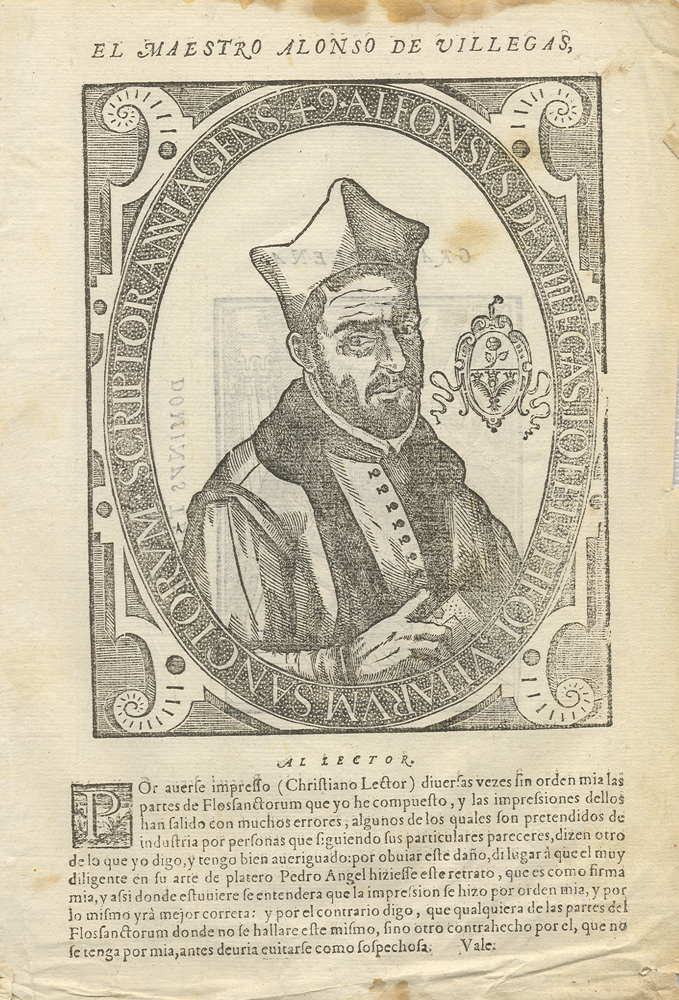
Pedro Ángel: Portrait of Alonso de Villegas at the age of 49. Flos sanctorum, Toledo, 1588. Universidad de Salamanca, Biblioteca General Histórica. The footnote, entitled "To the reader" is written by Villegas himself, and it reads "to eliminate the damage [of many pirated copies], I enlisted the diligent silverworker Pedro Ángel to create this portrait of me, which is like my own signature, and as such anywhere it appears the image will be understood that the portrait was created at my request.

Alonso de Villegas Selvago, also known as Selvago, which may also have been a second surname, of Genovese origin (Toledo, 1533 - ib., January 23, 1603) was a Spanish ecclesiastic and writer.

== Biography ==
As a student and later professor of theology at the universidad de Toledo, was a chaplain in his cathedral and baptized in the church of San Sebastián and in San Marcos in the same city, where he resided for almost his entire life.

His only known works include Comedia llamada Selvagia: en que se introduzen los amores de un cavallero llamado Selvago con una ilustre dama dicha Ysabela, efetuados por Dolosina, alcahueta famosa (Toledo: Joan Ferrer, 1554), one Life of San Isidro Labrador (Madrid, 1592), one Life of San Tirso (Toledo, 1592) and a Flos sanctorum. One of Villegas's subjects in the Flos sanctorum was Saint Irene based on a popular legend in the Iberian Peninsula called La margarita del Tajo. He also drew from Plutarch's work for the story detailing the death of Pan when Jesus was born.
