= Jan Franco =

- Born: Eersel, Duchy of Brabant
- Citizenship: Brussels
- Education: University of Leuven
- Occupations: physician, astrologer
- Relatives: Jean Baptiste Auxstruies (nephew)
- Writing career
- Years active: 1586–1611
- Period: Baroque
- Genre: almanacs
- Subject: medical astrology

Jan Franco (active 1586–1611) was a physician, mathematician and astronomer who compiled almanacs. He was born in the village of Eersel in the Duchy of Brabant and studied medicine at the University of Leuven. He settled in Brussels to practice medicine and was given the freedom of the city. He was a practicing physician at least until 1594. As he had studied both medicine and mathematics, he was asked to calculate the ephemerides, for purposes of medical astrology. This led to his work as a compiler of almanacs from 1586 to 1611. From 1612 to 1621 Arnout Coninx and his widow were selling almanacs based on Franco's drafts but completed for publication by his son, Jan Franco jr., and by Johannes Regius. At least as late as 1616 almanacs prepared by others were being sold on the strength of their association with Franco.

== Publications ==
- Almanach ende prognosticatie voer het iaer Heeren MDLXXXVI nae de oude ende nieuwe calculatie, voor dese Nederlanden principalijck dienende: met die daghelijckse ghetijden der vaert van Bruessel (Antwerp, Henrick Wouters, 1586)
- Almanach oft journael voor't schrickel-jaer ons Heeren M.D.LXXXVIII (Antwerp, Joachim Trognaesius, 1588)
- Almanach oft journael voor het jaer M.D.XCIII (Antwerp, Arnout Coninx, 1593)
- Ephemeris meteorologica (Antwerp, Arnout Coninx, 1594)
- Almanach oft journael voor het jaer M.D.XCV (Antwerp, Arnout Coninx, 1595)
- Almanach, oft journael voor t'schrickeljaer M.D.XCVI, voor den 7. climaet dienende. Met die dagelijcsche getijden der vaert van Brussel (Antwerp, Arnout Coninx, 1596)
- Almanach oft journael voor her jaer M.D.XCVIII (Antwerp, Arnout Coninx, 1598)
- Ephemeris metheorologica practica (Antwerp, Arnout Coninx, 1599)
- Kalender, oft journael, voor het jaer M.D.XCIX. voor den 7. climaet dienende. Met die dagelijcsche getijden der vaert van Brussel (Antwerp, Arnout Coninx, 1599)
- Ephemeris metheorologica. Seer schoone beschrijvinge van de revolutie ende het gulden schrickeljaer ons heeren 1600 (Antwerp, Arnout Coninx, 1600)
- Kalender oft iournael voor t'iaer ons Heeren M.D.C.XV., edited by Jan Franco jr. (Antwerp, Arnout Coninx, 1615)
- Ephemeris metheorologica (Antwerp, Arnout Coninx, 1615)
