= Jaspar d'Ennetières =

French-language poet

Jaspar d'Ennetières, knight, lord of Beaumé (c. 1555–1622) was a French-language poet who held civic and provincial office in the Spanish Netherlands.

== Life ==
Jaspar was born in Tournai around 1555, the son of François d'Ennetières, lord of Beaumé, and Barbe Boulenger, lady of Maisnil. His aunt, Marie d'Ennetières, was also a writer. He married Anne de la Rivière. Their eldest son, Jean (c. 1590–1661), likewise became a poet.

Jaspar was a commissioner of domains and finances to the Archdukes Albert and Isabella, as well as serving in the city government of Tournai between 1589 and 1608. He died on 20 April 1622.

== Works ==
Ennetières contributed commendatory verses to various volumes, including two sonnets in praise of Jean Boucher's Couronne Mystique (Tournai, 1623), and four in Jeanne de Cambry's Traicté de la ruine de l'amour propre et bâtiment de l'amour divin (Tournai, 1627). He produced at least two standalone books:

- Elegie et chans funèbres sur le trèspas de madamoyselle Marguerite de Marguais (Douai, Jean Bogard, 1584)
- La Vie de saint Malchus, moine syrien, tirée des épitres de S. Hierosme (Tournai, Adrien Quinqué, 1621)

There is reference to a verse Life of St Paul the Hermit in another poem, but if it was written it does not survive.
