= Christophe Beys =

- Born: 18 June 1575; Paris, Kingdom of France
- Died: 7 September 1647 (aged 72); Lille, Spanish Netherlands
- Education: Jesuit College, Antwerp; Plantin Press
- Occupations: printer and bookseller
- Era: Baroque

Christophe Beys (1575–1647) was a printer in the Kingdom of France and the Spanish Netherlands. He was a grandson of Christophe Plantin.

== Life ==
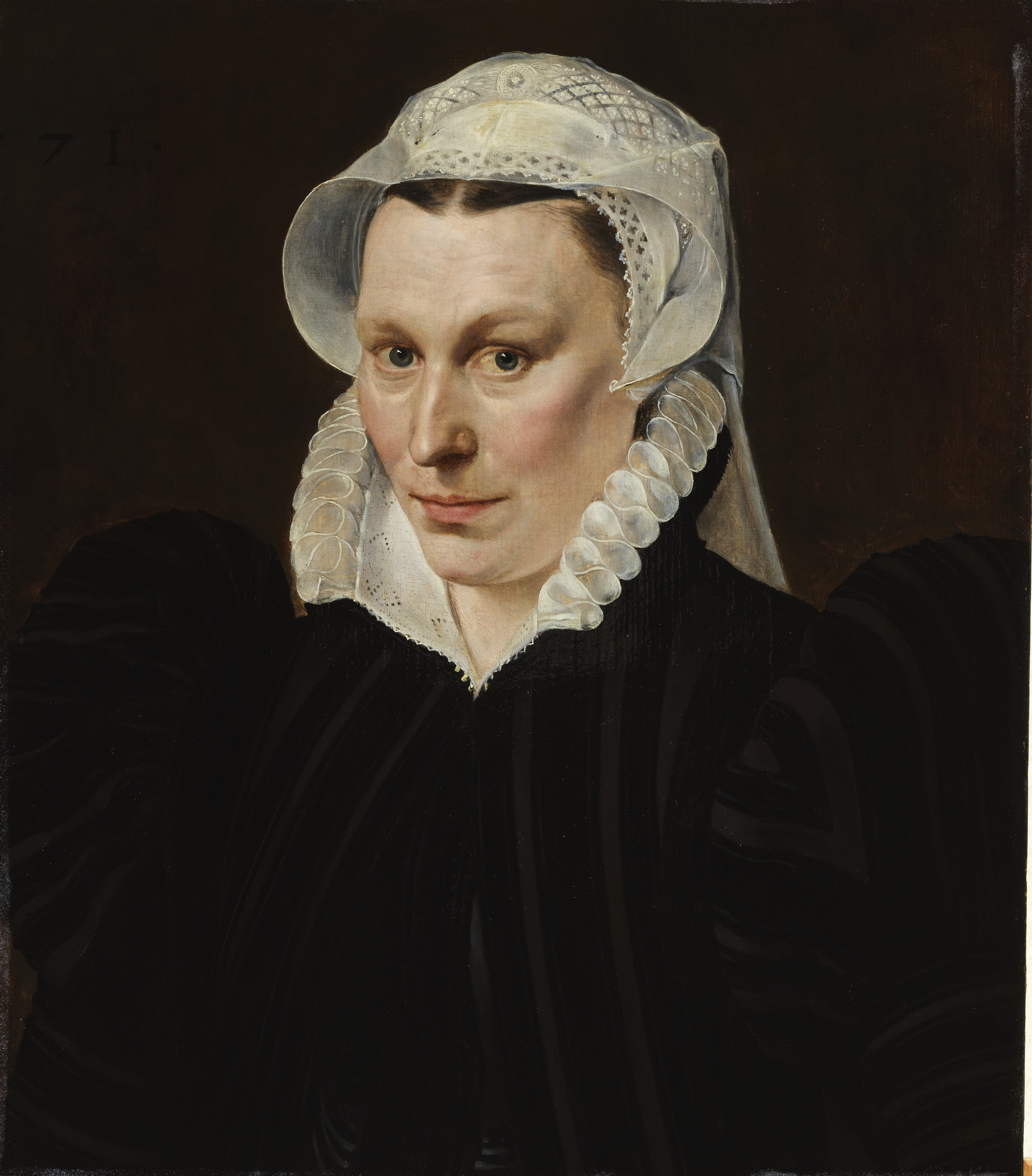
Portrait of Magdalena Plantin (Beys' mother), by Adriaen Thomasz Key, in the collection of the Plantin-Moretus Museum, Antwerp

Beys was born in Paris on 18 June 1575, the son of Gilles Beys and Magdalena Plantin. In 1583 he was sent to his grandfather, Christopher Plantin, in Antwerp. He was trained as a printer at the Plantin Press and was educated at the Jesuit college. In May 1595 he succeeded his father as head of the Paris branch of the Plantin office.

In 1600 he was sued for debt by his father-in-law, Adrien Périer. On 6 April 1601 he lost his status as a sworn printer. In 1608 he opened a new business in Rennes, where he was to become involved in a witchcraft case the following year. Via Dinan he fled to Saint-Omer, where he worked as a bookbinder for the English College Press. His wife and his apprentice, Lambert Foncq, joined him there with what had been salvaged of the Rennes printing shop. In 1610 Beys set up shop in Lille. In 1628 his daughter Georgine married Simon Le Francq, who also became a printer-bookseller in Lille.

Beys died in Lille, sick and in poverty, on 7 September 1647.

== Works ==
- Floris Van der Haer, Les Chastelains de Lille (1611)
- Jean-Baptiste Gramaye, Flandria Franca (1612)
- William Colson, Un repertoire artificiel general et perpetuel des comptes (1613)
- L'Heureux progrez des Armes Imperialles (1625)
- Coustumes et usages de la ville, taille, banlieue et eschevinage de Lille (1629)
