= Cornelius Lancilottus =

Baroque spiritual writer and biographer

Cornelius Lancilottus, OESA (c. 1575–1622) was a Baroque spiritual writer and a biographer of Augustine of Hippo.

== Life ==
Lancilottus was born in Mechelen (then in the Habsburg Netherlands) in 1575 or 1576, the son of Andreas Lancelotte and Margaretha Vischavens. His father was secretary to the Great Council of Mechelen. Around 1591, still in his mid-teens, he joined the Augustinians. Within the order he became a Doctor of Sacred Theology, and served as prior in Cologne and Hasselt. He founded the Augustinian house in Antwerp and was its first prior. He was instrumental in Postel Abbey becoming independent of Floreffe Abbey in 1613.

He contracted a disease while tending to sick and wounded soldiers evacuated from the Siege of Bergen op Zoom in 1622, and died 20 October of that year, aged 46. He was buried in the choir of the church of the Augustinian house in Antwerp.

== Works ==
- Nectar et Antidotum, confectum ex medullis Operum S. Augustini, digestum ordine alphabetico, contra quosvis Sectarios (n.p.d.)
- Pancarpium Augustinianum, continens SS. Patris Augustini, Monicae, Nicolai Tolentinatis, Beatae Virginis Mariae Encomium et Sodalitatis Corrigiatae della Consolatione Privilegia; cum Tractatu de Indulgentiis et quibusdum Parergis (Antwerp, 1616)
- S. Aurelii Augustini, Hipponensis Episcopi et S.R.E. Doctoris Vita; piis omnibus, nec non de vera fide, deque vitae statu deliberantibus utilissima (Antwerp, 1616)
  - Dutch translation by Jan van Blitterswyck, D'Leven van den H. Vader S. Augustijn (Antwerp, Hieronymus Verdussen, 1621)
- Lucerna vitae perfectae, cum Sacordotalis, tam Monachalis, juxta Regulam D. Augustini SS. Scripturis, Patrum auctoritatibus et exemplis fusè illustratum (Antwerp, 1642)
