= Jean-Baptiste Gramaye =

Jean-Baptiste Gramaye (Antwerp, 1579 - Lübeck, 1635) was an early modern historian of the Southern Netherlands. He studied law and became a professor at Leuven University. Later he was employed as court historian by Albert VII, Archduke of Austria. For five months in 1619 he was a prisoner in Barbary, an experience that changed the focus of his scholarship from the Low Countries to Africa.

== Works ==
- Andromede Belgica dicta Alberto Austriaco, Isabellae Clarae Eugeniae acta a Falconis alumnis, tertio ab inauguratis principibus die (Leuven, Laurence Kellam, 1600)
- Asia, sive historia universalis Asiaticarum gentium et rerum domi forisque gestarum (Brussels, Widow and Heirs of Joannes Bellerus, 1604) Available on Google Books
- Gallo-Brabantia (Brussels, Jan Mommaert, 1606) Available on Google Books
- Bruxella cum suo comitatu (Brussels, Jan Mommaert, 1606) Available on Google Books
- Thenae et Brabantia ultra velpam quae olim Hasbaniae pars (Brussels, Jan Mommaert, 1606) Available on Google Books
- Arscotum Ducatus cum suis Baronatibus (Brussels, Jan Mommaert, 1606) Available on Google Books and KU Leuven Special Collections (high quality)
- Historia Brabantica (Leuven, Joannes Masius, 1607) Available on Google Books
- Historiæ et antiqvitatvm vrbis Cameracensis svmma capita ex memoriis (Brussel, Rutger Velpius, 1608) Available at KU Leuven Special Collections
- Antverpiae antiquitates (Brussels, Jan Mommaert, 1610) Available on Google Books
- Antiquitates illustrissimi ducatus Brabantiae (Brussels, Jan Mommaert, 1610) Available on Google Books
- Taxandria (Brussels, Rutger Velpius, 1610) Available on Google Books
- Flandria Franca (Lille, Christophe Beys, 1612) Available on Google Books
- Rerum Duacensium Libri Tres (Douai, Jan Bogard; Antwerp, Hieronymus Verdussen; etc., 1618) Available on Google Books
- Africae illustratae libri decem (Tournai, Adrien Quinque, 1622) Available on Google Books
- Specimen linguarum et litterarum orbis nostri (Leuven, Joannes Masius, 1622) Available in Bibliothèque nationale de France
- Diarium rerum Argelae gestarum ab anno MDCXIX (Cologne, Albinus Dusseldorpff, 1623) Available on Google Books
- Respublica Namurcensis, Hannoniae et Lutsenburgensis (Amsterdam, Jan Janssens, 1634) Available on Google Books
- Antiquitates belgicae, published posthumously, 1708.
