= 1580s in the Southern Netherlands =

- 1580s in Belgium
- Other decades
- 1560s | 1570s | 1580s | 1590s | 1600s

Events from the 1580s in the Spanish Netherlands and Prince-bishopric of Liège.

== Incumbents ==
=== Habsburg Netherlands ===
Monarch – Philip II, King of Spain and Duke of Brabant, of Luxembourg, etc.

Governor General – Alexander Farnese, Prince (later Duke) of Parma

=== Prince-Bishopric of Liège ===
Prince-Bishop – Gerard van Groesbeeck to December 1580; Ernest of Bavaria from January 1581

== Events ==
1580

- 3 March – George de Lalaing, Count of Rennenberg, reconciled to Philip II of Spain
- 9 April – English Fury at Mechelen
- 7 May – Public disputation on the Eucharist in Brussels
- 9 June – Taking of Diest by rebel forces
- 9 August – Unsuccessful rebel assault on Enghien

1581

- 30 January – Ernest of Bavaria elected as Prince-bishop of Liège
- 11 February – Ernest of Bavaria elected Prince-abbot of Stavelot
- 15 June – joyous entry of Ernest of Bavaria in Liège
- 1 July – Catholic worship prohibited in Antwerp
- 26 July – Union of Utrecht signs Act of Abjuration, repudiating Philip II of Spain as sovereign of the Netherlands
- Sack of Breda by forces led by Claude de Berlaymont
- 30 November – Alexander Farnese takes Tournai

1582

- 19 February – festive reception of Francis, Duke of Anjou in Antwerp
- 30 April – Jesuit school opens in Liège
- 21 December – Gregorian calendar adopted in the Southern Netherlands

1583

- 17 January – French Fury at Antwerp: failed coup by Francis, Duke of Anjou
- 16 February – Simon Stevin matriculates at Leiden University
- 23 May – Ernest of Bavaria, Prince-Bishop of Liège, elected Archbishop-Elector of Cologne
- 17 June – Battle of Steenbergen (1583)
- 30 October – Joannes Hauchin consecrated as Archbishop of Mechelen
- 2 November – Gregorian calendar adopted in Prince-Bishopric of Liège
- 3 November – Taking of Aalst
- 30 November – Philips of Marnix, Lord of Saint-Aldegonde, appointed mayor of Antwerp

1584

- 7 April – End of the Siege of Ypres (1584)
- 28 May – Bruges surrendered to Alexander Farnese
- 17 August – Taking of Dendermonde
- 17 September – Surrender of Ghent

1585

- 10 March – Surrender of Brussels
- 10 August – Treaty of Nonsuch: Elizabeth I publicly pledges support to Dutch Revolt
- 17 August – Fall of Antwerp
- 3 November – Relics of St Rumbold restored to St Rumbold's Cathedral

1586

- 18 September – Alexander Farnese becomes Duke of Parma

1587

- 15 May – Edict, ordonnance et instruction sur l'exercice et l'administration de la jurisdiction et justice militaire

1588

- 29 May – Jean Vendeville consecrated bishop of Tournai
  - 22 July – William Damasus Lindanus installed as bishop of Ghent
  - 28 July – Battle of Gravelines

1589

- Ecclesiastical censorship of the press and the theatre established by Ernest of Bavaria, Prince-Bishop of Liège, Lettres patentes pour la conservation et maintien de la foy et religion chrestienne catholique apostolique romaine es païz de l'evesché et principauté de Liége (printed in Liège by Gautier Morberius)

== Publications ==
1580

- Le Renart decouvert (Mons, Rutger Velpius) – a satire of William of Orange written anonymously by Jean Richardot

1581

- Nicasius Van der Schuere, Een cleyne of corte institutie dat is onderwysinghe der christelijcker religie ghestelt in locos communes (Ghent, Gauthier Manilius) – a Dutch abridgement of Calvin's Institutes (available on Google Books)
- Jean Michel, L'anatomie du corps politique comparé au corps humain, translated by Paul du Mont (Douai, Jean Bogard), available on Google Books

1583

- Justus Lipsius, De Constantia (Antwerp, Plantin Press)
- Statuta synodi dioecesanae audomarensis, anno M D LXXXIII (Douai, Jean Bogard) – the statutes of the diocesan synod called by Jean Six to introduce Tridentine reform in the diocese of Saint-Omer

1585

- Articulen ende conditien vanden tractate aengegaen ende ghesloten tusschen die Prince van Parma ende de stadt van Bruessele (Brussels, Jan Mommaert) – the terms of the surrender of Brussels

1587

- Sancho de Londoño, Discurso sobre la forma de reducir la disciplina militar a mejor y antiguo estado (Brussels, Rutger Velpius)
- William Allen's, The copie of a letter concerning the yeelding up of Daventrie unto his catholike majestie, by sir William Stanley knight (Antwerp, Joachim Trognaesius) – a justification of Sir William Stanley's surrender of Deventer
- Floris Van der Haer, De initiis tumultuum Belgicorum (Douai, Jean Bogard), the first substantial history of the origins of the Dutch Revolt (available on Google Books)

1588

- Jan Franco, Almanach oft journael voor't schrickel- jaer ons Heeren M.D.LXXXVIII (Antwerp, Joachim Trognaesius) – a calendar for the year 1588
- Statuta synodalia dioecesis Atrebatensis cum praedecessorum statutis adjectis (Arras, printed by Joachim Trognaesius for Claude de Buyens) – statutes of the diocesan synod of the diocese of Arras
- William Allen, An admonition to the nobility and people of England and Ireland, intended to be distributed in the event of a successful Spanish landing in England, printed anonymously by Arnout Coninx but never published

1589

- Francisco de Valdés, Espeio, y deceplina militar (Brussels, Rutger Velpius)
- I. B., The copy of a letter lately written by a Spanishe gentleman, to his friend in England in refutation of sundry calumnies, there falsly bruited, and spred emonge the people (Antwerp, Joachim Trognaesius) – counter-propaganda regarding the Spanish Armada
- Cort verhael vanden aenslach die d'Engelsche hebben aenhevanghen in Spaengien ende Portugael (Antwerp, Joachim Trognaesius) – an account of the English Armada's activities on the coasts of Spain and Portugal

== Births ==
1580

- 12 January - Jan Baptist van Helmont (died 1644), alchemist
- 6 June - Godefroy Wendelin (died 1667), astronomer
- 9 June - Daniel Heinsius (died 1655), Dutch poet and humanist

1581

- date unknown
  - Frans Francken the Younger (died 1642), painter

1582

- 11 April - Justus de Harduwijn (died 1636), poet
- 24 September (baptism) - Deodat del Monte (died 1644), painter, engineer and art dealer
- date unknown
  - Wouter Abts (died 1642/3), painter
  - Jacob van Hulsdonck (died 1647), painter
  - David Teniers the Elder (died 1649), painter

1583

- 10 April - Nicolaus Vernulaeus (died 1649), Neo-Latin playwright
- 11/21 August - Samuel Blommaert (died 1651), director of the Dutch West India Company
- date unknown
  - Hendrik van der Borcht the Elder (died 1651), engraver and painter
  - Henricus Calenus (died 1653), Jansenist clergyman

1584

- 12 February - Caspar Barlaeus (died 1648), Dutch humanist
- 18 November - Gaspar de Crayer (died 1669), painter
- date unknown
  - Frederick de Marselaer (died 1670), mayor of Brussels and author of a treatise on diplomacy
  - Willem van Nieulandt II (died 1635), painter and playwright
  - Cornelis de Vos (died 1651), painter

1585

- 25 February - Pieter van den Broecke (died 1640), merchant of the Dutch East India Company
- 28 April - Philippe d'Outreman (died 1652), Jesuit author
- 28 October - Cornelius Jansen (died 1638), theologian and bishop of Ypres
- 31 December - Gonzalo de Córdoba (died 1645), commander in the Army of Flanders
- date unknown
  - Lorenz van Steenwinckel (died 1619), architect

1586

- 15 September - Antonius Sanderus (died 1664), ecclesiastical historian
- date unknown
  - Schelte a Bolswert (died 1659), engraver
  - Gillis II Coignet (died 1641), painter
  - Gijsbrecht Leytens (died 1656), painter
  - Francisco de Moncada, 3rd Marquis of Aitona (died 1635), acting Governor General of the Spanish Netherlands, 1633-1634
  - David Rijckaert II (died 1642), painter and art dealer

1587

- 17 January (baptism) - Alexander Adriaenssen (died 1661), painter
- 20 February - Emanuel Sueyro (died 1629), spymaster and historian
- 23 April - Gaspard Nemius (died 1667), bishop of Antwerp and archbishop of Cambrai
- 3 September - Libert Froidmont (died 1653), theologian and scientist
- 18 October - Philippe-Charles, 3rd Count of Arenberg (died 1640), statesman
- 17 November - Louis De Geer (died 1652), arms manufacturer
- 8 December (baptism) - Martin Ryckaert (died 1631), painter
- date unknown
  - Maria Faydherbe (died 1643), sculptor
  - Antonius de Liedekerke (died 1661), Dutch sea captain and diplomat
  - Adriaen van Nieulandt (died 1658), Dutch painter and engraver
  - Margriet van Noort (died 1646), Carmelite mystic

1588

- 12 March - Herman de Neyt (died 1642), painter and art dealer
- 9 May - Herman Hugo (died 1629), Jesuit author
- date unknown
  - Jean de Beck (died 1648), governor of Luxembourg
  - Jean-Jacques Chifflet (died 1660), physician to the Brussels court, antiquary
  - Benedictus van Haeften (died 1648), Benedictine author
  - Johannes van Mildert (died 1638), sculptor

1589

- 6 April (baptism) - Jan Tilens (died 1630), painter
- 2 July (baptism) - Guilielmus Messaus (died 1640), composer
- 15 July (baptism) - Cornelis Bol (died 1666), painter and etcher
- 1 August - Alexandrine von Taxis (died 1666), postmistress general
- date unknown
  - Abraham Govaerts (died 1626), painter

Year uncertain

- Boetius à Bolswert (died 1633), engraver

== Deaths ==
1580

- 1 August - Everard Mercurian (born 1514)
- 15 September - Geert van Turnhout (born about 1530), composer
- 26 October - Anna of Austria (born 1549), Queen of Spain, Duchess of Brabant, etc.
- 23 December - Gerard van Groesbeeck, Prince-Bishop of Liège

1581

- 19 January - Gillis Hooftman (born 1521), merchant and shipbuilder
- 22 January - Joos de Damhouder (born 1507), legal scholar
- 7 May - Alexander Utendal (born 1543/45), composer
- 13 July - Jean Scheyfve (born about 1515), former Chancellor of Brabant
- 23 July - George de Lalaing (born about 1550), count of Rennenberg
- 19 September - Frans Pourbus the Elder (born 1545), painter
- date unknown
  - Petrus Divaeus (born 1535), historian
  - Willem de Pannemaker (born 1512/14), tapestry designer.
  - Nicholas Sanders (born about 1530), former professor at Louvain, missing presumed dead in Ireland

1582

- 24 May - Philip de Lalaing (born 1537), governor of Hainaut
- 11 December - Duke of Alva (born 1507), former Governor of the Netherlands (1567–1573)
- date unknown
  - Arnoldus Arlenius (born about 1510), humanist
  - Hans Hendrik van Paesschen (born about 1510), architect

1583

1584

- 10 July - William of Orange (born 1533) assassinated in Delft

1585

- 10 March - Rembert Dodoens (born 1517), botanist

1586

- 18 January - Margaret of Parma (born 1522), former Governor of the Netherlands (1559–1567 and 1578–1582)
- 21 September - Antoine Perrenot de Granvelle (born 1517), former Archbishop of Mechelen (1561–1582)
- 11 October - Jean Six (born 1533), bishop of Saint-Omer

1587

- 14 July - Claude de Berlaymont (born ca. 1550), nobleman and commander
- 19 September - Jacobus Pamelius (born 1536), theologian

1588

- 17 March - Petrus Dathenus (born about 1531), translator of the Heidelberg Catechism and of metrical psalms into Dutch
- 2 November - William Damasus Lindanus, Bishop of Ghent

1589

- 5 January - Joannes Hauchin (born 1527), second Archbishop of Mechelen
- 22 March - Lodovico Guicciardini (born 1521), Florentine merchant in Antwerp
- 1 July - Christophe Plantin (born about 1520), printer and bookseller in Antwerp
