= 1590s in the Southern Netherlands =

- 1590s in Belgium
- Other decades
- 1570s | 1580s | 1590s | 1600s | 1610s

Events from the 1590s in the Spanish Netherlands and Prince-bishopric of Liège.

== Incumbents ==
=== Habsburg Netherlands ===
Monarch

- Philip II, King of Spain and Duke of Brabant, of Luxembourg, etc. to September 1598
- Isabella Clara Eugenia and Albert VII, Archduke of Austria, as co-sovereigns from September 1598.

Governor General

- Alexander Farnese, Duke of Parma, to 1592
- Peter Ernst I von Mansfeld-Vorderort 1592–1594
- Archduke Ernest of Austria 1594–1595
- Pedro Henriquez de Acevedo, Count of Fuentes, acting governor general 1595–1596
- Albert VII, Archduke of Austria 1596–1598
- Margrave Andrew of Burgau, acting governor general 1598–1599

=== Prince-Bishopric of Liège ===
Prince-Bishop

- Ernest of Bavaria

== Events ==
1590

- 4 March – Loss of Breda

1591

1592

- 28 May – Diocesan Seminary of Liège opens

1593

1594

- Joyous Entry into Brussels and Antwerp of Archduke Ernest of Austria

1595

- 7 to 20 March – Siege of Huy
- 14 October – Loss and retaking of Lier
- 28 December – Ernest of Bavaria appoints André Streignart, Jean Chapeauville, Pierre Oranus, and Jean Malempeter to an inquisitorial witchcraft tribunal to investigate and judge the case of Jean Delvaux, a monk of Stavelot Abbey who had voluntarily confessed to attending gatherings of witches.

1596

- 24 April – Taking of Calais
- 23 May – Taking of Ardres

1597

- 24 January – Battle of Turnhout
- 2 April – Condemnation of Jean Delvaux for witchcraft

1598

- 2 May – Peace of Vervins concluded

1599

- 18 April – Marriage of Isabella Clara Eugenia and Albert VII, Archduke of Austria
- 5 September – Joyous Entry into Brussels of Isabella Clara Eugenia and Albert VII, Archduke of Austria, as co-sovereigns

== Births ==
1590

- Jacques Backereel
- Frederik Bouttats the Elder
- Christophe Butkens
- Andries van Eertvelt
- Hubertus Reulandt
- Daniel Seghers
- Caesar Joachim Trognaesius
- Leonard Voeller

1591

- Jacques Fouquier
- Nicolas Régnier
- Jan Roos (painter)
- Johannes Chrysostomus vander Sterre
- Johann von Werth

1592

- Balthasar Cordier
- Balthazar Gerbier
- Pieter Snayers
- Jean de Wachtendonck
- Cornelis de Wael
- Lucas de Wael

1593

- Adriaen de Bie

1594

1595

1596

1597

1598

1599

== Deaths ==
1590

1591

1592

1593

1594

- 14 June – Orlando di Lasso (born c. 1532), composer
- 2 December – Gerardus Mercator (born 1512), cartographer

1595

- 20 February - Archduke Ernest of Austria
- 26 April – Laevinus Torrentius (born 1525), bishop of Antwerp

1596

- 4 January - Cristóbal de Mondragón

1597

1598

1599
