= Pannemaeker =

Family of tapestry weavers from the Southern Netherlands

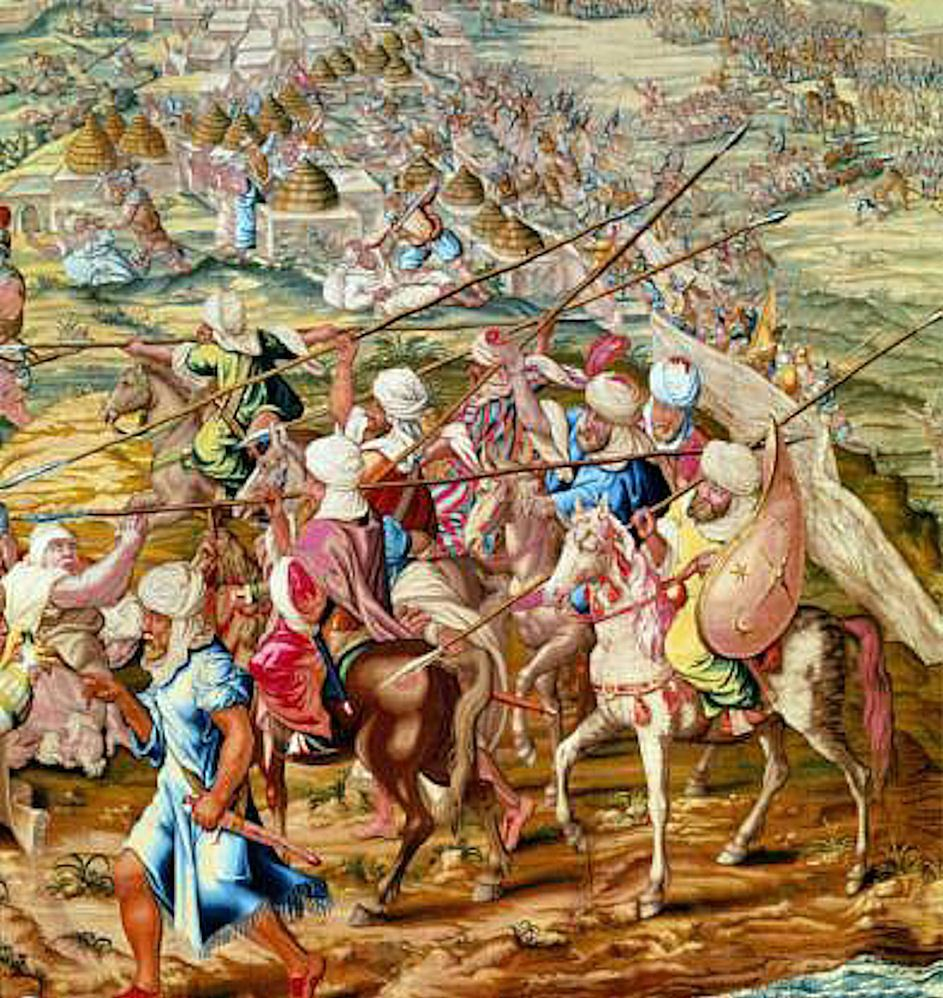
Part of tapestry Conquest of Tunis 1535 by Willem de Pannemaeker

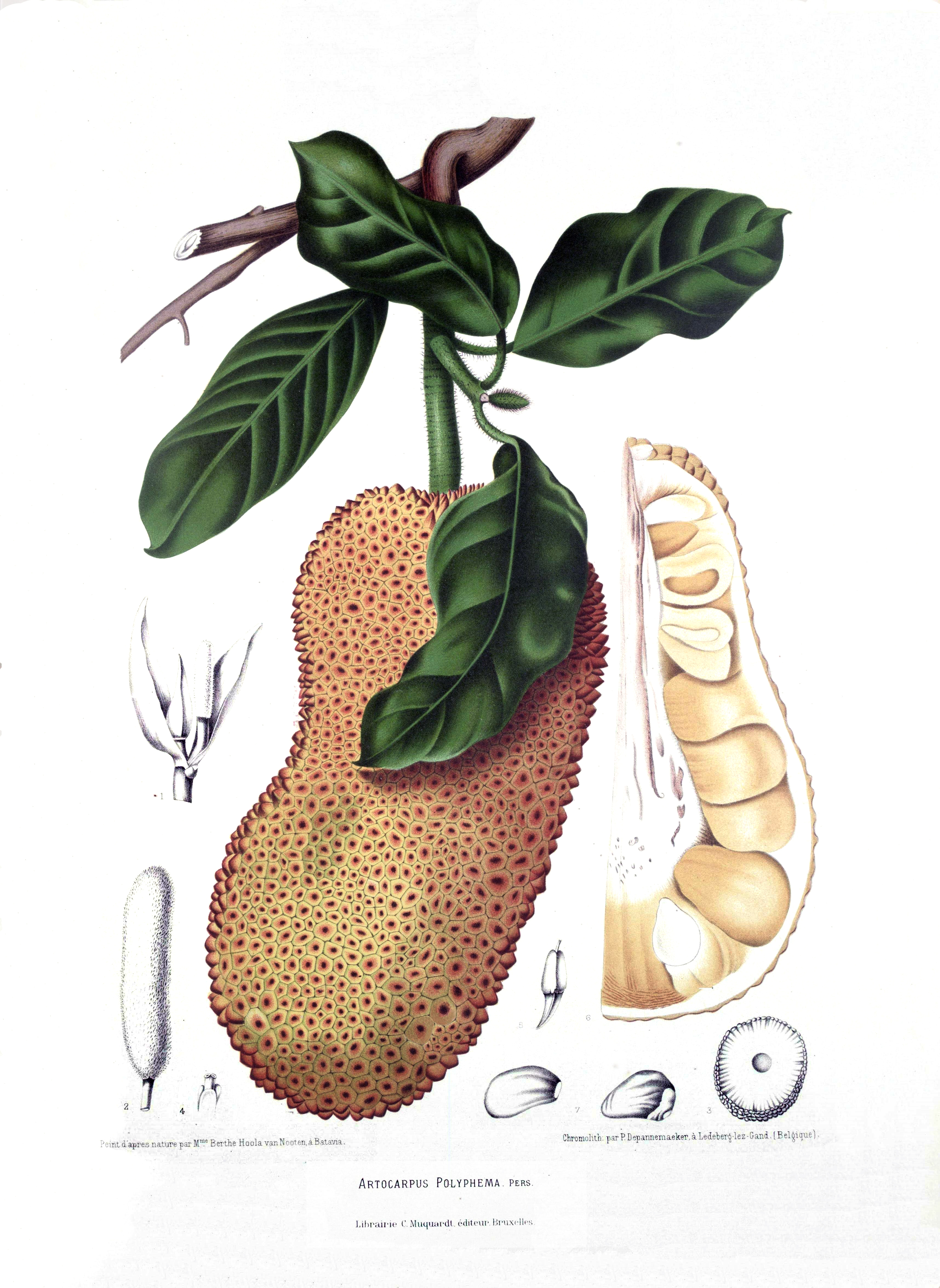
Artocarpus integer lithographed by Pieter de Pannemaeker

The family of de Pannemaeker or de Pannemaker were tapestry weavers from the Southern Netherlands, more or less equivalent to modern-day Belgium.

== History ==
=== Pieter de Pannemaeker ===
Pieter de Pannemaeker (fl. 1517–32), working from Brussels, was a celebrated weaver who, for European royalty, created tapestries resplendent with gold and silver threads, and expensive fine silks and woollen items.

In 1520, Pieter de Pannemaeker commissioned the artist Bernard van Orley to make tapestry cartoons for his workshop. A surviving fragment depicts the Allegory of the Four Winds.

Pannemaeker was court weaver to Margaret of Austria, Regent of the Southern Netherlands, who commissioned the Passion in four parts, and in 1523, she ordered an imposing dais made up of three tapestries, which later featured in the abdication ceremony of Emperor Charles V.

In 1527, Pieter de Pannemaeker and van Orley were brought before the Inquisition at Leuven for attending the Protestant sermons of Lutheran preacher Claes van der Elst.

Pieter was at first stripped of his title, but later let off with the payment of an annual fine, and by 1532 was producing tapestries for Francis I of France.

In the 19th century, when Belgium was the leading center for botanical publishing, the Ghent printmaker, landscape and botanical painter Pieter De Pannemaeker produced some 3,000 illustrations for botanical books and periodicals such as Flore des Serres et des Jardins de l'Europe and Lindenia. He received the Croix de Chevalier de l'Ordre du Mérite Agricole from the French government in 1886 for his contributions to botanical science and horticulture.

=== Willem ===
Pieter's son Willem (1514–1581) became an extremely influential figure in the weaving industry, his mark being found on many works acquired by the House of Habsburg between the 1540s and 1560s. From cartoons by Jan Cornelisz Vermeyen, Willem produced the twelve-piece Conquest of Tunis for Emperor Charles V, a landmark work created from 1546 to 1554. Among his patrons were Cardinal Granvelle and the 3rd Duke of Alba. His wealth enabled him to purchase the van Aelst property in 1560.

=== Erasmus de Pannemaker ===
Erasmus de Pannemaker (fl.1644–77) operated two looms in Brussels. His mark can be found on the massive tapestry History of Rome. Erasmus and his brother Francois, who died in Lille in 1700, produced six panels for an Antwerp dealer in 1669.

=== Francois and Andre ===
Francois and his son Andre are recorded as weavers at Tournai, also working for Gobelins tapestries in Paris before settling in Lille.
