= Erasmus de Bie =

Flemish painter

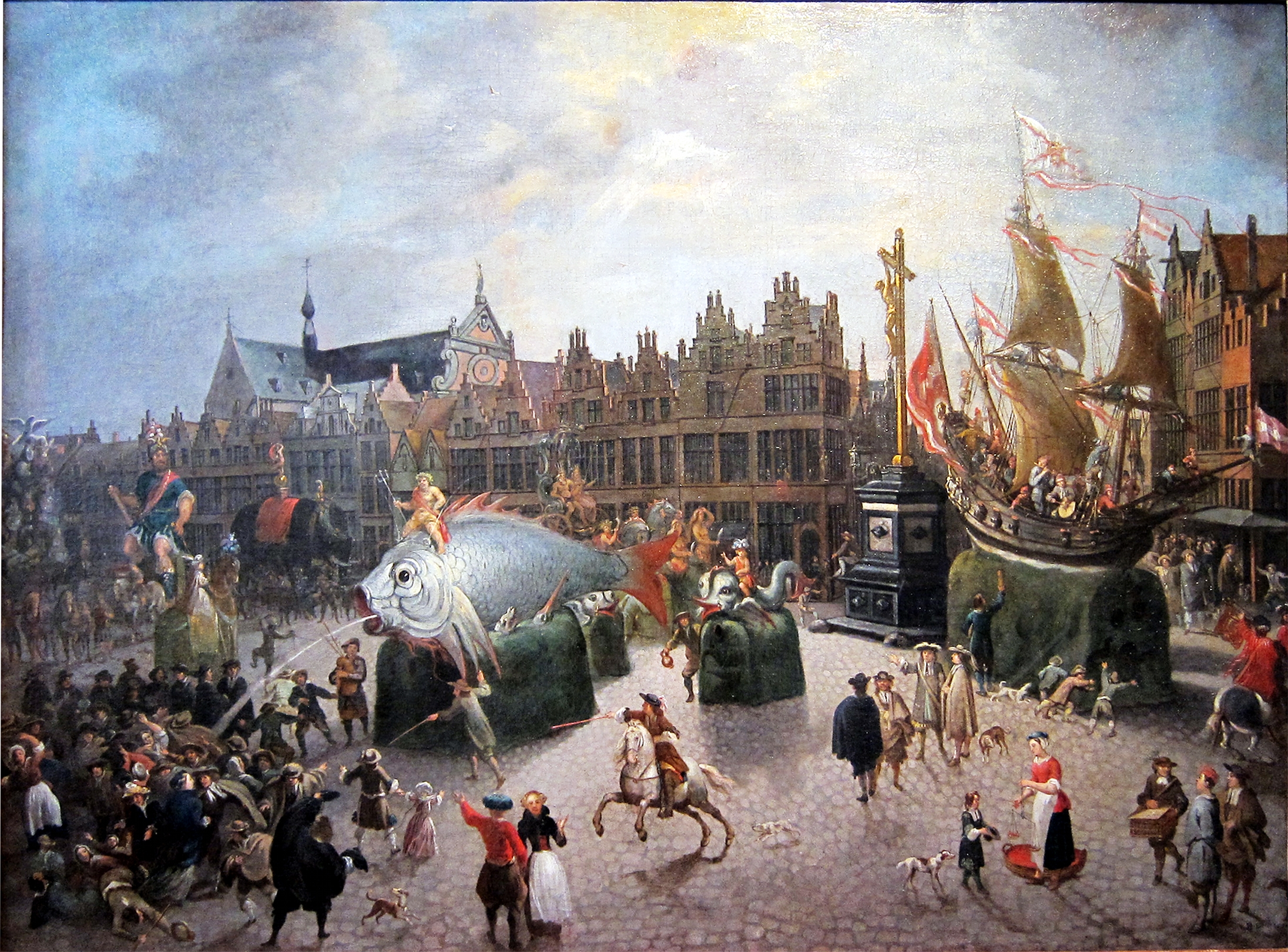
The Ommegang in Antwerp

Erasmus de Bie (1629–1675) was a Flemish Baroque painter known for his city views and genre scenes. He depicted several lively scenes of large public celebrations in his hometown of Antwerp. It is not clear whether the views of Italianate cities and landscapes attributed to him are the work of Adriaen de Bie, a Flemish painter from Lier who worked in Italy for a while.

== Life ==
Very little is known about the life of Erasmus de Bie. He was born in Antwerp, the son of the painter Frans de Bie the Elder. He was baptised on 20 December 1629 in the St. Walburga church in Antwerp.

He became a pupil of David Ryckaert III in 1641 and was admitted as a master in the Antwerp Guild of St. Luke in 1645–1646.

He married Catharina Douglas, called de Schot (the Scot), and was the father of Frans and Jan Baptist de Bie, who both became painters. Jan Baptist emigrated to Vienna where he remained active.

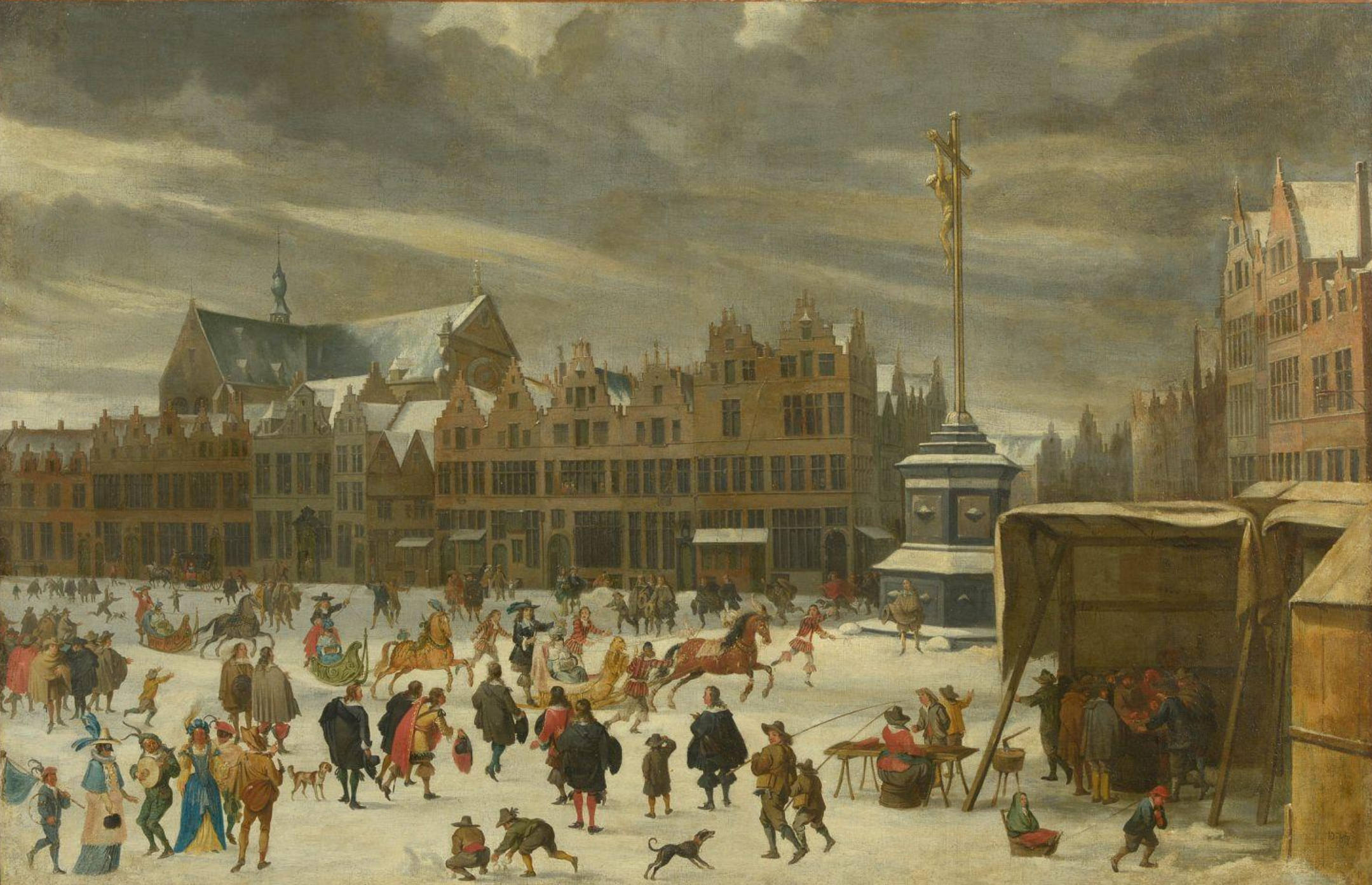
Winter games on the snow-covered Meir in Antwerp

Erasmus de Bie had pupils in 1660 and in 1666, including his son Frans.

He died in Antwerp in 1675.

== Work ==
Erasmus de Bie is known for his lively city scenes and genre scenes and some landscape paintings. He is also mentioned as the creator of religious scenes and compositions with animals. He is also mentioned as the author of at least one winterscape and two seascapes. It is not clear whether the views of Italianate cities and landscapes attributed to him are the work of Adriaen de Bie, a Flemish painter from Lier who worked in Italy for some time. His surviving signatures are in capital letters: ED (in ligature) BIE.

His main specialty was the composition of animated townscapes, in particular of city squares. His composition The Ommegang in Antwerp is an example of such a work. It was reinterpreted by various Flemish artists including Alexander van Bredael. It may itself have been inspired by Pieter van Aelst's painting with the same theme. Another lively city scene of Antwerp is the Figures in front of the frozen Scheldt in Antwerp painted in 1670 (Artcurial sale of 13 November 2018 lot 43). It shows a winter landscape of the river Scheldt, seen from the Antwerp quays. The Scheld is frozen solid and several tents and pavilions selling all kinds of food have been constructed on the ice. Several inhabitants of Antwerp are seen playing on the icy river, enjoying banquets and engaging in other amusements during the winter of 1670. The artist depicts various amusing scenes such as a woman on the verge of falling out of a sleigh pulled by a horse, a man defecating on the ice who is being chased away and a couple of men engaged in a brawl. Fellow Antwerp artist Sebastiaen Vrancx (1573–1647) painted half a century earlier the Ice pleasure on the Scheldt in Antwerp (Rijksmuseum, Amsterdam) showing a similar view of Antwerp's citizens having fun on the Scheldt.

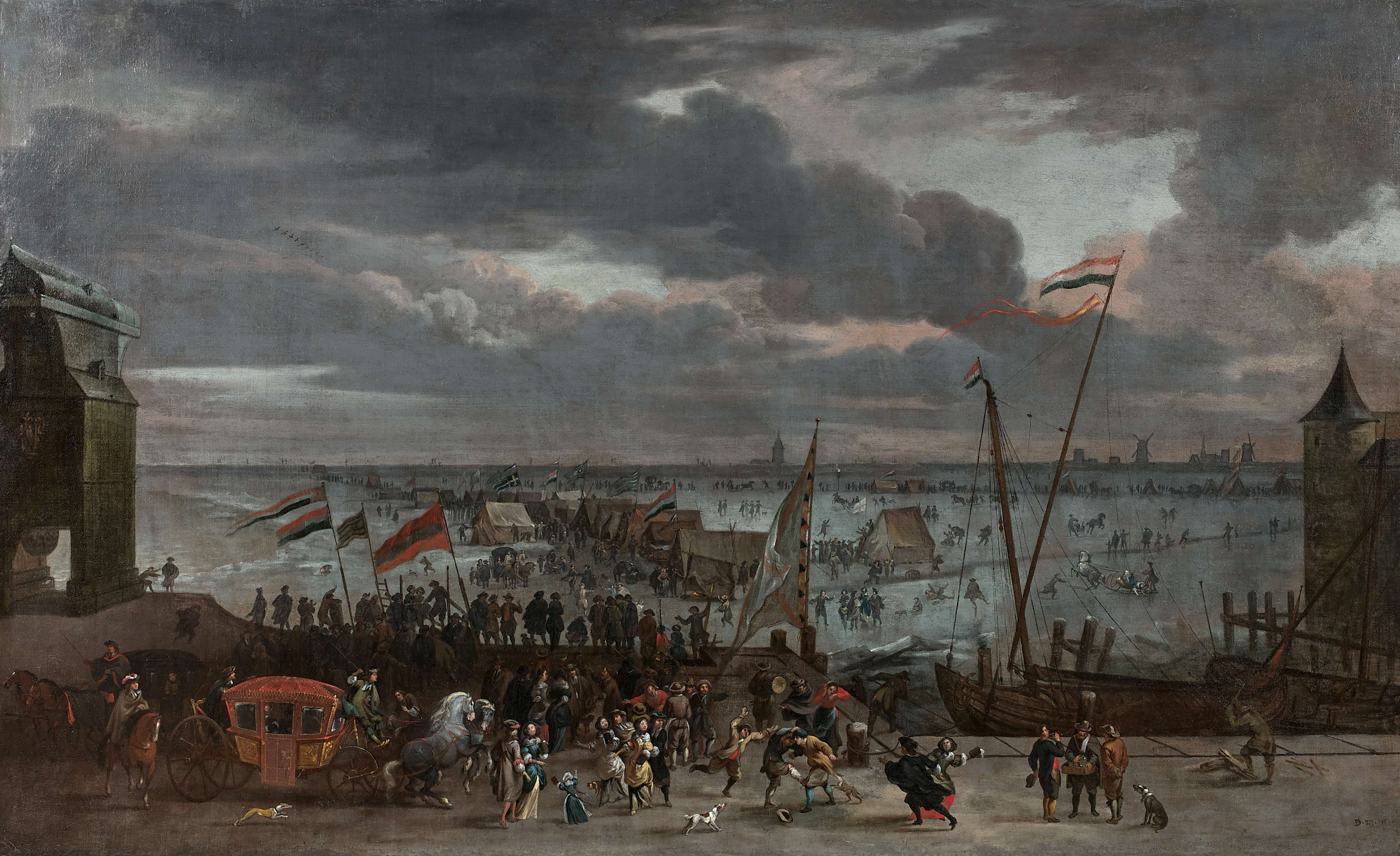
Figures in front of the frozen Scheldt in Antwerp

Erasmus de Bie was an accomplished painter of figures and often collaborated with other artists in Antwerp for whom he painted the staffage. This is documented in the papers of the Antwerp art dealers Forchondt, which mention two anonymous church interiors with figures painted by de Bie.

He may have produced Italianate landscapes set among Roman buildings and populated with many figures and animals reminiscent of the style of the group of genre painters active in Rome known as the Bamboccianti. A painting of the Campo Vaccino in Rome showing a myriad of figures on the Forum Romanum in the collection of the Victoria Art Gallery (Bath, Somerset) is attributed to him on the museum's website and on the National Inventory of Continental European paintings. The National Inventory of Continental European paintings records that there is an inscription on the front lower left reading 'ED · BIE - 1643', which is similar to Erasmus de Bie's known signature. However, it seems unlikely that a 14-year old who had not travelled outside Antwerp would have been able to paint a painting of this scale and scope. It is therefore possible that the painting was the work of Adriaen de Bie, a Flemish painter from Lier, Belgium who worked in Italy between 1614 and 1622. The work is attributed to Adriaen de Bie on the Art UK website and in various publications.
