= Boetius à Bolswert =

Frisian engraver

Boetius à Bolswert (also Boetius Adamsz Bolswert, Bodius; c. 1585, – late 1633) was a Flemish engraver of Frisian origin. In his time the paintings of Peter Paul Rubens called forth new endeavours by engravers to imitate or reproduce the breadth, density of mass and dynamic illumination of those works. Boetius Bolswert was an important figure in this movement, not least because he was the elder brother and instructor of the engraver Schelte à Bolswert, whose reproductions of Rubens's landscapes were most highly esteemed in their own right.

== Career ==
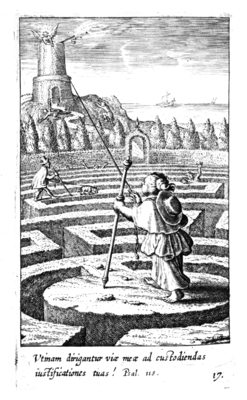
Pia Desideria's emblem XVII. Engraved by Boetius à Bolswert in 1624.

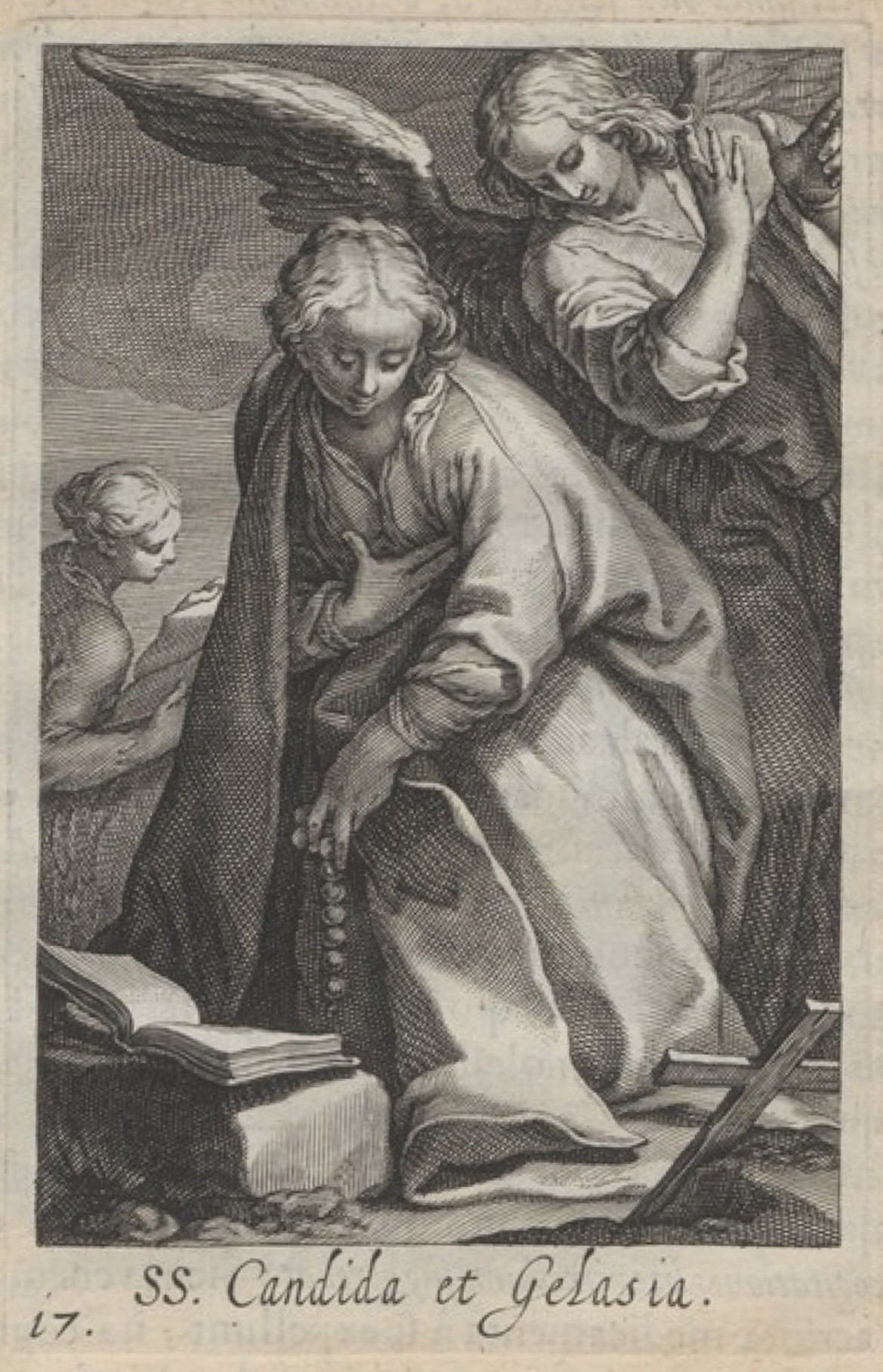
Saint Candida and Gelasia, from Sylva Anachoretica Ægypti Et Palæstinæ

The birthplace of the Bolswerts at the little town of Bolsward, Friesland, was confirmed by Cornelis de Bie in his Het Gulden Cabinet. Boetius came early in life to Holland, where he appears around 1610; he was then dwelling in Amsterdam, and sometimes also in Utrecht.

In 1610 he produced his four scenes of the Horrors of the Spanish War, after designs by David Vinckboons. Reproductions of large landscapes by Vinckboons and Gillis van Coninxloo III were among his early successes, employing a dense and diffuse technique, in a genre to which he later made transforming contributions. In 1615 and 1616 he was licensed by the Dutch States-General to engrave from the portraits of Michiel Jansz van Mierevelt, such as the portraits of Elizabeth and Frederik of Bohemia. In 1618 he depicted the ceremonial funeral-bed of the newly deceased Philipp Wilhelm, Prince of Orange.

However Bolswert's most notable collaboration in this period was with Abraham Bloemaert, after whom he produced various series. It is thought they worked closely, for Bolswert carefully imitated aspects of his graphic style, and has been described as his pupil. His 1611 series Pastorals using Bloemaert models shows the early fruits of that influence. Their collaboration in various works from 1612 on the theme of Saints and Hermits culminated in 1619 in Antwerp in the Sylva Anachoretica Ægypti Et Palæstinæ (The Hermit Woodland of Egypt and Palestine), a quarto (230mm) volume depicting imaginary portraits of 25 male and 25 female hermits of antiquity, with facing descriptive Latin texts, printed by Hendrick Aertssens. Dutch and French editions were reprinted in the same year. This was apparently commissioned by the Jesuit Heribert van Rosweijde (1569–1629), (founder of the project for the Acta Sanctorum taken up by the Bollandists), rector of the Jesuit college at Antwerp. Rosweyde dedicated the Bolswert work to his benefactor, Abbot Antoine de Wynghe of Liessies Abbey, Département Nord, France. It was evidently a companion-book to Rosweyde's major Latin work Vitae Patrum, Lives of the Fathers (biographies of early Church hermits), of 1615, a compilation from which was produced at Antwerp in 1619 by Jan van Gorcum.

At Antwerp between September 1620 and September 1621, Boetius Bolswert was admitted as free Master in the Guild of St Luke. Slightly before this, in January 1620, he became (as a good Roman Catholic and bachelor) a member of the Jesuit Sodality of Adult Bachelorhood; in September 1620 we find him in the office of Consultor within it, and in September 1622 as Assistant to the Prefects. Antwerp was then a leading centre of Counter-Reformation artistic and literary activity.

In 1624 he collaborated with the Brussels Jesuit Father Herman Hugo (1588–1629) in the production of 'the 17th century's most popular devotional book,' Pia Desideria – a work indicating three paths to salvation, through purification, illumination and union, an Emblem book which ran through many editions and versions. It consisted of a series of 45 emblems by Bolswert with accompanying verses by Hugo, subjects for meditation on the theme of spiritual love. Hugo had been teacher at the Jesuit College in Antwerp and rector of the Jesuit College in Brussels, and became army chaplain to Ambrogio Spinola in Spain. The 45 plates were reproduced in the last three volumes of the Emblems of Francis Quarles first published in 1635.

In 1627 Bolswert was in Brussels: from this city he gave, under the date of 1 May 1627 the dedication of his book, Duyfkens ende Willemynkens Pelgrimagie (Duyfkens and Willemynkens Pilgrimage). This little book (illustrated with his own engravings), which reveals him also to have been a writer, is seen in the later editions of 1631, 1638 and 1641, and in new (and re-cut) editions thereafter: it was a much-read Catholic devotional book and was translated into French. It described an allegorical voyage to Jerusalem by two sisters. Now some of the descriptions and narratives in it seem frankly ridiculous.

In 1639 Aertssens printed Bolswert's plates for the retelling of the mediaeval story of The Miracle of Amsterdam by Leonard Marius (Goesanus) (1588–1652), Roman Catholic priest at the Begijnhof. Some of the 16 full-page engraved plates are based on illustration designs attributed to Rubens.

Boetius à Bolswert soon established his engraving press in Holland, but he maintained a more extensive publishing house in Belgium: he now took his subjects from Rubens and from other Flemish painters, and himself attempted work in the field of composition. He took as his starting-point the narrow manner of Philip Galle and similar engravers; in Antwerp, through the influence of the great Rubens (who, without himself being an engraver, influenced others to achieve greater solidity of mass or volumes in engraved representations), he brought his art to a larger and broader grasp of Form than had previously been achieved in that medium. He died at Antwerp.

== Sources ==
- Friedrich Wilhelm Heinrich Hollstein, Dutch and Flemish etchings, engravings and woodcuts ca. 1450–1700 (1949– )
- (Ibid.) The new Hollstein. Dutch & Flemish etchings, engravings and woodcuts 1450–1700 (1993– )
- Anne Gerard Christiaan de Vries, De Nederlandsche Emblemata. Geschiedenis en Bibliographic tot de 18' eeuw (Amsterdam, 1899).
