= Jean Herman Voeller =

German government official

Jean Herman Voeller (1630–1710) was a government official in the Spanish Netherlands who served as secretary of state for German affairs from 1675 to 1710.

== Life ==
Voeller was born in Brussels and was baptised on 26 November 1630 in the Chapel Church there. He followed his father, Leonard Voeller, in government service. By letters patent of 15 March 1656, Governor General Archduke Leopold Wilhelm appointed him deputy secretary for German letters, under his father, with assurances that he would succeed to his father's office. After his father's retirement in 1675, he became secretary of state in his own right. On 18 September 1676, in Nijmegen, he married Marie-Elisabeth Creft (died 13 May 1691). They had a daughter, Jeanne Wendeline.

After the Battle of Ramillies, Voeller gave his support to the Grand Alliance. He died in Brussels on 3 May 1710 and was buried in the family vault in the Chapel Church.
