= Emanuel Sueyro =

Emanuel Sueyro Knight of Christ
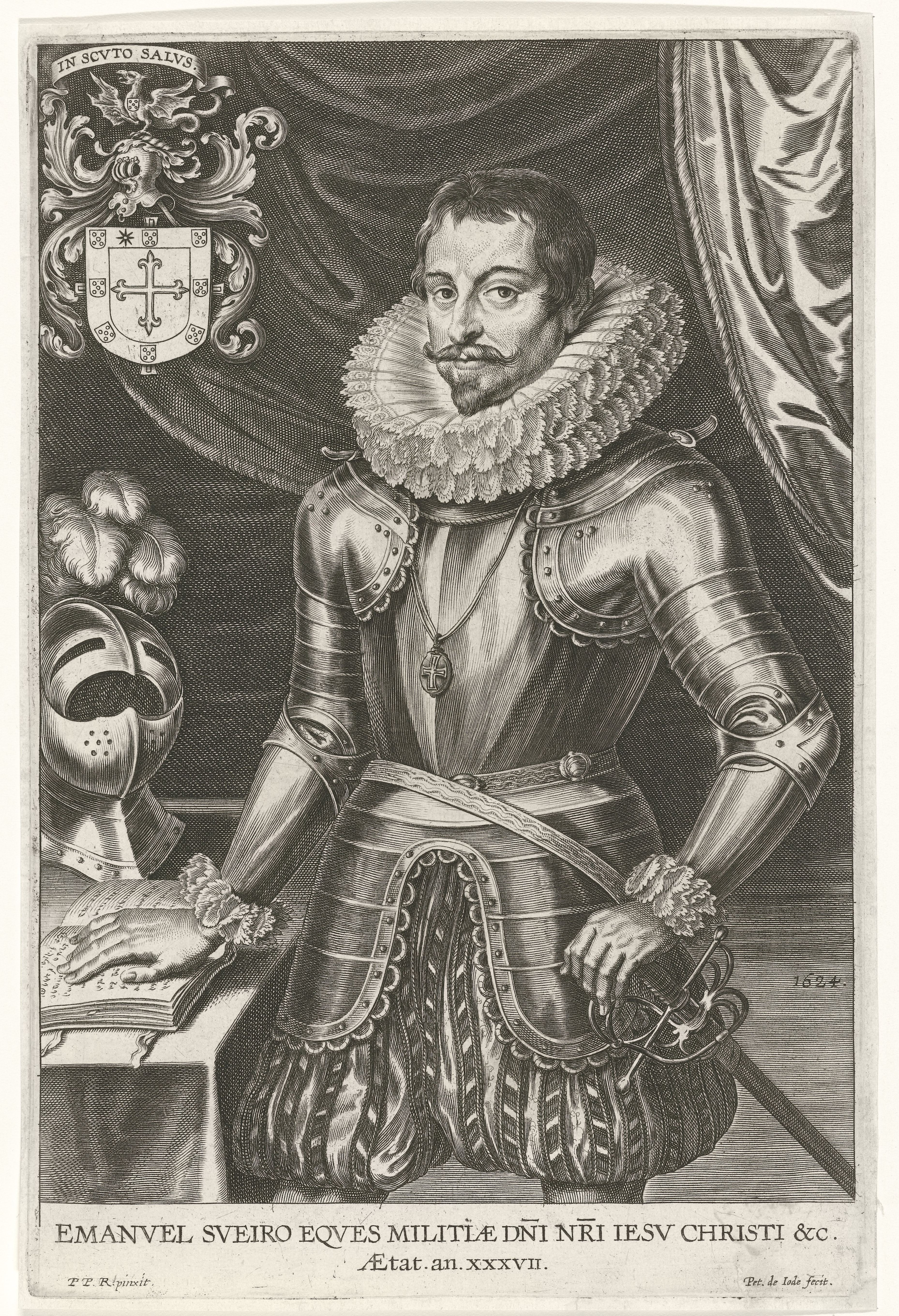
- Emanuel Sueyro in his 37th year, engraved by Pieter de Jode I after Peter Paul Rubens, 1624
- Born: February 20, 1587; Antwerp, Duchy of Brabant, Spanish Netherlands
- Died: 1629 (aged 41–42); Brussels, Duchy of Brabant, Spanish Netherlands
- Occupation: spymaster
- Writing career
- Language: Spanish
- Period: Baroque
- Genre: history
- Notable work: Anales de Flandes (1624)

Emanuel Sueyro (1587–1629), Lord of Voorde, Knight of Christ, was an intelligence agent and historian in the 17th-century Habsburg Netherlands.

== Life ==
Of Portuguese descent, Emanuel Sueyro was born and brought up in Antwerp. He translated classical and more recent Latin histories into Spanish, and wrote a two-part history of the Low Countries, Anales de Flandes (1624).

He was head of a secret intelligence network in the Habsburg Netherlands, reporting to Philip III of Spain. For this work he was awarded a knightship in the Order of Christ. He was lord of Voorde by purchase.

== Writings ==
=== Histories ===
- Descripcion breve del pais baxo (Antwerp, Gerard Wolsschaten, 1622)
- Anales de Flandes (Antwerp, Peter and Jan Bellerus, 1624), dedicated to Philip IV of Spain

=== Translations ===
- Tacitus, Las obras de C. Cornelio Tacito (Antwerp, heirs of Peter Bellerus, 1613), dedicated to Albert VII, Archduke of Austria
- Sallust, Obras de Caio Crispo Sallustio (Antwerp, G. Wolsschaten & H. Aerts for Jan Van Keerbergen, 1615), dedicated to Don Juan de Mendoza, Duke of the Infantado
- Herman Hugo, Sitio de Breda rendida a las armas del rey don Phelipe IV (Antwerp, Plantin office, 1627), dedicated to Ambrogio Spinola
