= Willem de Pannemaker =

Brussels tapestry weaver (c. 1510–1581)

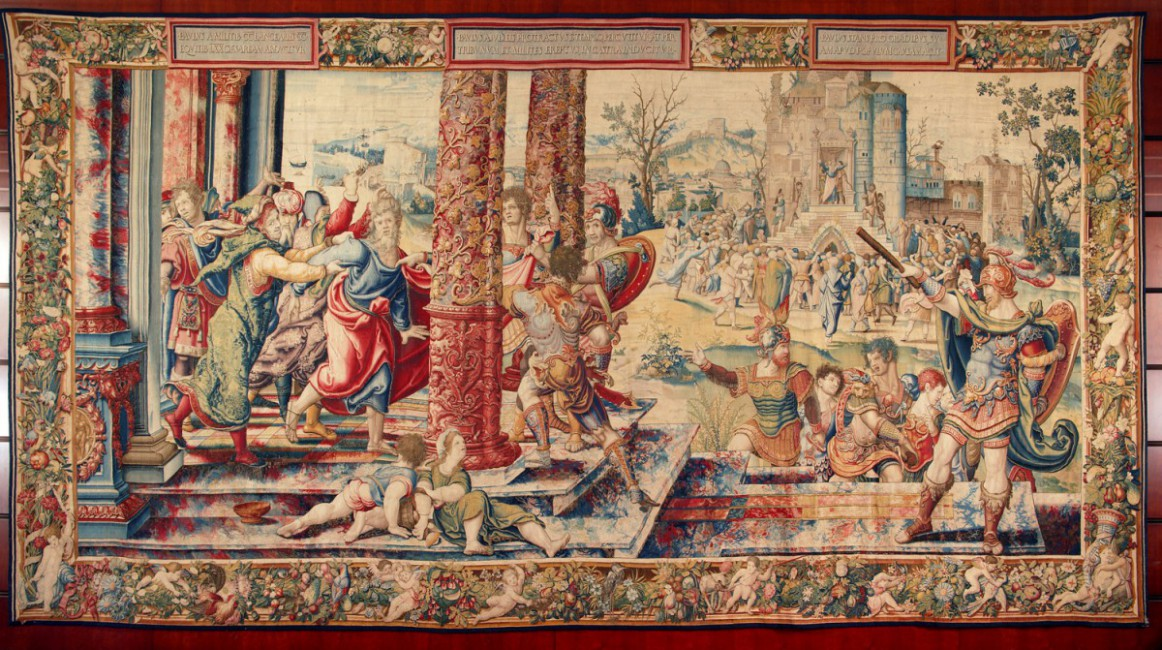
Made by Willem de Pannemaker, designed by Pieter Coecke van Aelst, The Arrest of Saint Paul, before 1546

Willem de Pannemaker (ca. 1510 – 1581), was a leading weaver of Brussels tapestry. He was the head of the Pannemaker tapestry workshop, was considered the greatest tapestry creator for his time, and is best known for his works for the Habsburgs.

== Biography ==
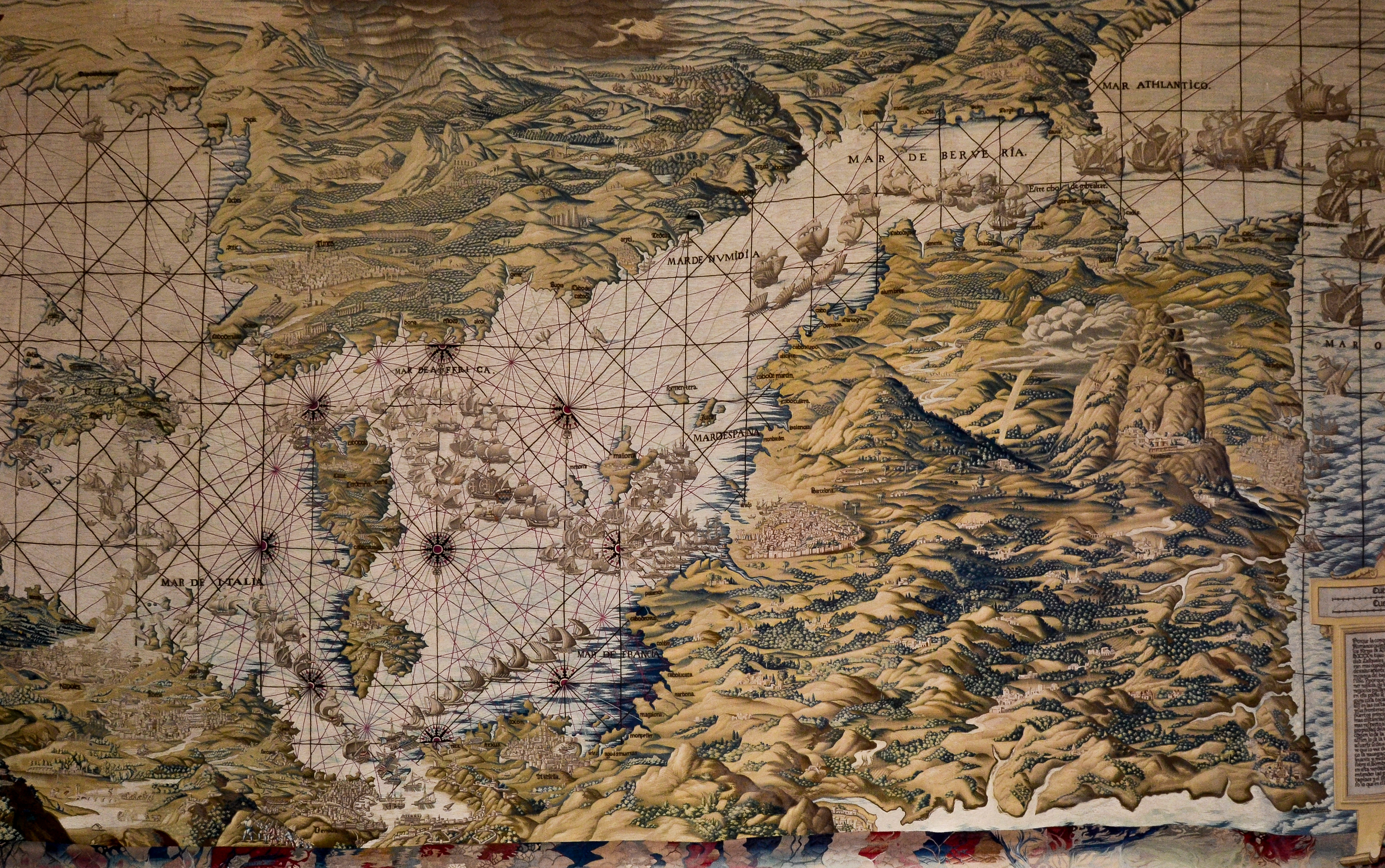
The first work in the series "Conquest of Tunis." This piece, known as "The Map of the Mediterranean Basin", includes the first depiction of a tornado in European media.

Pannemaker was born circa 1510 in Brussels. His father Pieter was head and most famous member of the Pannemaker family tapestry workshop. Trained by Pieter, Willem rose to become the most renowned tapestry weaver in contemporary Europe, many of his pieces being purchased by the Habsburg court during the 1540s and 1560s. He derived particular artistic inspiration from the works of Raphael. One of his best-known pieces is the Conquest of Tunis. He died in 1581.

=== Known works ===
- Conquest of Tunis - Created after designs by Jan Cornelisz Vermeyen depicting the 1535 Conquest of Tunis by Charles V. It is notable for including one of the first European depictions of a tornado. Pannemaker was entrusted with creating the tapestries in 1548 for the court of Charles V, and completed the 8-part series in 1554. The series was later considered to be the most important piece of art within the court shortly after its creation.

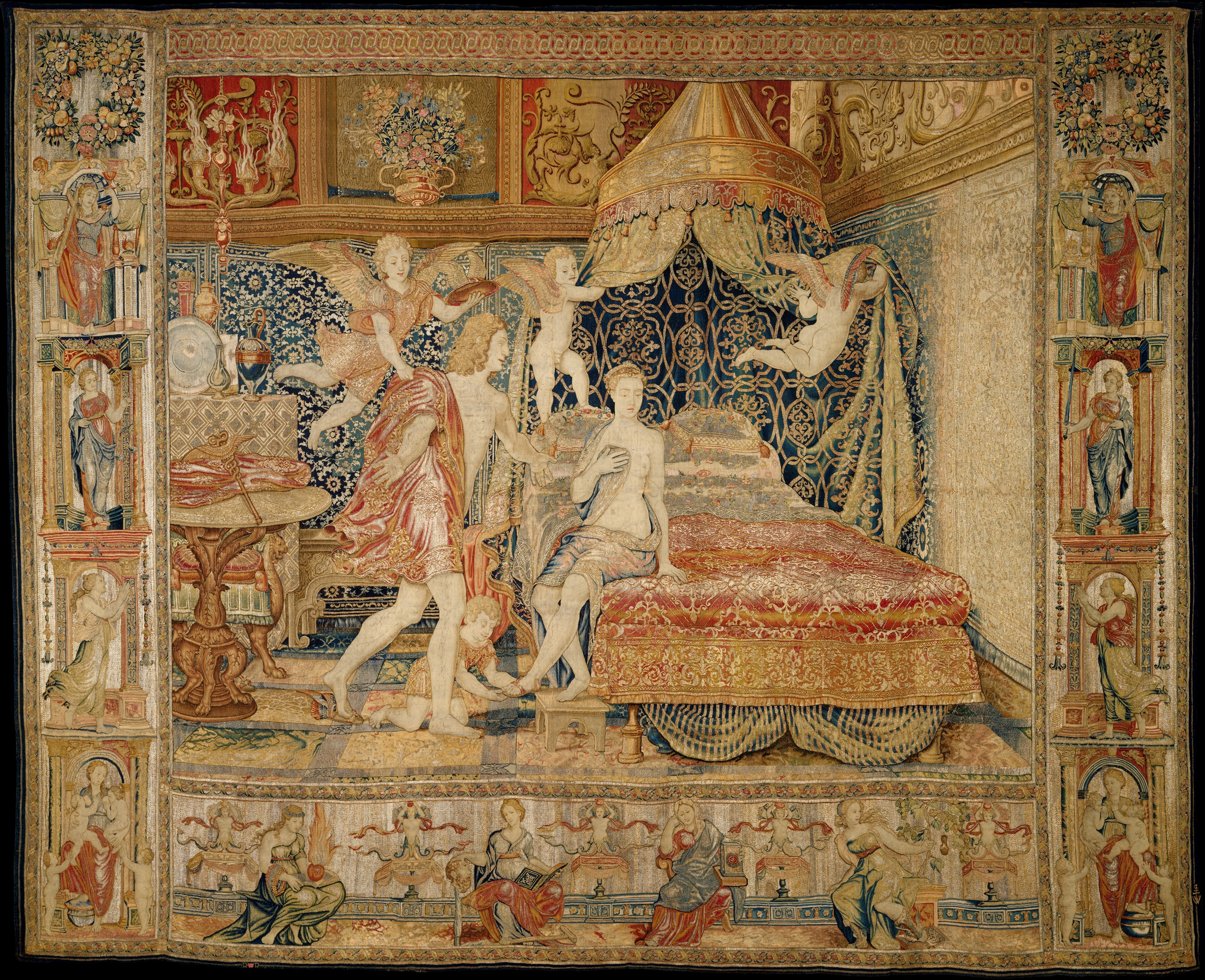
"The Bridal Chamber of Herse", from The Wedding of Mercury series. Design attributed to Giovanni Battista Lodi da Cremona (Italian, active 1540–52) after a print by Giovanni Jacopo Caraglio (Italian, Parma or Verona ca. 1500/1505–1565 Krakow. Border design attributed to Giovanni Francesco Penni (Italian, Florence ca. 1496–after 1528 Naples).

- The Wedding of Mercury - This 8-part series is currently the only surviving series that depicts the myth of Mercury and Herse as mentioned in the Metamorphoses by Ovid.
- The Months of Lucas - The series is named after Lucas van Leyden, a sixteenth-century artist believed to have designed it. It depicts scenes from the out-of-doors lives of nobles and peasants during the twelve months in twelve pieces.
- Christ Appearing to Mary Magdalene (Noli Me Tangere) - Created between 1540/45. The design is likely from either Michiel Coxcie or Giovanni Battista Lodi da Cremona.
