= Jan Cornelisz Vermeyen =

Dutch painter, printmaker, & tapestry designer (c. 1504–1559)

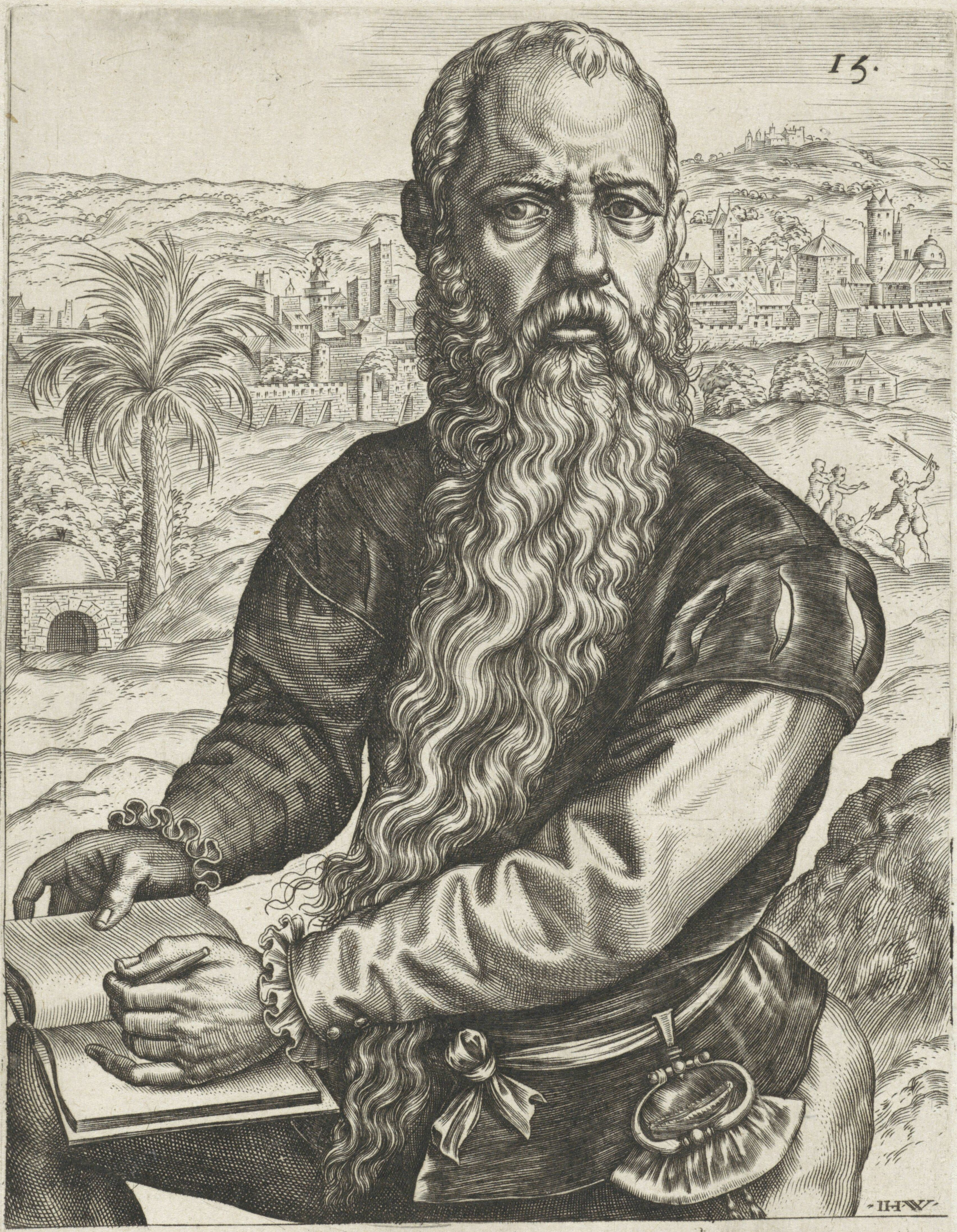
Portrait of Jan Vermeyen by Johannes Wierix

Jan Cornelisz. Vermeyen, also known as Juan del Mayo (c. 1503 – 1559) was a Dutch painter, printmaker and tapestry designer. He is known for his portraits, history scenes and genre subjects. He worked in Mechelen and elsewhere, chiefly as a portraitist for the governors of the Habsburg Netherlands, Archduchess Margaret of Austria and Mary of Hungary. He also served the Emperor Charles V whom he accompanied on his military campaign to Tunis of 1535.

== Life ==
His epitath in the church where he was buried stated that he was born in Beverwijk, which is a village about 10 kilometres north of Haarlem (now in the Netherlands). In his will made on 24 September 1559 (rediscovered only in 1998), he declared that he was at the time 55 years old. This means he was born around 1503.

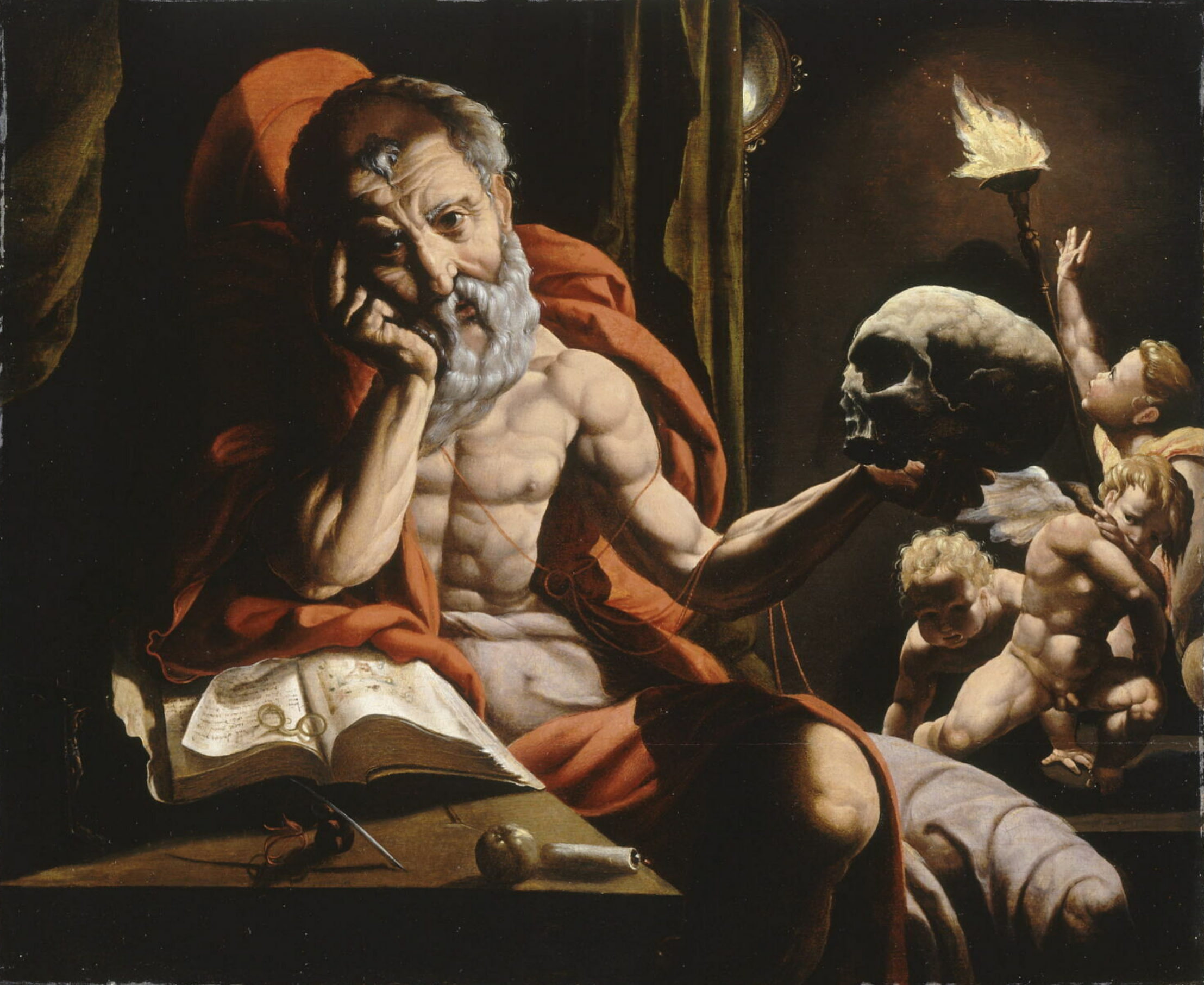
Saint Jerome Meditating

It is not clear with whom he trained. There are artistic similarities in his early work with that of the Dutch painter Jan van Scorel and the Flemish painter Jan Gossaert. Gossaert and his pupil van Scorel were among the first painters of the Habsburg Netherlands to visit Italy and Rome. They launched in northern Europe a new painting style known as Romanism, which combined elements of Italian Renaissance painting and the Northern painting tradition. Flemish artist biographer Karel van Mander wrote in Het Schilder-boeck published in 1604 that Vermeyen and Jan van Scorel were friends and business partners.

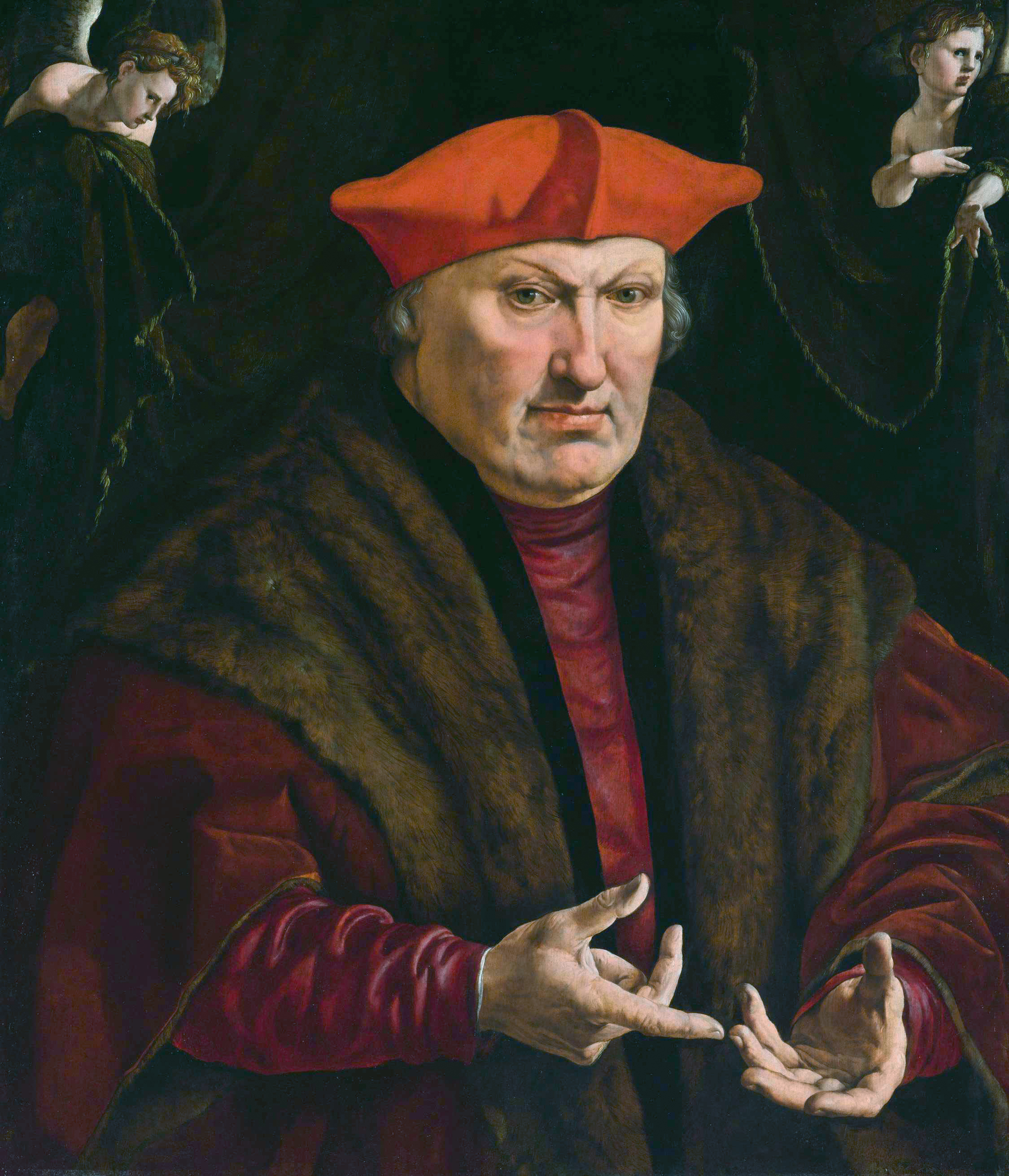
Portrait of Erard de la Marck

Around 1525 Vermeyen became court painter to Archduchess Margaret of Austria, who was governor of the Habsburg Netherlands and an aunt of Holy Roman Emperor Charles V. Her court was based in Mechelen. In 1529 he was paid an annual stipend of 100 Flemish pounds for these services. In the same year he accompanied the Archduchess to Cambrai on the occasion of the signing ceremony of the Treaty of Cambrai (the so-called 'Ladies' Peace'), that ended the French involvement in the War of the League of Cognac between the French king Francis I and the Spanish Habsburg emperor Charles V. He travelled with the Archduchess to Augsburg and Innsbruck from 25 May to 27 October 1530. During the trip he painted portraits of various members of the Imperial Family and other prominent persons. The Archduchess died in December 1530. Three years later, he claimed from her estate reimbursement for the materials used for 19 portraits which he had painted for the Archduchess. Between 1530 and 1533 he produced some works for Margaret’s successor, Mary of Hungary, the sister of Charles V, but he was probably not in her regular employ.

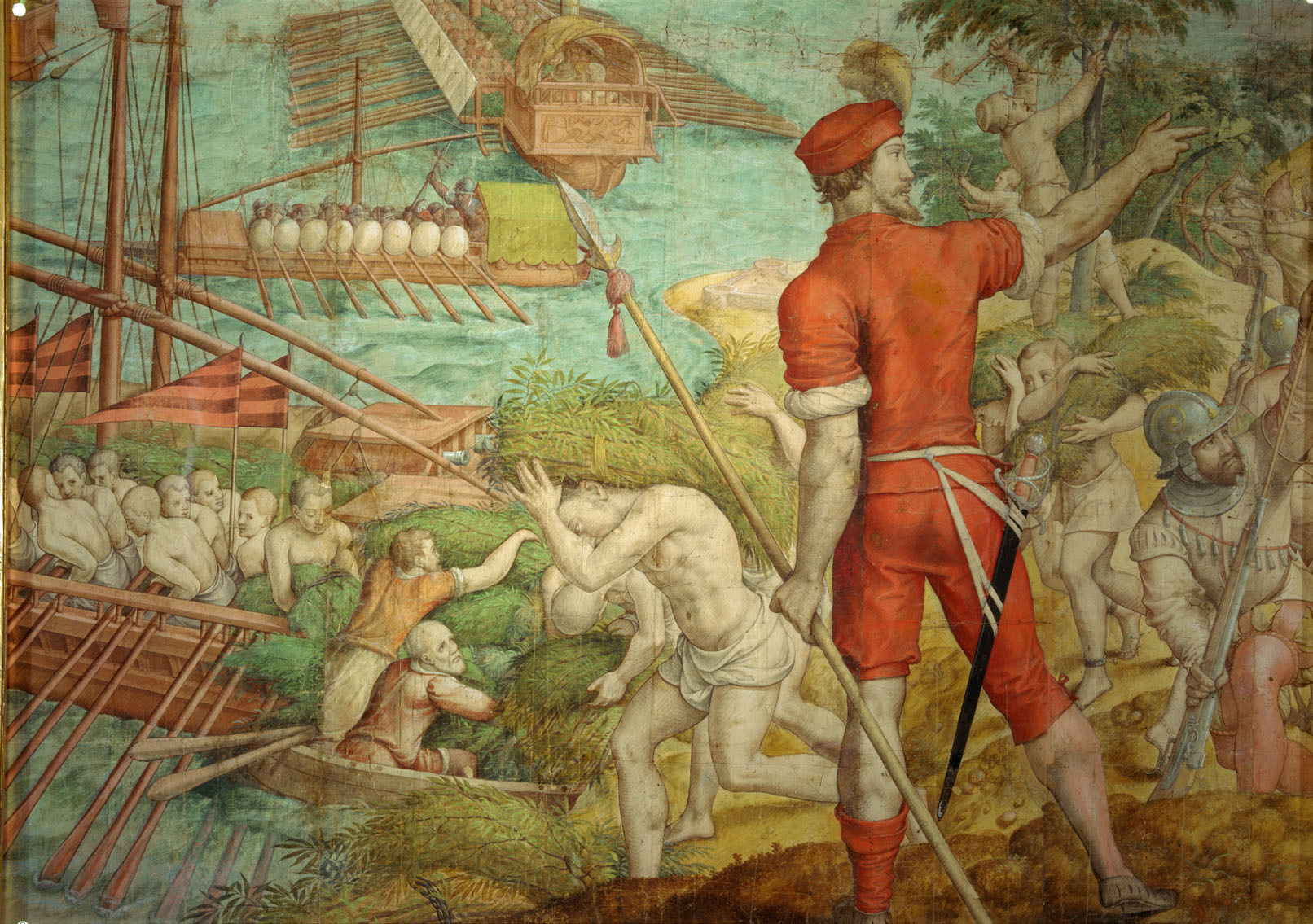
The siege of the fortress of La Goletta, tapestry cartoon

Vermeyen likely moved to Spain in 1534 and in any case before 8 June 1534 as he produced a large drawing of a bullfight held on that day in Avila. In 1535 he accompanied Emperor Charles V when he set off from Barcelona on his military campaign for the Conquest of Tunis. This journey supplied him with scenes for later works, including tapestries designed in 1545/48 for Mary of Austria, the regent of Hungary and later governor of the Habsburg Netherlands. He "designed a set of twelve tapestries commemorating scenes from the campaign that would travel with Charles wherever he went, to bear witness to this triumph." Ten cartoons for the tapestries are in the collection of the Kunsthistorisches Museum in Vienna. The tapestries were woven between 1551 and 1553 in the Brussels workshop of Willem Pannemaker. In 1536 and 1538 the council of Brabant, the highest law court in the historic Duchy of Brabant, granted him the exclusive rights to publish prints of the Tunis campaign. Vermeyen painted in Tunis a portrait of the Hafsid King of Tunis Moulay Hassan, whom Charles V had re-instated on his throne after liberating the city of the pirate Hayreddin Barbarossa. The portrait was later copied by Rubens. Vermeyen was honored for his career in the service of the Empetor Charles V. In 1538 he was referred to as ‘painter to His Royal Majesty'.

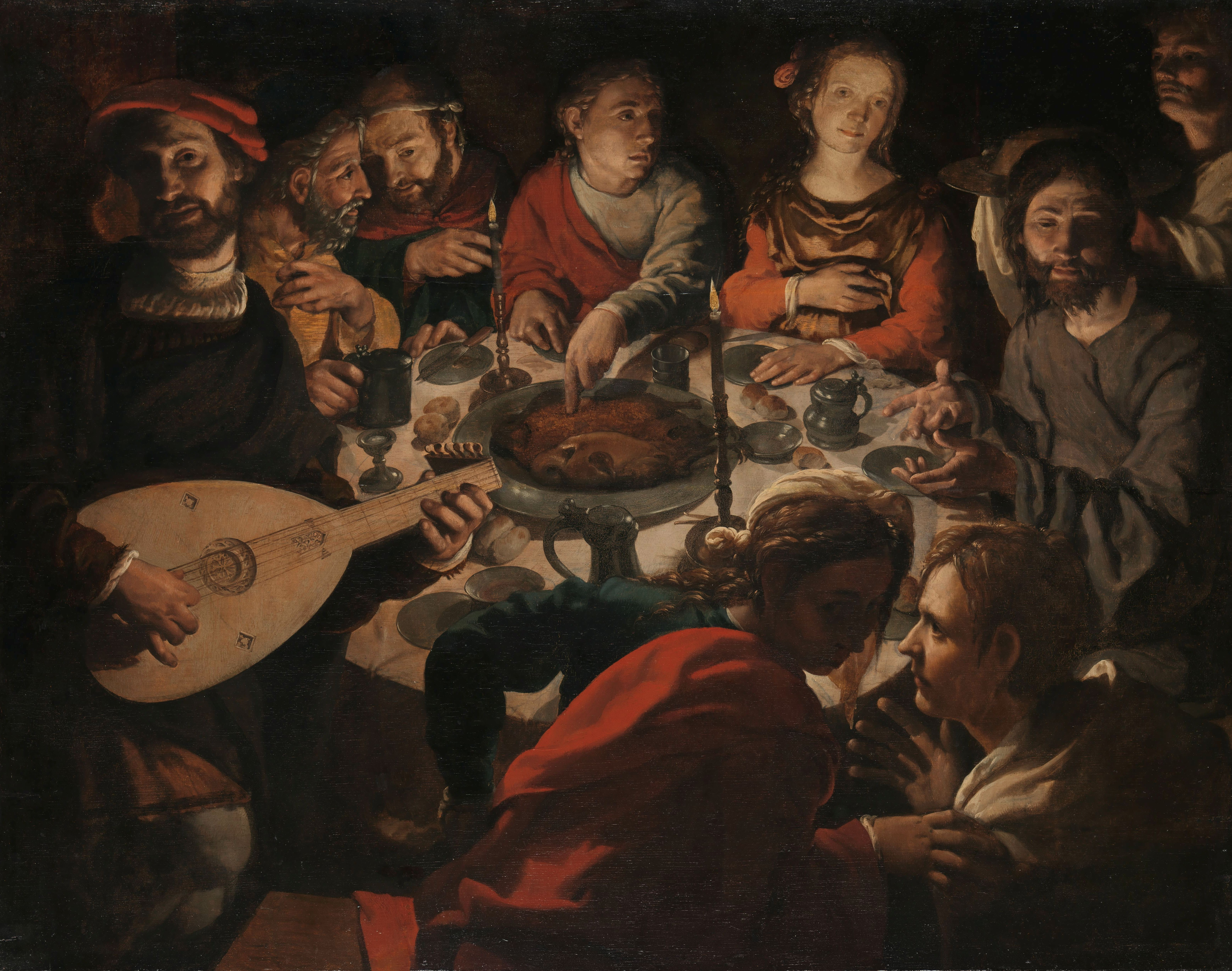
The calling of St John during the marriage at Cana

It is possible that Vermeyen stayed in Italy in late 1535 and early 1536. In 1539 he was in Spain as he executed a signed and dated work called Game of Canes in Toledo in that year. He may have traveled with Charles V's retinue back to the Habsburg Netherlands, where he made a colored drawing of Charles's Punishment of Ghent. He remained in the Habsburg Netherlands where he stayed in Mechelen and Brussels. There is no information on his first marriage and it is assumed that he was already a widower before he left for Spain in 1534. He likely married his second wife, Jida (or Ida) de Neve, in Brussels after his return to the Habsburg Netherlands in 1540. His wife was the daughter of the painter Jan de Neve from Mechelen. Van Mander recounts that Jida de Neve had been born with six fingers on each hand and that the extra fingers had been amputated. Their son Hans or Jan Vermeyen (before 1559-1606) became a master goldsmith in Antwerp in 1590 and was later employed by Emperor Rudolf II. Payments for paintings in the Church of the Abbey of St Vaast in Arras are documented from 1548 until 1561, two years after his death, to his widow. He worked with Jan van Scorel to reclaim the Zijpe area in North Holland. He died in 1559 in Brussels where he was buried in the Church of St. Gaugericus, which contained his epitaph and paintings by him. The church was demolished in 1799 during the French occupation.

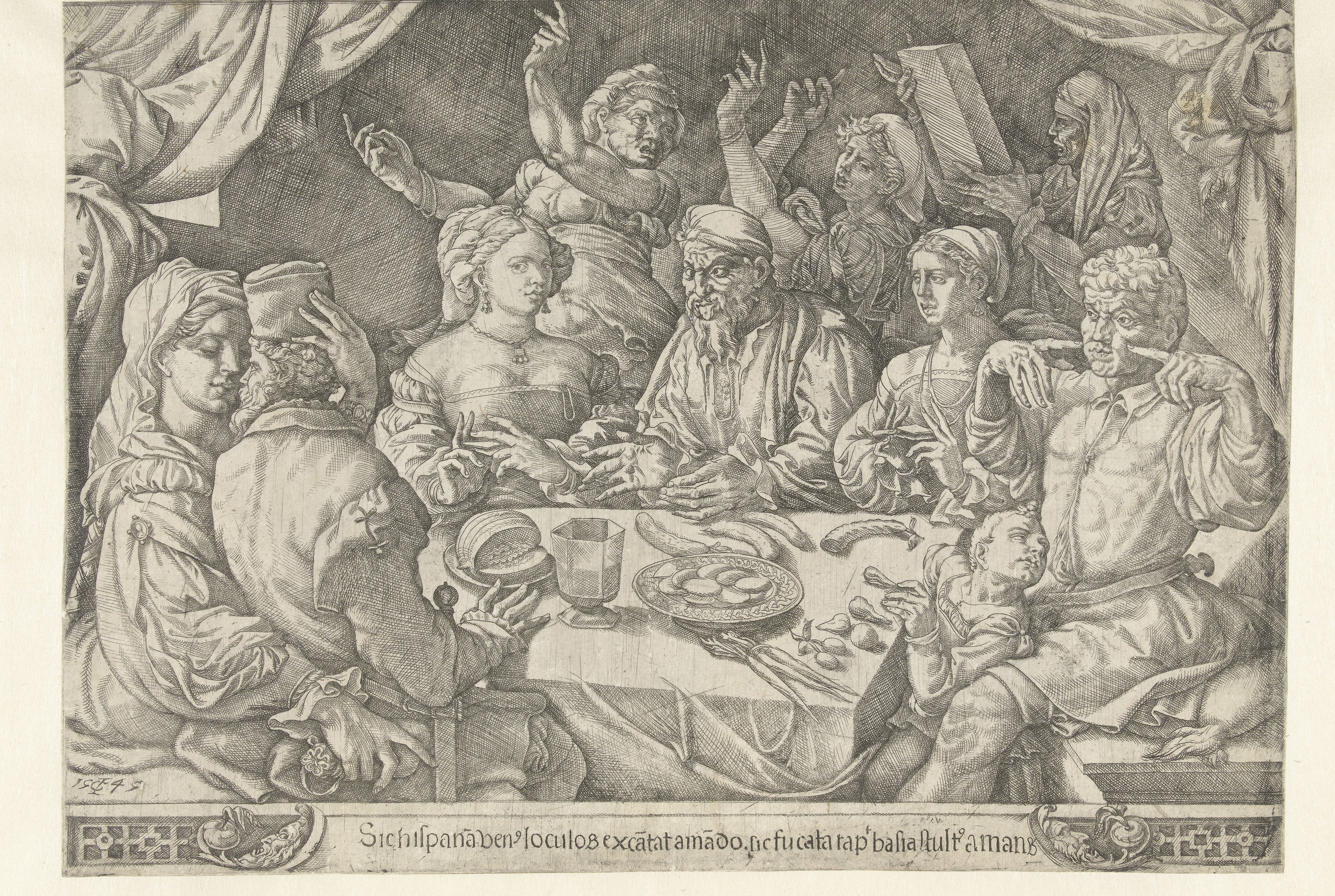
Spanish brothel, etching

His portrait was engraved by Johannes Wierix for Dominicus Lampsonius' Pictorum aliquot celebrium Germaniae inferioris effigies (literal translation: Effigies of some celebrated painters of Lower Germany) published in 1572. Vermeyen was nicknamed 'Jan met den Baard' (Jan with the Beard) and 'Barbalonga' (Long-beard) because of his meter-long beard.

== Work ==
Much of his painterly output was destroyed during the iconoclastic fury of the Beeldenstorm of 1566, a period during which Protestant crowds destroyed the internal furnishings of churches in the Habsburg Netherlands. Only a few of his pictures are signed. As a result, determining the scope of his surviving oeuvre has been difficult. Some of his works are only known through workshop copies. Many portraits are attributed to him, of which some depict members of the Emperor's family and other prominent personalities. He was one of the leading portrait artists of his time. He produced very expressive and lively character sketches in his portraits in which the eloquent hand gestures of the sitters accentuate their personality traits. He also created a number of paintings depicting nocturnal religious scenes such as The calling of St John during the marriage at Cana.

Vermeyen created about 20 etchings, which are generally signed and often dated. The subject matter includes the campaign in Tunis, portraits, history and genre scenes. The persons in the etchings are often half-figures depicted from close-up, which accentuates their facial expressions.

His work was influenced not only by Gossaert and van Scorel, but also by Bernard van Orley.
