= Margaret of the Mother of God =

Dutch Discalced Carmelite lay sister

- Margriet van de Moeder Gods

Personal life
- Born: Margriet van Noort; 1587 Farmsum, Lordship of Groningen, Habsburg Netherlands
- Died: 1646 (aged 58–59) Brussels, Duchy of Brabant, Spanish Netherlands
- Notable work: Spiritual autobiography

Religious life
- Religion: Christianity
- Order: Discalced Carmelite
- Monastic name: Margarita a Matre Dei
- Profession: 1609

Senior posting
- Post: Lay sister

Margaret of the Mother of God (Dutch: Margriet van de Moeder Gods, French: Marguerite de la Mère de Dieu, Latin: Magarita a Matre Dei), born Margriet van Noort, 1587 – 1646) was a Dutch Discalced Carmelite lay sister in the Brussels Carmel.

== Life ==
Margriet van Noort was born in Farmsum, in the far north of the Low Countries, in 1587. Her parents were Sebastian van Noort, an officer in the Army of Flanders, and Gertruda Bernaerts. On 8 December 1607 she was admitted to the Brussels Carmel by the foundress of the convent, the Venerable Ana de Jesús, becoming a lay sister in 1609 and taking the name Margaret of the Mother of God. She died there in 1646, aged 59.

Margaret is reputed to have been a prophet and wonderworker. She recorded her spiritual experiences and reflections in an autobiography. An English translation was published in 2015 under the title Spiritual Writings of Sister Margaret of the Mother of God (1635-1643).
