= Leonard Voeller =

Leonard Voeller (1590–1675) was a government official in the Habsburg Netherlands who from 1642 to 1675 served as secretary of state for German affairs.

== Life ==
Voeller was born in Munich on 28 February 1590, the son of Johann Voeller, who came to work as an official in the forestry administration of the Duchy of Jülich for Wolfgang Wilhelm, Count Palatine of Neuburg. Leonard likewise began his career in Neuburg's service, but at some point transferred to the service of Isabella Clara Eugenia.

On 29 January 1629, he married Johanna Smidt in Cologne. The family lived in a house that he had bought in the Wolstraat in Brussels, where they had four children: Jean Herman, Martin, Charles Albert (who died young), and Marie Anne Agnès (who died on 21 February 1721).

Voeller was sent to Spain in 1632 to accompany Cardinal-Infante Ferdinand of Austria on his planned journey to Brussels, which was completed only in 1634. On 17 June 1642 he was appointed secretary of state for German letters, responsible for the governor general's correspondence with princes and governments of the Holy Roman Empire and Scandinavia. In 1656, he received assurances that his son would be appointed in succession to him. He only retired in 1675.

Voeller died in Brussels on 13 November 1675 and was buried in a tomb in the Chapel Church in that city. His epitaph recorded that he had held his office for thirty-three years, died in his eighties, and was buried alongside his wife.
