= Frederick de Marselaer =

Mayor of Brussels

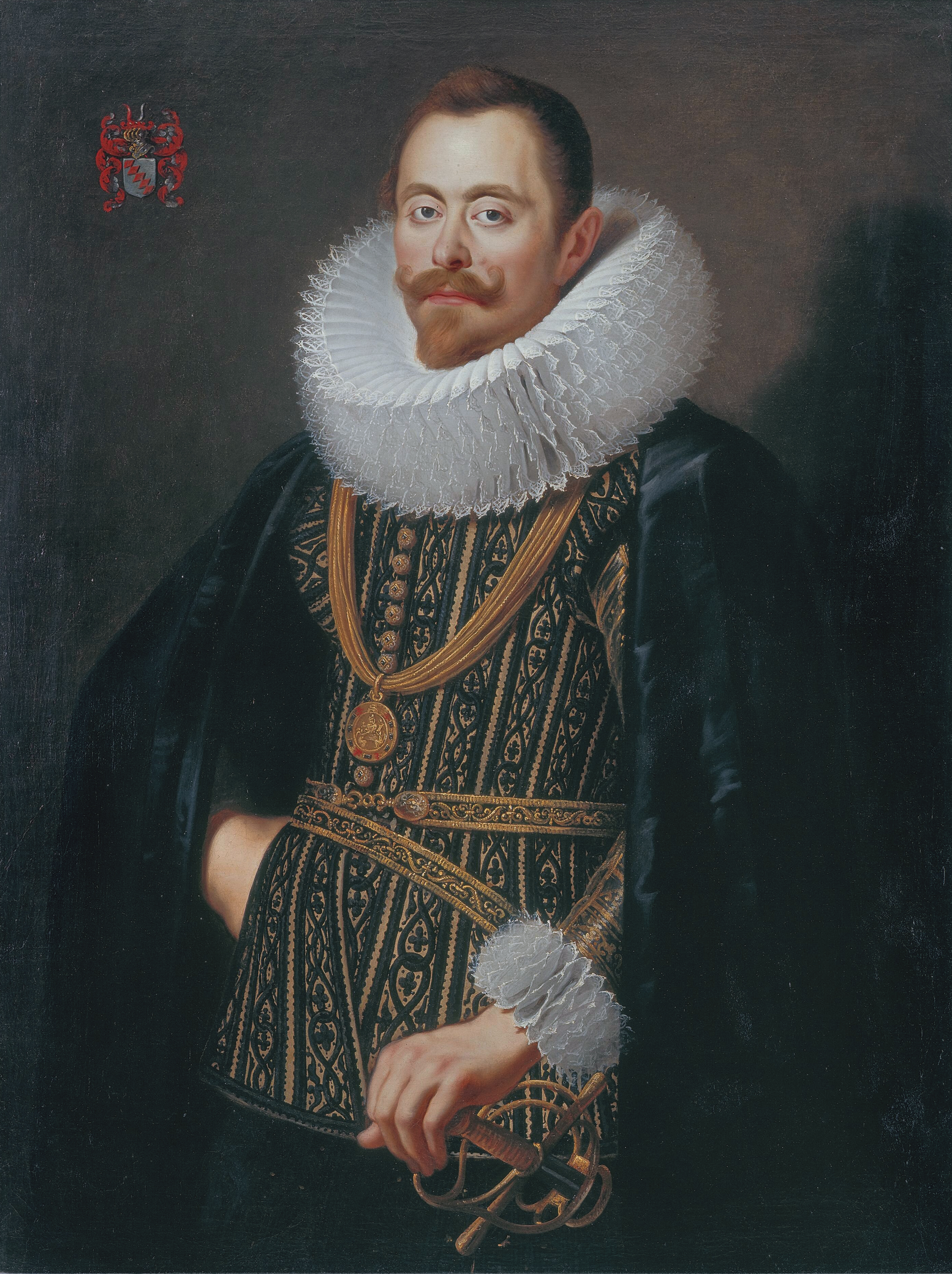
Portrait of Frederick de Marselaer by Gaspar de Crayer (c.1625–1630)

Frederick de Marselaer (1584–1670) was a mayor of Brussels and the author of a treatise on diplomacy.

== Life ==
Marselaer was born in the city of Antwerp in 1584. He studied Law at the University of Leuven, graduating on 23 March 1611, and then made a tour of Italy.

In 1613 he was admitted to the Roodenbeke Lineage, one of the Seven Noble Houses of Brussels, making him a patrician of the city of Brussels. Between 1614 and 1659 he served ten terms as an alderman of Brussels, and between 1623 and 1651 seven terms as mayor.

In 1617 he was knighted, and in 1622 he organized local levies to repulse Dutch raiders from Vilvoorde. In 1659 he was raised to the rank of baron.

The first edition of his treatise on ambassadors was published in 1618, under the title Khpykeion, sive legationum insigne. It went into a second edition in 1626 under the title Legatus libri duo, and further editions under this title in 1644, 1663 and 1666.

Marselaer died on 7 November 1670.

== Works ==
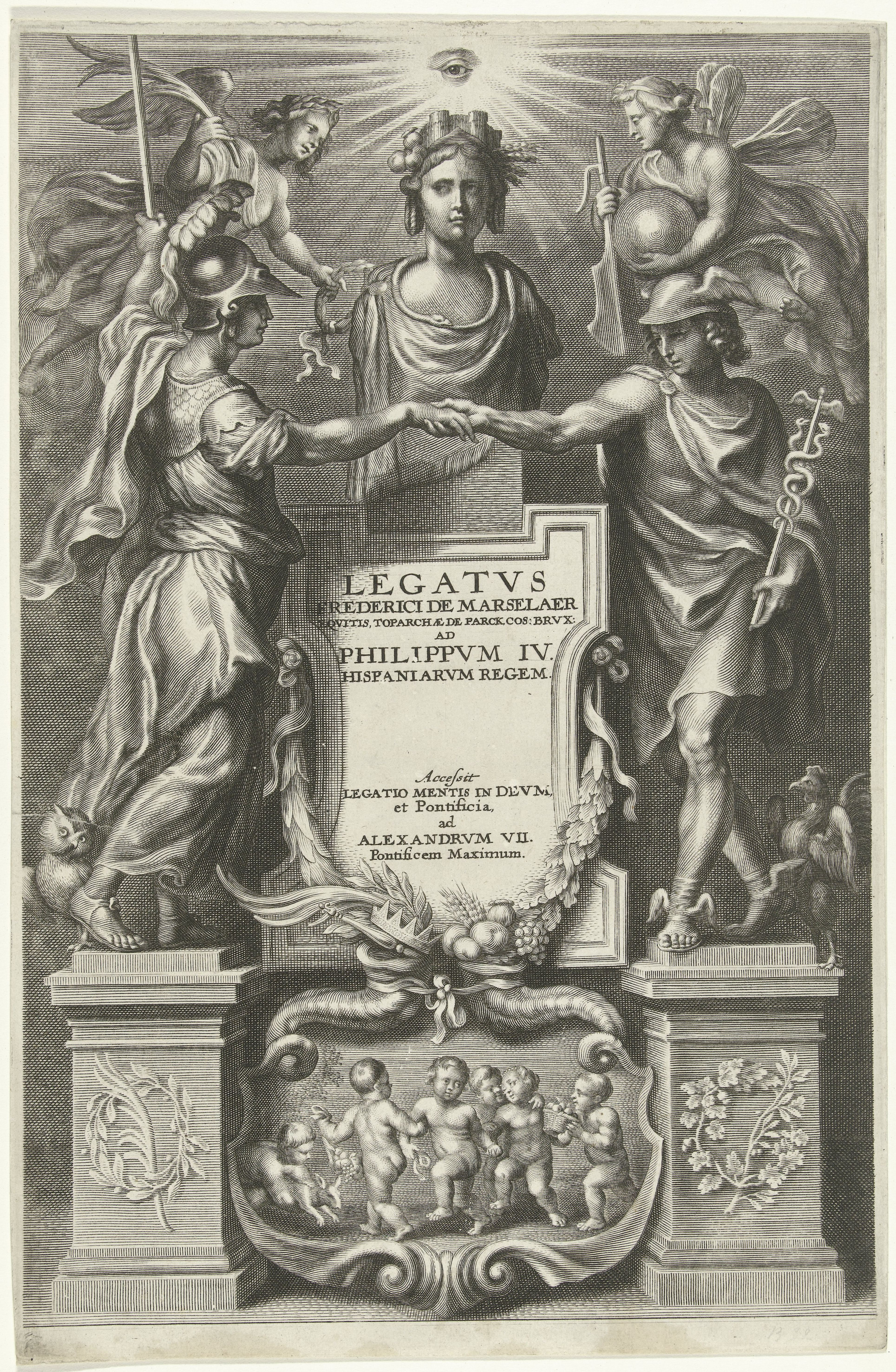
Title page of Frederick de Marselaer's Legatus (1666), engraved by Cornelis Galle the Younger after a design by Peter Paul Rubens

- Khpykeion, sive legationum insigne (Antwerp, 1618). Available on Google Books.
  - Legatus libri duo (Antwerp, 1626). Available on Google Books.
  - Legatus, libri duo (Amsterdam, 1644). Available on Google Books.
  - Legatus, libri duo (Weimar, 1663). Available on Google Books.
  - Legatus (Antwerp, 1666). Available on Google Books.
