= Gillis II Coignet =

Flemish history and landscape painter

Gillis II Coignet (September 1586 in Antwerp – after 1641 in Antwerp) was a Flemish history and landscape painter.

Gillis II was the son of Jacob Coignet (III) and Hester van Beringen. He married Magdalena van der Beken on 29 September 1609. He had at least ten children: Jacob, Joanna, Anna, Egidius, Hester, Barbara, Michiel, Maria, Clemidya, Gulielmus. He joined the Guild of St. Luke in 1607 as a master's son. He was active until at least 1641/42.

Gillis' style resembles that of Gillis van Coninxloo and the Frankenthal school. Gillis' son Jacob was also a painter.

== Works ==
Name	Dates	Years
Orpheus plays for the animals, oil on copper, diameter 39,5 cm, Koninklijk Museum voor Schone Kunsten Brussel, inv. 11240 (90).		
Rural road with river, 1621, pen on parchment, verkoop P. de Boer, Amsterdam.		1934
Adam and Eve, 37,5 x 26 cm, also ascribed to C.C. van Haarlem, Sotheby's.	20 April	1977
Landscape with trees, panel, 20 x 51 cm, Sotheby Parke Bernet, London.	10 December	1980
Riverine landscape, panel, 16 x 32 cm, Sotheby Parke Bernet, London.	16 February	1983
Die Allegorie des wassers, oil on copper, 26 x 34,5 cm, also ascribed to Jan van Kessel, Dorotheum, Wien.	6 May	1996
(1) Sint-Francis and the animals, oil on copper, 42,5 x 51 cm, Campo Vlaamse Kaai, Antwerpen.	10–11 December	1996
(2) The temptation in the Garden of Eden, oil on copper, 42,5 x 51 cm, Phillips, London together with (1).	10 December 1991	1996
Riverine landscape with trees (ascribed), oil on copper, 17,5 x 22,6 cm, De Vuyst.		2015

== Sources ==
- Meskens, Ad (1998). Familia Universalis: Coignet. Royal Museum of Fine Arts, Antwerp.
- Rombouts, Philip Felix; van Lerius, Theodoor (1874). De liggeren en andere historische archieven der Antwerpsche Sint Lucasgilde. Baggerman.
