= Philippe d'Outreman =

Jesuit writer from Valenciennes, Habsburg Netherlands (1585–1652)

Philippe d'Outreman (28 April 1585 – 16 May 1652) was a Jesuit writer from Valenciennes, then in the County of Hainaut, Habsburg Netherlands.

He was the son of Henri d'Outreman, lord of Rombies and member of the town government of Valenciennes. His brother Pierre was also a member of the Society of Jesus and a religious writer.

In 1607, Philippe d'Outreman joined the Jesuit novitiate in Tournai. He was ordained priest in 1616. He resided in several towns in the south of the Low Countries, such as Lille, Maubeuge and Cambrai.

== Le pédagogue chrétien ==
Philippe d'Outreman is best known as the author of Le pédagogue chrétien, a book first published in Saint-Omer in 1622 as Le vrai chrétien catholique. The book illustrates Catholic doctrine by providing a large number of exempla. It focusses on the different types of sins, good works, sacraments and the cult of saints. The book was initially written to support catechism teachers, but gradually also reached wider audiences.

Le pédagogue chrétien was issued over a hundred times. The author revised his text several times during his life, leading to new editions in Mons, Saint-Omer and Lille, including an extended Nouveau pédagogue chrétien (2 volumes, 1645–1646). Until after 1740, many new editions were printed in Paris, Lyon, Rouen and other French-speaking towns. In 1854 another revised edition was printed in Paris.

The book was translated into English (Saint-Omer, 1622), Latin (Luxembourg, 1629), Dutch (Antwerp, 1637 and 1646), German (Cologne, 1664), Arab (1738, 1852 und 1874) and Bisaya (Manila, 1751). Most of these translations were reissued frequently until the first half of the 18th century.
