= Adriaen de Bie =

Flemish painter (1593–1668)

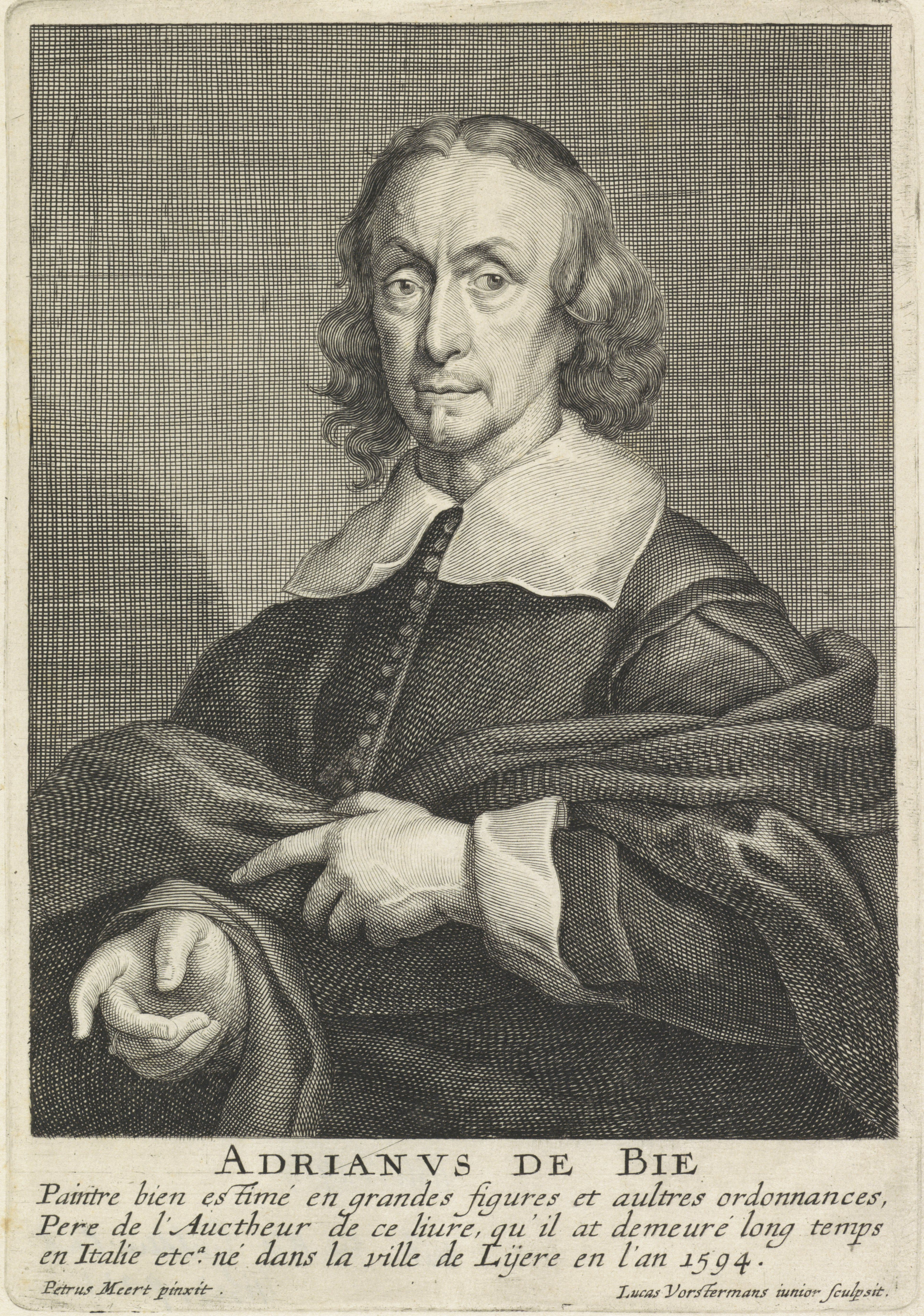
Portrait of de Bie by Lucas Vorsterman II after design by Pieter Meert

Adriaen de Bie (3 October 1593 – 20 October 1668) was a Flemish painter, who is known for portraits, biblical scenes for churches and Italianate landscapes. In his youth he travelled to Paris and resided for a long period in Italy. He trained in Antwerp and was the father of the poet and artist biographer Cornelis de Bie.

== Life ==
De Bie was born in Lier. His son Cornelis de Bie reports that he studied painting in Antwerp under the artist Wouter Abts. This information is not confirmed by the Liggeren, the records of Antwerp's Guild of Saint Luke. In 1611 he travelled to Paris where he lived for two years with his teacher the Flemish painter Rudolph Schoof, who was court painter of Louis XIII.

From Paris he continued in 1614 on to Rome where he stayed for six years. It is possible that around 1620 he shared in Rome lodgings with the Dutch painter Hendrick ter Brugghen. He then spent three years visiting important Italian cities. His patrons included Cardinals, for whom he made paintings on panel as well as on precious metals such as gold and silver plates and on porphyry and jasper.

He returned to Lier in 1623. He painted portraits and decorations for the St. Gummarus church above the altar of St. Eligius, the patron saint of goldsmiths.

He died in Lier on 20 October 1668.

== Work ==
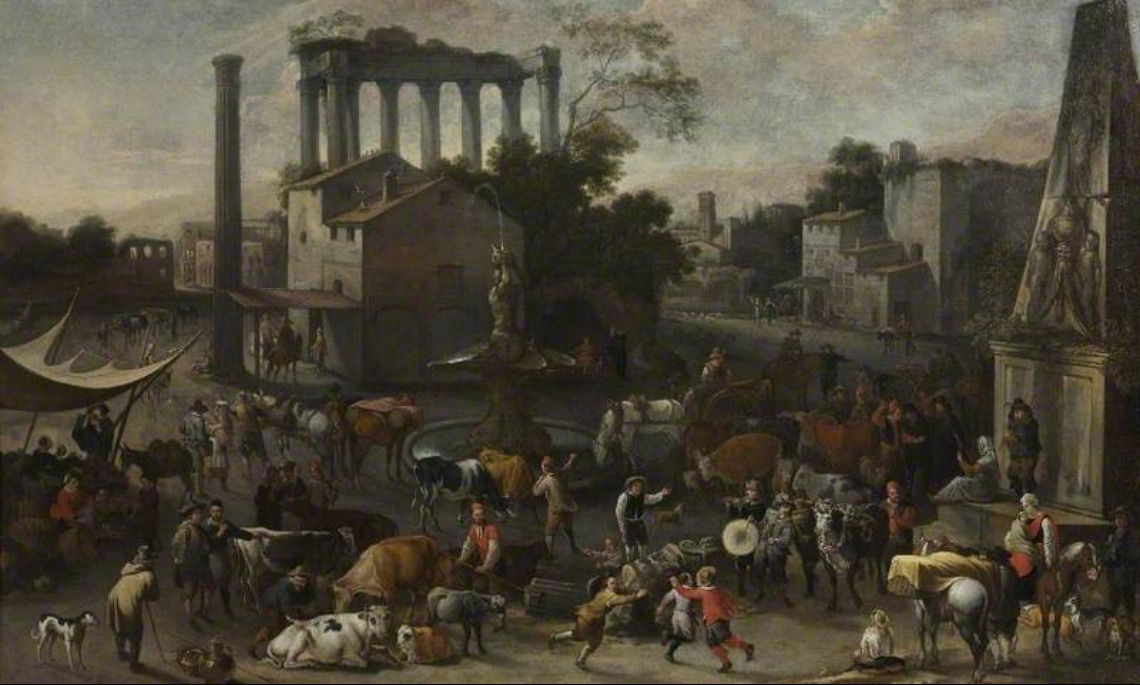
View of Campo Vaccino, Rome, 1643

Very few of Adriaen de Bie's works have survived. He painted in Rome small cabinet pieces, a type of painting for which there was a great demand in Rome at the beginning of the 17th century. It is possible that Adriaen de Bie's choice of support and size was influenced by Adam Elsheimer who was successful in Rome with small cabinet pieces. De Bie was a painter of portraits, biblical scenes for churches and Italianate landscapes.

He also painted on a large scale such as in his View of Campo Vaccino in Rome (Victoria Art Gallery, 1643). It shows a myriad of figures on the Forum Romanum. This type of work is likely indicative for a side-line he pursued during the three decades he spent in Lier after his return from Italy. The work is an Italianate landscape set among Roman buildings and populated with many figures and animals. The scene is reminiscent of the work of the group of genre painters active in Rome known as the Bamboccianti. The National Inventory of Continental European paintings records that there is an inscription on the front lower left of the painting reading 'ED · BIE - 1643', which is similar to the known signature of another Flemish painter called Erasmus de Bie. However, it seems unlikely that Erasmus who was only 14 years old in 1643 and had not travelled outside Antwerp could have made a painting of this scale and scope. It is therefore more likely that it is the work of Adriaen de Bie. The work is attributed to Adriaen de Bie on the Art UK website and in various publications.
