= Guilielmus Messaus =

Flemish composer

Guilielmus Messaus (or Messaulx, Missau) (bapt. 2 July 1589 – 8 March 1640) was a Flemish composer who lived in the city of Antwerp.

== Life and career ==
Guilielmus Messaus was born in Antwerp in 1589, and was baptised there on 2 July 1589. Between 1609 and 1610 he was a sacristan of the Church of Sint-Joris and in 1613 he became a schoolmaster and sacristan at St Willibrordus, Antwerp. In 1613 or 1614 he married Magdalena de Masereth with whom he had five children. His son Guilielmus was later a tenor for several years at Sint-Joris beginning in the year 1649.

From 1614 to 1618 Messaus was also a teacher at St Walburgis and St Andries, but was dismissed for bad behaviour. From before 1620 he was a singer and a choir-master at St Walburgis, a post he held until his death. In 1620 he was temporarily suspended due to refusing to perform a plainchant mass instead of a polyphonic one for the burial of a child. After the death of his first wife he married Clara Loycx in 1639. He died not long after on 8 March 1640 in Antwerp.

Messaus composed at least 14 masses, 57 motets, Dutch hymns, a canon and 3 secular songs in Dutch. He is now remembered mostly as a very productive musical arranger of cantiones natalitiae (Christmas songs), which were very popular in the Low Countries. He was also an active copyist of motets and harpsichord music.
