= Hubertus Reulandt =

- Born: 1590; St. Vith, Duchy of Luxembourg, Spanish Netherlands
- Died: 1661
- Occupation(s): printer and bookseller
- Years active: 1618–1661
- Era: handpress
- Parent(s): Haupricht Reulandt and Katharina Zander

Hubertus Reulandt (1590–1661) was a printer active in Luxembourg from 1618 to 1639 and in Trier from 1640 onwards.

A native of St. Vith in the Duchy of Luxembourg, Reulandt took over Moritz Schmalhertz's printing shop in the city of Luxembourg in 1618, and bought up the printing stock from the widow and heirs of Matthias Birton. There he printed numerous German editions of the decrees of the Archdukes Albert and Isabella (to 1621) and of Philip IV of Spain (from 1621), as well as Jesuit school drama, devotional works, and grammar-school classics such as Horace and Ovid. After he moved to Trier in 1640 there was no printer active in Luxembourg until 1686. In Trier he worked as printer to the Prince-Bishop.

== Publications ==
- Jean Robert, S.J., Historia S. Huberti Principis Aquitani ultimi tungrensis & primi leodiensis episcopi (Luxembourg, 1621) Available on Google Books
- Charles de Mansfeld, Caroli a Mansfelt clericorum coenobitica, sive canonicorum origo et vita (Luxembourg, 1625) Available on Google Books
- Charles de Mansfeld, Exercitatio civilis ad Regulas Iuris (Luxembourg, 1626) Available on Google Books
- Alexander Wilthemus, S.J., Acta D. Dagoberti Francorum Regis et Martyris (Trier, 1653) Available on Google Books
