= Wouter Abts =

Flemish painter

Wouter Abts (in French, Gautier Abts) was a Flemish painter, born at Lier, near Antwerp, possibly in 1582. He was a pupil of Willem de Vos (Guillaume de Vos in French). Little is known about his life. He was admitted as a master to the Guild at Antwerp in 1604–5; and he died in 1642–43. He mainly painted genre pieces, but a winter landscape has been attributed to him. He taught Adrian de Bie and Lenaert Coomans.
