= Petrus Divaeus =

Belgian scholar

Pieter Van Dieven, Latinized Petrus Divaeus (1535–1581) was a 16th-century scholar who wrote on the history of Belgic Gaul, the charters and liberties of the city of Leuven, and the history of the duchy of Brabant. Most of his work was issued in print only after his death.

== Life ==
Divaeus was born in Leuven in 1536, and served as clerk of the city council. Appointed pensionary of Mechelen, he died there in 1581.

== Writings ==
- De Galliae Belgicae Antiquitatibus (Antwerp, 1566)
- Rerum Brabanticarum Libri XIX, edited by Aubertus Miraeus (Antwerp, 1610)
- Opera Varia, edited by Jean-Noël Paquot (Leuven, 1757), containing:
  - Rerum Lovaniensium Libri quatuor
  - Annalium Oppidi Lovaniensis Libri Octo
  - Commentarius de Statu Belgiae sub Franciae imperio
