= Herman Hugo =

Belgian Jesuit priest and writer (1588–1629)

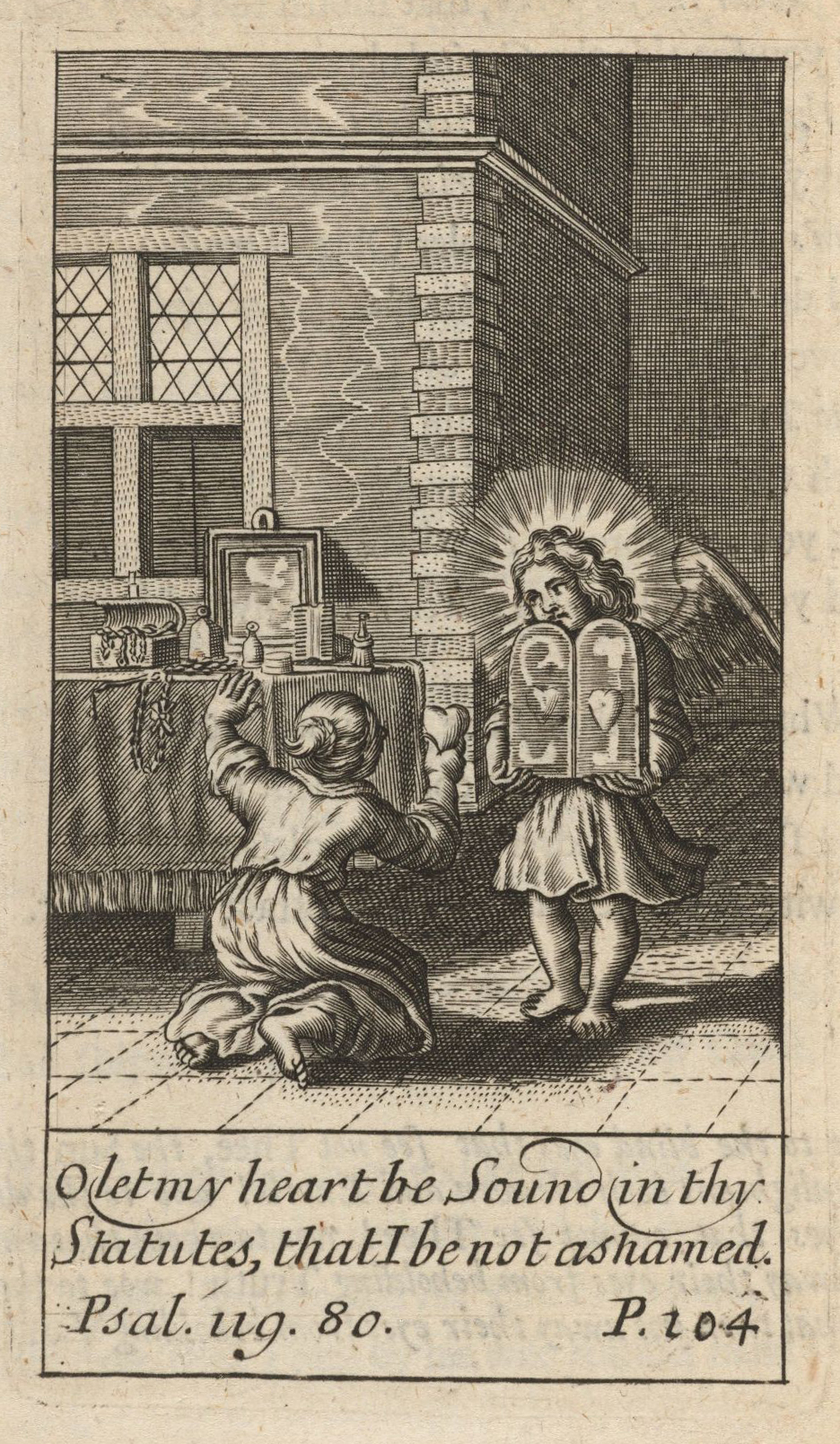
From an English translation of Pia desideria, 1690

Herman Hugo (9 May 1588 – 11 September 1629) was a Jesuit priest, writer and military chaplain. His Pia desideria, a spiritual emblem book published in Antwerp in 1624, was "the most popular religious emblem book of the seventeenth century". It went through 42 Latin editions and was widely translated up to the 18th century.

== Life ==
Herman Hugo was born in Brussels. He studied philosophy and theology at the University of Louvain. He died of plague on 11 September 1629 at Rheinsberg.

== Works ==
- Pia desideria emblematis elegiis at affectibus SS. Patrum illunstrata, Antwerp, 1624
- Obsidio Bredana, Antwerp, Plantin Press, 1626. An account of Ambrogio Spinola's Siege of Breda (1624)
- De militia equestri antiqua et noua, Antwerp, Plantin Press, 1630 (published posthumously)
