= Thomas Strickland =

Thomas Strickland may refer to:

- Thomas Strickland (died c. 1392), represented Westmoreland in the Merciless Parliament
- Thomas de Strickland (1367–1455), English soldier known for carrying the banner of St. George at the battle of Agincourt
- Thomas Strickland (died 1612), represented Westmoreland in Parliament in 1601 and 1604
- Sir Thomas Strickland (cavalier) (1621–1694), English politician and soldier
- Sir Thomas Strickland, 2nd Baronet (c. 1639–1684), English politician
- Thomas John Francis Strickland (c. 1682–1740), English Roman Catholic bishop of Namur and doctor of the Sorbonne
- Tom Strickland (born 1952), American lawyer and politician

== See also ==
- Strickland (surname)
