= Gilles du Monin =

Belgian Historian

Gilles du Monin (1565–1624), also known as Ægidius Monin, was a Belgian Jesuit ecclesiastical historian and liturgical author.

== Life ==
Monin was born at Beauraing in the Duchy of Luxembourg in 1565. He obtained the degree of Licentiate in Sacred Theology, and in 1592 was appointed a canon of Namur cathedral. In 1603 he resigned his canonry and entered the Society of Jesus. He went on to serve as rector of Jesuit colleges in Namur and Liège.

Monin helped write the propers for the saints of the diocese of Namur in the Tridentine office issued for the diocese by Jean Dauvin as bishop of Namur in 1619.

Gilles du Monin died 17 September 1624 while serving as spiritual prefect of a Jesuit house in Lille.

== Works ==
- Sacrarium Leodiense (1618)
- Sacrarium perantiqui comitatus Namurcensis (Liège, Jean Ouwerx, 1619)
