= Thomas John Francis Strickland =

- Bishop of Namur
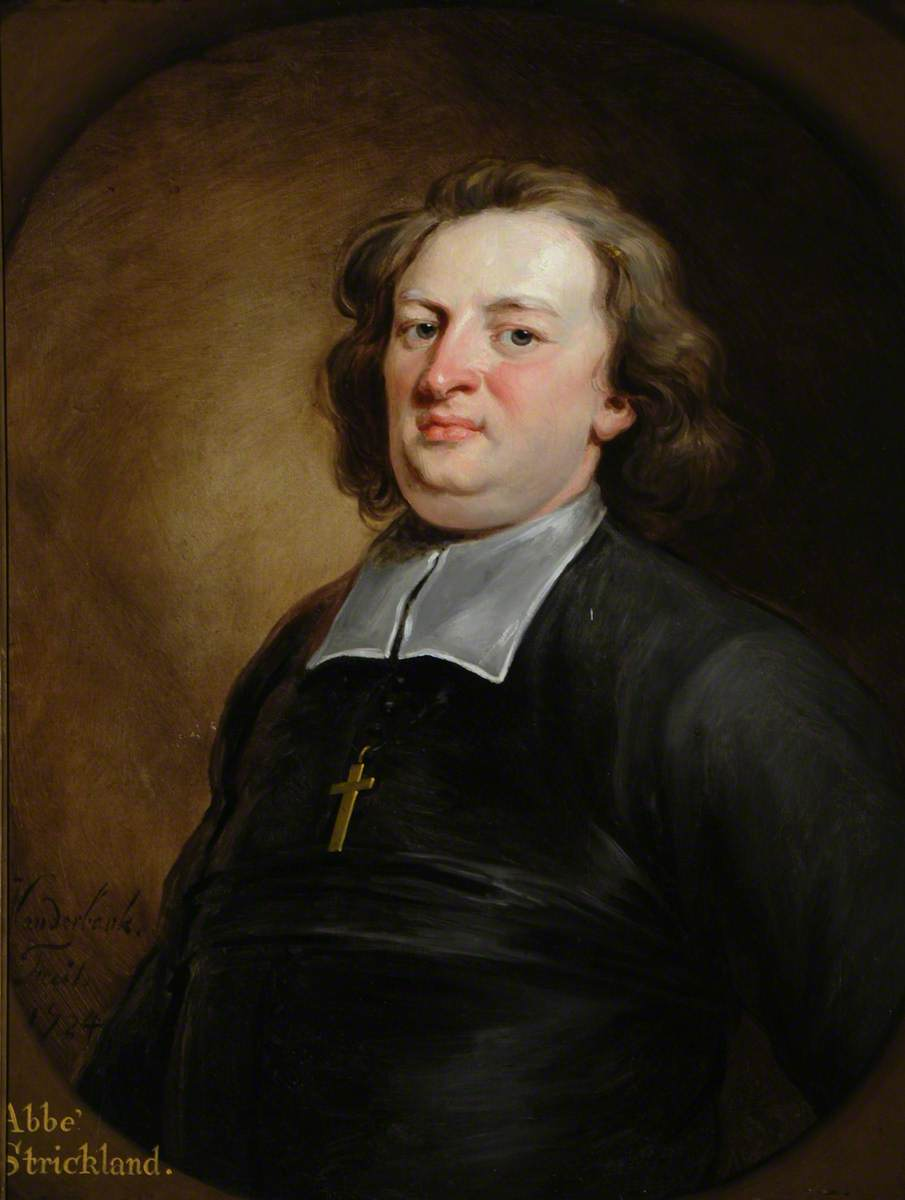
- Painting by John Vanderbank, 1724
- Diocese: Namur
- See: St Aubin's
- In office: 1727—1740
- Predecessor: Ferdinand de Berlo de Brus
- Successor: Paul-Godefroi de Berlo de Franc-Douaire

Orders
- Consecration: 12 May 1669

Personal details
- Born: c. 1682
- Died: 1740
- Parents: Sir Thomas Strickland and Winifred Trentham
- Education: College of Sorbonne

Thomas John Francis Strickland, known as Abbé Strickland (c.1682–1740) was an English Roman Catholic bishop of Namur and doctor of the Sorbonne.

== Biography ==
He was the fourth son of Sir Thomas Strickland of Sizergh and his second wife, Winifred Trentham, daughter and co-heiress of Sir Christopher Trentham of Rocester Abbey. He was brought up in France, where his family had fled at the Glorious Revolution. His father died at Rouen in 1694. He graduated from the English College, Douai in 1712, and then went to England.

He lived in London for some years, where he endeavoured to effect reconciliation between the English Catholics and the government, but unsuccessfully. All he achieved was the enmity of the Old Pretender and his exiled Court. Notwithstanding his family's long record of loyalty to the Stuarts and the Church, they attacked him as an enemy of the Catholic faith. Strickland in return denounced the Pretender's bigotry.

Strickland was made bishop of Namur in 1727. He resided at Rome for some years as an agent of the English government, and was employed by the Holy Roman Emperor Charles VI, who had high personal regard for him, sent him in 1734 on a mission to England in connection with a vain attempt to create war with France.

He died in Namur in 1740 and was buried in the Cathedral.

Catholic Church titles
| Preceded by Ferdinand de Berlo de Brus | Bishop of Namur; 1727–1740 | Succeeded by Paul-Godefroi de Berlo de Franc-Douaire |
