= André-Joseph Léonard =

Belgian Catholic archbishop (born 1940)

His Excellency André-Joseph Léonard
- Archbishop Emeritus of Mechelen-Brussels
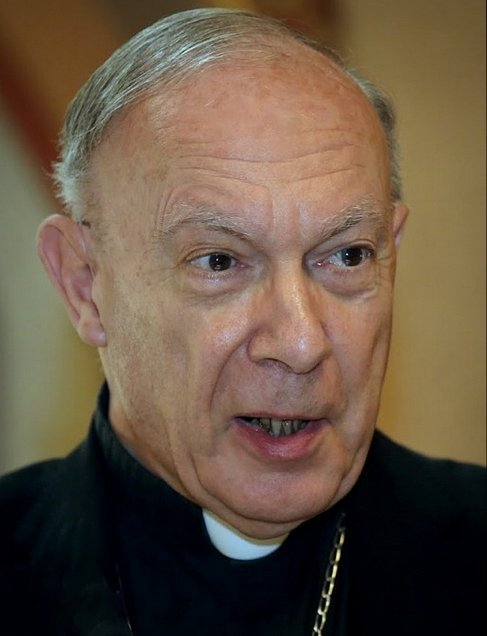
- Church: Catholic Church
- Archdiocese: Mechelen-Brussels
- Installed: 27 February 2010
- Term ended: 6 November 2015
- Predecessor: Godfried Danneels
- Successor: Jozef De Kesel
- Other post: Bishop of Namur (1991–2010)

Orders
- Ordination: 19 July 1964
- Consecration: 14 April 1991 by André-Marie Charue

Personal details
- Born: André Léonard; 6 May 1940 (age 86) Jambes, Namur, Belgium
- Occupation: Philosopher, theologian
- Education: Université catholique de Louvain
- Motto: Oh, oui, viens, Seigneur Jésus! Apocalypse 22:17–20

- Coat of arms

André-Joseph Léonard (French pronunciation: [ɑ̃dʁe ʒozɛf leɔnaʁ]; born 6 May 1940) is a Belgian Catholic retired prelate who served as the Archbishop of Mechelen-Brussels and Primate of Belgium from 2010 to 2015. He previously served as Bishop of Namur from 1991 until 2010 under the name André-Mutien Léonard.

== Early life ==
Léonard was born André Léonard on 6 May 1940 in Jambes, Namur. His father died shortly after his birth during the first days of the German invasion of Belgium. He is one of four brothers who all became diocesan priests. After his studies at the Collège Notre-Dame de la Paix in Namur, he was sent by André-Marie Charue, the Bishop of Namur, to Pope Leo XIII Seminary in Leuven, where he earned a master's degree in Philosophy.

== Academic career ==
Léonard continued his studies in Rome at the Belgian Pontifical College, where he graduated with a degree in theology. He was ordained a priest on 19 July 1964 by Charue. He stayed in Rome, and earned a Licentiate of Sacred Theology at the Pontifical Gregorian University.

In 1974 Léonard obtained a doctorate in philosophy from the Catholic University of Louvain, with a thesis entitled "A literal commentary on the logic of Hegel". He taught in the philosophy department of Louvain until 1991. In the late 1980s he became a member of the International Theological Commission, the consultative organ of the Congregation for the Doctrine of the Faith.

== Episcopal career ==
Léonard was appointed Bishop of Namur by Pope John Paul II on 7 February 1991, for which he was consecrated on 14 April of that year by Cardinal Godfried Danneels. He has been described as a man whose theological vision is in line with Pope Benedict XVI's.

As Bishop of Namur, Léonard focused in particular upon youth ministry and the promotion of vocations to the priesthood. His seminary complex, which also includes Redemptoris Mater Seminary run by the Neocatechumenate movement, is said to have the largest enrollment in Belgium (where in 2010, 35 of the 71 Belgian seminarians study). Italian Vatican writer Andrea Tornielli reports that Léonard is considered "the most traditional of the Belgian bishops".

When first named a bishop, Léonard added the name "Mutien" to his first name André in honor of Mutien-Marie Wiaux, a Belgian Brother of the Christian Schools who is honored as a saint.

Léonard preached the 1999 Lenten retreat for Pope John Paul II and the Roman Curia.

=== Primate of Belgium ===
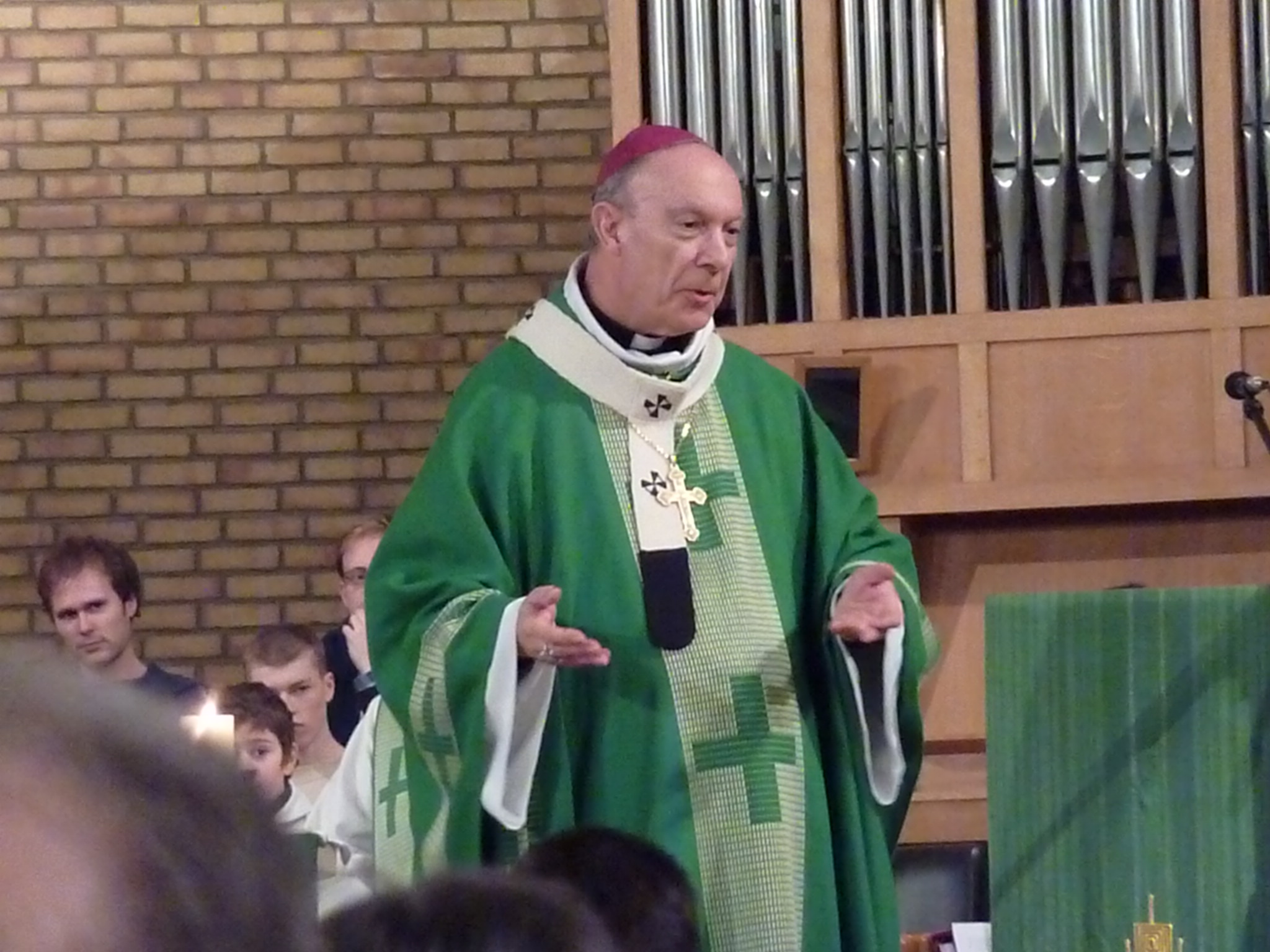
André-Joseph Léonard visiting the parish of Terbank Heverlee in February 2012

On 18 January 2010, Léonard was appointed Archbishop of Mechelen-Brussels by Pope Benedict XVI, replacing the retiring Cardinal Danneels.

When named Archbishop of Mechelen-Brussels, Léonard chose to drop "Mutien" and instead appended "Joseph" to his name, in reference to Saint Joseph, patron saint of Belgium.

On 5 January 2011, Léonard was appointed among the first members of the newly created Pontifical Council for the Promotion of the New Evangelisation.

==== Initial reception ====
In response to Léonard's appointment, Deputy Prime Minister Laurette Onkelinx, who is also the country's health minister, said, "Church and State are separate in Belgium, but when there are problems in our society, all the social partners sit down around a table, including representatives of secularism and of religion. Cardinal Danneels was a man of openness, of tolerance and was able to fit in there. Léonard has already regularly challenged decisions made by our parliament." She added: "Concerning AIDS, he's against the use of condoms even while people are dying from it every day. He is against abortion and euthanasia ... The pope's choice could undermine the compromise that allows us to live together with respect for everyone."

The Socialist Party said it "insists that Archbishop Léonard respects democratic decisions taken by the institutions of our country. For the Socialist Party, the rights and duties that people take on democratically take precedence over religious traditions and commandments, without any exception.".

==== Sex abuse crisis ====
In April 2010, the then-Bishop of Bruges, Roger Vangheluwe, retired and admitted that for years he had abused a nephew. In June 2010, police raided both the palace of the archbishop and the home of retired Cardinal Godfried Danneels. The offices of an independent commission set up by the newly installed Léonard in early 2010 to look into cases of sexual abuse were also raided. At the time, Léonard said the move showed that the Church wanted to "resolutely turn a page on a very painful" topic. There was no suggestion Léonard was involved in a coverup (having been in the office for half a year), but he was criticized for saying that full prosecution of elderly abusive priests was unnecessary given their age and the effect public prosecutions would have on victims.

The raids were not well received by the Catholic Church, even raising the ire of the Pope. Pope Benedict XVI in a letter addressed to Archbishop Leonard said that: "I wish to express to you, dear Brother in the Episcopate, as well as to all the Bishops of Belgium, my closeness and my solidarity at this moment of sadness, in which, with certain surprising and deplorable modalities, searches have been carried out, including in the Cathedral of Mechelen and in the premises where the Belgian Episcopate was meeting in Plenary Session. During this meeting, there should have been, inter alia, aspects related to the abuse of minors by clergy. I myself have repeated many times that these serious facts should be dealt with by the civil order and by the canonical order in the mutual respect of the specificity and autonomy of each. In this sense, I hope that justice will follow its course by guaranteeing the rights of individuals and institutions, with respect for the victims."

==== Temperament ====
- In November 2010 Léonard's spokesman, Juergen Mettepenningen, quit after only three months. Mettepenningen said at a press conference that "Monsignor Leonard at times acts like a motorist driving on the wrong side of a freeway who thinks all the other motorists are wrong."
- In December 2010, speaking at a parliamentary commission on child abuse in Belgium, Léonard's predecessor, Danneels (who had been archbishop from 1979 until 2010 during which revelations about the sexual abuse crisis first became public) admitting his mistakes, stated "for too long the church thought only about itself and about its priests and now it is time to think about the victims of sexual abuse". When Léonard was asked about whether the Catholic Church would contribute to a general compensation fund set up for victims of sexual abuse (including those not abused by Catholic priests), he refused stating that "The civil court must determine the compensation and the offender must pay." The commission was surprised as they thought that Léonard would build on Danneels' testimony and use the opportunity to try to heal the poor relations between the government and the Catholic Church over the sex abuse crisis. Léonard added that he expected representatives of other "respectable professions," like medicine and sports, to contribute as well "because abuse is not a monopoly of the church." Léonard then donated to a fund "not because we are obliged to do that, but because we want to show solidarity, as we also regularly do for victims of floods or epidemics."
- In October 2010, Léonard was criticised by HIV activists, gay advocates, and political party operatives for rejecting the idea that AIDS is "a punishment from God", instead "this epidemic is sort of intrinsic justice, not at all a punishment." He continued saying that "All I'm saying is that sometimes there are consequences linked to our actions" and that "HIV carriers merit respect" and "must not suffer discrimination." "I believe this is a totally decent, honourable and respectable stance."
- Léonard said that retired priests suspected of paedophilia should be spared canonical action (removal from the priesthood or laicization), which he termed "a sort of vengeance." Leonard stated of the priests, "if they're no longer working, if they have no responsibilities, I'm not sure that exercising a sort of vengeance that will have no concrete result is humane."

== Positions on moral and political issues ==
=== Belgian political crisis of 2007–08 ===
In 2007, Belgium was facing one of the longest and most intense political crises in its 178 years of existence. After the Belgian general election of 2007, Belgium entered a period of communitarian tensions and political instability, mostly caused by the different opinions about the need and the extent of a state reform.

On 9 July 2008, Bishop Léonard published an open letter on the website of the Diocese of Namur entitled The end of Belgium? (French: La fin de la Belgique?). He wrote that Belgium will not fall apart:

I hear questions about the future of this country. Will it burst soon? Frankly, I think not. Realism requires us to stay together, Flemings, Walloons and inhabitants of Brussels. If we need months to negotiate the formation of a government, how many years would we need to resolve issues raised by a division of the country: the status of Brussels, the fate of the monarchy, not to mention the innumerable legal and tax problems. We will stay together. Despite our cultural differences, we still have so many things in common. Political conflicts are sometimes acute. But when French speakers and Dutch speakers meet on social, educational and commercial terms, things often happen well. But what is likely is that the Belgian government will federalise even more. It's just what we are already living very peacefully, in terms of the life of the Church. We are one Episcopal Conference, in a beautiful fraternal harmony, but each language group has its own meetings and its specific guidelines.

Léonard asked Walloons and French-speaking inhabitants of Brussels to renounce their superiority complex of the French language against Dutch-speaking Belgians. Bishop Léonard himself is a proficient speaker of Dutch.

If then the French-speaking Belgians, naturally more attached to a united Belgium than the Flemish, want, quite legitimately, Belgium to survive, it is not enough that they fly the Belgian flag in the streets. They must renounce any linguistic superiority complex. They must learn, each according to his social role, to know and to love the language and culture of their northern neighbors.

The letter was published the same month in the Dutch Catholic magazine Katholiek Nieuwsblad.

=== Homosexuality ===
In an April 2007 interview for the weekly Télé Moustique, Léonard was asked about his position on homosexuality and described homosexual behaviour as "abnormal".

The same as Freud: it is an imperfectly developed stage of human sexuality which contradicts its inner logic. Homosexuals have encountered a blockage in their normal psychological development, rendering them abnormal. I know that in a few years, I will risk prison by saying this, but it could offer me vacations.

As a consequence, Léonard was charged with homophobia under Belgium's 2003 Anti-Discrimination Act, after gay activists have said he sought to "stigmatize" homosexuals. Due to the criticisms that followed his interview, Bishop Léonard quickly clarified that it is their behaviour that is abnormal, not their very person.

In April 2009, the Belgian courts ruled that Léonard's comments were not severe enough to be considered slander or discrimination.

"Homosexuality is not the same as normal sex in the same way that anorexia is not a normal appetite," Léonard said in an interview for a Belgian television station. He added that he would "never call anorexia patients abnormal."

In April 2013, Léonard was doused with water from bottles shaped like the Virgin Mary by four topless FEMEN activists while participating in a debate with philosophy professor Guy Haarscher on the subject of blasphemy and freedom of speech at the Université libre de Bruxelles. The archbishop remained in silent prayer during the incident.

== Resignation ==
Upon reaching the age of 75 on 6 May 2015, Léonard submitted his resignation as archbishop to the Apostolic Nuncio of the Holy See to Belgium, as required by Church law. On the following 1 June, the archdiocese announced that Pope Francis had accepted it, to be effective with the naming of his successor. While the archdiocese described it as a routine response, some media speculated that this was an exceptionally quick action.

== Works ==
- Léonard, André-Mutien (1970), La foi chez Hegel (in French), Paris: Desclée
- Léonard, André-Mutien (1974), Commentaire litteral de la Logique de Hegel (in French), Louvain: Éditions de l'Institut supérieur de philosophie – J. Vrin, ISBN 978-2-8017-0001-3
- Léonard, André-Mutien (1980), Pensées des Hommes et Foi en Jésus-Christ. Pour un discernement intellectuel chrétien (in French), Paris. Price 1980 « Scriptores christiani »
- Léonard, André-Mutien (1987), Les raisons de croire (in French), Éditions Communio Fayard
- Léonard, André-Mutien (1997), Je suis le Chemin, la Vérité et la Vie (in French), Paris: Ed. de l'Emmanuel
- Léonard, André-Mutien (1988), Jésus et ton corps. La morale sexuelle expliquée aux jeunes (in French), Paris: Mame
- Léonard, André-Mutien (1989), Cohérence de la foi. Essai de théologie fondamentale (in French), Paris: Desclées
- Léonard, André-Mutien (1998), Père, que ton règne vienne (in French), Paris: Ed. de l'Emmanuel
- Léonard, André-Mutien (1999), Le fondement de la morale. Essai d'éthique philosophique générale (in French), Paris: Éd. du Cerf
- Léonard, André-Mutien (2001), Foi et philosophies. Guide pour un discernement chrétien (in French), Bruxelles: Éd. Lessius
- Léonard, André-Mutien (2001), L'évêque et le fou (avec Henry Haas) (in French), Paris: Le Sarment
- Léonard, André-Mutien (2002), L'Église, Marie et la femme (in French), Québec: Anne Sigier
- Léonard, André-Mutien (2002), Dieu exauce-t-il nos prières? (in French), Paris: Éd. de l'Emmanuel
- Léonard, André-Mutien (2003), Envoyés pour annoncer. Le cœur de la foi chrétienne (in French), Paris: Éd. de l'Emmanuel
- Léonard, André-Mutien (2004), La mort et son au-delà (in French), Paris: Presses de la Renaissance
- Léonard, André-Mutien (2005), Pastorale et catéchèse des sacrements. Impasses et perspectives (in French), Québec: A. Sigier
- Léonard, André-Mutien (2006), Métaphysique de l'être. Essai de philosophie fondamentale (in French), Paris: Les Éditions du Cerf
- Léonard, André-Mutien (2007), Catholique... que du bonheur (avec Henry Haas) (in French), Paris: Sarment
- Léonard, André-Mutien (2008), Les raisons d'espérer (in French), Paris: Presses de la Renaissance
- Léonard, André-Mutien (2009), Ton corps pour aimer. La morale sexuelle expliquée aux jeunes (in French), Paris: Edifa-Mame, ISBN 978-2-916350-63-9

== Notes ==
Catholic Church titles
Preceded by Robert-Joseph Mathen	Bishop of Namur; 7 February 1991 – 18 January 2010	Succeeded by Rémy Victor Vancottem
Preceded by Godfried Danneels	3rd Archbishop of Mechelen-Brussels; 18 January 2010 – 6 November 2015	Succeeded by Jozef De Kesel
Preceded by Godfried Danneels	Primate of Belgium; 18 January 2010 – 6 November 2015	Succeeded by Jozef De Kesel
Preceded by Godfried Danneels	Ordinary of military ordinariate of Belgium; 27 February 2010 – 6 November 2015	Succeeded by Jozef De Kesel
