= Antoine Havet =

Danish bishop (died 1578)

Antoine Havet O.P.
- Bishop of Namur
- Diocese: Namur
- See: St Aubin's Cathedral
- Predecessor: newly erected
- Successor: François Wallon-Capelle

Orders
- Consecration: 24 May 1562

Personal details
- Born: unknown
- Died: 30 November 1578 Namur
- Buried: St Aubin's Cathedral
- Denomination: Roman Catholic
- Motto: Hoc age (Do this)
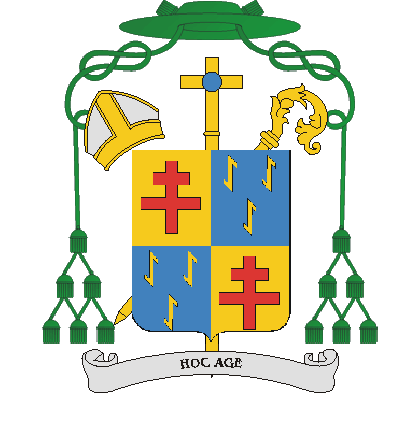
- Coat of arms

Antoine Havet, Latinized Havetius (died 1578), was the first bishop of Namur in the Habsburg Netherlands.

== Life ==
Havet was born early in the 16th century, the son of a miller. Showing aptitude for scholarship, he received a better education than his siblings, and was sent to school in Arras, where he joined the Dominican Order. He studied philosophy and theology at the College of Sorbonne, graduating doctor on 28 January 1549. He gained a reputation as a preacher in both Paris and the Low Countries. In 1553, he was sent to Rome as definitor of his province at the general chapter. On returning to the Low Countries he was elected prior of the Dominican house in Arras.

Mary of Hungary appointed him preacher to the Brussels court and later as her own spiritual director. He was kept on as preacher and confessor by Margaret of Parma, who proposed him as the first bishop of Namur after the creation of the diocese in 1559.

Havet was consecrated bishop on 24 May 1562, and soon thereafter was deputed to the Council of Trent, together with François Richardot, bishop of Arras, Martin Rythovius, bishop of Ypres, and three theologians from the University of Leuven. Havet took part in the 23rd, 24th and 25th sessions of the Council, and was on the committee that investigated Giovanni Grimani, patriarch of Aquileia, on suspicions of Lutheranism. After his return to the Low Countries, he was a keen supporter of a full and early introduction of the canons of the Council, without regard for local privileges. He also pressed for a full application of the laws against heresy, despite the dissatisfaction with them that would soon lead to the Dutch Revolt.

He took part in the provincial council of the archdiocese of Cambrai convened by Maximilian de Berghes in 1565, again pressing for the immediate introduction of the Tridentine canons in full, against the opposition of the chapter of Cambrai. In July 1570, he held a diocesan synod in Namur, the statutes of which were published in Leuven in 1571 with Jan Bogard. In 1572, he was captured by the rebels and refused to take an oath of loyalty to their cause. He was subjected to various forms of mistreatment until ransomed by his friends. He was among those who urged the recalling of the Duke of Alva. In 1576 he sided with the Estates General on the Pacification of Ghent, and in 1577 he was a signatory of the Union of Brussels.

Havet died in Namur on 30 November 1578. He was buried in St Aubin's Cathedral, but his tomb was lost when the cathedral was demolished in 1750.

== Publications ==
- De Statu Belgii (further details unknown)
