= Robert-Joseph Mathen =

Belgian bishop

- Bishop of Namur
- Church: Catholic Church
- Diocese: Diocese of Namur
- In office: 24 June 1974 – 7 February 1991
- Predecessor: André-Marie Charue
- Successor: André-Joseph Léonard
- Previous posts: Titular Bishop of Tituli in Numidia (1974); Coadjutor Bishop of Namur (1974)

Orders
- Ordination: 25 August 1940
- Consecration: 3 May 1974 by André-Marie Charue

Personal details
- Born: 30 December 1916 Aubange, Belgium, German Empire
- Died: 19 January 1997 (aged 80) Namur, Belgium

Robert-Joseph Mathen (1916–1997) was the 28th Bishop of Namur in Belgium.

Mathen was born in Aubange on 30 December 1916, and was educated at Collège Saint-Joseph de Virton. He entered the seminary and was ordained to the priesthood on 25 August 1940, after which he studied Theology at the Catholic University of Leuven. In 1960 he was appointed dean of Arlon, and on 24 June 1974 he became bishop of Namur named by Pope Paul VI. He had already been consecrated as his predecessor's coadjutor bishop on 3 May the same year. In 1990 Pope John-Paul II accepted his resignation, to come into force when his successor was appointed.

He died as a result of pneumonia on 19 January 1997 and his funeral service took place in Namur cathedral on 23 January.
