= George C. Christie =

American legal academic and author (1934–2025)

- Born: March 3, 1934; New York City, U.S.
- Died: November 4, 2025 (aged 91); Durham, North Carolina, U.S.
- Citizenship: American
- Occupations: Legal academic, author
- Title: James B. Duke Emeritus Professor of Law

George Custis Christie (March 3, 1934 – November 4, 2025) was an American legal academic and author. He was the James B. Duke Emeritus Professor of Law at Duke University School of Law in Durham, North Carolina, where he taught jurisprudence and tort law before retiring from teaching in 2013.

== Early life and education ==
Christie was born in New York City on March 3, 1934. His father, himself a lawyer, emigrated from Greece to the United States in 1920. He was awarded his A.B. in 1955 and his J.D. in 1957, both from Columbia University. While at Columbia he was editor-in-chief of the Columbia Law Review. In 1962, he was granted a diploma in international law from Cambridge University. Later, in 1966, he received S.J.D. from Harvard University.

== Career ==
Christie was admitted to the bar in New York in 1957 and in the District of Columbia in 1958. He spent two years in private practice in Washington D.C. and from 1960 to 1961 he was a Ford Fellow at Harvard Law School. From 1961 to 1962, he was a Fulbright Scholar at Cambridge University. Following his time at Cambridge he became a member of the faculty at University of Minnesota Law School. In 1966, he left the University of Minnesota and returned to Washington D.C. where he served as the assistant general counsel for the Near East and South Asia of the Agency for International Development.

He was on the faculty of Duke University School of Law from 1967.

Christie received an honorary doctorate from the University of Athens in 2007.

He influenced the Duke University academic governance through the so-called Christie Rule, recommended by a committee he was chairing in 1972. The rule aims to guarantee that the voice of the faculty be heard prior to the board of trustees reaching significant decisions.

== Death ==
Christie died at his home in Durham, North Carolina, on November 4, 2025, at the age of 91.

== Selected works ==
=== Books ===
- Philosopher Kings? The Adjudication of Conflicting Human Rights and Social Values, Oxford University Press 2011, ISBN 978-0-195-34115-7
- The Notion of an Ideal Audience in Legal Argument, Kluwer Academic 2000, ISBN 0-7923-6283-7, translated in French with introduction by Guy Haarscher as L'auditoire universel dans l'argumentation juridique, Bruylant 2005, ISBN 978-2-8027-2035-5
- Law, Norms and Authority, Duckworth 1982, ISBN 0-7156-1593-9

=== Case Books ===
- Advanced Torts: Cases and Materials, West, ISBN 978-1-68328-648-6
- Jurisprudence: Text and Readings on the Philosophy of Law, West Academic Publishing 1973, 3d ed. 2008 (with Patrick H. Martin), ISBN 978-0-314-17073-6
