= Thomas Louis Heylen =

Belgian prelate of the Catholic Church (1856–1941)

Thomas Louis Heylen O. Praem.
- Bishop of Namur
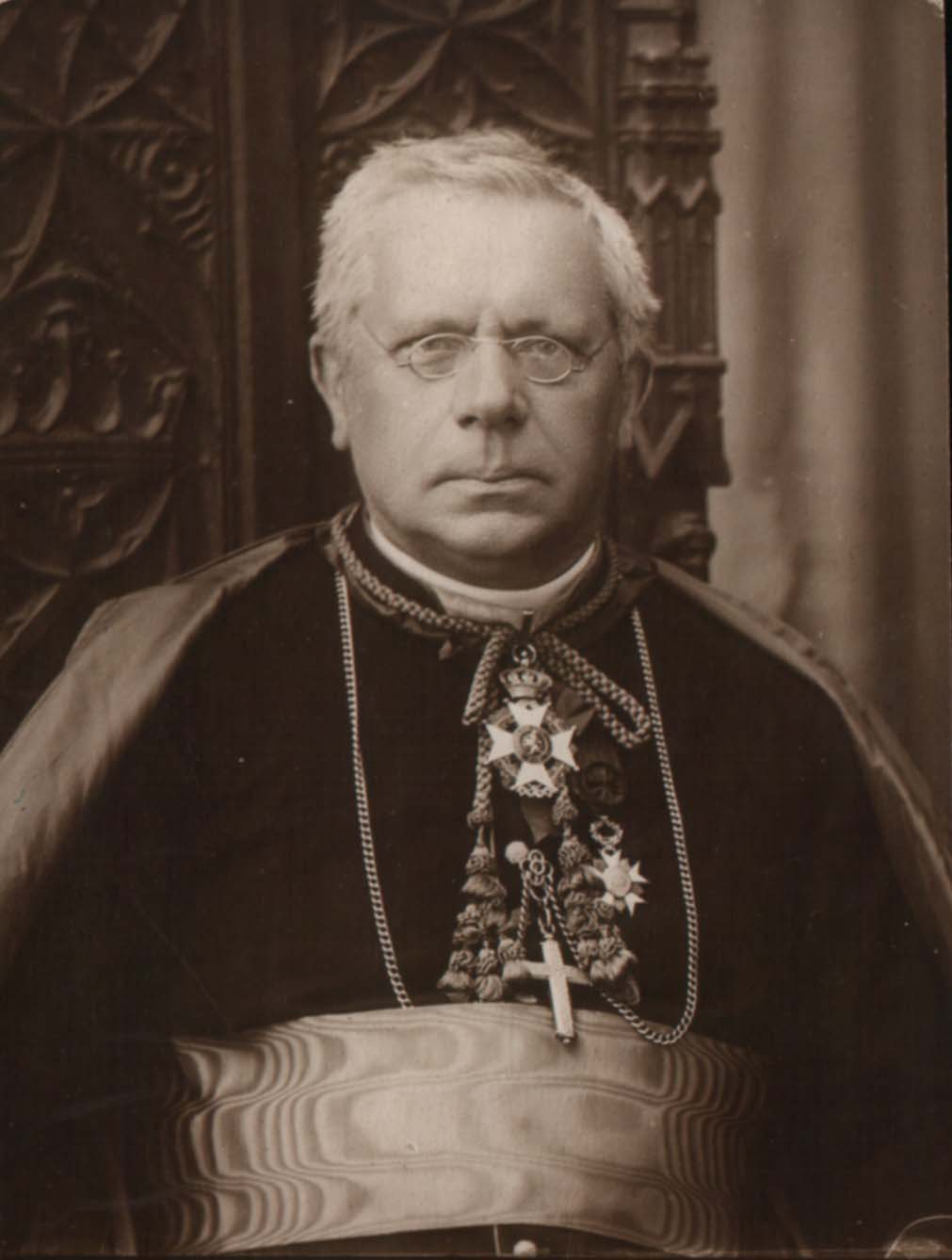
- A photograph of Mgr Heylen taken during the First World War
- Church: Catholic
- Diocese: Namur
- See: St Aubin's Cathedral
- Predecessor: Jean-Baptiste Decrolière
- Successor: André-Marie_Charue
- Other post: President of the Pontifical Committee for International Eucharistic Congresses
- Previous post: Abbot of Tongerlo Abbey

Orders
- Ordination: 11 January 1881 by Victor-Jean-Joseph-Marie van den Branden de Reeth
- Consecration: 30 November 1899 by Pierre-Lambert Goossens

Personal details
- Born: 5 February 1856 Kasterlee, Province of Antwerp, Belgium
- Died: 27 October 1941 (aged 85) Namur, Province of Namur, Belgium
- Motto: Prudenter et simpliciter

Thomas Louis Heylen OPraem (1856–1941) was a Belgian prelate of the Catholic Church who served as the twenty-sixth bishop of Namur in Belgium (1899–1941). He also served as President of the Pontifical Committee for International Eucharistic Congresses.

== Life ==
Heylen was born in Kasterlee on 5 February 1856 and studied at the Jesuit college in nearby Turnhout. On 25 August 1875 he became a member of Tongerlo Abbey, taking the name of Thomas of Canterbury. He was ordained to the priesthood on 11 January 1881 in Mechelen and was sent to Rome to study philosophy, theology, and canon law. He was elected abbot of Tongerlo in 1887. As abbot he founded Corpus Christi Priory in Manchester and a Premonstratensian mission post in Congo Free State.

Heylen was named bishop of Namur on 23 October 1899 and was consecrated on 30 November. His emphasis was on encouraging religious devotion, promoting both mass pilgrimages and private retreats among the laity and emphasizing ongoing formation for the clergy. In 1901 he became president of the Pontifical Committee for International Eucharistic Congresses, in succession to Victor Joseph Doutreloux, bishop of Liège. He hosted the 1902 Eucharistic Congress in his own diocese, and personally presided at the International Eucharistic Congresses in Montreal (1910), Chicago (28th International Eucharistic Congress, 1926), Sydney (1928), Carthage (1930), Buenos Aires (1934) and Manila (1937). During the First World War he was appointed vicar apostolic to French territory under German occupation. He maintained a "patriotic" line (refusing to host the King of Bavaria in his cathedral), and on two visits to Rome defended the outspokenness of Cardinal Mercier from critics in the Roman Curia, although he was not himself so outspoken. He founded the diocesan schools of Saint-Michel in Neufchâteau (1909), Saint-Pierre in Bouillon (1910), and Sainte-Begge in Andenne (1925). He died in Namur on 27 October 1941.

Catholic Church titles
Preceded by Jean-Baptiste Decrolière	Bishop of Namur; 1899–1941	Succeeded by André-Marie_Charue
