= Jean Dave =

Medieval bishop

- Bishop of Namur
- Diocese: Namur
- See: St Aubin's Cathedral
- Appointed: 1593
- In office: 1594–1595
- Previous post: Ecclesiastical councillor on the Great Council of Mechelen

Orders
- Consecration: 18 September 1594 by Laevinus Torrentius

Personal details
- Born: 1531 Namur, Marquisate of Namur, Habsburg Netherlands
- Died: 3 March 1595 (aged 63–64) Namur, Marquisate of Namur, Habsburg Netherlands
- Education: theology and canon law

Jean Dave (1531–1595) was a prelate in the Habsburg Netherlands who briefly served as the third bishop of Namur.

== Life ==
Dave was born in Namur. He took degrees in theology and canon law, and served as ecclesiastical councillor on the provincial council of Namur. In 1580 he was appointed provost of the cathedral chapter. By letters patent of 22 June 1590 he was appointed ecclesiastical councillor to the Great Council of Mechelen, and the following year he became a canon of St. Rumbold's Cathedral. On 25 March 1593, Philip II of Spain proposed him as bishop of Namur, and the pope confirmed the appointment early in 1594. Dave was consecrated bishop in Antwerp on 18 September 1594, by Laevinus Torrentius, with co-consecrators Ghisbertus Masius, bishop of 's-Hertogenbosch, and Francisco de Ribera, bishop of Leighlin. He was installed in Namur on 23 October 1594, and died there on 3 March 1595.

Catholic Church titles
Preceded by François Wallon-Capelle	Bishop of Namur; 1594–1595	Succeeded by Jacques Blaseus
