= Roman Catholic Diocese of Tongeren =

Former Roman Catholic ecclesiastical territory in Belgium

The Roman Catholic Diocese of Tongeren was an ancient bishopric of Belgium, now a Latin titular bishopric in present Belgium.

== History ==
In 344, it was established as Diocese of Tongeren on territory split off from the then Roman Catholic Diocese of Cologne (Köln, Germany). The traditional account makes Saint Servatius its founder.

In 380 it was renamed as Diocese of Tongeren and Maastricht, acknowledging a secondary see (in the present Netherlands).

In 530 it was formally suppressed, its territory being used to establish the Diocese of Maastricht, which in turn was suppressed in 720 to establish the Diocese of Liège, but would be nominally revived (separately) in 1971 as a Latin titular see of episcopal rank.

== Titular see ==
The diocese was nominally restored on 1969.05.30 as a Latin titular see of episcopal rank, with an exception of archiepiscopal rank.

It has had the following incumbents, after a long initial vacancy :

- Titular Archbishop Henri Lemaître (1969.05.30 – death 2003.04.20), Apostolic Delegate (papal diplomatic envoy) to Vietnam (1969.05.30 – 1975.12.19), then Apostolic Pro-Nuncio (papal ambassador) to Uganda (1975.12.19 – 1981.11.16), next Apostolic Pro-Nuncio to the Nordic countries Denmark and Finland and Iceland and Norway and Sweden (1985.10.31 – 1992.03.28), final Apostolic Nuncio (papal ambassador) to the Netherlands (1992.03.28 – emeritate 1997.02.08)
- Pierre Warin (2004.07.08 – 2019.06.05), Auxiliary Bishop of Namur (Belgium)

== External links and sources ==
- GCatholic
