= Robert Strickland =

English landowner and politician

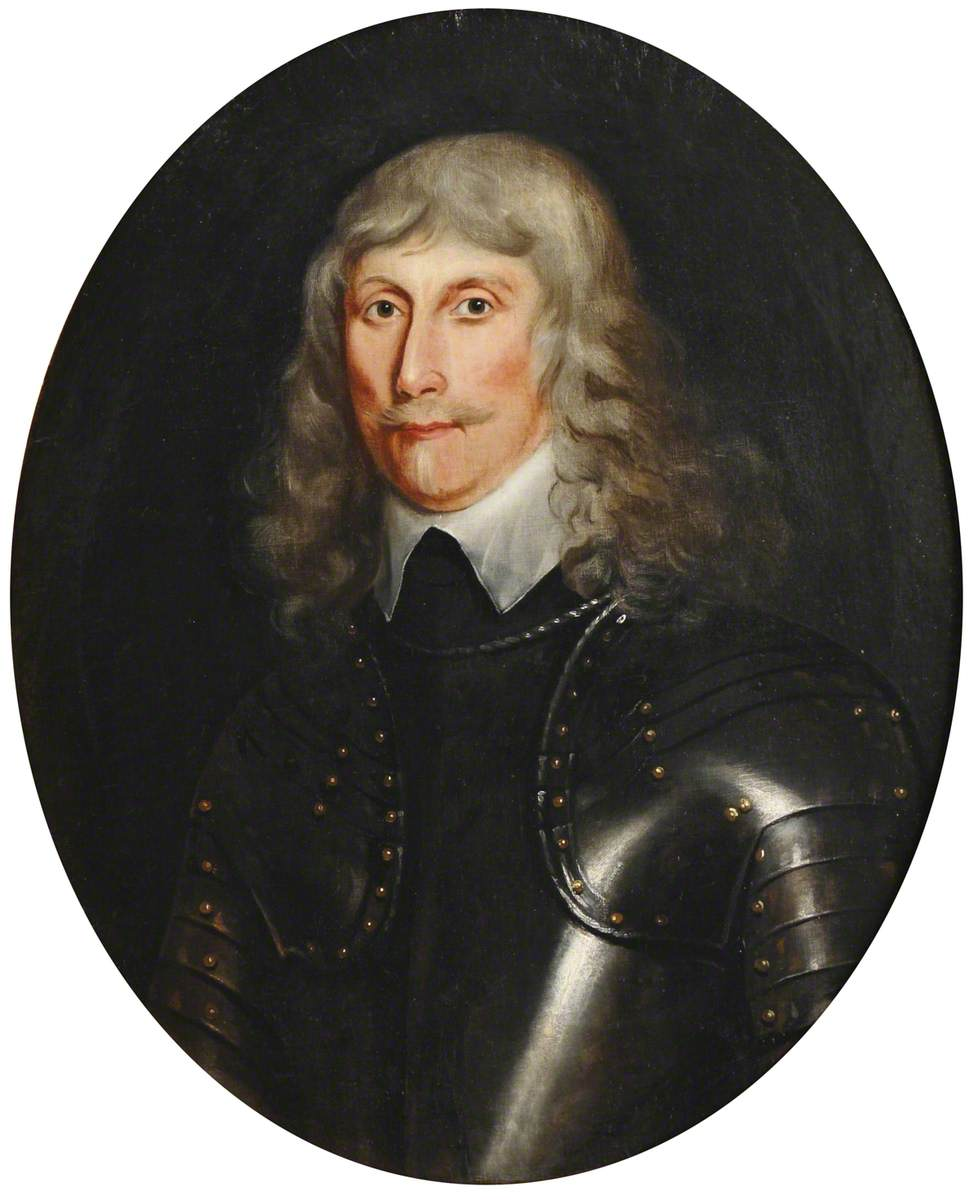
Sir Robert Strickland (1600–1671).

Sir Robert Strickland of Sizergh (1 January 1600 – April 1671) was an English landowner and politician who sat in the House of Commons in the Parliament of 1624. He supported King Charles I during the Wars of the Three Kingdoms.

== Biography ==
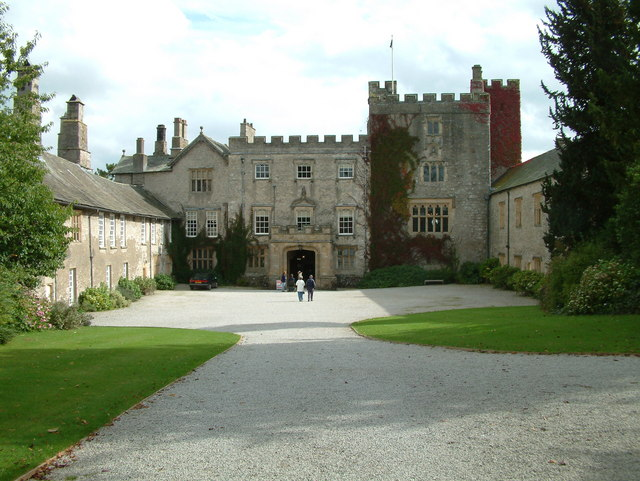
Sizergh Castle, the Strickland family home

Strickland was the eldest son of Sir Thomas Strickland of Sizergh Castle, Helsington, Cumbria, and his second wife Margaret Curwen, daughter of Sir Nicholas Curwen and sister of the politician Sir Henry Curwen. He matriculated from Trinity College, Cambridge at Easter 1615. In 1624, he was elected Member of Parliament for Westmorland in the Happy Parliament.

In 1638, Strickland received a colonel's commission from Thomas Wentworth, 1st Earl of Strafford, Lord Lieutenant of the county of York, to command 900 militia in the North Riding (the Northallertonshire Trained Band) for Charles I during the Bishops' War. In 1640, he received the King's commission from Algernon, 10th Earl of Northumberland to raise a regiment, accoutre it, and march it to Newcastle-upon-Tyne. In the English Civil War, he received a third commission to command a troop of cavalry which he is said to have supported largely at his own expense. At the battle of Edgehill, he himself commanded the cavalry, and his son Sir Thomas Strickland commanded the regiment of foot soldiers.

Strickland lived to welcome the Restoration of King Charles II: and in the year after the Restoration, he was constituted by Thomas Viscount Fauconberg one of the Deputy Lieutenants of the North Riding of Yorkshire. He died in 1671 and was succeeded at Sizbergh by his elder son Sir Thomas Strickland.

== Family ==
Strickland married Margaret Alford, eldest of the three daughters and co-heiresses of Sir William Alford of Meaux Abbey and Bilton, Yorkshire and his first wife Elizabeth Rookes, and had issue, besides his eldest son Sir Thomas Strickland, another son Walter Strickland, and two daughters, Dorothy, who married Wiliam Grimstone, and Theresa, who married as his second wife John Stafford-Howard, younger son of William Howard, 1st Viscount Stafford.

In the year 1646, an indenture was made between Sir Robert Strickland, and Margaret his wife, Sir Thomas Strickland, their eldest son and heir apparent, Thomas Strickland second brother of Sir Robert, and Walter Strickland third brother of Sir Robert, of the one part; and Sir John Mallory (1610-1655) of Studley Royal, and Richard Aldbrough esquire, of the other part; containing covenants of an intended settlement upon the marriage of Sir Thomas, with Jane Moseley, daughter and co-heiress of Thomas Moseley of Ulleskelf, and widow of Sir Christopher Dawnay, first of the Dawnay Baronets of Cowick. Thomas and Jane had two surviving daughters; she died before 1675. Thomas remarried Winifred Trentham, by whom he had four sons.
