= Jean Dauvin =

- Bishop of Namur
- Diocese: Namur
- See: St Aubin's Cathedral
- Term ended: 1629
- Predecessor: François Buisseret
- Successor: Engelbert Des Bois

Orders
- Consecration: 22 November 1615

Personal details
- Born: 1559 Namur
- Died: 15 September 1629 (aged 69–70) Namur
- Buried: St Aubin's Cathedral, Namur
- Denomination: Roman Catholic
- Parents: Jean d'Auvin and Marie de Monbeek

Jean Dauvin or D'Auvin (1578–1651) was the sixth bishop of Namur (1615–1629). As bishop he faced the tasks of carrying through the reforms of the Council of Trent in his diocese in the wake of the destruction caused by the Dutch Revolt.

== Life ==
Dauvin was born in Namur in 1559, the son of Jean d'Auvin and Marie de Monbeek. He studied civil and canon law, graduating Licentiate of Laws, and was appointed a canon graduate in St Aubin's Cathedral. In 1597, he became archdeacon and vicar general of the diocese. He was named bishop on 15 October 1614, in succession to François Buisseret who had been elected archbishop of Cambrai, and was consecrated on 22 November 1615.

The church of Boneffe Abbey, destroyed by rebel forces during the Revolt, was rebuilt and reconsecrated under his aegis. In 1619 he had offices printed for the saints of his diocese in line with the Roman Breviary, either authoring the propers himself or authorizing them from the Jesuit Gilles du Monin (who went on to write Sacrarium perantiqui comitatus Namurcensis and dedicate it to Dauvin).

In 1620, he reformed the chapter of the cathedral in line with the decrees of the Council of Trent, and in 1625 he held a diocesan synod to push through Tridentine reform in the rural deaneries of his diocese. Dauvin died on 15 September 1629 and was buried in his cathedral.

== See also ==
- Catholic Church in Belgium

Catholic Church titles
Preceded by François Buisseret	Bishop of Namur; 1615–1629	Succeeded by Engelbert Des Bois
