= Boneffe Abbey =

- Abbaye de Boneffe
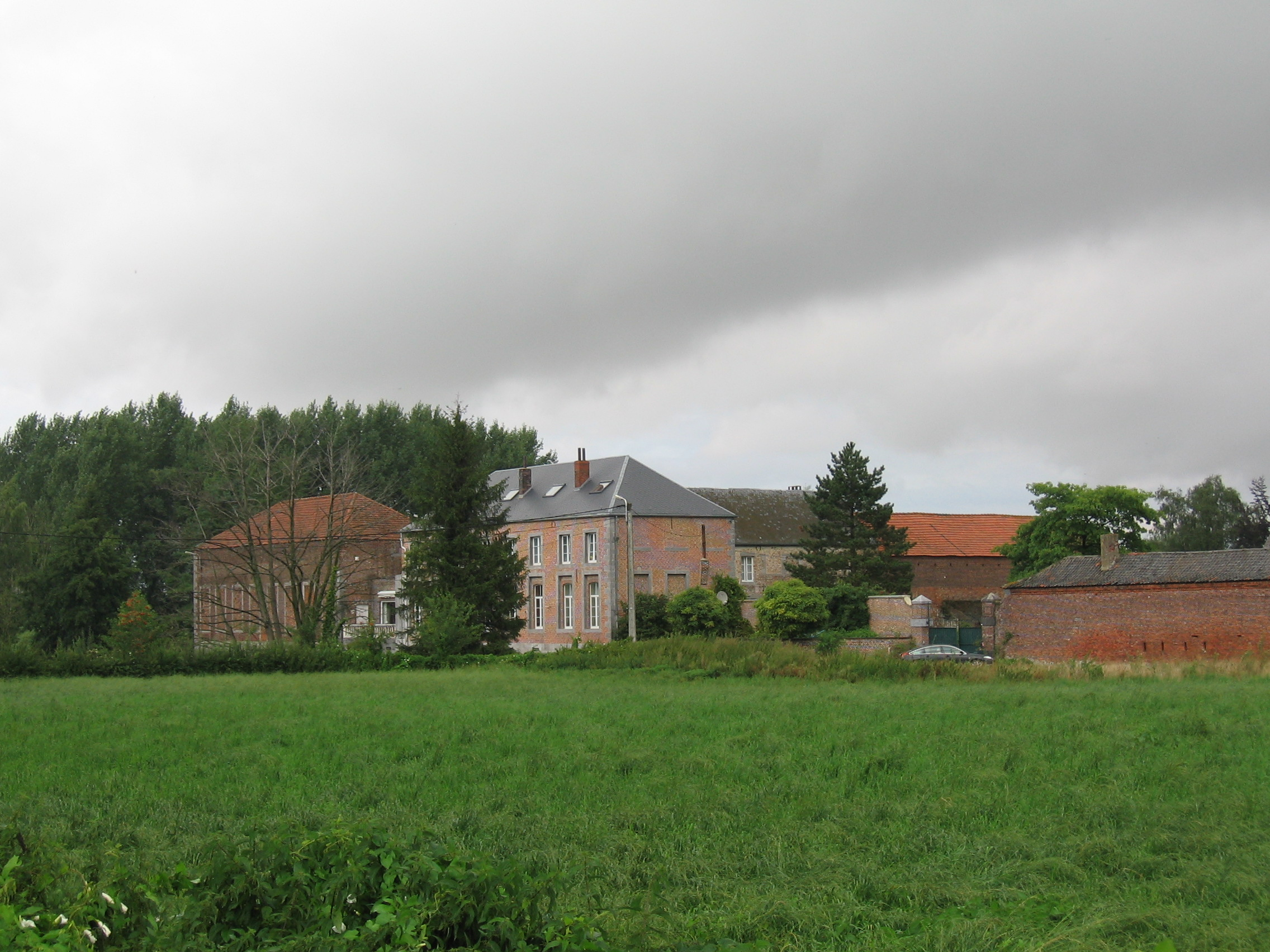
- Former abbot's residence of Boneffe Abbey
- Interactive map of Boneffe Abbey

Monastery information
- Order: Cistercian
- Established: 1222
- Disestablished: 1794
- Diocese: Liège (to 1559); Namur (from 1559)

Architecture
- Functional status: farmhouse
- Heritage designation: listed building

Site
- Coordinates: 50.6205°N 4.9549°E

Boneffe Abbey (French: Abbaye de Boneffe) was, from the early 13th century until the end of the 18th century, a Cistercian monastery on the banks of the Mehaigne in what is now the municipality of Éghezée, Wallonia, Belgium. The abbot's residence, first built in the early 16th century and repaired in the 17th and 18th centuries, is now a listed building that is currently in use as a farmhouse.

== History ==
The earliest attestation to the monastery's existence is a papal bull of 1222. The abbey church was consecrated in 1267. At this period it was a monastery for Cistercian nuns.

In 1413 the community of nuns was disbanded, and by 1461 the Cistercian Order had redesignated the property as a monastery for monks. The house was briefly evacuated in 1480-1483 due to an outbreak of plague. In November 1568, early in the Dutch Revolt, the abbey and its church were set on fire by rebel forces. The community fled and the abbot, Cornelis Lievens, died in Leuven in 1569. Rebuilding began in 1589, and the church was reconsecrated in 1617 by Jean Dauvin, bishop of Namur.

The monastery was on the front lines of the War of the Spanish Succession, just a few miles from Ramillies, and suffered depredations and damage accordingly. Fresh rebuilding work was completed in 1711.

After the French invasion of the Southern Netherlands, the revolutionaries suppressed Boneffe Abbey along with all other religious houses.
