= Alban of Mainz =

Missionary and martyr

Saint Alban
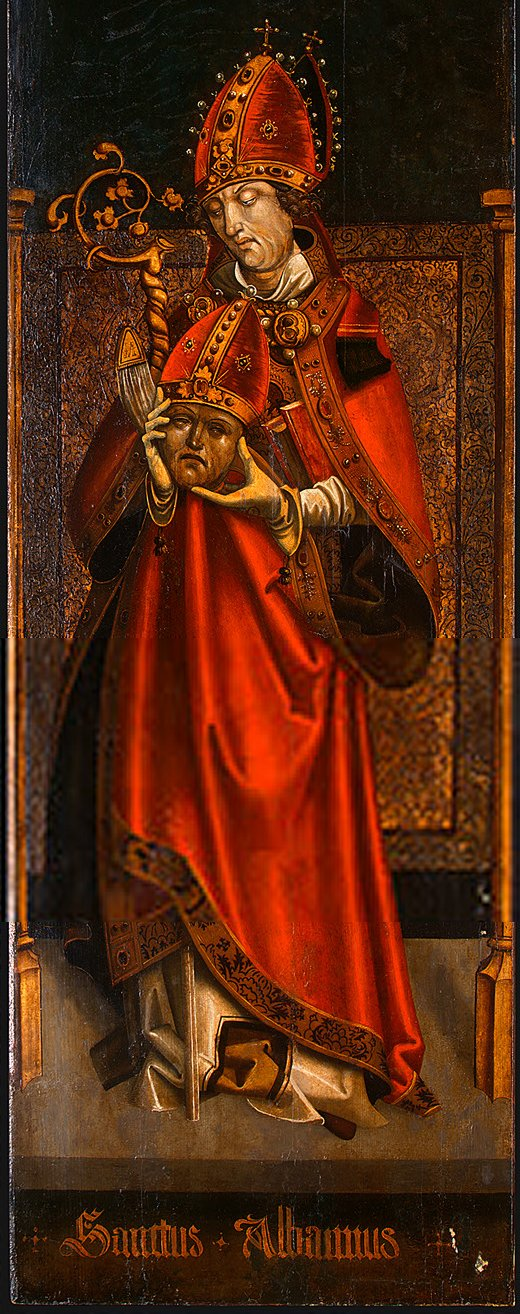
- Alban of Mainz on an anonymous Tyrolean painting c. 1500–1525.
- Born: 4th century
- Died: 5th century Mainz
- Venerated in: Roman Catholic Church; Eastern Orthodox Church
- Feast: 21 June
- Attributes: Depicted holding his head in his hands (beheaded)
- Patronage: hernia, epilepsy, gravel, kidney stones

Alban of Mainz (Latin: Albanus or Albinus; supposedly died in or near Mainz) was a Catholic priest, missionary, and martyr in the Late Roman Empire. He is venerated as Saint Alban of Mainz in the Catholic Church, not to be confused with Saint Alban of Verulamium.

== Sources ==
Nothing is known for certain about Alban, about whom no contemporary sources survive.

=== Confusion with Alban of Verulamium ===
There is evidence that, at various points in the Middle Ages, he was confused with the British Saint Alban, who died at Verulamium (now St Albans, Hertfordshire, England) around the year 300; later sources claim that both Albans had been killed by beheading, and both are always depicted with their head in their hands, and their feast days are 21 June and 22 June, respectively. English Catholic hagiographer Alban Butler observed in 1759 that early modern scholars Thomas More (Confutation of Tyndale's Answer, 1532) and Thierry Ruinart (Historia persecutionis vandalicae, 1694) still equated or mixed up both Albans, while noting that Rabanus (c. 845) had distinguished them. It's also possible that some elements of Alban of Mainz's life got mixed up with those of Alban/Albin of Rome/Cologne (beheaded; feast: 22 June), Alban of Silenen (beheaded), Albinus of Angers (c. 470–550; feast: 1 March) and Albin of Vercelli (feast: 1 March).

=== Martyrologium of Rabanus ===
The oldest surviving substantial source about Alban of Mainz is the Martyrologium (c. 845) of Rabanus Maurus, which had two separate entries for the Mainzer Alban and the English Alban. Concerning Alban of Mainz, he wrote:

21 June: The martyr Alban from [our] native Moguntia [Mainz], who during the reign of emperor Theodosius went forward from the island of Namsia with the saint Theonestus and Ursus, and reached Mediolanum [Milan], and from there he went out and, with the help of the Lord, he arrived in the provinces of Gaul, and stayed there in the Saviour's name, willing to suffer martyrdom in the service of God. But after martyrdom took the blessed Ursus in the city of Augusta, Theonestus arrived with Alban in Moguntiacum [Mainz]; while preaching the word of God there, his pupil Alban fulfilled martyrdom, and was buried there, near the city. (Note: XI KAL. In Moguntia natalis Albani martyris, qui sub Theodosio imperatore de insula Namsia pergens cum sancto Theonesto et Urso Mediolanum venit, indeque exiens, auxiliante Domino, pervenit ad Gallias, et in servitio Dei manens ad martyrium pro nomine Salvatoris promptus. Postquam autem in Augusta civitate beatus Ursus martyrium accepit, Theonestus cum Albano Moguntiacum pervenit, dumque ibi praedicaret verbum Dei, Albanus, discipulus eius, martyrium explevit, et sepultus est ibi iuxta civitatem.)

— Rabanus Maurus, Martyrologium. Iunius (c. 845)

=== Passio sancti Albani of Gozwin ===
The second substantial source is the Passio sancti Albani, an incomplete hagiography written in the 1060s or 1070s by schoolmaster Gozwin, who lamented that very little evidence about Alban had survived to his day. Gozwin's account is much longer and adds many elements not found in Rabanus' Martyrologium, including a prologue about the First Council of Nicaea (325) which condemned Arianism, that nevertheless persisted until Honorius and Arcadius succeeded Theodosius (395). At that time, Alban is mentioned as one of four disciples of Theonestus, the others being Ursus, Tabraha and Tabratha. These five Catholic clerics are forced to flee from North Africa to Italy after being persecuted by Huneric, the fiercely Arian king of the Vandals (who historically ruled 80 years later in 477–484, however), travelling to Ambrose, bishop of Milan (r. 374–397; died 80 years before Huneric became king). The most wise Ambrose teaches Theonestus and his disciples refined theology and sends them out to convert the 'Arian beasts' in Gaul and Germany. They pass a city called Augusta primae Retiae, where Ursus is killed by Arians, and Alban is eventually beheaded in Mainz by local Arians to whom he was preaching the Catholic doctrine of the Trinity. The legend finishes by narrating that Alban carried his head on his hands to the place where he wanted to be buried.

Heinz Thomas (1970) demonstrated how the Passio was written with a political goal: in the service of his lord Siegfried I, archbishop of Mainz, Gozwin presented the archbishop of Mainz as the primate of all Christians in Germany and Gaul, and framed the lives of Alban, Theonastus, Boniface and other Mainzer clerics in ways to prove this point. The Passio sancti Albani was written in order to counter the archbishop of Trier's claim to primacy, and was riddled with legend and fiction about the history of the city and diocese of Mainz – part of which was actually derived from that of Trier – to accomplish this goal.

== Attempts at reconstruction ==
The accounts of Alban's life widely contradict each other in dating, geography, characters and acts, while other elements remain unclear; this has led scholars to create significantly divergent reconstructions of Alban.

=== Dating ===
It is sometimes assumed that he died in or near Mainz around the year 400 (Watkins 2015), but others claim he died much later, around 483 (Hirschel 1855). Still others base themselves on a 10th-century vita of his teacher Theonistus, which claims that Alban was martyred in Mainz before Theonistus was martyred near Altinum on 30 October 380. As the death of Ambrose (397) and the reign of Huneric (r. 477–483) are well-known from other sources, this means Gozwin's claim that Theonistus and his disciples visited Ambrose in Milan after they were expelled from Africa by Huneric cannot be historically correct. The Vandal Kingdom in Africa was not established until 435 by Gaiseric, who died in 477, and Gozwin specifies it was ruled by Huneric Wandalorum Rex post Gezericum patrem ('Huneric, King of the Vandals after his father Gaiseric').

=== Geography ===
Aside from Milan and Mainz, all other locations mentioned by the sources are contested. A few authors have attempted to deduce from Alban's personal name that he was either from Albania or a city called 'Alba'. Some writers assert that the island of Namsia, also written Nausia, is to be equated with Naxos in the Aegean Sea, while others state that they are not sure about this identification, or that they have no idea where to locate it because it doesn't seem to have existed. Neither is it clear whether this Namsia was the birthplace of Alban, or (part of) the diocese of Theonistus, while others identify the latter as bishop of Philippi, a city 450 kilometres north of Naxos. Many writers doubt or outright reject Gozwin's assertion that Alban and Theonistus had been active in North Africa at the time of Vandal king Huneric on chronological grounds and the fact that Rabanus doesn't mention this episode. Finally, the city of Augusta or Augusta primae Retiae, in which Ursus is said to have been killed, has been interpreted as Augusta Treverorum (modern Trier, near Mainz), Augusta Vindelicorum (modern Augsburg in Bavaria) or Augusta Praetoria Salassorum (modern Aosta in northwestern Italy). Mark Welser, a scholar from Augsburg, argued in 1594 that Augusta (primae Retiae) had to be Augsburg, whilst Henricus Canisius from Nijmegen responded in his 1614 reprint of the Passio sancti Albani that some other authors had arguments in favour of Aosta.

=== General ===
Daniel Papebroch (1722) concluded that Alban had been killed by 'heretical' Arians on 21 June 404, when Aureus was the bishop of Mainz. Alban Butler (1759) noted that Papebroch and Jean Mabillon claimed Alban was an African bishop who, because of his Catholic faith, was banished from the Vandal Kingdom by the Arian monarch Huneric, after which he settled in Mainz, where he was captured by the Huns and executed because of his faith. However, Butler favoured the viewpoint of Ruinart (1694) and Georgi (1745) that Alban was not from Africa.

According to Schaab (1844), Alban came to Mainz around 404 to convert Arians to Catholicism, but they decapitated him at Gartenfeld.

Hirschel (1855) alleged that both Alban and bishop Theonistus were expelled from Africa by the Arian Vandalic king Huneric, and that Mainz had no bishop when they arrived to proselytise the local Arians, who proceeded to expel Theonistus and behead Alban in Gartenfeld around 483.

Stadler (1858) remarked that the Hunnic destruction of Mainz (during which bishop Aureus was allegedly killed) occurred in 451 (just before the Battle of the Catalaunian Plains), not in 404 as some authors claimed, thereby rejecting the assertion that Alban was killed by Huns.

A timeline of Mainz constructed by Franz Falk (chaplain at Worms) for the Nassauische Annalen (1873) put the killing of bishop Aureus during the Hunnic sack of Mainz on 16 June 403, the killing of Alban by the Huns on 21 June 406, and the Crossing of the Rhine (by Alans and Gepids) on 31 December 406, based on Rabanus' Martyrologium, Gozwin's Passio, Prosper of Aquitaine's chronicle and Jerome's Epistola ad Ageruchiam. Falk explained the 'Arian persecution' mentioned by Gozwin and Sigehart as meaning that the Huns were Arians, and their persecution was 'both political and religious'.

Smith & Wace (1877) wrote: "Albanus of Mentz, martyred at Mentz no one knows when, according to Baeda under Diocletian also, according to Sigebert (in Chron.), who says he had been driven from Philippi with Theonistus its bishop, in 425, and respecting whom Rabanus Maurus goes so far abroad as to call [Alban] an African bishop flying from Hunneric..."

Häuptli (2003) argued that Alban's cult became associated with that of Theonistus, who may have been a bishop of Philippi but who was confused with Thaumastus, a 5th-century bishop of Mainz.

Pelizaeus (2012) claimed that Mainz was conquered by the Vandals, Suebi and Burgundians in 406, during which Alban was killed.

In Watkins' reconstruction (2015), Alban was a Greek priest from the isle of Naxos, who was exiled by the Arians to Mainz, where he became a missionary; the local Arians killed him around 400.

== Legacy ==
A church and monastery were built in Mainz in 804 to honour Alban. A map of Fulda from 786 seems to have already mentioned a chapel in Mainz dedicated to Alban. It became the centre of Saint Alban's Abbey, a large Benedictine monastery, which was renovated by Charlemagne around 805. The monastery was devastated in 1557 and never renewed.

Albert II, Count of Namur founded the collegiate church of St. Alban at Namur in 1047. When the Diocese of Namur was created in 1559, it was expanded as St Aubin's Cathedral, which claims to possess relics of Alban of Mainz. He used to be commonly venerated in Wallonia, but barely in Flanders and the Netherlands. Alban was a rare example of a saint who was invoked for calamities in general rather than for a specific domain of problems that Catholics were dealing with.

Both Alban of Mainz and Alban of Verulamium are represented in art as carrying their head between their hands, having been beheaded.
