= Engelbert Des Bois =

- Bishop of Namur
- Diocese: Namur
- See: St Aubin's Cathedral
- Installed: 1630
- Term ended: 1651
- Predecessor: Jean Dauvin
- Successor: Jean de Wachtendonck

Orders
- Consecration: 7 July 1630

Personal details
- Born: 9 July 1578 Brussels, Duchy of Brabant
- Died: 15 July 1651 (aged 73) Abbey of Saint-Gérard in Brogne
- Denomination: Roman Catholic

Engelbert Des Bois (1578–1651) was the seventh bishop of Namur (1630–1651).

== Life ==
Des Bois was born in Brussels on 9 July 1578 to parents from Burgundy. He studied civil law and canon law, taking the degree of licentiate of laws, and became a canon and later archdeacon of Cambrai Cathedral.

From 1618 to 1629 he was provost of the collegiate church of St Pierre in Lille.

In 1629 he was named bishop of Namur, and he was installed in 1630. As bishop he was one of the representatives of the First Estate of the County of Namur in the Estates General of 1632.

Urban VIII issued the papal bull In eminenti in 1641, condemning a number of propositions drawn from the writings of Cornelius Jansenius. In 1643 Des Bois was the first bishop in the Habsburg Netherlands to publish the bull, which he did without government permission. This led to a period of troubled relations with the civil authorities.

On 28 May 1645 he consecrated the new Jesuit church in Namur.

He died on 15 July 1651, at the Abbey of Saint-Gérard de Brogne.

== Publications ==
- Praxis bonarum intentionum (Douai, J. Bogardus, 1619), reprinted Vienna, 1620.
- Decreta synodi diocoesanae Namurcensis, habitae in capella episcopali die septima junii anni M.DC.XXXIX (Namur, Joannes van Must, 1639).

Catholic Church titles
Preceded by Jean Dauvin	Bishop of Namur; 1630–1651	Succeeded by Jean de Wachtendonck
