= Thomas Strickland (Cavalier) =

English royalist soldier and Royalist (1621–1694)

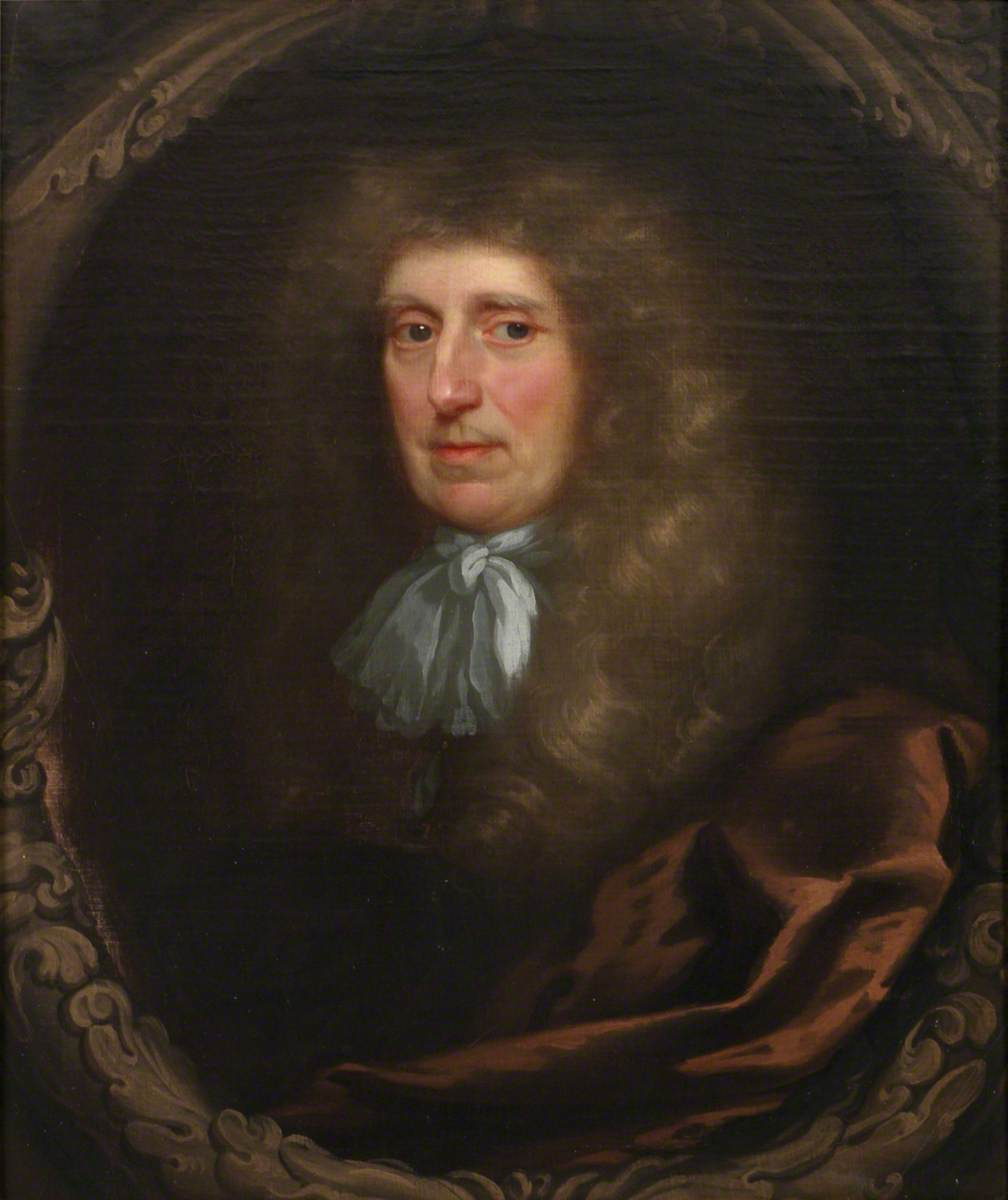
Sir Thomas Strickland of Sizergh (1621 - 1691). Attributed to Jacob Huysmans (c.1633-1696)

Sir Thomas Strickland PC (baptised 16 November 1621 – 8 January 1694) was an English politician and soldier. He supported the Royalist cause in the English Civil War, being knighted for his gallantry at the Battle of Edgehill.

After the Restoration, he was a member of Parliament for Westmorland (1661–77), as well as attending the courts of Charles II and later James II. After the Glorious Revolution of 1688, he accompanied James II when the latter left for France. He died in Rouen six years later.

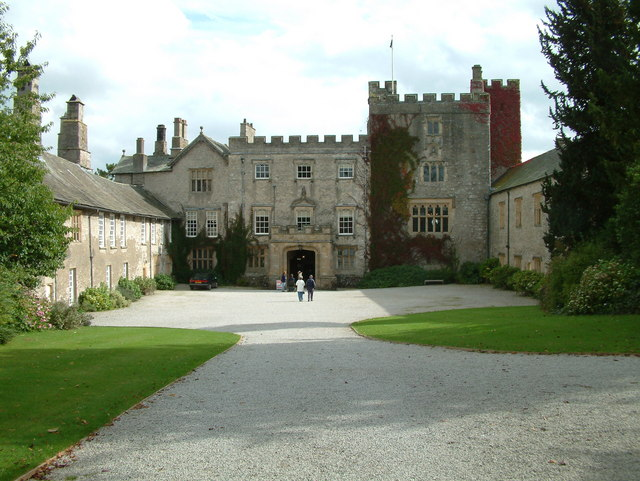
Sizergh Castle, the Strickland family home

== Biography ==
He was the eldest son of Sir Robert Strickland of Sizergh and his wife Margaret Alford, daughter of Sir William Alford of Meaux Abbey. He matriculated from St. Alban Hall, Oxford, at age 16 and then studied at Gray's Inn.

At Edgehill, the first pitched battle of the First English Civil War, Thomas Strickland commanded the regiment of foot while his father Sir Robert Strickland commanded a regiment of horse. For his gallantry, Thomas Strickland was made knight banneret by King Charles I in person, on the field at Edgehill, 23 October 1642.

After the Restoration of Charles II, Sir Thomas was Member of Parliament for the county of Westmorland in the Cavalier Parliament of 1661 until 1676 when he was expelled as a Popish recusant. The Stricklands were a Catholic family, but J.P. Kenyon believes that Sir Thomas was outwardly a Protestant when elected to the House of Commons, and later converted to Catholicism sometime after 1661. Ultimately the Test Act 1673, requiring them to acknowledge the King as head of the Church, made it impossible for the few remaining Catholics in Parliament to retain their seats. He had not been active in the House, speaking only once (against the impeachment of Clarendon) and declined to speak up in his own defence during the Common debate on whether to expel him. As rewards for his loyalty to the Crown, he was granted the salt duty for 20 years, and given the post of Sub-Commissioner of Prizes. Also, he shared with Sir John Reresby a 14-year monopoly on the production of steel. The anonymous author (probably Andrew Marvell) of Flagellum Parliamentarium, a contemporary publication which listed many of the pensioners of the Cavalier Parliament, described these rewards as bribes, given not for previous loyalty, but for supporting the court party in the post-restoration parliament.

During the Popish Plot, he was vulnerable to attack as an open Papist, but his age and ill health made him an unlikely conspirator and his record of loyalty to the Crown preserved him from danger. A search of Sizergh Castle for arms produced only a few remnants of his Civil War armour, and he further secured his safety by swearing an oath to defend the King against all his enemies, domestic and foreign, even the Pope himself.

Sir Thomas was Keeper of the Privy Purse to Charles II and a member of the Privy Council of James II, and following the downfall of James in 1688 he and his family went into exile with him.

He and his wife remained with the exiled court at Saint-Germain-en-Laye until 1692, and then moved to Rouen, where he died on 8 January 1694, and was buried there. Sir Thomas was succeeded in his estates by his eldest son, Walter, who had been able to recover Sizergh, through the common (though technically illegal) device of creating a trust by which the lands were made over to Protestant neighbours, who later reconveyed them to him.

== Family ==
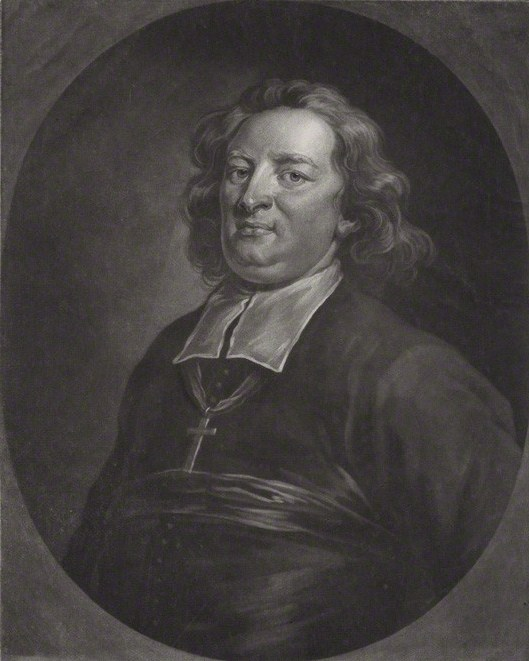
Sir Thomas's son Thomas John Francis, Bishop of Namur

Sir Thomas Strickland married firstly in 1646, Jane, daughter and co-heiress of Thomas Moseley of Ulleskelf, in the county of Yorkshire, and widow of Sir Christopher Dawnay, first of the Dawnay baronets, by whom he had two surviving daughters:

- Alice, married Sir Walter Kirkham Blount, 3rd of the Blount Baronets, of Sodington Hall and Mauly, in the county of Worcestershire, but died without issue
- Anne, married John Middleton of Stockeld Park, but died without issue.

Sir Thomas married secondly, Winifred (1645–1725), daughter and co-heiress of Sir Christopher Trentham of Rocester Abbey, in the county of Staffordshire, and had issue:

- Walter (1675–1715), who inherited Sizergh
- Robert (1679–1713) died unmarried
- Roger (1680–1704), who was page to the Prince of Conti when he went from France to be elected King of Poland. Roger Strickland died unmarried at 24 years old.
- Thomas (1682–1740) who became Bishop of Namur. He was sent as sheriff to Victoria District by the Emperor Charles VI in 1734, and was an unofficial agent of the English government to the Vatican. He died at Namur in 1740 and was buried in his own cathedral.
