= Jean de Wachtendonck =

Joannes Wachtendonck
- Bishop of Namur
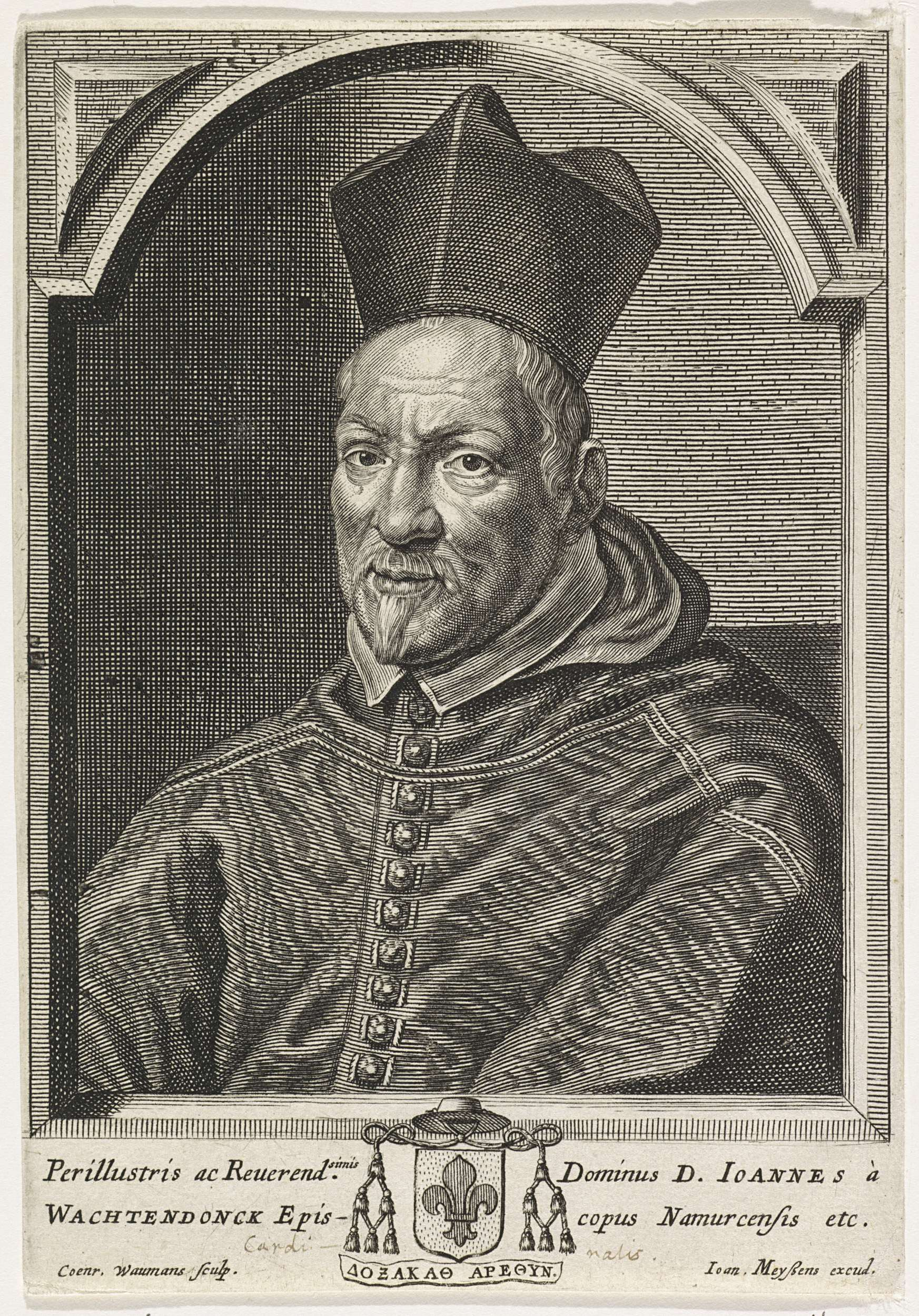
- Province: Cambrai
- Diocese: Namur
- Predecessor: Engelbert Des Bois
- Successor: Ignace Schetz de Grobbendonk
- Other post: Archbishop of Mechelen (briefly in 1668)

Orders
- Consecration: 13 December 1654

Personal details
- Born: 1592 Mechelen
- Died: 25 June 1668 (aged 75–76) Brussels
- Denomination: Roman Catholic
- Education: Leuven University
- Motto: La gloire suit la vertue

Jean de Wachtendonck, Latinized Joannes (1592–1668) was the eighth bishop of Namur, in the Spanish Netherlands (now in Belgium).

== Life ==
Wachtendonck was born in Mechelen. He studied at Leuven University and graduated Licentiate of Theology in 1616. He became a canon of St Rumbold's Cathedral, an ecclesiastical councillor of the Great Council of Mechelen, vicar general and ecclesiastical councillor of the Brussels Council of State.

In February 1634 he delivered a formal eulogy of Isabella Clara Eugenia (died December 1633) in the cathedral, published as Oratio funebris Isabellae Clarae Eugeniae Hispaniarum infantis.

In 1651 he was named bishop of Namur, but his installation was delayed until 1654 due to suspicions of Jansenism. In Namur he founded a diocesan seminary and held a diocesan synod for the reform of the clergy. He reported favourably to Pope Alexander VII on the cause for the beatification of the Martyrs of Gorcum.

In April 1668 he succeeded Andreas Creusen as archbishop of Mechelen but died in Brussels on the way to his new see.

== Works ==
His eulogy of the Infanta Isabella was published as:

- Oratio funebris Isabellae Clarae Eugeniae Hispaniarum infantis (Brussels: Jean Pepermans, 1634)

He was also the author of a life of St Rumbold:

- Vita, passio, et miracula S. Rumoldi archiepiscopi Dublinensis, Apostoli Mechliniensis & martyris (Mechelen: Henry Jaye, 1638)
  - Het leven 't lyden ende mirakelen vanden H. Rombout, translated by Franchoys vanden Bossche (Mechelen: Henry Jaye, 1639)

Catholic Church titles
Preceded by Engelbert Des Bois	Bishop of Namur; 1654–1668	Succeeded by Ignace Schetz de Grobbendonk
Preceded by Andreas Creusen	6th Archbishop of Mechelen; 1668	Succeeded by Alphonse de Berghes
