= Paul-Godefroi de Berlo de Franc-Douaire =

Paul-Godefroi de Berlo de Franc-Douaire (1701—1771) was the thirteenth bishop of Namur.

== Life ==
Berlo was born at Franc-Douaire Castle, in the Prince-Bishopric of Liège, on 22 September 1701, as the son of Paul-Marie and Marie-Albertine de Berlo. Engaging in an ecclesiastical career, he became a canon of Huy and provost of Nivelles. In December 1746, Pope Benedict XIV confirmed his appointment as bishop of Namur. He dedicated his energies and his fortune to repairing the damage and disorder caused in his diocese by the armies of Louis XV during the War of the Austrian Succession, including the rebuilding of Namur cathedral itself.

He died at Nivelles on 19 January 1771.
