= Pierre Warin =

Pierre Warin (Rocourt, 15 June 1948) is a Belgian cleric and a bishop of the Roman Catholic Church.

Warin attended the seminary in Liège and subsequently studied at the Université catholique de Louvain and at the Pontifical Gregorian University in Rome. He was ordained a priest on December 23, 1972. In 1980 he received his PhD from the Gregorianum with a thesis on the Protestant theologian Wolfhart Pannenberg. Between 1977 and 1982, Warin taught moral theology at the Namur seminary. In 1982 he was appointed professor of New Testament exegesis at the Major Seminary of Liège. In addition to his teaching assignment, he worked in pastoral care. From 1990 to 1994 he was a pastor in Nudorp. In 1998 he became canon of the cathedral chapter of St. Paul's in Liège. Warin was appointed auxiliary bishop of Namur and titular bishop of Tongeren on 8 July 2004; his episcopal consecration took place on 26 September 2004. Warin chose as his motto: Virtus in infirmitate perficitur (My power is made perfect in weakness - 2 Corinthians 12:9). His appointment as Bishop of Namur followed on 5 June 2019; he was the successor to Rémy Vancottem who had retired.

On 6 October 2025 Pope Leo XIV accepted Warin's resignation. He was succeeded by Fabien Lejeusne.

Catholic Church titles
Preceded by Rémy Vancottem	Bishop of Namur; 5 June 2019-6 October 2025	Succeeded by Fabien Lejeusne
