= Rémy Vancottem =

Roman Catholic bishop

Coat of arms of Rémy Vancottem.

Rémy Victor Vancottem (born 25 July 1943) is a Belgian Roman Catholic prelate, who served as the bishop of Namur (20 June 2010 - 5 June 2019). He had previously served as an auxiliary bishop of Mechelen-Brussels.

Vancottem was born at Tubize, Walloon Brabant. He first studied to be a teacher, then supplemented those studies with those of philosophy and theology at the Seminary of Malines. He attended the Catholic University of Louvain, where he earned a degree in psychology. He was ordained a priest 27 June 1969 for the Archdiocese of Malines-Brussels.

In September 1974 he became board member of the Major Seminary in Brussels, team leader for continuing education of clergy in Brussels and Walloon Brabant, and founder and co-responsible group ANIME (Association for the training of lay apostolate in Brussels and Walloon Brabant). He was appointed titular bishop of Unizibira by Pope John Paul II on 15 February 1982 and was consecrated on 21 March, he became auxiliary of Malines-Brussels office of Vicar General for the Walloon Brabant.

On 31 May 2010 he was appointed as the bishop of Namur to fill the vacancy left by Archbishop Leonard who has been appointed primate of Belgium and archbishop of Mechelen-Brussels. He was installed on 20 June 2010.

Catholic Church titles
| Preceded by André-Joseph Léonard | Bishop of Namur; 20 June 2010–5 June 2019 | Succeeded by Pierre Warin |
