= Winifred, Lady Strickland =

Jacobite courtier (1645–1725)

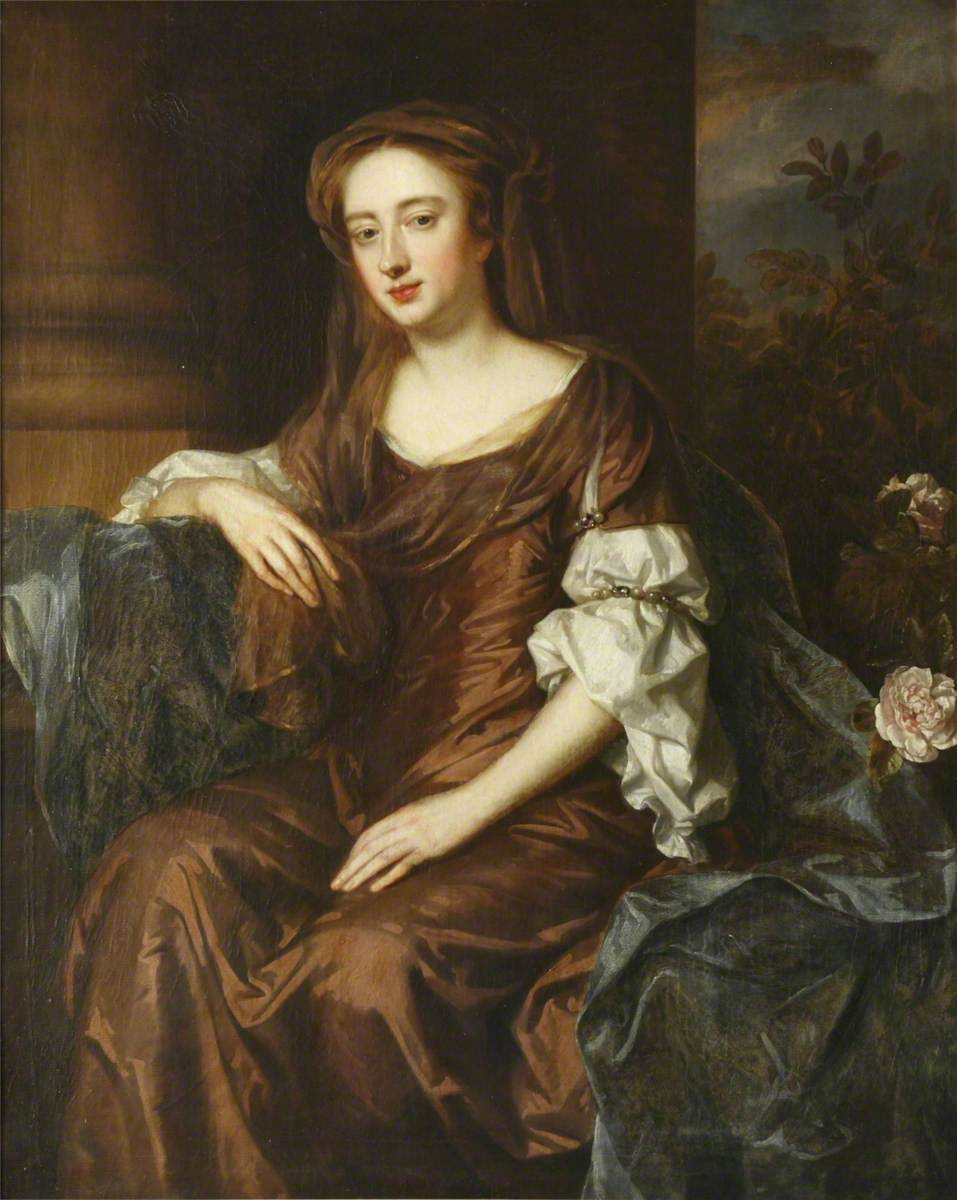

Winifred, Lady Strickland (1645–1725) was a member of the Jacobite court in exile.

== Life ==
Winifred, the daughter of Sir Christopher Trentham and Winifred Biddulph, was baptized at Rocester, Staffordshire, on 19 May 1645. She married the widower Sir Thomas Strickland, of Sizergh Castle, Westmorland, in 1674. Sir Thomas already had two daughters from his previous marriage. Together the couple had five sons, including Thomas, a future bishop of Namur.

Lady Strickland was present at the birth of James, prince of Wales, in June 1688 and was appointed his under-governess. Her husband became a member of the Privy Council of England in July. In the wake of the Dutch invasion, she was among the servants who secretly accompanied Mary of Modena and the prince of Wales to France in December 1688.

Sir Thomas and Lady Strickland remained courtiers at the royal court in exile at St Germain-en-Laye, Winifred now responsible for the prince's upbringing. They resigned from court and retired to Rouen in 1692 for health reasons. After Sir Thomas's death in 1694, Winifred returned to court and resumed her task as the prince's governess until he reached the age of seven. She then returned to England until 1700, recovering the family's property and consolidating its finances. On return to St Germain-en-Laye she was appointed Woman of the Bedchamber to the exiled queen. She was an early patron of the portraitist Alexis Simon Belle, and acquired an important collection of portraits of the Jacobite court. After the queen's death in 1718, she retired to the Poor Clare convent in Rouen, where her husband and her eldest son were buried. She died there on 17 April 1725 and was buried with them.
