= Jacques Blaseus =

Jacques Blaseus O.F.M. Rec.
- Bishop of Saint-Omer
- Diocese: Saint-Omer
- See: Cathédrale Notre-Dame de Saint-Omer
- In office: 1601–1618
- Previous posts: Bishop of Namur, 1597–1601

Orders
- Consecration: 23 November 1597 by Ottavio Mirto Frangipani

Personal details
- Born: Jacques de Blaese c.1540 Bruges, County of Flanders, Habsburg Netherlands
- Died: 21 March 1618 Saint-Omer, County of Artois, Spanish Netherlands
- Buried: Saint-Omer Cathedral

Jacques Blaseus (c.1540–1618) was successively bishop of Namur and bishop of Saint-Omer in the Spanish Netherlands.

== Life ==
Jacques de Blaese, born in Bruges around 1540, came from a poor family and was educated at a charity school in Bruges until his abilities brought him to the attention of generous patrons, who provided him with the means for an education in the humanities. As a youth he joined the Franciscans in Douai, eventually serving as provincial superior of the order in the Low Countries. He was named bishop of Namur by letters patent of Philip II of Spain dated 11 May 1596. The nomination was confirmed by Pope Clement VIII in 1597, and Blaseus was consecrated bishop by the papal nuncio, Ottavio Mirto Frangipani, on 23 November. On 31 December 1598 he delivered a funeral oration for Philip II in the Collegiate Church of St. Michael and St. Gudula (now Brussels cathedral).

Late in the year 1600, the Archdukes Albert and Isabella appointed him bishop of Saint-Omer. He took possession of the new see on 19 April 1601. He died in Saint-Omer on 21 March 1618 and was buried in his cathedral. He bequeathed his library to the church.

Catholic Church titles
Preceded by Jean Dave	Bishop of Namur; 1597–1601	Succeeded by François Buisseret
Preceded by Jean de Vernois	Bishop of Saint-Omer; 1601–1618	Succeeded by Paul Jacques Boudot
