= Katholiek Nieuwsblad =

The Katholiek Nieuwsblad ("Catholic newspaper") is a Roman Catholic newspaper published every Friday in the Netherlands. In 2008, the newspaper had 13,500 subscribers.

The Katholiek Nieuwsblad includes news, opinions, and an overview of the key points of the papal audiences. The paper is not bound to any particular Dutch region. It is also distributed in the Flanders region of Belgium. The newspaper is considered to be of a conservative signature.
