= Ferdinand de Berlo de Brus =

Count Ferdinand de Berlo (1654—1725), lord of Brus and Chokier, was the eleventh bishop of Namur in Belgium.

== Life ==
Berlo was born in Namur, the son of Jean, Count of Berlo, and Anne-Marguerite-Ursule de Berlo d'Hozémont. After studying Philosophy at Leuven University, and Law in Ingolstadt and Rome, he became a canon of Liège Cathedral. In December 1697, Pope Innocent XII confirmed his appointment as bishop of Namur.

As bishop he had a compendium of the synodal decrees of the diocese published, Decreta et statuta omnium synodorum diocesanarum Namurcensium (Namur, C. G. Albert, 1720).

He died at Chokier Castle on 24 August 1725.
