= Dawnay baronets =

Extinct baronetcy in the Baronetage of England

The Dawnay Baronetcy, of East Cowick in the County of Yorkshire, was a title in the Baronetage of England. It was created on 19 May 1642 for Christopher Dawnay. The title became extinct on the death of his infant son, Sir Thomas, the second Baronet, in 1644. Sir Christopher's widow, Jane Moseley of Ulleskelf, remarried Sir Thomas Strickland in 1646. John Dawnay, brother of the first Baronet, was created Viscount Downe in 1680.

== Dawnay baronets, of Cowick (1642) ==
- Sir Christopher Dawnay, 1st Baronet (c. 1620–1644)
- Sir Thomas Dawnay, 2nd Baronet (1644–1644)

== See also ==
- Viscount Downe (1680 creation)
