= Guy Haarscher =

Belgian philosopher (born 1946)

- Born: 1946 (age 79–80); Belgium
- Title: Ordinary Professor
- Website: https://www.eiuc.org/education/ema/universities/ema-directors/prof-guy-haarscher.html

Guy Haarscher (born 1946 in Belgium) is a professor of legal and political philosophy at the Free University of Brussels (ULB). He taught every other year from 1985 to 2008 at Duke University School of Law as an adjunct professor of law. He also taught at the Central European University in Budapest from 1992 to 2008 as a recurrent visiting professor. Guy Haarscher currently teaches at the ULB, as well as at the College of Europe in Bruges.

== Awards ==
- 1989: Prix des Droits de l'Homme de la Communauté française de Belgique for Philosophie des droits de l'homme', Editions de l'Université Libre de Bruxelles, 4e édition 1989.
- 1982: Prix Duculot de l'Académie Royale de Belgique (Classe des Lettres), 1981, for L'ontologie de Marx,

== Publications ==
=== Books ===
- La laïcité Paris : Presses universitaires de France, 2004 ISBN 978-2-13-053915-5. 205 copies in American and UK libraries, according to
  - Polish translation "Laickość : Kościół, państwo, religia", 2004
- Le fantôme de la liberté : la servitude volontaire de l'homme moderne. Bruxelles: Editions Labor, 1997. ISBN 978-2-8040-1187-1
- Les Médias entre droit et pouvoir : redéfinir la liberté de la presse 1995.
- Après le communisme : les bouleversements de la théorie politique 1993
- Chaim Perelman et la pensée contemporaine 1993
- Laïcité et droits de l'homme : deux siècles de conquêtes 1989
- Philosophie des droits de l'homme 2. ed. Editions de l'Université de Bruxelles, 1989 ISBN 978-2-8004-0963-4
- La raison du plus fort : philosophie du politique 1988
- L'ontologie de Marx : le problème de l'action, des textes de jeunesse à l'œuvre de maturité 1980
- Philosophie des droits de l'homme 1957

== Peer-reviewed articles ==
- "Freedom of Religion in Context". Brigham Young University Law Review. 2002, no. 2: 269–281.
- "Perelman and Habermas" Law and Philosophy, Dec., 1986, vol. 5, no. 3, p. 331–342
