= Diocese of Namur =

Catholic ecclesiastical territory in Belgium

Coordinates: 50°27′49″N 4°51′33″E

Diocese of Namur Dioecesis Namurcensis Diocèse de Namur (French) Bistum Namur (German) Bisdom Namen (Dutch)

Catholic
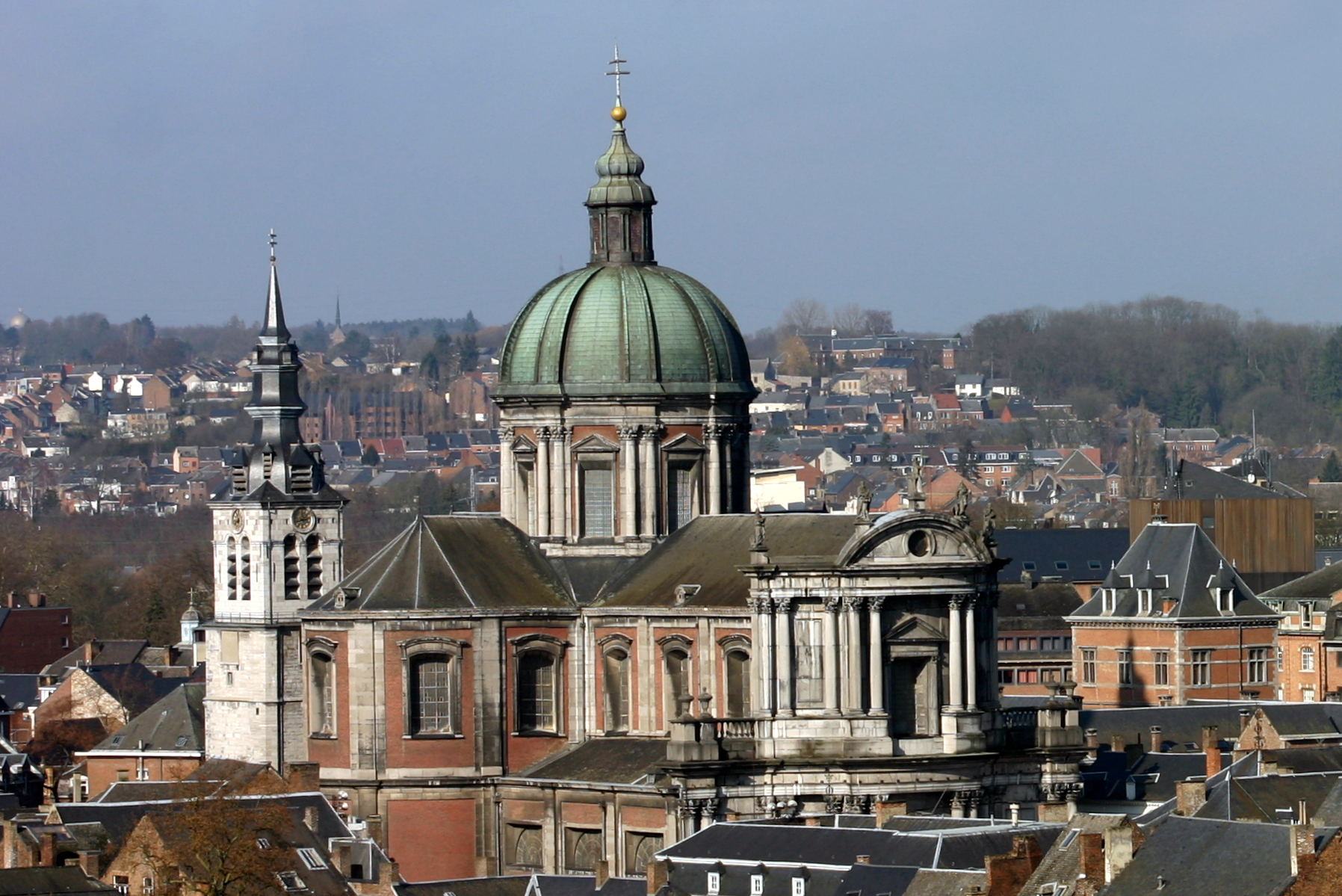
- St. Aubin's Cathedral in Namur

Location
- Country: Belgium
- Ecclesiastical province: Mechelen-Brussels
- Metropolitan: Archdiocese of Mechelen-Brussels

Statistics
- Area: 8,100 km^{2} (3,100 sq mi)
- Population: Total; Catholics: (as of 2019); 776,000; 504,000 (64.9%)

Information
- Denomination: Catholic Church
- Sui iuris church: Latin Church
- Rite: Roman Rite
- Established: 12 May 1559
- Cathedral: St. Aubin's Cathedral in Namur

Current leadership
- Pope: Leo XIV
- Bishop: Fabien Lejeusne
- Metropolitan Archbishop: Luc Terlinden
- Bishops emeritus: Rémy Vancottem, Pierre Warin

Map
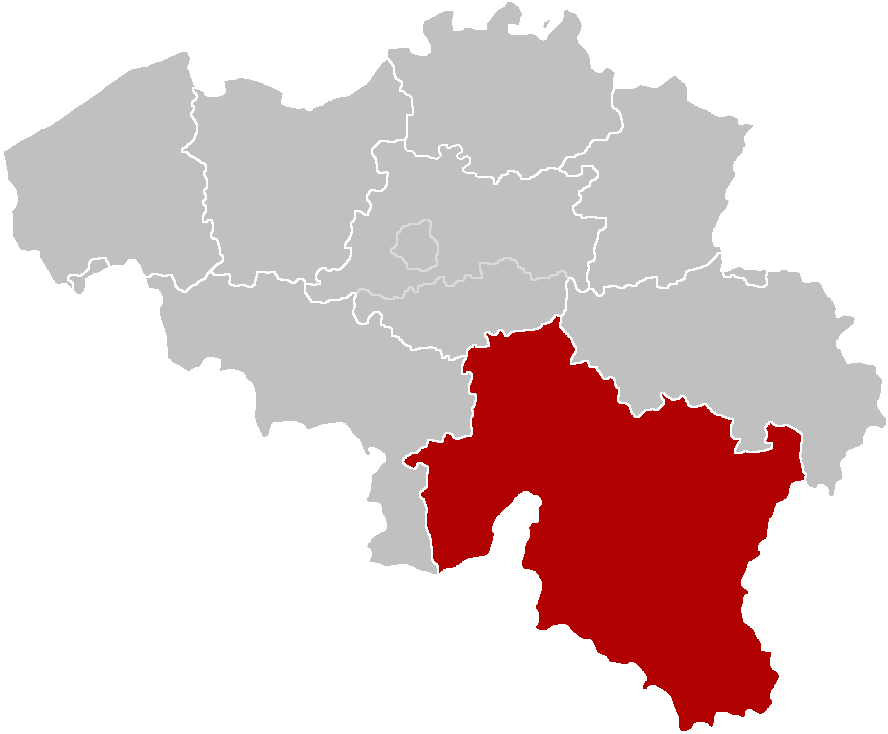
- The Diocese of Namur, coextensive with the two provinces of Namur and Luxembourg

Website
- Website of the Diocese

The Diocese of Namur (Latin: Dioecesis Namurcensis) is a Latin Church ecclesiastical territory or diocese of the Catholic Church in Belgium. It is a suffragan of the Archdiocese of Mechelen-Brussels. The diocese is a suffragan in the ecclesiastical province in the metropolitan Archdiocese of Mechelen-Brussels. Its cathedra is found within St. Aubin's Cathedral in the episcopal see of Namur.

== History ==
The diocese was constituted as a suffragan see of the new metropolitan see of Cambrai by the papal bull of 12 May 1559 establishing the new bishoprics in the Low Countries. Its territory had previously belonged to the Diocese of Liège. After suppression in the French period the diocese was re-established by the Concordat of 1801, its extent matching that of the Department of Sambre-et-Meuse, and as suffragan of the Archdiocese of Mechelen. On 14 September 1823, the territory of the diocese was extended to include Luxembourg, which had previously been part of the Diocese of Metz. After the Belgian Revolution of 1830, a vicar apostolic was appointed for those parts of Luxembourg under Dutch control. As a result of the Treaty of London (1839) formalising the partition of Luxembourg between the Grand Duchy of Luxembourg and the Belgian Province of Luxembourg, in 1840 ecclesiastical jurisdiction over the whole territory of the grand duchy was given to the vicar apostolic of Luxembourg, its loss to the Diocese of Namur being formalised on 7 October 1842.

In 1907, the Diocese of Namur numbered 583,722 inhabitants, 36 deaneries, 37 parishes, 677 succursals, 96 auxiliary chapels, 111 curacies paid by the State. Within the diocese, religious congregations administered 2 orphanages for boys, 7 for girls, 1 mixed, 18 hospitals or infirmaries, 4 clinics, 194 infant schools, 1 house of rescue, 6 houses for the care of the sick in their homes, 1 asylum for deaf mutes, 2 houses of retreat, 1 insane asylum.

== See ==
St Aubin's Cathedral in Namur was founded as a collegiate church in 1047 by Albert II of Namur. The first dean, Frederick of Lorraine, brother-in-law of Albert II, about 1050 secured from Mainz Cathedral a portion of the head of Saint Albinus, to whose patronage the collegiate church was dedicated. In 1057 Frederick became pope under the name of Stephen IX. In 1209, Pope Innocent III formally took the church under his protection. With the exception of one tower, the cathedral was entirely rebuilt in Baroque style in the 1750s.

The diocese also houses a minor basilica, the Basilica of Saint Maternus in Walcourt.

== Bishops ==
=== Bishops of Namur ===
==== Bishops of the first diocese ====
- Antoine Havet, 1561–1578
- François Wallon-Capelle, 1580–1592
- Jean Dave, 1593–1595
- Jacques Blaseus, 1597–1601, later bishop of Saint-Omer
- François Buisseret, 1601–1615, later archbishop of Cambrai
- Jean Dauvin, 1615–1629
- Engelbert Des Bois, 1630–1651
- Jean de Wachtendonck, 1654–1668, later archbishop of Mechelen
- Ignace Schetz de Grobbendonk, 1669–1679, formerly bishop of Roermond, later bishop of Ghent
- Pierre Vandenperre, 1680–1695
- Ferdinand de Berlo de Brus, 1698–1725
- Thomas Strickland de Sizergh, 1727–1740
- Paul-Godefroi de Berlo de Franc-Douaire, 1741–1771
- Ferdinand-Marie de Lobkowitz, 1772–1779, later bishop of Ghent
- Albert Louis de Lichtervelde, 1780–1796

==== Bishops since 1802 ====
- Claude de Bexon (25 May 1802 – 15 Sep 1803)
- Joseph Pisani de La Gaude (1803–1826)
- Nicolas-Alexis Ondenard (1828–1830)
- Jean Arnould Barret (15 Apr 1833 – 31 Jul 1835)
- Nicolas-Joseph Dehesselle (1 Feb 1836 – 1865)
- Victor-Auguste-Isidor Deschamps (25 Sep 1865 – 20 Dec 1867), appointed Archbishop of Mechelen (Cardinal in 1875)
- Théodore-Joseph Gravez (20 Dec 1867 – 1883 Died)
- Pierre-Lambert Goosens (16 Jul 1883 – 24 Mar 1884), appointed Archbishop of Mechelen (Cardinal in 1889)
- Édouard-Joseph Belin (27 Mar 1884 – 1892)
- Jean-Baptiste Decrolière ( 1892 – 1899)
- Thomas Louis Heylen (23 Oct 1899 – 28 Oct 1941)
- André Marie Charue (12 Dec 1941 – 24 Jun 1974)
- Robert-Joseph Mathen (24 Jun 1974 – 7 Feb 1991)
- Andre-Mutien Leonard (7 Feb 1991 – 18 Jan 2010), appointed Archbishop of Mechelen-Brussel
- Rémy Victor Vancottem (31 May 2010 – 5 Jun 2019)
- Pierre Warin (5 Jun 2019 - 6 Oct 2025)
- Fabien Lejeusne (Since 6 Oct 2025)

=== Coadjutor Bishops ===
- Paul Justin Cawet (1929-1941), died without succeeding to see
- Pierre-Lambert Goossens (1883); future Cardinal
- Robert-Joseph Mathen (1974)

=== Auxiliary Bishop ===
- Jean-Baptiste Musty (1957-1991)
- Pierre Warin (2004-2019), appointed bishop of this diocese

=== Other priests of this diocese who became bishops ===
- Nikolaus Adames (priest here, 1839-1840), appointed Vicar Apostolic of Luxembourg in 1863
- Guillaume-Philippe de Herzelles, appointed Bishop of Antwerp in 1743
- Julien Ries, appointed titular archbishop and then Cardinal in 2012
