= Nicolas Mainfroy =

Nicolas Mainfroy (c.1570–1611) was the 71st abbot of the Benedictine Abbey of Saint Bertin in Saint-Omer from 1604 until his death, and represented the First Estate in the States of the County of Artois, which is now in France but was then part of the Spanish Netherlands.

== Life ==
Mainfroy was born in Arras and entered the Abbey of St Bertin at the age of sixteen. He went on to study in the Benedictine houses of study at the universities of Douai and Louvain.

His canonical election as abbot was confirmed by letters patent of the sovereign, the Archduke Albert, dated 10 March 1604. At the age of 35 he was consecrated and enthroned as abbot by Jacques Blaseus, bishop of Saint-Omer, in March 1605. As abbot he settled the disputes between the monastery and the chapter of Saint-Omer Cathedral, and by skilful management of the abbey's assets, depleted during the hostilities of the Dutch Revolt, increased its annual revenue.

== Literary patronage ==
Works dedicated to Mainfroy include:

- Maximilien de Wignacourt, Antistitis praecellentis euphemia (Arras, Robert Maudhuy, 1605)
- Aubertus Miraeus, Origines coenobiorum Benedictorum in Belgio (Antwerp, Hieronymus Verdussen, 1606). Available on Google Books.
- Guillaume Gazet, Histoire de la vie, mort, passion et miracles des saints (Paris, Abraham Saugrain, 1606)
