= Jean Six =

Belgian theologian and Roman Catholic bishop

- Bishop of Saint-Omer
- Diocese: Ancient Diocese of Saint-Omer
- See: Notre Dame de Saint-Omer
- Appointed: 6 May 1580
- In office: 1581–1586
- Predecessor: Gérard de Haméricourt
- Successor: Jacobus Pamelius

Orders
- Consecration: 23 July 1581 by Mathieu Moullart, bishop of Arras

Personal details
- Born: 1533 Lille, Walloon Flanders, Habsburg Netherlands
- Died: 11 October 1586 (aged 52–53) Lille, Walloon Flanders, Spanish Netherlands
- Motto: Judicium cogita (Consider the right)

Jean Six (1533–1586) was a theologian and bishop of Saint-Omer.

== Life ==
Six was born in Lille, Walloon Flanders, in 1533, the son of a city magistrate. He studied at Leuven University, graduating Master of Arts in 1551. From 1552 to 1558 he taught Philosophy at Lily College, while studying Theology at Holy Spirit College, graduating Licentiate in Sacred Theology. On 21 June 1561 he succeeded Jean Hessels as head of the theological college.

On 31 January 1563 he resigned in favour of Cornelius Jansen to become parish priest of the Church of Saint-Étienne, Lille. On 3 December 1571 Gérard de Haméricourt, bishop of Saint-Omer, appointed him to a canonry of Saint-Omer Cathedral. Six signed the Union of Brussels on 9 January 1577 on behalf of the bishop. After Haméricourt's death, on 17 March 1577, Six represented the clergy in the States of the County of Artois, and was deputized to represent the States of Artois in the Estates General, where he took the rotating presidency whenever it was the county's turn. His intransigence towards the Calvinists led to his recall by the States.

On 7 October 1577 he was appointed canon penitentiary, and on 20 December 1577 diocesan administrator. When the rebels briefly took power in Saint-Omer, he refused to take an oath of loyalty to William of Orange, and on 22 April 1578 was banished from the city. During his exile he studied Hebrew at the University of Paris. He returned to Saint-Omer in February 1579, after the Union of Arras had been agreed. On 17 August 1579 he was reinstated as diocesan administrator, and was appointed archdeacon of Artois.

On 6 May 1580, the governor general of the Habsburg Netherlands, Alexander Farnese, sent Six the royal letters naming him bishop of Saint-Omer. Pope Gregory XIII confirmed the nomination on 3 March 1581. He was consecrated bishop in Douai on 23 July 1581 by Mathieu Moulart, bishop of Arras, assisted by Jean Sarazin, abbot of St Vaast, and Arnold Gantois, abbot of Marchiennes Abbey. He was installed in his see on 6 August. In December 1582 he formally adopted the Gregorian Calendar in his diocese.

After the conclusion of the Siege of Ypres (1584), Six was invited to that city to reconsecrate the churches. In January 1585 he assisted at the double consecrations in Tournai of Petrus Simons as bishop of Ypres and Clemens Crabbeels as bishop of 's-Hertogenbosch.

He died in Lille on 11 October 1586, while en route to attend a provincial synod in Mons. His secretary, Franciscus Lucas Brugensis, transported his heart back to Saint-Omer for burial there.

== Publications ==
- Statuta synodi dioecesanae audomarensis, anno M D LXXXIII (Douai, Jan Bogard, 1583), the statutes of the diocesan synod of 1583, introducing Tridentine reforms.

Catholic Church titles
Preceded by Gérard de Haméricourt	Bishop of Saint-Omer; 1581–1586	Succeeded by Jacobus Pamelius
