= Gérard de Haméricourt =

Bishop of Saint-Omer from 1561 to 1577

- Bishop of Saint-Omer
- Diocese: Ancient Diocese of Saint-Omer
- See: Notre Dame de Saint-Omer
- Appointed: 1561
- Predecessor: new foundation
- Successor: Jean Six
- Other post: abbot of St Bertin

Orders
- Ordination: 25 September 1530 by Richard von Greiffenklau zu Vollrads
- Consecration: 12 September 1563 by Cardinal Granvelle

Personal details
- Born: 1504 Binche, County of Hainaut, Habsburg Netherlands
- Died: 17 March 1577 (aged 72–73) Saint-Omer, Walloon Flanders, Habsburg Netherlands
- Parents: Henri de Haméricourt and Elisabeth de Spanghen
- Education: Collège de Boncourt, Paris
- Motto: Festina lente

Gérard de Haméricourt (1504–1577) was the first bishop of Saint-Omer.

== Life ==
Haméricourt was born in Binche the son of Henri de Haméricourt and Elisabeth de Spanghen. His father was a courtier of Mary of Hungary and provost and bailiff of Binche. Gérard was clothed as a Benedictine monk on 27 May 1519 by his great-uncle Antoine de Berghes, abbot of St Bertin in Saint-Omer. He studied at the Collège de Boncourt in Paris and was ordained to the priesthood on 25 September 1530 by Richard von Greiffenklau zu Vollrads, archbishop of Trier. In 1545 he was elected Abbot of St Bertin's. As abbot he founded a school for poor students attached to the monastery, and another in Poperinge.

With the foundation of the diocese of Saint-Omer, Haméricourt was nominated as its first bishop on 11 March 1561. His appointment was confirmed on 31 March 1563, and he was consecrated by Cardinal Granvelle in Brussels on 12 September 1563. He took possession of his see on 10 October the same year. On 20 October he carried out a canonical visitation of the cathedral chapter.

In 1565, together with Martin Rythovius, bishop of Ypres, and Antoine Havet, bishop of Namur, he sat on a committee to advise the government on the suppression of heresy. In the same year, he applied to Everard Mercurian to send Jesuits to Saint-Omer, establishing a Jesuit college in 1569. He died in Saint-Omer on 17 March 1577 and in accordance with his final wishes was buried in the Jesuit chapel, despite the opposition of the cathedral chapter. In 1667 his tomb was opened so that his remains could be transferred to the new Jesuit church, and they were found to be in an unusually good state of preservation.
