= Guillaume de la Rivière =

Guillaume de la Rivière (active 1569–1634), Latinized Gulielmus Rivierius was a printer active in Arras, in the County of Artois (then part of the Spanish Netherlands) from 1591 to 1634.

== Life ==
Born in Caen, Rivière was apprenticed to Christopher Plantin, who was married to his cousin Jeanne Rivière. Guillaume worked for Plantin from 1569 to 1591, becoming a citizen of Antwerp on 6 April 1576. In April 1591, he established his own business in Arras. His shop was at the sign of the Good Shepherd.

His son had a shop in Cambrai, 1610–1616, but returned to Arras and collaborated with him 1629–1634. Guillaume de la Rivière probably died in 1634.

== Publications ==
1592

- Robertus Obrizius, Hymnorum libri septem (1592)
- José Estève, Exhortation aux evesques, prestres et gens d'eglise (1592)

1593

- Maximilian de Wignacourt, Discours sur l'estat des Pays Bas (1593)
- Jacques Bourgeois, Les soulas et confors de l'ame chrestienne (1593)
- Charles, Duke of Mayenne, Declaration pour la reunion de tous les catholiques de ce royaume (1593)
- Lambertus Thomas Schenkels, Traicte de la memoire (1593)

1594

- La resolution d'onze docteurs de la Sorbonne de Paris assamblez en la ville d'Amiens (1594)
- Louis Richeome, L'adieu de l'ame devote laissant le corps (1594)

1595

- Discours de plusieurs sanglantes et signalees victoires obtenues par sa majesté imperiale contre les Turcs en Hongrie (1595)
- Discours de la bataille, siege et prise des ville et chasteau de Dourlens (1595)
- Nouvelle et veritable liste et denombrement des seigneurs et gentil-hommes de marque morts, prisonniers et blessez, à la prise dez ville et chasteau de Dourlens (1595)
- Breviarium ad usum insignis ecclesiae Atrebatensis (1595)
- Johann Tauler, Les institutions divines et salutaires enseignemens (1595)

1596

- Richard White of Basingstoke, Ad leges decem-virorum in duodecim tabulis; institutiones juris civilis in quatuor libris; primam partem digestorum in quatuor libris; notae juris interpretati (1596)
- Hendrik Herp, Le guidon des spirituelz et contemplatifz contenant douze mortifications (1596)
- Frans Vervoort, Mandelet de l'espoux, de l'imitation interieure de la vie et croix de nostre seigneur Jesus Christ (1596)
- Discours touchant la prise admirable de la ville de Calais (1596)
- Richard White, Orationes: 1. de circulo artium et philosophiae, 2. de eloquentia et Cicerone, 3. pro divitiis regum, 4. pro doctoratu, 5 de studiorum finibus: cum notis rerum variarum et antiquitatis (1596)
- Baldassare Pisanelli, Traicté de la nature des viandes et du boire (1596)
- Philip II of Spain, Placart touchant la permission et tolerance du traffique et entrecours de marchandise par mer entre les villes de Gravelingue, l'Escluse et autres ports de Flandre avec la ville de Calais (1596)

1597

- Philippe Bosquier, Le fouët de l'academie des pecheurs (1597)
- Jan Wouters van Vieringen, De jejunio et abstinentia medico-ecclesiastici libri quinque (1597)
- Discours touchant la prise admirable de la grande et puissante ville d'Amiens (1597)
- Richard White, Historiarum libri cum notis antiquitatum Britannicarum (1597)
- Lorenzo Allario, Epistre de la mort heureuse et chrestienne l'illustrissime seigneur le sieur Camille de Gonzagua (1597)
- Vita sanctorum fratrum martyrum Luglii archiepiscopi et Lugliani regis Hybernie (1597)

1598

- Richard White, Historiarum Britanniae liber sextus. Quo vis armorum in campis, & authoritatis litterarum in scholis, atque religio christiana in orbe terrarum publicata, demonstratur (with Charles Boscard of Douai, 1598)
- Jacques de Villamont, Les voyages (1598)
- Copie de la lettre d'un gentilhomme d'Arthois escrite de Parague (1598)
- Chanson nouvelle pour rendre action de graces au bon Dieu touchant la paix faicte a Vervins (with Gilles Baudouin, 1598)
- Copie des lettres envoyees de son alteze en Arras pour la publication de la paix le 7 juin 1598 (with Gilles Baudouin, 1598)

1599

- Brief discours du voyage et entrees faictes par la Royne d'Espagne en Italie: avec les triomphes & pompes exhibees, tant en la ville de Ostia, Ferrare, Mantoüe, Cremone, Milan, que es autres bourgades & villettes d'Italie (Arras, Guillaume de La Rivière, 1599)
- Guillaume Gazet, Briefve histoire de la sacree manne et de la saincte chandelle (1599)
- Jacques Bourgeois, L'harmonie de la harpe du roy David (1599)
- Philippe Bosquier, La servitude des pecheurs (1599)
- Pierre de Bérulle, Discours de l'abnegation interieure (1599)
- Diego de Yepes, La relation faicte de la derniere maladie et mort de sadicte majesté decedée si pieusement et chrestiennement en son monastere royal de l'Escurial (1599)

1600

- Manuale sacerdotum ad usum insignis ecclesiae et dioecesis Atrebatensis (1600)
- Jacques Bourgeois, Exemples des plus illustres miracles (for Gilles Baudouin, 1600)
- Ferry de Locre, Oraison funebre sur le trespas de monseigneur le reverendissime evesque d'Arras, messire Matthieu Moullart ([1600])
- Philip II of Spain, Edict et ordonnance sur le fait de la levee et collectation du centiesme denier des biens meubles et immeubles (1600)
- Guillaume de Reboul, Les salmonees (1600)
- Raymond of Sabunde, La violette de l'ame (1600)
- Philippe Carpentier, Chant gratulatoire à la joyeuse entrée des altesses Albert et Isabelle en leur ville d'Arras (1600)

1601

- Louis Richeome, La Saincte messe déclarée et défendue contre les erreurs sacramentaires de nostre temps, ramassez au Livre de l'institution de l'eucharistie de Du Plessis (1601)

1602

- Ferry de Locre, La Prelature des vierges sacrees, aves les canons et SS. Peres de l’Eglise, ou sont rapportez les rares faits & exemples de plusieurs Sainctes Abbesses, & signamment de celles qui ont regenté en Belgique (1602)
- Luis de Granada, Les Additions ou supplément du Memorial de la vie chrestienne (1602)
- Robert Viseur, Response catholique aux déclarations de deux moynes Apostats, qui depuis n'agueres ont abjuré la vraye Religion en l’assemblée des Hereticques (1602)
- Jacques de Villamont, Les Voyages (1602)
- Guillaume Gazet, Le Cabinet des dames; contenant l’ornement spirituel de la femme, fille, & vefue chrestienne (1602)

1603

- Ferry de Locre, Marie Auguste ou bien Discours des louanges, tiltres et grandeurs; des Royaumes, Isles, Villes, Ordres, Monasteres, Temples, Images, Reliques, Festes, Confreries, Indulgences et Offices de la Mere de Dieu (1603)
- James I of Great Britain, Edict du Roy d'Angleterre, Ecosse et Irlande, &c. Par lequel sa Majesté deffend de faire la guerre aux subiets du Roy d'Espagne (1603)

1604

- Petrus de Cruce, Discours de l’usage vertu, et miracles du signe de la Croix (1604)
- Simon Goulart, Histoires admirables et mémorables de nostre temps (for Balthazar Bellerus of Douai, 1604)
- Louis Richeome, Le Pelerin de Lorette, accomplissant son voeu faict a la glorieuse Vierge Marie Mere de Dieu (1604)

1605

- Hendrik Herp, L'Escole de Sapience ou Theologie mistique (1605)
- Louis Richeome, Defence des pelerinages contre le traducteur d'une lettre pretendue de S. Gregoire de Nisse sur les Pelerinages de Hierusalem (1605)
- Mathias Bellintani de Salo, Pratique de l’oraison mentale ou contemplative (1605)
- Franciscus Moschus, Le Jardin de plaisance de la bien-heureuse vierge Marie, divisé en trois parties (1605)
- Jacques de Villamont, Les Voyages divisez en trois livres (1605)
- Ferry de Locre, Discours de la noblesse auquel par une conférence des familles de Castille, France et Austrice, avec l'Eglise catholique, est descouverte l'infamie de l'heretique (1605)
- Pierre Doré, La Tourterelle de viduité enseignant les vefves comment elles doivent vivre en leur estat, & consolant en leurs adversitez, aussi les Orphelins (1605)

1606

- Petite instruction distinguée par demandes et responces propres à instruire les enfans qui ont l’usage de raison, & simples gens (1606)
- Raimon Jordan, Idiota de Vita et moribus religiosorum. Opusculum (1606)
- François de Monceaux, Aaron purgatus sive de vitulo aureo, libri duo (1606)
- Ferry de Locre, Chronica anacephaleosis Mariae augustae virginis deiparae (1606)

1607

- Pedro de Ribadeneyra, Vie du B. Pere Ignace de Loyola, fondateur de la Compagnie de Jesus (1607)
- Diego de Pantoja, Advis envoyé de Paquin Cité de la Chine, au R.P. Loys de Gusman, de la mesme Compagnie (1607)
- Mathias Bellintani de Salo, Practique de l'oraison mentale ou contemplative (1607)
- Nicolas Gazet, Chronique ou institution premiere de la religion des Annonciades fondees a l'honneur de la V. Marie par la Princesse Jeanne de France (1607)

1608

- Copie d'un tres-fameux miracle arrivé en la Cité de Palerme l'an 1607 (1608)
- Luis de Cerqueira, Histoire veritable de la glorieuse mort, que six nobles chrestiens, Japonois, ont constamment enduré pour la foy de Jesus-Christ (1608)
- Louis Richeome, L'Idolatrie huguenote figurée au patron de la vieille payenne (1608)

1609

- Benet Canfield, Reigle de perfection contenant un bref & lucide Abregé de toute la vie spirituelle reduitte à ce seul point de la volonté de Dieu (1609)
- Guillaume Gazet, L'histoire de la Saincte Chandelle miraculeusement donnee de Dieu et religieusement conservée en la ville d'Arras depuis l'an 1105 (1609)

1610

- Teresa of Avila, La Vie, moeurs, esprit, zele, et doctrine de la servante de Dieu Therese de Jesus, de l’ordre de Nostre Dame du Mont-Carmel (1610)
- Guillaume Gazet, Tableaux sacrez de la Gaule Belgique: pourtraits au modele du pontifical Romain, selon l'ordre & suire des papes, & de tous les evesques des Pays-bas (1610)

1611

- Louis Richeome, Le Pelerin de Lorette, accomplissant son voev faict a la glorieuse Vierge Marie Mere de Dieu (1611)
- Guillaume de Rebreviettes, Le Philaret (1611)
- Pierre du Jarric, L'Histoire des choses plus memorables advenues tant és Indes Orientales, qu'autres pays de la descouverte des Portugais en l'establissement et progrez de la foy Chrestienne & Catholique (1611)

1612

- Guillaume Gazet, Briefve histoire de la sacree manne, et de la saincte chandelle miraculeusement données de Dieu (1612)

1613

- Pedro de Ribadeneyra, Les Fleurs des vies des saincts et des festes de toute l’annee, svyvant l’usage du Calendrier Romain reformé (1613)
- Les Adventures de l’an treize (1613)

1614

- Guillaume Gazet, L'histoire ecclesiastique du Pays-Bas. Contenant l'ordre et suite de tous les evesques et archevesques de Chacun diocese, auec un riche recueil de leurs faicts plus illustres (1614)
- Pedro de Ribadeneyra, Nouveau manuel de prieres divisé en huict Parties (1614)

1615

- Pedro de Ribadeneyra, Les Vies des bien-heureux peres de la Compagnie de Jesus Ignace de Loyola, François Xavier, François Borgia, Louys de Gonsague, Stanislas Costka (1615)

1616

- François Arnoulx, Les Merveilles de l’autre monde. Contenant Les Horribles tourmens de l’Enfer (1616)
- François Arnoulx, Practique spirituelle enseignant le moyen de se garder d’offencer Dieu, pour eviter l’Enfer, & acquerir le Paradis (1616)
- Guillaume Gazet, L'Image de la religieuse reformée, tirée au modele des SS. Dames Fondatrices des Ordres Réformés (1616)
- Léon Hubertin, Du bien de l’estat de ceux et celles qui vouent et gardent la chasteté au monde (1616)

1617

- Luis de la Puente, Meditations sur les mysteres de la foy, divisées en sept parties qui correspondent aux trois Voyes, Purgative, Illuminative, & unitive (1617)
- Ferry de Locre, Marie Auguste ou cabinet des grandeurs de la mere de Dieu (1617)
- Pierre Coton, Sermons sur les principales et plus difficiles Matieres de la Foy (1617)

1619

- Étienne Binet, La Vie du bien-heureux Amedee duc III. de Savoye (1619)
- Luis de la Puente, Traicté des estats de continence et virginité. Des vertus qui les accompagnent, & des moyens de les bien conserver & perfectionner (1619)
- Étienne Binet, De la devotion a la glorieuse Vierge Marie mere de Dieu, vraye marque de nostre Prédestination, tirée de l’Escriture Saincte, et des SS. Peres (1619)

1621

- Thomas a Kempis, IV livres de l’imitation de Jésus Christ (1621)

1622

- Alard Gazet, De Officio, seu Horis B. Mariae Virginis collectanea disquisitio (with Jean de La Rivière, 1622)
- Discours des choses memorables qui se sont passees au trespas, & aux funerailles du feu cardinal Bellarmin, de tres-illustre & glorieuse memoire (1622)

1623

- Basile d'Ath, Histoire de la vie, mort et miracles de Ste Aldegonde Vierge, Fondatrice, Patrône, & premiere Abbesse des nobles Dames Chanoinesses de la ville de Maubeuge (1623)

1626

- Guillaume Gazet, Les Regles et constitutions des ordres reformez des Claristes, Brigittines, Annonciades, Carmelines, & Capucines (with Jean Baptiste de La Rivière, 1626)

1627

- Pedro Fernandez Gayoso, Parentescos que tiene Don Juan Antonio de Vera y Zuniga, senor de Las Villas de Torremayor Sierrabrava y san Lorenço, gentilhombre de la boca de sv magestad (1627)

1628

- Guillaume Moncarré, Sommaire de la bulle du jubilé universel Concédé par N.S. Pere le Pape Urbain VIII l’an M.DC.XXVIII (with Jean Baptiste de la Rivière, 1628)
- John Cassian, Opera omnia (with Jean Baptiste de la Rivière, 1628)
- Pierre du Jarric, Nouvelle histoire des choses plus mémorables advenuës tant ès Indes Orientales, qu’autres pays de la descouverte des Portugais en l’establissement et progrez de la foy Chrestienne et Catholique (1628)

1629

- Claude Dausque, Conciliabuli Dordraceni Ascia a Claudio Dausquio Canonico Torna-Rigiaci Atrbatium (with Jean Baptiste de la Rivière, 1629)
- Jacques Simon, Le Pourtraict de l’estat de mariage et de continence fait sur la vie de la tres-illustre S. Wautrude comtesse de Hainau et patronne de Mons (with Jean Baptiste de la Rivière, 1629)

1631

- Antonius Deslions, Elegiae de cultu B.V. Mariae (with Jean Baptiste de la Rivière, 1631)
- Jacques Simon, Le Bon usage du tres-auguste sacrement de l’autel, et du tres-excellent sacrifice de la messe (with Jean Baptiste de la Rivière, 1631)
- Guillaume Gazet, Histoire de la S. Chandelle miraculeusement donnee de Dieu (with Jean Baptiste de la Rivière, 1631)

1632

- Officia propria festorum, quae in ecclesia Atrebatensi antiquitus solita sunt celebrari, iuxta usum Breviarii romani accommodata (with Jean Baptiste de la Rivière, 1632)

1633

- Les effroyables batailles, nouvellement apparues, tant au ciel que sur la terre, près et sur la ville de Gand en Flandre la nuit du 24 octobre 1633 (1633)
- Lorenzo Scupoli, Le Combat spirituel, composé par les RR. PP. Prestres Reguliers, appeliez communément Theatins (with Jean Baptiste de la Rivière, 1633)

1634

- Luis de la Puente, Meditations sur les mysteres de la foy, divisées en sept parties qui correspondent aux trois voyes, purgative, illuminative et unitive (with Jean Baptiste de La Rivière, 1634)
