= Joseph de Bergaigne =

Illustrious and Most Reverend Doctor Joseph de Bergaigne
- Archbishop of Cambrai
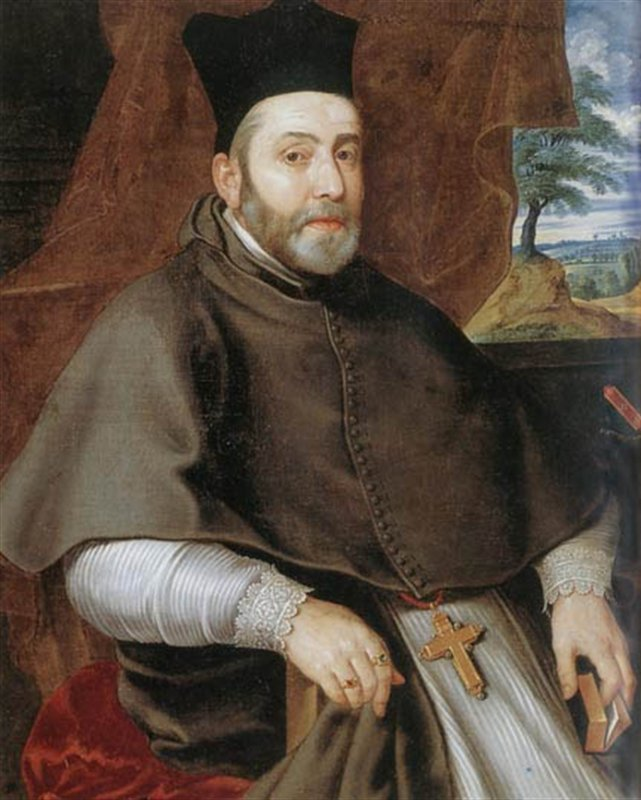
- Church: Catholic Church
- Diocese: Cambrai
- See: Notre Dame de Cambrai
- Elected: 24 February 1645
- Predecessor: Franciscus van der Burch
- Successor: Gaspard Nemius
- Other post: Bishop of 's-Hertogenbosch (appointed 1638)

Orders
- Consecration: 27 October 1641 by Jacobus Boonen

Personal details
- Born: 1 May 1588 Breda, Duchy of Brabant, Spanish Netherlands
- Died: 24 October 1647 (aged 59) Münster, Prince-Bishopric of Münster, Holy Roman Empire
- Buried: Franciscan church, Antwerp
- Education: Philosophy and Theology

Joseph de Bergaigne (1588–1647) was a prelate and diplomat from the Habsburg Netherlands who was appointed bishop of 's-Hertogenbosch and archbishop of Cambrai. He was the last bishop of 's-Hertogenbosch until the restoration of the Catholic hierarchy in the Netherlands in 1853.

== Life ==
Bergaigne was born in Breda, in the Duchy of Brabant, on 1 May 1588, to a family of Italian descent that later moved to Antwerp. He entered the Order of Friars Minor at an early age and was sent to study in Spain, where he obtained doctorates in both philosophy and theology, which he went on to teach in Cologne and Mainz.

He became provincial of the Rhine province in 1616, and in 1618 definitor and commissioner general for Germany and the Low Countries. Emperor Ferdinand II entrusted him with a number of sensitive missions, including negotiations concerning the election of the future Emperor Ferdinand III as King of the Romans in 1636.

In January 1638 he was appointed bishop of 's-Hertogenbosch. As the city had fallen to the Dutch in 1629, he was not able to enter his see. On 27 October 1641, he was consecrated bishop by Jacobus Boonen, and he exercised his authority as bishop as best he could from Geldrop. On 24 February 1645 he was elected archbishop of Cambrai, taking possession of the see by procuration on 27 July 1646. As Philip IV of Spain had appointed him his representative at the Congress of Münster, he was unable to visit the see in person. He died in Münster on 24 October 1647, before the conclusion of peace, but after having signed a commercial treaty with the Hanseatic League. He was buried in the Augustinian church there. Over a decade later, his family had his remains transferred to the Franciscan convent in Antwerp where they were reburied on 18 September 1663 in a service led by Ambrosius Capello.

Catholic Church titles
Preceded by Michael Ophovius	Bishop of 's-Hertogenbosch; 1638–1647	Succeeded by vacant
Preceded by Franciscus van der Burch	Archbishop of Cambrai; 1645–1647	Succeeded by Gaspard Nemius
