= Jacobus Pamelius =

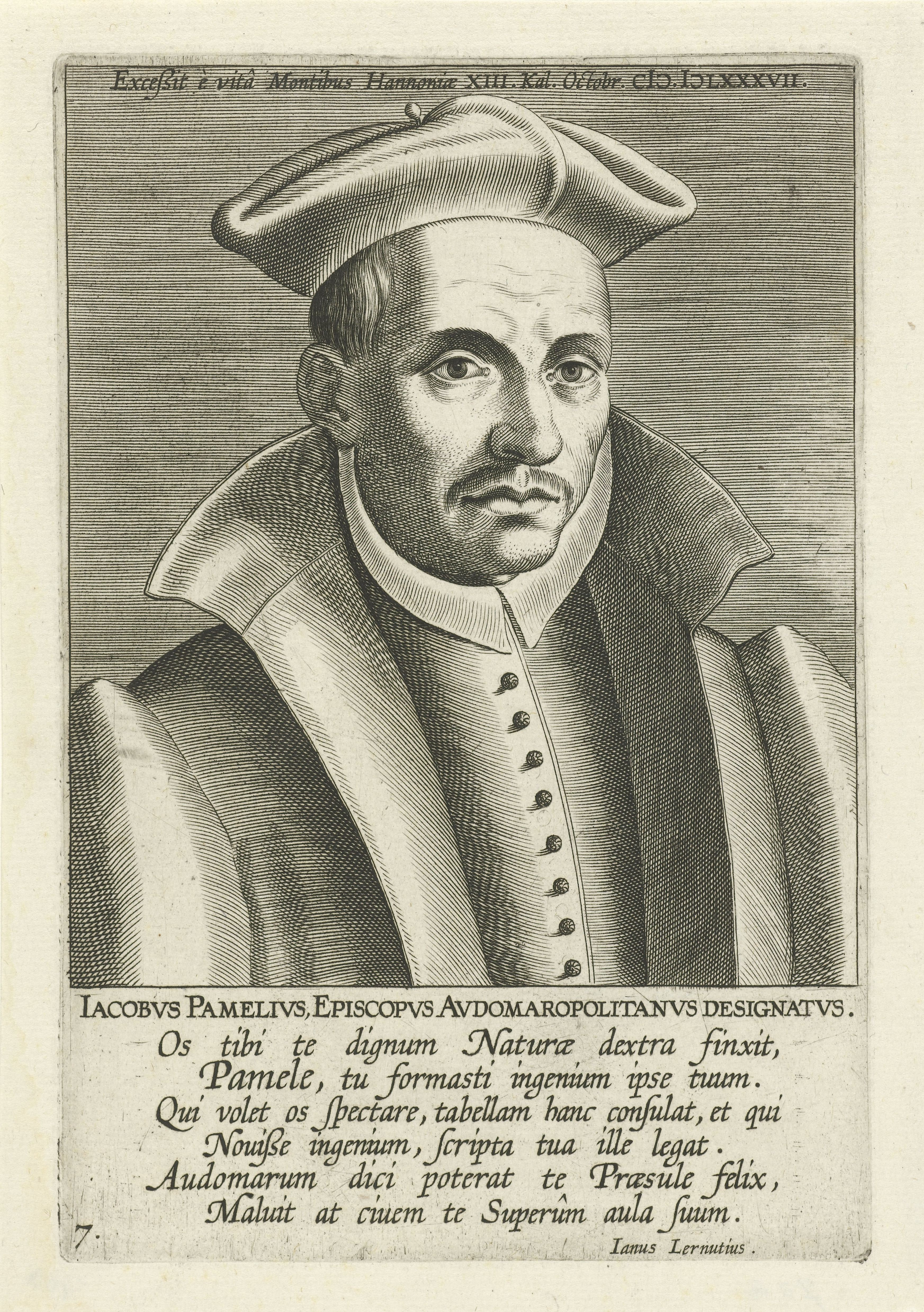
Jacobus Pamelius

Jacobus Pamelius (Jacob van Pamele) (13 May 1536 – 19 September 1587) was a Flemish theologian who was named bishop of Saint-Omer.

== Life ==
Pamelius was born at Bruges, in the County of Flanders, the son of Adolphe de Joigny de Pamele, lord of Castre and Gotthem, by Madeleine Vanden Heede. His father served in turn as alderman of Bruges, master of requests to the Privy Council, councillor of state, and imperial privy councillor. His elder brother, Willem van Pamele, would become president of the Council of Flanders and president of the Privy Council.

Jacobus was educated at the Cistercian Abbey of Boneffe in the County of Namur. He studied philosophy at Louvain University, and graduated magister artium on 27 March 1553. For the next nine years he was a student of theology in Pope's College, Leuven, following the lectures of Ruard Tapper and Josse Ravestein. After graduating Bachelor of Sacred Theology he continued his studies at the Sorbonne. On 19 June 1561, he was made a canon of St. Donatian's Cathedral, Bruges, but was still only a subdeacon. He was probably ordained a priest on 21 February 1562, the first priest ordained by Cardinal Granvelle as Archbishop of Mechelen. He graduated Licentiate of Sacred Theology the same year and settled in Bruges, living with his widowed mother and dedicating much of his time and resources to collecting old manuscripts.

The printer Johannes Hervagius (Johann Herwagen the Younger, died 1564), in a Preface Ad Lectorem, credits Pamelius (alone) with a large editorial contribution to the monumental 8-volume 1563 Basel Editio Princeps of the Complete Works of the Venerable Bede, begun under the supervision of Johann Herwagen the elder (died 1557). "For as in the bringing together of the books of Bede, so also in the emendation and restoration of many readings, Jacobus Pamelius laid out no small effort, an erudite man, one very respected in these matters, and diligent, and one to whom the readers owe a great deal."

Pamelius devoted himself to the publication of rare texts, continuing with the Micrologus de ecclesiasticis observationibus (Antwerp, Christophe Plantin, 1565), a liturgical commentary of the Roman Ordo which dates probably from the beginning of the twelfth century, and an edition of Cassiodorus's Institutiones divinarum lectionum published jointly with a catalogue of ancient biblical commentaries (Antwerp, Plantin, 1566), which he dedicated to Richard Creagh, Archbishop of Armagh. He was particularly interested in the writings of Cyprian and in liturgical books.

From 1568 to 1571 he held the deanery of Bruges, which he had accepted only on condition that he should be allowed to resign at the earliest opportunity. In 1570 he was appointed a member of the commission for the examination of books by Remi Drieux, Bishop of Bruges, and he aided in the publication of the Index expurgatorius of 1571. On 4 May 1574, he replaced George de Vrieze as scholaster of the chapter of St Donatian, and he was an active fundraiser for the establishment of a Jesuit college at Bruges in 1575.

The Dutch Revolt was by then in progress, and in response to the 1576 Pacification of Ghent, Pamelius penned a memo for the Flemish bishops (in particular Martin Rythovius, bishop of Ypres, and Remi Drieux, bishop of Bruges) providing arguments against religious toleration. After his death this was printed under the title De religionibus diversis non admittendis (Antwerp, Plantin, 1589). On 20 March 1578, rebel forces took control of Bruges. His efforts to save three Franciscan friars accused of sodomy from the death penalty attracted hostility, and he was obliged to withdraw to Douai. He probably left Bruges on 8 October 1578, the day that the Dominicans, Augustinian Hermits, and Carmelites were expelled.

The chapter of Saint-Omer granted him a prebend in 1580, and in 1581 appointed him Archdeacon of Flanders. It was during this period that he put the finishing touches to his long-gestated edition of Tertullian, which was published in Paris in 1584. He continued to develop a reputation for generosity to Catholic refugees in Walloon Flanders, both from parts of the Low Countries under Calvinist control, and from England and Ireland. When Louis de Berlaymont, Archbishop of Cambrai, summoned a provincial council to meet in Mons on 2 October 1586, Pamelius was to accompany Jean Six, bishop of Saint-Omer, as a theological adviser. Bishop Six fell ill at Lille and was unable to continue the journey. The bishop's secretary, Franciscus Lucas Brugensis, remained at his sick-bed and Pamelius went on alone, as the bishop's delegate.

Jean Six died on 11 October 1586, and Philip II named Pamelius as his successor as bishop. Pamelius died at Mons, in the County of Hainaut, before receiving his bulls of confirmation. He was buried in Saint Waltrude Collegiate Church in Mons. A service of commemoration was held in Saint-Omer on 20 January 1588, with Guillaume Taelboom delivering the eulogy.

== Works ==
Besides the Micrologus, he wrote

- Liturgica latinorum (Cologne, 1571)
- De religionibus diversis non admittendis (Antwerp, 1589)
- a catalogue of ancient commentaries on the Bible (Antwerp, 1566)

and he edited the works of St. Cyprian (Antwerp, 1566), Tertullian (Paris, 1584), and Hrabanus Maurus (Cologne, 1627).

Catholic Church titles
Preceded by Jean Six	Bishop of Saint-Omer; 1587	Succeeded by Jean de Vernois
