= Jean Bogard =

Jean Bogard (died around 1634) was a printer in Leuven and Douai in the 16th and 17th centuries.

== Life ==
Bogard was born in Leuven around the mid-16th century and from 1564 was working as a printer in the city. Not long after the foundation of Douai University Bogard began publishing in Douai, while continuing to maintain his printing house in Leuven until around 1600.

Bogard died in Douai around 1634, and his business was continued by his heirs.

== Publications ==
- Vincent of Lerins, Petit traicté ... pour la vérité et antiquité de la Foy Catholique (Leuven, 1564)
- Arnold Mermannus, De Fugienda Consuetudine Haereticorum Oratio Paraenetica Ad Catholicos (Leuven, 1564)
- Petrus Bacherius, Hortulus precationum (Leuven, 1566)
- François Richardot, Quatre sermons du sacrement de l'autel (Leuven, 1567)
- Petrus Bacherius, In Omnes Epistolas Quadragesimales Homiliae (Leuven, 1572)
- Hortulus animae (Douai, 1574)
- François Pollet, Historia Fori Romani (Douai, 1576)
- Jan Pascha, La pérégrination spirituelle vers la Terre saincte et cité de Jérusalem, translated by Nicolas de Leuze (Douai, 1576)
- Prosper of Aquitaine, Opera (Douai, 1577)
- Recueil des lettres, actes et pieces plus signalees du progres et besongne faict en la ville d'Arras & ailleurs, pour parvenir à une bonne paix & reconciliation avec sa majesté catholicque, par les estatz d'Arthois & deputez d'autres provinces (Douai, 1579)
- Traicte de reconciliation faict en la ville d'Arras le XVIIe. de may 1579 (Douai, 1579)
- Jean Michel, L'anatomie du corps politique comparé au corps humain, translated from Latin by Paul du Mont (Douai, 1581)
- Balthazar Ayala, De jure et officiis bellicis et disciplina militari (Douai, 1582)
- Statuta synodi dioecesanae audomarensis, anno M D LXXXIII (Douai, 1583), the statutes of the diocesan synod called by Jean Six to introduce Tridentine reform in the diocese of Saint-Omer
- Floris Van der Haer, De initiis tumultuum Belgicorum (Douai, 1587)
- Guillaume Gazet, Magdalis. Comoedia sacra (Douai, 1589)
- Luis de Granada, Le memorial de la vie chrestienne (Douai, 1592)
- Estienne Du Tronchet, Lettres missives et familières d'Estienne du Tronchet (Leuven, 1593)
- Giovanni Pietro Maffei, Les trois livres de la vie du Père Ignace de Loyole, translated by Michel d'Esne (Douai, 1594)
- Joannes Molanus, De Historia SS. Imaginum et Picturarum pro vero earum usu (Leuven, 1594) Available on Google Books
- Lettre du Japon des années 1591 et 1592, translated by Michel d'Esne (Douai, 1595)
- Fulvio Androzzi, Traictè de la frequente communion et des fruicts qui en procedent, translated by Antoine Gazet (Douai, 1599)
- Georges Maigret, Noviciat, ou compas journalier de la vie monastique, comprenant brefvement en forme de dialogues, ce à quoy toutes personnes Religieuses tant hommes que femmes se doibvent occuper tout le long de la journee (Douai, 1602)
- Joannes Busaeus, Manuel contenant des dévotes méditations sur tous les évangiles (Douai, 1612)
- Baldric of Noyon, Chronicon Cameracense et Atrebatense, edited by Georges Colvener (Douai, 1615)
- Jean-Baptiste Gramaye, Rerum Duacensium Libri Tres (Douai, 1618)
