= François Pollet =

- Born: Douai, Walloon Flanders, Habsburg Netherlands
- Died: Douai, Walloon Flanders, Habsburg Netherlands
- Education: Leuven University
- Occupation: lawyer
- Writing career
- Language: Latin
- Genre: legal history
- Subject: Roman institutions
- Notable work: Historia Fori Romani (1576)
- Movement: Renaissance humanism

François Pollet (died around 1547) was a lawyer from Douai, then in the County of Flanders (Habsburg Netherlands).

== Life ==
Pollet studied law at Leuven University and for a number of years became a lecturer in law at the University of Paris. He was then called to the bar, and returned to his native Douai, where he married and maintained a legal practice. He died young, leaving the incomplete manuscript of a study of Roman legal institutions. His work was later edited and put into print by his son-in-law, Philippe Broïde, a member of the city council of Douai.

== Publications ==
- Historia Fori Romani (Douai, Jan Bogard, 1576) Available on Google Books
