= Ferry de Locre =

Ferry de Locre (Latinized Ferreolus Locrius) (1571–1614) was a historical and devotional writer from the County of Artois (then part of the Spanish Netherlands).

== Life ==
Locre was born at Saint-Pol-sur-Ternoise, in the County of Artois, in 1571 and studied at Douai University under Joannes Miraeus. He became a member of the clergy and was appointed to the church of St Nicholas in Arras. He wrote a number of works, primarily historical, focusing mainly on the County of Artois. He died at Arras on 22 August 1614.

== Publications ==
- Oratio funebris in exequiis Rev. D. Matthæi Moullartii, Atrebatum Episcopi (Arras, Guillaume de la Rivière, 1600)
- Prélature des Vierges sacrées, avec les Canons et les SS. Pères de l Eglise, où sont rapportez les rares faicts et exemples de plusieurs sainctes Abbesses, et signamment de celles qui ont régenté la Belgique (Arras, Guillaume de La Rivière, 1602)
- Discours de la noblesse, auquel, par une conférence des familles de Castille, de France et de l'Autriche avec l'Eglise catholique, est descouverte l'infamie de l'Hérétique (Arras, Guillaume de La Rivière, 1605)
- Chronica anacephalaeosis Mariae Augustae Virginis (Arras, Guillaume de La Rivière, 1606) Available on Google Books
- Maria Augusta Deiparata in seplem libros distributa (Arras, R. Maudhuy, 1608) Available on Google Books
- Histoire chronographique des comté, pays et ville de Saint-Pol en Ternois (Douai, Laurence Kellam, 1613)
- Chronicon Belgicum, ab anno CCLVIII ad annum usque MDC continuo perductum (Arras, Guillaume de La Rivière, 1616) Available on Google Books
