= Jacob van Reesbroeck =

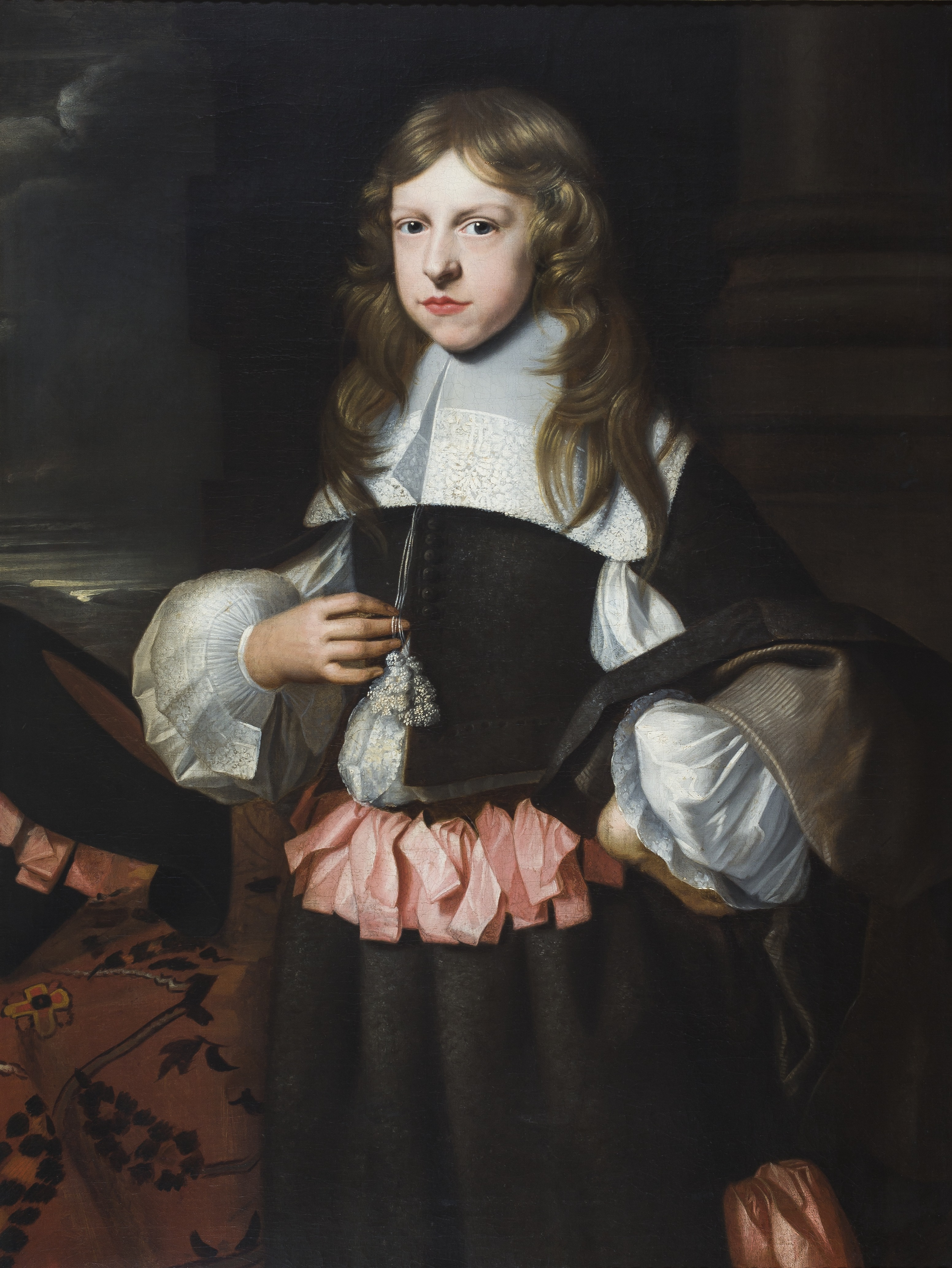
Portrait of Balthasar III Moretus

Jacob van Reesbroeck or Jacob van Rysbroeck (c. 6 December 1620 – 27 February 1704) was a Flemish portrait painter and engraver from Antwerp whose patrons included prominent local families as well as foreign aristocrats and monarchs.

== Life ==
Jacob van Reesbroeck was born in Antwerp on or shortly before 6 December 1620 (the date of his baptism). At the age of 14 he commenced his artistic training under Jacob Spaeingaert, an obscure portrait painter. He studied painting as well as engraving. Van Reesbroeck became a master of the Antwerp Guild of Saint Luke in 1641. In the same year he was inducted into the 'sodaliteit of bejaerde jongmans', a fraternity for bachelors established by the Jesuit order. In 1642 he became a free master of the 'Schilder-kamer' (the "Painter's Chamber') of the Guild of Saint Luke.

On 6 December 1648 van Reesbroeck married Joanna van Monnickreede in Antwerpen. A year later their only children - the twins Renier and Jacob - were born.

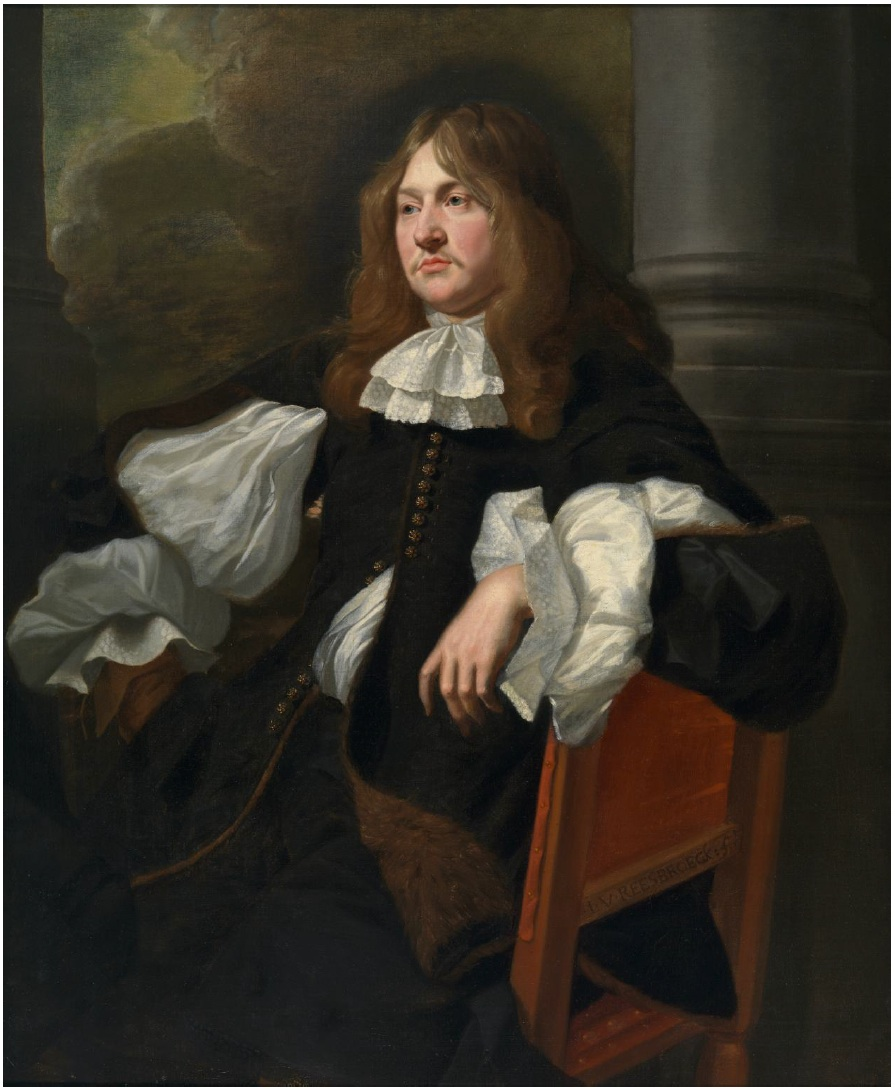
Portrait of Edward Hyde

In the period between 1649 and 1653 van Reesbroeck painted his first known work: the Portrait of Edward Hyde, (Royal Museums of Fine Arts of Belgium). Edward Hyde, 1st Earl of Clarendon was a British statesman who after the execution of Charles I of England left England and resided in Antwerp between 1649 and 1653 with his second wife and daughter. Van Reesbroeck received many commissions for portraits from ecclesiastical clients, including Ambrosius Capello and Benedicto Blommaerts. At the same time van Reesbroeck received commissions from local and foreign secular patrons. He was asked by Balthasar Moretus II to produce four portraits of members of the Moretus family, the owners of the Plantin Press in Antwerp. He also painted the portraits of prominent aristocrats such as those of Charles-Antoine de Calonne and Frederick William, Elector of Brandenburg.

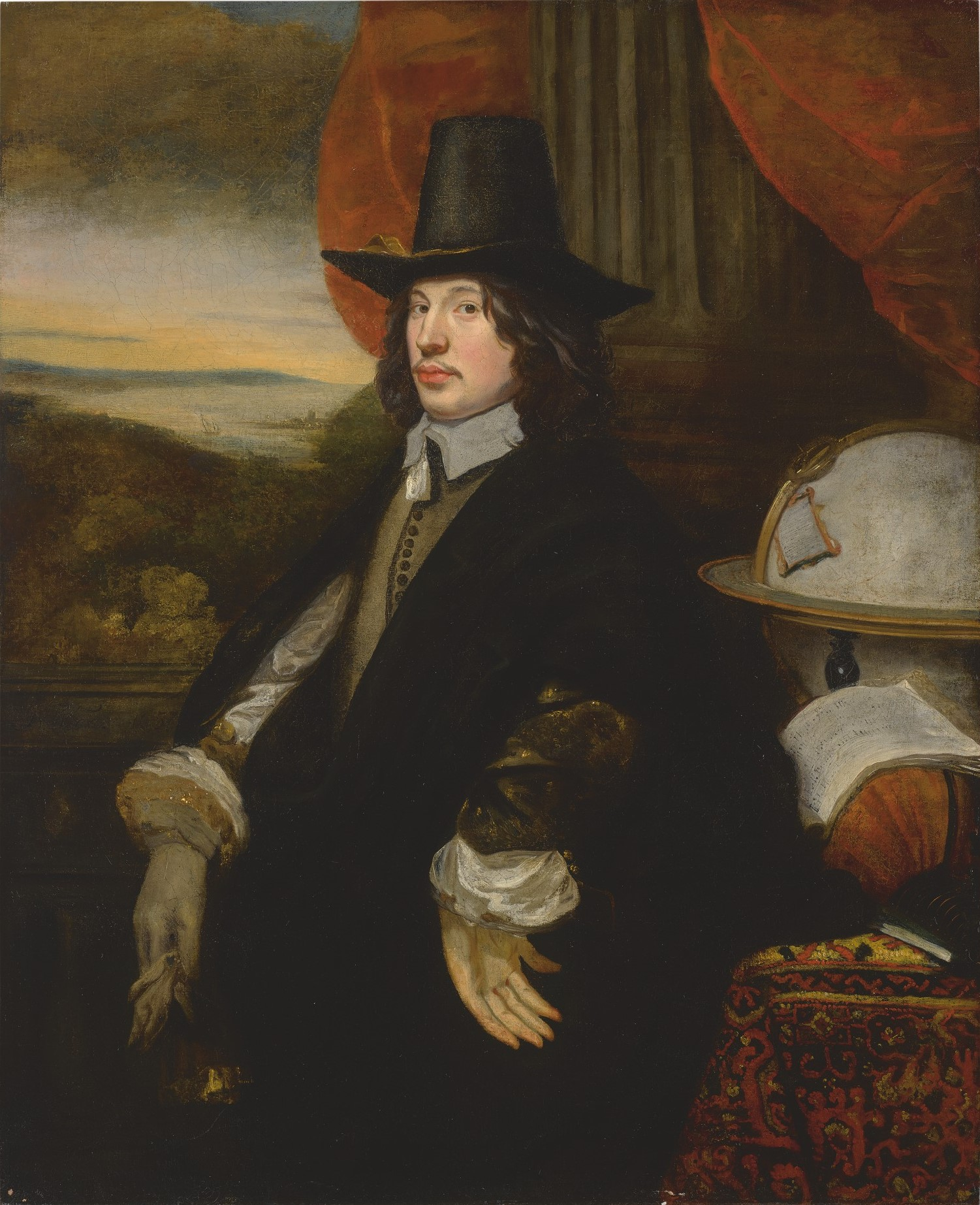
Portrait of a gentleman, possibly the sea captain Joost Verschueren

In the period 1659-1660 van Reesbroeck had three pupils: J. IV Bol, Jacob or Michiel Boels and Peeter Hamens. Van Reesbroeck was also active in local organizations such as the 'sodaliteit der getrouwden', a fraternity for married men established by the Jesuit order. Van Reesbroeck was elected the 'consultor' of the sodaliteit in 1666 and 1682. He was further appointed as 'wijkmeester' (district master) by the Antwerp magistrate, a sign of his social status in Antwerp.

In 1682 van Reesbroeck moved his residence to Hoogstraten, a small town in the immediate vicinity of Antwerp. In Hoogstraten he painted four paintings representing the four church fathers for the Saint John Evangelist Church of the local beguinage. These works form the only known works in the oeuvre of van Reesbroeck which are not portraits.

In 1702 van Reesbroeck made his will and two years later he died in Hoogstraten.

== Work ==
The work of van Reesbroeck consists mainly of portraits. He is also known for four history paintings depicting the church fathers. As van Reesbroeck only signed the portraits of his foreign patrons and the paintings of the church fathers, the attributions of certain works to the artist are not always firm. For instance, the Portrait of two men (Museum of Fine Arts, Ghent) has traditionally been attributed to Jacob van Oost but recently some scholars proposed an attribution to van Reesbroeck.

Van Reesbroeck worked for a while as the 'private painter' of the Moretus family. In 1695 Balthasar Moretus II commissioned the artist to paint portraits of himself, his wife and mother and also to make adjustments to an existing family portrait. As was common at the time, the pendant portraits of Balthasar Moretus II and his wife Anna Goos place the husband on the dominant position on the right. The pictures show the sitters with fairly stern expressions staring straight at the viewer. They are dressed in the latest fashions but without extragance. The overall impression given by the two portraits is that of wealth and virtue without exuberance. The red curtain, view to the open sky and an antique column in the background provide the necessary contrast in the picture of Anna Goos. These elements are a constant in van Reesbroeck's work and were already present in his earliest works.

Mr and Mrs Balthasar II Moretus

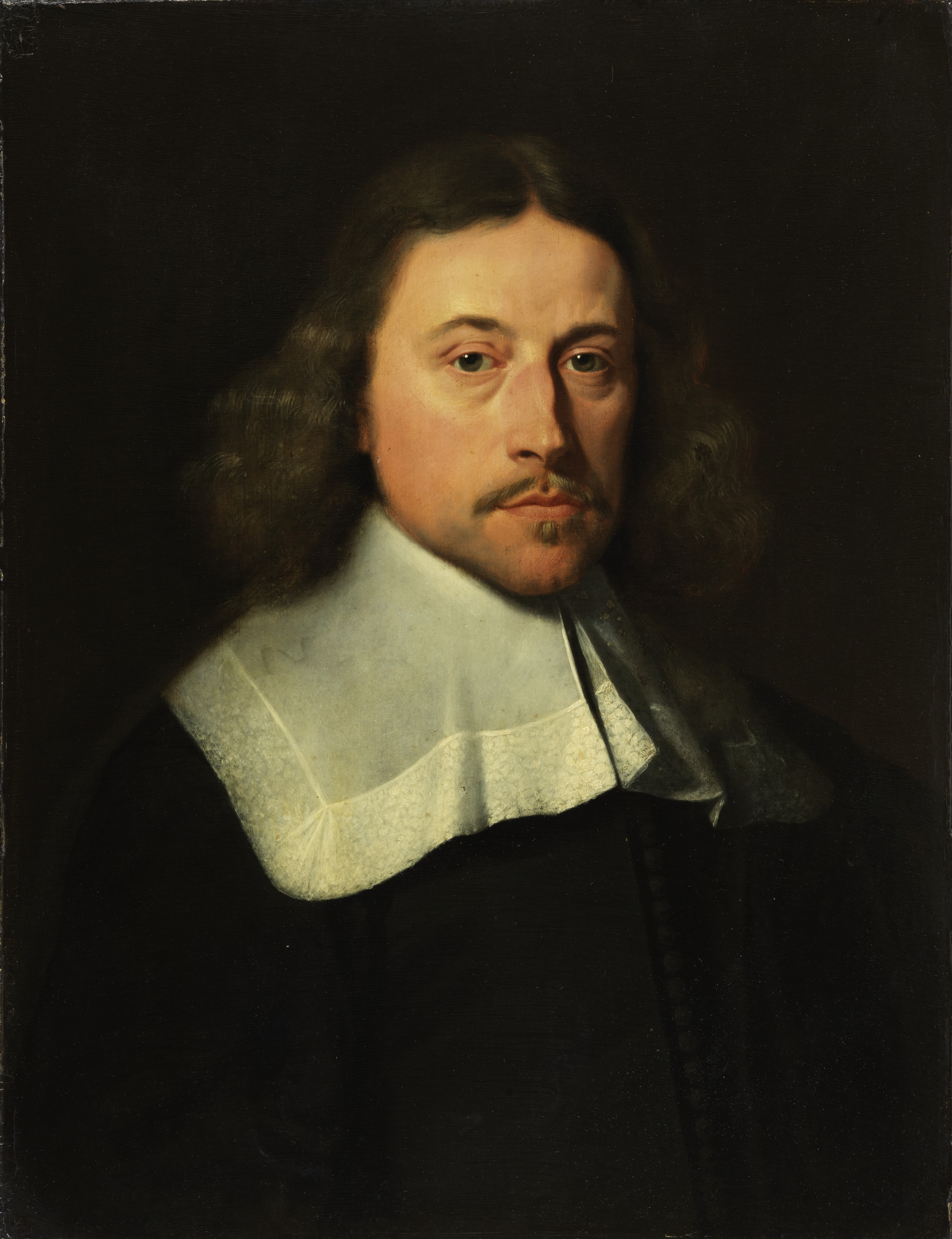

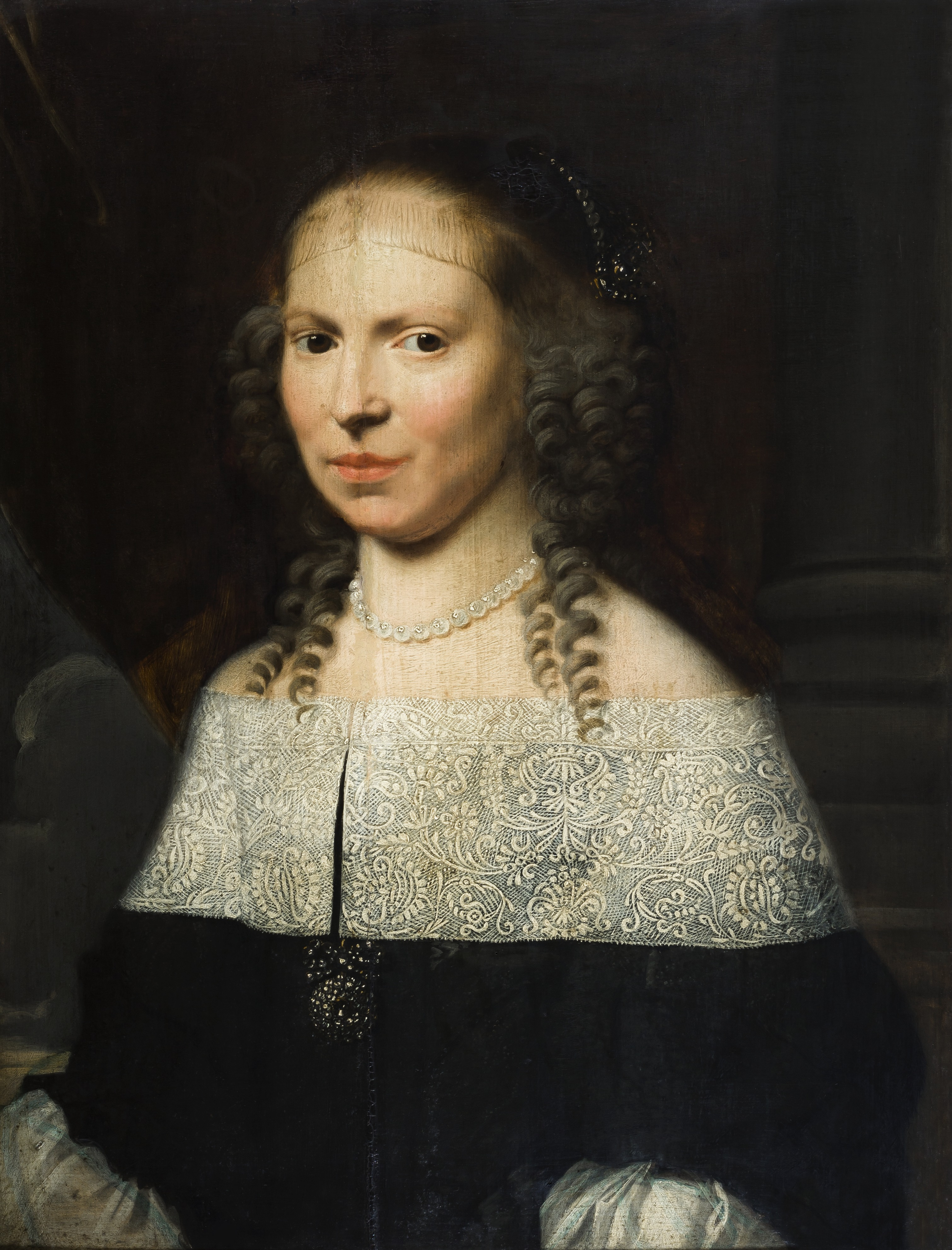

The portrait of Balthasar II Moretus' mother is more old-fashioned as it was to serve as a pendant to a portrait of her husband painted by another painter years before. Van Reesbroeck clearly had difficulty giving volume to the portrait as he did not paint from a live model. The person depicted was already deceased and he probably had to rely on a grisaille portrait or oral descriptions by family members.

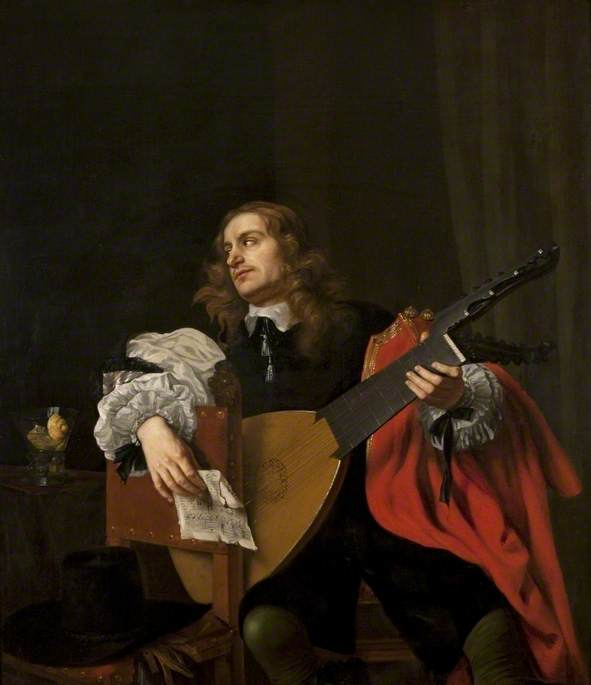
Portrait of a Man with a Lute

The portrait of fourteen-year-old Balthasar III Moretus at three-quarter length is more lively than the portraits of his parents painted a year earlier. The young man is pictured in a confident pose in a so-called akimbo posture. His costume is richly detailed and very fashionable. His whole posture with his shoulders held backwards and his mannered hands conveys an upbringing that attached paramount importance to physical elegance and required children to attend dancing classes to accomplish this goal. In the background of the painting there is again a view of the sky and an antique column.

A very elegant Portrait of a Man with a Lute, (Kelvingrove Art Gallery and Museum) formerly attributed to the Dutch painter Isaack Luttichuys is now given to Jacob van Reesbroeck. The lively pose and very free handling of certain portions, such as the puffy cuffs, bear a resemblance with the work of van Reesbroeck. The painting is difficult to classify as it could be an informal portrait of a musician, or perhaps a gentleman with musical tastes as well as a genre painting, possibly representing the sense of hearing.

The current location of a number of paintings of van Reesbroeck is unknown. Some of these works are only known by the prints after his work made by van Reesbroeck himself or other Antwerp engravers. For instance, the Portrait of Cardinal Benedict Blommaerts (British Museum) is now only known through the print made by van Reesbroeck after his own work.
