= Bernardino da Balbano =

Bernardino da Balbano (active 1543–1558) was a Capuchin friar from Balvano in Southern Italy who served as provincial superior in Apulia and Basilicata, and as guardian of the convent in Potenza.

He was reputed as a preacher, and was active in combatting the teachings of the Waldensians, which had received new impetus from the Protestant Reformation. After he had preached in Messina in 1552, the archbishop, Cardinal Giovanni Andrea Mercurio, sought papal intervention to have him return in 1554.

Although some biographers date his death to 1558, he probably died in 1570.

From around 1600, his writings were being promoted north of the Alps by the Capuchin community in Paris.

== Writings ==
Balbano produced a number of works both in Italian and in Latin. His best known were:

- Specchio d'orazione (Rome and Parma, 1537), many times reprinted to 1605
  - French translation by Jean Blancone, Miroir de l'oraison (Paris 1601)
  - Spanish translation (Zaragoza, 1604)
  - Latin translation, Speculum orationis (Munich, 1627)
- Il mistero della flagellazione di N. S. Gesù Cristo (Venice, 1537)
  - French translation by Robert Le Fizelier (Paris, 1601)
  - Dutch translation by Philip Numan, Theylich Mysterie van die Gheesselinghe ons Heeren Iesu Christi (Leuven, 1607; 1611)
  - French translation by Antoine Gazet, La Sacré Mystère de la flagellation de nostre Sauveur (Rouen, 1610)
  - German translation (Trier, 1618)
  - Latin translation, Mysterium sacrae flagellationis domini nostri Jesu Christi (Cologne, 1625)
- De novem effusionibus sanguinis D. N. Iesu Christi (Venice, 1559; Paris, 1601)
- Tractatus de praedestinatione (Venice, 1593)
