= Ladislas Jonart =

French cleric, bishop, and archbishop

- Archbishop of Cambrai
- Church: Catholic
- Diocese: Cambrai
- See: Notre Dame de Cambrai
- Elected: 1668
- Installed: 4 April 1671
- Predecessor: Gaspard Nemius
- Successor: Jacques-Théodore de Bryas
- Other posts: Bishop of Arras; Bishop of Saint-Omer

Personal details
- Born: 1594 Mons, County of Hainaut, Habsburg Netherlands
- Died: 22 September 1674 (aged 79–80) Cambrai, Cambrésis, Habsburg Netherlands

Ladislas Jonart (1594–1674) was a clergyman from the Low Countries who was named in turn bishop of Arras, bishop of Saint-Omer, and archbishop of Cambrai. In the last position he was, ex officio, duke of Cambrai and count of Cambrésis.

== Life ==
Jonart was born in Mons in 1594. He was ordained in Cambrai and held a canonry of the cathedral there. He was elected dean on 3 December 1635 and went on to serve as vicar general of the diocese. During a mutiny of the garrison in the city, he personally advanced the money to pay the troops. In 1652 he was named bishop of Arras, but as the city was under French occupation he was never installed. In 1656 he was appointed to Saint-Omer instead, taking possession of the see by procuration on 20 September 1662 and being enthroned as bishop on 28 May 1663. In 1668 he was elected to succeed Gaspard Nemius as archbishop of Cambrai. He was only installed as archbishop on 4 April 1671, distributing the episcopal income that had accrued during the vacancy to the poor. He died on 22 September 1674, leaving his goods in trust to alleviate poverty in the city and to aid distressed bourgeois. He was buried in his cathedral.

Catholic Church titles
Preceded by Jean-Pierre Camus	Bishop of Arras nominated but never installed	Succeeded by Étienne Moreau
Preceded by Christophe de France	Bishop of Saint-Omer; 1662–1671	Succeeded by Jacques-Théodore de Bryas
Preceded by Gaspard Nemius	Archbishop of Cambrai; 1671–1674	Succeeded by Jacques-Théodore de Bryas
