= Antoine Gazet =

Antoine Gazet (active 1595–1610) was a physician and translator in the Habsburg Netherlands. He was born in Aire-sur-la-Lys around the middle of the 16th century and was educated at least in part in Italy. After returning from Italy he lived for several years in Aire, where his presence is attested in the parish records of Saint-Pierre d'Aire up to 1610. He was the brother of the poet and ecclesiastical historian Guillaume Gazet.

== Translations ==
- Bernardino da Balbano, Le sacre mystere de la flagellation de nostre sauveur (Arras, Jean Bourgeois, 1595)
- Fulvio Androzzi, Devot memorial des saints mysteres de la mort et passion de nostre sauveur et redempteur Jesus Christ (Arras, Jean Bourgeois, 1595)
- Fulvio Androzzi, Traictè de la frequente communion et des fruicts qui en procedent (Douai, Jan Bogard, 1599)
