= Gaspard Nemius =

Sixth bishop of Antwerp

Illustrious and Most Reverend Doctor Gaspard Nemius
- Archbishop of Cambrai
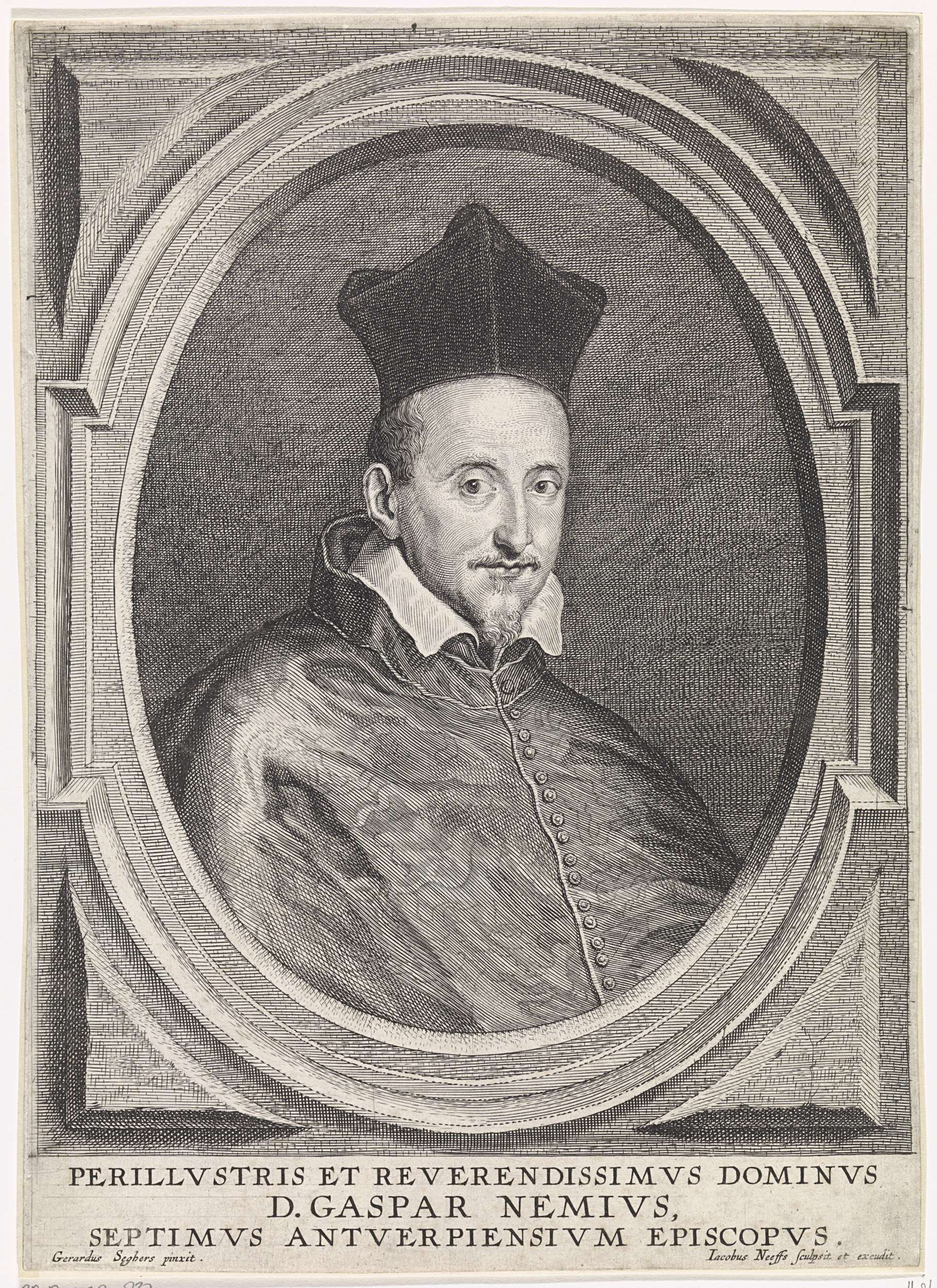
- Portrait of Gaspard Nemius, engraved by Jacob Neefs after Gerard Seghers
- Church: Roman Catholic
- Diocese: Cambrai
- See: Notre Dame de Cambrai
- Elected: 24 August 1649
- Installed: 19 March 1652
- Predecessor: Joseph de Bergaigne
- Successor: Ladislas Jonart
- Other post: Bishop of Antwerp (1635–1651)

Orders
- Consecration: 22 July 1635

Personal details
- Born: 23 April 1587 's-Hertogenbosch, Duchy of Brabant, Spanish Netherlands
- Died: 22 November 1667 (aged 80) Cambrai, Spanish Netherlands
- Education: Theology
- Alma mater: University of Douai

Gaspard du Bois, Latinized Nemius (1587–1667) was the sixth bishop of Antwerp and the ninth archbishop of Cambrai.

== Life ==
Nemius was born in 's-Hertogenbosch on 23 April 1587. He studied at the University of Douai, graduating Doctor of Sacred Theology, and went on to lecture in Theology there. On 23 May 1634 he was appointed bishop of Antwerp, and he was consecrated in Antwerp Cathedral on 22 July 1635. On 10 October 1642 he founded a confraternity of the Blessed Trinity in St. James' Church, Antwerp, to support the work of the Trinitarian Order in redeeming Christian captives.

On 24 August 1649 he was elected archbishop of Cambrai. The election received papal confirmation in 1651, and he was installed 19 March 1652. He died in Cambrai on 22 November 1667 and was buried in the choir of the cathedral.

Catholic Church titles
Preceded by Johannes Malderus	Bishop of Antwerp; 1635–1651	Succeeded by Ambrosius Capello
Preceded by Joseph de Bergaigne	Archbishop of Cambrai; 1652–1667	Succeeded by Ladislas Jonart
