= Jacques-Théodore de Bryas =

- Archbishop of Cambrai
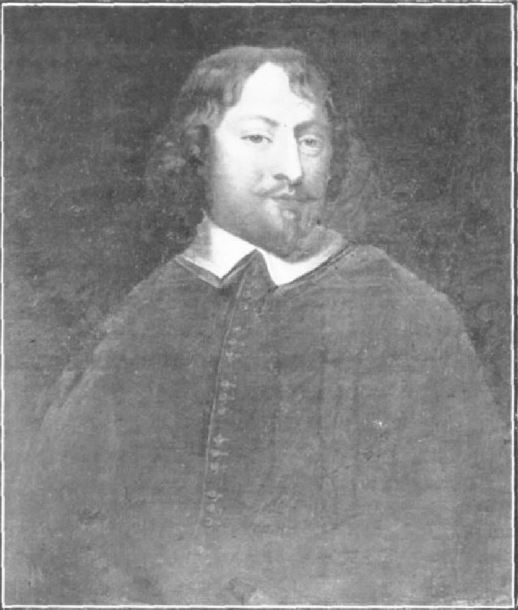
- Jacques-Théodore de Bryas
- Church: Catholic
- Diocese: Cambrai
- See: Notre Dame de Cambrai
- Installed: 28 October 1675
- Term ended: 16 November 1694
- Predecessor: Ladislas Jonart
- Successor: François Fénelon
- Other post: Bishop of Saint-Omer
- Previous post: Ecclesiastical councillor on the Great Council of Mechelen

Orders
- Consecration: 29 May 1672

Personal details
- Born: 1630 Mariembourg, County of Hainaut, Habsburg Netherlands
- Died: 16 November 1694 (aged 63–64) Cambrai, Cambrésis, Kingdom of France
- Parents: Charles de Bryas and Anne Philiberte de Lierre d'Immerseele
- Profession: Canonist
- Education: University of Douai
- Motto: Difficiliora quae pulchra

Jacques-Théodore de Bryas (1630–1694) was a clergyman from the Low Countries who was in turn bishop of Saint-Omer and archbishop of Cambrai. In the last position he was, ex officio, duke of Cambrai and count of Cambrésis. He was the last archbishop to be elected by the cathedral chapter rather than nominated by the King of France.

== Life ==
De Bryas was born in Mariembourg, the second son of Count Charles de Bryas and Anne Philiberte de Lierre d'Immerseele. After studying canon law at the University of Douai, he obtained a canonry of Tournai Cathedral in 1655. By letters patent of 12 December 1666 he was appointed ecclesiastical councillor on the Great Council of Mechelen, the highest law court in the Habsburg Netherlands.

In 1671, de Bryas was named bishop of Saint-Omer in succession to Ladislas Jonart, who had just been translated to Cambrai. He took possession of the see by procuration on 11 April 1672 and made his solemn entry into the see on 11 June 1672. At Jonart's death, de Bryas again succeeded him, now as archbishop of Cambrai, where he was installed on 28 October 1675. Eighteen months later, Louis XIV took control of the city at the conclusion of the Siege of Cambrai, and by the Treaties of Nijmegen the Habsburgs ceded the duchy of Cambrai to French control. A report to the new king described the archbishop as eating simply off pewter tableware, and spending his free time visiting the sick and prisoners.

On 30 August 1682, the cathedral chapter formally relinquished their ancient privilege of electing the bishop, bringing the diocese into line with the rest of France, where the nomination of bishops was a royal prerogative.

De Bryas died on 16 November 1694.

Catholic Church titles
Preceded by Ladislas Jonart	Bishop of Saint-Omer; 1672–1675	Succeeded by Jean Charles de Longueval
Preceded by Ladislas Jonart	Archbishop of Cambrai; 1675–1694	Succeeded by François Fénelon
