= Louis Richeome =

French theologian

Louis Richeome (1544–1625) was a French Jesuit theologian and controversialist. He also wrote under the pseudonyms "Ludovicus de Beaumanoir", "Felix de la Grace", and "Franciscus Montanus".

== Life ==
Richeome was born in Digne in 1544. He studied at the Collège de Clermont under Juan Maldonado and in 1565 joined the Society of Jesus. In 1580 he was appointed principal of the student residence at the university of Pont-à-Mousson. He was instrumental in the Jesuit residence in Bordeaux being allowed to reopen its college in 1603. In 1605 he was appointed Father Provincial of the Lyon Province, and from 1608 to 1616 was in Rome as assistant to Superior General Claudio Acquaviva. Richeome died in Bordeaux on 15 September 1625.

== Publications ==
- L'adieu de l'âme devote laissant le corps (Tournon, Claude Michel and Guillaume Linocier, 1593)
- as François des Montaignes, La verité defendue pour la religion catholique. En la cause des Jesuites, contre le plaidoyé d'Antoine Arnaud (Tolose, WIdow of Jacques Colomiez, 1595). Available on Google Books
  - as Franciscus Montanus, Apologia pro Societate Jesu in Gallia contra Antonii Arnaldi advocati parisiensis philippicam (Ingolstadt, Adam Sartorius, 1596). Available on Google Books
- Trois discours pour la religion catholique (Bordeaux, S. Millanges, 1599). Available on Google Books
- Tableaux sacrez des figures mystiques du tresauguste sacrifice et sacrement de l'Eucharistie (Paris, Laurens Sonnius, 1601). Available on Google Books
  - Holy Pictures of the Mysticall Figures of the Most Holy Sacrifice and Sacrament of the Eucharist, tr. C.A. (n.p., 1619).
- as Felix de la Grace, La chasse du renard Pasquin (Arras, Robert Maudhuy, 1603). Available on Google Books
- Le Pélerin de Lorète (Bordeaux, S. Millanges, 1604). Available on Google Books
  - Peregrinus Lauretanus, tr. Johann Haickstein (Cologne, Joannes Crithius, 1612). Available on Google Books
  - The Pilgrime of Loreto, tr. Edward Walpole (Paris, 1629)
- Expostulatio apologetica ad Henricum IV. pro Societate Jesu (Lyon, Horatius Cardon, 1606). Available on Google Books
- Miracula quae ad invocationem Beatissimae Virginis Mariae apud Tungros, Camberones et Servios in Hannonia ac Dominam gaudiorum in Picardia vulgo notre Dame de Liesse dictam effulsere ab anno 1081 ad annum usque 1605 (Douai, Charles Boscard, 1606). Available on Google Books
- L'idolatrie huguenote (Rouen, Honoré Malard, 1607) Available on Google Books
  - Idololatria Huguenotica, tr. Marcellinus Bompar (Mainz, Petrus Henigus, 1613). Available on Google Books
- Valedictio Animae Devotae (Cologne, Petrus Henningus, 1610). Available on Google Books
- La peinture spirituelle (Lyon, Pierre Rigaud, 1611). Available on Google Books
- Justa anniversaria Henrico Magno (Antwerp, Hieronymus Verdussen, 1613). Available on Google Books
- Examen catégorique du libelle Anticoton (Pont-à-Mousson, Melchior Bernard, 1613). Available on Google Books
- as Ludovicus de Beaumanoir, Expostulatoria defensio ad senatum (n.p., 1615) Available on Google Books
- De Ratione migrandi ad meliorem vitam (Cologne, Petrus Henningus, 1617). Available on Google Books
- L' Immortalité de l'Ame (Paris, Sebastien Cramoisy, 1621). Available on Google Books
- Œuvres du R. Pere Louis Richeome (Paris, Sebastien Cramoisy, 1628), vol. 1 on Google Books.
