= Guillaume Gazet =

Gulielmus Gazaeus

Personal details
- Born: Guillaume Gazet; 1554 Arras, Artois, Habsburg Netherlands
- Died: 1612 (aged 57–58) Arras, Artois, Spanish Netherlands

Guillaume Gazet, Latinized Gulielmus Gazaeus (1554–1612) was a poet and ecclesiastical historian in the Spanish Netherlands. His brother, Antoine Gazet, was a physician and translator.

== Life ==
Gazet was born in Arras, then part of the Habsburg Netherlands (now in France), in 1554. Around 1580 he was appointed parish priest of the church of Sainte-Marie-Madeleine in Arras, and later became a canon of the collegiate church of Saint-Pierre in Aire-sur-la-Lys while retaining his position as parish priest.

He died in Arras on 25 August 1612 and was buried in his parish church there.

== Works ==
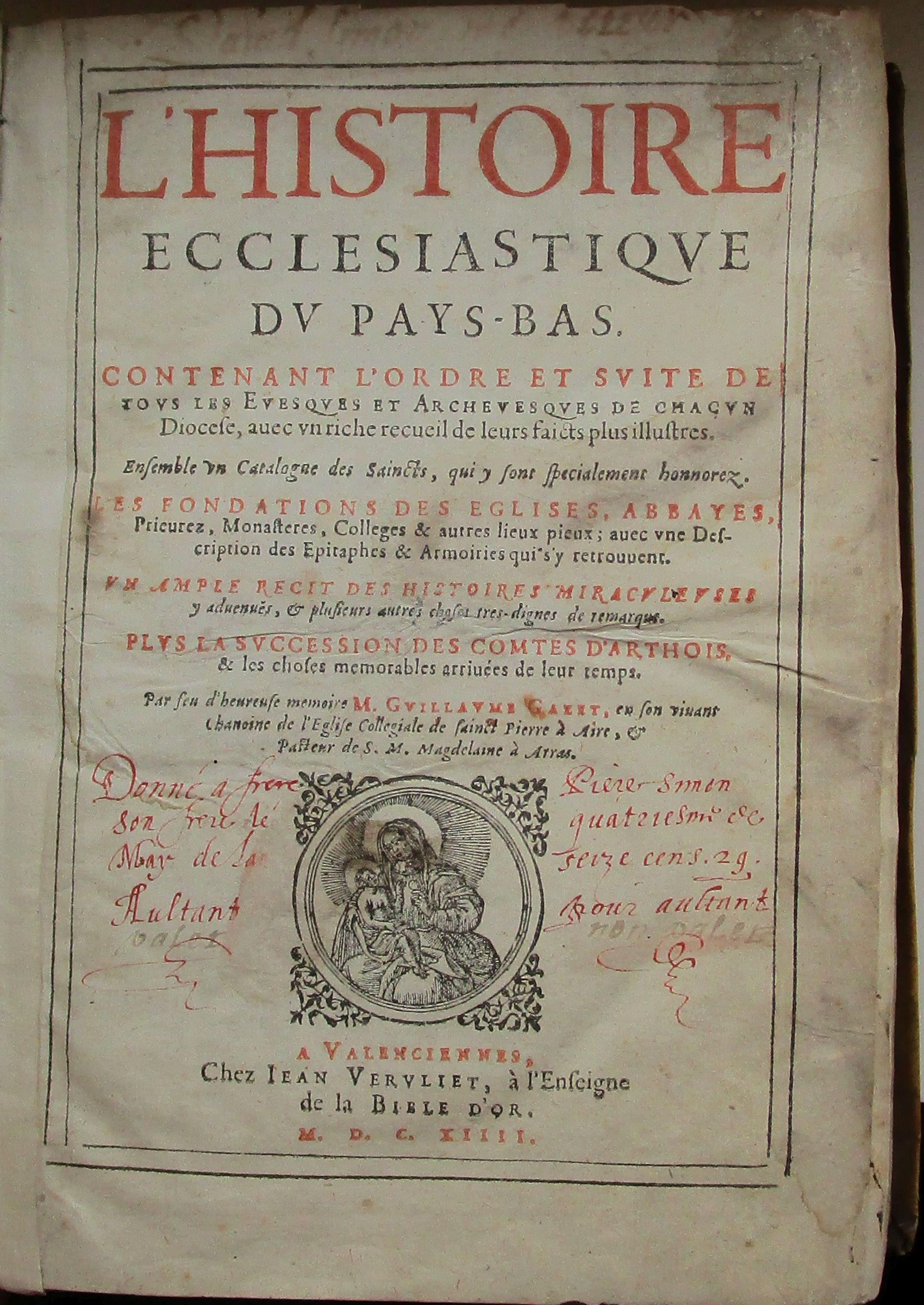
Titlepage of Gazet's Church history of the Low Countries (Valenciennes, 1614).

=== As author ===
- Magdalis. Comoedia sacra (Douai, Jan Bogard, 1589)
- Chanson nouvelle pour l'heureux succez de l'armée catholicque ensemble, de la prinse des ville et chasteau de Calais (Arras, Robert Maudhuy, 1596)
- L'ordre et suite des evesques et archevesques de Cambray (Arras, Gilles Baudouin, 1597)
- L'ordre des evesques d'Arras depuis la separation de l'evesché de Cambray (Arras, Gilles Baudouin, 1598)
- L'ordre et suyte des evesques de Cambray et d'Arras (Arras, chez Gilles Baudouin, 1598)
- Briève histoire de la sacrée manne et de la sainte chandelle miraculeusement données de Dieu et religieusement conservées en la ville et cité d'Arras (Arras, Gilles Baudouin, 1598)
- Le cabinet des Dames: contenant l'ornement spirituel de la femme (Arras, Gilles Baudouin, 1602). Available on Google Books
- Le consolateur des ames scrupvleuses (Arras, Robert Maudhuy, 1610. Available on Google Books
- Tableaux sacrez de la Gaule Belgique (Arras, Guillaume de la Rivière, 1610). Available on Google Books
- La Bibliotheque Sacree du Pays-Bas (Arras, Guillaume de la Rivière, 1610). Available on Google Books
- L'Histoire ecclésiastique des Pays-Bas (Arras, Guillaume de la Rivière, 1614). Available on Google Books

=== As editor ===
- Simeon Metaphrastes, Histoire de la vie, mort, passion et miracles des saints (Arras, Jean Bourgeois, 1584; reissued Arras 1596; Douai 1598)
- Juan de Polanco, Directoire des confesseurs (Lyon, Nicolas Choquenot, 1598; reissued Douai, 1599)
- Various authors, Thesaurus precum et litaniarum (Arras, Robert Maudhuy, 1601). Available on Google Books
