= Ambrosius Capello =

Ambrosius Capello O.P.
- Bishop of Antwerp
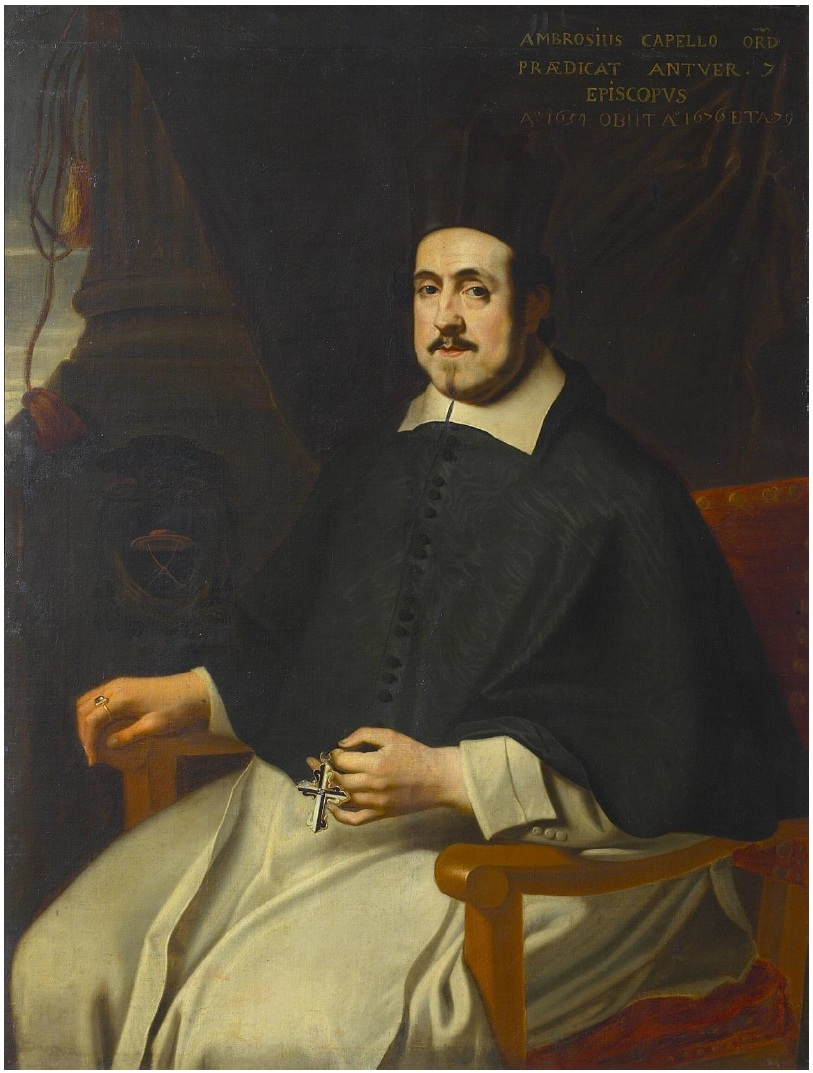
- Portrait of Capello by Jacob van Reesbroeck (1659)
- Church: Roman Catholic
- Diocese: Antwerp
- See: Cathedral of Our Lady (Antwerp)
- Appointed: 1652
- Installed: 1654
- Term ended: 1676
- Predecessor: Gaspard Nemius
- Successor: Aubertus van den Eede

Orders
- Consecration: 13 September 1654

Personal details
- Born: 22 June 1597 Antwerp
- Died: 4 October 1676 (aged 79) Antwerp
- Buried: Antwerp Cathedral
- Profession: 21 November 1613
- Education: Theology
- Alma mater: University of Douai; University of Salamanca; University of Leuven

Ambrosius Capello (1597–1676) was the seventh bishop of Antwerp (1654–1676).

== Life ==
Capello was born in Antwerp on 22 June 1597, the son of an Italian military contractor, Jean-François Capello, and a Netherlandish lady, Marie de Boxhorn. He entered the Dominican Order in 1612 and studied Theology in the universities of Douai, Salamanca and Leuven. He obtained the degree of Doctor of Theology in Leuven in 1627.

He held a number of positions of responsibility in his order – prior of several houses, definitor for the Belgian province, deputy of the province to the general chapter – and in 1642 he was named vice-prefect of the Dutch Mission. In 1652 he was named bishop of Antwerp, but the appointment was not confirmed until 1654. On 13 September 1654, he was consecrated bishop by his predecessor, Gaspard Nemius, who had been transferred to the archdiocese of Cambrai. As bishop, he founded a number of scholarships and a retirement home for aged priests.

Wilhelmus Foppens's Dutch translation of the Roman Catechism (printed by François Foppens for Joachim van Metelen, Antwerp, 1668; reprinted 1687, 1701) was dedicated to him.

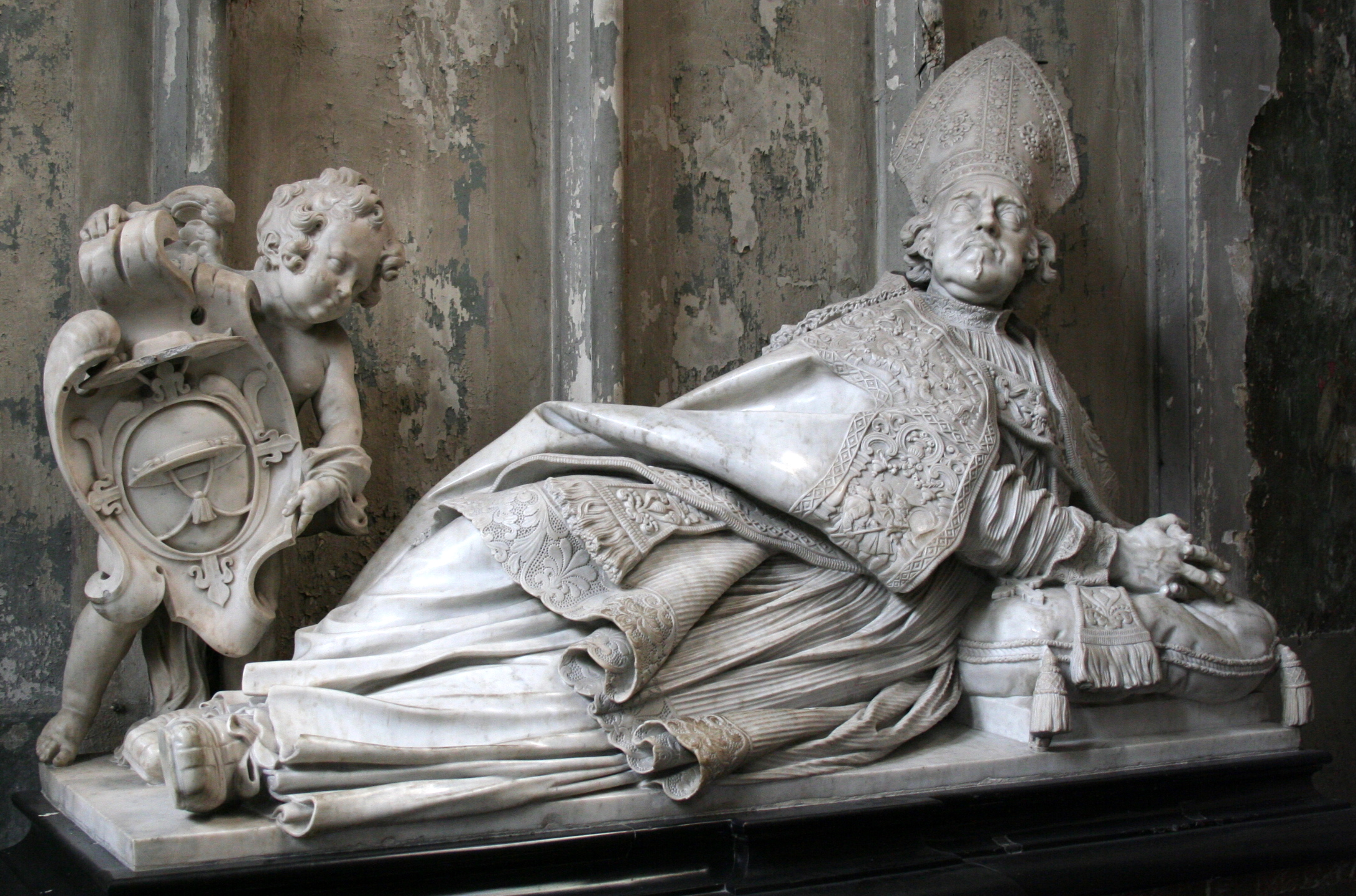
Monumental tomb of Ambrosius Capello, designed by Artus Quellinus II

Capello died in Antwerp on 4 October 1676, leaving all his worldly goods to the poor. His ornate Baroque tomb in Antwerp Cathedral, designed by Artus Quellinus II, was the only one to survive the French Revolution.

Catholic Church titles
Preceded by Gaspard Nemius	Bishop of Antwerp; 1652–1676	Succeeded by Aubertus van den Eede
