= Maximilien de Wignacourt =

Flemish writer (1560–1620)

Maximilien de Wignacourt, alternatively Vignacourt or Vignacurtius (1560–1620) was a writer in Latin and French in the Spanish Netherlands.

== Life ==
Wignacourt was born in Arras in 1560, a nephew of the renowned jurist François Baudouin. In the late 1570s he studied at the University of Leuven under Justus Lipsius, to whom he wrote a letter (now in Leiden University Library) on 9 November 1586. In 1582 he entered the service of Bernardino de Mendoza in England, and on his recommendation seems to have become a hanger-on at the court of Philip II of Spain. His poems of commemoration and congratulation for powerful figures provided a meagre income. By 1602 he was attached to the court in Brussels. He died in Leuven on 21 November 1620.

== Works ==
- Sereniss. Parmae et Placentiae ducis nominis anagrammatismus (n.p.d. [1586])
- Discours sur l'estat des Pays Bas, auquel sont déduictes les causes de ses troubles et calamitez et leurs remèdes (Arras, Guillaume de la Riviere, 1593).
- Serenissimi Ernesti adventum gratulatur Belgicae Maxaemyliani V (Brussels, Jan Mommaert, 1594). On 26 March 1594 Wignacourt was awarded 15 florins in thanks for this poem.
- In res Belgicas deinosis (Antwerp, Andreas Bax, 1596).
- Antistitis praecellentis euphemia (Arras, Robert Maudhuy, 1605). Congratulatory verses on the occasion of Nicolas Mainfroy's enthronement as abbot of Saint-Bertin.
- Preliminary verses included in Estienne Ydens, Histoire du S. sacrement du miracle reposant à Bruxelles (Brussels, Rutger Velpius, 1605).
- Pro eutrapelia seriis interposita per Isabellam Claram Eugeniam, regiam ex Hispania progeniem, archiducem Austriae, principem ditionum Belgicae Inferioris apologia (Leuven, Gerard Rivius, 1615)
