= Robert Maudhuy =

Robert Maudhuy was a printer and bookseller active in the city of Arras (County of Artois) from the 1590s until his death on 19 July 1632. He printed at the sign of the Name of Jesus.

== Publications ==
- 1595: Poeme sur la bataille donnee au siege de Dourlens par le duc de Bouillon le 24. de Juillet 1595.
- 1596: Discours veritable des choses advenues au siege de Calais.
- 1596: Guillaume Gazet, Chanson nouvelle pour l'heureux succez de l'armée catholicque ensemble, de la prinse des ville et chasteau de Calais.
- 1596: Lodovico Guicciardini, Sommaire de la description générale de tous les Pays Bas, ed. B. Rohault. Available on Google Books
- 1597: Joseph Creswell, Histoire de la vie et ferme constance du pere Henry Valpole anglais prestre de la compagnie de Jesus.
- 1597: Discours veritable des choses plus remarquables advenues en la prinse de la ville d'Amyens par les gens de sa Majesté Catholique sous la conduite du Gouverneur de Doullens l'onsiesme tour de Mars 1597.
- 1599: Placart de son Alteze Serenissime contenant la declaration des bons devoirs faicts vers ceux de Hollande & Zelande pour les amener a une reconciliation. Available on Google Books
- 1600: Franciscus Clicquetius, Placart à la louange des archiducs Albert et Isabelle, à l'occasion de leur joyeuse entrée à Arras.
- 1600: Coustumes générales du pays et conté d'Arthois. Available on Google Books
- 1600: La Flandre conservée, contenant un discours en forme de lettre, des desseigns & evenementz de l'Armée rebelle en l'Année 1600. Available on Google Books
- 1601: Guillaume Gazet (ed.), Thesaurus precum et litaniarum. Available on Google Books
- 1602: Adrien Lebrun, Recreation d'esprit aux amateurs de chaste poesie.
- 1603: Felix de la Grace (pseudonym of Louis Richeome), La chasse du renard pasquin. Available on Google Books
- 1604: Le psaultier du S. Esprit. Available on Google Books
- 1605: Maximilien de Wignacourt, Antistitis praecellentis euphemia.
- 1605: Antoine de Nerveze, Recueil des traictez spirituels.
- 1607: Richard Bristow, Antihaeretica Motiva, vol. 2. Available on Google Books
- 1608: Ferry de Locre, Maria Augusta virgo deipara in VII libros tributa, chronico et notis. Available on Google Books
- 1610: Guillaume Gazet, Le consolateur des ames scrupuleuses. Available on Google Books
- 1611: Antonio Bosio, Histoire renouvelée de la vie et martyre de Ste Cécile, tr. C.D.C. Available on Google Books
- 1612: Paul Boudot, Harangue funèbre faicte et prononcée avec funérailles solennelles de l'empereur Rodolphe II, prononcée à Bruxelles. Available on Google Books
- 1619: Alessio da Salo, La mariade. Available on Google Books
