= Ancient Diocese of Saint-Omer =

Roman Catholic diocese in France (1559 - 1801)

Coordinates: 50.75°N 2.25°E

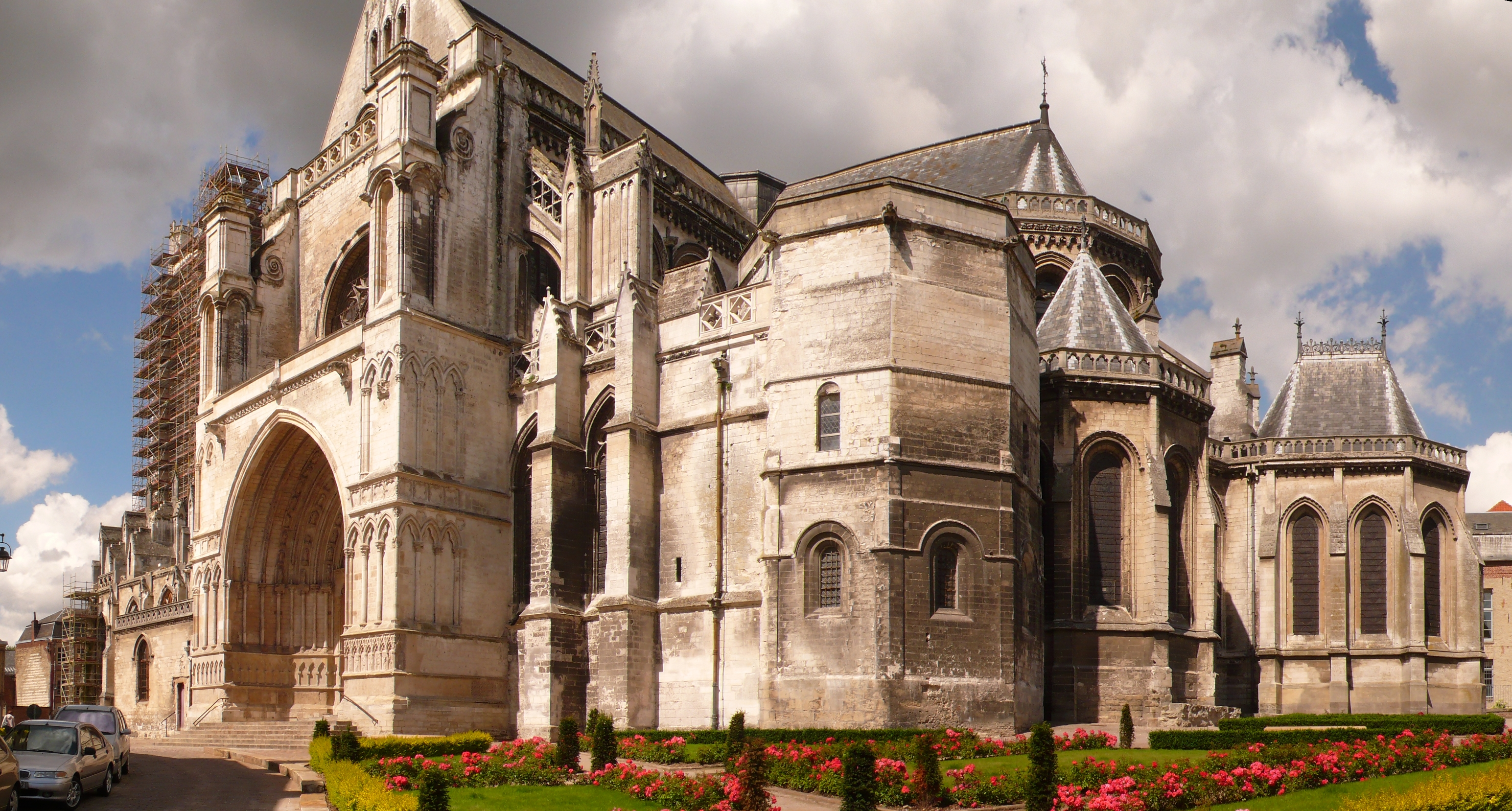
Saint-Omer Cathedral

The former French Catholic diocese of Saint-Omer existed from 1559 until the French Revolution, with its episcopal seat in Saint-Omer Cathedral in Saint-Omer, in the modern department of Pas-de-Calais The diocese was created as a reaction to the destruction of the see of Thérouanne by military action in the wars of the Emperor Charles V. It then became a suffragan of the Archdiocese of Cambrai in 1559.

By the Concordat of 1801, the diocese of Saint-Omer was united with the diocese of Arras and the diocese of Boulogne, to form an enlarged diocese of Arras.

== Bishops ==
- Guillaume de Poitiers 1561
- Gérard de Haméricourt 1563-1577
- Jean Six 1581-1586
- Jacques de Pamèle 1587
- Jean de Vernois, O.P., 1591-1599
- Jacques Blaseus, O.F.M. Rec., 1600-1618 (previously bishop of Namur)
- Paul Boudot 1618-1626 (then bishop of Arras)
- Pierre Paunet, O.F.M., 1628-1631
- Christophe de Morlet 1632-1633
- Christophe de France 1635-1656
- Ladislas Jonart 1662-1671 (then archbishop of Cambrai)
- Jacques-Théodore de Bryas 1672-1675 (then archbishop of Cambrai)
- Jean Charles de Longueval 1676
- Pierre Van Den Perre 1577
- Armand-Anne-Tristan de La Baume de Suze 1677
- Louis-Alphonse de Valbelle 1677-1708 (previously bishop of Alet)
- François de Valbelle de Tourves 1708-1727
- Joseph-Alphonse de Valbelle de Tourves 1727-1754
- Pierre-Joseph de Brunes de Monlouet 1754-1765 (previously bishop of Dol)
- Louis-François-Marc-Hilaire de Conzié 1766-1769 (then bishop of Aire)
- Joachim-François-Mamert de Conzié 1769-1775 (then archbishop of Tours)
- Jean-Auguste de Chastenet de Puységur 1775-1778 (then bishop of Carcassonne)
- Alexandre-Joseph-Alexis de Bruyère de Chalabre 1778-1790 (1796)

== See also ==
- Catholic Church in France
- List of Catholic dioceses in France

== Bibliography ==
- Bled, Oscar (1898). Les évêques de Saint-Omer depuis la chute de Thérouanne, 1553-1619 (in French). Saint-Omer: H. d'Homont.
- Cochin, Claude (1905). "Recherches sur Stefano Colonna, prévôt du chapitre de Saint-Omer, cardinal d'Urbain VI et correspondent de Pétrarque," Revue d' histoire et de littérature religeuses 10 (1905) 352-383; 554-578.
- Ducrocq, Monique (1997). La cathédrale de Saint-Omer: son symbolisme, ses grands dignitaires (in French). Arras: M. Ducrocq. ISBN 978-2-9511397-0-1.
- Du Tems, Hugues (1775). Le clergé de France, ou tableau historique et chronologique des archevêques, évêques, abbés, abbesses et chefs des chapitres principaux du royaume, depuis la fondation des églises jusqu'à nos jours, par M. l'abbé Hugues Du Tems (in French). Vol. Tome IV. Paris: Brunet. pp. 199–129.
- Jean, Armand (1891). Les évêques et les archevêques de France depuis 1682 jusqu'à 1801 (in French). Paris: A. Picard. pp. 177–181.
- Gams, Pius Bonifatius (1873). Series episcoporum Ecclesiae catholicae: quotquot innotuerunt a beato Petro apostolo. Ratisbon: Typis et Sumptibus Georgii Josephi Manz. pp. 548–549. (Use with caution; obsolete)
- Eubel, Conradus, ed. (1913). Hierarchia catholica, Tomus 1 (second ed.). Münster: Libreria Regensbergiana. p. 301. (in Latin)
- Eubel, Conradus, ed. (1914). Hierarchia catholica, Tomus 2 (second ed.). Münster: Libreria Regensbergiana. p. 175.
- Eubel, Conradus, ed. (1923). Hierarchia catholica, Tomus 3 (second ed.). Münster: Libreria Regensbergiana.
- Gauchat, Patritius (Patrice) (1935). Hierarchia catholica IV (1592-1667). Münster: Libraria Regensbergiana. p. 219.
- Ritzler, Remigius; Sefrin, Pirminus (1952). Hierarchia catholica medii et recentis aevi V (1667-1730). Patavii: Messagero di S. Antonio.
- Jean, Armand (1891). Les évêques et les archevêques de France depuis 1682 jusqu'à 1801 (in French). Paris: A. Picard.
- Pisani, Paul (1907). Répertoire biographique de l'épiscopat constitutionnel (1791-1802) (in French). Paris: A. Picard et fils.
