= Saint-Omer Cathedral =

Cathedral located in Pas-de-Calais, France

Coordinates: 50°44′50″N 2°15′10″E

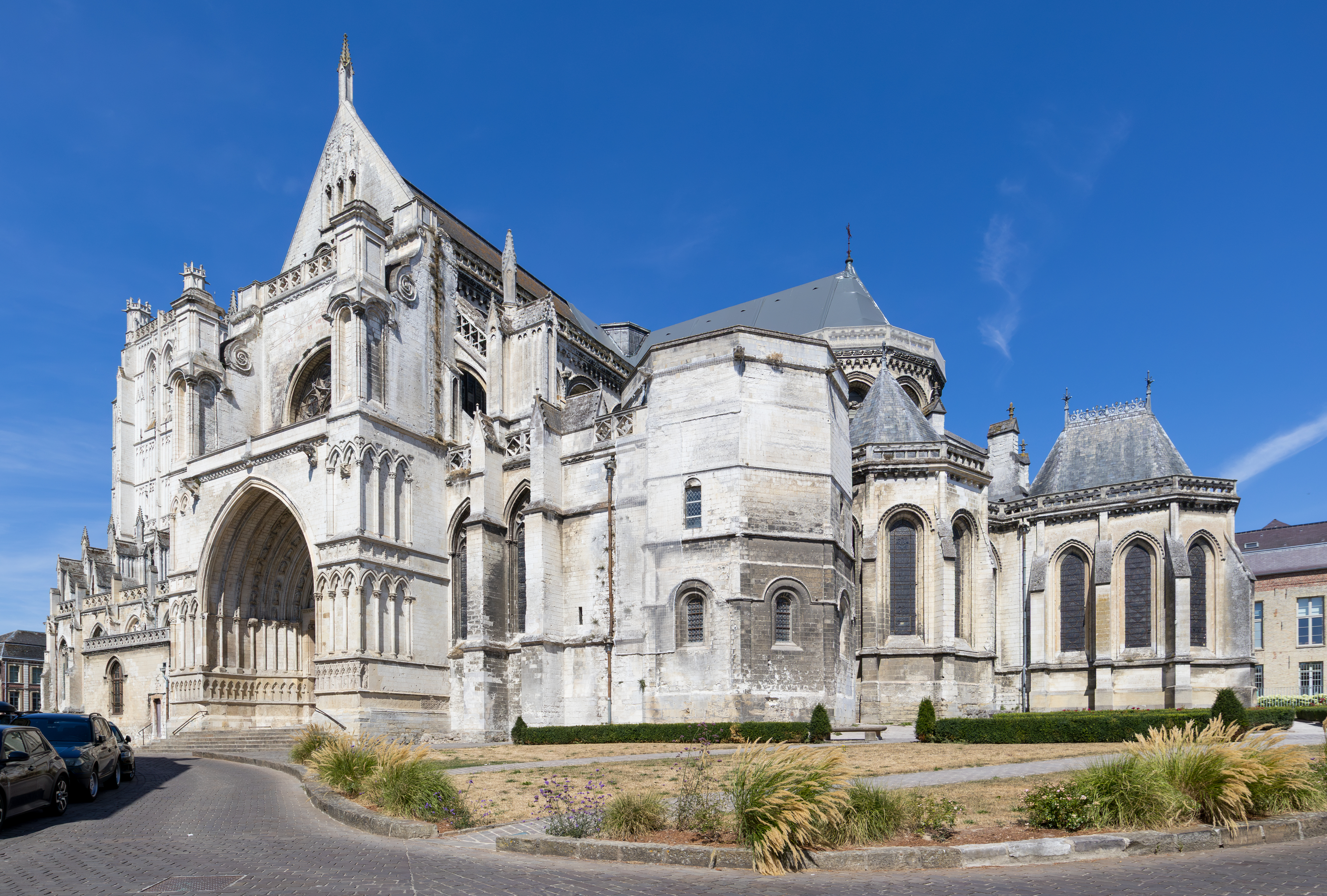
Saint-Omer Cathedral

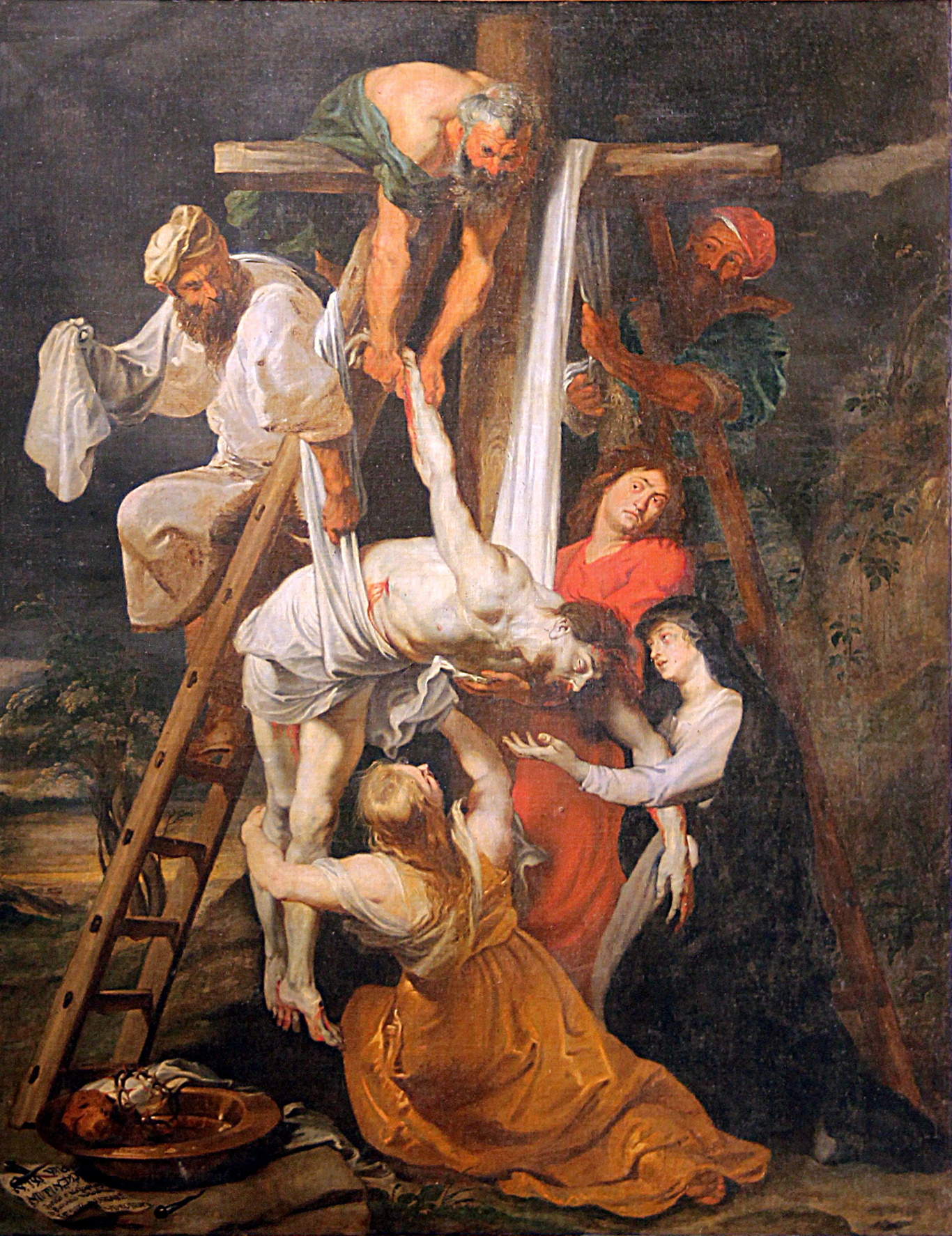
Painting of the Descent from the Cross by Peter Paul Rubens at Saint-Omer Cathedral, 1616

Saint-Omer Cathedral (Cathédrale Notre-Dame de Saint-Omer) is a former Catholic cathedral, a minor basilica, and a national monument of France. It is located in Saint-Omer. It was formerly the seat of the Bishop of Saint-Omer, but the bishopric was not restored after the French Revolution but was instead absorbed into the Diocese of Arras under the Concordat of 1801. The church, however, is still commonly referred to as the "cathedral".

== History ==
Originally a modest chapel from the 7th century, the church was built on the site around 1052.

It was damaged around 1200 by a fire. The choir, the ambulatory and the radiant chapels were then rebuilt, and in 1263 the transept was built. Work progressed slowly and spread across the 13th to the 16th century. Afterwards the church became collegiate.

The southern transept was extended from 1375 to 1379, and the nave was rebuilt. The lateral chapels of the nave date from 1386 to 1403. The oldest chapels were built in the south. The central nave was completed in 1473 and its vaults in 1506.

From 1449 to 1472, Jehan de Meldre, prime contractor, proceeded to extend the north cross-section of the transept. At that time the tower to the west, which had remained Romanesque, was consolidated and enhanced.

From 1473 to 1521, the western tower was built around the Romanesque tower. It was re-dressed and decorated in the style of the abbey church of Saint-Bertin (built between 1431 and 1500). The sculptures of the western portal were sculpted from 1511 to 1515 by the sculptors Bruges Jean and Josse Van der Poele.

The spire above the crossing dates back to 1486.

In 1553, the nearby town of Thérouanne, where the bishopric of Artois was located, was totally razed by the troops of Charles V, during a conflict that opposed the King of France Henry II. Salt was symbolically spread over the city floor.

In the years that followed, it was decided to share the diocese of Thérouanne, in order to respect the borders between the kingdom of France and the Spanish Netherlands. Thus, the diocese of Saint-Omer was created in 1559 and the collegiate church of Notre-Dame became a cathedral in 1561.

== Treasury ==
The Treasure House of the cathedral has a large number of important artworks and architectural features.

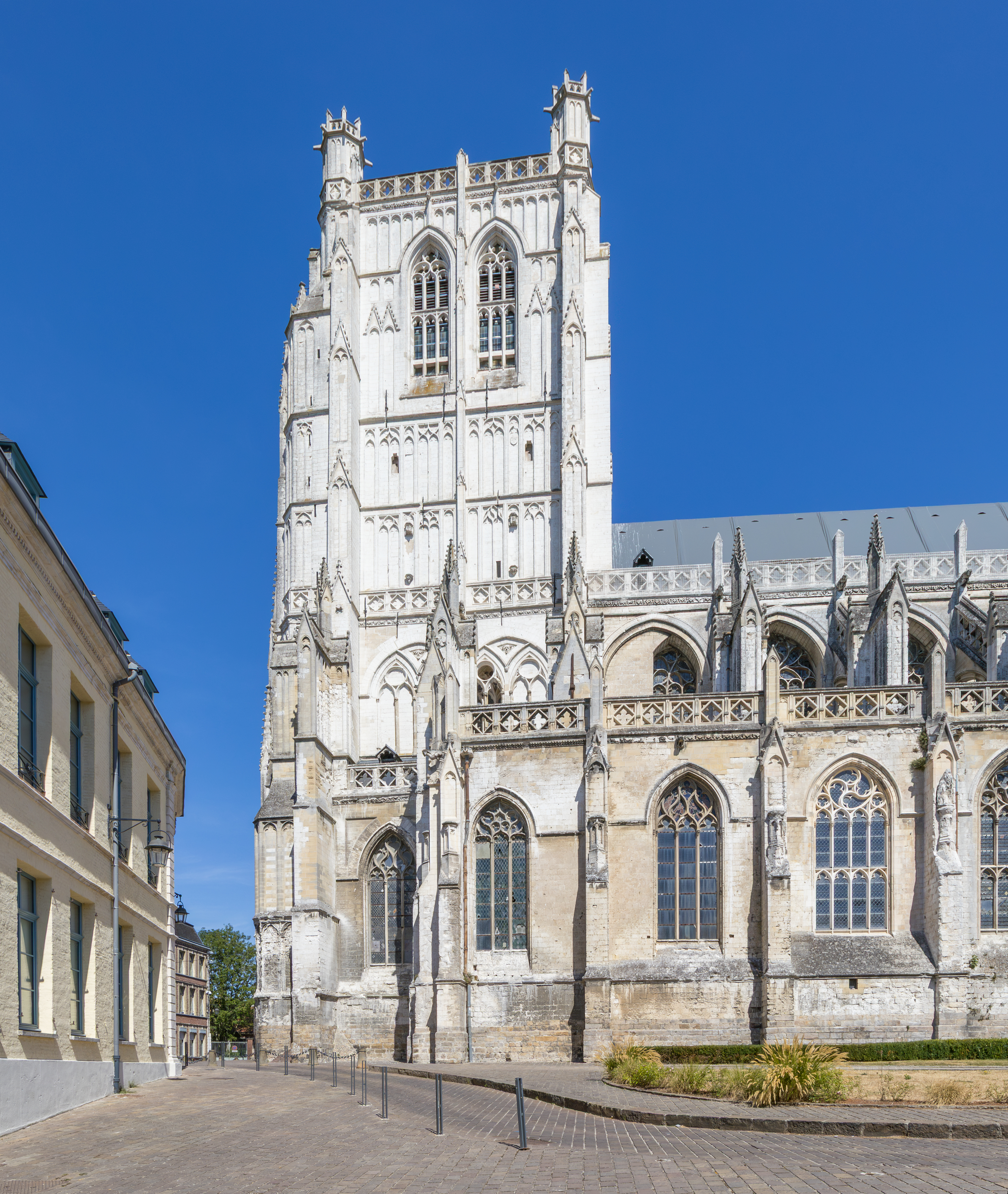
The bell tower

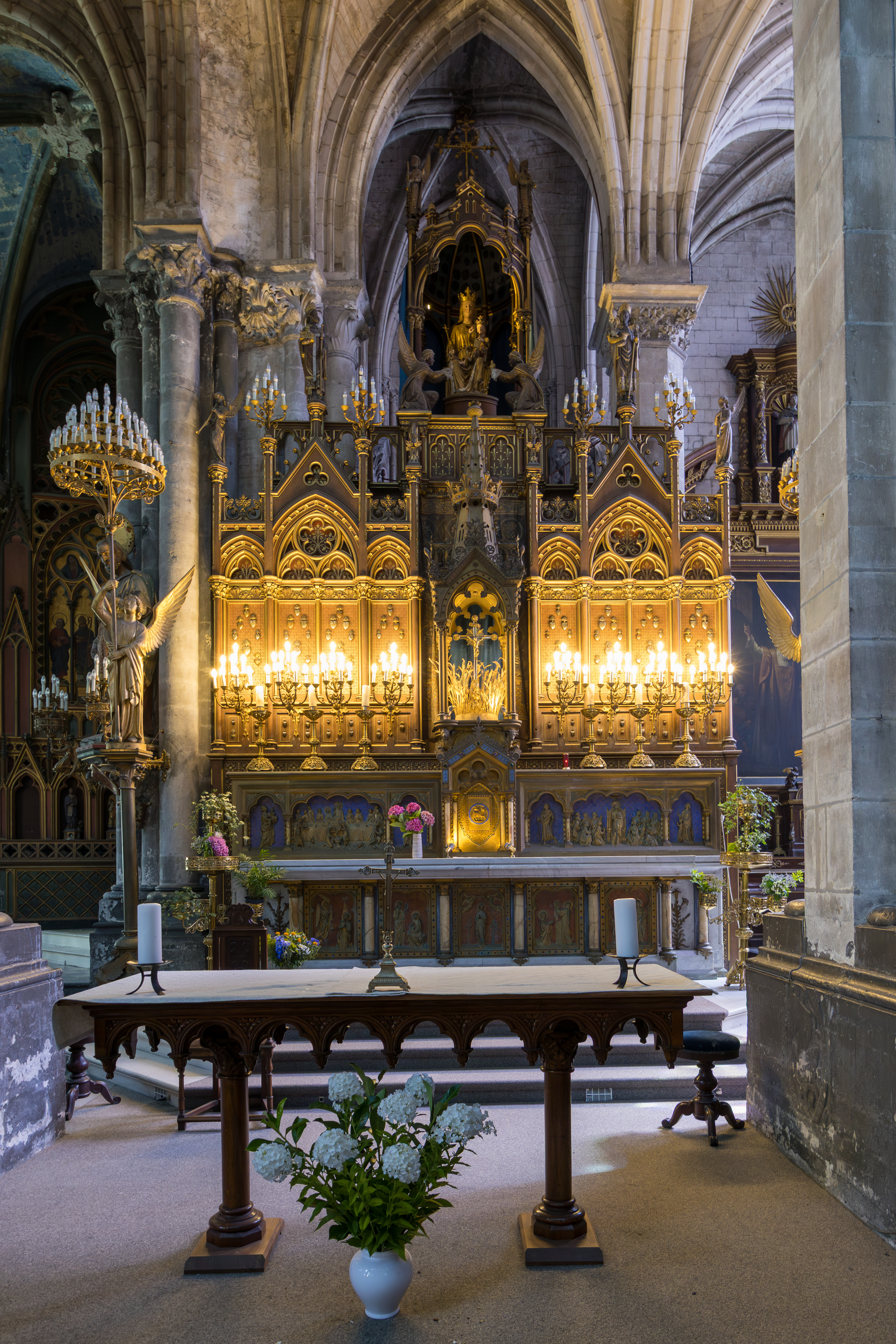
Altar of Notre-Dame des Miracles

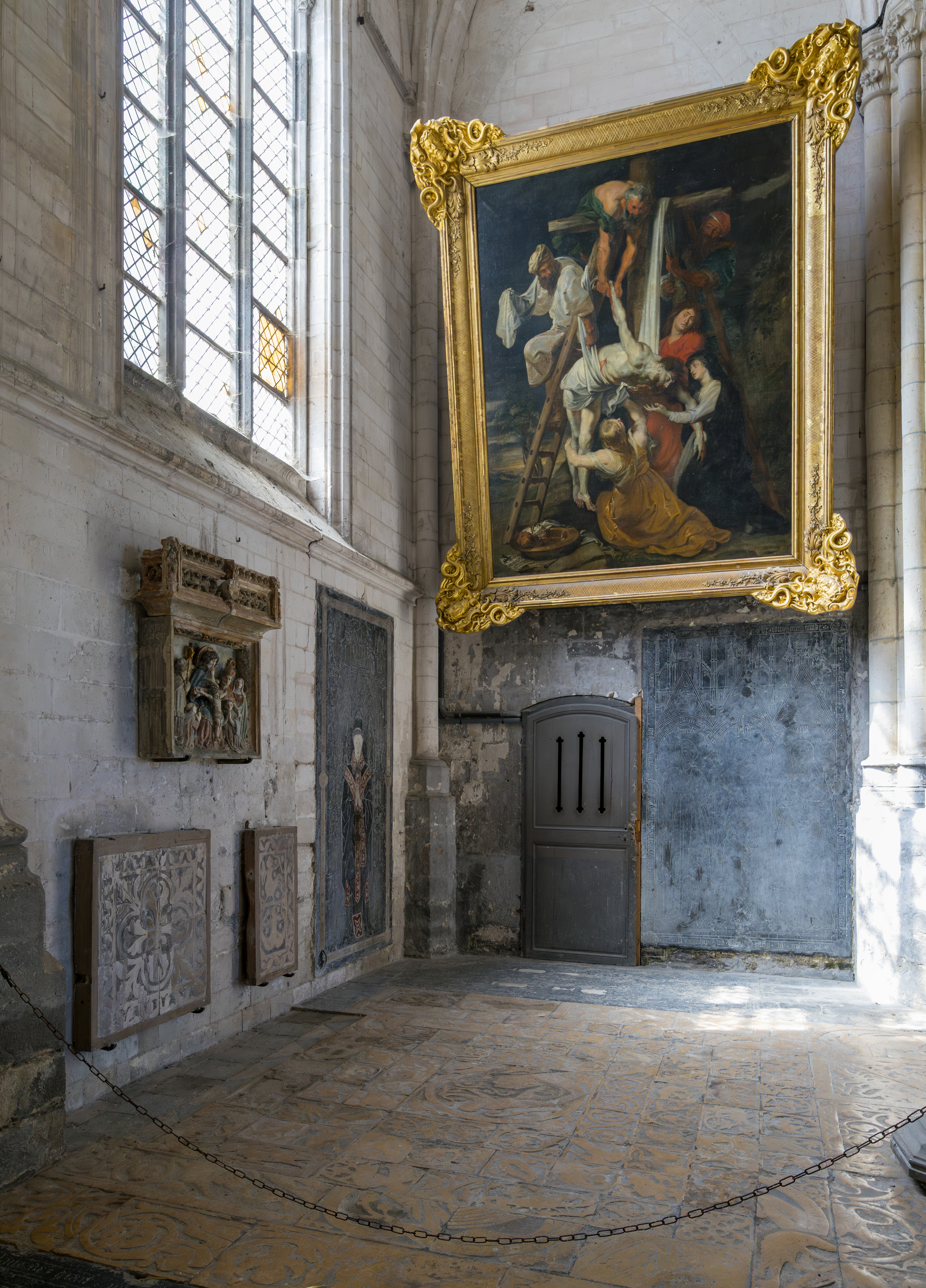
Descent from the Cross by P.P. Rubens

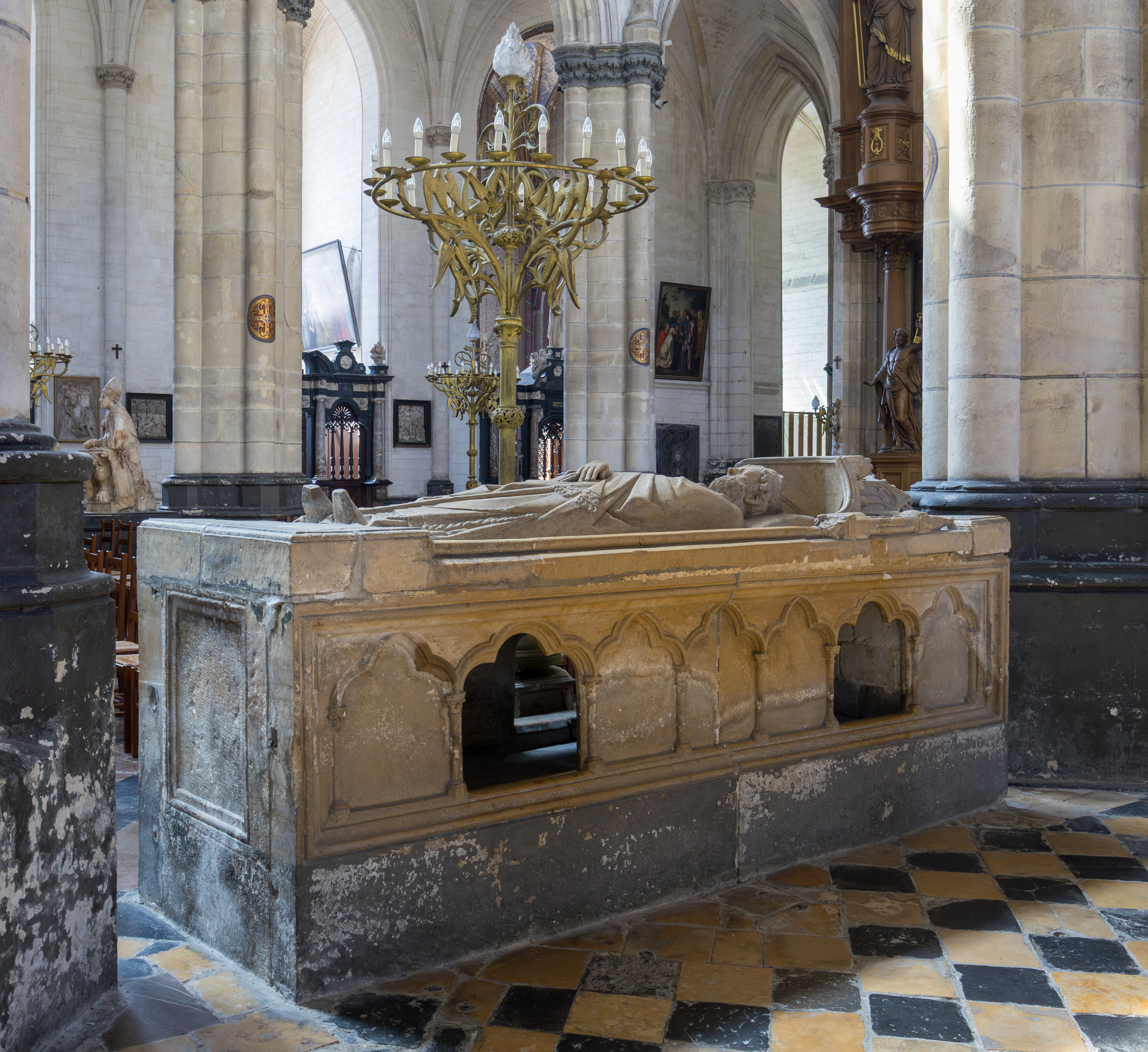
Tomb of Saint Omer

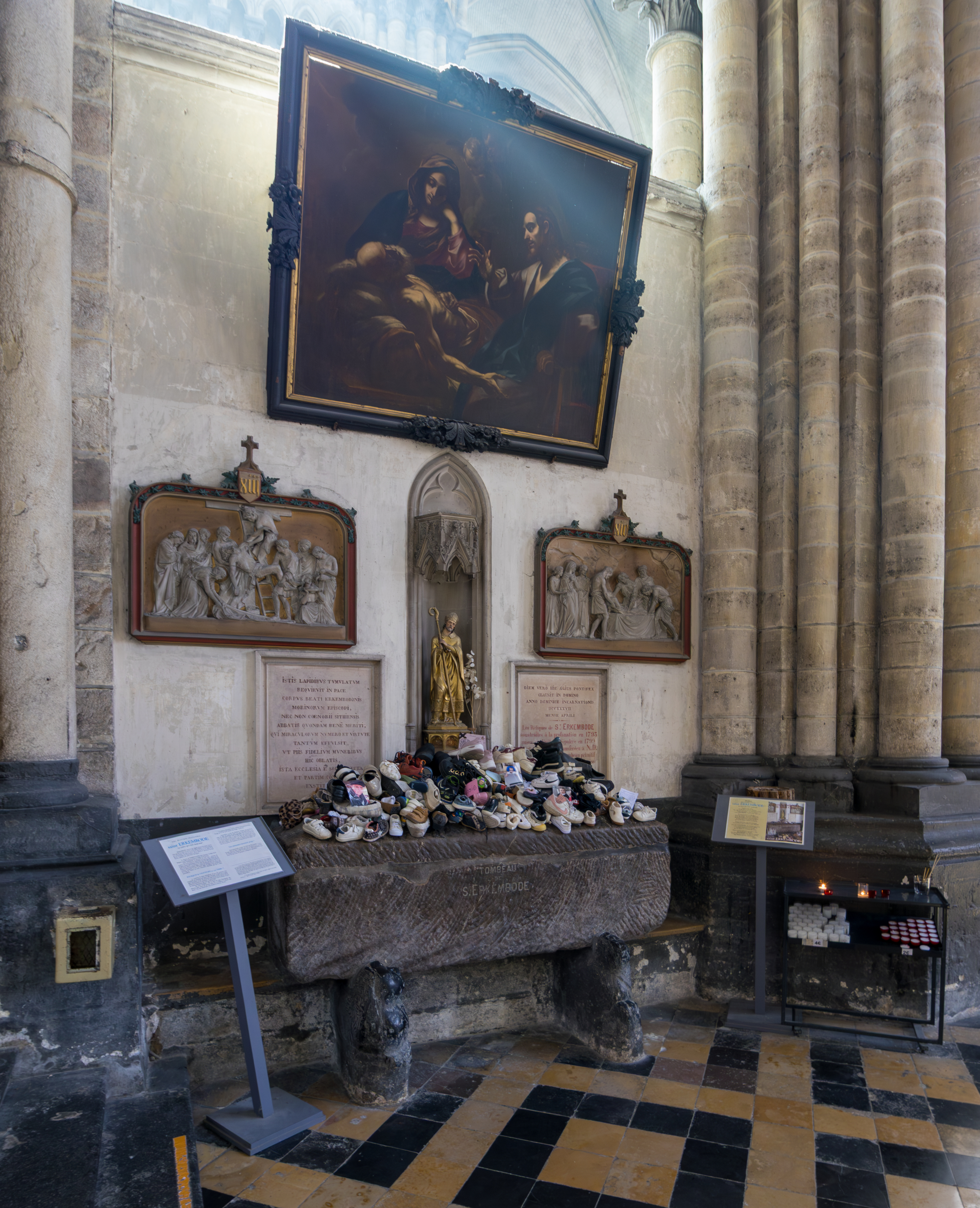
Sarcophagus of Saint Erkembode

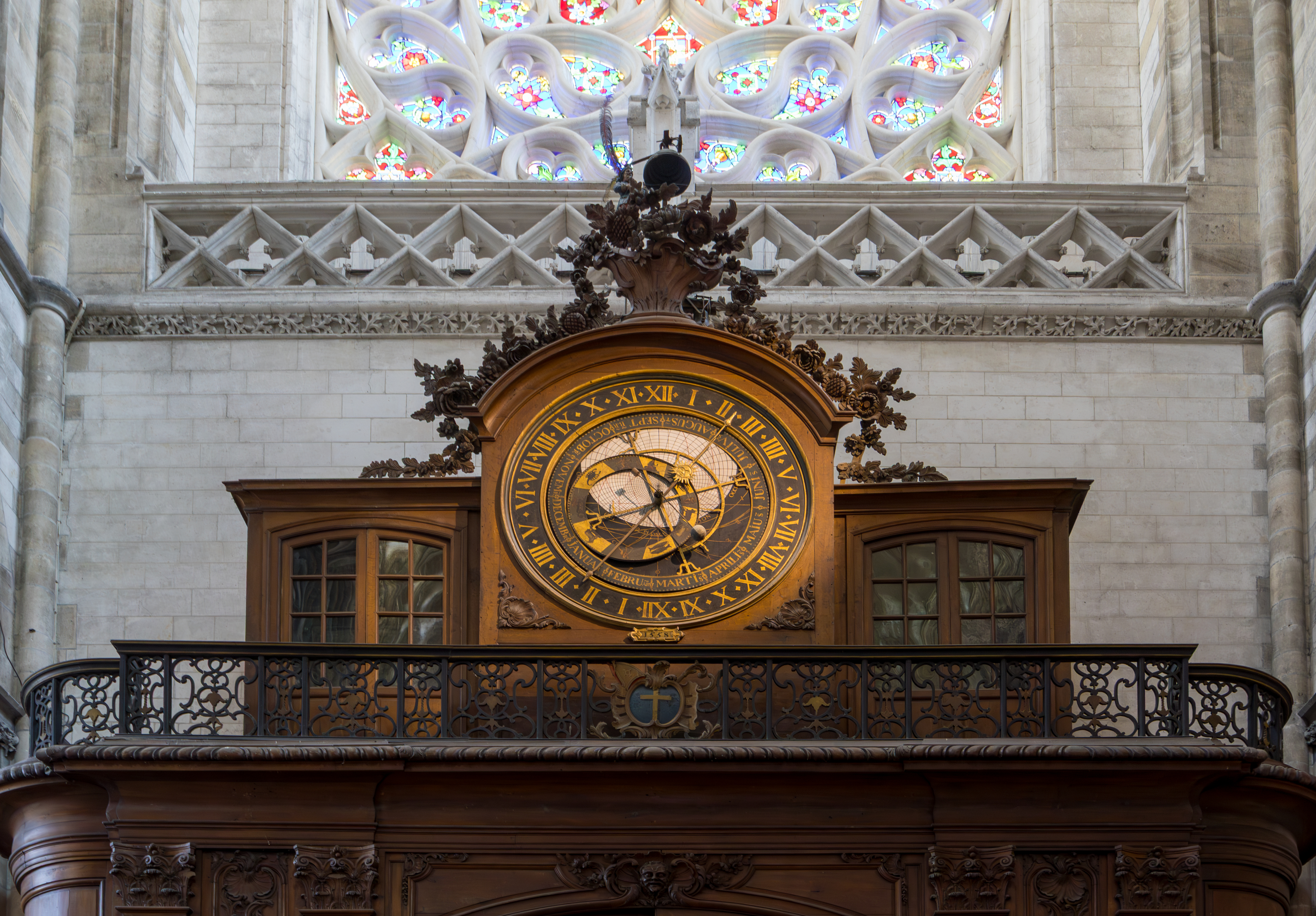
Astronomical clock

The gallery organ
