= Walloon Flanders =

Semi-independent part of the County of Flanders

Coat of arms of the counts of Flanders

Walloon Flanders (Dutch: Waals Vlaanderen, French: Flandre wallonne) was a semi-independent part of the County of Flanders, composed of the burgraviates of Lille, Douai and Orchies. It is sometimes referred to as Lille–Douai–Orchies. The population of the region speak Picardy dialects.

== History ==
The term "Walloon Flanders" appeared after the French conquest and was fixed in the literature by the beginning of the 19th century.

Walloon Flanders was part of the County of Flanders from the early Middle Ages. It was ceded to the Kingdom of France (cession distinct from the French fief status of the County of Flanders itself) from 1304 to 1369, by the Treaty of Athis-sur-Orge which concluded the Franco-Flemish War (1297-1305). As a result, it remained to some degree institutionally distinct from the rest of the County of Flanders in subsequent years, and in some lists it even features as one of the Seventeen Provinces. Furthermore, Walloon Flanders adhered to the Union of Arras in 1579, whereas the County of Flanders joined the Union of Utrecht.

In 1678, Walloon Flanders was annexed to France after the Treaties of Nijmegen.

Together with Maritime Flanders (Westhoek), it forms French Flanders, and is today the part of the Departement du Nord roughly corresponding with the Arrondissement of Lille and the Arrondissement of Douai.

== See also ==
- Romance Flanders
