= Petrus Simons =

Belgian theologian and Roman Catholic bishop

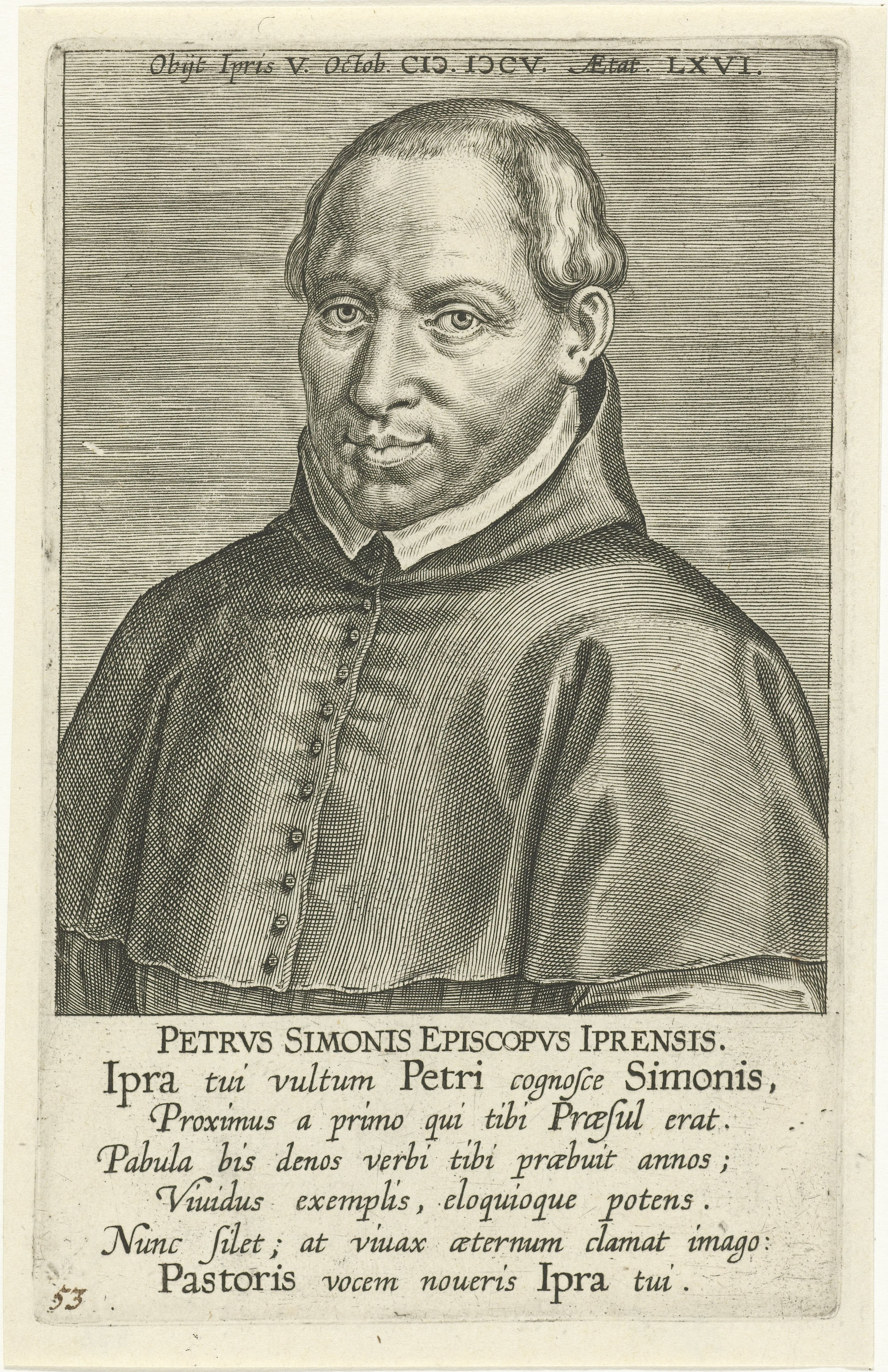
Petrus Simons

Pierre Simons (1538—1605) was a theologian and the second bishop of Ypres.

== Life ==
Simons was born at Tielt in 1538, to a farming couple, Etienne Simoens and Marie van Slambrouck. Orphaned young, Pierre was educated at the Bogard school in Bruges, where he showed such promise that the governors decided to send him to Leuven University for further studies. On 20 March 1559 he graduated from the Faculty of Arts as second of his year among 154 students, and received a scholarship to go on to a Theology degree, studying at Holy Spirit College. He graduated Bachelor of Theology in 1563, and was ordained priest on 18 September of the same year by Petrus Curtius, bishop of Bruges.

In 1567 he graduated Licentiate in Theology, and the following year was appointed to a prebend in the chapter of Bruges Cathedral. At Holy Ghost College, Simons had been taught by Cornelis Jansenius, who as bishop of Ghent appointed him canon penitentiary in 1569, and archpriest in 1570. Simons worked in tandem with Clemens Crabbeels, archdeacon and diocesan official, who would later become bishop of 's-Hertogenbosch.

In 1570 Simons accompanied Jansenius to the provincial synod in Mechelen, at the closing of which he delivered an oration on obedience to canon law. In 1571 he delivered the inaugural address to the diocesan synod of Ghent. As archpriest he visited Oudenaarde after it had been recovered from rebel forces and reported on the atrocities committed against the clergy in the town. His report was turned into verse by the soldier-poet Jacobus Yetzweirtius. Copies were published in 1841 in Recueil de Chroniques, Chartes et autres Documents concernant l'Histoire et les Antiquités de la Flandre, and in 1870, in volume 8 of Analectes pour servir à l'histoire ecclésiastique de Belgique. In 1576 he delivered the funeral oration for Jansenius.

In 1577 the rebels took control of Ghent, and in September the following year Catholic worship was proscribed in the city. In October the city government banished Simons, who went into exile first in Douai and later in Kortrijk, where his friend Joannes David was a parish priest. After David had joined the Jesuits in 1582, Simons took over his pastoral duties. In September 1584, a fortnight before Ghent returned to royal control, Pope Gregory XIII confirmed the nomination of Simons to the diocese of Ypres and of Crabbeels to 's-Hertogenbosch. The two were consecrated in Tournai on 13 January 1585. He was enthroned in his see on 27 January.

Simons was diligent in visiting his war-torn diocese, reforming clerical and monastic discipline, and preaching frequently. He restored the cathedral, commissioning new choir stalls from Urbain Taillebert and a monumental crucifix from Orner van Ommen. He also had a new high altar and tabernacle installed. He provided refuges in Ypres for several religious communities from the Flemish countryside, until 1601 subject to raids by the Dutch garrison in Ostend, and in 1594 provided a new home for the Poor Clares of Middelburg.

In his first year as bishop he revived the annual procession in early August commemorating the Siege of Ypres (1383), which had been suppressed in 1578, and instituted a new annual procession in April to commemorate the city's reconciliation.

He was particularly concerned with education, encouraging the re-establishment of parish schools and Sunday schools, and in 1586 refounding the diocesan seminary established by his predecessor, Martin Rythovius. He provided the Jesuits with a house in Ypres in return for them providing two teachers to the seminary, and converted one of the prebends of his cathedral chapter into a position for a graduate in Theology who would teach Sacred Scripture.

Simons died in Ypres on 5 October 1605. He was buried in his cathedral. He left bequests to the cathedral, to the Faculty of Theology in Leuven, to Groeninghe Abbey in Kortrijk, to the Bogard school in Bruges, and to his sister, with the diocesan seminary as residual legatee. After his death his writings and surviving sermons were edited for publication by his friend Joannes David. The resulting 654-page volume was printed in Antwerp in 1609 by Jan Moretus, under the title Petri Simonis Tiletani Episcopi Yprensis De veritate libri sex, et reliqua eius, quae supersunt, multae eruditionis & pietatis opera.

Catholic Church titles
Preceded by Martin Rythovius	Bishop of Ypres; 1584–1605	Succeeded by Carolus Maes
