= Martin Rythovius =

Dutch Catholic theologian and bishop

The Right Reverend Martin Rythovius
- Bishop of Ypres
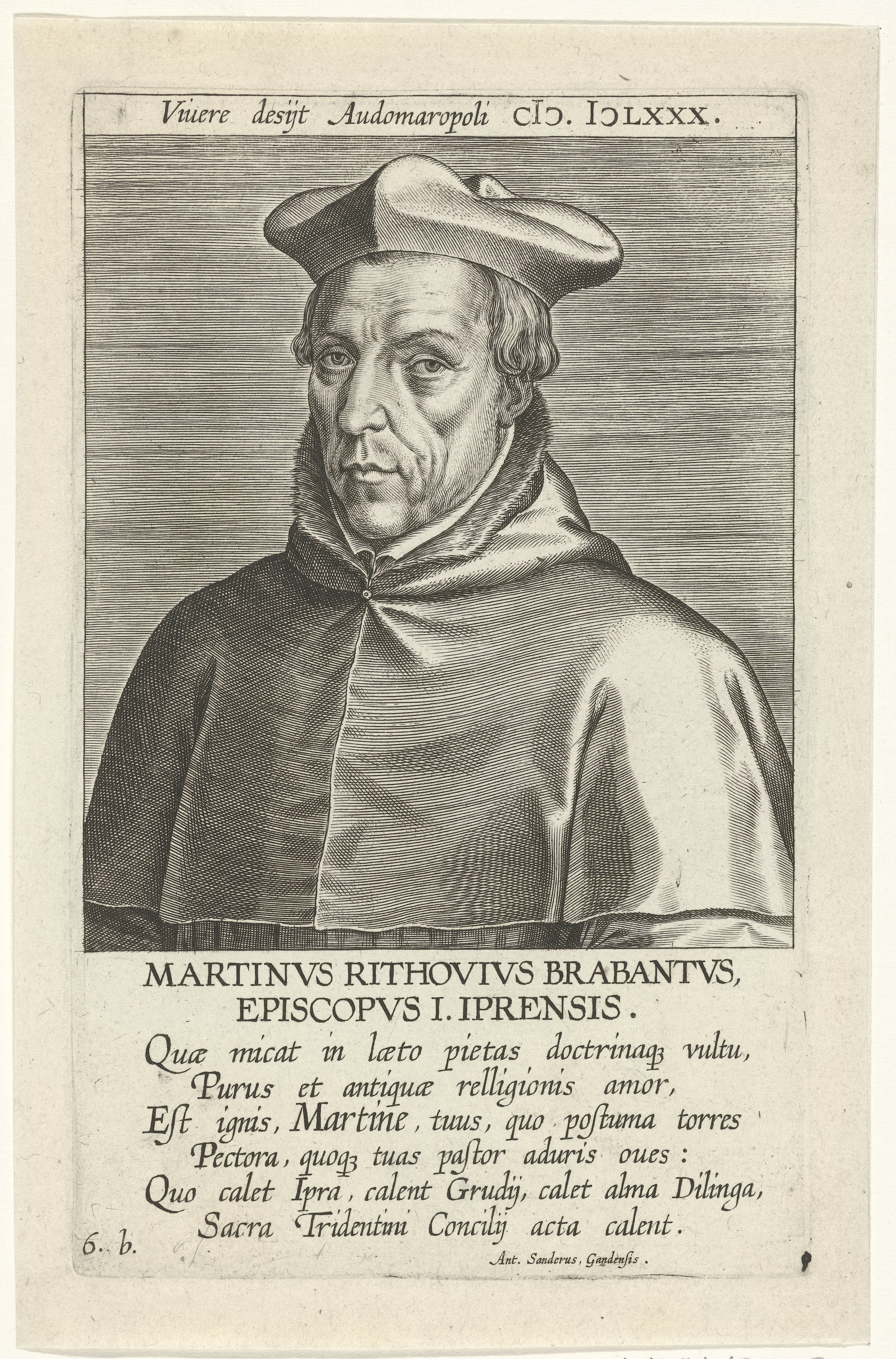
- Martin Bauwens of Riethoven
- Church: Roman Catholic
- Diocese: Ypres
- Appointed: 10 March 1561
- Term ended: 9 October 1583
- Predecessor: diocese established
- Successor: Petrus Simons

Orders
- Consecration: 1 November 1562 by Antoine Perrenot de Granvelle

Personal details
- Born: 1511 Riethoven, Duchy of Brabant
- Died: 9 October 1583 (aged c. 71/72) Riethoven, France
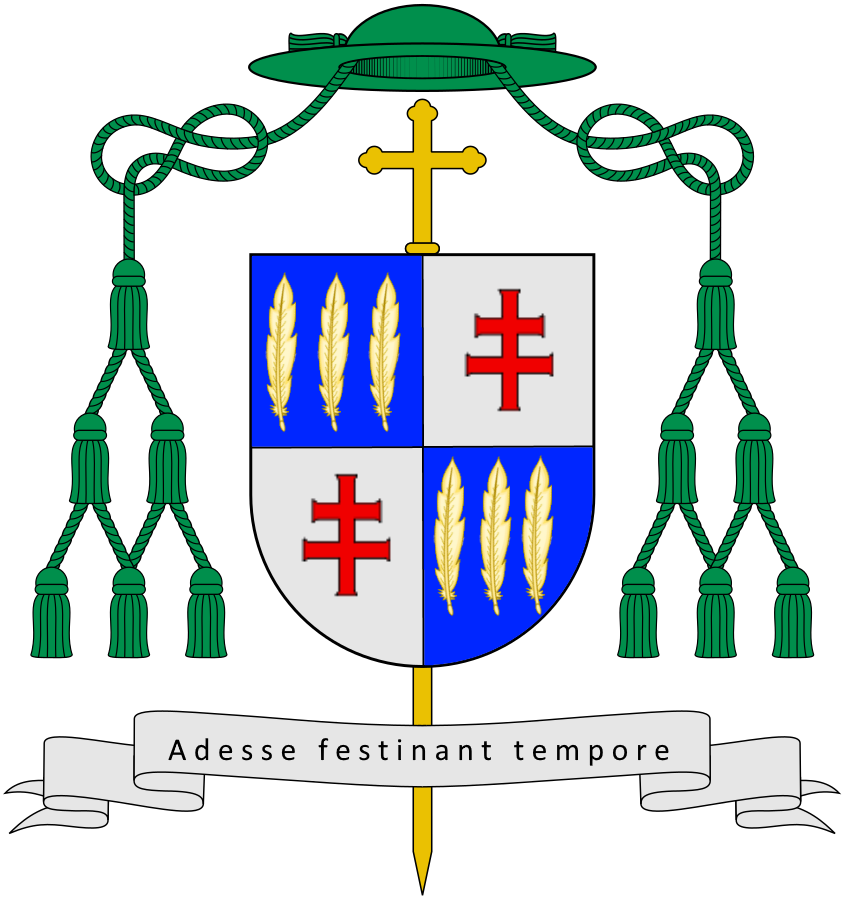
- Coat of arms

Martin Bauwens of Riethoven or Martinus Rythovius (1511 – 9 October 1583) was a Catholic theologian and the first Bishop of Ypres. He was a figure of some spiritual and political significance during the early decades of the Dutch Revolt.

== Life ==
Rythovius was born in 1511 to Baldwin and Lutgard Bauwens at Riethoven in the Duchy of Brabant (now in the Netherlands). He graduated from Leuven University as a Master of Arts in 1533, as a student of Falcon College, coming second of his year among 107 students. From 1535 to 1545 he taught Philosophy at Falcon College, joining the council of the Faculty of Arts on 5 January 1537. In 1550 he graduated Licentiate of Sacred Theology. In 1549 Cardinal Otto Truchsess von Waldburg, prince-bishop of Augsburg, recruited him as a professor for the University of Dillingen that he was in the process of establishing, but Rythovius returned to the Low Countries in 1552 due to the war between Maurice of Saxony and Emperor Charles V.

=== Professor of Theology ===
On 19 May 1556 Rythovius graduated Doctor of Sacred Theology in Leuven. He went on to be appointed president of Holy Ghost College, professor in the Faculty of Theology, and a canon of St. Peter's Church, Leuven. In 1557 he was deputed by the Faculty to the Colloquy of Worms. On 7 March 1559 he resigned the presidency of Holy Ghost College in favour of Jean Hessels and on 22 September succeeded Michel Drieux as dean of St Peter's and vice-chancellor of the university.

=== Bishop of Ypres ===
With the establishment of new bishoprics in the Low Countries in 1559, Philip II of Spain nominated Rythovius to the see of Ypres. Pope Pius IV confirmed the nomination on 10 March 1561. On 2 November 1561 Rythovius was consecrated bishop by Antoine Perrenot de Granvelle in Brussels Minster. He was installed in his see, St Martin's Cathedral, Ypres, on 11 November, the feast of St Martin.

On 26 April 1563 Rythovius departed Ypres to join the Low Countries delegation to the final sessions of the Council of Trent, also called the Tridentine Council. He arrived on 21 June the same year, taking part in sessions 23 (on seminaries), 24 (on marriage), and 25 (on purgatory, saints and indulgences). In the session on marriage he was one of the most outspoken opponents of the proposal to make parental consent a necessary precondition for a valid marriage. He returned to Ypres on 7 February 1564. From 1564 until 1577 he held a diocesan synod annually on the Tuesday after Pentecost. In 1565 he opened the diocesan seminary in Ypres, the first to be founded in accordance with the Tridentine decrees. On 8 July 1566 the cathedral canons agreed to adopt the new Tridentine liturgy.

In 1565 Rythovius was appointed to a committee of jurists, pastors and theologians that met in Brussels to discuss the laws on heresy. The committee reported on 8 June 1565 advising that the laws on heresy should not change, but that a secret instruction be sent to the tribunals asking them to moderate punishment in accordance with the social position, sex and age of the accused, giving them leeway to sentence those convicted to hard labour, banishment or even a fine rather than to death. Only preachers of heresy should be subject to the full rigour of the law. The report was despatched to Philip II on 22 July. In October, Philip responded with the Letters from the Segovia Woods, rejecting any moderation of the laws on heresy.

Further negotiations led to a debate in the States of Flanders, in session at Bruges on 16 May 1566. At Bruges, Rythovius argued that in the interest of the public peace, King Philip should be asked to soften and mitigate the laws on heresy. On 10 August the Iconoclastic Fury broke out in the diocese of Ypres, reaching the city of Ypres on 16 August. The cathedral was sacked and Rythovius's library went up in flames. The bishop went into hiding, until placed under public protection on 19 August. Catholic worship was restored to the cathedral on 29 August. Over the subsequent months, outlaws targeted the clergy of the diocese, with the parish priests of Houtkerque, Reningelst, Hondschoote, Rexpoëde, Rubrouck and Herzeele murdered, and others mutilated or mistreated

The Duke of Alva summoned Rythovius to Brussels for 4 June 1568, where he was informed that Lamoral, Count of Egmont, had been condemned to death. The bishop pleaded for the count's life to no avail, and afterwards heard the condemned man's last confession and the next morning administered the viaticum and accompanied him to the scaffold for a final blessing. Rythovius then travelled to Leuven, where he informed Cunerus Petri, rector of the university, of what had transpired. Cuneri informed Thomas Stapleton, who wrote a letter to a professor at Douai with the full details. Rythovius returned to Brussels on 9 June and wrote to Philip II regarding Count Egmont's final protestations of loyalty. Philip's favour to Lamoral's heir, Philip, Count of Egmont, has been attributed at least in part to this intercession.

On 29 September 1571, Rythovius wrote a private letter to the Duke of Alva urging him to seek an alternative to the Tenth Penny. The States of Flanders, having failed to dissuade the duke, asked the bishops of Ypres, Bruges and Ghent to petition him on their behalf. They did so on 12 January 1572, to no avail. On 24 March they wrote directly to the king to protest the new tax, which was suspended by royal order of 26 June, five days after the king had received the Flemish delegates.

In the session of the States of Flanders on 16 September 1576 the clergy, led by Rythovius, insisted upon the maintenance of the Catholic Faith. The Pacification of Ghent of 8 November 1576 stipulated that the Catholic Faith would be maintained throughout the Low Countries with the exception of Holland and Zeeland, with a provisional suspension of the heresy laws. Rythovius and Jean Vendeville travelled to Luxembourg to appeal to John of Austria to accept the Pacification of Ghent, which he did on 8 December. Rythovius was one of the signatories of the Union of Brussels on 9 January 1577.

=== Imprisonment and death ===
In October 1577 the bishop of Ypres attended the session of the States of Flanders in Ghent. In the night of 28–29 October there was a coup in which Philippe III de Croÿ, Rythovius, and the bishop of Bruges, Remi Drieux, were taken prisoner. Aarschot was released on 10 November, but the bishops, and a number of other leading opponents of the Revolt, remained in captivity, essentially hostages, until 14 August 1581. The continued imprisonment of the bishops of Ypres and Bruges was one of the complaints underlying the Union of Arras breaking with the revolt in December 1578. Rythovius was unable to return to Ypres, which remained in rebel hands until 7 April 1584, but did what he could in the towns of his diocese that had been reconquered by Alexander Farnese, such as Dunkirk and Veurne.

He died at Saint-Omer on 9 October 1583. On 11 November 1607 his mortal remains were transported to Ypres and laid to rest in a mausoleum sculpted by Urbain Taillebert.

== Publications ==
- Statuta synodi dioecesanae Yprensis, celebratae feria tertia ante Pentecosten, vigesima prima May, anno Millesimo quingentesimo, septuagesimo septimo (Ypres, 1577) – the statutes of the diocesan synod of 1577 (available on Google Books)

Catholic Church titles
Preceded by new creation	Bishop of Ypres; 1561–1583	Succeeded by Petrus Simons
