= Ravesteyn (disambiguation) =

Ravesteyn may refer to

== Locations ==
- Ravenstein, also spelled Ravesteyn, buitenplaats near Grijpskerke on Walcheren in Zeeland, the Netherlands

=== Buildings ===
- Ravesteyn Castle, castle in Heenvliet, South Holland, the Netherlands
- House architect Sybold Van Ravesteyn, Rijksmonument in Utrecht, the Netherlands

== Ships ==
- Ravesteyn, 18th-century East Indiaman of the Dutch East India Company (named after the buitenplaats)

== People named Ravesteyn or van Ravesteyn or von Ravensteyn ==
- Josse Ravesteyn, Flemish Roman Catholic theologian
- Jan van Ravesteyn, Dutch Golden Age portrait painter
- Anthonie van Ravesteyn, Dutch Golden Age portrait painter, brother of the former
- Arnold van Ravesteyn, Dutch Golden Age portrait painter, son of the former
- Hubert van Ravesteyn, Dutch Golden Age painter
- Nicolaes van Ravesteyn, 18th century painter from the Northern Netherlands
- Sybold van Ravesteyn (1889-1983), Dutch architect
- Willem van Ravesteyn (1876-1970), Dutch Communist politician and historian
- Dirck de Quade van Ravesteyn (1565–1620), Dutch Golden Age painter
- Josse Ravesteyn, also spelled Ravestein (ca. 1506–1570), Flemish Roman Catholic theologian
- Paulus Aertsz van Ravesteyn (c. 1586–1655), Dutch printer
- Mea van Ravesteyn-Kramer (born 1947), Dutch politician (D66)
- Philipp Honorius von Ravensteyn (1655-1729), Dutch architect

== See also ==
- Ravenstein
