= Herincx =

Herincx is a surname. Notable people with the surname include:

- Guillaume Herincx (1621–1678), Belgian Franciscan theologian and bishop of Ypres
- Raimund Herincx (1927–2018), British operatic bass baritone
