= Joannes David =

Joannes David (1545–1613) was a Flemish Jesuit priest and a prolific author of controversial, apologetic and devotional books and pamphlets. He sometimes published under pen names or aliases, including anagrams such as Divoda Jansen.

== Life ==
Joannes David was born in Kortrijk on 13 September 1546 and studied theology at Leuven University under Cornelius Jansen. In 1568 he accompanied Jansen to Ghent, where he had been appointed bishop, presumably as his secretary. Jansen ordained him to the priesthood at Oudenaarde on 23 September 1570. In the 1570s he served as a parish priest and rector of the Latin school in his native Kortrijk. He resigned in 1581 to enter the Society of Jesus. In 1587 he established the Jesuit college in Kortrijk as its first rector. In 1596 he transferred to Brussels, as rector of the Jesuit college there. The earliest works that can be ascribed to him with certainty date from this period. In 1598 or 1599 he was transferred to Ghent, where he was active until 1602. Thereafter he may again have served as rector of the college in Kortrijk. His writings indicate that he was in Ypres in 1605 and 1607. While many of his works were intended for a popular readership, four works in Latin were produced in high quality at the Plantin Press, with illustrations by Theodoor Galle. David died in Antwerp on 9 August 1613.

== Writings ==
- Kettersche Spinnecoppe (Brussels, Rutger Velpius, 1596)
  - Latin translation as Haereticus araneus (Cologne, Joannes Kinckius, 1609)
- Christelijcken bie-corf der H. Roomscher Kercke (Antwerp, Martinus Nutius, 1600)
- Domp-hooren der Hollanscher fackel (Landuit, Colophon van Bacharach, 1602) – the publisher's name and address are fictional
- Den Christelycken Waerseggher (Antwerp, Plantin Press, 1603).
- Den Doolhof der Ketteren (Antwerp, Joachim Trognaesius, 1605)
- Occasio arrepta neglecta (Antwerp, Plantin Press, 1605)
- Bonaes Idinau, Lot van wijsheyd ende goed geluck (Antwerp, Plantin Press, 1606)
- Dompe-trompe op het niewe register (Lovendeghem, Boose'mondt Goe-maere, 1606) – the publisher's name and address are fictional
- Toets-steen tot beproevinghe (Antwerp, Martinus Nutius, 1607)
  - Latin translation as Lapis Lydius (Cologne, 1610)
- Bloem-hof der Kerckelicker Cerimonien (Antwerp, Joachim Trognaesius, 1607)
- Paradisus Sponsi et Sponsae (Antwerp, Plantin Press, 1607)
- Vry-gheleyde tot ontlastinghe van conscientie (Antwerp, Joachim Trognaesius, 1609)
- Petrus Simons, De veritate libri sex, et reliqua eius, quae supersunt, multae eruditionis & pietatis opera (Antwerp, Plantin Press, 1609), edited for posthumous publication by David.
- De Ketterschen Vleeschpot der Smoorender onkuyscheydt (Antwerp, Joachim Trognaesius, 1610)
- Duodecim specula (Antwerp, Plantin Press, 1610)
- Locht-gat voor den driftigen moet, ende puffende wijsheit der nieuwe Schrift-ghesinde (Ypres, François Bellet, 1610)
- Postillon van den Roskam der vermomder Eselinne van Willem Teelinck (Antwerp, 1611)
- Historie van de Kettersche Kercke ghenaemt de Fuyle bruydt (Uranopoli, Huys der Waerheyt, 1611) – the publisher's name and address are fictional
- Nieuwe Tijdinge van den Duyvel ende dry notabele persoonen (Hadopoli, Poniroponus, 1611) – the publisher's name and address are fictional
- Pedro de Ribadeneira, Het Leven van S. P. Ignatius van Loyola, stichter der Societeyt Jesu, translated from Spanish to Dutch by David (Ypres, François Bellet, 1611),
- Amputandumputabamradix (Antwerp, Joachim Trognaesius, 1612)
