= George Chamberlain (bishop) =

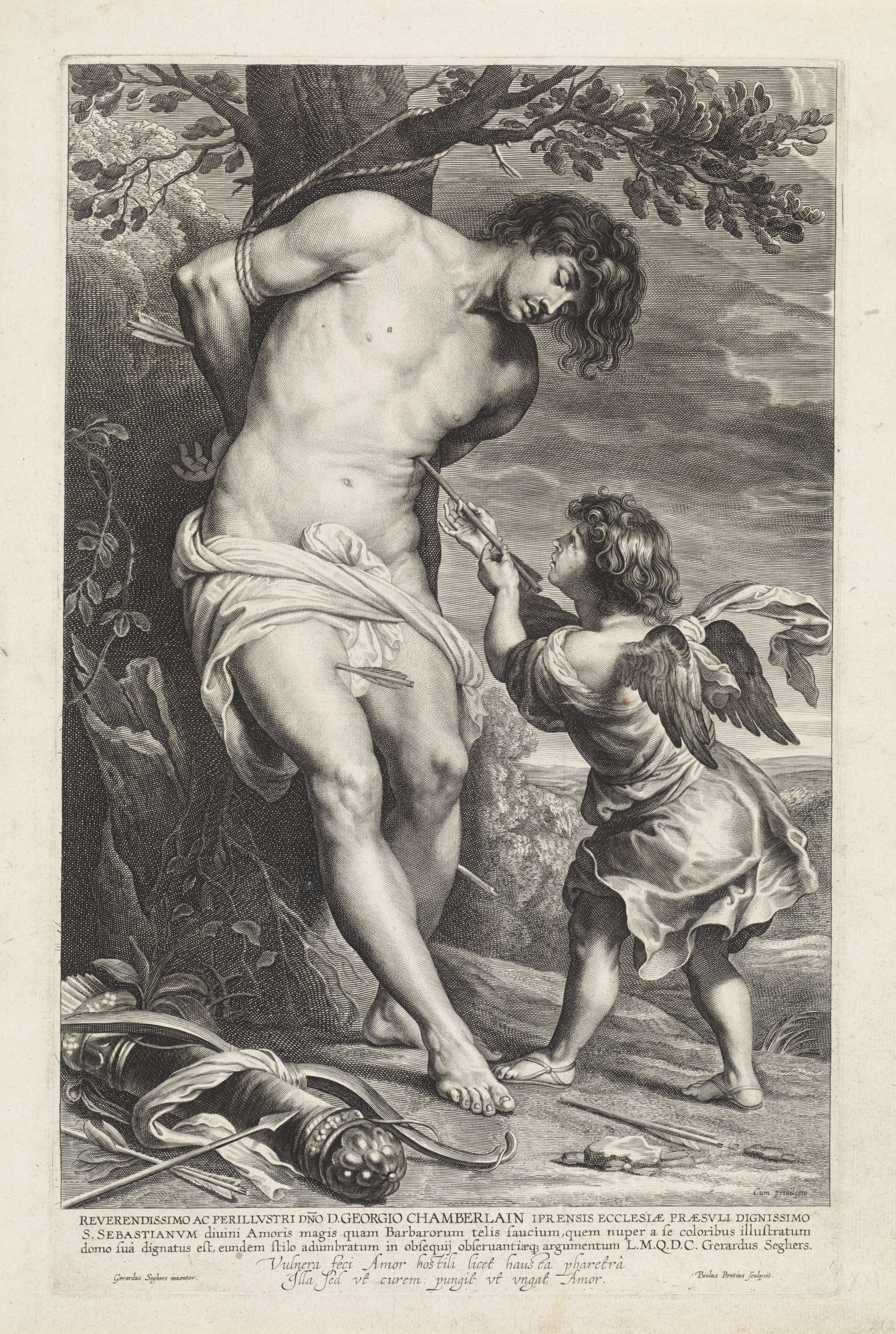
- A print dedicated to George Chamberlain: Paulus Pontius, St Sebastian, after Gerard Seghers (c. 1630)
- Diocese: Ypres
- See: St Martin's
- Appointed: 1626
- In office: 1626–1634
- Predecessor: Antoine de Hennin
- Successor: Cornelius Jansen
- Previous post: Dean of St Bavo's Cathedral, Ghent

Orders
- Ordination: 1600
- Consecration: 5 November 1628

Personal details
- Born: 1576 Ghent, County of Flanders, Habsburg Netherlands
- Died: 1634 (aged 57–58) Ypres, County of Flanders, Spanish Netherlands
- Buried: St Martin's Cathedral, Ypres
- Parents: George Chamberlain and Philippine L'Espinoy
- Education: canon law
- Motto: In solitudine solatium ("Solace in solitude")

George Chamberlain or Chamberlayne (1576–1634) was an Englishman who became the sixth bishop of Ypres.

== Life ==
Chamberlain was the second son of George Chamberlain and Philippine L'Espinoy, and grandson of Sir Leonard Chamberlain. He was born at Ghent, and grew up in Saint-Omer, where his father, a Catholic exile from England, had settled. He studied at the English College, Rome, and was ordained priest in the Lateran Basilica.

He returned to the Low Countries to serve in the household of the papal nuncio, Ottavio Mirto Frangipani, and went on to become canon, archdeacon, and dean of St Bavo's Cathedral, Ghent. After the death of Antoine de Hennin in December 1626, was appointed to the bishopric of Ypres. Around that period members of his English family resided at Shirburn in Oxfordshire. The estates having fallen to an heiress, Chamberlain, the next heir male, came to England, not so much to put up his claim as to resign it, in order to confirm the title of the heiress to Shirburn Castle. He was consecrated bishop of Ypres only on 5 November 1628. On 16 June 1630 he assisted at the consecration of Servaas de Quinckere as bishop of Bruges.

As bishop he sat in the States of Flanders as a representative of the First Estate, and in the Estates General of 1632. He died in Ypres on 19 December 1634. He composed some poems and religious pieces in Latin.

== Notes ==
Attribution

- This article incorporates text from a publication now in the public domain: Stephen, Leslie, ed. (1887). "Chamberlain, George". Dictionary of National Biography. Vol. 10. London: Smith, Elder & Co.
