= Ravenstein =

Ravenstein may refer to:

== Places ==
- Ravenstein, Germany in the district Neckar-Odenwald, Baden-Württemberg
- Ravenstein, Netherlands in Oss, North Brabant
- Ravenstein railway station

== People with the surname ==
- Adolph of Cleves, Lord of Ravenstein (1425–1492), noble from the Low Countries
- Philip of Cleves, Lord of Ravenstein (1459–1528), his son and successor
- Johann von Ravenstein, Lieutenant in World War I and Lieutenant general in the Wehrmacht during World War II
- Ernst Georg Ravenstein (a.k.a. Ernest George Ravenstein), Anglo-German geographer and athletics promoter
- Josse Ravesteyn, also spelled Ravestein (ca. 1506–1570), Flemish Roman Catholic theologian

== See also ==
- Ravesteyn (disambiguation)
