= Ruard Tapper =

Dutch theologian

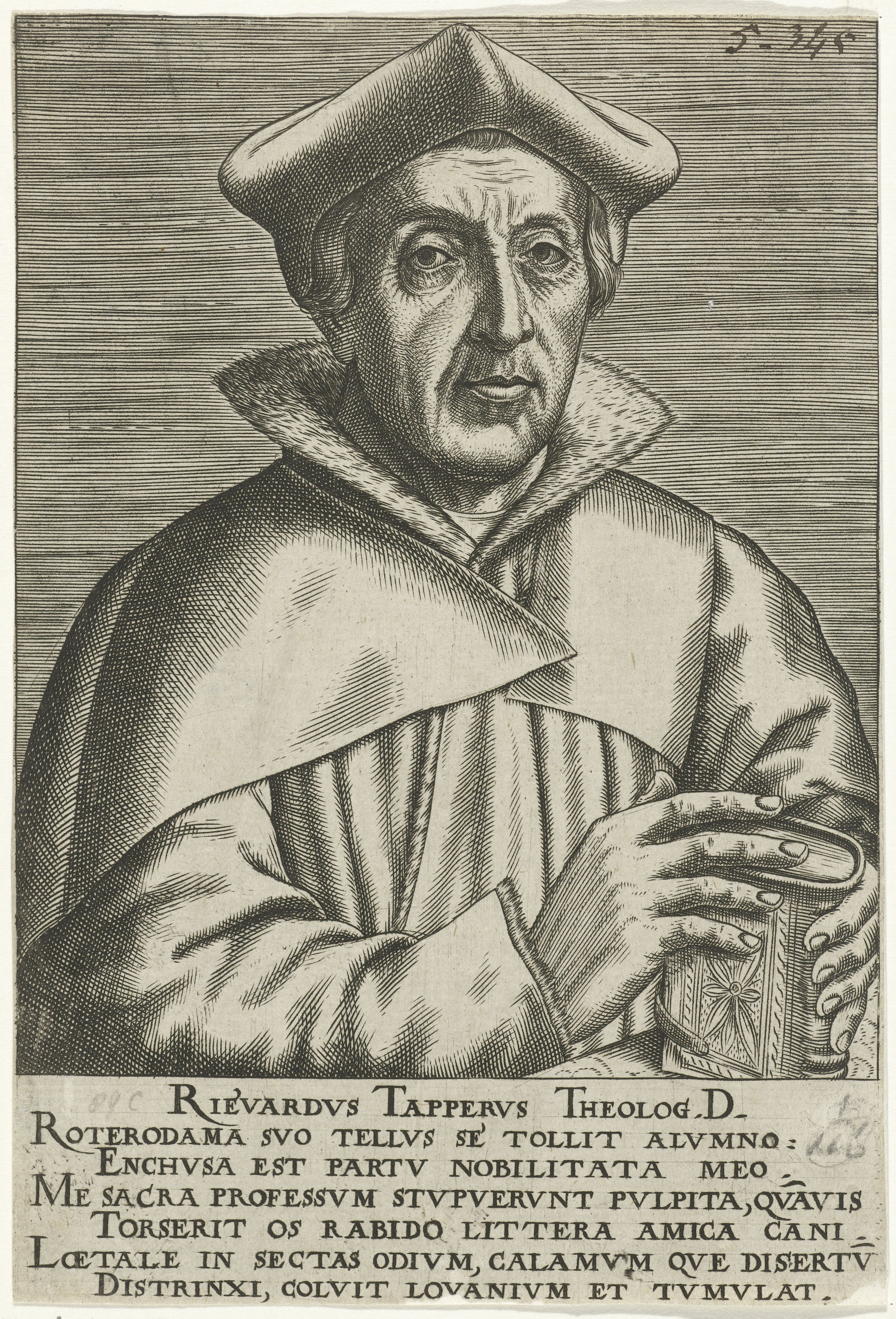
Portrait of Ruard Tapper engraved by Philip Galle (1572)

Ruard Tapper (15 February 1487 – 2 March 1559) was a Dutch theologian of the Catholic Reformation, a chancellor of Leuven University, and an inquisitor.

== Life ==
Tapper was born at Enkhuizen, County of Holland, on 15 February 1487. He matriculated at Leuven University on 11 June 1503, and graduated M.A. in 1507, placing second highest in his year. While studying Theology he taught physics and logic, and in 1511 sat on the university council on behalf of the Faculty of Arts. In 1517 he served as dean of the Faculty of Arts. He was ordained to the priesthood in 1515, and graduated Licentiate of Sacred Theology on 3 June 1516 and Doctor of Sacred Theology on 16 August 1519. On 7 November 1519 he was involved in the Faculty of Theology's condemnation of a number of propositions drawn from the writings of Martin Luther.

On 21 November 1519 Tapper succeeded Martinus Dorpius as president of Holy Spirit College in Leuven, serving in that capacity until October 1533. The extensive renovations he had carried out on the college led to him being regarded as its second founder. From June 1523 to September 1525 he was involved in several heresy trials as a theological adviser to Inquisitor Franciscus Van der Hulst, including those of Jan van Essen and Hendrik Vos, Wilhelm Gnapheus and Cornelis Hoen, and Jan de Bakker. According to Gnapheus, Tapper made every possible effort to save Bakker but was unable to sway him from his opinions.

After Godescalc Rosemont's death in 1526, Tapper succeeded him as professor of theology and as a canon of St. Peter's Church, Leuven. In 1535 he succeeded Nicolas Coppin as dean of St. Peter's and chancellor of the university.

On 6 July 1537, Pope Paul III appointed Tapper and Michael Drieux jointly as Inquisitors General of the Low Countries. Tapper was singled out for criticism as a merciless persecutor in Protestant texts, with one early history of the Reformation attributing to him the view that "It is no great matter whether those that die on this account be guilty or innocent, provided we terrify the people by these examples". In fact, Tapper was often more lenient than the letter of the law required, imposing public penances where the decrees of Charles V called for the death penalty, and insisting that spiritual ills required spiritual remedies. In 1544, the emperor asked the pope to intervene to instruct Tapper and Drieux to apply the imperial proclamations in full force, and insist that those who had been guilty of spreading or defending heretical opinions be relinquished to secular tribunals for punishment. Only after that did he issue letters patent recognising their appointment. In 1553, at the request of Mary of Hungary, Pope Paul IV authorised Tapper and Drieux to delegate their powers.

Tapper drew up a list of 32 articles of faith that were included in the matriculation oath of Leuven University, and by an imperial decree of 24 October 1545 became the touchstone of orthodoxy under the law. Pope Pius IV gave his approbation to this confession of faith in 1561. Notes from Tapper's lectures explaining the doctrinal basis of the first 24 of these articles were published in Lyon in 1554 under the title Declaratio Articulorum, in response to which Tapper himself brought out a volume entitled Explicationis Articulorum in 1555, dedicated to Philip II, who had just married Mary I of England. The second volume included a letter of commendation from Philip dated Canterbury, 1 September 1556, in response to the first volume. The two volumes together covered only 20 of the 32 articles. The third volume was left uncompleted at the author's death.

Tapper opposed the development of Baianism at Leuven University, but when pressed to do so refused to initiate heresy proceedings against Michael Baius or Jean Hessels. Together with three other members of the university, Tapper took part in the second session of the Council of Trent, being present from September 1551 to April 1552. He returned to Leuven in September 1552, his journey delayed by the military and political situation in Germany. Even after his death, he continued to exercise an influence on the deliberations of the council's third session through his Explicationis Articulorum.

His collected works, edited for posthumous publication by the bishop of Roermond, William Damasus Lindanus, included a memorial to the emperor entitled Aureum Corrolarium arguing that the main cause of heresy was a failure of discipline and clear teaching within the Church, and a Refutatio quorumdam falsorum remediorum arguing that physical and capital punishment by secular authorities was not the most effective way to combat heretical opinions. Among his recommendations was the erection of new bishoprics in the Low Countries, a policy that came to fruition in the year that he died.

He died in Brussels on 2 March 1559 and was buried in St. Peter's church, Leuven.

== Works ==
- Methodus confessionis (Antwerp, Joannes Laet, 1553)
- Explicationis articulorum (2 vols., Leuven, 1555–1557)
- Opera omnia (2 vols., Cologne, Birckmann office, 1582)
