= Faculty of Theology, Old University of Leuven =

Old University

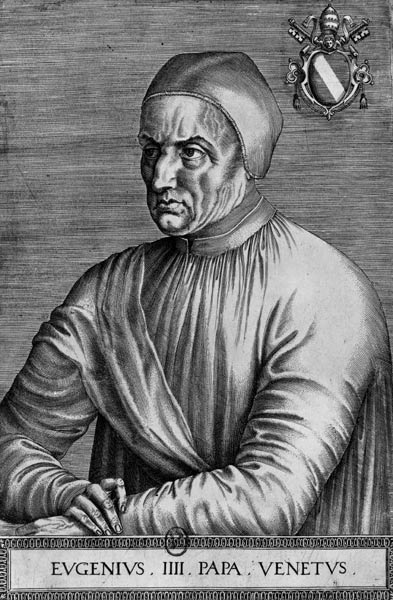
Pope Eugene IV who granted the University of Leuven permission to award theological degrees in 1432.

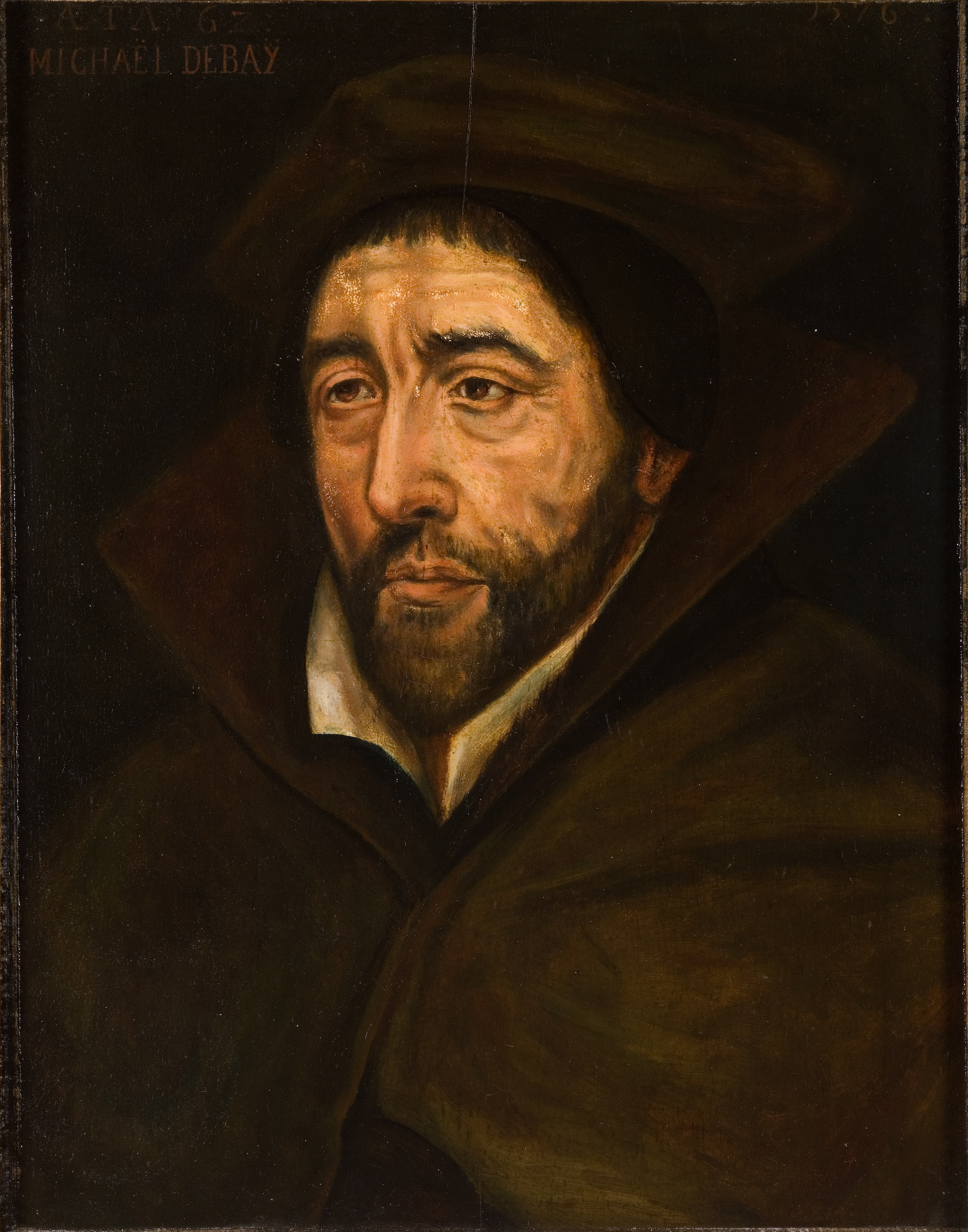
Michael Baius, professor of theology and rector.

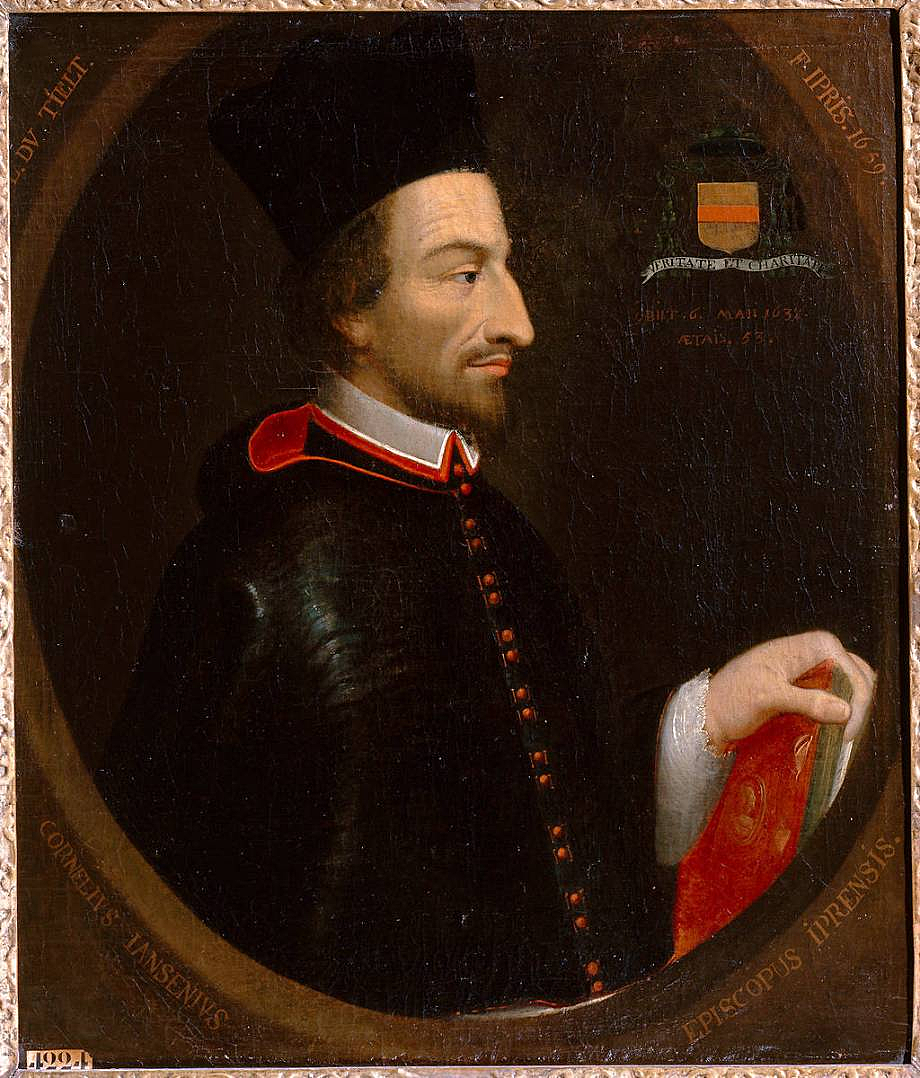
Cornelius Jansen, professor of theology and rector.

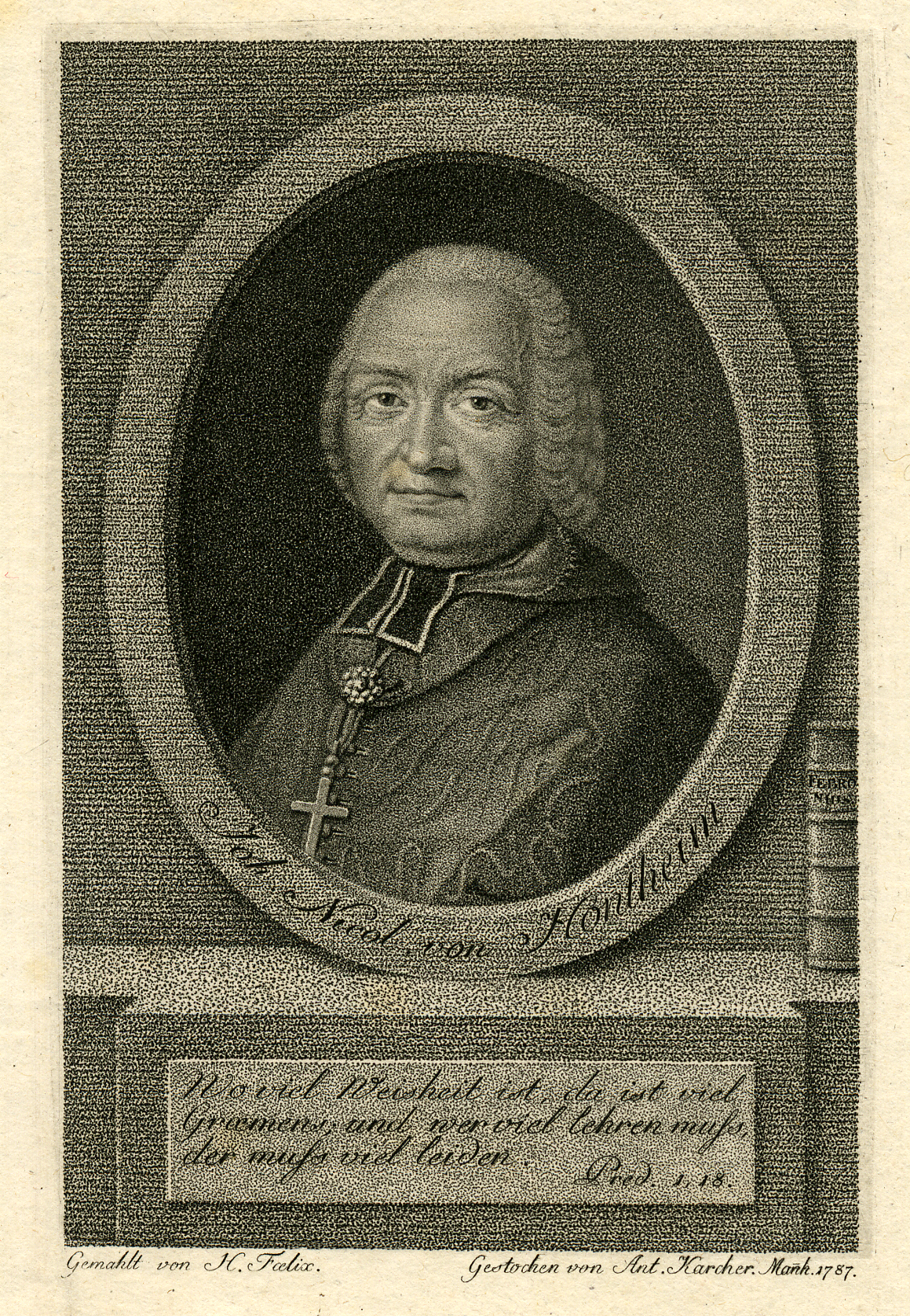
Febronius, former student at the Theological Faculty of Louvain.

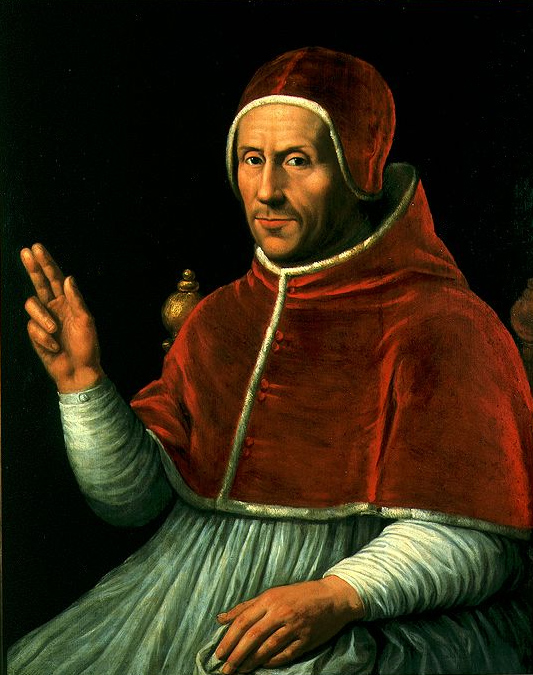
Pope Adrian VI, former professor of the university

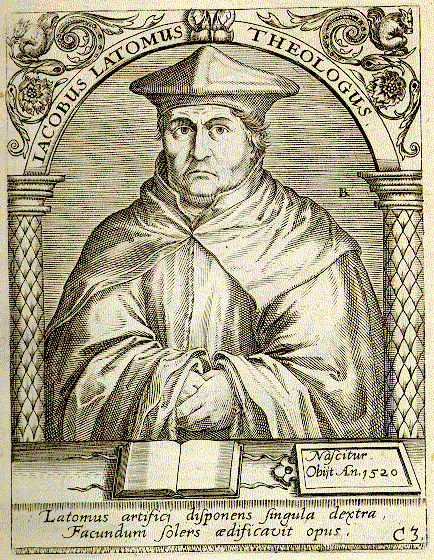
Jacobus Latomus

The Old University of Leuven was established in 1425 with Faculties of Arts, Medicine, Law; however, the university did not have a Faculty of Theology initially. In 1426 a Faculty of Canon Law was added, and at that time both Law Faculties functioned together in one Collegium utriusque iuris.

== History ==
During the Middle Ages, a studium generale was often rounded out after a short time with the foundation of a Faculty of Theology. After repeated requests from the municipal government, from the Duke of Brabant and from Philip the Good, the university received permission to grant theological degrees from Pope Eugene IV on 7 March 1432. Professors for the new faculty were first recruited from already existing theological faculties, particularly those of the University of Paris and the University of Cologne. Instruction in the old faculty of theology was thus closely based on the theological developments of these sister faculties. Students wishing to earn the degree of Sacrae Theologiae Licentiatus were taught and required to comment upon the Scriptures and Peter Lombard's Book of Sentences, and they took part in disputations that were a typical part of medieval university education. The most famous theologian from the 15th century faculty was Adrian Floriszoon of Utrecht. He taught in Leuven from 1491 to 1515 and later became Pope Adrian VI.

Throughout the sixteenth and seventeenth centuries Adrian's successors made a name for themselves by resourcing theology through a renewed study of Augustine. The Leuven Faculty and its magisters anticipated several of the theological trends that emerged in their time. An example of this is seen in Jacobus Latomus's De trium linguarum et studii theologici ratione dialogus, which was published in 1519 as a response to the challenge posed by the work of Desiderius Erasmus, who was active at the Collegium Trilingue in Leuven. Later theologians such as Johannes Driedo also strongly opposed Erasmian thought, saying it was a contemporary brand of Pelagianism. At the same time, the faculty also opposed Martin Luther's thought, by refuting his early writings in a censure published on 7 November 1519. Ruard Tapper, another Leuven theologian, led the controversy by drawing up a summary of the Catholic position in 59 articles, later reduced to 39 articles.

On top of this, Leuven's Theological Faculty also played an active role during the Council of Trent. Among the delegates to the council were several of its professors, including theologians like Tapper, Johannes Hesselius, and Michael Baius. In addition, Johannes Driedo's works were influential and circulated among the Tridentine Council Fathers.

In 1546 two Royal Chairs were granted to the faculty by Charles V, in addition to the five already existing chairs. One of these new chairs was dedicated to the study of Scripture. A characteristic of this period was the transition the Leuven faculty made from a scholastic theology to a more positive theology based on Scripture and the Church Fathers. A specific brand of Leuven Augustinianism developed in this context, and characterized the faculty and its theology throughout the eighteenth century, thus allowing the faculty to procure its own position within the Counter-Reformation. Here the faculty set the tone by publishing an Index of Forbidden Books (1546, reworked in 1550). This Index was the first of its kind and served as a model for the later Roman Index librorum prohibitorum published in 1559 by Pope Paul IV.

In 1547 the faculty published a new version of the Vulgate, which was submitted to better revisions. This new translation was used by the committee charged with preparing an official edition of the Vulgate in the seventeenth century under the authority of Pope Paul V. The faculty's growing scientific specialization was manifest in the publishing of two major works: the six language Biblia Polyglotta (1568–1572) and a new edition of the complete works of Augustine, supervised by Johannes Molanus (1576–1577) and published by Christoffel Plantijn (publisher of the Polyglot Bible, which is in exposition at the Plantijn-Moretus Museum in Antwerp).

The emphasis on Augustinus in theology took its most extreme form in Leuven in the teaching of Michael Baius. This theology focused on Augustine's thought regarding grace and creation, and it produced an extremely negative view of humanity in its fallen state. In this respect, Baius shared Reformation ideas, while flatly opposing the idea of sacramental restoration of humanity from this state. Baius' work was condemned by the theological faculties in Salamanca (1565) and Alcalá (1567), and 97 of his theses were thereafter condemned by Pope Pius V in the bull Ex omnibus afflictionibus on 1 October 1567. A new condemnation was given in 1580 by Pope Gregory XIII in his papal bull Provisionis Nostrae. Baius' work was also later contested by Jesuit theologians such as Leonardus Lessius and Robert Bellarmine. However, despite all of this opposition against Baianism, the Leuven professor regius became Inquisitor General. Later, in the twentieth century, theologians such as Henri de Lubac – in his famous book Surnaturel of 1946 – revived the discussion on the value of Baius' theological opinions.

Another famous exponent of Leuven Augustinianism was Cornelius Jansen, after whom Jansenism is named. After studying at the University of Utrecht and Leuven, Jansenius withdrew to France, where he applied himself to an intensive study of the Scriptures and the Church Fathers. He worked together with his friend Jean Duvergier de Hauranne who later became the abbé of Saint-Cyran. Jansenius studied the original sources rather than concentrating upon scholastic subtleties in a debate over the ground and efficacy of grace precisely as Pope Clement VIII had demanded. Jansenius' study of Augustine of Hippo's thought cost many years of work as is reflected in his book Augustinus, which was published posthumously in 1640. Jansenius' work was attacked by the Societas Jesu in particular, but it had other opponents as well, such as the Protestant theologian Gisbertus Voetius.

Through the Jesuit's efforts the Augustinus was condemned in 1642. Nevertheless, the work had its defenders, among who was the French monastery at Port-Royal-des-Champs. Blaise Pascal and Antoine Arnauld were the best known of the defenders of Jansenius' work, who also brought moral questions into the debate. Five of Jansenius' Augustinus' theses were condemned by Pope Innocent X in 1653. But, in reaction, Arnauld cum suis disputed the idea that these theses could as such be found in Jansenius' writings. In 1656 Pope Alexander VII declared that the theses, exactly as they had been condemned, were in fact precisely what Jansenius had meant. Then, only after Alexander VII's death a compromise was made under Pope Clement IX.

Tensions between the Leuven Faculty and the Jesuit Order heated up due in part to the fact that the Leuven faculty presented a list of propositions in 1653 and 1657 for condemnation, aimed against the Jesuits, claiming that they represented a theological laxism. Between 1677 and 1679, the faculty obtained the condemnation, through Pope Innocent XI, of 65 theses drawn from the writings of Jesuit moral theologians. The Jesuits in their turn obtained a condemnation of 31 rigorist propositions allegedly taught by the Leuven professors in 1713. The Jansenist controversy finally ended with the promulgation of the papal bull Unigenitus in 1713. After professors like Martin Steyaert turned to the Roman point of view, the entire faculty subjected itself to this position. The faculty became more conciliatory toward the central doctrinal authority in the eighteenth century, becoming a center of Ultramontanism through its dismissal of Gallicanism and Febronianism. The faculty's reputation was strengthened by its opposition to Joseph II of Austria's religious politics and to the vows imposed on clerics by the French Republic.

After the French Revolutionary Wars, by the Treaty of Campo Formio, signed on 17 October 1797, the Austrian Netherlands was ceded in perpetuity to the French Republic by the Holy Roman Empereur Francis II in exchange for the Republic of Venice. Once integrated into the French Republic, a law dating to 1793 mandating that all universities in France be closed came into effect. The University of Leuven was abolished by decree of the Département of the Dyle on 25 October 1797.

== See also ==
- Faculty of Theology and Religious Studies, Catholic University of Leuven

== Bibliography ==
- H. De Jongh, L'ancienne faculté de théologie de Louvain au premier siècle de son histoire, 1432–1540 (Paris, 1911).
- H. De Vocht, History of the Foundation and Rise of the Collegium Trilingue Lovaniense 1517–1550 (Leuven, 1951–55).
- R. Guelluy, "L'évolution des méthodes théologiques à Louvain d'Érasme à Jansénius", Revue d'Histoire Ecclésiastique 37 (1941) 31–144.
- Edmond Reusens, Documents relatifs à l’histoire de l’Université de Louvain (1425–1797) (Leuven, 1881–1903).
- J. Étienne, Spiritualisme érasmien et théologiens louvanistes. Un changement de problématique au début du XVI siècle (Leuven, Gembloux, 1956).
- M. Lamberigts, L. Kenis, L’Augustinisme à l’ancienne Faculté de théologie de Louvain (Leuven, 1994; BETL 111) 455 p.
- E.J.M. van Eijl, Facultas S. Theologiae Lovaniensis 1432–1797. Contributions to its history / Contributions à son histoire (Leuven, 1977; BETL, 45) 569 p.
- K. Blockx, De veroordeling van Maarten Luther door de Theologische Faculteit te Leuven in 1519 (Brussels, 1958).
- J. Wils, "Les professeurs de l'ancienne faculté de théologie de l'Université de Louvain, 1432–1789", Ephemerides theologicae Lovanienses 4 (1927): 338–358.
- P. F. X. de Ram, Mémoire sur la part que le clergé de Belgique et spécialement les docteurs de l'Université de Louvain ont prise au concile de Trente (Brussels, 1841).
- T. Quaghebeur, Pro aris et focis. Theologie en macht aan de Theologische Faculteit te Leuven 1617–1730 [unpublished doctoral dissertation, K.U. Leuven, Faculty of Arts] (Leuven, 2004).
