= Josse Ravesteyn =

Flemish Roman Catholic theologian

Josse Ravesteyn, also spelled Ravestein (ca. 1506–1570), was a Flemish Roman Catholic theologian.

== Biography ==
Born about 1506, at Tielt, a small town in Flanders, hence often called Tiletanus (Jodacus)). He studied philosophy at the Collège du Lys, in the University of Leuven, and in 1525 graduated fourth. He was appointed to teach philosophy in the same college, where he continued his course of theology, under the professors, Ruard Tapper and Jan Hessels (also known as Jean Leonardi Hasselius). From 1540 to 1553 he was president of the College of Houterle, and associated with the Abbé de Ste-Gertrude as guardian of the privileges of the university. In 1546 he became ordinary professor in the theological faculty and canon of the first rank in the collegiate chapter of St-Pierre. He was then only a licentiate in theology, but received the doctorate on 5 October following.

On the recommendation of Holy Roman Emperor Charles V he was sent to the Council of Trent (1551) and took an active part in the preparatory work of Sessions XIII-XVI. Arrived at Trent in September 1551, with his four colleagues from the University of Leuven, he presented in November a memorandum "super articulis de sacramentis poenitentiae at extremae unctionis". Later he drew up another on the two articles concerning the Mass. Called by Ferdinand I to the Conference of Worms in 1557, he accompanied Franciscus Sonnius and Martin Rythovius and there met three other theologians from the Low Countries: Jean Delphinus, Barthélemy Latomus, and Peter Canisius.

About 1558 he was made provost of Walcourt, in Namur. In 1561, on the resumption of the work of the general council, he was proposed as a delegate, but failing health forced him to decline the honour. In 1559 he succeeded Ruard Tappert as director of the nuns in the hospital at Leuven, an office he filled till his death, 1570. Through personal merit Ravesteyn was selected as rector of the university in 1545 and 1550.

He was a pious and learned priest, zealous in teaching purity of doctrine. Through his efforts the teachings of the innovator Michel Baius were censured by the Spanish Universities of Salamanca and Alcalá, by the Faculty of Paris in 1560, and by Pius V in his Bull "Ex omnibus afflictionibus" of 1 October 1567.

== Writings ==
Ravesteyn's works are: "Epistola Ven. Patri Laurentio Villavincentio", against Baianism; "Demonstratio religionis christianae ex verbo Dei"; "Confessionis, sive doctrinae, quae nuper edita est a ministris qui in ecclesiam Antverpiensem irrepserunt et Augustanae confessioni se assentiri profitentur succincta confutatio"; "Apologia Catholicae confutationis profanae illius et pestilentis confessionis, quam contra inanes cavillationes Matthaei Flacci Illyrici"; "De concordia gratiae et liberi arbitrii"; "Epistolae tres Michaeli de Bay"; "Apologia seu defensio decretorum concilii Tridentini de sacramentis adversus censuaras et examen Martini Kemnitii" in two parts. In this "Apology", which is his chief work, the author comments on, and brilliantly defends, the dogmatic decrees of Sessions IV-VI, the doctrine concerning the Canon of the Scriptures, original sin and justification, the sacraments in general, baptism, confirmation, the Eucharist as a sacrament and as a sacrifice. He died before writing a third part, in which he intended to treat of the other sacraments.
