= Diocese of Ypres =

Roman Catholic titular see

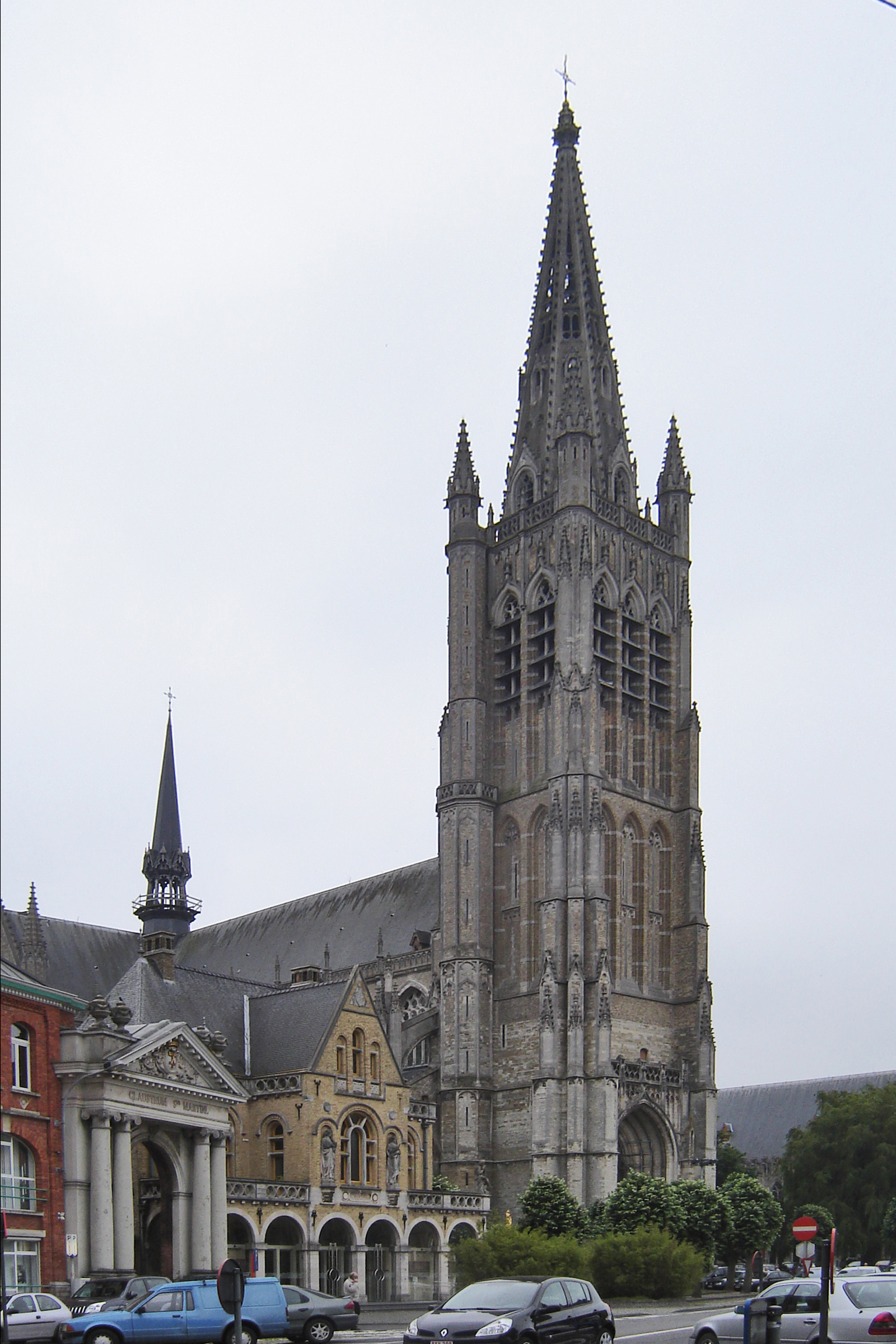
St Martin's Cathedral in Ypres was the see of the Diocese of Ypres.

The former Roman Catholic Diocese of Ypres, in present-day Belgium, existed from 1559 to 1801. Its seat was St Martin's Cathedral in Ypres. In 1969 it was reconstituted as a titular see.

== History ==
The diocese was originally part of the Diocese of Thérouanne, which had been established in the 7th or 8th century. In 1553 Charles V, Holy Roman Emperor besieged the city of Thérouanne, then a French enclave in the Holy Roman Empire, in revenge for a defeat by the French at Metz. After he captured Thérouanne, he razed the city. In 1557, as a result of the war damage to its see, the diocese was abolished. This led to a reform of sees at the Council of Trent and the bishopric of Thérouanne was split between the Diocese of Saint-Omer, the Diocese of Boulogne and the Diocese of Ypres. With this, Saint Martin's Church was elevated to cathedral status, as it became the see of the new diocese.

After the Concordat of 1801 between Napoleon and Pope Pius VII, Ypres was incorporated into the Diocese of Ghent, and Saint Martin's lost its status as a cathedral.

Cornelius Jansen, the father of the theological movement Jansenism, was Bishop of Ypres from 1635 to 1638.

== Bishops ==
- Martin Rythovius 1561–1583
- Petrus Simons 1584–1605
- Charles Maes 1607–1610, also bishop of Ghent
- Jean de Visscher 1611–1613
- Antoine de Haynin 1614–1626
- George Chamberlain 1627–1634
- Cornelius Jansen (Jansenius) 1635–1638
- Josse Bouckaert 1641–1646
- Josse Croy 1647
- Ambrosius Capello 1647 (also bishop of Antwerp)
- N. 1647
- Jean-François de Robles 1654–1659
- Martin Prats 1665–1671
- Henri of Halmale 1672–1676
- Guillaume Herincx (O.F.M.) 1677-1678
- Jacques de Lière 1679 (not confirmed by the Pope)
- Martin de Ratabon 1693–1713, (also bishop of Viviers)
- Ch.-Fr.-Guy de Laval-Montmorency 06/05/1713–26/08/1713
- Jean-Baptiste de Smet 1718–1732 (also bishop of Ghent)
- Guillaume Delvaux 1732–1761
- Félix-Jo.-Hubert de Wavrans 1762–1784
- Charles-Alexandre D'Arberg 1786–1801, died 1809, last bishop

== Titular bishops and archbishops ==
- Joseph Mees 1969-2001, archbishop, (Apostolic Nuncio to South Africa 1985-1987)
- Gustaaf Joos 2003-2003, archbishop, (Cardinal - Deacon of S. Pier Damiani ai Monti di S. Paolo)
- Jacques André Blaquart 2006-2010, bishop (auxiliary bishop of Bordeaux, Bishop of Orléans)
- Jean Kockerols 2011-, bishop (auxiliary bishop of Mechelen-Brussels)
