= Guillaume Herincx =

Belgian Franciscan theologian and bishop (1621–1678)

His Excellency, Monseigneur Guillaume Herincx O.F.M.
- Episc. Yprensis
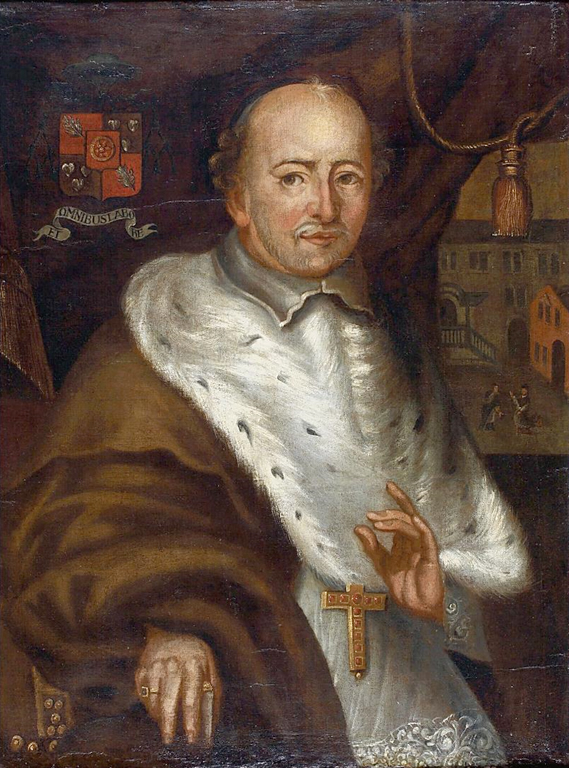
- Guillaume Herincx
- Church: Roman Catholic
- See: Ypres
- Predecessor: Henri of Halmale
- Other post: minister provincial

Personal details
- Born: Helmond, North Brabant
- Died: 17 August 1678
- Buried: Cathedral, Ypres
- Education: University of Leuven

Guillaume Herincx (Willem Herinx; 1621 – 17 August 1678), was a Belgian Franciscan theologian. He became bishop of Ypres.

== Life ==
Herincx was born at Helmond, North Brabant. After receiving his preliminary education at 's-Hertogenbosch he entered the University of Louvain, where he devoted himself to the study of the ancient classics and obtained the degree of doctor of philosophy. After completing his university course, he resolved to embrace the religious state and entered the Franciscan Order.

In 1653 he was appointed lecturer in theology at Louvain. After fifteen years spent in teaching theology, Father Herincx was honoured with the title of lector jubilate, equivalent to the university degree of doctor of divinity.

He was twice elected minister provincial, then definitor general, and finally commissary general for the northern countries of Europe. On 28 April 1677, whilst making a canonical visitation in England, he received word at Newport that Charles II had nominated him Bishop of Ypres.

He was consecrated on 24 October in the same year, in the Franciscan church, Brussels. He left immediately for his diocese but ruled it for less than a year; he died while making his first diocesan visitation.

The epitaph on his tombstone in the cathedral of Ypres says: "Ob virtutem et omnimodam eruditionem ad has infulas assumptus". Letters found in his room after his death show that his promotion to the cardinalate had been determined on by the pope.

== Works ==
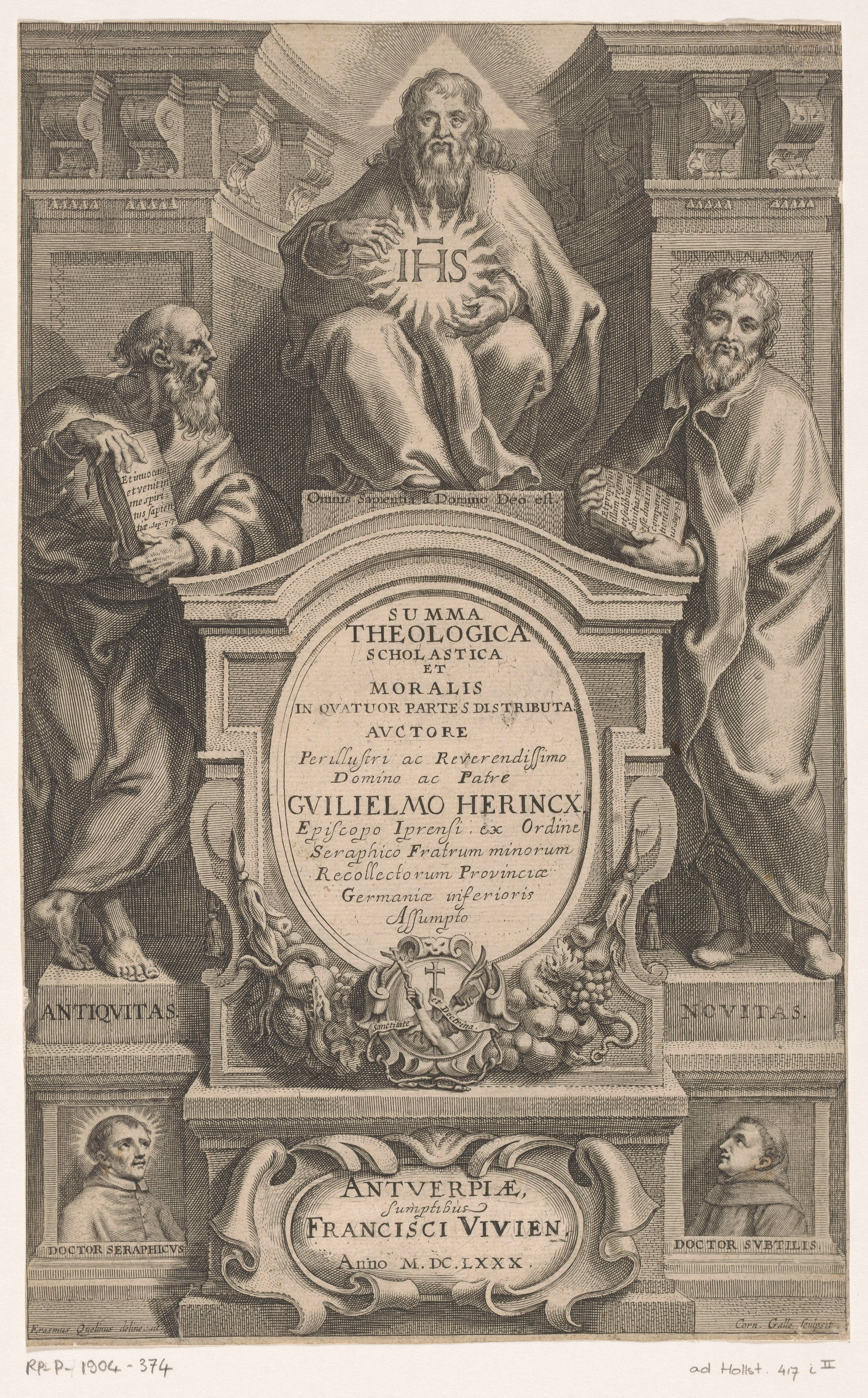
Guillaume Herincx, Summa Theologica scholastica et moralis, Antwerp, F. Vivien, 1680.

His superiors, who had observed his talent and success in teaching, ordered him (1658) to draw up a course of theology for use in the Franciscan schools, and the first volume of his work was published in 1660. In the preface to his Summa Theologica, he writes:

The teaching of theology does not consist alone in the search after truth, but it behooves us to make use of the truth for our own sanctification and for the sanctification of others, and above all for kindling and nourishing in ourselves and in others the love of God.

According to the constitutions of his order, Father Herincx propounds the doctrine of Duns Scotus, but he does not neglect the teachings of Bonaventure or Thomas Aquinas.

Father Herincx was a Probabilist, and his tractate "De conscientia" is considered one of his most significant works. He shows that the system of Probabilism is not altogether new, and he draws his proofs from Aquinas, Bonaventure, St. Antonine, and Scotus, although the Subtle Doctor is not so explicit on the matter as the other ancient writers. According to Herincx, the tempest that arose in the seventeenth century against Probabilism had its origin in Jansenism, for Rigorism was unknown among the theologians of the Middle Ages.

The decrees of Pope Alexander VII, issued in 1665 and 1666, after the publication of Herincx's work, called for some modifications in the latter, and Father Guillaume van Goorlaeken, lector jubilate, was commissioned to bring out a new edition.

His "Summa Theologica Scholastica et Moralis" was published at Antwerp, 1660–63; 2nd ed., 1680; 3rd, 1702-04. His Centiloqium Theologicum was apparently influenced by Theodore Smising.
