= Jean Hessels =

Flemish theologian and controversialist

Jan Hessels, Jean Leonardi Hasselius or Jean Hessels (Hasselt, 1522 – 1566) was a Flemish theologian and controversialist at the University of Louvain. He was a defender of Baianism.

== Life ==
Hessels was born at Mechlin in 1522, and obtained his doctorate in theology from Louvain. He had been teaching for eight years in Park Abbey, the Premonstratensian house near Louvain, when in 1560, he was appointed professor of theology at the university. Like Michael Baius, who was his senior colleague, Hessels preferred drawing his theology from the Church Fathers, especially from Augustine of Hippo, rather than from the Schoolmen. While Chancellor Ruard Tapper and Josse Ravesteyn, Professor of Theology were at the Council of Trent, Baius and Hessels took the occasion to introduce new methods and new doctrines.

Not content, however, with a mere change of method they began to show their contempt for traditional opinions, and in a short time alarming rumours were in circulation both inside and outside the university that their teaching on Original Sin, Grace, and Free-will, was not in harmony with the doctrine of the Church. The Franciscans submitted to the judgment of the Sorbonne a number of propositions (18) selected from the writings or lectures of Baius and his friends, and the opinion of the Sorbonne was distinctly unfavourable.

As the dispute grew more heated and threatened to have serious consequences for the university and the country, in 1563, the Archbishop of Mechlin, Cardinal Granvelle, believing that the absence of the two professors might lead to peace, induced both to accompany theology professor the elder Cornelius Jansenius (later Bishop of Ghent) to the Council of Trent as the theologians of the King of Spain (1563). There, Hessels took an active part. He prepared the decree "De invocatione et reliquiis sanctorum et sacris imaginibus".

Even at Trent the Scholastic party found fault with his departure from the beaten tracks of learning; after his return the attacks continued. Rather than wasting his energy on dogmatic quarrels, Hessels, directed his efforts in polemical works against Protestantism. In his support of papal infallibility he was an opponent of Georgius Cassander. He also upheld the doctrine of the Immaculate Conception (impugned by Baius).

He died November 7, 1566.

== Works ==
His polemical works are:

- "De invocatione sanctorum . . . censura" (1568);
- "Probatio corporalis præsentiæ corporis et sanguinis dominici in Eucharistia (Cologne, 1563); (Leuven, 1563) available at KU Leuven Special Collections.
- "Confutatio confessionis hæreticæ, teutonice emissæ, qua ostenditur Christum esse sacrificium propitiatorium" (Louvain, 1565);
- "Oratio de officio pii viri exsurgente et vigente hæresi" (Louvain, 1565);
- "Declaratio quod sumptio Eucharistiæ sub unica panis specie neque Christi præcepto aut institutioni adversetur" (Louvain).

He also wrote commentaries:

- "De Passione Domini" (Louvain, 1568);
- "de I Tim. et I Petri" (Louvain, 1568);
- "Com. de Evang. Matthæi" (Louvain, 1572); "Com. de Epp. Johannis" (Douai, 1601).

His chief dogmatic work is a Catechism, first published in 1571, by Henry Gravius, who removed from it all traces of Baianism.

== Sources ==
- Mathijs Lamberigts, Leo Kenis (1994), L'Augustinisme à l'ancienne Faculté de théologie de Louvain, pp. 99–122
