= Michael Baius =

Belgian theologian

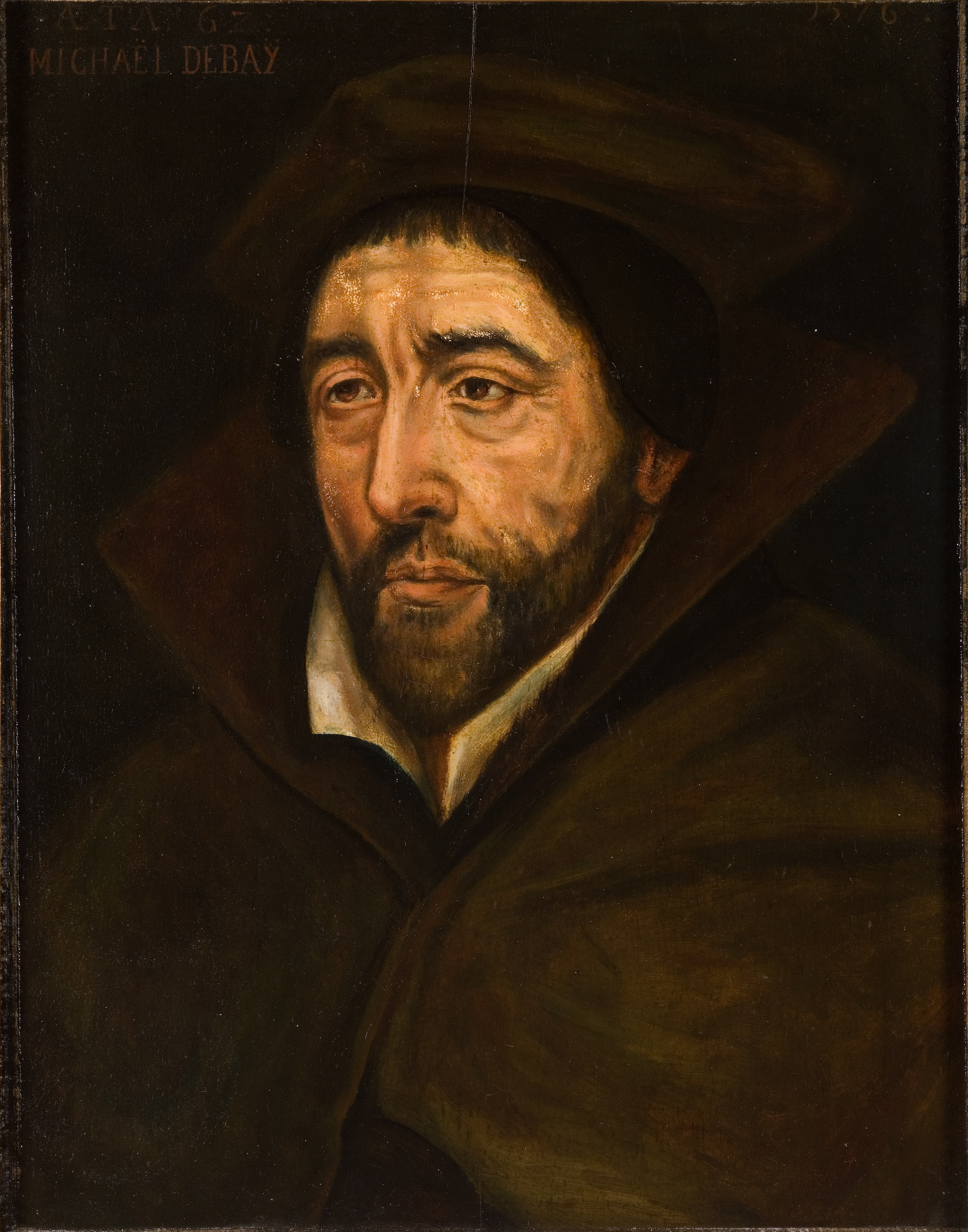
- Painting of Baius
- Born: Michel De Bay; 1513; Meslin-l'Évêque, Belgium
- Died: September 16, 1589 (aged 75–76); Leuven, Belgium
- Occupation: Theologian
- Known for: Baianism

Michael Baius, also known as Michel De Bay, (1513 – 16 September 1589) was a Belgian theologian. He formulated the school of thought now known as Baianism.

== Life ==
He was born at Meslin L'Eveque near Ath in Hainaut as Michel De Bay, the son of Jean de Bay, a farmer. Baius studied humanities in Brugelette and in Enghien and in 1533, he began studying philosophy at the Grand College het Varken of Leuven University. From 1535, he also studied theology at the Pope Adrian VI College. He was an excellent student and was ordained a priest in 1542, and was appointed director of the Standonck-College in Leuven.

In 1544, Baius obtained his doctorate in philosophy and became a teacher at the College het Varken. In 1549, Baius was appointed professor of scholastic philosophy. The following year, Baius also obtained a license in theology and became president of the College Adrian, and also substituted for the professor of Holy Scripture, who was then absent at the Council of Trent. From February to August 1553, he was the rector of the university. Baius had very early formed a close friendship with Jean Hessels.

While Chancellor Ruard Tapper and Josse Ravesteyn, Professor of Theology were at the Council of Trent, Baius and Hessels took the occasion to introduce new methods and new doctrines. They believed that Catholic apologists were seriously handicapped by their reliance on the authority and methods of the Scholastics, and that if instead of appealing to the writings of St. Thomas as the ultimate criterion of truth they were to insist more on the authority of the Bible and of the works of the Early Fathers, such as St. Cyprian, St. Jerome, and St. Augustine, they would find themselves on much safer ground, and their arguments would be more likely to command the respect of their opponents.

On his return from Trent in 1552, Tapper asked Cardinal de Granvelle, archbishop of Mechelen, to intervene. Granvelle succeeded in quieting the innovators for a while. Baius's theories were very popular with theology students who spread it further. This was met with much opposition, and around 1558, later Cardinal Antoine Perrenot de Granvelle and Viglius tried unsuccessfully to persuade Baius to make some adjustments to his positions. However, in 1560, at the request of the Franciscans, the Sorbonne condemned 18 of his statements. Baius answered the censure in a memoir now lost, and the controversy only increased in acridity. Pope Pius IV, through Cardinal Granvelle, imposed silence upon both Baius and the Franciscans, without, however, rendering any doctrinal decision.

== Career ==
Michael Baius, age 62

In 1563, he was nominated one of the Belgian representatives at the Council of Trent, but arrived too late to play an important part in its deliberations. Indeed, there was resistance to his presence at the Council, and he was allowed to attend only as a theologian of the King of Spain. The Council Fathers looked upon him with not a little suspicion. Just before leaving for Trent, Baius had published his first tracts. The contents of those tracts were not within the programme of the last three sessions of the Council of Trent, so no public discussion of the disputed points took place. It is known, however, that Baius' and Hessels' views were distasteful to the Fathers, and that the Catholic king's prestige alone saved them from formal condemnation.

Baius returned to Leuven in 1564, and published new tracts the same year. Here, he obtained a great name as a leader in the anti-scholastic reaction of the 16th century. The champions of this reaction fought under the banner of Augustine of Hippo though paradoxically they undermined Augustine's doctrine of grace; as a result, Baius' heterodox-Augustinian predilections brought him into conflict with Rome on questions of grace, free-will and the like. In various respects, Baius was seen as Pelagian. Ravestein, who had succeeded Tapper as chancellor, informed Rome, requesting decisive action. On 1 October 1567, Pope Pius V signed the papal bull Ex omnibus afflictionibus, in which he condemned seventy-nine propositions from Baius' writings, but without mention of Baius' name. To this Baius submitted; though certain indiscreet utterances on the part of himself and his supporters led to a renewal of the condemnation in 1579 by Pope Gregory XIII. Baius, however, was allowed to retain his professorship, and even became chancellor of Leuven in 1575.

== Death ==
He died, still holding these two offices, in 1589. His writings are described by Adolf Harnack as a curious mixture of Catholic orthodoxy and unconscious tendencies to Protestantism. His principal works were published in a collected form at Cologne, 1696; some large treatises were excluded. There is a study of both books and author by Linsenmann, Michael Baius und die Grundlegung des Jansenismus, published at Tübingen in 1867.

== Beliefs ==
Baius based his theology on Holy Scripture and the Fathers of the Church, especially on the teaching of Augustine of Hippo, introducing deviant scholastic terminologies. His doctrine, later referred to as Baianism, was based on sin, free will, and grace of God along with the fight against papal infallibility, saying that the episcopal legal power comes directly from God. Joseph Sollier, writing in the Catholic Encyclopedia sees Baius as a precursor to the Jansenism and the Port-Royal theologians such as Blaise Pascal.

== Works ==
- Michaelis Baii Sacrarum litterarum in Academia Loviensi
