= Jacobus Yetzweirtius =

16th c. Flemish nobleman

Jacobus Yetzweirtius or Yetzweirt (born 1541) was a 16th-century nobleman who served in the Army of Flanders and wrote about the 1572 retaking of Oudenaarde.

== Life ==
Yetzweirtius was born in Bergues-Saint-Winoc in 1541, to a noble family of slender means. After travelling widely, he took service in the Army of Flanders as an ensign. He took part in the retaking of Oudenaarde in October 1572, writing a Latin verse account of the action that was published in Ghent. Little is known of his later life.

== Works ==
- Aldenardias sive de subdola ac furtiva Guesiorum in civitatem Aldenardensem irreptione (Ghent, Joannes Lapidanus, 1573). On Google Books
- Two pieces in Jacobus Sluperius, Poemata (Antwerp, Joannes Bellerus, 1575), pp. 289–291, 417–419. On Google Books
