= Baianism =

Heterodox Catholic school of thought

Baianism is a term applied to the school of thought of Catholic theologian Michael Baius (1513–1589). Its foremost apologists, Baius among them, largely claimed this school and its teachings to be a return to a sort of Augustinianism, against the reliance on Scholasticism and scholastic writings which held sway over most Catholic theologians at the time. It is the immediate historical predecessor of Jansenism, which was condemned as heresy, while Baianism has been deemed heterodox by the Catholic Church.

== Michel Baius ==
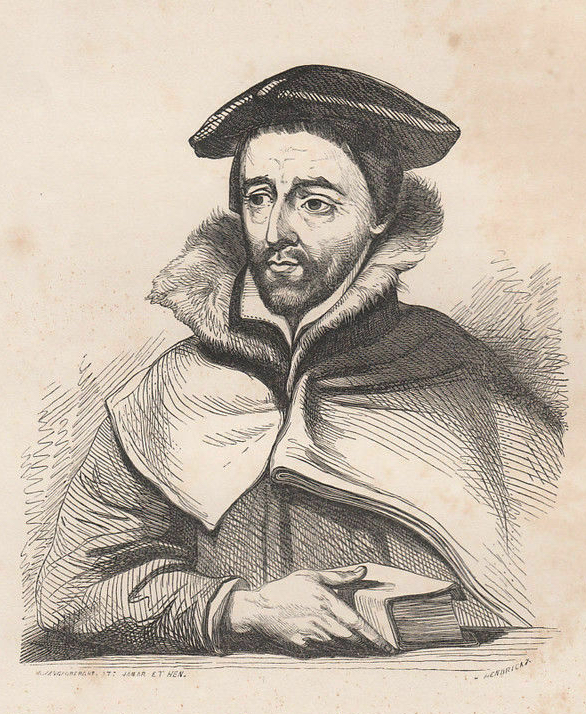
Michel De Bay (Baius)

Michel Baius was born at Meslin in Hainaut, the son of Jean de Bay, a farmer. He studied humanities in Brugelette and in Enghien and in 1533 he began studying philosophy at the Old University of Leuven. From 1535 he also studied theology at Pope Adrian VI College. He was ordained a priest in 1542, and was appointed director of the Standonck-College in Leuven. In 1550, Baius obtained a license in theology and became president of the College Adrian. He also substituted for the professor of Holy Scripture, who was then absent at the Council of Trent.

While Chancellor Ruard Tapper and Josse Ravesteyn, Professor of Theology were at the Council of Trent, Baius and his colleague Jean Hessels took the occasion to introduce new methods and new doctrines. They believed that Catholic apologists were seriously handicapped by their reliance on the authority and methods of the Scholastics, and that if instead of appealing to the writings of St. Thomas as the ultimate criterion of truth they were to insist more on the authority of the Bible and of the works of the Early Fathers, such as St. Cyprian, St. Jerome, and St. Augustine, they would find themselves on much safer ground, and their arguments would be more likely to command the respect of their opponents.

At the request of the Franciscans, the Sorbonne university of Paris censured eighteen propositions embodying the main innovations of Baius and Hessels. Baius answered the censure in a memoir now lost, and the controversy only increased. Pope Pius IV, through Cardinal Granvelle, Archbishop of Mechelen imposed silence upon both Baius and the Franciscans, without, however, rendering any doctrinal decision.

In 1561, Baius attended the Council of Trent as a theologian of the King of Spain. Baius returned to Leuven in 1564 and the same year published new tracts. Ravestein, who had succeeded Tapper as chancellor, informed Rome, requesting decisive action. On 1 October 1567, Pope Pius V signed the papal bull "Ex omnibus afflictionibus", in which were to be found a number of condemned propositions, but without mention of Baius' name. Baius kept neutral at first, but when the papal bull (1567) was brought to the university and read to the faculty, he subscribed with the other professors. Baius abjured to Morillon, de Granvelle's vicar general, all the errors condemned in the Bull, but was not then and there required to sign his recantation.

At Leuven, Baius achieved a great name as a leader in the anti-scholastic reaction of the 16th century. The champions of this reaction fought under the banner of Augustine of Hippo though paradoxically undermined Augustine's doctrine of grace; as a result, Baius's heterodox-Augustinian predilections brought him into conflict with Rome on questions of grace, free-will and the like.

In 1570, at Ravestein's death, Baius became dean of the faculty. Then rumors went abroad that the new dean was by no means in accord with orthodox teaching. Followers and adversaries suggested a clear pronouncement. It came under the title of the "Explicatio articulorum", in which Baius averred that, of the many condemned propositions, some were false and justly censured, some only ill expressed, while still others, if at variance with the terminology of the Scholastics, were yet the genuine sayings of the Fathers; at any rate, with more than forty of the seventy-nine articles he claimed to have nothing whatever to do. Baius was made Chancellor of Leuven, Dean of St. Peter's Collegiate Church, and "conservator" of the university's privileges. In 1579 Pope Gregory XIII issued the bull, "Provisionis nostræ" confirming the preceding papal decision.

== Baianist doctrine ==
Baius's system is contained in a series of opuscula, or pamphlets:

- "On Free Will"
- "Justice and Justification"
- "Sacrifice"
- "Meritorious Works"
- "Man's Original Integrity and the Merits of the Wicked"
- "The Sacraments"
- "The Form of Baptism"
- "Original Sin"
- "Charity"
- "Indulgences"
- "Prayers for the Dead"

Baius himself collected all these pamphlets in M. Baii opuscula theologica (Leuven, 1566). The Maurist monk Gabriel Gerberon gave a more complete edition: M. Baii opera cum bullis pontificum et aliis ad ipsius causum spectantibus (Cologne, 1696). This edition was put on the Index in 1697 on account of its second part, called Baiana, which the censors deemed to show too much sympathy for Baius. The gist of Baianism is also found in the 79 propositions censured by Pius V. The first 60 are easily identified in Baius' printed works, and the remaining 19 – "tales quae vulgo circumferrentur", says an old manuscript copy of the bull "Ex omnibus"– represent the oral teaching of the Baianist wing.

Baius believed in three states of man, which he laid out in the preface to "Man's Original Integrity", writing: "What was in the beginning the integrity natural to man? Without that question one can understand neither the first corruption of nature (by original sin) nor its reparation by the grace of Christ."

=== (1) State of innocent nature ===
The writings of the Church Fathers strongly assert the actual conjunction of nature and grace in the first man. From this, Baius inferred a necessary connection between grace and the natural state of man. He believed that primitive innocence was not supernatural, but the natural state of mankind. In this state, Baius believed, the nature of man was to adhere to God through the observance of the commandments and through the gifts of the Holy Spirit.

Baius believed that the primitive state of man necessarily included destination to heaven; immunity from ignorance, suffering, and death; and the inherent power of meriting. He held that these were not gratuitous gifts of grace, but natural to mankind.

=== (2) State of Fallen Nature ===
The downfall of man is not, and cannot be, according to Baius, the mere forfeiting of gratuitous or supernatural gifts, but some positive evil reaching deep into our very nature. That evil is original sin. By original sin Baius understands, instead of a simple privation of grace, habitual concupiscence itself, transmitted according to the laws of heredity and developed according to the laws of physical and psychical growth. It is a sin or moral evil by itself, even in irresponsible children, and that outside of all relation to a will, be it original or personal.

Baius considers human liberty unnecessary for moral responsibility; he argues that a moral agent can be bound by internal determinism, as long as there is no external compulsion. He holds that, without Redemption, only tainted actions can proceed from tainted human nature. They may sometimes appear virtuous, but it is only an appearance (vitia virtutes imitantia). In truth all human actions, not purified by Redemption, are vices pure and simple and damning vices at that (vitia sunt et damnant).

=== (3) State of Redeemed Nature ===
In Baius's schema, the gifts of primitive innocence, forfeited by original sin, are restored by Jesus Christ. Then and then only do they become graces, not, indeed, on account of their supernatural character, but because of fallen man's positive unworthiness. Aided by grace, the redeemed can perform virtuous actions and acquire merits for heaven. This does not, for Baius, entail a higher status, an inner renovation or sanctifying grace. Moral action, whether called justice, or charity, or obedience to the law, is the sole instrument of justification and virtue and merit. The role of grace consists exclusively in keeping concupiscence under control, and in thus enabling us to perform moral actions and fulfil the law.

Baius speaks of the remission of sin as necessary for justification, but this is only a fictio iuris; in fact, a catechumen before baptism, or a penitent before absolution may, by simply keeping the precepts, have more charity than certain so-called just men. If the catechumen and penitent are not styled just, it is only in deference to Holy Scripture, which requires for complete justice both newness of life (i.e. moral action) and pardon of sin (i.e. of the reatus, or liability to punishment). To grant that kind of pardon is the only object and efficacy of the sacraments of the dead, baptism and penance. With regard to the sacraments of the living, the Eucharist–the only one on which Baius expressed his views–has no other sacrificial value than that of being a good moral action drawing the recipient close to God.

== Catholic view ==
The Catholic teaching, already outlined against the Pelagians by various councils and popes from the fifth century, is fully presented against the Reformers by the Council of Trent, especially Session V, Decree on Original Sin, and Session VI, Decree on Justification. Those two sessions, both anterior to Baius' writings, contain three statements which are obviously irreconcilable with Baius' three main positions described above: (1) Man's original justice is represented as a supernatural gift; (2) Original Sin is described not as a deep deterioration of human nature, but as the forfeiture of purely gratuitous privileges; (3) Justification is depicted as an interior renovation of the soul by inherent grace.

A more precise determination of the Catholic doctrine is given in the consensus Catholicorum theologorum. That consensus was voiced with no uncertainty by such universities as Paris, Salamanca, Alcalá and Leuven itself, and by such theologians as Cunerus Petri (d. 1580 – "De gratiâ", Cologne, 1583); Suarez (d. 1617 – "De gratiâ Dei" in Op. Omn., VII, Paris, 1857); Robert Bellarmine (d. 1623 – "De gratiâ et libero arbitrio", in Controversiæ, IV, Milan, 1621); Juan Martínez de Ripalda (d. 1648–"Adversus Baium et Baianos", Paris, 1872); Stayaert (d. 1701 – "In propositiones damnatas assertiones", Leuven, 1753); Honoré Tournély (d. 1729 – "De Gratiâ Christi", Paris, 1726); Casini (d. 1755 – "Quid est homo?" ed. Scheeben, Mainz, 1862).

== Influence of Baianism ==
Even apart from Jansenism, which is a direct offshoot of Baianism, some traces of Baius's ideas about the natural and the supernatural are to be found in the history of theology. The Augustinian School, represented by such men as Henry Noris, Fulgentius Bellelli and Giovanni Lorenzo Berti, adopted, though with qualifications, the idea of man's natural aspiration to the possession of God and beatific vision in Heaven. The standard work of that school, "Vindiciæ Augustinianæ", was even once denounced to the Holy See, but no censure ensued. Later Benedict Stattler, Georg Hermes, Anton Günther, J. B. Hirscher and Johannes von Kuhn evolved a notion of the supernatural which is akin to that of Baius. While admitting relatively supernatural gifts, they denied that the partaking of Divine nature and the adoption to eternal life differ essentially from our natural moral life. That theory was opposed by Kleutgen and seems now to have died out. Matulewicz, "Doctrina Russorum de Statu iustitiæ originalis" (Cracow, 1903), says that modern Russian theology embodies in great measure the views of Baius.

Baianism is a type of Augustinianism that sought to purify Augustinianism from Scholastic mutations that merged it with Aristotle. "But this was condemned as simply a form of Pelagianism where nature was sufficient to itself."

Pope Gregory XVI observed that there were hints ("che sanno") of Baianism in the decrees of the Melkite Greek Catholic Church's Synod held at Qarqafe, Beirut, in 1806. The leaders of the Melkite church subsequently resiled from the opinions of the synod and Gregory formally condemned its teaching in his brief of 1835, Melchitarum Catholicorum.

== Sources ==
- "Baius, Michael". Encyclopædia Britannica. Encyclopædia Britannica Premium Service. 2005.
