= William Damasus Lindanus =

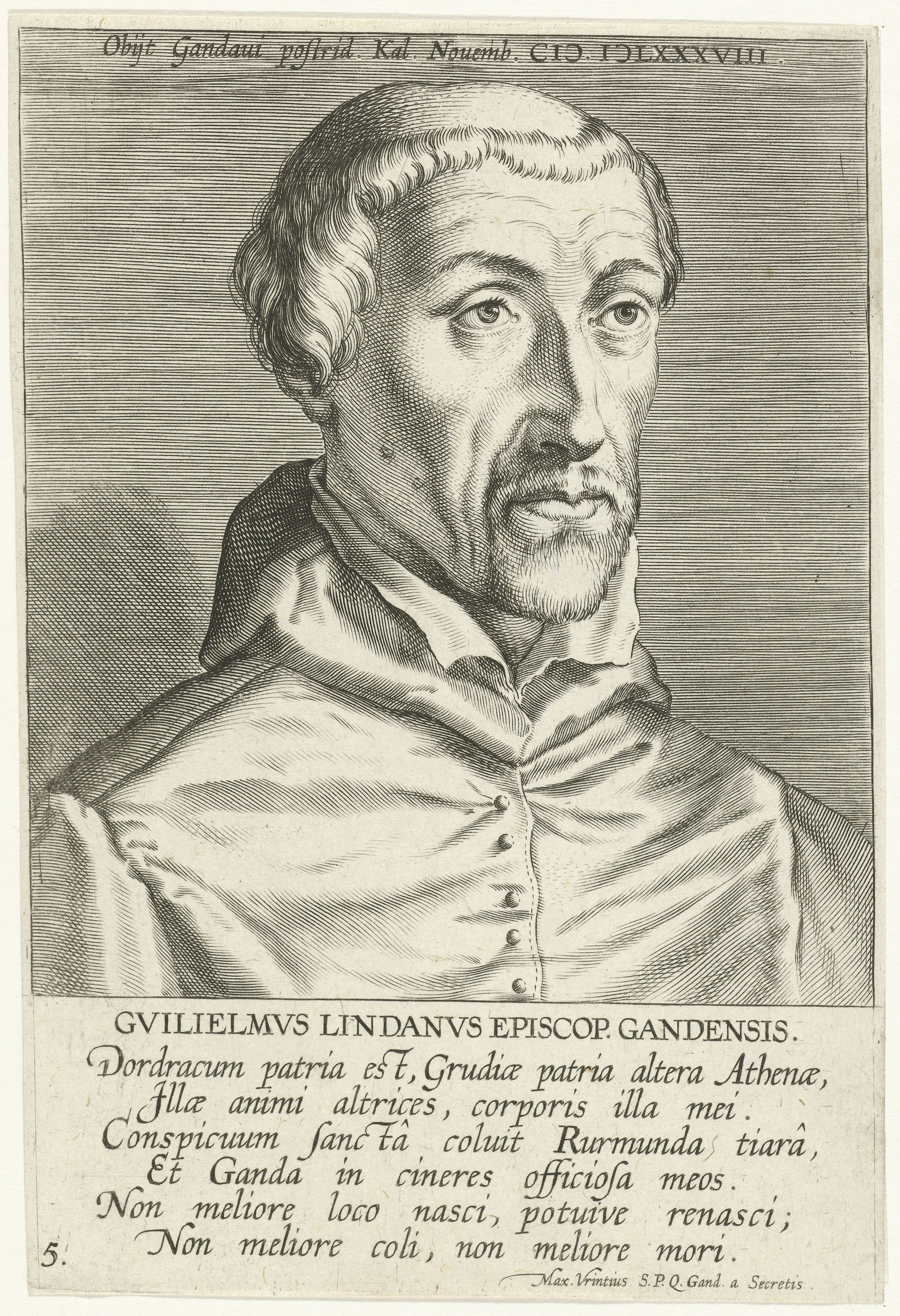
W.D. Lindanus (1588)

William Damasus Lindanus or Van der Lindt (1525 – 2 November 1588) was a 16th-century Bishop of Roermond and Bishop of Ghent.

== Biography ==
William Damasus Lindanus was born at Dordrecht in 1525, the son of Damasus van der Lint. He studied philosophy and theology at the University of Leuven, and having during this time applied himself also to Greek and Hebrew, went to Paris to perfect himself in these languages. In 1552 he won the licenciate at Leuven, and the same year was ordained to the priesthood. Two years later, he was appointed professor of Sacred Scripture at the University of Dillingen.

In 1556, he took the doctor's degree at Leuven, and was appointed vicar-general to the Bishop of Utrecht and dean of the chapter at the court chapel of the Binnenhof in The Hague. Soon afterwards he became a royal counsellor and inquisitor in Friesland. In 1562, the Habsburg king Philip II of Spain designated Lindanus for the newly erected See of Roermond, and the following year, on 4 April, he was consecrated in Brussels by Cardinal Granvelle. He was, however, unable to enter his diocese until 11 May 1569. The erection of this bishopric had caused displeasure throughout the Low Countries, especially in the country of Guelders, of which Roermond was a part: where every act of the royal authority excited defiance. The Protestants were dissatisfied with the appointment of Lindanus, who was a staunch defender of the Catholic faith. The new bishop began at once to reform his diocese, assisted in person at the Provincial Synods of Mechlin (1570) and of Leuven (1573) and carried out the Counter-Reformation laws and regulations of the Council of Trent.

In 1572, he was obliged to flee for several months from Roermond to the south of the Low Countries; on his return to his see, he defended vigorously the properties of the Church against the civil authorities. In 1573, a violent conflict broke out between himself and the Duke of Alba; and the Protestants obliged him to flee on several occasions. In 1578, he travelled to Rome and Madrid in order to obtain justice against the chapter of Maastricht, which had refused to execute the regulations concerning the episcopal endowment, and to confer with the Pope and the king upon the measures necessary for the safeguarding of the Faith in the Low Countries. Returning to Roermond, with the help of Philip II, he founded the royal seminary or college at Leuven, for the education of young clerics. Lindanus went to Rome again in 1584 to treat of the interests of his diocese and of the state of the Church in the Low Countries and in Germany; he insisted particularly upon the urgent necessity of replying in a scientific way to the Centuriators of Magdeburg. His work in Roermond was brought to a close by his elevation to the See of Ghent, where he began his new episcopal duties on 22 July 1588. He died there three months later on 2 November.

== Writings ==
Among his numerous works the following are especially worthy of mention: De optimo scripturas interpretandi genere (Cologne, 1558); panoplia evangelica (Cologne, 1560); Stromatum libri III pro defensione Concilii Tridentini (Cologne, 1575); Missa apostolica (Antwerp, 1589), and in a more popular form, the dialogues, Dubitantius and Ruwardius (Cologne, 1562-3).

He edited the academic discourses of Ruard Tapperus (1577–78), and wrote many works in Dutch for the instruction of his flock, in order to keep them from Protestantism and to refute the Confession of Antwerp of 1566.

== Sources ==
- Herbermann, Charles, ed. (1913). "William Damasus Lindanus". Catholic Encyclopedia. New York: Robert Appleton Company.
