= Cornelius Jansen (bishop of Ghent) =

Bishop of Ghent (1510–1578)

The Right Reverend Cornelius Jansen
- Bishop of Ghent
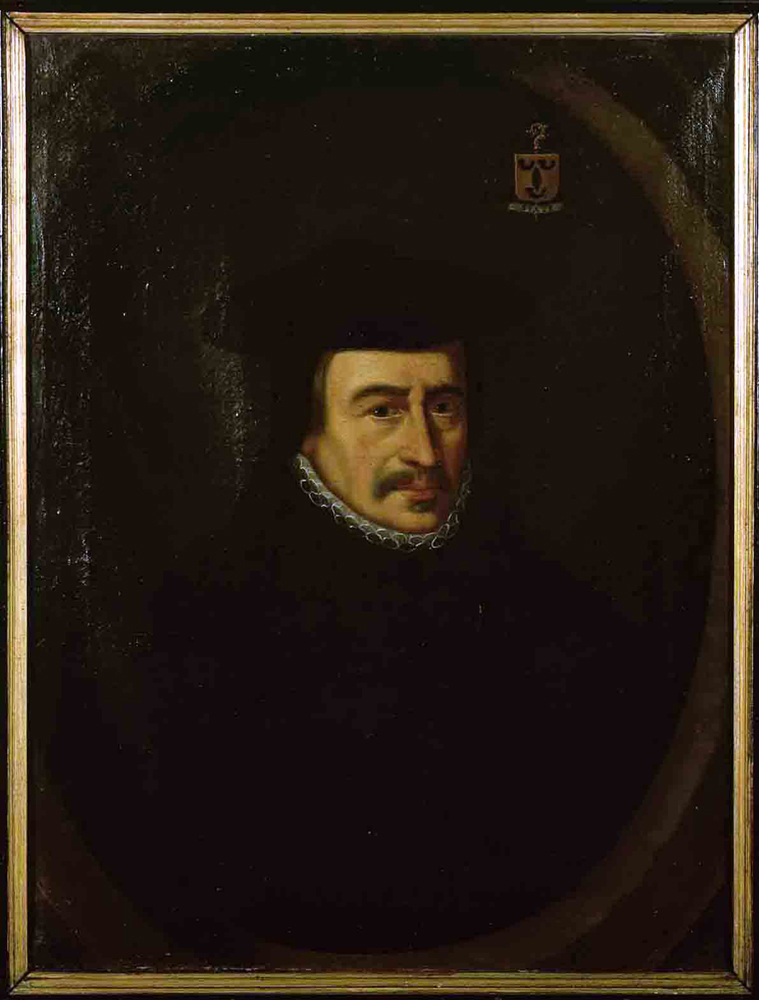
- Cornelius Jansenius Hulstensis
- Church: Roman Catholic
- Diocese: Ghent
- Appointed: 6 July 1565
- Term ended: 11 April 1576
- Predecessor: diocese established
- Successor: William Damasus Lindanus

Orders
- Consecration: 29 August 1568 by François Sonnius

Personal details
- Born: 1510 Hulst, Habsburg Netherlands
- Died: 11 April 1576 (aged 65–66) Ghent, Spanish Netherlands
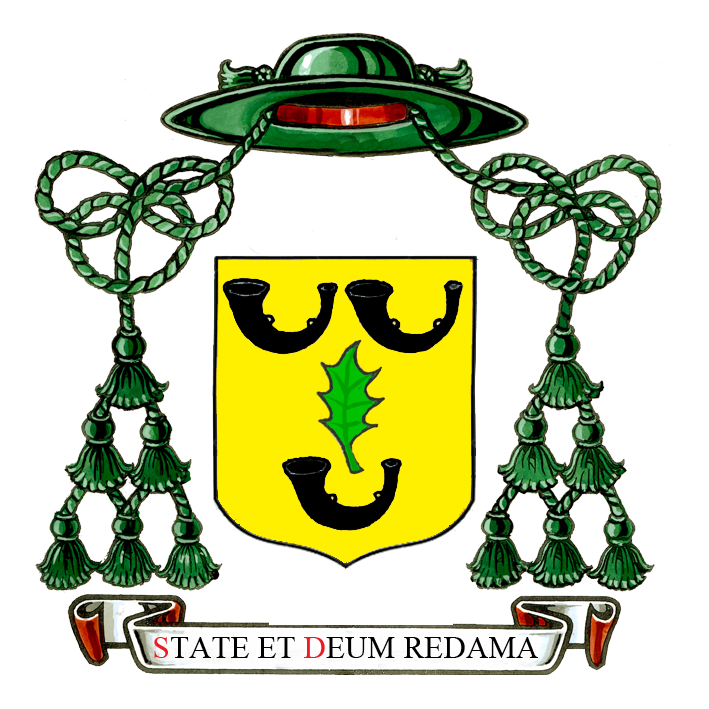
- Coat of arms

Cornelius Jansen the Elder (Note: Also Jansens, Janssen, Janssenius or Jansenius Gandavensis.) (Dutch: [ˈjɑnsə(n)]; 1510 – 11 April 1576) was a Catholic exegete and the first Bishop of Ghent. According to M.A. Screech, Jansen is considered by many to be the most outstanding Roman Catholic biblical scholar of his age.

== Life ==
He received his early education at Ghent from the Brethren of the Common Life (called at Ghent the Hieronymites), and later studied theology and Semitic languages at Leuven. He was a good Greek scholar. After he had become a licentiate of theology in 1534, at the request of the abbot of the Premonstratensian Abbey of Tongerloo, he lectured on the Holy Scripture, to the young monks until 1542, from which date until 1562 he discharged the duties of pastor of the parish of St. Martin at Kortrijk. Having finally attained the degree of Doctor of Theology in 1562, he was immediately appointed professor of theology at the Old University of Leuven, became in the following year dean of the collegiate seminary of St. James, and attended the last sessions of the Council of Trent as delegate of the university.

On his return, Philip II of Spain appointed him first bishop of the newly founded See of Ghent, which dated only from 1559. For a long time he refused to assume the dignity, on account of the difficult conditions in the diocese, and was not preconized until 1568, by Pope Pius V. As bishop he devoted himself especially to checking the advance of Protestantism, and to carrying out the decrees of the Council of Trent. With this object in view, in 1569, he founded the Major Seminary of Ghent in the Geeraard de Duivelsteen, held diocesan synods in 1571 and 1574, and published a ritual for his diocese. He was entrusted with the compilation of a ritual to be used in the ecclesiastical province of Mechlin, but did not finish it.

== Works ==
While at Tongerloo, Jansen wrote a great deal; as pastor at Kortrijk, he had already become widely known for his exegetical work.

Among Jansen's writings is the Concordia evangelica (Leuven, 1529 and 1549). To this he later added the Commentarius in Concordiam et totem historiam evangelicam (Leuven, 1572), his major work. In his exegesis, Jansen set aside the mystical interpretation of his predecessors, in favor of a more literal interpretation with an emphasis on the original text. His study of Semitic languages allowed him to reach a fuller comprehension of the Latin Vulgate.

Jansen's Commentarius in Proverbia Salomonis (Leuven, 1567) and Commentarius in Ecclesiasticum (Leuven, 1569) were republished in one work at Antwerp in 1589. His Commentarius in omnes Psalmos Davidicos (Leuven, 1569) gives an introduction to each psalm, a paraphrase of the text, and explanations of the difficult passages. He also published Paraphrases in ea Veteris Testamenti Cantica, quae per ferias singulas totius anni usus ecclesiasticus observat (Leuven, 1569), and, posthumously, Annotationes in Librum Sapientiae (Leuven, 1577). Tetrateuchus sive Commentarius in sancta Jesu Christi Euangelia was also later published (Brussel, 1728).
