= Holy Ghost College, Leuven =

Holy Spirit College
- Heilige Geestcollege
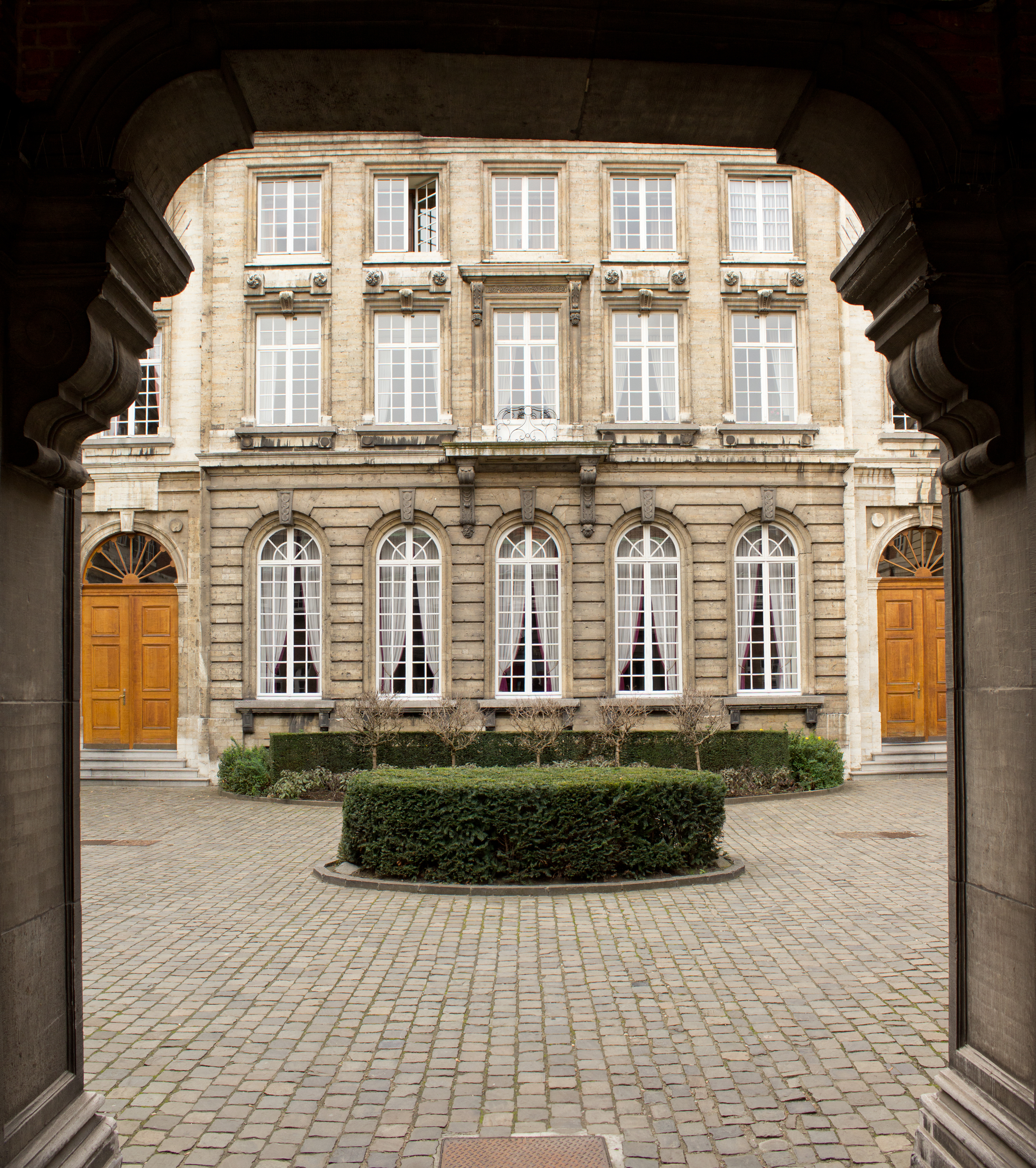
- Latin: Collegium Sancti Spiritus
- Other name: Collège du Saint-Esprit
- Type: college
- Active: 1442–1797
- Religious affiliation: Catholic
- Academic affiliation: Old University of Leuven
- Location: Leuven, Belgium

Holy Spirit College was one of the colleges of Leuven University, now listed as built heritage of Flanders, Belgium.

The college was founded in 1442 when Louis de Rycke gave the University a former brewery that he owned to house seven poor students of the Faculty of Theology. The gift was confirmed on 5 June 1445, and was extended in 1462 when de Rycke bequeathed his own house and garden to the college. Other donations followed until the college owned the whole block in which it was situated. Renovations began in the 16th century and continued throughout the college's history. The current appearance derives from 18th-century renovations.

When the French authorities confiscated the university buildings in 1797, the property was given to the city, which used it for a school. In 1835 it was leased back to the refounded university as a hall of residence for Theology students. The buildings were seriously damaged by allied bombing in May 1944. In 1948 the main building was listed as a protected monument. Reconstruction work was carried out 1950-1957.

== See also ==
- List of colleges of Leuven University
