= St Martin's Cathedral, Ypres =

Church in Ypres, Belgium

St Martin's Cathedral

Religion
- Affiliation: Roman Catholic
- Region: Diocese of Bruges
- Ecclesiastical or organisational status: proto-cathedral

Location
- Location: Ypres
- Interactive map of St Martin's Cathedral
- Coordinates: 50°51′6.5″N 2°53′6″E

Architecture
- Type: Cathedral
- Style: Gothic
- Groundbreaking: 1230
- Completed: 1370
- Height (max): 102 metres (335 ft)

St Martin's Church (Dutch: Sint-Maartenskerk), also called St Martin's Cathedral (Dutch: Sint-Maartenskathedraal), is a church and former cathedral in the Belgian city of Ypres. It was a cathedral and the seat of the former diocese of Ypres from 1561 to 1801, and is still commonly referred to as such. At 102 metres (335 ft) tall, it is among the tallest buildings in Belgium.

== History ==
Construction started on the church in 1230, and was finished in 1370. There had previously been a Romanesque church in the area, dating from the 10th or 11th century.

The diocese was originally part of the Diocese of Thérouanne, which had been established in the 7th or 8th century. In 1553 Charles V besieged the city of Thérouanne, then a French enclave in the Holy Roman Empire, in revenge for a defeat by the French at Metz. After he captured the city he razed it. In 1557, as a result of the war damage to its see, the diocese was abolished. This led to a reform of sees at the Council of Trent, and the bishopric of Thérouanne was split between the Diocese of Saint-Omer, the diocese of Boulogne and the Diocese of Ypres. With this, Saint Martin's Church was elevated to cathedral status, as it became the see of the new diocese.

In 1656 the secular and religious authorities of the then Spanish Netherlands destroyed the monument to Bishop Cornelius Jansen in St Martin's Cathedral – a symbolic act as part of the increasing persecution of Jansen's disciples, the Jansenists. As noted by Jonathan Israel many of the Ypres citizens were angry and distressed at this demolition.

After the Concordat of 1801 between Napoleon and Pope Pius VII, Ypres was incorporated into the diocese of Ghent, and Saint Martin's lost its status as a cathedral. As with many former cathedrals (proto-cathedrals), it is often still referred to as a cathedral by locals.

It was heavily damaged during the First World War. Subsequently (1922–1930) the ruin was cleared and the church was entirely rebuilt following the original plans, although the tower was built with a higher spire than the original.

== Tombs ==
Cornelius Jansen, the father of the theological movement Jansenism, was Bishop of Ypres from 1635 to 1638. He is buried in the cathedral. Count Robert III of Flanders, popularly known as The Lion of Flanders, is also buried in the cathedral.

== Gallery ==
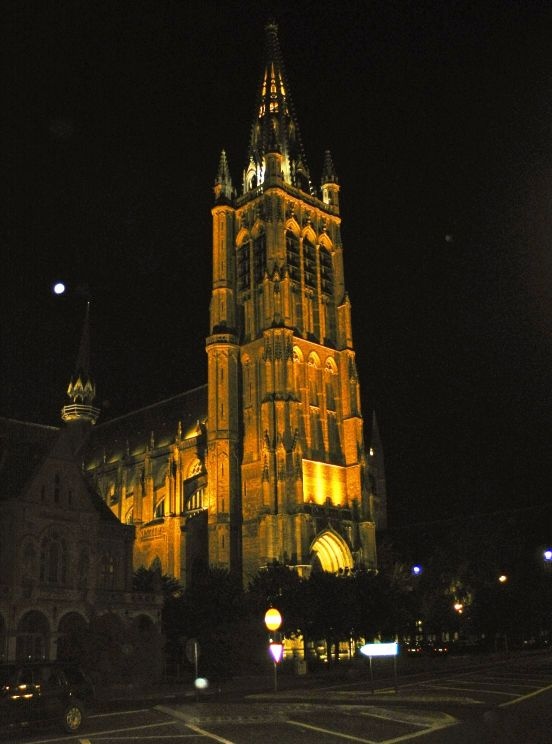
The church at night

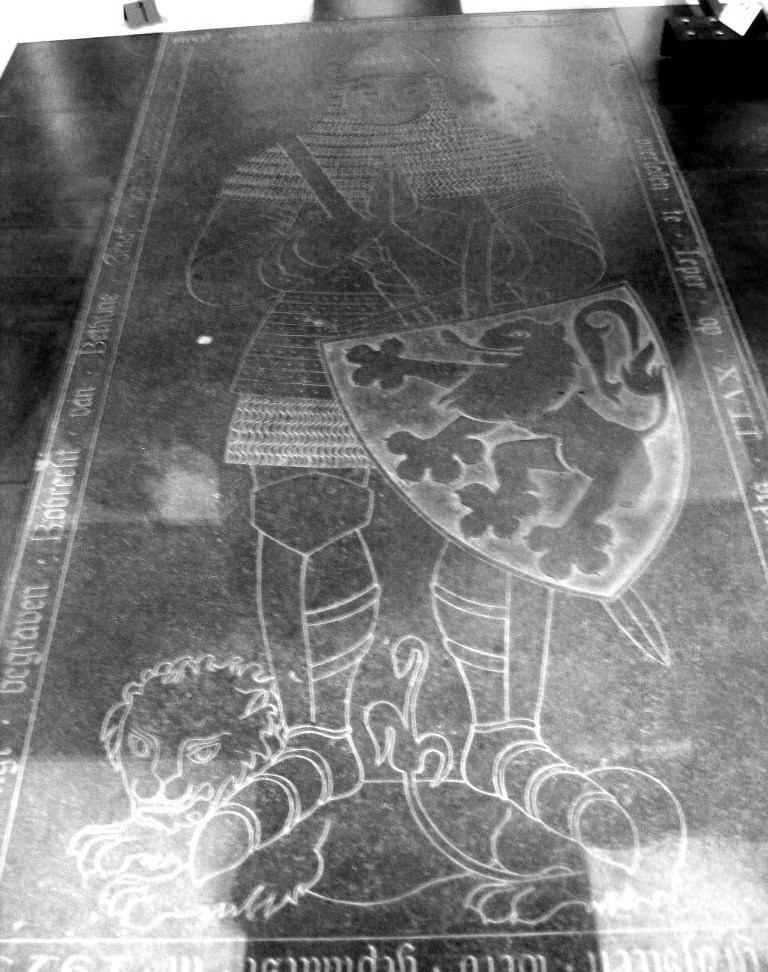
Tomb of Count Robert III of Flanders, popularly known as The Lion of Flanders

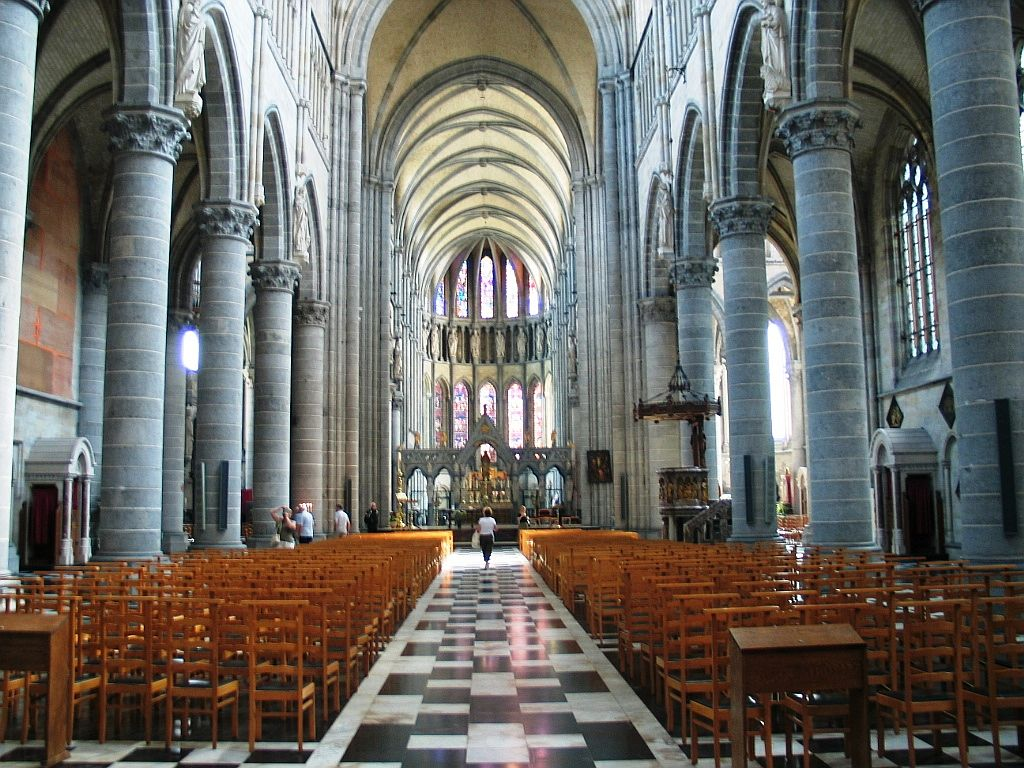
The interior of the church

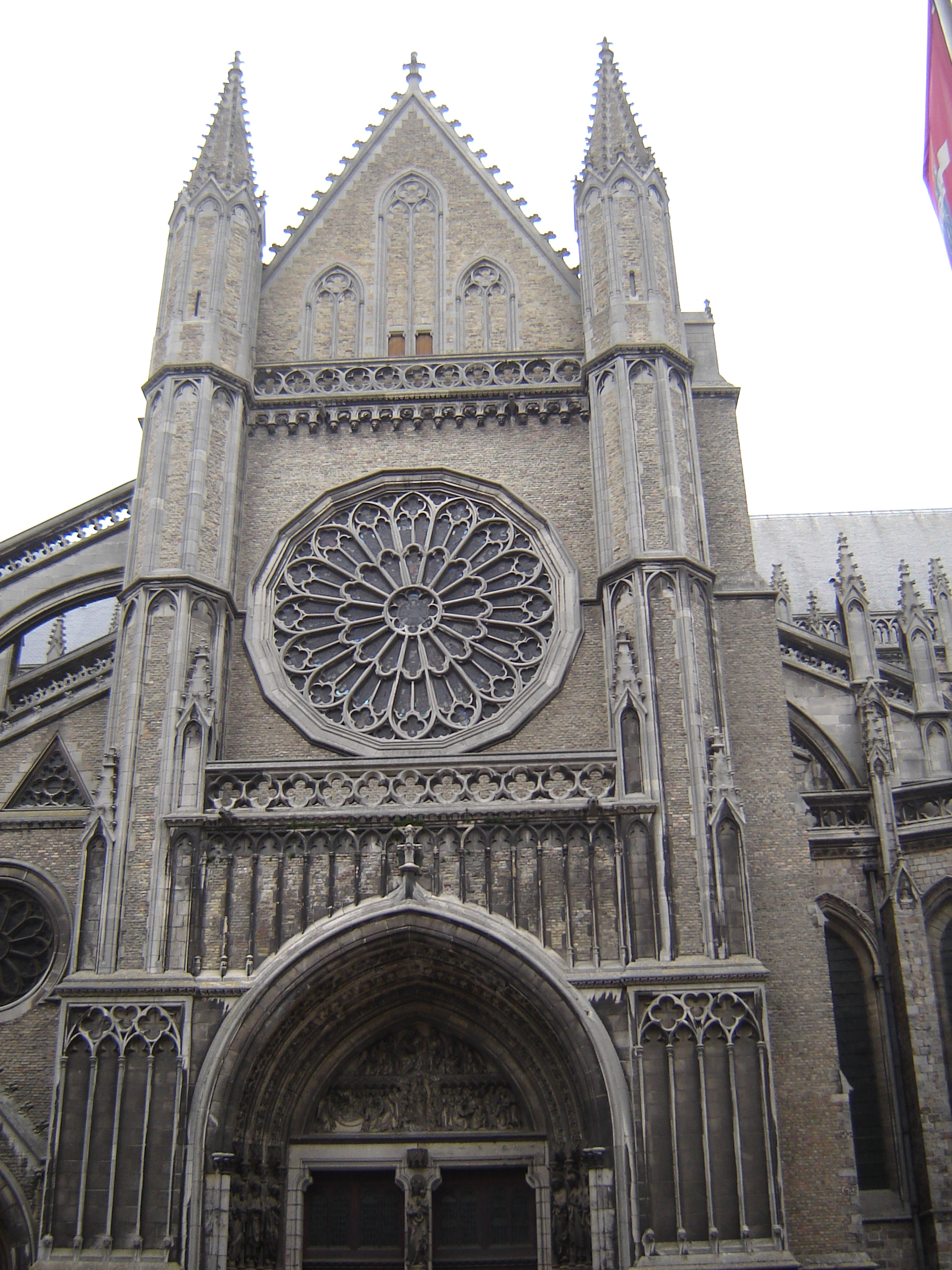
The facade of the side of the church
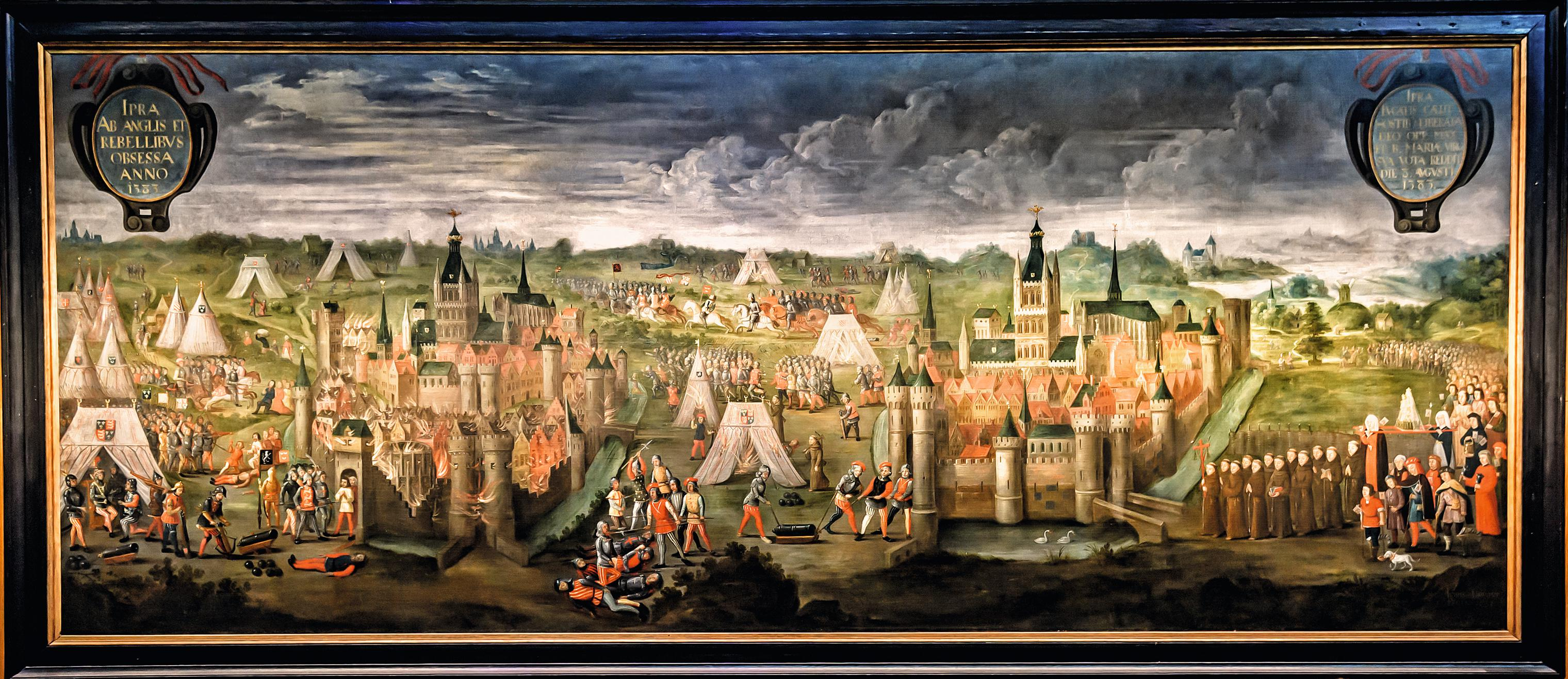
Siege of Ypres

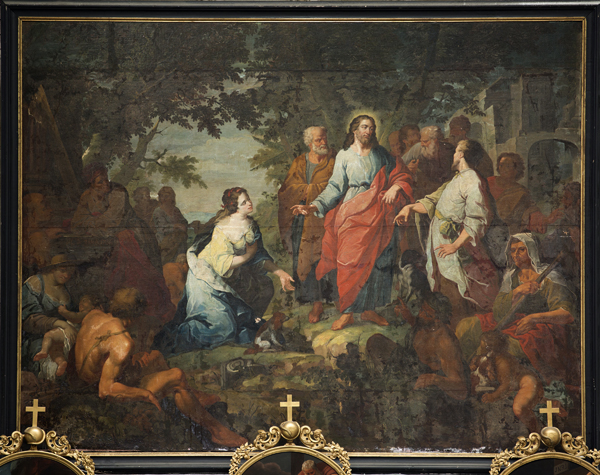
Jesus and the Samaritan woman (Matthijs De Visch)

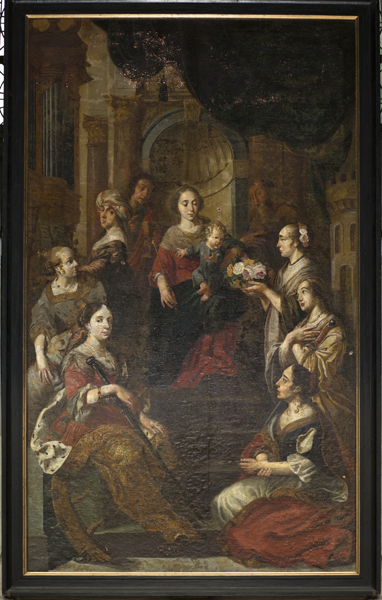
Maria (Victor Boucquet)

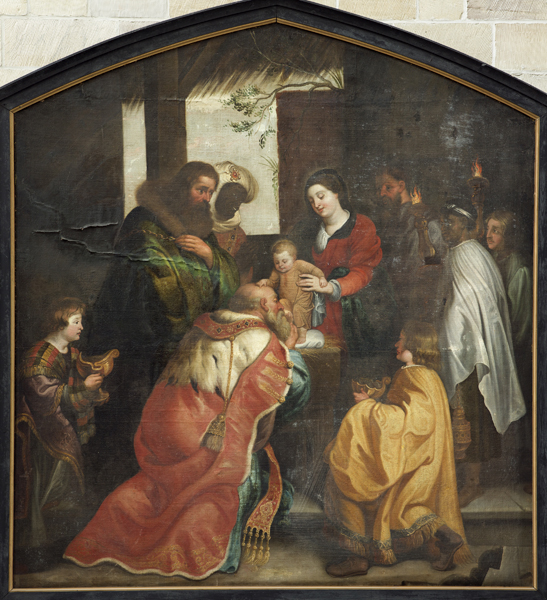
Adoration of the Magi

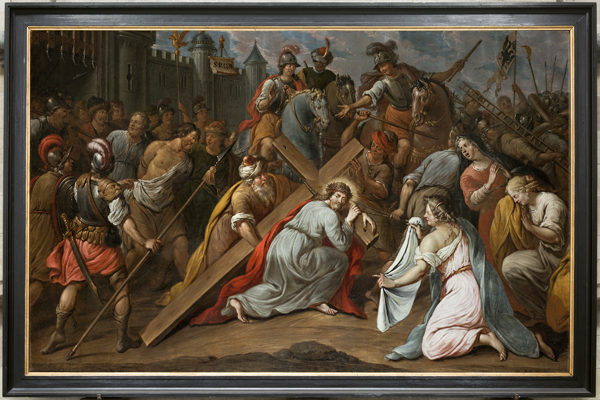
Bearing of the Cross

== See also ==
- List of tallest structures built before the 20th century
