= List of printers in the Southern Netherlands =

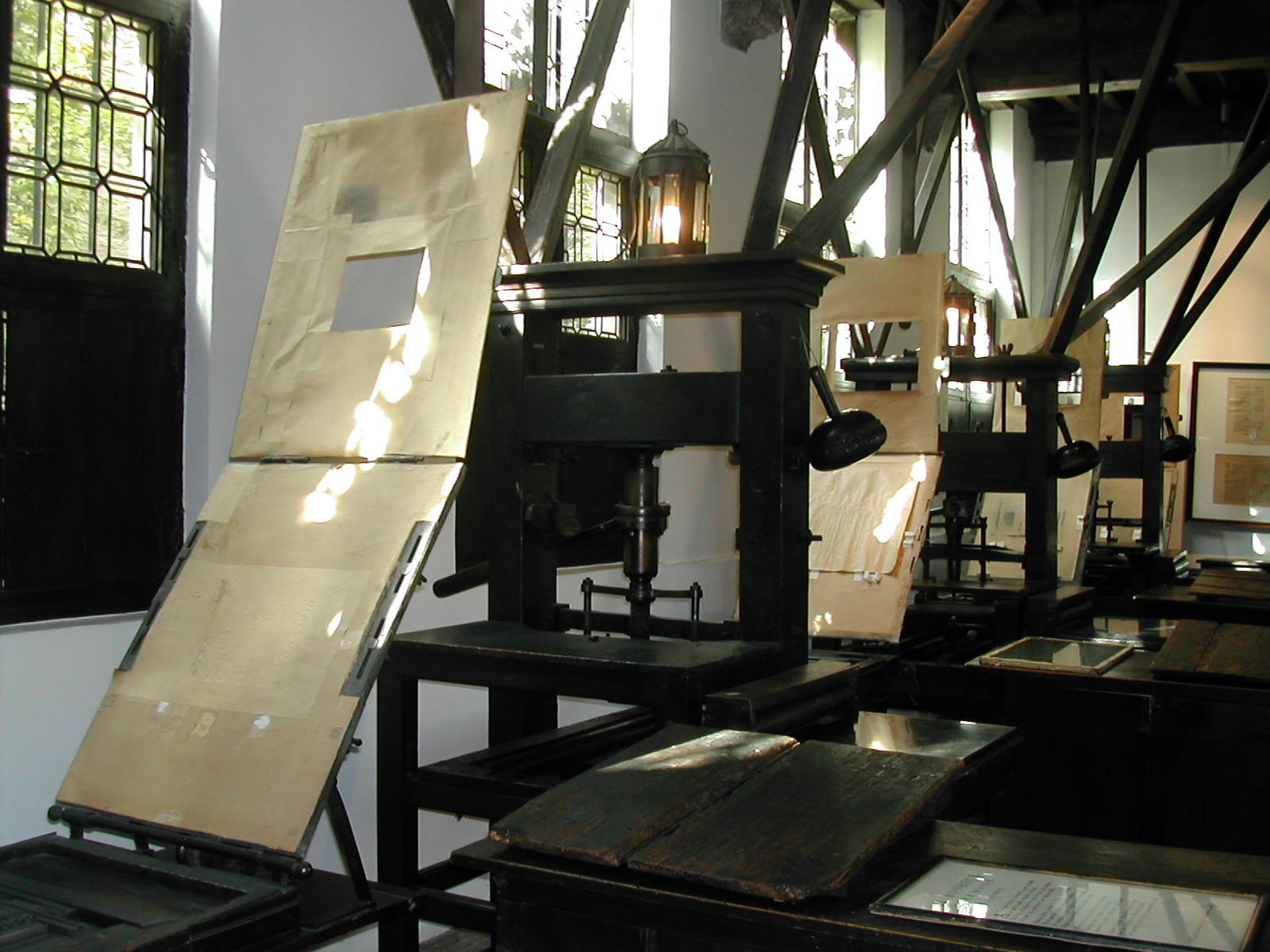
Printing room (anno 1570) of the Plantin-Moretus Museum, Antwerp, Belgium

During the handpress era (roughly 1450–1800), and especially in the 16th century, the Southern Netherlands (corresponding largely to what is now Belgium) was an international centre for the printing of books and images. There were printers in many of the towns, and some towns had many printers.

The laws of Charles V required all printers and booksellers to acquire a license in order to exercise their trade, a requirement that was in place through the subsequent period of Spanish rule. His son, Philip II of Spain, further ordered that the Antwerp printers enrol with the Guild of St Luke, adding another layer of control. The business records of one of the most important printing houses of the era, the Plantin Office in Antwerp, have remained intact, and are now the archive of the Plantin-Moretus Museum. As a result, the records of who was involved in printing are extremely accessible to historians and have been much studied.

This list is arranged alphabetically by town. Booksellers or print publishers who did not own a printing press but who commissioned printing under their own name are included. Some of the dates given are approximate. As of January 2015 the list is largely limited to printers who were active at some point during the rule of the Archdukes Albert and Isabella (1598–1621).

== Antwerp ==
Antwerp was the most important centre of printing in the Spanish Netherlands and had the best connections with international markets. The following printers and booksellers were active in Antwerp.

- Andreas Bacx, active 1578–1614
- Anthoni Ballo, active 1591–1618
- Balthazar Bellerus, active 1589; moved to Douai, active 1590–1634
- Joannes Bellerus, active 1553–1595
- Widow of Joannes Bellerus (Elisabeth Commers), active 1595–1616
- Lucas Bellerus, active 1574–1600
- Petrus Bellerus, active 1562–1600
- Gilles Beys, active 1590–1594; moved to Paris, active 1594–1595
- Jacob Bosselaer, active 1595–1608
- Peter de Cater, active 1585–1598; moved to Amsterdam, active 1601–1612
- François de Cauwe, active 1594–1610
- Hendrik de Clerck, active 1585–1597
- Joannes Cnobbaert, active 1620–1637
- Widow of Joannes Cnobbaert (Maria de Man), active 1637–1664
- Michiel Cnobbaert, active 1657–1689
- Hieronymus Cock, active 1548–1570
- Arnout Coninx, active 1579–1617
- Gillis Coppens van Diest, active 1573–1609
- Volcxken Diericx, active 1551–1600
- Gaspard Fleysben, active 1588
- Widow of John Fowler, active 1579–1586; moved to Douai, active 1586–1602
- Philip Galle, active 1564–1612
- Jan (III) van Ghelen, active 1577–1598; moved to Maastricht, active 1598–1605; moved to Rotterdam, active 1606–1610
- Joannes Grapheus, active 1520–1569
- Claes de Grave, active 1511–1540
- Michiel Hillen van Hoochstraten, c. 1476–1558
- Marten Huyssens, active 1582–1620
- Guislain Janssens, active 1587–1619
- Cornelis De Jode, active 1591–1600
- Gerard de Jode, active 1547–1591
- Jan van Keerbergen, active 1586–1624
- Merten de Keyser / Martin Lempereur, active 1525–1536
- Widow of Merten de Keyser, active 1536–1541
- Widow of Peter van Keerbergen, active 1592–1594
- Willem Lesteens, active 1612–1654
- Mynken Liefrink, active 1567–1593
- Hans van Liesvelt, active 1545–1564
- Jacob van Liesvelt, active 1513–1544
- Widow of Jacob van Liesvelt, active 1546–1566
- Herman Mersman, active 1572–1591
- Jacob Mesens, active 1592–1625
- Mattheus Mesens, active 1581–1595
- Gauthier Morberius, active 1553–1555; moved to Liège, active 1558–1595
- Jan Moretus, active 1589–1610
- François de Nus, active 1592–1593
- Martinus Nutius, father, son and grandson, active 1540–1638
- Philippus Nutius (printer), active 1564—1586
- Abraham Ortelius, active 1547–1598
- Widow of Willem van Parijs, active 1586–1595
- Petrus Phalesius the Elder, active 1581–1629
- Christopher Plantin, active 1548–1589
- Guillaume Rivière, active 1575–1584; moved to Arras, active 1591–1627
- Gerard Rivius, active 1598; moved to Leuven, active 1598–1625
- Mattheus van Roye, active 1560–1591
- Thomas Ruault, active 1591–1592
- Anthonis Spierinckx, active 1584–1616
- Gillis Steelsius, active 1570–1610
- Pauwels Stroobant, active 1596–1617
- Willem Stroobant, active 1592–1595 and 1610–1617; moved to Lille, active 1596–1598
- Gommarus Sulsenius, active 1594–1625
- Hendrik Swingen, active 1587–1601
- Ameet Tavernier, active 1583–1593
- Artus Tavernier, active 1580; moved to Salamanca, active 1604–1615
- Antheunis Thielens, active 1564–1596
- Peter van Tongheren, active 1580–1602
- Caesar Joachim Trognaesius, active 1624–1645
- Joachim Trognaesius, active 1583–1620
- Hieronymus Verdussen, active 1579–1635
- Abraham Verhoeven, active 1605–1632
- Daniel Vervliet, active 1564–1610
- Widow of Jan Verwithagen, active 1588–1592
- Jan Verwithagen the younger, active 1588–1599
- Willem Vorsterman, active 1504–1542
- Jan Baptist Vrients, active 1575–1611
- Gerard van Wolschaten, active 1596–1634
- Hendrik Wouters, active 1571–1592

== Arras ==
- Guillaume de la Rivière, active 1591–1634

== Ath ==
- Joannes Masius le jeune, active 1590–1622

== Bruges ==
- Nicolaes Breyghel, active 1624–1663
- Hubrecht Croock, active 1520–1554
- Widow of Hubrecht Croock (Catharina de Bondue), active 1554–1557
- Anthonis Janssuene, active 1584–1619

== Brussels ==
- Hubert Anthoon, active 1598–1630
- Widow of Michiel van Hamont, active 1585–1587
- Pierre de La Tombe, active 1558–1595
- Jan Mommaert, active 1585–1627
- Jean Pepermans, active 1620–1633
- Robrecht Phalesius, active 1577–1595
- Jan Reyns, active 1598–1609
- Pieter Simons, active 1598–1610
- Jean Thimon, active 1573–1609
- Rutger Velpius, active 1585–1614

== Douai ==
- Balthazar Bellerus, active 1590–1634
- Jean Bogard, active 1572–1627
- John Fowler, active 1577–1578
- Widow of John Fowler, active 1586–1602
- John Heigham, active 1603–1613; moved to St Omer, active 1613–1634
- Laurence Kellam, active 1604–1613
- John Lion, active 1580–1603

== Ghent ==
- Joos vanden Kerckhove, active 1595–1604
- Gauthier Manilius, active 1574–1626
- Jan van Salensen, active 1580–1623
- Jan van den Steene, active 1576–1625
- Joos vander Straeten, active 1606–1610

== Kortrijk ==
- Joos vander Straeten, active 1592–1606; moved to Ghent, active 1606–1610

== Leuven ==
- Joannes Bogardus, active 1556–1567; moved to Douai, active 1572–1627
- Franciscus Fabri, active 1590–1605
- John Fowler, active 1565–1574; moved to Douai, active 1577–1578
- Jacob Heyberghs, active 1567–1596
- Laurence Kellam, active 1597–1600; moved to Valenciennes, active 1601–1603; moved to Douai, active 1604–1613
- John Lion, active 1579–1580; moved to Douai, active 1580–1603
- Joannes Masius the elder, active 1567–1616
- Pierre Phalèse the Elder, active 1545–1575
- Pierre Phalèse the Younger, active 1570–1578; moved to Antwerp, active 1581–1629
- Gerard Rivius, active 1598–1625
- Andreas Sassenus, active 1557–1610
- Servatius Sassenus, active 1557–1596
- Rutger Velpius, active 1565–1580; moved to Mons, active 1580–1584; moved to Brussels, active 1585–1614
- Nicolaes Wouters, active 1595–1598
- Joannes Baptista Zangrius, active 1595–1599
- Petrus Zangrius, active 1585–1610
- Jacobus Zegers, active 1631–1644

== Liège ==
- Arnold de Corswarem, active 1598–1632
- Jean de Glen, active 1597–1631
- Jacques Grégoire, active 1595–1596
- Pierre de Heer, active 1581–1594
- Henricus Hovius, active 1567–1611
- Nicolas Ingelbert, active 1587–1609
- Lambert de La Coste, active 1589–1609
- Gauthier Morberius, active 1558–1595
- Jasper Ostreman, active 1594
- Christian Ouwerx the elder, active 1581–1612
- Gerard Rivius, active 1592–1597; moved to Antwerp, active 1598; moved to Leuven, active 1598–1625
- Léonard Streel, active 1593–1653
- Jean Voes, active 1590–1599
- Widow of Jean Voes, active 1599–1601

== Lier ==
- Pieter Simons, active 1616–1617

== Lille ==
- Christophe Beys, active 1610–1645
- Pierre de Rache, active 1612–1648
- Pieter Simons, active 1589–1598; moved to Brussels, active 1598–1610
- Willem Stroobant, active 1596–1598; moved to Antwerp, active 1610–1617
- Antoine Tack, active 1594–1595

== Luxembourg ==
- Hubertus Reulandt, active 1618–1639; moved to Trier, active 1640–1661

== Mechelen ==
- Jan van Campenhout, active 1585–1643
- Henry Jaye, active 1617–1639

== Mons ==
- Charles Michel, active 1579–1627
- Rutger Velpius, active 1580–1584; moved to Brussels, active 1585–1614

== Namur ==
- François Vivien, active 1597–1628

== St Omer ==
- English College Press, 1607–1759
- John Heigham, active 1613–1634

== Tournai ==
- Nicolas Laurent, active 1580–1617

== Sources ==
- Fernand Danchin, Les Imprimés lillois: Répertoire bibliographique de 1594 à 1815, vol. 1 (Lille, 1926)
- Jules Houdoy, Les Imprimeurs lillois: Bibliographie des impressions lilloises, 1595–1700 (Paris, 1879; reprinted Geneva, 1971)
- Frans M. A. Robben, Jan Poelman, boekverkoper en vertegenwoordiger van de firma Plantin-Moretus in Salamanca, 1579–1607 (Antwerp, 1994)
- Anne Rouzet, Dictionnaire des imprimeurs, libraires et éditeurs des XVe et XVIe siècles dans les limites géographiques de la Belgique actuelle (Nieuwkoop, 1975). ISBN 978-90-6004-322-6.
- Leon Voet, The Golden Compasses: The History of the House of Plantin-Moretus (2 vols., Amsterdam, London and New York, 1969–1972)
- General Willems, Le Livre, l'estampe, l'édition en Brabant du XVe au XIXe siècle (Gembloux, 1935)
