= Anna Bijns =

Flemish poet (1493 – 1575)

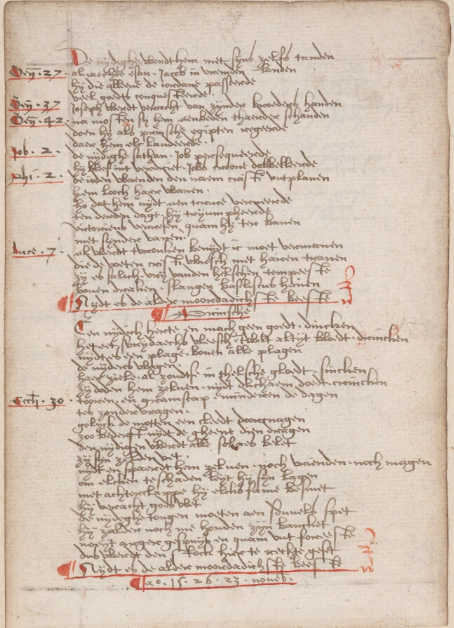
Poem by Anna Bijns from a manuscript in the Ghent University Library, 1520s

Anna Bijns or Anna Byns (1493 in Antwerp – 1575 in Antwerp) was a Flemish poet who wrote in the Dutch language. She was an educator and the administrator of a primary school in Antwerp until the age of 80. Even while as a woman she was denied membership of a local chamber of rhetoric, she was able to publish her works and find widespread recognition for her literary talent among her contemporaries. She is the first author in Dutch-language literature who mainly owed her success to the recently invented printing press. Her works were reprinted multiple times during her lifetime. In the religious conflicts of her time she chose the side of the Catholic Church and expressed in her poems sharp criticism of the teachings of Martin Luther. She is also known for her verses criticising the institution of marriage.

== Life ==
She was the eldest child of Jan Bijns Lambertsz. Bijns and Lijsbeth Vooch. Her father was a stocking maker and a member of a local Chamber of rhetoric. This was a society of lovers of literature common in the Low Countries, which organised poetry recitations and staged theatre performances. Her father is known to have composed at least one refrain, which has been preserved. It is likely her father who awakened Anna's interest in poetry.

After Anna's birth her parents had two more children: a daughter Margriete born in 1495 and a son Maarten born in 1497. Her father died in 1516. A year later her sister got married. She and her brother claimed their father's inheritance. Widow Bijns then had to sell the family home and the shop's inventory. Afterwards, the remaining family members settled in a house called "De Patiencie" in the Keizerstraat, which the mother had purchased from her part of the inheritance. In that house, Anna's brother Maarten started a school. Anna helped with the school in addition to caring for her mother. After the death of their mother in 1530, brother and sister continued to live together. When Maarten got married in 1536, there was a conflict over the distribution of the inheritance which ended up in court. The court decided that Anna would be allowed to receive the rent on the family's properties, but would not inherit any further real estate. She continued collecting the rent, managing the houses, and contacting the tenants as she did before the conflict with her brother. She was forced to leave for a smaller house, "Het Roosterken", opposite her old address, which was provided to her by the chaplain of the Cathedral of Antwerp. There, at the age of 43, she started her own school and became a member of the local teachers' guild. The school was located in a small space and only catered for a small number of children. It provided primary education: reading, writing, catechism and some arithmetic.

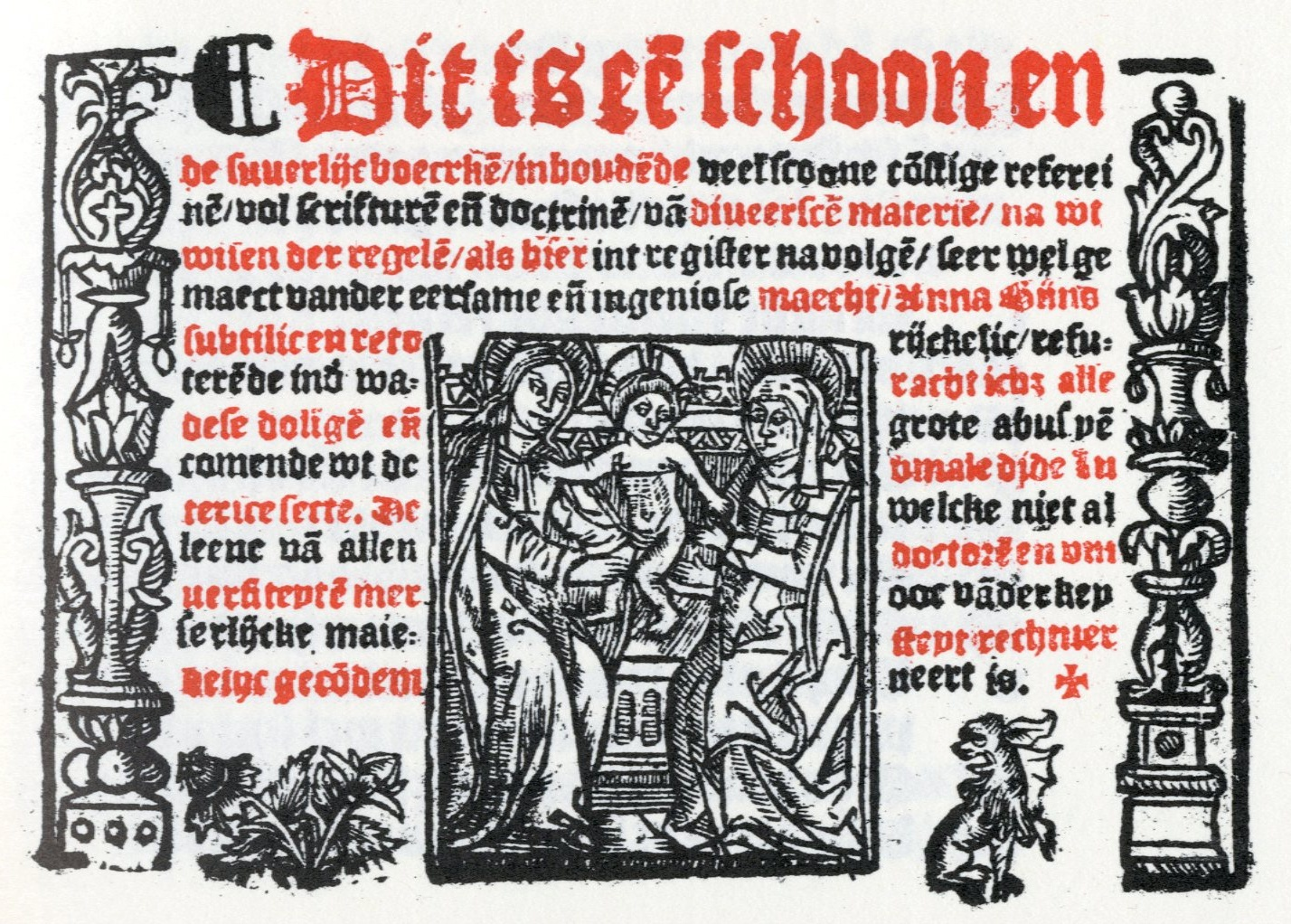
Title page of the Schoon ende suverlick boecxken, 1528

Bijns developed strong ties with the Franciscan friars in Antwerp. She dedicated a number of refrains to one of those friars known by his first name Bonaventura. He has since been identified with Bonaventura Vorsel, who was also Bijns' confessor. Some authors have surmised, without evidence, that the unrequited love about which Bijns writes in some of her refrains was directed at Bonaventura. Many of her acquaintances were members of the Franciscan order or connected to it in some way. Bijns herself likely did not belong to a religious community and there is no evidence that she was a nun or beguine. It has been speculated that much of Bijns' work was created at the instigation of the Antwerp Franciscans. They likely also put her in contact with printers. Brother Matthias Weijnssen, in particular, is believed to have encouraged and guided her in her writing. Bijns' anti-Lutheranism fitted perfectly in the Franciscans' own propaganda war against Luther's teachings which they waged through literature in the vernacular.

Bijns continued to run her school until 1573 when she decided to close the school and sell her house. She sold the house to the Stollaert couple, who owned the house next to her in the Keizerstraat. De Stollaerts agreed that Bijns could come and live with them in the Lange Nieuwstraat. In exchange for board and lodging, Bijns gave all her money to the Stollaert family. Anna Bijns died, at the age of 82, in the Easter week of 1575.

== Work ==
Anna Bijns wrote refreinen (refrains), a specific form of poem that was popular with the rhetoricians of her time. Refrains deal with three themes: love (called 'het amoureuze'), wisdom (called 'het vroede') and the crazy or comical (called 'het zotte'). Love refrains deal with various aspects of amorous relationships, wisdom refrains deal with (other) serious subjects, often of a religious nature while crazy refrains are comical and often reflect the era's crass humor. Anna Bijns covered all three themes in her refrains.

As a poetry form, the "refrain" was derived from the French ballad. The most important characteristics of a refrain are that the poem has at least four verses and that the last line of each verse always returns as a refrain. This returning line is usually used as the title for the poem. The last verse is dedicated to a so-called 'prince', the leader of the local chamber of rhetoric. Even though every last line should begin with the word 'prince', it does not necessarily mean that this refers to the then incumbent president of the chamber. Religious refrains may also address God or Christ as 'prince' or Mary as 'princess'. The poets of that time loved to play with language and use creative rhymes. They used the end rhyme (with the paired or crossed rhyme as the simplest form) as well as rhymes within verses. In addition, they often included acrostics in their verse, where the poet's name or the name of another person is interwoven with the text. Acrostics are useful to identify the person involved in the poem. Bijns also makes frequent use of it.

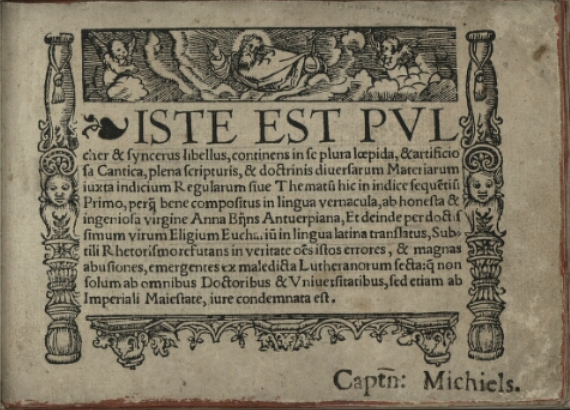
Title page of the Latin version of the Refereinen, 1529

The oeuvre of Bijns has been transmitted through three poetry collections published in Antwerp in respectively 1528, 1548 and 1567 and through unpublished manuscripts. Her first book was published by the Antwerp printer Jacob van Liesvelt with a very long title: "Dit is een schoon ende suverlijc boecxken / inhoudende veel scoone constige refereinen / vol scrifturen ende doctrinen / van diveerscen materien / na uutwisen der regelen / als hier int register na volgen / seer wel gemaect vander eersame ende ingeniose maecht / Anna Bijns subtilic en retorijckelic / refuterende inder warachticheit alle dese dolingen ende grote abusyen comende uut de vermaledide Lutersce secte. De welcke niet alleene van allen doctoren ende universiteyten mer ooc vander keyserlijcke maiesteyt rechtverdelijc gecondemneert is" (This is a beautiful and sincere book / containing many beautiful and artful refrains / full of scriptures and doctrines / on various topics / after banning the rules / as are set out in the index below / very well made by the honorable and ingenious maiden / Anna Bijns subtly and rhetorically / refuting in truthfulness all those errors and great mistakes coming from the damned Lutheran sect, which have been justly condemned not only by all doctors and universities, but also by his imperial majesty). The book contains 23 refrains by Bijns. The title seems to indicate that they are all anti-Lutheran in nature but in reality the anti-Lutheran content only appears in a number of refrains. The book can be understood as Bijns' reaction to the teachings of Martin Luther which were spreading rapidly throughout Europe after Luther's publication of the Ninety-five Theses in Wittenberg in 1517. Bijns is known to have drafted her two oldest refrains criticizing Luther in 1522 and 1523. Both appear in her first book. Only two copies of the first edition of her first published work have been preserved: one in the Royal Library of Belgium in Brussels and the second in the City Library of Maastricht. The two copies are not identical as they contain differences in spelling and in a number of the marginalia. This has been explained by the fact that the book sold so well that it had to be published a second time, perhaps in a great hurry, so that a colophon with the exact same date was copied.

The book's success was also evidenced by the fact that the Ghent priest and humanist Eligius Eucharius translated the entire book into Latin. This translation was published only one year after the original by the press of Willem Vorsterman. Eucharius also added a short preface, or actually a poem ('carmen'). The Dutch language version was reprinted by Willem Vorsterman in 1541.

A second (actually third) reprint was published by Maarten Nuyts around 1548. The date is not entirely clear as neither the title page nor the colophon indicates a date. Most of the surviving copies (three out of five) of the Nuyts reprint of the first book are bound together with his edition of the second book. The dating of that bundle is derived from the printer's privilege from the second bundle which was dated 17 November 1548. Nuyts added to the beginning of the title of the first printed book of Bijns the words "yerste boeck" (the first book) without changing the remainder of the title.

Nuyts published the second book of Anna Bijns with the title: "Het tweede Boeck vol schoone ende constighe Refereynen / vol scrifturen ende leeringhen / van menigherhande saken / na uutwijsen der regulen die hier int register navolghen / seer subtijlijck ende Rethorijckelijck ghemaeckt vander eersame ende verstandighe maecht Anna Bijns / seer treflijck straffende alle Ketterijen ende dolinghen van desen onsen tijde" ((This is the second book full of beautiful and artful refrains / full of scriptures and doctrines / on various matters / after banning the rules as are set out here in the index below / very subtly and rhetorically made by the honorable and ingenious maiden Anna Bijns / very aptly castizing all heresies and errors of our time). The second book contains mainly anti-Lutheran refrains. They are again twenty-three refrains from Bijns, to which is added one refrain made by Stevijn vanden Gheenste, an admirer of Bijns who praises her in his poem for her fight against Luther. Jan van Ghelen reprinted the second book in circa 1553. He also printed the now fourth (fifth) edition of the first book in 1564. A year later, the second book was also reprinted. That was the third known edition of this book.

In 1567, Peeter van Keerberghe published the first edition of the third book of Bijns under the title "Een seer scoon ende suyver boeck, verclarende die mogentheyt Gods, ende Christus ghenade, over die sondighe menschen. Daer boven die warachtighe, oorsake vander plaghen groot die wy voor ooghen sien, met veel scoone vermaninghe, totter duecht, bewijsende dat een oprecht gheloove, met een nieu leven in Christo is, den rechten wech. Om Gods toorn van ons te keeren / hier pays te vercrighen / ende hiernamaels het eewich leven / ghemaect met grooter const / door die eerwerdige Godvruchtige Catholijcke / ende ser vermaerde maghet Anna Bijns / in den oprechten Gheest Christi / seer hooghe verlicht woonende binnen Anwerpen / en die Jonckheyt instruerende in het oprechte Catholijck gheloove" ('A very beautiful and sincere book, explaining the power of God, and Christ's grace with respect to the sinful people. Further, the true cause of the great plagues that we are confronted with, including many beautiful admonitions to virtue, proving that a true faith, with a new life in Christ, is the correct way. To turn God's wrath from us / obtain peace here / and eternal life in the hereafter / made with great artfulness / by that honorable god-fearing Catholic / and very famous maiden Anna Bijns / who in the true spirit of Christ / lives very enlightened in Antwerp / and who teaches young people the true Catholic faith'). It is clear from the title that the author intended the book to have a devotional purpose. It praises the omnipotence of God and the grace of Christ and at the same time encourages its readers to change their ways by acting virtuously to combat the problems (plagues) with which they are confronted. These problems are stated to be caused by the failure of people to live according to God's law. The strident anti-Lutheranism of the first two books has made room for an attention to devotion. The third book has 70 refrains by Bijns which detail how the readers can regain God's grace. The refrains are deeply religious.

In the 17th century there were numerous reprints of the published works of Anna Bijns sometimes with slightly different titles. Some of her refrains were included in other publications or printed on separate sheets. There were also printed sheets of her works that were not included in her three printed books.

In addition to the three printed books of refrains, the poetry of Anna Bijns has been handed down through 18 manuscripts. Of these, 17 are collective manuscripts in which Bijns' work is featured alongside that of other authors. The only exception to this is manuscript B in the Ghent University Library (signature: Ghent, UB, 2166) that only contains work by Anna Bijns. The refrains in these manuscripts span a period from before the first publication of her work until the period 1545 and cover a wider area of themes than the printed refrains.

== Themes ==
Her work consists of religious and moralizing poems, polemic refrains against Martin Luther, whom she considered an instrument of evil, love poems and various satires. The best-known thematic group is made up of virulently anti-Lutheran refrains, in which Luther and his followers are severely denounced as liars, cheats, seducers and earthly devils. The poems are emotional and testify to the hatred, as well as the fear Catholics felt for the perceived threat of Protestantism. The second thematic group of refrains are also anti-Lutheran in their intention, but differ from the first as they rely on theological arguments rather than invective to combat Lutheranism. They are referred to as the theological reasoning refrains and are characterized by their lower level of emotionality.

A third different thematic is the group of complaints about the present time. This is an old genre adopted by Bijns. This group contains refrains in which she expresses her grievances about the state of the world and denounces all kinds of wrongs without referring to Lutheranism. This group expands from the premise that everything used to be better, especially as contemporary people no longer live as piously and virtuously as before while they fail at the same time to recognise the error of their ways. Bijns' criticism in these verses is not aimed at Luther or other non-Catholics, but every person of her time.

The fourth thematic group is that of the refrains with theological advice in which Bijns advises her readers on what they should do in view of the sorry state of the world. The prevalent trust of this group is the need to protect potential victims by preparing them for possible attacks and by recommending a certain course of action to them. She emphasizes the church commandments on fasting and confession. Only a few of these refrains are anti-Lutheran as they focus more on the salvation of souls. The fifth group is that of the refrains of praise. These include refrains of praise for Mary and Christ. They show the piety of Bijns and her trust in Catholic doctrine. Here Bijns shows how well she masters the register of laudatory metaphors and other imagery for Mary. Every refrain is imbued with veneration and devotion. These first five groups all appear in the first volume of refrains.

In her other works, there are two further thematic groups: the foolish and the love refrains. The first consists of refrains relating to events taking place in monasteries. They poke fun at the monks who were expected to live a holy life but often fail to behave according to their monastic rules and often display coarse humour. The refrains are effective by showing that the respectable monks and nuns are just ordinary people with their weaknesses. A second foolish category is that of the mockery of marriage. They recount in detail the many disadvantages of marriage and highlight how much better it is to remain celibate. While these refrains are extremely funny Bijns also wrote them with a didactic goal in mind: she wanted to show that those who are unmarried can dedicate their lives entirely to God. A final group consists of amorous poems, in which Bijns concentrates on the genre of the love complaints in which the first person complains about being abandoned by his or her loved one and wonders what to do next.

== Editions of Anna Bijns' work ==
- Dit is ee[n] schoon ende suuerlijc boecxken[n], inhoude[n]de veel scoone co[n]stige refereinen[n], vol scrifture[n] en[de] doctrine[n] va[n] diueersce[n] materie[n] ... seer wel gemaect vander eersame ... maecht Anna Bijns ('This is a beautiful and pure booklet containing many beautiful and artful refrains full of texts and doctrines on various matters made by the honorable and ingenious maiden Anna Bijns'), Published by Jacob van Liesvelt, Antwerp, 1528).
- Refereinen van Anna Bijns: naar de nalatenschap van A. Bogaers (Refrains), three collections of poems by Anna Bijns published in 1528, 1548 and 1567, Willem Lodewijk Helten, J. H. Dunk, 1875.
- Refereinen (Refrains), A. Bogaers e.a. ed. (Rotterdam 1875).
- Nieuwe refereinen van Anna Bijns (New Refrains), W.J.A. Jonckbloet e.a. ed. (Gent 1886).
- Onuitgegeven gedichten (Unpublished poems), A. Soens, ed. Leuvensche Bijdragen 4 (1902) 199-368.
- Schoon ende suverlijc boecxken, L. Roose ed. 2 delen (Leuven 1987) [facsimile editie].
- ’t Is al vrouwenwerk (It is all the work of women). Refreinen, H. Pleij ed. (Amsterdam 1987).
- A few poems by Anna Bijns translated into English by Kristiaan Arcke (p 160) in Women's Writing from the Low Countries 1200-1875: A Bilingual Anthology on Google books, by Lia van Gemert, Hermina Joldersma, Olga van Marion, Dieuwke van der Poel, Riek Schenkerveld-van der Dussen, ISBN 978-90-8964-129-8
