= Jan Verwithagen =

Printer in Southern Netherlands

Jan Verwithagen (also known as Joannes Withagius; Zoersel, circa 1526 – Antwerp, 1587) was a printer and publisher in Antwerp in the 16th century, known for his work in both religious and scientific publications. As a member of the Guild of Saint Luke and a royal book printer, Verwithagen held a prominent position in the city's intellectual and commercial life.

== Background ==
Jan Verwithagen had been working independently as a printer since at least 1549, developing his expertise over more than three decades. In 1556, he settled in Antwerp as a printer and joined the Guild of Saint Luke, the organization regulating the city's printing trade. This affiliation granted him access to a network of intellectuals and established him as a respected figure in the printing industry. Over the course of his career, Verwithagen produced a wide array of works, ranging from Catholic theological treatises to classical literature and scientific publications. His appointment as a royal book printer brought him significant commissions from the Spanish authorities, which allowed him to influence the spread of religious and political ideas associated with the Counter-Reformation. One of his most notable collaborations was with the renowned Antwerp printer Christoffel Plantin, particularly during the years 1568–1573, when Plantin's printing house was under immense pressure due to the demand for prestigious projects such as the Antwerp Polyglot .

== Publications ==
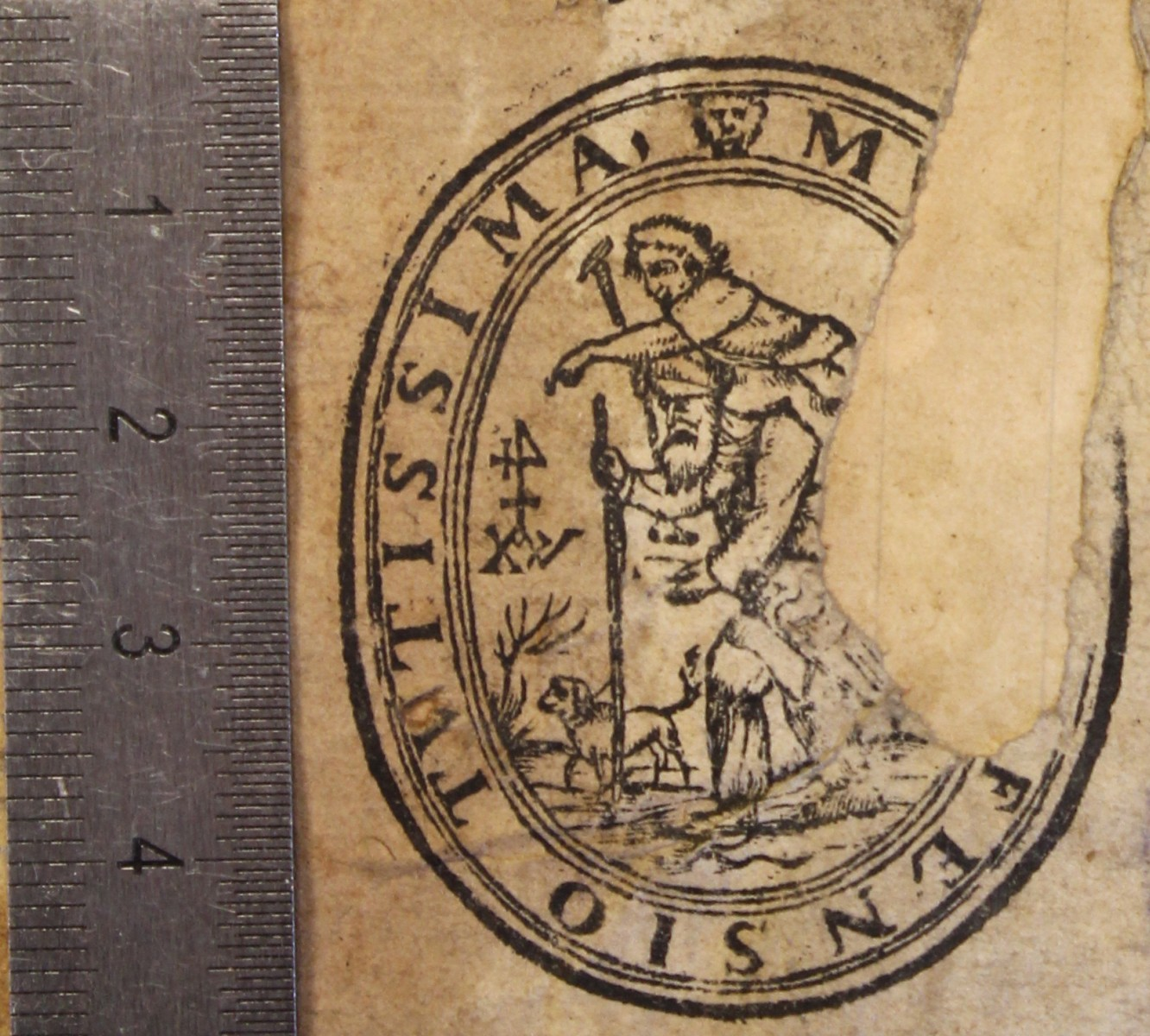
Printing label of Jan Verwithagen

Verwithagen's printing house was notably versatile in its offerings. A substantial part of his output consisted of religious publications endorsing Catholic doctrine, such as Theologia Lutheranae epitome (1555), an attack on Lutheran theology, and Confessio catholica fidei christianae (1561), which defended Catholic doctrine.

In addition, Verwithagen printed a number of classical and humanist works, such as Vergil’s Bucolica (1552) and Erasmus’s letters (1553).

Another important aspect of Verwithagen’s work was his production of scientific and practical publications, including Cosmographia by Petrus Apianus, a famous work on geography and navigation.

== Death ==
Jan Verwithagen died around 1587, shortly after the Siege of Antwerp in 1585.

== Legacy ==
After Jan Verwithagen’s death, his widow and son continued the printing business under the name “Withagius, vidua” (Widow of Withagen). During this period, publications shifted more toward practical and educational works, such as financial manuals and arithmetic books.

== Notable publications ==
- Vergilius, Bucolica (1552).
- Theologia Lutheranae epitome (1555).
- Confessio catholica fidei christianae (1561).
- Petrus Apianus, Cosmographia Petri Apiani (1561,1564, 1573, 1574, 1575, 1581, 1584).

== See also ==
- List of printers in the Southern Netherlands
