= Fasciculus mirre =

Germanic devotional book

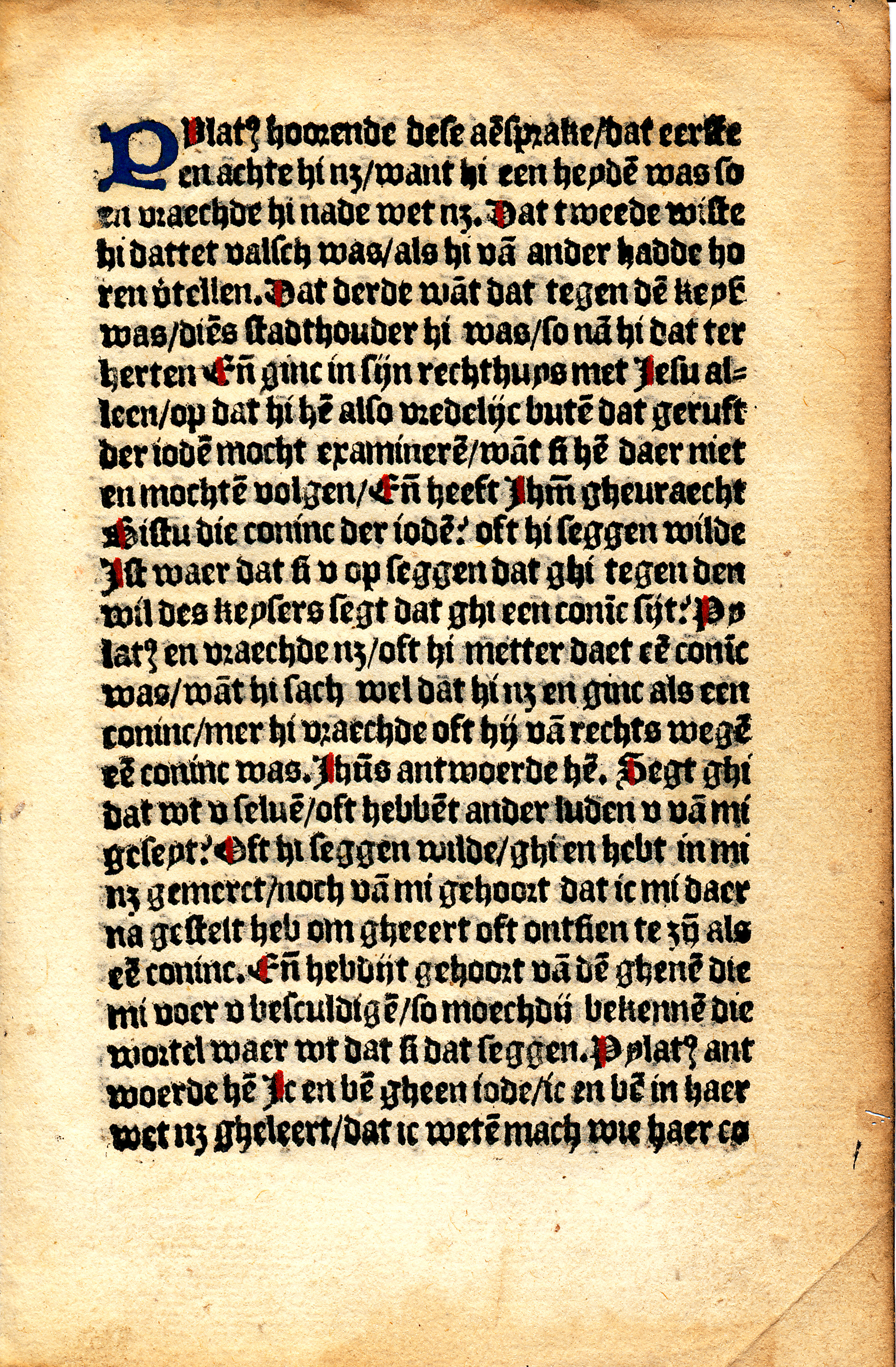
Leaf from Fasciculus mirre. Containing 26 lines in Middle Dutch, this leaf measures 14 centimeters in length and 9 centimeters in width. Printed using Gothic script by Roelant Bollaert in Delft, 1500.

Fasciculus mirre is a Germanic devotional book that was popular in the Low Countries during the first half of the sixteenth century. The text contains meditations on the life of Jesus Christ, most notably the Passion. Its Latin title (meaning "a bundle of myrrh" in English) comes from the first chapter of Canticum Canticorum: "Fasciculus Myrrhae dilectus meus mihi inter ubera mea commorabituris." Fasciculus mirre is often sometimes spelled as Fasciculus myrre, or myrrhæ, and can also be referred to by an English title, On the Life of Christ. The earliest known printed version dates to approximately 1500 CE in the Dutch city of Delft.

== Background ==
Fasciculus mirre was first compiled by an anonymous Franciscan in the German city of Cologne, although the exact date of its original composition is unknown. During a time when Europe was on the eve of the Protestant Reformation, the pocket-sized text was convenient for those who could carry it around with them everywhere, reading it throughout the day and embracing the spiritual power it was believed to have embodied.

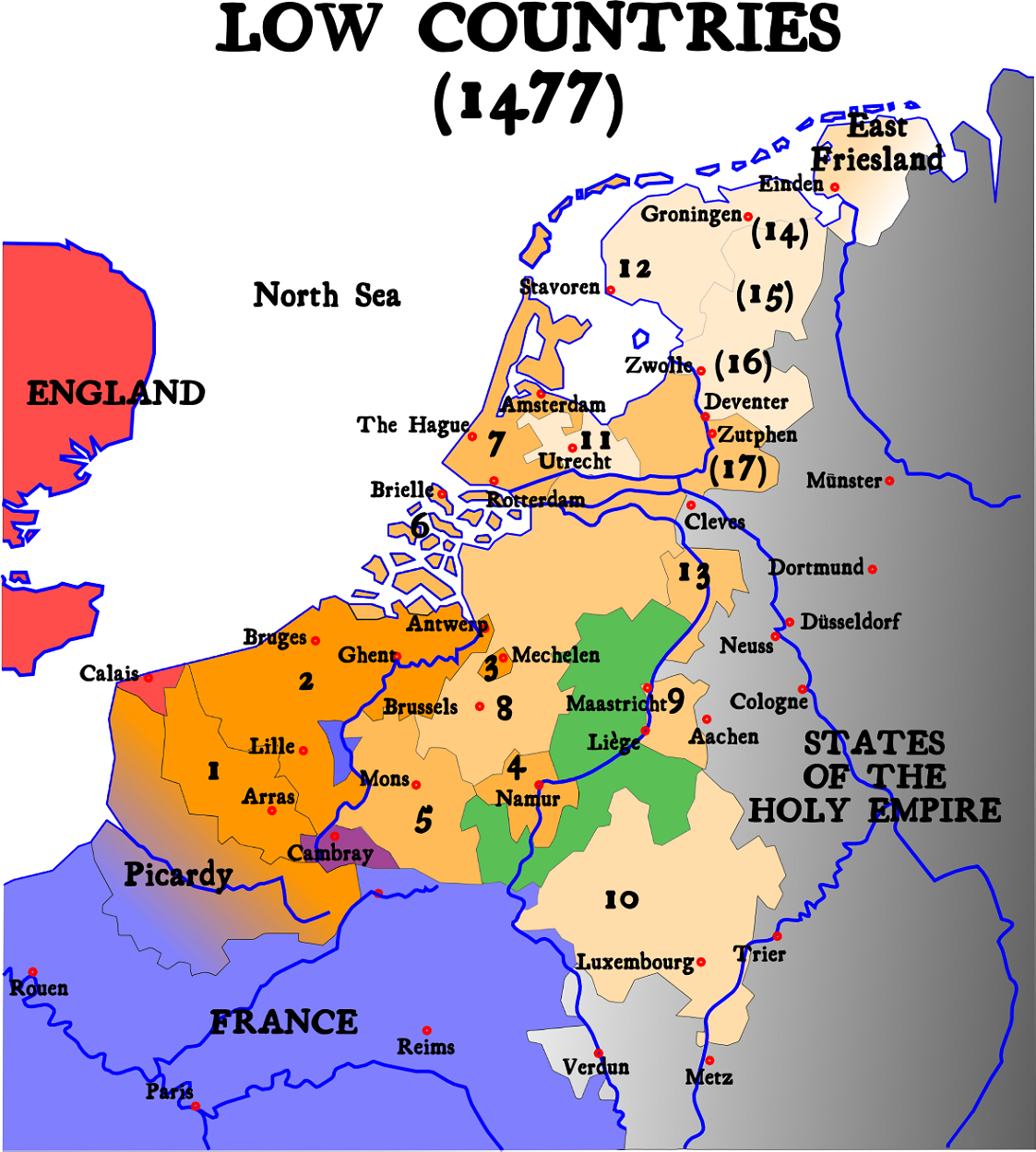
Map of the Low Countries, organized into the Seventeen Provinces, five years prior to being inherited by the Habsburgs.

Following the expansion of both the printing press and the Reformation during the first half of the sixteenth century, various editions of the book were widely circulated throughout the Low Countries while the region was under the control of Charles V and the Holy Roman Empire. Between 1518 and 1550, twenty separate editions of Fasciculus mirre were printed in the bustling, mercantile hub of Antwerp, a city which was becoming an epicenter of commercial printing as well as a popular safe-haven for non-Catholic religious movements such as Calvinism and Lutheranism.

== Dutch Printed Editions, 1500-1578 ==
- 1500: Delft - Roelant Bollaert
- 1504: Antwerp - Willem Vorsterman
- 1517: Delft - Hugo Jansz (or Janszoon) van Woerden, edited by Matthias Weynsen (or Weijnsen) (or Matthijs Wentsen)
- 1518: Antwerp - Henrick van Eckert Homberch, edited by Matthias Weynsen
- 1519: Antwerp - Willem Vorsterman, edited by Matthias Weynsen
- 1519: The Hague - Hugo Jansz van Woerden
- 1520: Antwerp - Heyndrick Peetersen van Middelburch, edited by Matthias Weynsen
- 1526: Antwerp - Symon Cock voor (for) Roelant Bollaert, edited by Matthias Weynsen
- 1527: Antwerp - Jan I van Ghelen
- 1527: Antwerp - Willem Vorsterman
- 1529: Antwerp - Symon Cock, edited by Matthias Weynsen
- 1534: Antwerp - Willem Vorsterman
- 1535: Antwerp - Willem Vorsterman
- 1537: Antwerp - Hansken van Liesvelt
- 1537: Antwerp - Heyndrick Peetersen van Middelburch
- 1538: Antwerp - Heyndrick Peetersen van Middelburch
- 1539: Antwerp - Symon Cock
- 1540: Antwerp - Jan I van Ghelen
- 1540: Antwerp - Heyndrick Peetersen van Middelburch
- 1543: Antwerp - Willem Vorsterman, edited by Matthias Weynsen
- 1543: Antwerp - Jacob van Liesvelt
- 1544: Antwerp - Heyndrick Peetersen van Middelburch, edited by Matthias Weynsen
- 1546: Leiden - Peter Janszoon, edited by Matthias Weynsen
- 1548: Antwerp - Jacob van Liesvelt, edited by Matthias Weynsen
- 1550: Antwerp - Heyndrick Peetersen van Middelburch, edited by Matthias Weynsen
- 1550: Unknown Location - Unknown Printer (woodcuts by Bollaert?)
- 1554: Leiden - Peter Janszoon, edited by Matthias Weynsen
- 1565: Antwerp - Peeter van Keerberghen, edited by Matthias Weynsen
- 1565: Leiden - Dierick Gerridt Horst voor Peeter van Keerberghen, edited by Matthias Weynsen
- 1569: Antwerp - Jan II van Ghelen
- 1572-78: Antwerp - Symon Cock voor Roelant Bollaert

== English Jesuit Version ==
In 1632-33, the book was translated into English by the Jesuit priest John Falconer. Falconer published it as Fasciculus myrrhæ. Or a briefe treatise of our Lord and Sauiours passion. Written by the R. Fa. I. F. of the Society of Iesus.

== Modern Significance ==
Fully intact copies are extremely rare, but can be found through the Universal Short Title Catalogue database. Typically, only leaves (single pages with text on each side) can be found within the United States, either in museums or in University Libraries of Special Collections, as such leaves are prized among collectors of rare medieval manuscripts, incunabula, and post-incunabula.

== Examples of Leaves Housed at University Libraries in the United States ==
- Indiana University of Pennsylvania Indiana, Pennsylvania
- University of South Carolina Columbia, South Carolina
- University of Missouri Columbia, Missouri
- Western Michigan University Kalamazoo, Michigan
- Portland State University, Portland, Oregon

== See also ==
- Book of hours
- Block books
- Incunable
- Global spread of the printing press
- List of printers in the Southern Netherlands
- The Protestant Reformation
- Habsburg Netherlands
- Guild of Saint Luke
