= Libertus Houthem =

Libertus Houthem (died 1584) was an educator and Neo-Latin author from the prince-bishopric of Liège who died as court chaplain to Holy Roman Emperor Rudolph II.

== Life ==
Houthem was a member of the Brethren of the Common Life and taught Latin in the congregation's school in Liège. He also wrote Latin verse and drama for educational purposes.

In 1577 he transferred to Brussels, where he was elected head of the congregation's house. After the Calvinist coup in Brussels he was imprisoned. In 1579 he escaped the city and made his way to Mons. There he was appointed head of a local school by the city council, and censor of books by the Privy Council.

In 1583 Houthem was appointed chaplain to the imperial court of Rudolph II. He died in Prague in 1584, and his final work was published there posthumously.

== Works ==
- Absoluta conficiendorum versuum methodus (Liège, Gauthier Morberius, 1572). Available on Google Books.
  - Reprinted Leuven, Rutger Velpius, 1576. Available on Google Books.
- Theatrum humanae vitae, comoedia nova (Liège, Gauthier Morberius, 1574). Available on Google Books.
- Gedeon. Tragico-comoedia sacra (Liège, Gauthier Morberius, 1575). Available on Google Books.
- Ethica vitae ratio, seu moralia vitae instituendae (Liège, Gauthier Morberius, 1577). Available on Google Books.
- Kakoseitnia seu mala vicinia, libellus, vicinos malos (Mons, Rutger Velpius, 1580). Available on Google Books.
- Demonstration, par laquelle clairement s'aperçoit qu'on ne se doit nullement transporter à la nouvelle pretendue religion (Mons, Rutger Velpius, 1580).
- Ficulneorum Auriaci principis auxiliorum, quibus hereticae factionis urbes temere nituntur, demonstratio (Mons, Rutger Velpius, 1583). Available on Google Books.
- De Politici Magistratus Officijs, edited for posthumous publication by Jacob Chimarrhaeus (Prague, G. Nigrini, 1585). Available on Google Books.
