= Gilles Guillon =

Theologian and mathematician

Gilles Guillon (c. 1575–1620) was a theologian and mathematician from Liège.

== Life ==
Guillon was born in Liège around 1575. By 1604 he had the curacy of the parish of Sainte-Marguerite in the suburbs of Liège, which he resigned in order to travel to Rome. There he made the acquaintance of the Jesuit mathematician Christopher Clavius. Returning to Liège, he was appointed to a prebend of St Martin's Church, which he quickly resigned to take up a position at Grancey, in Burgundy, where he died in 1620. He was mourned by the Count of Grancey and his children, whom he had instructed in mathematics.

== Publications ==
- Institution de l'arithmétique avec les gettons et la croye (Liège, Léonard Streel, 1604)
- De l'Invocation et de l'intercession des Saints, avec la vie de saint Léonard et les miracles advenus par ses mérites au faubourg de la cité de Liège (Liège, Léonard Streel, 1605)
- L'algèbre de Christophe Clavius, sommairement recueillie et traduite du latin, par Gille Guillion, prêtre liégeois du collège de Saint-Martin (Liège, Léonard Streel, 1612)
