= Philippe de Maldeghem =

Philippe de Maldeghem (died 1611) was a Renaissance courtier, mayor of the Brugse Vrije and a translator of Petrarch.

== Life ==
Philippe's father was Josse van Maldeghem, lord of Leyschot and Oetsel, chamberlain to the duke of Bavaria, and mayor of the Brugse Vrije; his mother was Anne de Joigny de Pamele.

Philippe himself was steward and chamberlain to Ernest of Bavaria, Archbishop-Elector of Cologne and Prince-Bishop of Liège, and followed in his father's footsteps as mayor of the Brugse Vrije (1578–1608).

In 1600 he published a French translation of Petrarch in Brussels, dedicated to Maximilian of Bavaria.

He was knighted on 21 May 1605.

In 1567 he married Martine de Boonem (died 1607), who brought the lordship of Avelgem to the marriage. Together they had a number of children:

1. Adolf, lord of Leyschot, Oetsel and Avelgem (knighted 30 March 1617), who several times served as mayor of Bruges
2. Josse, governor of Damme and of Landrecies
3. Robert, lord of Grimârès, who served in the Army of Flanders, rising to the rank of Lieutenant-General (knighted 15 August 1610)
4. Philip, lord of Steenmare
5. Sebastiane, who married Josse Casembroot, lord of Oostwinckel.

Philippe van Maldeghem died in Bruges in 1611 and was buried in St Philip's chapel in the Dominican church there.

== Works ==
- Petrarque traduit en rime Françoise (Brussels, Rutger Velpius, 1600)
