= Lancelot de Casteau =

Chef

Lancelot de Casteau or de Chasteau or de Chestea, also known as Anseau de Chestea (died 1613) was the master chef for three prince-bishops of Liège in the 16th century: Robert de Berghes, Gérard de Groesbeek, and Ernest of Bavaria and the author of a cookbook, the Ouverture de cuisine, often considered the first cookbook to go beyond medieval recipes and to codify haute cuisine.

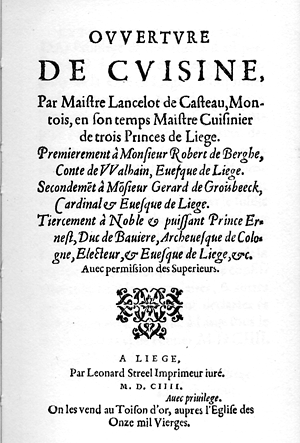
Title page of Casteau's Ouverture de cuisine

== Biography ==
de Casteau was born in Mons. As an adult, he lived in Liège. In 1557, he organized a banquet for the Joyous Entry of Robert of Berghes. He was admitted to the bakers' guild in 1562, to the mercers' (merchants') guild in 1567, and became a burgher in 1571. He married Marie Josselet alias de Herck c. 1572, and they had a daughter, Jeanne.

He was a rich burgher who owned considerable property but from 1601, the prince-bishop no longer paid for his services, and his financial situation deteriorated, forcing him to live with his daughter and his son-in-law, a goldsmith named Georges Libert, who supported him.

He died in 1613.

== Ouverture de cuisine ==
De Casteau's Ouverture de cuisine was printed in 1604 by Léonard Streel, with a dedication to Jean Curtius. The book is mentioned by multiple writers starting in the 18th century, but the last copy was thought to have been destroyed during the Napoleonic Wars. In 1958, a private party offered a copy to the Royal Library of Belgium, which bought it. This is the only known copy.

It is the first cookbook published in French in the Low Countries, and is intermediate between medieval cuisine and the haute cuisine of the 17th century.

It contains early recipes for whipped cream and choux pastry.
