= Gauthier Morberius =

Belgian printer

- Walther Morbier
- Died: 1595; Liège, Belgium
- Other name: Gualterius Morberius
- Occupation: Printer
- Years active: 1553–1594
- Era: handpress
- Employer(s): city of Liège; prince-bishop of Liège
- Notable work: Breviarium in usum sancti Pauli Leodiensis (2 vols., 1560), Statuts et ordonnances touchant le stil et maniere de proceder et l'administration de justice (1572), Philippe Gherinx, Description des fontaines acides de Spa (1583)
- Children: Jeanne, Charles, Catherine, Marie
- Relatives: Léonard Streel (son-in-law), Christian Ouwerx (son-in-law)

Gauthier Morberius or Walther Morbier (died 1595) was the first printer in the city of Liège, where he was active 1558–1594.

== Career ==
Morberius, probably a native of the county of Loon, began his printing career in Antwerp in 1553 and was active in that city at least until 1555. He was then invited to set up a press in Liège, the first in the city. He was formally appointed printer to the city on 28 October 1558. In 1560 he also became official printer to the prince-bishop of Liège, Robert of Berghes (1557–1564). He continued to serve Berghes's successors, Gérard de Groesbeek (1564–1580) and Ernest of Bavaria (1581–1612).

== Family ==
His son, Charles, was deaf and mute and unable to continue the family business, but his two younger daughters married men who carried on the trade of printing in the city: Catherine became the wife of Léonard Streel and Marie the wife of Christian Ouwerx. In 1588 Morberius made out a will bequeathing the business to his son-in-law, Léonard Streel, on condition that he support Charles throughout his life. The eldest daughter, Jeanne, married Paulus Fabricius, doctor of law. Morberius died in March 1595. The position of printer to the prince-bishop passed to his other son-in-law, Christian Ouwerx.

== Publications ==
- 1560: Breviarium in usum venerabilis ecclesiae collegiatae Sti Pauli Leodiensis (2 vols., "pars hyemalis" and "pars aestivalis")
- 1563: Dionysius Carthusianus, Opusculum de vita sacerdotum ac canonicorum, & coeterum ministrorum ecclesiae
- 1568: Canones, et decreta sacrosancti oecumenici et generalis Concilii Tridentini
- 1570: Franciscus Sylvius, Progymnasmatum in artem oratoriam epitome
- 1571: John Leslie, A Treatise concerning the Defence of the Honour of the Right High, Mightie and Noble Princesse, Marie Queene of Scotland (Joannes Foulerus apud Gautier Morberius)
- 1572: Breviarium Romanum ex decreto sacrosancti Concilii Tridentini
- 1572: Statuts et ordonnances touchant le stil et maniere de proceder & l'administration de justice devant, & par les courts & justices seculieres du païs de Liege.
- 1574: Libertus Houthem, Theatrum humanae vitae comoedia nova. Available on Google Books.
- 1576: Dominique Lampson, Description de la fontaine ferrugineuse de Saint-Gille, près de Tungre
- 1577: Gilbert Lemborch (Gilbert Fuchs), Des fontaines acides de la forest d'Ardenne. Available on Google Books.
- 1581: Andreas Papius, Ernesto Leodiensem episcopo & principi inaugurato XIII kalendis julii M.D.LXXXI
- 1583: Philippe Gherinx, Description des fontaines acides de Spa, et de la fontaine de fer de Tongre
- 1589: Lettres patentes pour la conservation et maintien de la foy et religion chrestienne catholique apostolique romaine
- 1592: Loix, statuts et ordonnances sur le reglement de la justice
- 1593: Lettres patentes de declaration et ordonnance de sur la libre et paisable hantise et commerce.
