= Henricus Hornkens =

- Died: 1612
- Occupation: Clergyman
- Writing career
- Language: French, Spanish, Latin
- Period: Baroque
- Genre: Lexicography
- Notable work: Recueil de dictionnaires françoys, espagnols et latins (1599)

Henricus Hornkens, sometimes cited as Henri or Heinrich (died 1612), was a 16th-century priest and lexicographer.

== Life ==
Hornkens served Philip II of Spain and Philip III of Spain as a court chaplain. In 1598 he accompanied the Infanta Isabella Clara Eugenia to the Low Countries, where he became dean of the church of St Gummarus in Lier, Duchy of Brabant. He compiled a French-Spanish-Latin dictionary published in Brussels in 1599 and used by César Oudin in his own lexicographical work. He died in 1612.

== Work ==
- Recueil de dictionnaires françoys, espagnols et latins (Brussels: Rutger Velpius, 1599) Available on Google Books
