= Jacob van Liesvelt =

Flemish publisher and book printer (1489 – 1545)

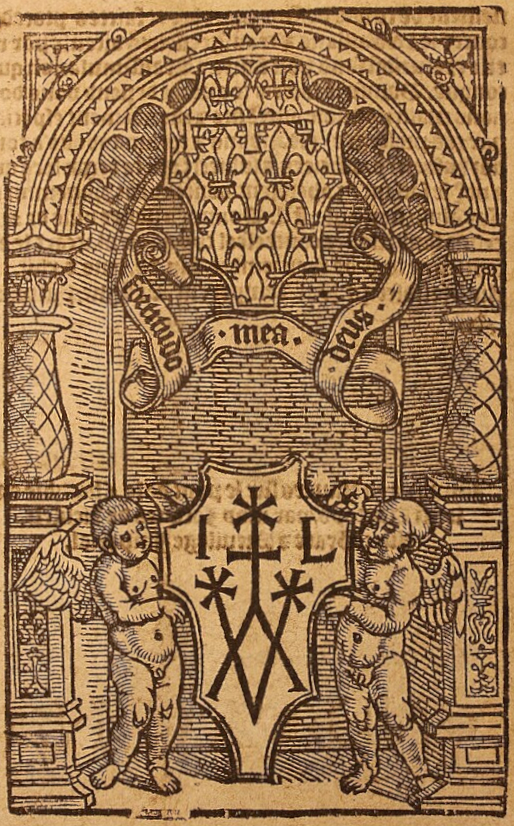
Printer's device of Jacob van Liesvelt, used in a publication of c. 1543

Jacob van Liesvelt or Jacob van Liesveldt (Antwerp, c. 1489, – Antwerp, 28 November 1545), was a Flemish printer, publisher and bookseller. His printing press put out publications in a wide range of genres, including poetry by Anna Bijns, Roman Catholic literature such as an anti-heresy decree, and publications that conflicted with Catholic teachings. He published the first complete Dutch translation of the Bible in 1526, largely based on Martin Luther's translation. He was eventually executed for publishing unauthorised versions of the Bible.

== Life ==
Jacob van Liesvelt was born around 1489 in Antwerp as the son of the printer Adriaen van Liesvelt. He followed in his father's footsteps and started on his own as a printer and bookseller in 1513. He was registered as a master printer in the Guild of Saint Luke of Antwerp in 1536. His printing business was located originally at the Lombaerdeveste. Later he moved his business to the building called 'In the Schilt of Artoys' on the Cammerpoortbrugghe, where he operated from 1523 to 1544.

Liesvelt collaborated on many of his publications with other printers such as Claes de Grave, Symon Cock, Hendrick Peetersen van Middelburch, and Marc Martens. In 1526, he printed the first Bible in Dutch. As he relied for this publication on the German translation of the New Testament made by Martin Luther he got into trouble with the authorities for engaging in 'heretical behavior'. In 1528, Liesvelt was the editor and printer of the Flemish poet Anna Bijns' first published work, Dit is een schoon ende suverlick boecxken inhoudende veel scoone constige refereinen. This was an important publication in Dutch-language literature, and established Anna Bijns' reputation as a leading poet of her generation.

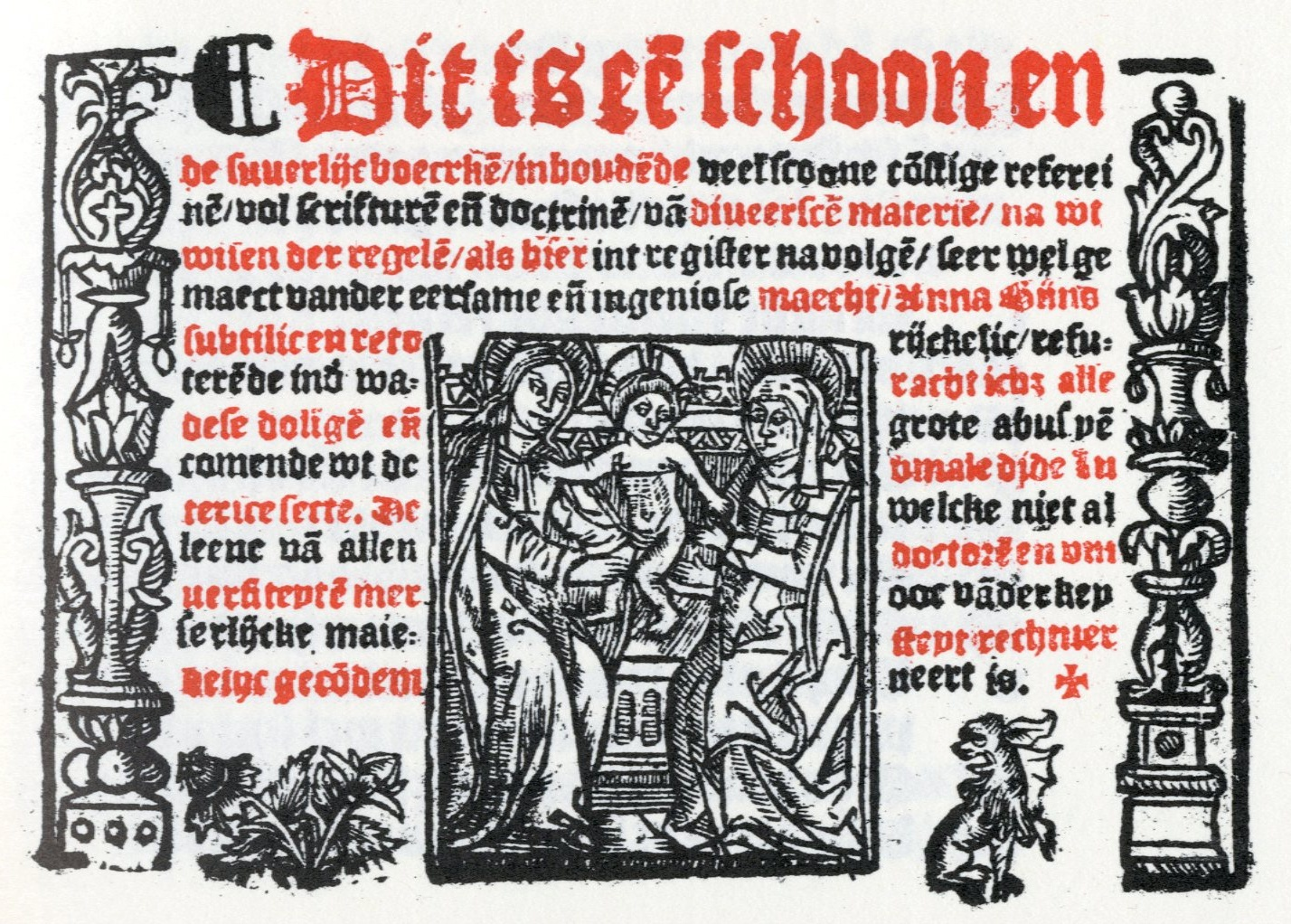
Title page of the Dit is een schoon ende suverlick boecxken inhoudende veel scoone constige refereinen by Anna Bijns, 1528

Van Liesvelt married Maria or Marie Ancxt (or Ancxten). She could be related to the Coecke van Aalst family.Their professional circles, artistic collaborations, and personal networks are overlapping in Antwerp. Hans van Liesvelt II, directly collaborated with printmakers and artists from the exact same artistic circle, publishing early woodcuts by masters like Pieter van der Borcht.

When in 1545 the persecution of heretics reached its peak, the bailiff of Antwerp charged van Liesvelt and had him arrested. The exact cause or reason of the prosecution or nature of the accusation is not entirely clear. For a long time it was assumed that the woodcut from chapter 4 of Matthew was at the basis of his problems. It depicts the scene in which Jesus is tempted by the Devil in the wilderness. The Devil is depicted as a bearded monk with bearded monk goat's feet, wearing a robe and holding a rosary. Many regarded this print as a sarcastic indictment of the clergy who were often blamed for hypocrisy. However, the Bible states about the apostle Paul that the Devil pretends to be an 'angel of light' (2 Corinthians 11:14). From this point of view, the woodcut could have been a reference to this verse and should not be the basis for any suspicion of heresy. In fact, the same woodcut was later used in authorised Catholic Bibles. It is more likely the new marginal notes in the 1542 edition caused his legal problems. One read that 'Salvation comes through Jesus Christ alone', which was clearly a Lutheran position in contradiction with the Catholic church's position that salvation can only come through the church. During his trial van Liesvelt was assisted by two lawyers. They argued that all his publications, with the exception of the Bible edition from 1526, had been issued with an official license: "Cum Gratia et Privilegio", which had given the printer the publishing permission. The argument was not successful, and van Liesvelt was sentenced to death. He was beheaded on 28 November of that year, at the age of 56.

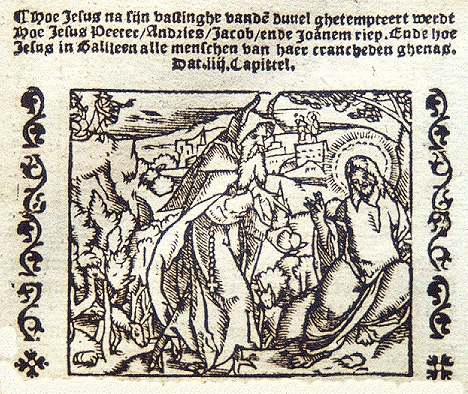
Illustration to Matthew 4.3 in van Liesvelt Bible of 1542

The wife of van Liesvelt Maria Ancxt published in 1544 two editions of the New Testament in the name of her husband Jacob van Liesvelt. One year after his execution, she petitioned the authorities for permission to continue the printing business of her deceased husband. She then continued the business herself. From 1551 she was assisted by her son Hans. In addition to her own name, she also used the term 'widow of Liesvelt' on her publications. She published mainly Catholic books. She was later engaged or married to the Roman Catholic printer Simon Cock.

Jacob's son, Hans van Liesvelt, also called Hans II, was still a minor when his father died. It is therefore likely that in the initial period he was only a minor assistant to his mother. In 1553 he published a New Testament with his mother. After that he became known as the publisher of almanacs, devotion books and a geographic map. Confusion has arisen about the son's activities since there was a relative with the same family name, whose first name was Hansken. To distinguish him from Jacob's son, he is also called Hans(ken) I. He was active between ca. 1525 and ca. 1539, at the same address as Jacob van Liesvelt. He is known for the Bible published on 12 November 1538.

== Publishing activities ==
=== General ===
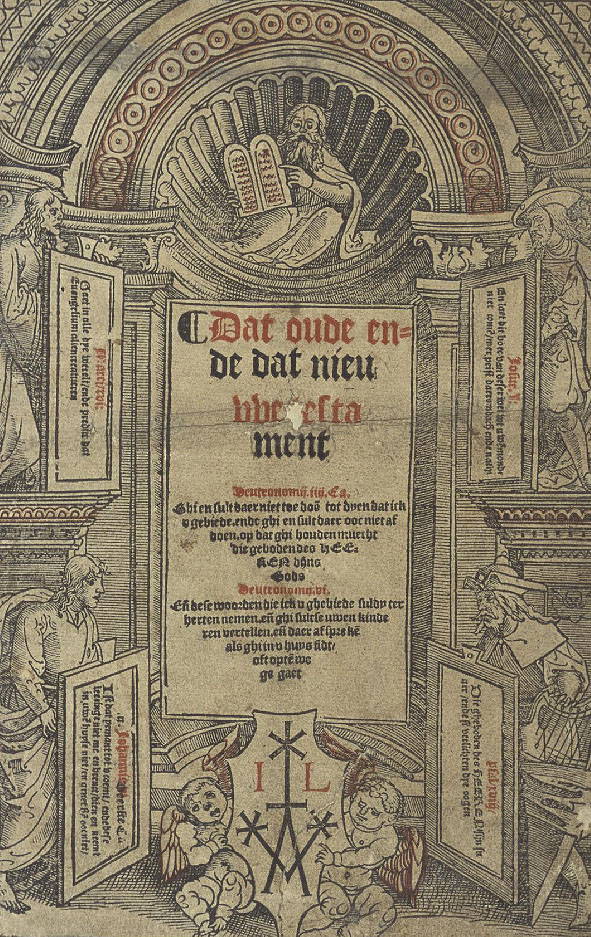
Title page of the van Liesvelt Bible of 1526

Jacob van Liesvelt printed and published works in a diverse range of genres. He is known to have used three different printer's marks throughout his career. His motto was 'Fortitudo mea deus', i.e. God is my strength.

The works published by the Jacob van Liesvelt press included both Catholic and Protestant literature. Among his other notable works are La desfianche faicte au tres puisant et noble Empereur Charles de par le roy de Franche et roy D'Engleterre et aussy la response du tres noble Empereur sur la ditte desfianche (The defiance to the very powerful and noble Emperor Charles laid down by the King of France and the King of England and also the response of the very noble Emperor to the said defiance) and a Dutch-language version of the same.

He was the first publisher of Anna Bijns and helped launch her as the leading Flemish poet with the publication in 1528 of Dit is een schoon ende suverlick boecxken inhoudende veel scoone constige refereinen.

== Liesvelt Bible ==
The first Dutch-language Bible printed by Jacob van Liesvelt in 1526 was known as the 'Liesvelt Bible'. It was based to the extent available on Luther's Bible translation. Luther published his German translation of the New Testament in September 1522. In 1523 Luther started his translation of the Old Testament, which was only completed in 1526. The text of the New Testament in the Liesvelt Bible is entirely based on Luther's edition from December 1522. The Old Testament text in the first edition made use of the parts of Luther's Old Testament that were already published and of the Vulgata and other translations. Six editions of this Bible appeared. The Old Testament part of edition of 1532 were based on the new translations of Luther It was thus the most Lutheran edition as it followed Luther's editions closely and included a short prologue that was an excerpt of Luther's prologue to his 1523 edition of the Pentateuch. After that edition, Liesvelt hardly made any changes to his editions. The last and sixth edition appeared in 1542.

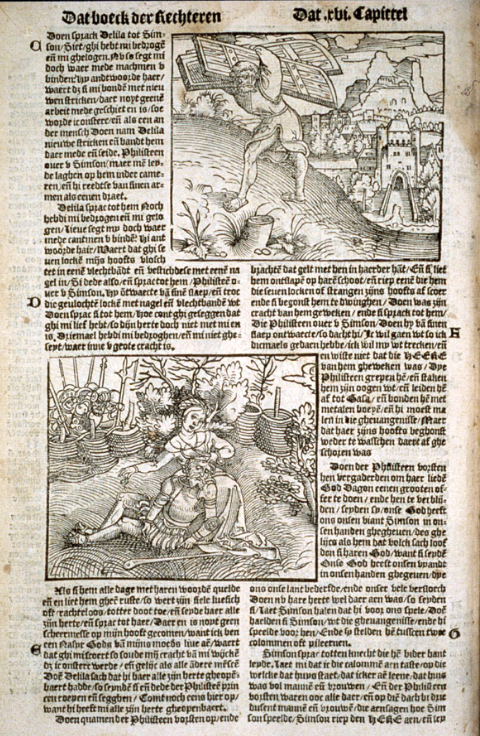
Page from the Book of Judges in the Van Liesvelt Bible edition of 1534

The title page of the 1526 edition shows various biblical characters such as Moses, Joshua and David and the evangelists Mark and John. It also contains a plea for the Bible for the people, which is expressed through a selection of bible texts. Van Liesvelt probably had the Cologne edition of the first Bible in Low German of 1478–79 in mind in the execution and design. The Liesvelt Bible was illustrated with woodcuts, several of which are attributed to the Dutch engraver Jan Swart van Groningen and copies of German woodcuts. Swart was active in Antwerp from 1523. For his Bible illustrations he relied heavily on the prints in Luther's Pentateuch printed in Wittenberg in 1523.

The Liesvelt Bible was cherished by the champions of the Reformation in the Low Countries. Reprints appeared until the second quarter of the 17th century. Later, a revised version of van Liesvelt's text would survive through the Biestkens Bible. This Bible was printed in 1560 in Groessen in the Northern Netherlands, likely by the Flemish exiled Nicolaes (Claes) Bieskens van Diest. It was a revised version of van Liesvelt's bible text and was the first Dutch Bible with numbered verses throughout. This version was particularly successful with Mennonites.
