= Léonard Streel =

Belgian printer

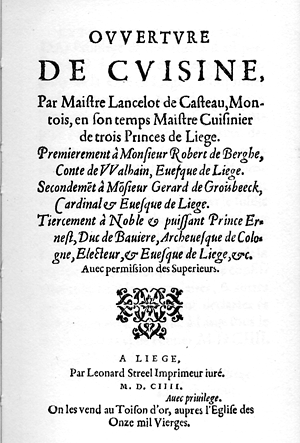
- Title page of Lancelot de Casteau's Ouverture de Cuisine, printed by Streel in 1604
- Died: 1653; Liège, Prince-Bishopric of Liège
- Other names: de Streel; Strele
- Occupation: Printer
- Years active: 1593–1653
- Era: handpress
- Employer(s): city of Liège; prince-bishop of Liège
- Notable work: Lancelot de Casteau, Ouverture de Cuisine (1604)
- Spouse: Catherine Morberius
- Children: Léonard Streel; Guillaume-Henri Streel
- Parent(s): Robert de Streel; Marie Beynen
- Relatives: Gauthier Morberius (father-in-law), Christian Ouwerx (brother-in-law)

Léonard (de) Streel or Strele (died 1653) was an active printer in the city of Liège for sixty years, from 1593 to 1653. His descendants carried on the family business into the 18th century.

== Life ==
Léonard Streel was born in Zoutleeuw, near Sint-Truiden, the son of Robert de Streel and Marie Beynen. He married Catherine, one of the daughters of Gauthier Morberius, who had established the first printing press in Liège. He inherited his father-in-law's business on condition that he care for his disabled brother-in-law, Charles Morberius. Morberius made his will in 1588 and it was registered, at Streel's request, on 14 June 1595.

Between 1593 and 1653, Streel published works in French, Latin and Dutch, mostly of an educational or religious nature, often financed by the booksellers Jaspar Ostreman, Lambert de la Coste, Jean de Glen and Guillaume Hovius. In 1590 he was working from the address "St Sebastian" near the bishop's palace. From 1600 his address was in "the Galley" on the Rue Gerardrie. Around 1636 he, or possibly one of his sons with the same name. was working from "the Earthly Paradise" on Rue Souverain Pont.

Streel died in Liège in 1653. His business was continued by his widow, Catherine Morberius, and then by their son, Guillaume-Henri.

== Publications ==
1594

- [anonymous], Warachtich verhael van de groote tyrannye des groeten Turcqs

1595

- Heinrich Seuse, XXI meditations et exercises spirituelz tresutiles pour conduire l'ame fidelle en la contemplation des principaux mysteres de la passion pour tous les jours de la sepmaine. Ensemble les xv effusions de nostre Seigneur
- Lambertus Schenckelius, De memoria et admirandis memoriae exemplis libri duo

1599

- Manuale sodalitatis sive exercitium spirituale christianae pietatis. In gratiam et usum sodalium congregationis beatae Virginis annunciatae Leodii institutae (for Jaspar Ostreman)
- Philippe Gherinx, Description des fontaines acides de Spa

1600

- William Colson, L'arithmetique par practique tant es nombres entiers que nombres rompus. Joincte la maniere de diviser sans division par addition et soubstraction seule
- Bartol Ðurđević, Discours de la maniere de vivre et ceremonies des Turcs
- Bartol Ðurđević, Voiage de la saincte cité de Hierusalem
- Manuale sodalitatis sive exercitium spirituale christianae pietatis. In gratiam et usum sodalium congregationis beatae Virginis annunciatae Leodii institutae

1601

- Abrégé des apologies et défences de S. Thomas et de S. Bonaventure

1602

- Gilles Guillon, Institution de l’arithmétique avec les gettons et la croye très utile et profitable à tous marchans receveurs compteurs de fosses et autres qui détestans les comptes vicieux

1603

- William Colson, Livre, ou instruction de l'art de l'arithmetique es nombres entiers selon les cinq especes, auec une table y ioinct l'art ou l'ordre militaire, qui est la maniere de composer promptement les bataillons quarrés
- Lucas Pinelli, Le Gerson de la perfection religieuse et de l’obligation que chaque religieux a de l’acquérir
- [anonymous], La Vie et miracles de monsieur S. Servais evesque, extraict hors sa legende, nouvellement corrigée

1604

- Lancelot de Casteau, Ouverture de cuisine
- Gilles Guillion, Institution de l'arithmetique avec les gettons, et la croye: tres utile & profitable à tous marchans, receveurs, compteurs de fosses

1605

- [anonymous], La vie de Sainct Hubert, évesque et fondateur de la cité de Liège et grand patron des Ardennes
