= Rutger Velpius =

- Rutger Van Velpen
- Born: around 1540; Leuven, Duchy of Brabant, Habsburg Netherlands
- Died: 1614 or 1615; Brussels, Duchy of Brabant, Spanish Netherlands
- Citizenship: City of Brussels (from 1586)
- Occupations: printer and bookseller
- Years active: 1564–1614
- Era: handpress
- Organization(s): University of Leuven; City of Mons; Brussels Court
- Spouse: Catherine Waen
- Children: Catherine Velpius
- Parent: Renier Velpius

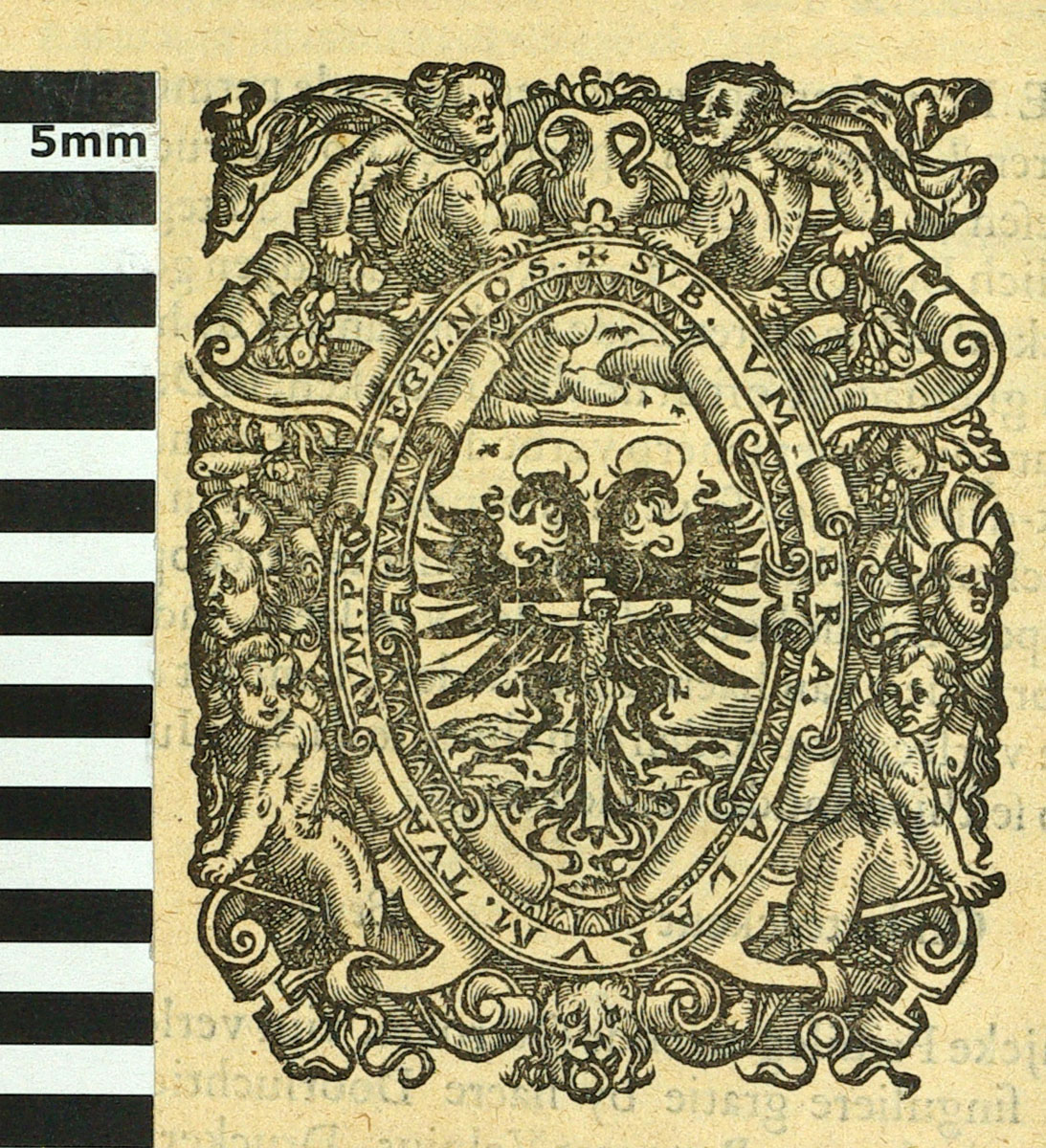
Printer's device of Rutger Velpius as used in Placcaet ende ordinancie vande eertzhertoghen [...] waerby wort ordre ghestelt, tot [...] onderhoudinghe van zekere poincten ende articulen, ghesloten ende ghearresteert in het synode prouinciael van Mechelen [...] junius ende julius, sesthien hondert seuen [Ordinance] (August 31, 1608), Stadsarchief Mechelen M.01574(a)/B (f. B4 verso).

Rutger Velpius (around 1540–1614/15) was a 16th- and 17th-century printer and bookseller. He was the first printer in the city of Mons, and later became printer to the court in Brussels. His career coincided closely with the first decades of the Dutch Revolt

== Life ==
=== Leuven ===
Velpius became a bookseller in Leuven in 1564, and in 1565 was licensed as a "sworn bookseller" to the University of Leuven. Around 1567 he married Catherine Waen, daughter of the Scottish expatriate bookseller John Waen.

In 1570 Velpius was examined and certified as a printer, his certification specifying that he knew Latin, French and Flemish, and a little bit of Greek. For his work in Leuven he used two printer's marks: a large one with a crenellated tower, an angel of vengeance above it and the figures of Justice and Peace embracing before the gates, with the motto Justitia et pax osculate sunt. Psal. 84. (Justice and peace have kissed); and a smaller one showing Justice and Peace kissing with the motto Justitia et pax. In 1578 he was licensed to print the government's decrees.

=== Mons ===
In 1580 he relocated to Mons, becoming the first printer to work in the city. The local government equipped a printing workshop at the city's expense. To demonstrate his skill to the city magistrates, Velpius printed Libert Houthem's Kakogeitnia seu mala vicina, libellus, vicinos malos velut catalogo recensens (1580). The first work certainly printed in Mons is Le Renart decouvert (1580), an anonymous satire on William of Orange written by Jean Richardot. Although a native speaker of Dutch, during this period of his life Velpius printed almost exclusively in French.

In 1966 facsimiles of Kakogeitnia and Le Renart decouvert were printed in Mons as a single volume with the title Les premiers livres imprimés à Mons, and with introductions by Christiane Pierard and Pierre Ruelle.

=== Brussels ===
In 1585 Velpius relocated again, to Brussels, in the wake of Alexander Farnese, Duke of Parma, by whom he was appointed printer to the court. He established his business in a bookshop called "Den gulden Arend" (The Golden Eagle), opposite the Coudenberg Palace. Here he designed a new printer's mark, a two-headed eagle charged with a crucifix, and the motto Sub umbra alarum tuarum protege nos (Protect us in the shadow of your wings). In 1586 he obtained citizenship of the city of Brussels.

Besides decrees and other official pieces he also published a great many occasional pieces and books in several languages. The Royal Library of Belgium catalogues 170 works published by Velpius between 1585 and 1600. In 1588 and 1589 he printed or reprinted a number of news reports from France. In Brussels his output also reflected the interests of courtiers, with a number of Spanish books, particularly on military and religious themes, as well as news pamphlets about Habsburg military victories in the Low Countries and in Hungary.

In 1607 Velpius printed in Spanish Don Quixote, correcting many errors of the first and second edition printed in Madrid in 1605. Unfortunately, these corrections were not included in the third and successive editions elsewhere.

In 1594 his daughter, Catherine, married Hubert Anthoon, and from 1598 Velpius brought his son-in-law into the business, leaving it for him to run after his death in 1614 or 1615. In 1617, Anthoon published the Second Part of Don Quixote (first edition in Madrid in 1615). Under the name Huberto Antonio he also published many other novels and plays in Spanish.

== Select list of publications ==
=== Decrees and news pamphlets ===
- Een sekere ende warachtighe goede nyeuwe tijdinghe van het belech van het eylant van Malta, met die schoone victorie teghen den Turck, voor het fortres van Sint Elmo (Leuven, 1565) – news of the failure of the Great Siege of Malta
- Edict, ordonnance et instruction sur l'exercice et l'administration de la jurisdiction et justice militaire, 15 May 1587 (Brussels, 1587) – an edict on military justice. Available on Google Books
- Warachtich verhael van die miraculeuse ende wonderlycke victorie int inne-nemen van Caleys (Brussels, 1596) – an account of the taking of Calais
- Brief discours du voyage et entrees faictes par la royne d'Espagne en Italie, avecq les triumphes et pompes exhibees, tant en Ostia, Ferrare, Mantoue, Cremone, Milan, que es autres. Ensemble la relation du voyage faict par Albert en Allemaigne (Brussels, 1598) – an account of the journey to Italy of Albert VII, Archduke of Austria and Margaret of Austria, Queen of Spain. Available on Google Books
- Waerachtigh verhael vande batalie ende slagh gebeurt ontrent de stadt van Brugghe, op Sondach den tweeden dagh van Julius 1600 (Brussels, 1600) – a report of the Battle of Nieuwpoort. Available on Google Books
- Procuratie oft bevestinghe der Conincklijcke Mayet. van Spaignien, etc. Ende haer Doorluchtichste Hoocheden, Souverayne Princen ter d'eenre, ende de E. M. H. H. Staten der vereenichde Nederlantsche Provincien, ter andere zijden. Waer in het Bestant ofte Trefves van 12 Jaren besloten binnen der stadt van Antwerpen den 9 April 1609 ende de Articulen daer van ghemaect, ende te voren bysonder wtghegheven, geconfirmeert ende bevesticht worden (Brussels, 1609) – publication of the ratification of the Twelve Years' Truce. Available on Google Books
- Placcaet vande eertz-hertogen onse ghenaedichste heeren ende princen. Ghemaeckt teghen de beroepinghen tot Vechten, by vorme van Duel, 27 February 1610 (Brussels, 1610) – an edict against duelling. Available on Google Books

=== Other works ===
- Epistolae Indicae de praeclaris, et stupendis rebus, quas divina bonitas per societatem Jesu in India, & variis insulis per societatem nominis Jesu operari dignata est (Leuven, 1566)
- Claude de Sainctes, Discours oft corte enarratie, op die beroovinghe der catholycker kercken gheschiet door die oude ketteren, ende nieuwe Calvinisten van onsen tyden (Leuven, 1567) Available on Google Books
- Epistolae Japanicae, de multorum gentilium in variis insulis ad Christi fidem per societatis nominis Jesu theologos conversione (Leuven, 1569) Available on Google Books
- (Jean Richardot), Le Renart decouvert (Mons, 1580).
- Jean Bosquet, Fleurs morales et sentences perceptives (Mons, 1581)
- Sancho de Londoño, Discurso sobre la forma de reducir la disciplina militar a mejor y antiguo estado (Brussels, 1587)
- Francisco de Valdés, Espeio, y deceplina militar (Brussels, 1589)
- Pedro Cornejo, Compendio y breve relation de la liga y confederacion francesa (Brussels, 1591)
- Bernardino de Escalante, Dialogos del arte militar (Brussels, 1595)
- Joannes David, Kettersche Spinnecoppe (Brussels, 1596)
- Bernardino de Mendoza, Theoricque et practique de guerre (Brussels, 1597)
- Henri Hornkens, Recueil de Dictionaires Francoys, Espaignolz et Latins (Brussels, 1599) – a combined French-Spanish-Latin dictionary Available on Google Books
- Jacques Blaseus, Sermon funèbre faict par le rév. évesque de Νamur, messire Jacques Blaseus, aux funérailles du trèscatholique, très-hault et trèspuissant Prince et Monarque Philippe 2, Roy des Espaignes, etc., célébrez en Brusselles, en l'Église de Ste Goedele (Brussels, 1599)
- Francesco Petrarca, Le Petrarque en rime francoise, trans. Philippe de Maldeghem (Brussels, 1600)
- Mateo Luján de Sayavedra, Segunda parte de la vida del picaro Guzman de Alfarache (Brussels, 1604) Available on Google Books
- Melchior de Santa Cruz, Floresta española de apotehgmas o sentencias fabia y graciosamente dichas, de algunos Españoles (Brussels, 1605) Available on Google Books
- Philip Numan, Histoire des Miracles advenuz n'agueres a l'intercession de la Glorieuse Vierge Marie, au lieu dit Mont-aigu, prez de Sichen, au Duché de Brabant (Brussels, 1605)
- Joan Pallet, Dictionaire tres-ample de la langue françoise et espagnole (Brussels, 1606)
- Miguel de Cervantes, El ingenioso hidalgo don Quijote de la Mancha, First Part (Brussels, 1607)
- Justus Lipsius, Die Heylighe Maghet van Halle, translated by Philip Numan (Brussels, 1607) Available on Google Books
- César Oudin, Grammaire espagnolle explicquee en françois (Brussels, 1610) Available on Google Books
- Andres de Soto, Deux dialogues traitans de la doctrine & matiere des miracles, translated by Philip Numan (Brussels, 1613) Available on Google Books
  - Dutch version Twee t'samensprekingen behandelende de leeringe ende materie vanden mirakelen (Brussels, 1614) Available on Google Books
