= Willem Vorsterman =

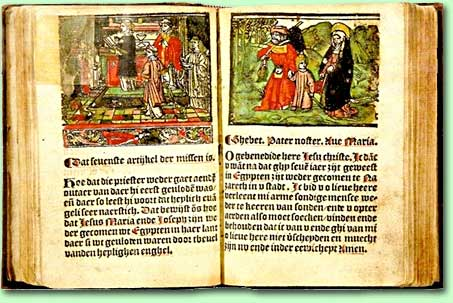
Two pages from Die beduydenisse der Missen by Gerrit vander Goude from 1530, with hand coloured woodcut illustrations

Willem Vorsterman (died 1543) was an early printer of books, active in Antwerp between 1504 and 1543. He published about 400 books in Dutch, Spanish, English, Latin, French and Danish, making him the second most productive printer in the Netherlands in the first half of the 16th century, behind Hillenius. His earliest production, between 1500 and 1520, consisted mainly of works of fiction in Dutch often in chapbook format, while he later expanded into other languages and genres, with more luxurious, illustrated editions. He entered the Antwerp Guild of Saint Luke in 1512 and was its dean in 1527 and 1542. His shop was in the "Golden Unicorn", near the Kammerpoort in Antwerp.

== Published works ==
- 1504: Amerigo Vespucci, Mundus Novus
- 1506: John Cassian, Dit is der ouder vader collasie
- 1511 or earlier: Den Herbarius in dyetsche, reprint of a work published by Johann Veldener in Leuven in 1484
- 1514: Bethlem, Een devote meditacie op die passie ons liefs Heeren Jesu Christi, reprinted numerous times until 1540
- 1515: Mariken van Nieumeghen
- 1515: Saint Jerome, anthology of his letters, partially reprinted in 1533
- 1516: Margarieta van Lymborch
- 1517: Die rechte conste om alderhande wateren te destilleeren
- 1518–1525: Elckerlijc
- 1520: Een seer ghenoechlike ende amoroeze historie vanden eedelen Lansloet ende die scone Sandrijn
- 1520: Den droefliken strijt van Roncevale
- 1521: William Lily, Libellus de constructione octo orationis partium ad codicem germanicum pluribus locis restitutus
- 1522: John Fisher, Convuslio calumniarum Ulrichi Veleni Minhoniensis
- 1523: Robert Sherwood, Ecclesiastes latine ad veritatem hebraicam recognitus
- 1527: Fasciculus mirre
- 1527: Een redelijck bewijs en verwinninghe der dolinghen
- 1528: Biblia a Dutch translation of the full Bible: also known are editions from 1530, 1532, 1533, 1534 and 1542. This translation was based on the work of Luther.
- 1528: Joannes Custos Brechtanus, Syntaxis Brechtana de integro nuper recognita
- 1528: Pronosticatie, Dit is een seer wonderlijcke prophecie (also exists in French, same year)
- 1529: Sebastian Virdung, Livre plaisant et très utile...
- 1529: Jacques Lefèvre d'Étaples, French translation of the Bible
- 1529–1531: a number of works in Danish by Christiern Pedersen, then exiled in the Low Countries
- 1530: Petrus Sylvius, Tfundament der medicinen ende chyrurgien (reprint 1540)
- 1531: Anthonis De Roovere, Die excellente cronicke van Vlaanderen
- 1533: Juan Luis Vives, Dutch translation of the De subventione pauperum
- 1536: Beatus Rhenanus, Vita Erasmi
- 1537: Bernard of Clairvaux, Een suyverlijck boecxken (reprinted 1540)
- 1538: La noble science des joueurs d'espée
- 1538: Historie vander coninghinnen Sibilla
- 1540: De verloren sone
- 1542: Nicolaus van Esch, Dye groote evangelische peerle vol devoter ghebede

== Sources ==
- Hilmar M. Pabel, Erasmus, Willem Vorsterman, and the Printing of St. Jerome's Letters, Quaerendo 37, 2007
