= John Fowler (Catholic scholar) =

Roman Catholic scholar (1537–1578/79)

John Fowler (Bristol, England, 1537 – Namur, present-day Belgium, 13 February 1578–9) was a Roman Catholic scholar and printer.

== Life ==
He studied at Winchester College from 1551 to 1553, when he proceeded to New College, Oxford where he remained till 1559. He became B.A. 23 February 1557 and M.A. in 1560, though Anthony Wood adds that he did not complete his degree by standing in comitia. On Elizabeth I's accession he was one of the fifteen Fellows of New College who left of their own accord or were ejected rather than take the Oath of Supremacy. He subsequently married Alice Harris, daughter of Sir Thomas More's secretary.

On leaving Oxford he withdrew to Leuven (French: Louvain), where like other scholars of his time he turned his attention to the craft of printing. He was licensed as a printer to the University of Leuven on 5 May 1565. Antony Wood says of him:

"He was well skilled in the Greek and Latin tongues, a tolerable poet and orator, and a theologian not to be contemned. So learned he was also in criticisms and other polite learning, that he might have passed for another Robert or Henry Stephens. He did diligently peruse the Theological Summa of St. Thomas of Aquin, and with a most excellent method did reduce them into a Compendium."

Fowler devoted the rest of his life to this work, winning from Cardinal Allen the praise of being catholicissimus et doctissimus librorum impressor. In the English state papers, the evidence of one Henry Simpson at York in 1571 mentions that Fowler printed all the English books in Leuven and that Dr. Harding's Welsh servant, William Smith, used to bring the works to the press. Between 1565 and 1575 some of Fowler's publications bore an Antwerp imprint, but it is not clear whether he printed these himself or had them printed by others in Antwerp, or (as A. C. Southern suggested) in fact printed them in Leuven with a false address.

In 1577 Fowler relocated to Douai, where he printed Gregory Martin's Treatise of Schism in 1578. In 1578 he moved to Rheims, and then to Namur. He died in Namur on 13 February 1579 and was buried in the city. His printing business was continued in Douai by his widow until 1602.

== Works ==
Original works or translations for which he was personally responsible include:

- An Oration against the unlawful Insurrections of the Protestants of our time under pretence to reforme Religion (Antwerp, 1566), translated from the Latin of Peter Frarinus, which provoked a reply from William Fulke;
- Ex universâ summâ Sacrae Theologiae Doctori os S. Thomae Aquinatis desumptae conclusiones (Louvain, 1570)
- M. Maruli dictorum factorumque memorabilium libri VI (Antwerp, 1577)
- Additiones in Chronica Genebrandi (1578);
- A Psalter for Catholics, a controversial work answered by Sampson
- epigrams and verses.

The translation of the Epistle of Orosius (Antwerp, 1565), ascribed to him by Wood and John Pitts, was really made by Richard Shacklock. Pitts states that he wrote in English a work Ad Ducissam Feriae confessionis forma.

Fowler edited Sir Thomas More's Dialogue of Comfort against Tribulation (Antwerp, 1573).

Works published by him include:

- Thomas Harding's replies to John Jewel (1566, 1567, 1568)
- Thomas Stapleton's translation of Bede's History (1566, the first English edition)
- Laurence Vaux's catechism (1574)
- Thomas à Kempis's De Christi imitatione (1575)
- The Jesus psalter (1575)
