= Rivière aux Graines =

Location
- Country: Canada
- Province: Quebec
- Region: Côte-Nord
- Regional County Municipality: Minganie Regional County Municipality

Physical characteristics
- Source: Swamp area
  - location: L'Île-d'Anticosti
  - coordinates: 49.75502°N 64.10741°W
  - elevation: 76 m (249 ft)
- Mouth: Gulf of Saint Lawrence
  - location: L'Île-d'Anticosti
  - coordinates: 49.725°N 64.12083°W
  - elevation: 1 m (3.3 ft)
- Length: 4.7 km (2.9 mi)

Basin features
- Tributaries
  - left: (upstream)
  - right: (upstream)

The rivière aux Graines (pronounced [ʁivjɛʁ o ɡʁɛn], "Seed River") is a tributary of the Gulf of Saint Lawrence, flowing in the municipality of L'Île-d'Anticosti, in the Minganie Regional County Municipality, in the administrative region of North Shore, in province of Quebec, in Canada.

A network of secondary forest roads serves this small valley and is linked to the road which runs along the southern coast of the island.

Forestry is the main economic activity in this area.

== Geography ==
The rivière aux Graines draws its source from a marsh area (altitude: 76 m (249 ft)) located in the western part of Anticosti Island.

From its source, the river flows south between La Petite Rivière (located on the west side) and the Bec-Scie River (located on the east side). Its course descends on 4.7 km (2.9 mi) towards the south with a drop of 75 m (246 ft), recovering two streams (coming from a marsh area in the west) and crossing a marsh area

The rivière aux Graines empties on the south shore of Anticosti Island, either 1.9 km (1.2 mi) west of Pointe aux Pimbinas, at 4.8 km (3.0 mi) in west of the mouth of the Bec-Scie River and 19.5 km (12.1 mi) east of the center of the village of Port-Menier. At its mouth, the current of the river flows to about 0.74 km (0.46 mi) at low tide in the sandstone.

== Toponymy ==
The toponymic designation appeared in 1955 on a geographic map used by the Consolidated Bathurst logging company. This toponym was made official on December 5, 1968, at the Bank of place names of the Commission de toponymie du Québec.

== See also ==
- List of rivers of Quebec
