= Rivière au Fusil =

Location
- Country: Canada
- Province: Quebec
- Region: Côte-Nord
- Regional County Municipality: Minganie Regional County Municipality

Physical characteristics
- Source: Félice pond
  - location: L'Île-d'Anticosti
  - coordinates: 49.71206°N 63.59121°W
  - elevation: 117 m (384 ft)
- Mouth: Gulf of Saint Lawrence
  - location: L'Île-d'Anticosti
  - coordinates: 49.57278°N 63.79389°W
  - elevation: 1 m (3.3 ft)
- Length: 22.6 km (14.0 mi)

Basin features
- Tributaries
  - left: (upstream) stream, discharge from Lac au Fusil.
  - right: (upstream) two streams, discharge from a lake.

The rivière au Fusil (English: Rifle River) is a tributary of the Gulf of St. Lawrence, flowing in the municipality of L'Île-d'Anticosti, in the Minganie Regional County Municipality, in the administrative region of Côte-Nord, in province of Quebec, in Canada.

A network of forest roads serves this small valley. Forestry is the main economic activity in this area; second, recreational tourism activities.

== Geography ==
The Rivière au Fusil draws its source from the Étang Félice (length: 0.5 km (0.31 mi); altitude: 127 m (417 ft)) located in the center-west of the Anticosti Island. This source is located at:

- 56 km (35 mi) east of the town center of the village of Port-Menier;
- 15.2 km (9.4 mi) south of the north shore of Anticosti Island;
- 18.8 km (11.7 mi) northeast of the south shore of Anticosti Island.

From the mouth of Étang Félice, the Rivière au Fusil flows over 22.6 km (14.0 mi) entirely in the SÉPAQ Anticosti, with a drop of 126 m (413 ft), depending on the segments following:

- 7.7 km (4.8 mi) towards the south, forming a large curve with a diameter of approximately 4.4 km (2.7 mi) oriented towards the east, successively crossing a series of small lakes whose the Wild Pond (altitude: 125 m (410 ft)) and the Goélands Pond (altitude: 116 m (381 ft)), collecting the discharge (coming from the west) of a small lake, up to a bend in the river corresponding to a stream (coming from the north);
- 2.0 km (1.2 mi) towards the south, to the outlet (coming from the northeast) of two lakes including Lac au Fusil;
- 14.9 km (9.3 mi) towards the south, first forming a curve towards the west, until its mouth.

The Rivière au Fusil flows on the south shore of Anticosti Island, on the east side of Baie du Fayette-Brown, that is 6.7 km (4.2 mi) to the southeast of the mouth of the rivière à la Loutre, at 7.1 km (4.4 mi) west of the mouth of MacGilvray brook, at 22.5 km (14.0 mi) north-west of Pointe Sud-Ouest and 52 km (32 mi) east of the village center of Port-Menier.

== Toponymy ==
The toponym "rivière au Fusil" is linked to that of "lac au Fusil" which is part of the same hydrographic slope.

This toponymic designation appeared in 1924 in the "Bulletin de la Société de Géographie de Québec", in the work "Monographie de l'Île d'Anticosti" written by Joseph Schmitt, published in 1904 and in 1955 on the map of the forestry company Consolidated Bathurst.

The toponym "rivière au Fusil" was made official on December 5, 1968, at the Place Names Bank of the Commission de toponymie du Québec.

== See also ==
- List of rivers of Quebec
