= Sainte Anne River (Anticosti Island) =

- Location within Quebec
- Native name: Rivière Sainte-Anne (île d'Anticosti) (French)

Location
- Country: Canada
- Province: Quebec
- Region: Côte-Nord
- RCM: Minganie
- Island: Anticosti Island

Physical characteristics
- Source: Marsh zone
  - location: L'Île-d'Anticosti
  - coordinates: 49.76386°N 63.74396°W
  - elevation: 118 m (387 ft)
- Mouth: Gulf of Saint Lawrence
  - location: L'Île-d'Anticosti
  - coordinates: 49.63667°N 63.825°W
  - elevation: 1 metre (3 ft 3 in)
- Length: 17.3 km (10.7 mi)

Basin features
- Tributaries
  - left: (upstream) stream, 2 discharges of a lake each.
  - right: (upstream) 2 streams, discharge from Lake Marmen.

The rivière Sainte-Anne is a watercourse flowing into Gulf of St. Lawrence, flowing in the municipality of L'Île-d'Anticosti, in the Minganie Regional County Municipality, in the administrative region of Côte-Nord, in province of Quebec, in Canada.

A single forest road serves the intermediate part of this valley. This carriage road connects to the west to a forest road network for forestry purposes, as well as to the main road passing on the northern slope of the island. Forestry is the main economic activity in this area; recreational tourism activities, second.

== Geography ==
The Sainte-Anne river draws its source from the southern part of a marsh area (altitude: 118 m (387 ft)) located in the center-west of Anticosti Island. This source is located at:

- 44.2 km (27.5 mi) east of the town center of the village of Port-Menier;
- 11.8 km (7.3 mi) south of the north shore of Anticosti Island;
- 15.6 km (9.7 mi) northeast of the south shore of Anticosti Island.

From its source, the Sainte-Anne river flows south between the rivière aux Cailloux (located on the west side) and the rivière à la Loutre (located on the east side). Its course descends on 17.3 km (10.7 mi) towards the south with a drop of 117 m (384 ft), according to the following segments:

- 11.2 km (7.0 mi) to the south collecting a stream (coming from the northeast), collecting the discharge (coming from the west) of Lake Marmen; then to the south, passing under the forest road bridge and collecting the discharge (coming from the northeast) of a lake, to the western limit of SÉPAQ Anticosti;
- 5.6 km (3.5 mi) first to the south in the SÉPAQ Anticosti, gradually bending towards the southwest, until a bend in the river located about one hundred meters from the north shore of the Gulf of Saint Laurent; then on 0.4 km (0.25 mi) towards the west parallel to the shore of the gulf, to its mouth.

The Sainte-Anne River flows onto the south shore of Anticosti Island, i.e. 15.5 km (9.6 mi) southeast of the western limit of SÉPAQ Anticosti and 31.2 km (19.4 mi) south-east of the center of the village of Port-Menier.

== Toponymy ==
According to Wikipedia, "Saint Anne" designates in Christianity several saints, blessed and venerable.

The toponymic designation "Rivière Sainte-Anne" appears in a 1904 volume, as well as in the Bulletin de la Société de géographie de Québec in 1924. This name also appears on a 1955 map of the forestry company Consolidated Bathurst.

The toponym “rivière Sainte-Anne” was made official on December 5, 1968, at the Place Names Bank of the Commission de toponymie du Québec.

== See also ==
- List of rivers of Quebec
