= Rivière à la Chute (Anticosti Island) =

Location
- Country: Canada
- Province: Quebec
- Region: Côte-Nord
- Regional County Municipality: Minganie Regional County Municipality

Physical characteristics
- Source: Unidentified lake
  - location: L'Île-d'Anticosti
  - coordinates: 49.44441°N 63.41779°W
  - elevation: 168 m (551 ft)
- Mouth: Gulf of Saint Lawrence
  - location: L'Île-d'Anticosti
  - coordinates: 49.3725°N 63.49333°W
  - elevation: 1 m (3.3 ft)
- Length: 12.3 km (7.6 mi)

Basin features
- Tributaries
  - left: (upstream)
  - right: (upstream)

The rivière à la Chute (French pronunciation: [ʁivjɛʁ a la ʃyt], "River of the Fall") is a tributary of the Gulf of St. Lawrence, flowing in the municipality of L'Île-d'Anticosti, in the Minganie Regional County Municipality, in the administrative region of Côte-Nord, in province of Quebec, in Canada.

A forest road (north–south direction) serves the west side of this valley, connecting the Pointe-Sud-Ouest of the island, the place called Tour-de-Jupiter (located on the watershed) and the main road passing on the northern slope of the island. A branch of this road descends towards the south-east to join the forest road along the southern coast of the island.

== Geography ==
Rivière à la Chute draws its source from a lake surrounded by marshes (length: 0.7 km (0.43 mi); altitude: 168 m (551 ft)), located in the center of the island. This area of the head lake has ponds and marsh areas. This source is located at:

- 79.3 km (49.3 mi) east of the town center of the village of Port-Menier;
- 42.1 km (26.2 mi) south of the north shore of Anticosti Island;
- 9.4 km (5.8 mi) northeast of the south shore of Anticosti Island.

From its source, the Rivière à la Chute flows over 12.3 km (7.6 mi) with a drop of 167 m (548 ft), according to the following segments:

- 7.6 km (4.7 mi) towards the south-west, forming a large curve towards the south-east and showing a strong drop in level, until a stream (coming from the east);
- 4.7 km (2.9 mi) to the south, first collecting a stream (coming from the northwest), then collecting the discharge (coming from the northwest) of a small lake and passing under the bridge of the forest road, to its mouth.

The Rivière à la Chute empties from the west side of Jumpers Reefs on the south shore of Anticosti Island, in the Gulf of Saint Lawrence, i.e. at 7.6 km (4.7 mi) to the west of the mouth of the Brick River, 14.4 km (8.9 mi) southeast of the mouth of Jupiter River and 79.4 km (49.3 mi) south-east of the center of the village of Port-Menier.

== Toponymy ==
This toponymic designation appears on the 1955 map of the Consolidated Bathurst forestry company, in the Bulletin de la Société de géographie de Québec of 1924, as well as in the Monographie de l'Île d'Anticosti published in 1904.

The toponym “rivière à la Chute” was made official on December 5, 1968, at the Bank of place names of the Commission de toponymie du Québec.

== See also ==
- List of rivers of Quebec
