= La Petite Rivière (Anticosti Island - Eastern part) =

- Location within Quebec

Location
- Country: Canada
- Province: Quebec
- Region: Côte-Nord
- Regional County Municipality: Minganie Regional County Municipality

Physical characteristics
- Source: Pond in marsh area
  - location: L'Île-d'Anticosti
  - coordinates: 49.19355°N 61.83394°W
  - elevation: 83 m (272 ft)
- Mouth: Gulf of Saint Lawrence
  - location: L'Île-d'Anticosti
  - coordinates: 49.08722°N 61.77111°W
  - elevation: 1 m (3.3 ft)
- Length: 16.9 km (10.5 mi)

Basin features
- Tributaries
  - left: (upstream) Four landfills from a set of small lakes and marshes.
  - right: (upstream) Discharge of a set of small lakes and marshes.

La Petite Rivière (French pronunciation: [la pətit ʁivjɛʁ], lit. 'The Little River') is a tributary of the Gulf of Saint Lawrence, flowing in the eastern part of the municipality of L'Île-d'Anticosti, in the Minganie Regional County Municipality, in the administrative region of Côte-Nord, in province of Quebec, in Canada.

The main forest road (east–west direction) of Anticosti Island indirectly serves the upper part of this valley. A secondary forest road serves the west bank of this small valley.

Forestry is the main economic activity in this area.

== Geography ==
La Petite Rivière draws its source from a very small lake (altitude: 83 m (272 ft)) surrounded by marshes and located in the eastern part of Anticosti Island. The mouth of this small lake is located at:

- 195.3 km (121.4 mi) east of the town center of the village of Port-Menier;
- 13.7 km (8.5 mi) east of the eastern tip of Anticosti Island;
- 6.5 km (4.0 mi) south of the northeastern shore of the island;
- 13.3 km (8.3 mi) north of the southeast shore of Anticosti Island.

From its source, the Petite Rivière generally flows south-east between the Cormorant River (located on the west side); and Baie du Naufrage (located on the east coast of Anticosti Island). Its course descends on 16.9 km (10.5 mi), with a drop of 82 m (269 ft), according to the following segments:

- 6.1 km (3.8 mi) first to the south-east in a marsh area to a bend in the river; then east, collecting the discharge (coming from the northwest) of a marsh area and another discharge (coming from the north) of the marsh at the end of the segment, to the discharge (coming from the north) d 'a set of small lakes and marshes;
- 8.9 km (5.5 mi) towards the south-east, forming small coils in places, collecting a stream (coming from the north-east) and crossing a marsh area at the end of the segment, until the discharge (coming from the northwest) of a small lake and marsh areas;
- 1.9 km (1.2 mi) towards the south-east crossing a marsh area, to its mouth.

La Petite Rivière empties into the western part of Cybèle Bay, on the south shore of Anticosti Island. This confluence is located 2.0 km (1.2 mi) northeast of the mouth of the Au Cormoran river, at 5.2 km (3.2 mi) southwest of Pointe Health (i.e. south at the eastern end of Anticosti Island) and 204 km (127 mi) east of the center of the village of Port-Menier.

The left bank of the lower course of the river serves as the limit for the Pointe-Heath ecological reserve

== Toponymy ==
Anticosti Island has two toponyms "La Petite Rivière"; one in the eastern part and the other in the western part.

The toponym "La Petite Rivière" was made official on September 12, 1974, at the place name bank of the Commission de toponymie du Québec.

== See also ==
- Minganie Regional County Municipality
- L'Île-d'Anticosti, a municipality
- Anticosti Island, an island
- Gulf of Saint Lawrence
- List of rivers of Quebec
