= Petite rivière de la Loutre =

Petite rivière à la Loutre

Location
- Country: Canada
- Province: Quebec
- Region: Côte-Nord
- Regional County Municipality: Minganie Regional County Municipality

Physical characteristics
- Source: Very little lake
  - location: L'Île-d'Anticosti
  - coordinates: 49°11′27″N 61°59′56″W
  - elevation: 72 m (236 ft)
- Mouth: Gulf of Saint Lawrence
  - location: L'Île-d'Anticosti
  - coordinates: 49°04′33″N 61°59′35″W
  - elevation: 1 m (3.3 ft)
- Length: 13.3 km (8.3 mi)

Basin features
- Tributaries
  - left: (upstream) stream (coming from the northeast) and 3 small streams.
  - right: (upstream) stream (coming from the northwest), stream (coming from the northwest) and 3 small streams.

The Petite rivière de la Loutre is a watercourse flowing into Gulf of St. Lawrence, flowing in the eastern part of the municipality of L'Île-d'Anticosti, in the Minganie Regional County Municipality, in the administrative region of Côte-Nord, in the province of Quebec, in Canada. The course of this river delimits the eastern part of the territory of SÉPAQ Anticosti and the logging zone; the two sections of SÉPAQ Anticosti territory are separated by 82.9 km (51.5 mi).

A forest road runs along the valley of this river. Forestry is the main economic activity in the western part of this area; secondly, recreational tourism activities, especially for the eastern part which is part of the SÉPAQ Anticosti.

== Geography ==
The Petite rivière de la Loutre flows between the rivière aux Loups Marins (located to the east) and the Corbet stream (located to the west).

The Petite rivière de la Loutre draws its source from a very small lake (altitude: 72 m (236 ft)) located in the eastern part of Anticosti Island. This source is located on the southeast side of Lac au Renard (head water body of Rivière au Renard), either at:

- 177.3 km (110.2 mi) east of the town center of the village of Port-Menier;
- 17.8 km (11.1 mi) south of Prinsta Bay, located on the north shore of Anticosti Island;
- 13.1 km (8.1 mi) north of the south shore of Anticosti Island.

From its source, the Petite rivière de la Loutre flows on 13.3 km (8.3 mi) towards the south with a drop of 71 m (233 ft), until its mouth where the current bypasses a small Isle. This mouth is located at the end of a small bay, between Pointe aux Oies (located on the east side) and Pointe de la Croix (located on the west side).

The Petite rivière de la Loutre flows on the south shore of Anticosti Island, that is 25.3 km (15.7 mi) to the south-west of the Pointe de l'Est of the island, and at 177.3 km (110.2 mi) east of the village center of Port-Menier.

== Toponymy ==
The toponym "Petite rivière de la Loutre" was made official on September 12, 1974, at the Place Names Bank of the Commission de toponymie du Québec.

== See also ==
- List of rivers of Quebec
