= Sainte-Marie River =

- Location within Quebec

Location
- Country: Canada
- Province: Quebec
- Region: Côte-Nord
- RCM: Minganie
- Island: Anticosti Island

Physical characteristics
- Source: Lake Sainte-Marie
  - location: L'Île-d'Anticosti
  - coordinates: 49.82408°N 63.86262°W
  - elevation: 61 m (200 ft)
- Mouth: Gulf of Saint Lawrence
  - location: L'Île-d'Anticosti
  - coordinates: 49.67333°N 63.92°W
  - elevation: 1 metre (3 ft 3 in)
- Length: 21.7 km (13.5 mi)

Basin features
- Tributaries
  - left: (upstream) Paul Pond discharge, three streams, Nelson Lake discharge, two streams.
  - right: (upstream) five streams, discharge from Lac de la Tour, a stream.

The Sainte-Marie River (French: Rivière Sainte-Marie) is a tributary of the Gulf of St. Lawrence, flowing in the municipality of L'Île-d'Anticosti, in the Minganie Regional County Municipality, in the administrative region of Côte-Nord, in province of Quebec, in Canada.

The Sainte-Marie River is the most westerly river in the SÉPAQ Anticosti territory. The "Rivière-Sainte-Marie" sports camp was built during the 20th century, west of the mouth of this stream.

The main forest road (east-west) of Anticosti Island serves the upper part of this valley. A network of secondary roads connect to this main road, as well as to the west to a forest road network for forestry purposes.

Forestry is the main economic activity in this area; recreational tourism activities, second.

== Geography ==
The Sainte-Marie river draws its source from Lake Sainte-Marie (length: 0.7 km (0.43 mi) almost round in shape; altitude: 61 m (200 ft)) located in the central-western part of the Anticosti Island. This lake has a marsh area on the north side and the south side. The mouth of Lac Sainte-Marie is located at:

- 36.4 km (22.6 mi) northeast of the town center of the village of Port-Menier;
- 6.0 km (3.7 mi) south-east of the north shore (Martin Bay) of Anticosti Island;
- 16.6 km (10.3 mi) north of the south shore of Anticosti Island.

From its source, the Sainte-Marie River flows south between the Bec-Scie River (located on the west side) and Rivière aux Cailloux (located on the east side). Its course descends on 21.7 km (13.5 mi) towards the south with a drop of 60 m (200 ft), according to the following segments:

- 11.0 km (6.8 mi) towards the south first, passing under the bridge of the main road (east–west direction) of the island, successively collecting a stream (coming from the north-east), the discharge (coming from the west) of Lac de la Tour and the discharge (coming from the east) of Lake Nelson, then crossing Lake Elsie (length: 1.3 km (0.81 mi); altitude: 21 m (69 ft)), up to its mouth;
- 10.7 km (6.6 mi) towards the south entering the territory of the SÉPAQ Anticosti, collecting four streams (coming from the west), two streams (coming from the east) and the discharge (coming from the northeast) of Paul Pond, forming a hook of 0.8 km (0.50 mi) towards the west at the end of the segment, up to its mouth.

The Sainte-Marie river empties on the south shore of Anticosti Island, i.e. 5.3 km (3.3 mi) east of the mouth of Baleine stream, at 1.2 km (0.75 mi) west of Cap Sainte-Marie where the Sainte-Marie river flows and 35.1 km (21.8 mi) east of the center of the village of Port-Menier.

== Toponymy ==
The toponyms "Cap Sainte-Marie", "rivière Sainte-Marie" and "Camp sportif Rivière-Sainte-Marie" are linked.

The toponymic designation “Sainte-Marie River” is one of the oldest on Anticosti Island. It appears on the Map of Canada (or of New France), designed by Guillaume Delisle in 1703. The toponym “Rivière Ste Marie” appears in 1904 on a map drawn up by Joseph Schmitt, designating the watercourse west of the toponym "Falaises Ste Marie".

The Commission de toponymie du Québec believes that this toponym was originally attributed by the explorer Louis Jolliet, who had become the owner of the island since 1680; he would have designated it in honor of his eldest daughter Marie-Charlotte. After becoming the owner of the island, Louis Jolliet spent his summers in the western part of Anticosti Island, where he had built a house.

The toponym "rivière Sainte-Marie" was made official on December 5, 1968.

== See also ==
- List of rivers of Quebec
