= Plantain River =

Location
- Country: Canada
- Province: Quebec
- Region: Côte-Nord
- Regional County Municipality: Minganie Regional County Municipality

Physical characteristics
- Source: Lake Supérieur
  - location: L'Île-d'Anticosti
  - coordinates: 49.88930°N 64.37813°W
  - elevation: 68 m (223 ft)
- Mouth: Gulf of Saint Lawrence
  - location: L'Île-d'Anticosti
  - coordinates: 49°49′51″N 64°22′41″W
  - elevation: 1 m (3.3 ft)
- Length: 8.5 km (5.3 mi)

Basin features
- Tributaries
  - left: (upstream)
  - right: (upstream)

The Plantain River (French: Rivière Plantain) is a tributary of the Gulf of Saint Lawrence, flowing in the municipality of L'Île-d'Anticosti, in the Minganie Regional County Municipality, in the administrative region of Côte-Nord, in province of Quebec, in Canada.

The Plantain River is the westernmost river on Anticosti Island.

== Geography ==
The Plantain River has its source at Lake Superior (length: 1.5 km (0.93 mi); altitude: 34 m (112 ft)) located at the western end of Anticosti Island. The mouth of Lake Superior is located at the end of the bay on the west shore, at:

- 10.8 km (6.7 mi) northeast of Pointe-Ouest of Anticosti Island;
- 7.1 km (4.4 mi) north-west of the town centre of the village of Port-Menier;
- 3.8 km (2.4 mi) south-east of the north shore of Anticosti Island.

From its source, the Plantain River flows south between the western end of Anticosti Island and the Gamache River (located on the east side).

From the mouth of Lake Superior, the course of the Plantain River descends 8.5 km (5.3 mi) towards the south with a drop of 33 m (108 ft), according to the following segments:

- 5.0 km (3.1 mi) first southwest, then southeast across Plantain Lake (length: 3.1 km (1.9 mi); altitude: 28 m (92 ft)), up to its mouth;
- 3.5 km (2.2 mi) towards the south-east, crossing areas of marshes and collecting the Diane stream (coming from the north-east), until its mouth.

The Plantain River flows into the Gulf of Saint Lawrence, via Jolliet Bay which has a width: 1.1 km (0.68 mi) at the entrance to the bay, that is to say at the height of the Pointe of the castle. Jolliet bay turns out to be a sub-element of Gamache bay (length: 5.7 km (3.5 mi); width: 4.2 km (2.6 mi) at the entrance to the bay), on the shore south of Anticosti Island. At low tide, the sandstone at the mouth of the Plantain River can stretch as far as 1.8 km (1.1 mi) towards the centre of the bay.

This confluence of the river and the bay (at high tide) is located at 11.0 km (6.8 mi) east of Pointe aux Pointe-Ouest of Anticosti Island, at 10.7 km (6.6 mi) southeast of the north shore of the island and 2.4 km (1.5 mi) west of the centre of the village of Port-Menier. Gamache bay includes Jolliet bay (located to the northwest) and Navots bay (located to the northeast).

== Toponymy ==
The toponymic designation "rivière Plantain" appears in a volume published in 1904 and also in 1924 in the Bulletin de la Société de Géographie de Québec.

The toponym "Rivière Plantain" was made official on December 5, 1968.

== See also ==
- List of rivers of Quebec
