= Maccan River =

Maccan River may refer to:

- Maccan River (Nova Scotia), a small tidal river tributary of River Hebert, contained completely within Cumberland County, Nova Scotia, Canada
- Maccan River (Anticosti Island), a tributary of the Gulf of Saint Lawrence in L'Île-d'Anticosti, Quebec, Canada
