= Rivière aux Canards (Anticosti Island) =

Location
- Country: Canada
- Province: Quebec
- Region: Côte-Nord
- Regional County Municipality: Minganie Regional County Municipality

Physical characteristics
- Source: Lake Anna
  - location: L'Île-d'Anticosti
  - coordinates: 49.86887°N 64.14786°W
  - elevation: 68 m (223 ft)
- Mouth: Gulf of Saint Lawrence
  - location: L'Île-d'Anticosti
  - coordinates: 49.75028°N 64.22222°W
  - elevation: 1 m (3.3 ft)
- Length: 19.1 km (11.9 mi)

Basin features
- Tributaries
  - left: (upstream) four streams.
  - right: (upstream) stream, discharge from the lakes of Pointe aux Graines.

The rivière aux Canards (English: Ducks River) is a tributary of the Gulf of Saint Lawrence, flowing in the municipality of L'Île-d'Anticosti, in the Minganie Regional County Municipality, in the administrative region of Côte-Nord, in province of Quebec, in Canada.

A forest road runs along the southern coast of Anticosti Island and cuts the "rivière aux Canards" near its mouth. Another forest road (north–south direction) serves the west bank of the lower part of the course of the river.

Forestry is the main economic activity in this area; recreational tourism activities, second.

== Geography ==
The Ducks River has its source at Lake Anna (length: 0.8 km (0.50 mi); altitude: 78 m (256 ft)) located in the western part of Anticosti Island. Lake Anna is fed on the north side by two small lakes. Its mouth is located at the end of the bay on the south shore, at:

- 15.5 km (9.6 mi) northeast of the town center of the village of Port-Menier;
- 14.2 km (8.8 mi) north of the south shore of Anticosti Island;
- 8.3 km (5.2 mi) south of the north shore of Anticosti Island.

From its source, the Canards River flows south between the Trois Milles River (located on the west side); and the La Petite Rivière (located on the east side).

From the mouth of Lake Anna, the course of the Duck River descends 19.1 km (11.9 mi) towards the south with a drop of 77 m (253 ft), according to the following segments:

- 5.1 km (3.2 mi) towards the south, then crossing Lac aux Canards at the end of the segment (length: 1.2 km (0.75 mi); altitude: 64 m (210 ft)) east, to the road running north of Port-Menier airport;
- 10.9 km (6.8 mi) south almost in a straight line and forming small coils, collecting three streams on the east side and three more on the west side, to a stream (coming from the north-west );
- 3.1 km (1.9 mi) towards the south, collecting a stream (coming from the east) and the discharge of the lakes of Pointe aux Graines, up to its mouth.

The Duck River flows into the Gulf of St. Lawrence, at the bottom of a bay (length: 0.4 km (0.25 mi); width at the entrance: 0.5 km (0.31 mi)), on the south shore of Anticosti Island. The sandstone stretches to 0.6 km (0.37 mi) at low tide. This confluence is located 12.1 km (7.5 mi) east of the center of the village of Port-Menier.

== Toponymy ==
This toponymic designation has been in use since at least 1924.

The toponym "rivière aux Canards" was made official on December 5, 1968.

== See also ==
- List of rivers of Quebec
