= Rivière aux Saumons (Anticosti Island) =

Location
- Country: Canada
- Province: Quebec
- Region: Saguenay–Lac-Saint-Jean
- MRC: Le Domaine-du-Roy Regional County Municipality
- Municipality: Saint-Félicien

Physical characteristics
- Source: Unidentified lake
  - location: L'Île-d'Anticosti
  - coordinates: 49°27′55″N 62°50′15″W
  - elevation: 187 m (614 ft)
- Mouth: Gulf of Saint Lawrence
  - location: L'Île-d'Anticosti
  - coordinates: 49°25′13″N 62°14′4″W
  - elevation: 1 m (3.3 ft)
- Length: 48.7 km (30.3 mi)

Basin features
- Tributaries
  - left: (upstream) Stream (from the northeast), stream (from the north), discharge from three lakes, 5 streams from the north, discharge from a lake, discharge (from the north) from several lakes, 2 discharges from the lakes.
  - right: (upstream) 2 discharges from lakes, stream, discharge from several small lakes, discharge from several small lakes, stream (from the southwest), stream (from the west), 2 discharges from lakes.

The rivière aux Saumons (English: Salmon River) is a stream flowing into Gulf of St. Lawrence, flowing in the municipality of L'Île-d'Anticosti, in the Minganie Regional County Municipality, in the administrative region of Côte-Nord, in the province of Quebec, in Canada.

A forest road serves the intermediate and lower part of its course. An airport is set up in the chasms sector to accommodate tourist activities. Forestry is the main economic activity in this area; recreational tourism activities, secondly, in particular salmon fishing and excursions in the sinkhole sector.

== Geography ==
The Rivière aux Saumons takes its source from Rainsford Lake (length: 0.9 km (0.56 mi); altitude: 187 m (614 ft)) located in the center of Anticosti Island. This source is located at:

- 22.6 km (14.0 mi) south of the north shore of the island;
- 30.8 km (19.1 mi) north of the south shore of the island;
- 116.5 km (72.4 mi) east of the town center of the village of Port-Menier;
- 93.1 km (57.8 mi) west of the eastern point of Anticosti Island.

From its source, the Rivière aux Saumons flows over 48.7 km (30.3 mi) with a drop of 186 m (610 ft), entirely in the forest zone in the SÉPAQ zone, according to the following segments:

- 1.4 km (0.87 mi) to the south in the marsh area, first crossing a small lake, then a second lake (length: 0.6 km (0.37 mi); altitude: 186 m (610 ft)) in the shape of a V, where the current turns east after having bypassed a peninsula attached to the north shore, to its mouth;
- 19.3 km (12.0 mi) towards the east, first by forming a small hook towards the south and crossing a marsh area, by collecting two streams (coming from the north), by collecting a stream (coming from the south), passing south of the place called "Champ-des-Gouffres", forming a loop to the south, then a hook towards the north, and another towards the south, collecting the discharge (coming from the north ) from several lakes to a stream (coming from the southwest);
- 20.0 km (12.4 mi) to the northeast by forming two large curves to the southeast, collecting a stream (coming from the southwest) and the outlet (coming from the south) from a small lake, to Poulin stream (coming from the west);
- 8.0 km (5.0 mi) towards the north-east in a deep valley, forming a loop towards the north-west at mid-segment, until its mouth.

The Rivière aux Saumons flows into the bottom of Anse Harvey on the north shore of Anticosti Island. The entrance to this bay is 4.8 km (3.0 mi) wide, between the point of Cap Harvey (west side of the bay) and Pointe à la Batterie (east side of the bay). This bay penetrates the land towards the south on 1.4 km (0.87 mi).

== Toponymy ==
The toponym "Rivière aux Saumons" was formalized on December 5, 1968, at the Place Names Bank of the Commission de toponymie du Québec.

== See also ==
- List of rivers of Quebec
