= Rivière de l'Ours =

Location
- Country: Canada
- Province: Quebec
- Region: Côte-Nord
- MRC: Manicouagan Regional County Municipality
- City: Baie-Comeau

Physical characteristics
- Source: Petit lac
  - location: L'Île-d'Anticosti
  - coordinates: 49°29′57″N 62°38′52″W
  - elevation: 175 m (574 ft)
- Mouth: Gulf of Saint Lawrence
  - location: L'Île-d'Anticosti
  - coordinates: 49°31′47″N 62°27′28″W
  - elevation: 1 m (3.3 ft)
- Length: 15.9 km (9.9 mi)

Basin features
- Tributaries
  - left: Stream (coming from west)

The rivière de l'Ours, also known as Bear River, is a tributary of the Gulf of St. Lawrence, flowing in the municipality of L'Île-d'Anticosti, in the Minganie Regional County Municipality, in the administrative region of Côte-Nord, in the province of Quebec, in Canada.

A forest road serves the upper and intermediate part of its course. Forestry is the main economic activity in this area; recreational tourism, second.

== Geography ==
The Bear River takes its source from a very small lake (altitude: 175 m (574 ft)) located in the center of Anticosti Island. This source is located at:

- 127 km (79 mi) north-east of the town center of the village of Port-Menier;
- 83 km (52 mi) west of the eastern point of Anticosti Island.

From its source, the Bear River flows over 15.9 km (9.9 mi) with a drop of 174 m (571 ft), entirely in the forest area in the SÉPAQ area, according to following segments:

- 4.4 km (2.7 mi) north-east, to a stream (coming from the west);
- 11.5 km (7.1 mi) north-east, to its mouth.

The Bear River flows into the bottom of Bear Bay on the north shore of Anticosti Island. The entrance to this bay is 2.2 km (1.4 mi) wide, between the point of Cap de l'Ours (west side of the bay) and Easton point (east side of the bay). This bay penetrates the land to the south on 1.6 km (0.99 mi).

== Toponymy ==
The toponym "Rivière de l'Ours" was formalized on September 12, 1974, at the Place Names Bank of the Commission de toponymie du Québec.

== See also ==
- List of rivers of Quebec
