= Anticosti Island =

Island in the Gulf of St. Lawrence, Quebec, Canada

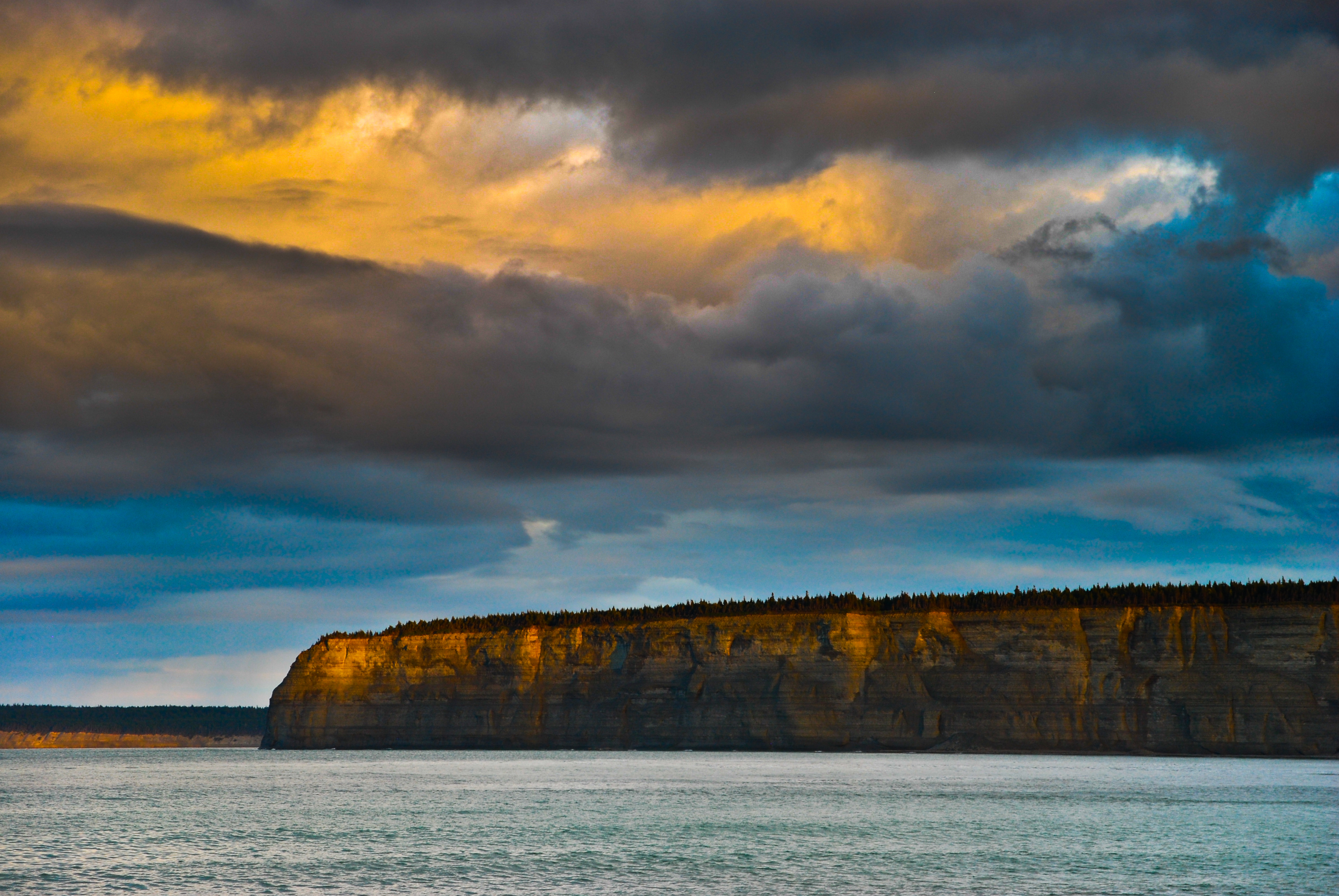
- The rocky coast of the island

- Location within Quebec

Geography
- Location: Gulf of Saint Lawrence
- Coordinates: 49°30′N 63°00′W
- Area: 7,953.55 km^{2} (3,070.88 sq mi) (2026)
- Area rank: 20th in Canada & 90th worldwide
- Length: 222 km (137.9 mi)
- Width: 56 km (34.8 mi)
- Highest elevation: 306 m (1004 ft)
- Highest point: Mont de La Hague

Administration
- Canada
- Province: Quebec
- Region: Côte-Nord
- County: Minganie
- Largest Municipality: L'Île-d'Anticosti

Demographics
- Population: 177 (2021)

UNESCO World Heritage Site
- Criteria: Natural: viii
- Reference: 1686
- Inscription: 2023 (45th Session)
- Area: 18,240 ha (45,100 acres)
- Buffer zone: 89,740 ha (221,800 acres)

Anticosti Island (French pronunciation: [ɑ̃tikɔsti]) is a large but sparsely populated island belonging to the Canadian province of Quebec. It lies in the Gulf of St. Lawrence, and is separated from mainland Quebec by the Jacques Cartier and Honguedo straits. Administratively, it forms a municipality of the Côte-Nord region. The area of the island is 7,953.55 km^{2} (3,070.88 sq mi).

== Toponymy ==
The name Anticosti first appeared in the writings of Samuel de Champlain in 1603, as Anticosty. It apparently represents a corruption of the earlier Nadicousti, recorded by André Thevet in 1586 and described by him as the Amerindian name for the island (the European name, bestowed by Jacques Cartier in 1535, being Isle de l'Assomption). Its origin and meaning are unclear, though William Francis Ganong speculatively ascribed it to the St. Lawrence Iroquoian language. The Montagnais name for the island is Notiskuan, meaning "where bears are hunted", while the Micmac name is Natigôsteg, meaning "forward land".

== History ==
=== Indigenous history ===
For thousands of years, Anticosti Island was the territory of the Indigenous peoples who lived on the mainland and used it as a hunting ground.

=== Colonisation and settlement ===
The French explorer Jacques Cartier sailed along its shore in the summer of 1534. From that time on, France had officially incorporated the island into its colonial empire. The island's first European settlers arrived in 1680 when Louis XIV gave Louis Jolliet the Seigneury of the Mingan Archipelago and Anticosti Island as compensation for reconnoitring the Mississippi and Hudson Bay. Louis Jolliet erected a fort on Anticosti and in the spring of 1681 settled there with his wife, four children and six servants. His fort was captured and occupied during the winter of 1690 by some of the Massachusetts troops of William Phips during their retreat after an unsuccessful attempt to capture Quebec City. After Jolliet's death in 1700, the island was divided among his three sons and the Jolliet family retained ownership until 1763 when the island became part of British North America under the terms of the Treaty of Paris that ended the Seven Years' War. That same year, the island was annexed to Newfoundland until 1774 when it was returned to Lower Canada and annexed again to Newfoundland from 1809 to 1825. It became a part of Quebec (as Lower Canada came to be called) at the Canadian Confederation in 1867. During these years the island property changed hands several times, its owners generally using it for the harvesting of timber; otherwise no real development took place. For example, the French Canadian Gabriel-Elzéar Taschereau owned it among other seigneuries and made money from them.

=== Late 19th-century settlement ===
In 1874, it was bought by the Anticosti Island Company and they founded the villages at English Bay and Fox Bay. Most of the inhabitants, however, continued to be the few keepers of the island's many lighthouses. Because of the number of shipwrecks around the island, stores of provisions were also maintained around the island for sailors who might be washed ashore. In 1882, the Parish of Notre-Dame-de-l'Assomption was founded, a term referring to Cartier's name for the island. In 1884, the island became property of the Stockwell brothers who formed a forestry company two years later. But they were unsuccessful and the company lasted only five years. By the 1890s, the fish and wildlife of the island had been almost eradicated through European overhunting.

=== Henri Menier and private ownership ===
In 1895, Anticosti was sold for $125,000 to French chocolate maker Henri Menier who also leased the shore fishing rights. Menier named the island's 70-metre-high (230 ft) Vauréal Falls after the town of Vauréal in France where he owned a home. He constructed the entire village of Port-Menier, built a cannery for packing fish and lobsters, and attempted to develop its resources of lumber, peat and minerals. Many of the original houses still stand today. Furthermore, he converted the island into a personal game preserve and introduced nonindigenous animals for this purpose, including a herd of 220 white-tailed deer. The deer thrived and today the population exceeds 160,000 while the island's moose population is about 1,000. It has been reported that black bears, which rely on berries to bulk on for the winter, had lived on the island until the introduction, but have disappeared perhaps because of the deer eating the berry bushes bare.

=== Ownership by forestry companies ===
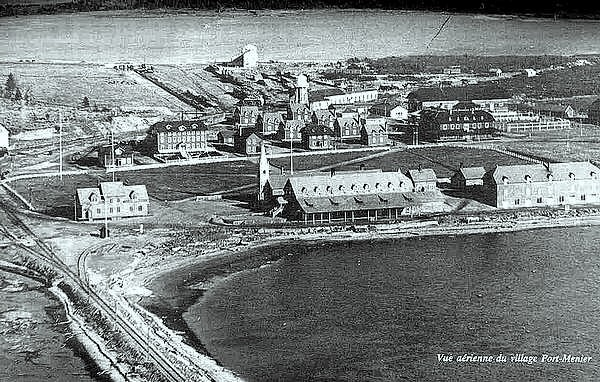
Port Menier village, around 1920

Henri Menier died in 1913 and his brother Gaston became the owner of Anticosti Island. He used and maintained it for a time but eventually decided it was not an economically viable operation and sold it to the Wayagamack Pulp and Paper Company in 1926 for $6,000,000. For the next five decades, the island was used almost exclusively by forestry companies which harvested timber and built some infrastructure, mainly roads, but abandoned the villages at English Bay and Fox Bay.

=== 1930s sale controversy ===
Wayagamack's timber production was successful until the Great Depression when the paper market collapsed. The island property was taken over by Consolidated Paper Corporation Limited in 1931, but they showed little interest in it and put it up for sale. Offers came from Canadian, American, British, French and Belgian parties. In July 1937, an offer was received from a consortium of Dutch and German capitalists who intended to build a sulphite mill and wanted a steady supply of pulpwood and access to Canadian capital. In the autumn of that year, a team of German surveyors travelled to the island to examine its timber and export potential. When this story broke in the Montreal Gazette of 2 December 1937, it caused an immediate controversy since the story claimed that the survey team was really made up of Adolf Hitler's agents and that most were naval, military and fortifications experts. Despite the substantial offer, the promise of thousands of new jobs, and the fact that there were no legal methods to block the sale, the suspicions remained. A committee was set up to investigate the affair but concluded that "there was no evidence to indicate that the project has other than a commercial purpose". However, when the deadline to purchase the island passed on 15 September 1938, the offer expired and controversy died out.

=== Government ownership and management ===
In 1974, the government of Quebec purchased the island from the forestry company Consolidated Bathurst Ltd. for $23,780,000. Anticosti was placed under management by the Ministry of Recreation, Hunting and Fishing (ministère du Loisir de la Chasse et de la Pêche) and in 1983 the process began to set up a working municipal structure. Today, about 60% is under management by Sépaq and since April 2001, 572 km^{2} (221 sq mi) has been designated as a national conservation park. With its 24 rivers and streams bountiful with salmon and trout, the island is now a tourist destination for anglers and hunters, particularly from the United States and Canada, as well as for paleontologists, bird watchers and hikers.

== Geography ==
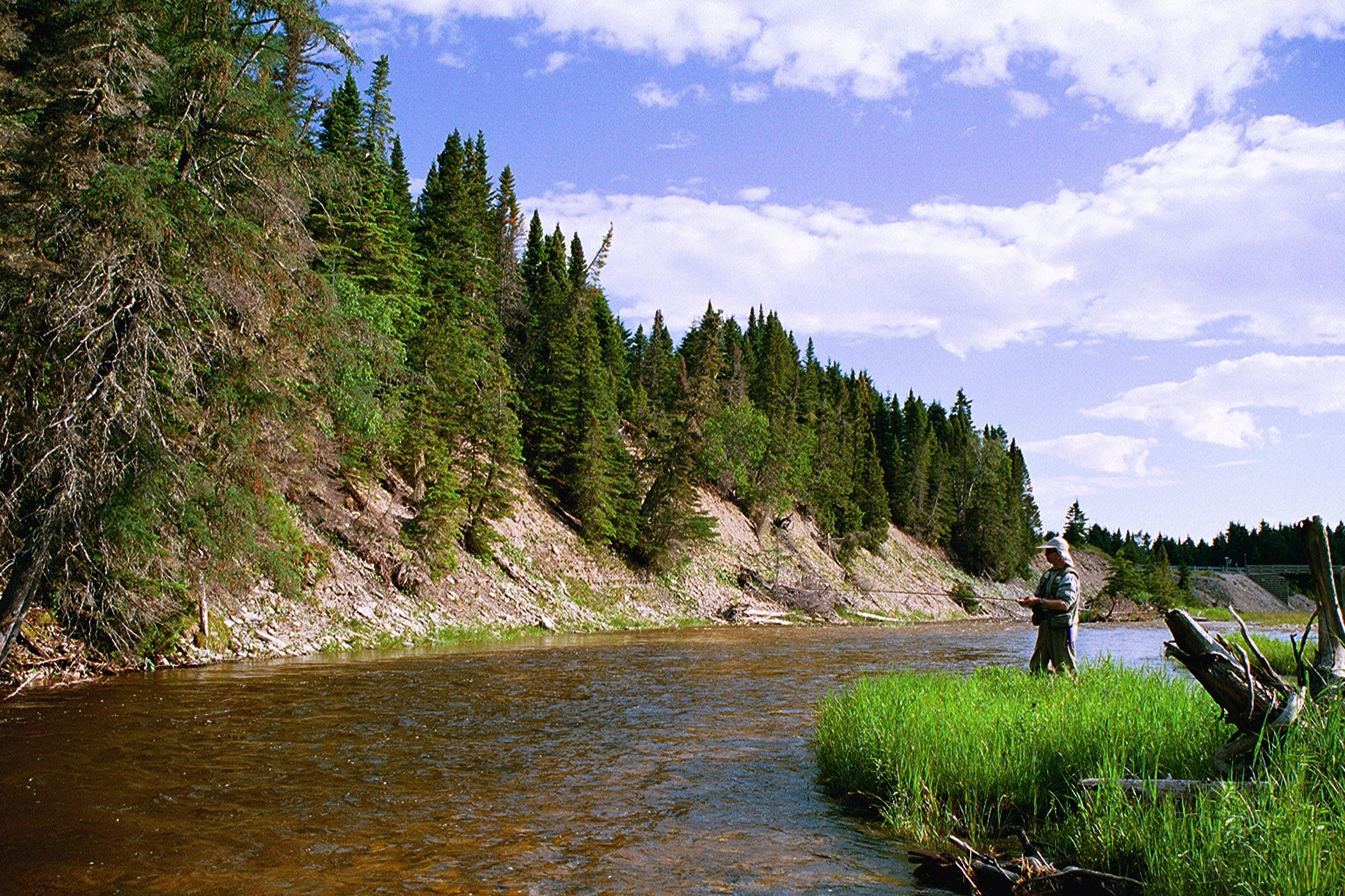
Salmon fisherman on Rivière à l'Huile

Anticosti Island is located in the Gulf of St. Lawrence at the edge of St. Lawrence River estuary. At 7,953.55 km^{2} (3,070.88 sq mi) in size, the island has a length of 222 km (138 mi) and a maximum width of 56 km (35 mi), its highest peak rises to 306 m (1,004 ft). It is the 90th largest island in the world and 20th largest island in Canada. Anticosti Island is separated on the north from the Côte-Nord region of Quebec (the Labrador Peninsula) by the Jacques Cartier Strait, and on the south from the Gaspé Peninsula by the Honguedo Strait. Anticosti Island is larger than Prince Edward Island but sparsely populated (218 people in 2016), with most of the permanent population in the village of Port-Menier on the western tip of the island; this population once consisted chiefly of the keepers of the lighthouses erected by the Canadian government. The entire island constitutes one municipality known as L'Île-d'Anticosti. Due to more than 400 shipwrecks off its coasts, Anticosti Island is sometimes called the "Cemetery of the Gulf". Anticosti Island is part of the eastern St. Lawrence lowlands. It is 222 km (138 mi) long and has a maximum breadth of 56 km (35 mi) — 1 1/2 times as large as the province of Prince Edward Island. Its coastline is 520 km (320 mi) long, and is rocky and dangerous, offering little shelter for ships except in Gamache, Ellis, and Fox Bays. There are large shoals to the south. The largest lake on the island is Lake Wickenden, which feeds the Jupiter River. There are numerous rivers on Anticosti, many of which flow through deep gorges and canyons to the north and south shores. Topographically, Anticosti Island can be divided into three distinct regions: two lowland areas, rarely exceeding 150 metres (490 ft) in elevation, in the eastern and western thirds of the island linked along the coast; and a central highland forming a plateau that rises to just over 300 m (980 ft). This plateau is a unidirectional structure slightly tilted to the south, and is characterized by rolling cuestas. The rocks exposed on the island form a continuous sedimentary stratum more than 2,000 m (6,600 ft) thick. These are the most complete strata in eastern North America of the Ordovician and Silurian periods. The main rivers are: South shore of Anticosti Island (from west to east):

- Plantain River
- Gamache River (Anticosti Island)
- Trois Milles River
- Rivière aux Canards (Anticosti Island)
- La Petite Rivière (Anticosti Island - Western part)
- Rivière aux Graines (Anticosti Island)
- Bec-Scie River
- Sainte-Marie River (Anticosti Island)
- Rivière aux Cailloux
- Sainte Anne River (Anticosti Island)
- Rivière à la Loutre (Anticosti Island)
- Rivière au Fusil
- Jupiter River
- Rivière à la Chute (Anticosti Island)
- Rivière du Brick
- Galiote River
- Rivière aux Rats (Anticosti Island)
- Chicotte River
- Rivière aux Plats
- Pavillon River
  - Pavillon East River
- Ferrée River (Anticosti Island)
- Maccan River (Anticosti Island)
- Bilodeau River
- Little Chaloupe River
- Chaloupe River (Anticosti Island)
- Dauphiné River
- Bell River (Anticosti Island)
- Petite rivière de la Loutre
- Loups Marins River (Anticosti Island)
- Cormoran River
- La Petite Rivière (Anticosti Island - Eastern part)

North shore of Anticosti Island (from west to east):

- Huile River
- Patate River
- Observation River
- Vauréal River
- Des Petits Jardins River
- Rivière de l'Ours
- Natiscotec River
- Métallique River
- Rivière aux Saumons (Anticosti Island)
- Schmitt River
- Prinsta River
- Renard River (Anticosti Island)

=== Climate ===
Anticosti Island has a subarctic climate (Köppen Dfc), affected by the maritime influence of the Gulf of St. Lawrence which reduces seasonal temperature variation. The average annual temperature is 2.0 °C (35.6 °F). The month of July is the warmest with an average temperature of 15.3 °C or 59.5 °F. Conversely, February is the coldest month, averaging −10.9 °C or 12.4 °F. Snowfall is abundant, usually accumulating over 3 metres or 120 inches in the western and central parts.

Climate data for Port Menier (1951-1980)
Month	Jan	Feb	Mar	Apr	May	Jun	Jul	Aug	Sep	Oct	Nov	Dec	Year
Record high °C (°F)	7.2 (45.0)	8.3 (46.9)	10.0 (50.0)	18.3 (64.9)	24.4 (75.9)	31.1 (88.0)	27.8 (82.0)	28.9 (84.0)	25.6 (78.1)	20.6 (69.1)	13.9 (57.0)	11.1 (52.0)	31.1 (88.0)
Mean daily maximum °C (°F)	−6.2 (20.8)	−5.7 (21.7)	−1.8 (28.8)	3.5 (38.3)	9.3 (48.7)	15.8 (60.4)	19.0 (66.2)	18.0 (64.4)	13.6 (56.5)	8.1 (46.6)	2.7 (36.9)	−3.5 (25.7)	6.1 (43.0)
Daily mean °C (°F)	−10.5 (13.1)	−10.9 (12.4)	−5.9 (21.4)	−0.5 (31.1)	5.5 (41.9)	11.2 (52.2)	15.3 (59.5)	13.9 (57.0)	9.8 (49.6)	4.4 (39.9)	−0.7 (30.7)	−7.3 (18.9)	2.0 (35.6)
Mean daily minimum °C (°F)	−15 (5)	−16.1 (3.0)	−10.7 (12.7)	−4.4 (24.1)	1.4 (34.5)	6.6 (43.9)	11.5 (52.7)	9.7 (49.5)	5.8 (42.4)	0.6 (33.1)	−4.0 (24.8)	−10.9 (12.4)	−2.1 (28.2)
Record low °C (°F)	−36.7 (−34.1)	−37.8 (−36.0)	−38.3 (−36.9)	−21.7 (−7.1)	−12.2 (10.0)	−5.0 (23.0)	0.6 (33.1)	0.6 (33.1)	−6.7 (19.9)	−11.1 (12.0)	−21.1 (−6.0)	−31.7 (−25.1)	−38.3 (−36.9)
Average precipitation mm (inches)	79.5 (3.13)	65.6 (2.58)	53.6 (2.11)	54.3 (2.14)	75.1 (2.96)	79.6 (3.13)	85.0 (3.35)	80.8 (3.18)	86.8 (3.42)	92.5 (3.64)	81.0 (3.19)	74.1 (2.92)	907.9 (35.74)
Average rainfall mm (inches)	11.7 (0.46)	7.5 (0.30)	6.4 (0.25)	26.1 (1.03)	69.9 (2.75)	79.6 (3.13)	85.0 (3.35)	80.8 (3.18)	86.8 (3.42)	85.6 (3.37)	55.5 (2.19)	15.1 (0.59)	610.0 (24.02)
Average snowfall cm (inches)	78.4 (30.9)	62.1 (24.4)	51.9 (20.4)	28.8 (11.3)	5.2 (2.0)	0.0 (0.0)	0.0 (0.0)	0.0 (0.0)	0.0 (0.0)	6.0 (2.4)	30.5 (12.0)	64.9 (25.6)	327.8 (129.1)
Average precipitation days (≥ 0.2 mm)	16	12	10	11	11	10	12	11	10	12	12	14	141
Average rainy days (≥ 0.2 mm)	3	1	2	6	10	10	12	11	10	12	7	2	86
Average snowy days (≥ 0.2 cm)	14	10	9	5	1	0	0	0	0	1	6	13	59
Average relative humidity (%)	79	79	80	80	76	76	82	85	85	85	85	81	81
Average dew point °C (°F)	−12.9 (8.8)	−13.4 (7.9)	−8.4 (16.9)	−3.4 (25.9)	1.0 (33.8)	7.3 (45.1)	11.6 (52.9)	11.3 (52.3)	7.0 (44.6)	1.9 (35.4)	−2.4 (27.7)	−8.7 (16.3)	−0.8 (30.6)
Mean monthly sunshine hours	77.6	121.0	137.0	163.8	243.2	243.8	243.8	253.2	172.4	127.4	95.5	62.8	1,941.5
Source: Environment Canada

=== Flora and fauna ===
==== Flora ====
Every summer from 1924 to 1928, Brothers of the Christian Schools Marie-Victorin and Rolland-Germain explored the Anticosti-Minganie. The two botanists made many discoveries, including Senecio pseudo-arnica var. rollandii or Senecio rollandii as well as the Mingan thistle Cirsium minganense and Botrychium minganense. The botanists explored the coasts of Anticosti Island aboard a refurbished old fishing vessel, the Virginia. The archives of the University of Montreal present on Flickr: Anticosti, a land of immense spaces, the sea all around and a social world of the 1920s gone forever, series of photos by Marie-Victorin: Brother Kirouac (1885–1944). In 2004, the island's vascular flora was estimated at 700 species. Rare Plants of the Mingan Archipelago, Parks Canada 2023, said that nearly a tenth of Anticosti Island's flora are rare plants, most of which colonize open habitats associated with rivers (cliffs, taluses or pebbled surfaces) and mineral bogs. Anticosti Island is home to the rare orchid, Cypripedium arietinum Ait. f. (Cypripède tête-de-bélier; ram's head lady's slipper). While populations are declining elsewhere in eastern North America, the orchid flourishes here abundantly, making Anticosti a refuge for this plant. The forests of Anticosti Island are typical boreal forest, with common species such as white spruce, balsam fir, and black spruce. It is distinguished by some minor stands of American white birch and trembling aspen.

- Picea glauca (Moench) Voss (Épicéa glauque, Épinette blanche; white spruce).
- Abies balsamea (Linné) Miller (Sapin baumier, Sapin; balsam fir).
- Picea mariana (Miller) BSP (Épicéa marial, Épinette noire; black spruce).
- Betula papyrifera Marshall (Bouleau à papier, Bouleau blanc, Bouleau à cannot; canoë birch, American white birch).
- Populus tremuloides Michaux (Peuplier faux-tremble, Tremble; aspen).

Balsam fir is slowly being replaced with white spruce because of intensive grazing done by white-tailed deer and by periodic outbreaks of hemlock looper and spruce budworm. About a quarter of the island is covered by peat lands.

Flora on the island, overview

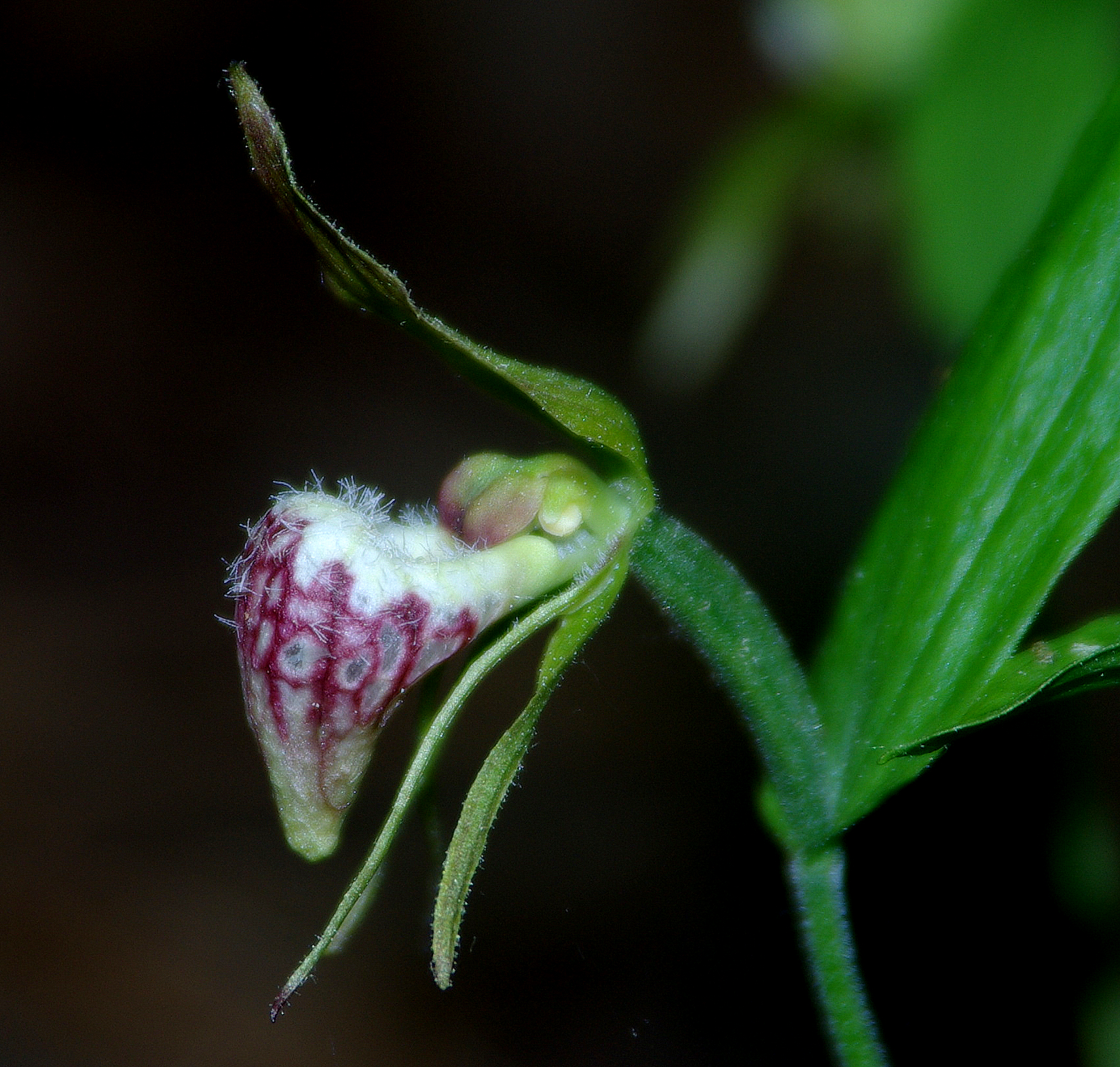
Cypripedium arietinum Ait. f.

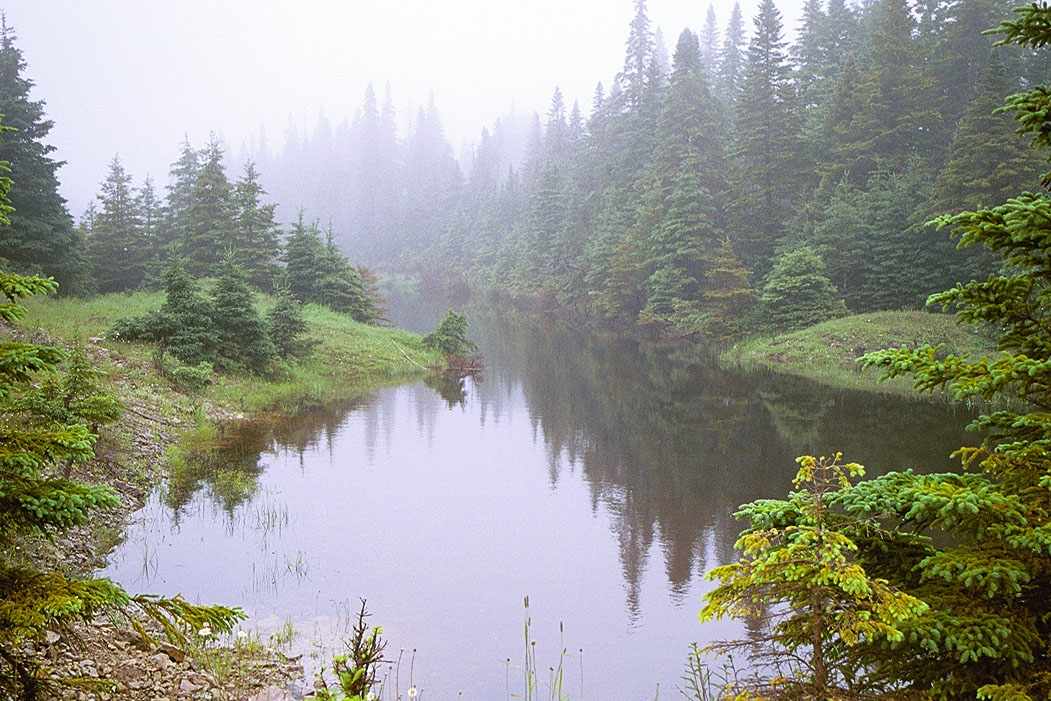
Boreal forest

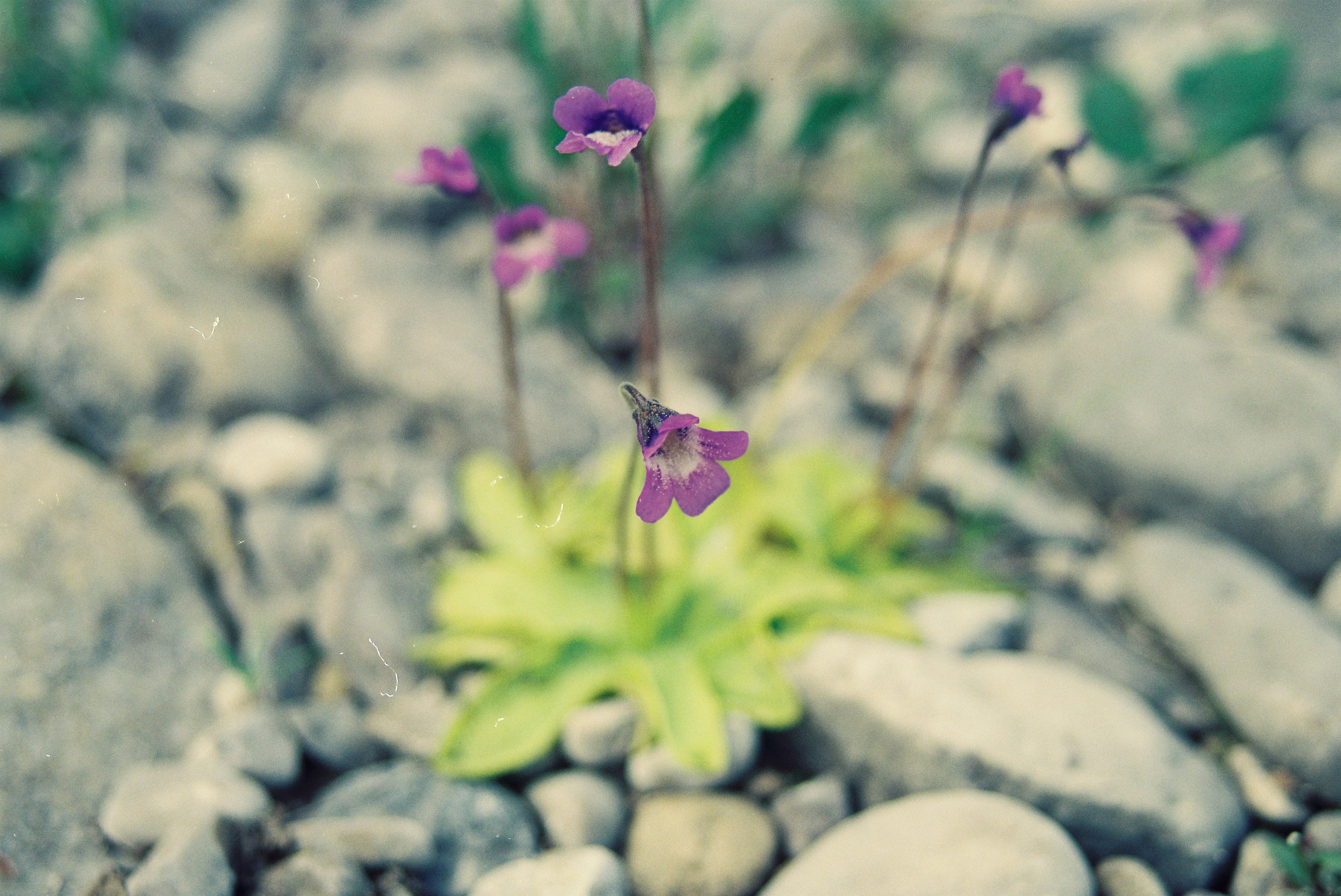
Pinguicula vulgaris L. (Grassette vulgaire; common butterwort). Carnivorous plant, Mc Donald River bank

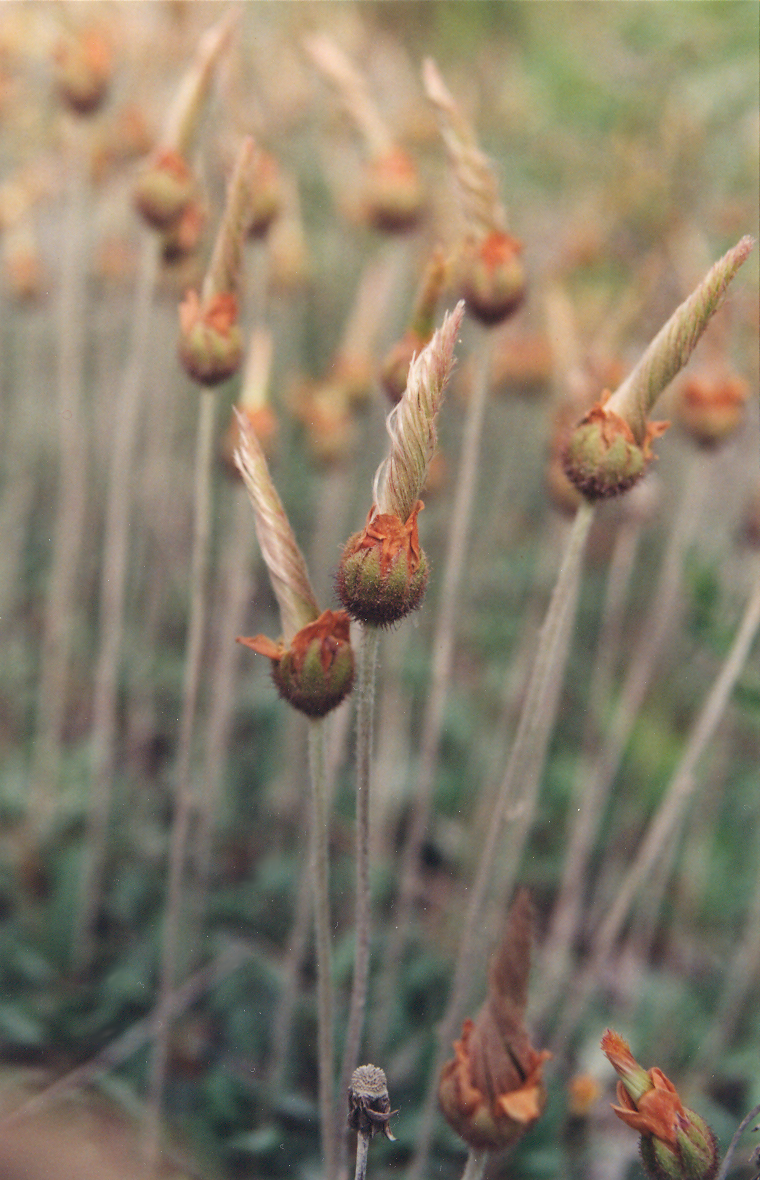
Dryas drummondii Richardson. (Dryade de Drummond; Drummond's mountain-avens), Trans-Anticosti Route, km 144, secteur Vauréal

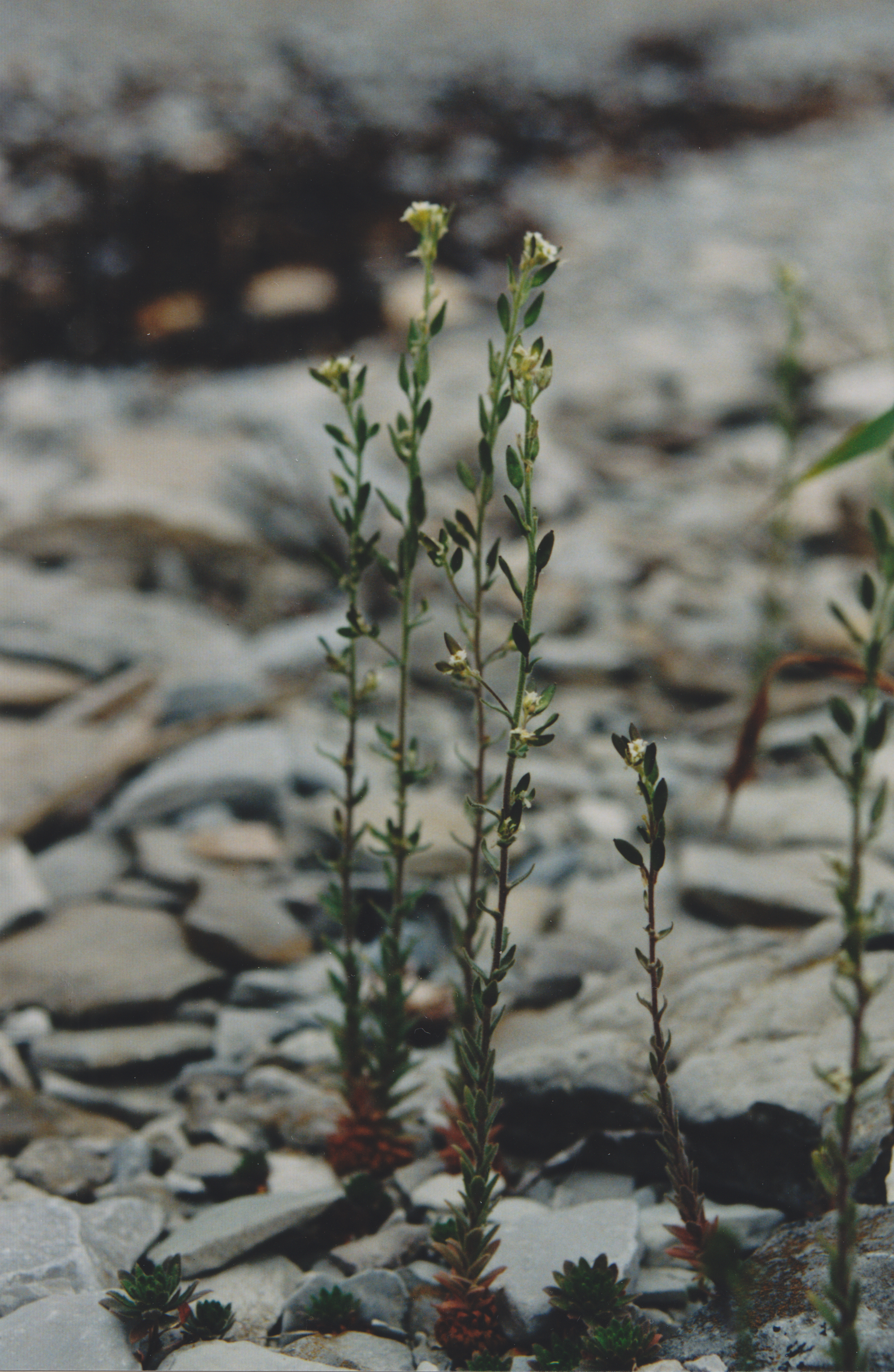
Draba incana L. (Drave blanchâtre; twisted whitlow grass), pebbles and limestone rocks, shore at Baie-Sainte-Claire

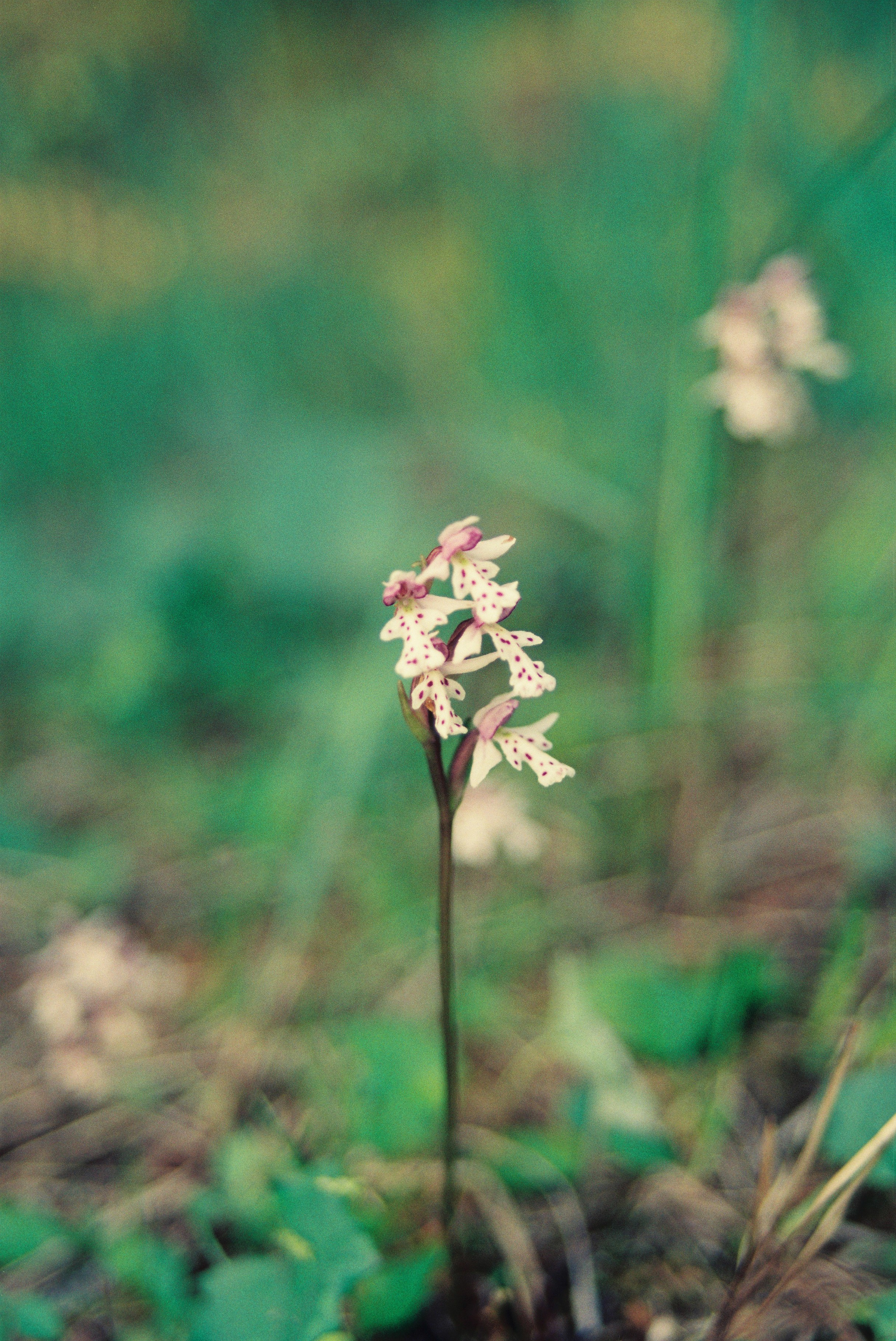
Orchis rotundifolia (Orchis à feuille ronde; small round-leaved orchid), Mc Donald River bank

=== Fauna ===
In Anticosti Island, the wildlife is characteristic of an isolated marine environment. Of the 24 mammal species, 14 or 15 of these are marine mammals, including seals:

- Halichoerus grypus (Phoque gris; grey seal).
- Phoca vitulina (Phoque commun; harbour seal).

Various cetaceans, even large species, ply the nearby cold waters. Thirteen species of cetaceans frequent the waters of the Estuary of St. Lawrence and the Gulf of St. Lawrence:

1. Hyperoodon ampullatus (Hypéroodon boreal, Hypéroodon arctique; northern bottlenose whale).
2. Delphinapterus leucas (Béluga, Bélouga, Baleine blanche, Dauphin blanc, Marsouin blanc; beluga whale).
3. Physeter macrocephalus (Grand cachalot, Cachalot, Cachalot macrocéphale; sperm whale).
4. Lagenorhynchus acutus (Lagénorhynque à flancs blancs, Dauphin à flancs blancs; Atlantic white-sided dolphin).
5. Lagenorhynchus albirostris (Dauphin à nez blanc, Dauphin à bec blanc, Lagénorhynque à bec blanc; white-beaked dolphin).
6. Orcinus orca (Orque, Épaulard; Killer Whale).
7. Globicephala melas (Globicéphale commun, Globicéphale noir, Dauphin pilote; long-finned pilot whale).
8. Phocoena phocoena (Marsouin commun, Cochon de mer, Dieu des mers; harbour porpoise).
9. Eubalaena glacialis (Baleine franche de l'Atlantique nord, Baleine noire de l'Atlantique nord, Baleine de Biscaye; North Atlantic right whale).
10. Balaenoptera acutorostrata (Petit rorqual; minke whale).
11. Balaenoptera musculus (Baleine bleue, Rorqual bleu; blue whale).
12. Megaptera novaeangliae (Rorqual à bosse, Baleine à bosse; humpback whale).
13. Balaenoptera physalus (Rorqual commun; fin whale).

Originally, there were probably only seven indigenous species of land mammals; Martes americana and Ursus americanus have now been extirpated:

- Vulpes vulpes (Renard roux; red fox), including melanistic individuals.
- Lontra canadensis (Loutre de rivière; river otter).
- Peromyscus maniculatus (Souris sylvestre, souris du soir; deer mouse).
- Martes americana (Martre d'Amérique; American marten).
- Ursus americanus (Ours noir; black bear).
- Myotis lucifugus (Petite chauve-souris brune; little brown bat).
- Eptesicus nilssonii (Sérotine de Nilsson, sérotine boréale; northern bat).

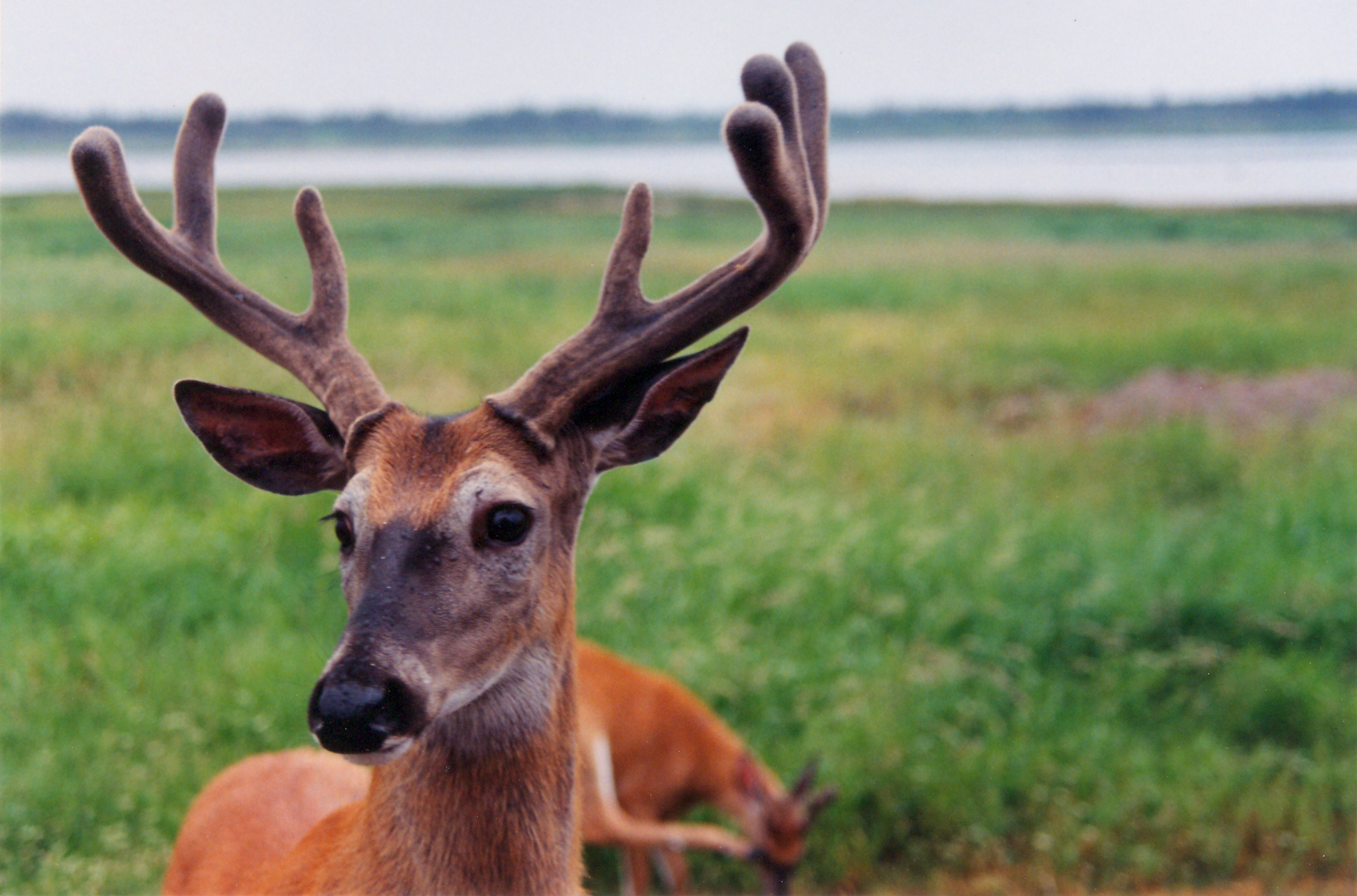
Odocoileus virginianus (Cerf de Virginie, chevreuil; white-tailed deer). Port-Menier (village)

In order to make Anticosti Island a hunter's "paradise", several animal species have been introduced; starting in 1896, the island became an unprecedented biological experiment. In all, sixteen introduced species have been attempted, with six proving to be unsuccessful, namely bison, caribou, elk, mink and fisher. However, for ten species, it has been a beneficial introduction; six species of terrestrial mammals (white-tailed deer, moose, beaver, snowshoe hare and muskrat), two species of frogs, and two species of non-migratory birds (ruffed grouse and the spruce grouse). Of all these species introduced, the "success" of white-tailed deer is particularly noteworthy. From an initial group of about 200 (introduced in 1896 and 1897), the number of white-tailed deer has grown to an estimated 37,000 animals in 2018, representing a density of 4.7 deer/km^{2}. Without predators, this man-made deer population has had noticeable impacts on the island ecosystem. Balsam fir trees covered about 40% of the island, prior to the introduction of the deer. The deer eat tender sprouts from the ground, and prevent fir regeneration; in turn, the firs are being replaced by white spruce. The brook trout, Atlantic salmon and American eel visit the island's shores and swim up several rivers of the island. Some 221 bird species, distributed among 21 avian families, have been observed on Anticosti Island. It is home to nearly 60% of the known breeding sites of the bald eagle in the province of Quebec.

Off the island, in the cold waters of the Gulf of St. Lawrence

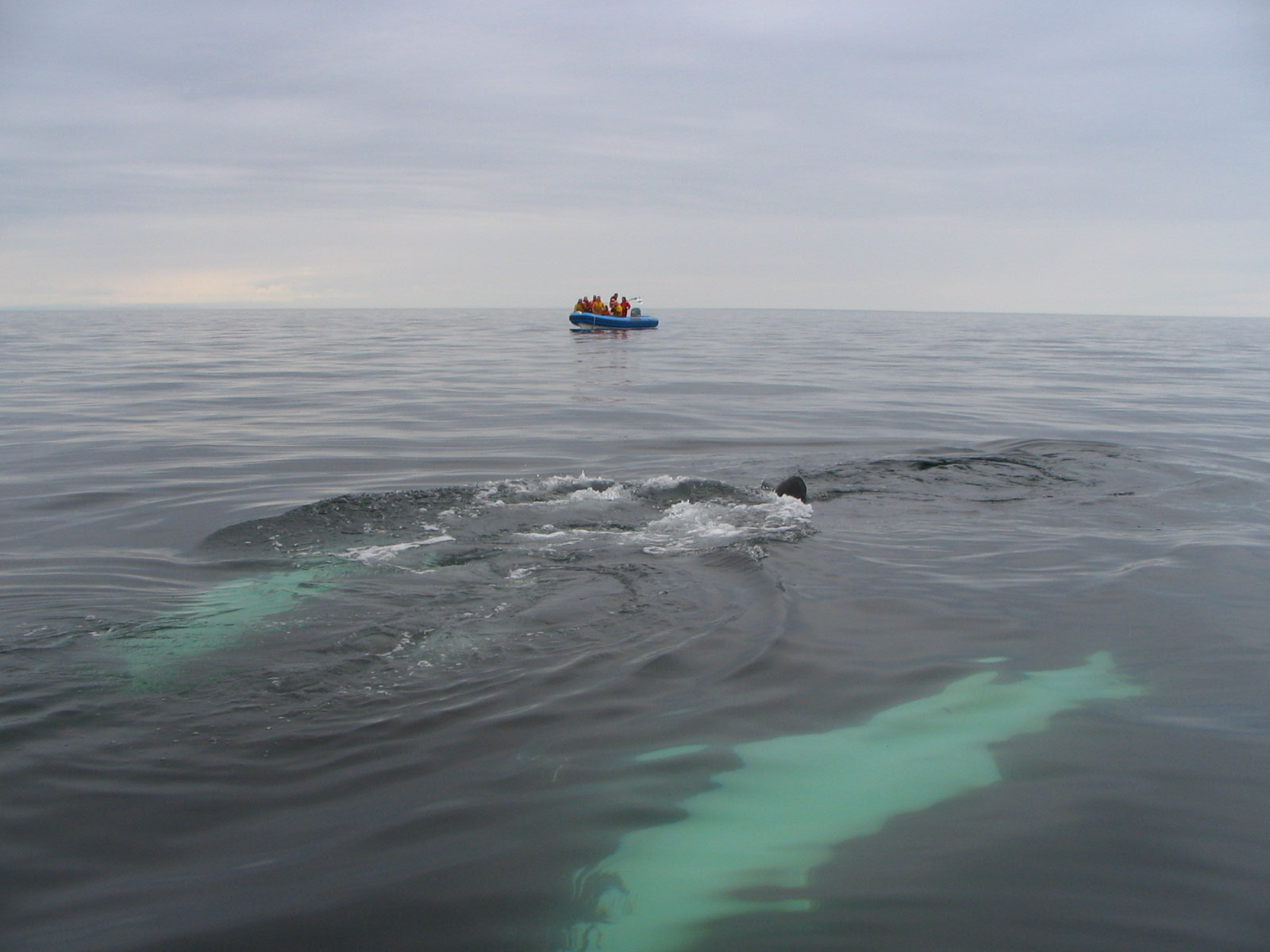
Whale Research Expeditions with Mingan Island Cetacean Study (MICS),

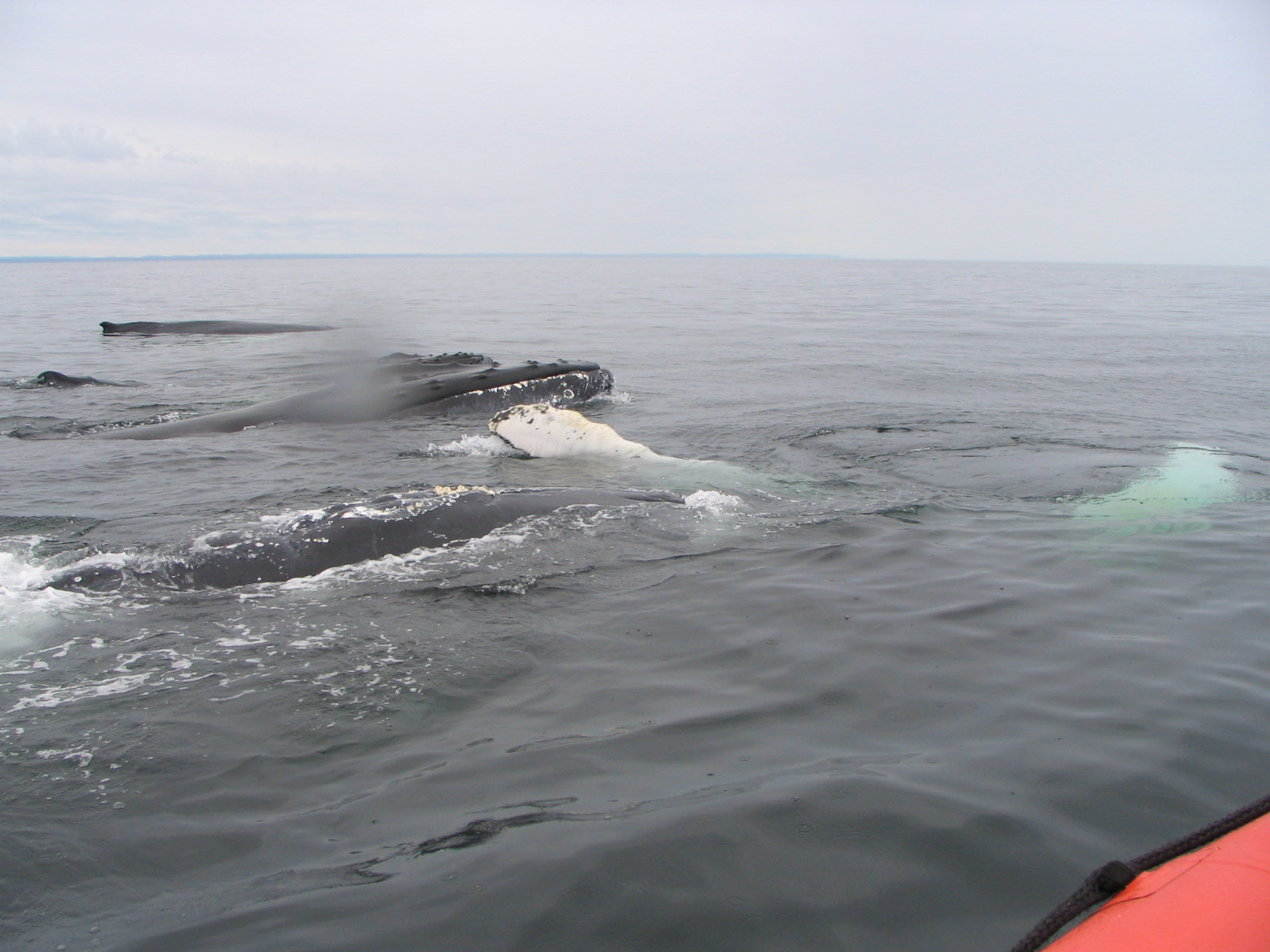
Humpback whales, females and cubs, Whale Research Expeditions with Mingan Island Cetacean Study (MICS)

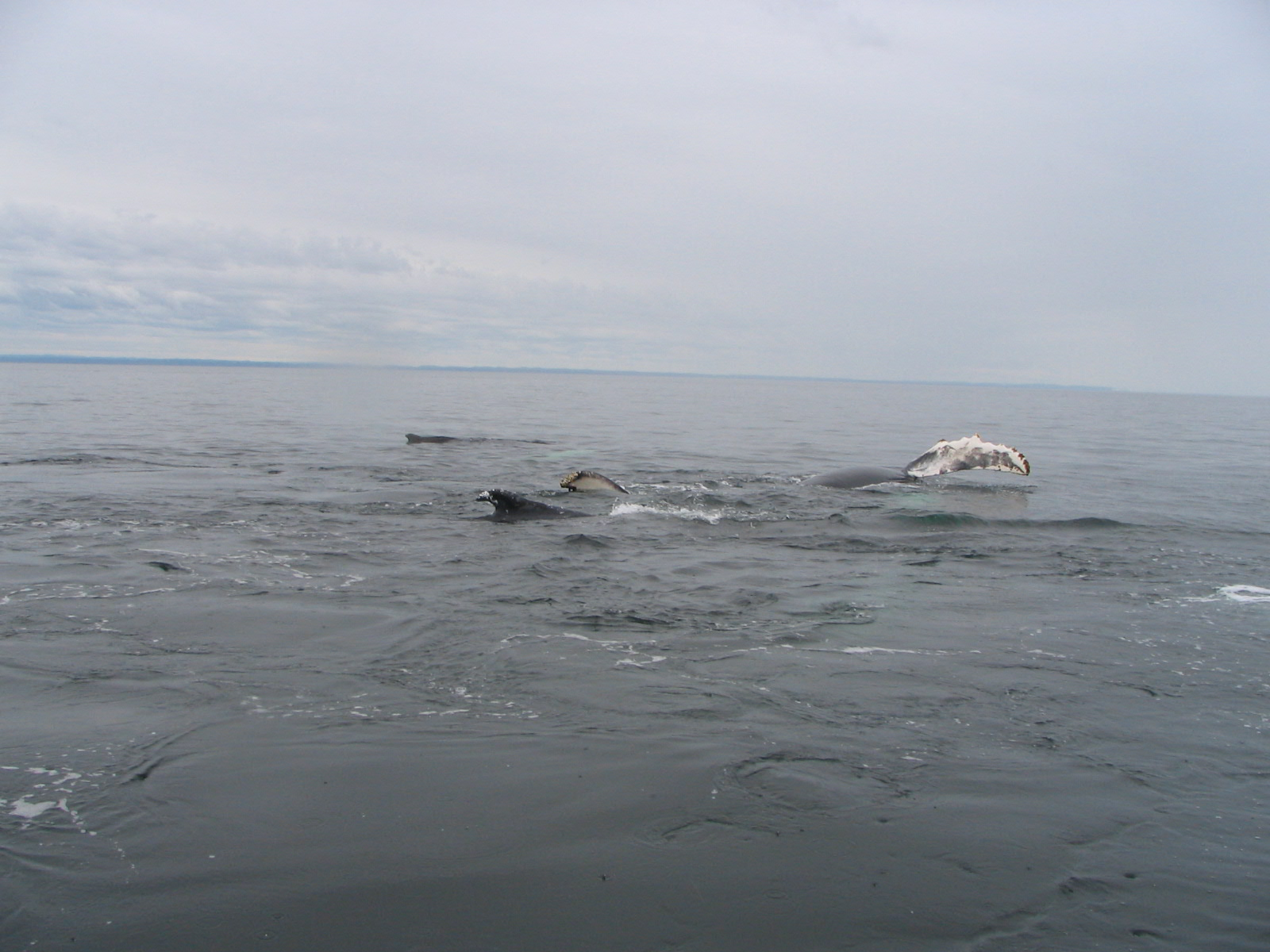
Humpback whales, dorsals, pectoral fins, Whale Research Expeditions with Mingan Island Cetacean Study (MICS)

== Access and transportation ==
Access to the island is either by boat or plane. From April to mid-January, the commercial shipping company Relais Nordik services Port-Menier twice weekly with a passenger and cargo vessel. The Port-Menier Airport is serviced by Air Liaison which provides regular scheduled flights to Sept-Îles and Havre-St-Pierre. There are two other aerodromes on the island, both towards the eastern end. Rivière-aux-Saumons (CTH7) is located on the northern side of the island and was paved in July 2010; Rivière Bell (CRB5) is gravel and is located on the southern side. These are used by outfitters and charter companies that provide private air services during the tourist season. The Henri-Menier Road or Transanticostienne Road, the island's unpaved main road, stretches from Port-Menier to the eastern tip, with numerous forest roads branching off to provide access to various tourist locations and logging concessions. Car rental is available in Port-Menier.

== Tourism ==
Because of its untamed wilderness and abundant wildlife, Anticosti Island is known for its hunting, fishing and outdoor opportunities and it attracts some 3,000 to 4,000 hunters per year. Most of Anticosti Island (4,213 km^{2} or 1,627 sq mi) is under management by Sépaq Anticosti, a division of the provincial parks and wildlife reserves agency Sépaq. It actively promotes tourism on the island, in particular hunting and fishing tours. Another 572 km^{2} (221 sq mi) is protected in the Anticosti National Park (Parc national d'Anticosti). In addition to hunting and fishing, many other outdoor recreational activities are supported in this park, such as hiking, horseback riding, nature viewing and sea kayaking. There are also five commercial outfitters that hold exclusive hunting and fishing rights to 7,263 km^{2} (2,804 sq mi) of the island.

== UNESCO's World Heritage designation ==
Anticosti Island was inscribed on UNESCO's World Heritage List on 19 September 2023. According to UNESCO, the fossil record on Anticosti Island is the most complete palaeontological record representing the first mass extinction of animal life on a global scale, approximately 447–437 million years ago. The World Heritage Site includes the entire coastline of Anticosti Island, except for the area surrounding the village of Port-Menier. It also includes the banks of the Jupiter River and the Vauréal River. A buffer zone extending one kilometre inland from the coastline and riverbanks forms part of the protected area.

The site contains well-preserved, abundant, and diverse fossil fauna within protected areas free from industrial activity.

Vauréal Canyon

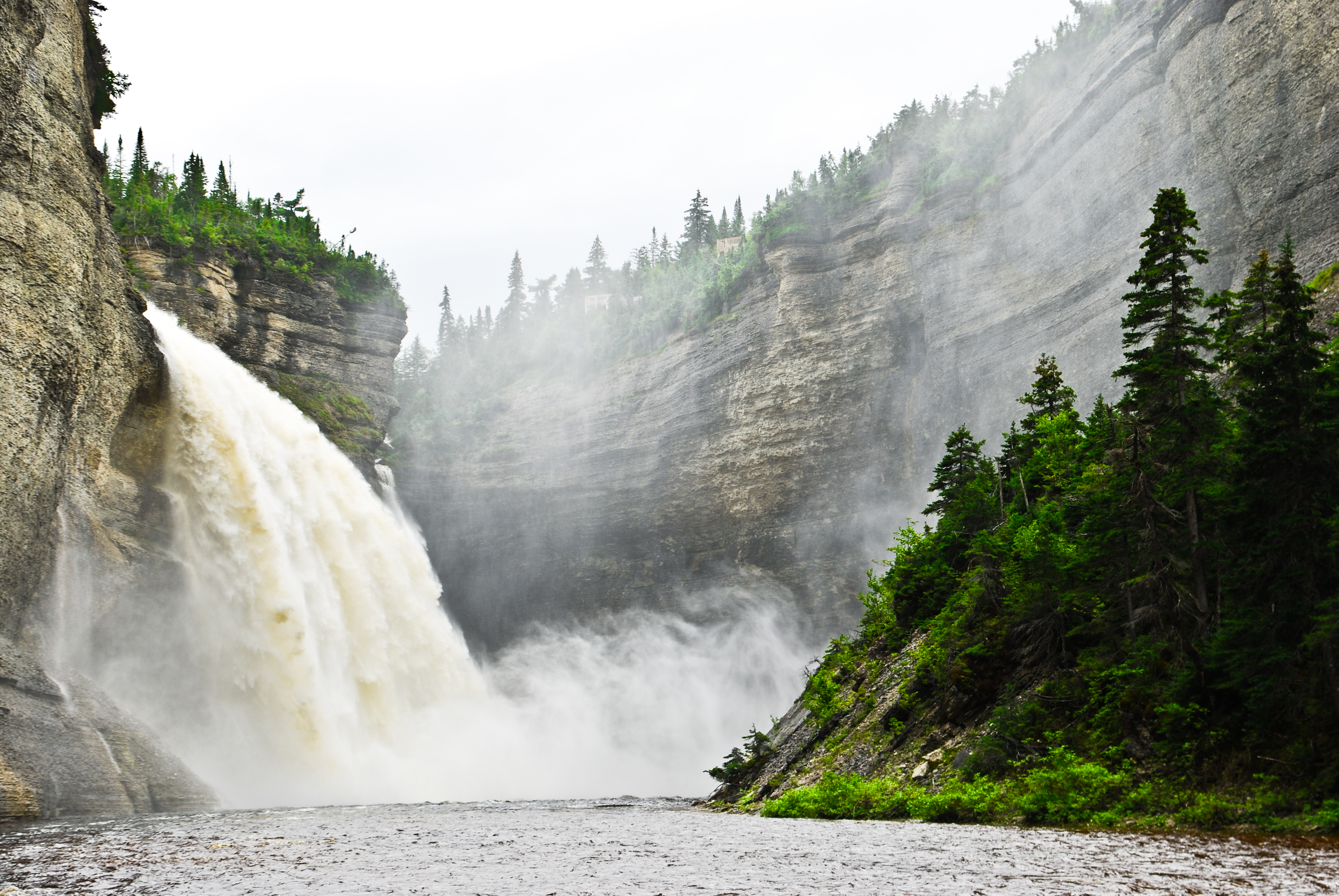
Cliff wall, fall and Vauréal River

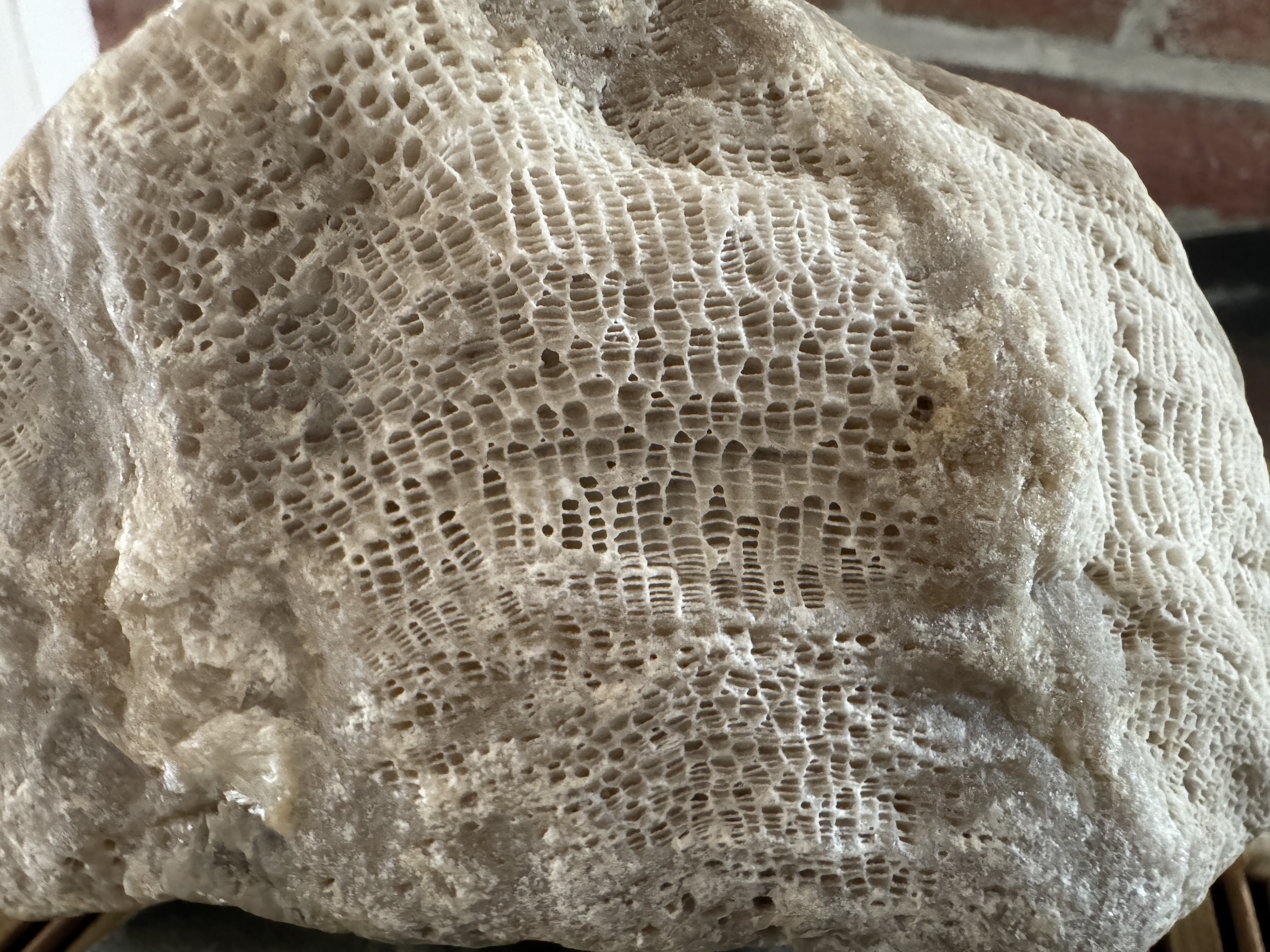
Fossil tabulate coral, in the gravel, at the foot of the wall

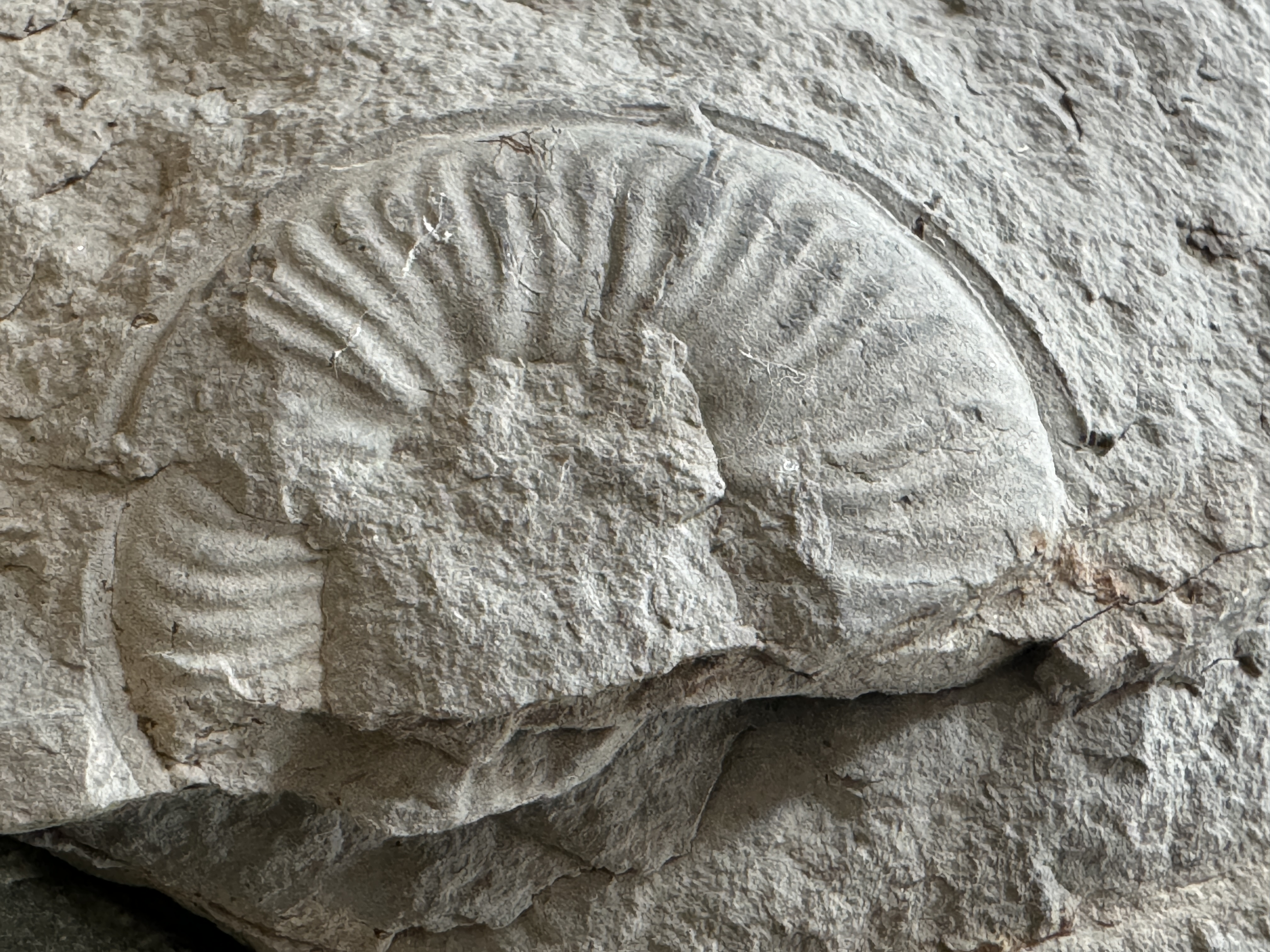
Fossil to be identified, in the gravel, at the foot of the wall

The Vauréal River, with its source in Lake Vauréal, flows 25 km, south then northeast, in the eastern part of the island. The salmon go up the river to the Vauréal Falls, 13 km from the coast, crossing the Vauréal canyon where the river is enclosed between two limestone walls.

== Utica Shale ==
The Utica Shale, a stratigraphical unit of Middle Ordovician age that is potentially rich in shale gas reserves, underlies the Anticosti Islands and extends to surrounding areas in Quebec, Ontario and much of northeastern United States. On February 8, 2011, the citizen group "Non au Pétrole et au Gaz au Québec" released one of the biggest petitions in Quebec history against fracking in the province of Quebec with 128,000 signatures thinking it would prevent the oil and gas exploration on Anticosti. In June 2011, the Quebec firm Pétrolia claimed to have discovered about 30 billion barrels of oil on the island of Anticosti, which is the first time that significant reserves have been found in the province. In February 2014, Premier of Quebec Pauline Marois announced that the provincial government would help finance two exploratory shale gas operations as a prelude to hydraulic fracturing on the island, with the province pledging $115-million to finance drilling for two separate joint ventures in exchange for rights to 50% of the licences and 60% of any commercial profit. It was the first oil and gas deal of any size for the province. With the change in government that occurred in April 2014, the Liberals of Philippe Couillard could change that decision. Petrolia Inc., Corridor Resources and Maurel & Prom formed one joint-venture, while Junex Inc. was still seeking a private partner. On June 4, 2013, the citizen group "Non au Pétrole et au Gaz au Québec", realizing that fracking continued to be a viable method of oil extraction on Anticosti, released another petition that garnered 26,000 signatures against fracking, exploration and exploitation of oil and gas on Anticosti Island and asked for a moratorium and an environmental evaluation. Geological engineer Marc Durand gave a presentation at a conference explaining that a minimum of 12,000 wells would be necessary for this exploitation and would put Quebec in debt, considering the 12 million dollar cost of one of these wells. A year later, when Pauline Marois announced an investment of 115 million dollars for Petrolia to continue the exploration, the same petition increased up to 36,000 signatures. The government started a BAPE (environmental evaluation) specific for Anticosti and the report, published on October 3, 2022, is in favour of creating a protected area on the island.

== See also ==
- Henri de Miffonis
- List of islands of Quebec
- Maritime Quebec

== Bibliography ==
- Baynes, Thomas Spencer, ed. (1878). "Anticosti" . Encyclopædia Britannica . Vol. II (9th ed.). New York: Charles Scribner's Sons. p. 127.
- Chisholm, Hugh, ed. (1911), "Anticosti" , Encyclopædia Britannica, vol. 2 (11th ed.), Cambridge University Press, p. 123
- MacKay, Donald (1979). Anticosti: The Untamed Island (registration required). Toronto: McGraw-Hill Ryerson. ISBN 0-07-082933-0.
- McCormick, Charlie (1996). Anticosti. Éditions JCL. ISBN 2-89431-152-4.
- Pew, Alberta C.; Joseph N. Pew, Jr., Margaret R. Leisenring, Edward B. Leisenring, Jay Cooke (1935). A.E.F.: Anticosti Expeditionary Force. Philadelphia?: Privately printed. Account of a private fishing expedition to the island.
- Schmitt, Joseph (1904). Monographie de l'Ile d'Anticosti (Golfe Saint-Laurent) (in French). Paris: Librairie scientifique A. Hermann. OCLC 191970217.
