= Bec-Scie River =

- Location within Quebec

Location
- Country: Canada
- Province: Quebec
- Region: Côte-Nord
- RCM: Minganie
- Island: Anticosti Island

Physical characteristics
- Source: Lake Valiquette
  - location: L'Île-d'Anticosti
  - coordinates: 49.83214°N 63.92689°W
  - elevation: 83 m (272 ft)
- Mouth: Gulf of Saint Lawrence
  - location: L'Île-d'Anticosti
  - coordinates: 49.71667°N 64.05556°W
  - elevation: 1 metre (3 ft 3 in)
- Length: 13.9 km (8.6 mi)

Basin features
- Tributaries
  - left: (upstream) five streams, stream (via Faure lake).
  - right: (upstream) discharge from some marshes and lakes including Castor Lake, four streams, discharge from the lake.

The Rivière Bec-Scie is a tributary of the Gulf of Saint Lawrence, flowing in the municipality of L'Île-d'Anticosti, in the Minganie Regional County Municipality, in the administrative region of Côte-Nord, in province of Quebec, in Canada.

The Bec-Scie river turns out to be the last river flowing south in the western part of the island before the territory of SÉPAQ Anticosti.

The main forest road (east-west) of Anticosti Island serves the upper part of this valley. A network of secondary roads connect to this main road, as well as to the west to a forest road network for forestry purposes.

Forestry is the main economic activity in this area; recreational tourism activities, second.

== Geography ==
The Bec-Scie river has its source at Lake Valiquette (length: 1.6 km (0.99 mi); altitude: 83 m (272 ft)) located in the western part of Anticosti Island. The mouth of Lake Valiquette is located at the end of the southern bay, at:

- 30.6 km (19.0 mi) northeast of the town center of the village of Port-Menier;
- 6.6 km (4.1 mi) south of the north shore of Anticosti Island;
- 16.4 km (10.2 mi) north of the south shore of Anticosti Island.

From its source, the Bec-Scie River flows south between La Petite Rivière (located on the west side); and the Baleine stream and the Sainte-Marie River (located on the east side).

From the mouth of Lac Valiquette, its course descends 13.9 km (8.6 mi) towards the south with a drop of 82 m (269 ft), according to the following segments:

- 3.3 km (2.1 mi) south relatively in a straight line, first passing under the bridge of the main road (east–west direction) of the island and crossing on 0.36 km (0.22 mi) the north-western part of Faure lake (length: 2.3 km (1.4 mi); altitude: 67 m (220 ft)) or the main body of water in this valley, up to its mouth;
- 4.1 km (2.5 mi) towards the southwest to a bend in the river, corresponding to a stream (coming from the north);
- 6.4 km (4.0 mi) south first, winding through an area of marshland, and crossing Lac Sans Bout (length: 0.8 km (0.50 mi); altitude: 37 m (121 ft)), up to its mouth;
- 8.0 km (5.0 mi) towards the south, first passing under the forest road bridge and forming a few serpentines, collecting in the marsh area the discharge (coming from the northwest) of some marshes and lakes including Castor Lake, then passing under the forest road bridge, to its mouth.

The Bec-Scie river flows onto the south shore of Anticosti Island, at the end of a small bay, either 3.1 km (1.9 mi) east of Pointe aux Pimbinas, at 5.6 km (3.5 mi) west of the mouth of the Baleine stream and 24.1 km (15.0 mi) east of the center of the village of Port-Menier. At its mouth, the current of the river forms a channel up to about 1.5 km (0.93 mi) at low tide in the sandstone.

== Toponymy ==
The toponymic designation "Bec-Scie" refers to Mergus, a genus of fish-eating ducks whose French common name is harle. This toponym has been in use since at least 1924.

It was made official on April 2, 1981, at the "Banque des noms de lieux" (Bank of place names) of Commission de toponymie du Québec.

== See also ==
- Minganie Regional County Municipality
- L'Île-d'Anticosti, a municipality
- Anticosti Island, an island
- Gulf of Saint Lawrence
- List of rivers of Quebec
