= La Petite Rivière (Anticosti Island - Western part) =

- Location within Quebec

Location
- Country: Canada
- Province: Quebec
- Region: Côte-Nord
- Regional County Municipality: Minganie Regional County Municipality

Physical characteristics
- Source: Pond in marshland
  - location: L'Île-d'Anticosti
  - coordinates: 49.85851°N 64.06981°W
  - elevation: 93 m (305 ft)
- Mouth: Gulf of Saint Lawrence
  - location: L'Île-d'Anticosti
  - coordinates: 49.73694°N 64.15806°W
  - elevation: 1 m (3.3 ft)
- Length: 20.6 km (12.8 mi)

Basin features
- Tributaries
  - left: (upstream) Three streams, discharge from a lake, discharge from two small lakes (via Lake Simonne).
  - right: (upstream) Discharge from a lake, discharge from a lake, five streams (via Lake Simonne).

La Petite Rivière (French pronunciation: [la pətit ʁivjɛʁ], lit. 'The Little River') is a tributary of the Gulf of St. Lawrence, flowing in the municipality of L'Île-d'Anticosti, in the Minganie Regional County Municipality, in the administrative region of Côte-Nord, in province of Quebec, in Canada.

The main forest road (east–west direction) of Anticosti Island serves the upper part of this valley; it passes between the Lake of the Fourteenth Mile and Lake Simonne. The intermediate part of this valley is served by a forest road (direction es-west). Along the coast, the forest road connects to the east with the forest road network for forestry purposes.

Forestry is the main economic activity in this area; recreational tourism activities, second.

== Geography ==
La Petite Rivière has its source at the Fourteenth Mile Lake (length: 0.6 km (0.37 mi); altitude: 93 m (305 ft)) located in the western part of Anticosti Island. This toponym is based on the fact that it is located at the 14th mile east of the center of the village of Port-Menier. The mouth of this lake surrounded by marshes, is located at the bottom of the southwest bay, at:

- 21.1 km (13.1 mi) northeast of the town center of the village of Port-Menier;
- 8.0 km (5.0 mi) south of the north shore of Anticosti Island;
- 14.9 km (9.3 mi) north of the south shore of Anticosti Island.

From its source, the Petite Rivière flows south between the Trois Milles River (located on the west side); and the Bec-Scie River (located on the east side). From the mouth of the Fourteenth Mile Lake, its course descends 20.6 km (12.8 mi) towards the south with a drop of 92 m (302 ft), according to the following segments:

- 5.8 km (3.6 mi) to the south-west relatively in a straight line, first passing under the bridge of the main road (east–west direction) of the island; then by crossing on 2.7 km (1.7 mi) towards the south the Simonne lake (length: 3.2 km (2.0 mi); altitude: 67 m (220 ft)) or the main plane of water of this valley, up to its mouth. Note: This lake has a peninsula attached to the northeast shore and stretching 0.45 km (0.28 mi) towards the center of the lake; it is called the Navel to Simonne;
- 7.1 km (4.4 mi) towards the south-east, winding in places, collecting the discharge (coming from the north-east) of a small lake and a stream (coming from the east), until the discharge (from the north-west) of a lake and a marsh area;
- 2.9 km (1.8 mi) towards the south first, winding in a marsh area, until the discharge (coming from the north-west) of a small lake and marsh areas;
- 4.8 km (3.0 mi) first south to a bend in the river, then south-west, and finally south, to its mouth.

La Petite Rivière empties onto the south shore of Anticosti Island, at the end of Sarcelles Bay, i.e. 7.7 km (4.8 mi) west of the mouth of Bec-Scie River, at 4.9 km (3.0 mi) east of the mouth of rivière aux Canards and at 16.7 km (10.4 mi) east of the village center of Port-Menier. At its mouth, the current of the river flows over the sandstone to about 0.35 km (0.22 mi) at low tide.

== Toponymy ==
Anticosti Island has two toponyms "La Petite Rivière"; one in the eastern part and the other in the western part.

The name of the river appears on a 1955 Consolidated Bathurst Company map; it is used since 1904 and possibly earlier.

The toponym was made official on December 5, 1968, in the "Bank of place names" of the Commission de toponymie du Québec.

== See also ==
- Minganie Regional County Municipality
- L'Île-d'Anticosti, a Municipality
- Anticosti Island, an island
- Gulf of Saint Lawrence
- List of rivers of Quebec
