= Maccan River (Anticosti Island) =

- Location within Quebec

Location
- Country: Canada
- Province: Quebec
- Region: Côte-Nord
- RCM: Minganie
- Island: Anticosti Island

Physical characteristics
- Source: Mountain stream
  - location: L'Île-d'Anticosti
  - coordinates: 49.31332°N 62.58288°W
  - elevation: 205 m (673 ft)
- Mouth: Gulf of Saint Lawrence
  - location: L'Île-d'Anticosti
  - coordinates: 49.14639°N 62.64778°W
  - elevation: 1 metre (3 ft 3 in)
- Length: 23.3 km (14.5 mi)

The Maccan River is a tributary of the Gulf of Saint Lawrence, flowing in the municipality of L'Île-d'Anticosti, in the Minganie Regional County Municipality, in the administrative region of Côte-Nord, in province of Quebec, in Canada.

This valley is served by a forest road serving the upper part of this small valley especially for the needs of forestry and recreational tourism activities.

== Geography ==
The Maccan River originates from a forest stream (altitude: 205 m (673 ft)), located in the east-central part of the island. This source is located in a forest area at:

- 69.2 km (43.0 mi) west of Heath Point (eastern end of the island);
- 20.2 km (12.6 mi) north of the south shore of Anticosti Island;
- 23.5 km (14.6 mi) south of the north shore of Anticosti Island;
- 139.7 km (86.8 mi) east of the town center of the village of Port-Menier.

From its source, the Maccan river descends between the Petite rivière de la Chaloupe (located on the east side) and the Ferrée River (west side). The Maccan River generally flows south, over 23.3 km (14.5 mi) with a drop of 204 m (669 ft), according to the following segments:

- 17.3 km (10.7 mi) first to the southwest then to the south collecting two streams from the northeast and ten streams from the west, up to a stream (coming from the northeast);
- 6.0 km (3.7 mi) to the south curving to the southeast and crossing areas of marsh in the flat of the southern coast of the island forming a hook of 0.4 km (0.25 mi) towards the south-west at the end of the segment, up to its mouth.

The Maccan River flows into a marsh area on the south shore of Anticosti Island, in the Gulf of Saint Lawrence, on the west side of Pointe Bilodeau. This confluence is located 3.0 km (1.9 mi) west of the mouth of the Bilodeau River, at 4.8 km (3.0 mi) east of the mouth of the Ferrée River and at 144.4 km (89.7 mi) east of the center of the village of Port-Menier.

== Toponymy ==
This toponymic designation was indicated in 1924 in the Bulletin de la Société de géographie de Québec, as well as in the 1904 work by Joseph Schmitt, entitled "Monographie de l'île Anticosti".

The toponym “rivière Maccan” was made official on December 5, 1968, at the place name bank of the Commission de toponymie du Québec.

== See also ==
- Honguedo Strait
- List of rivers of Quebec
