= Rivière à la Loutre (Anticosti Island) =

Location
- Country: Canada
- Province: Quebec
- Region: Côte-Nord
- Regional County Municipality: Minganie Regional County Municipality

Physical characteristics
- Source: Lake Long
  - location: L'Île-d'Anticosti
  - coordinates: 49.71063°N 63.63999°W
  - elevation: 117 m (384 ft)
- Mouth: Gulf of Saint Lawrence
  - location: L'Île-d'Anticosti
  - coordinates: 49°36′55″N 63°47′38″W
  - elevation: 1 m (3.3 ft)
- Length: 29.6 km (18.4 mi)

Basin features
- Tributaries
  - left: (upstream) stream (coming from the northeast), discharge of Lake Rabougri, discharge of a set of small lakes, discharge of a small lake, discharge of a set of lakes, seven streams.
  - right: (upstream) five streams, discharge from Lac Caché, discharge from three lakes including Lac Chevalier, stream (coming from the north), stream (coming from the northeast), stream (via the lake?), discharge from Lac Menier.

The rivière à la Loutre is a water course flowing into Gulf of Saint Lawrence, flowing in the municipality of L'Île-d'Anticosti, in the regional county municipality (MRC) of Minganie Regional County Municipality, in the administrative region of Côte-Nord, in province of Quebec, in Canada.

Forest roads serve the valley of this river. Forestry is the main economic activity in this area; recreational tourism activities, second.

== Geography ==
The Rivière à la Loutre draws its source from Lac long (length: 34 km (21 mi); altitude: 3.5 m (11 ft)) located in the center-west of Anticosti Island. This source is located at:

- 31.8 km (19.8 mi) east of the town center of the village of Port-Menier;
- 14.9 km (9.3 mi) south of the north shore of Anticosti Island;
- 17.1 km (10.6 mi) northeast of the south shore of Anticosti Island.

From the mouth of Long Lake, the Rivière à la Loutre flows over 29.6 km (18.4 mi) with a drop of , according to the following segments:

- 9.6 km (6.0 mi) first to the north, forming a large 180 degree curve with a diameter of approximately 4.0 km (2.5 mi), up to the western limit of SÉPAQ Anticosti;
- 13.6 km (8.5 mi) towards the south, constituting the western limit of the SÉPAQ Anticosti by forming a hook towards the west at the end of the segment, up to a bend in the river;
- 6.4 km (4.0 mi) to the south in the SÉPAQ Anticosti, to its mouth.

Rivière à la Loutre flows onto the south shore of Anticosti Island, i.e. 6.1 km (3.8 mi) from the western limit of SÉPAQ Anticosti and 39.2 km (24.4 mi) east of the village center of Port-Menier.

== Toponymy ==
The toponym "rivière à la Loutre" was made official on December 5, 1968, at the Place Names Bank of the Commission de toponymie du Québec.

== See also ==
- List of rivers of Quebec
