= L'Île-d'Anticosti, Quebec =

L'Île-d'Anticosti
- Municipality
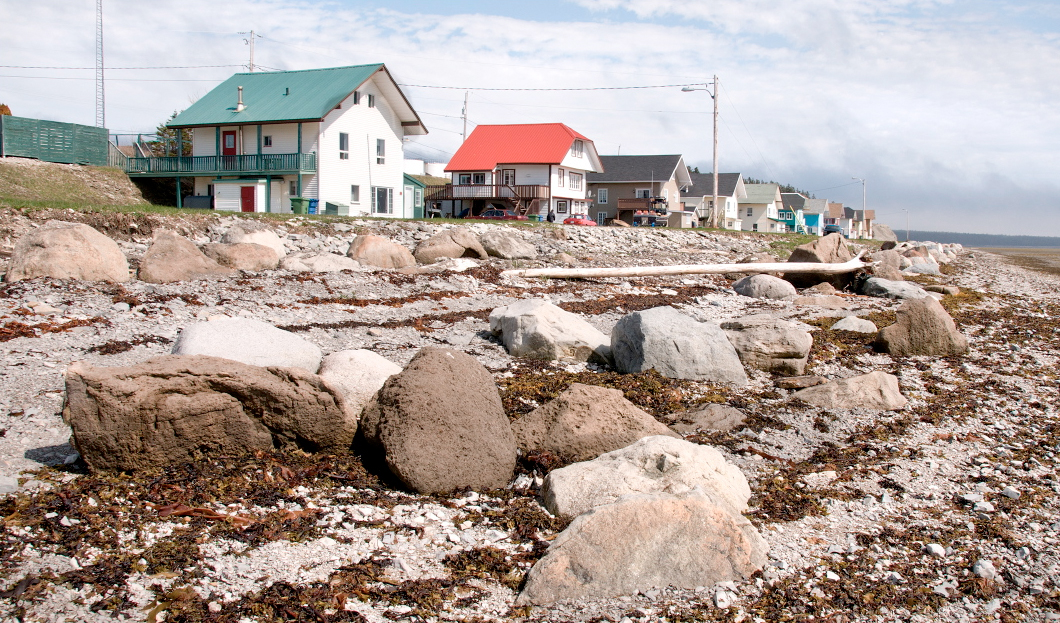

- Location in Côte-Nord region of Quebec
- Coordinates: 49°30′N 63°00′W
- Country: Canada
- Province: Quebec
- Region: Côte-Nord
- RCM: Minganie
- Constituted: January 1, 1984

Government
  - Mayor: Hélène Boulanger
  - Federal riding: Côte-Nord—Kawawachikamach—Nitassinan
  - Prov. riding: Duplessis

Area
  - Total: 9,291.18 km^{2} (3,587.34 sq mi)
  - Land: 7,715.99 km^{2} (2,979.16 sq mi)

Population (2021)
  - Total: 177
  - Density: 0/km^{2} (0/sq mi)
  - Pop (2016-21): ▼18.8%
  - Dwellings: 134
- Time zone: UTC−5 (EST)
  - Summer (DST): UTC−4 (EDT)
- Postal code(s): G0G 2Y0
- Area codes: 418 and 581
- Highways: No major routes
- Website: municipalite-anticosti.org

L'Île-d'Anticosti (French pronunciation: [lil dɑ̃tikɔsti]) is a municipality located on Anticosti Island, between the straits of Jacques Cartier and Honguedo, in the Gulf of St. Lawrence, in Minganie Regional County Municipality, Côte-Nord region, Quebec, Canada.

== Toponymy ==
Within the municipality, the main populated area is Port-Menier.

Officially the municipality was formed first in 1902 when Anticosti Island was separated from the County of Saguenay. But since the entire island was privately owned, there was no elected council to preside over the islanders, who were either servants of the landlord or employees of logging companies. Even after the island was owned again by the provincial government in 1974, it took another decade to put a working municipal organization in place. On January 31, 1984, the first council was finally sworn in.

== UNESCO's World Heritage ==
On September 19, 2023, Anticosti was inscribed on UNESCO. It is recognized for its exceptional fossil assemblage representing the first global mass extinction of animal life on Earth.

Located within protected areas free from any industrial activity, the site contains well-preserved, abundant and diverse fossil fauna. This Anticosti fauna represents the first mass extinction of animal life on a global scale, 447–437 million years ago, at the end of the Ordovician period.

Vauréal Canyon

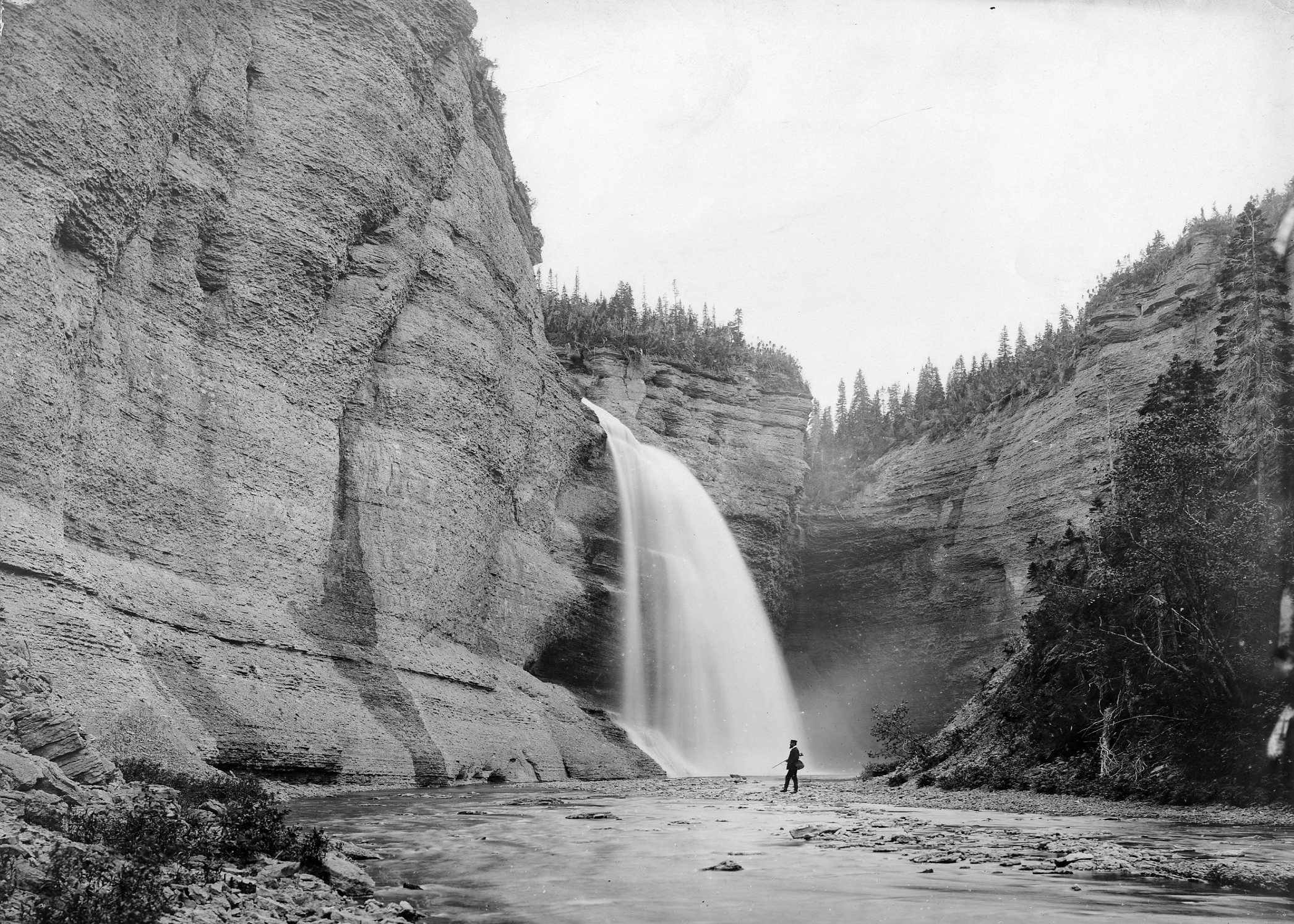
Cliff wall, fall and Vauréal River

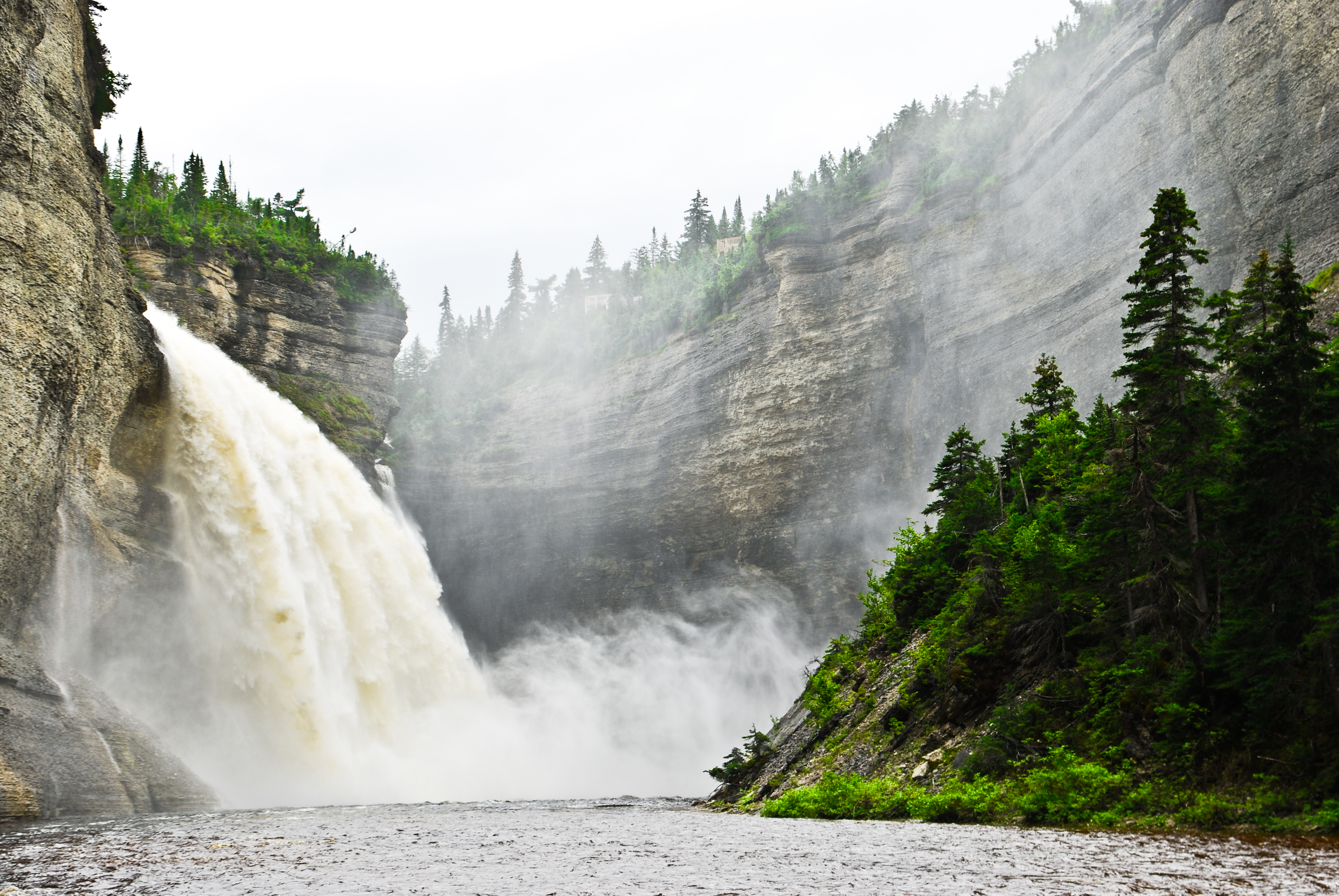
Cliff wall, fall and Vauréal River

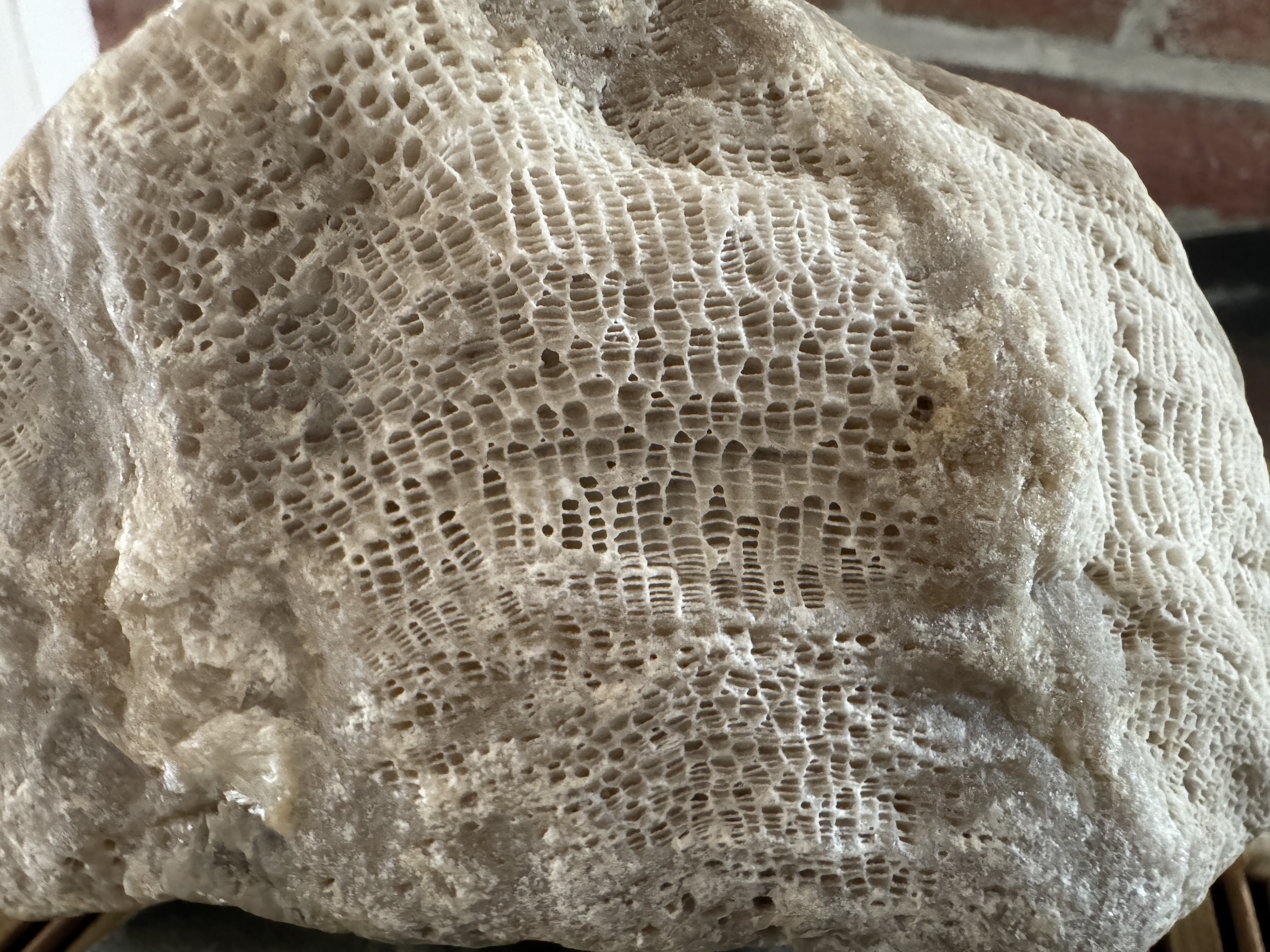
Fossil (probably sponge), in the gravel, at the foot of the wall

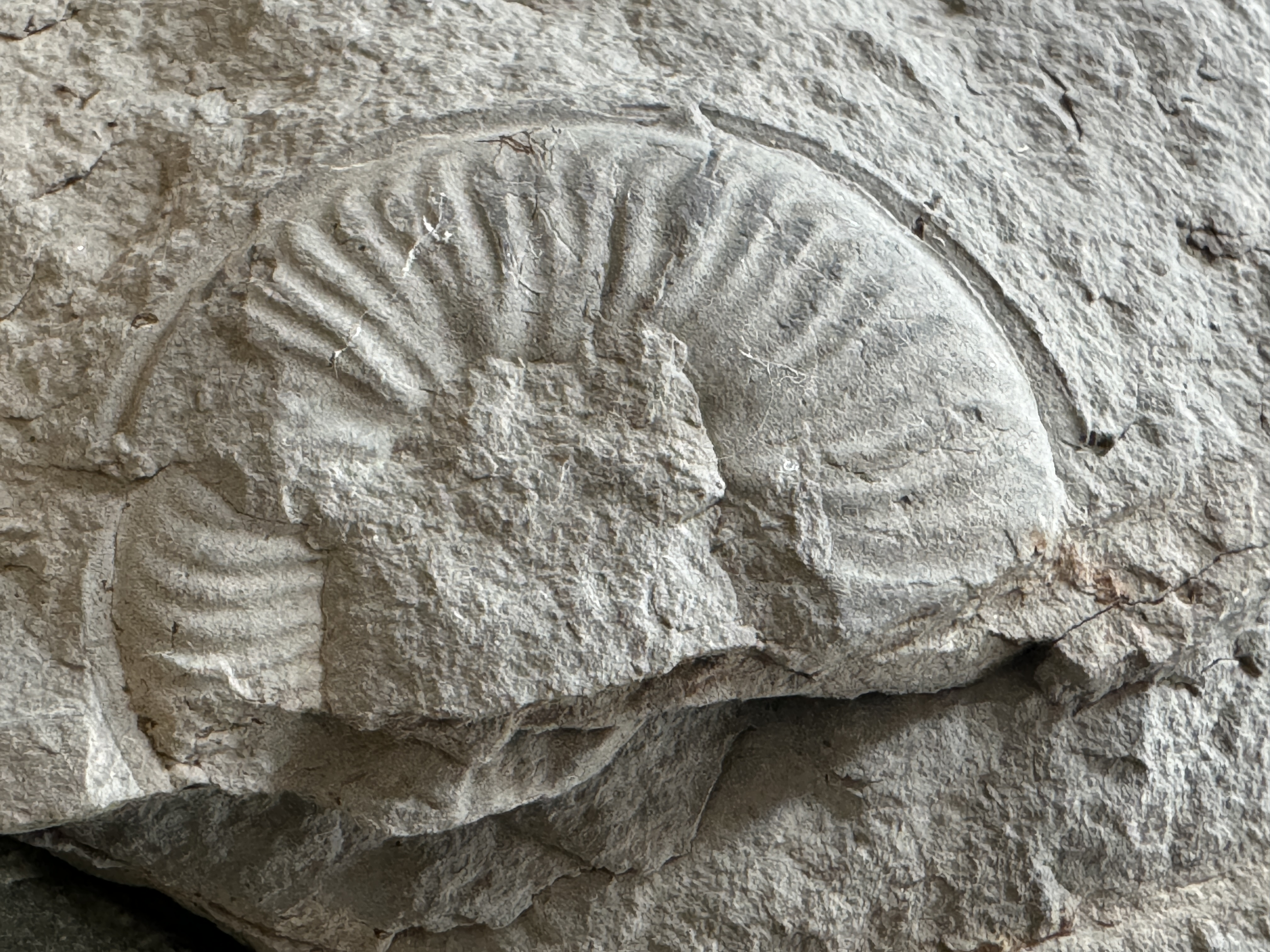
Fossil to be identified, in the gravel, at the foot of the wall

The Vauréal River has its source in Lake Vauréal, it flows 25 km south-northeast, in the eastern part of the island. The salmon goes up the river to the Vauréal Falls, 13 km from the coast, crossing the Vauréal canyon where the river is enclosed between two limestone walls.

== Communities ==
=== Port-Menier ===
The village of Port-Menier is the hub of the island. Its population doubles in the summer with seasonal workers and tourists. The economic mainstays are outdoor tourism and forestry/logging. Services available in Port-Menier include general and grocery stores, gas station, banking, restaurant, and lodging.

== Demographics ==
=== Population ===
Canada census – L'Île-d'Anticosti community profile

	2021	2016	2011
Population	177 (-18.8% from 2016)	218 (-9.2% from 2011)	240 (-14.6% from 2006)
Land area	7,715.99 km^{2} (2,979.16 sq mi)	7,953.20 km^{2} (3,070.75 sq mi)	7,892.15 km^{2} (3,047.18 sq mi)
Population density	0/km^{2} (0/sq mi)	0.0/km^{2} (0/sq mi)	0.0/km^{2} (0/sq mi)
Median age	56.4 (M: 55.2, F: 56.8)	53.0 (M: 55.6, F: 54.2)	47.6 (M: 51.0, F: 46.3)
Private dwellings	134 (total) 97 (occupied)	186 (total)	161 (total)
Median household income	$N/A	$56,704	$N/A

Notes: 2021 and 2011 income data for this area has been suppressed for data quality or confidentiality reasons.
References: 2021 2016 2011

Historical census data - L'Île-d'Anticosti, Quebec

Year	Pop.	±%
1921	451	—
1931	454	+0.7%
1941	424	−6.6%
1951	743	+75.2%
1956	856	+15.2%
1961	532	−37.9%

Year	Pop.	±%
1966	494	−7.1%
1971	419	−15.2%
1976	293	−30.1%
1981	275	−6.1%
1986	335	+21.8%
1991	264	−21.2%

Year	Pop.	±%
1996	263	−0.4%
2001	266	+1.1%
2006	281	+5.6%
2011	240	−14.6%
2016	218	−9.2%
2021	177	−18.8%

Source: Statistics Canada

=== Language ===
Canada Census mother tongue - L'Île-d'Anticosti, Quebec
Census	Total	French			English			French & English			Other		
Year	Responses	Count	Trend	Pop %	Count	Trend	Pop %	Count	Trend	Pop %	Count	Trend	Pop %
2021	180	170	▼19.0%	94.4%	5	0.0%	2.8%	0	0.0%	0.0%	0	0.0%	0.0%
2016	215	210	▼10.6%	97.7%	5	0.0%	2.3%	0	0.0%	0.0%	0	0.0%	0.0%
2011	240	235	▼16.1%	97.9%	5	▲ n/a%	2.1%	0	0.0%	0.0%	0	0.0%	0.0%
2006	280	280	▲7.1%	100.0%	0	▼100.0%	0.0%	0	0.0%	0.0%	0	▼100.0%	0.0%
2001	280	260	▼1.9%	92.9%	10	▲ n/a%	3.6%	0	0.0%	0.0%	10	▲ n/a%	3.6%
1996	265	265	n/a	100.0%	0	n/a	0.0%	0	n/a	0.0%	0	n/a	0.0%

== Local government ==
List of former mayors:

- No mayor 1902–1984 (no municipal organization)
- Raymond Bond (1984–1986)
- Mario Auclair (1986–1988, 1993–2002)
- Jean-Guy Joubert (1988–1989)
- Fernand Tremblay (1989–1990)
- No mayor 1990–1993 (under government supervision)
- Denis Malouin (2002–2005)
- Denis Duteau (2005–2013)
- Jean-François Boudreault (2013–2015)
- John Pineault (2016–2021)
- Hélène Boulanger (2021–present)

== Time zone ==
Anticosti Island is bisected by the 63rd meridian west, and as a result, the eastern part of the municipality is officially within the AST legislated time zone boundary. However, in practice, all of L'Île-d'Anticosti observes the Eastern Time Zone (EST and EDT).

== Education ==
Commission scolaire du Littoral operates St-Joseph School (francophone) in Port-Menier.

== See also ==
- List of municipalities in Quebec
