= Dendermonde =

Municipality in Flemish Community, Belgium

Dendermonde: Termonde (French)
- Municipality
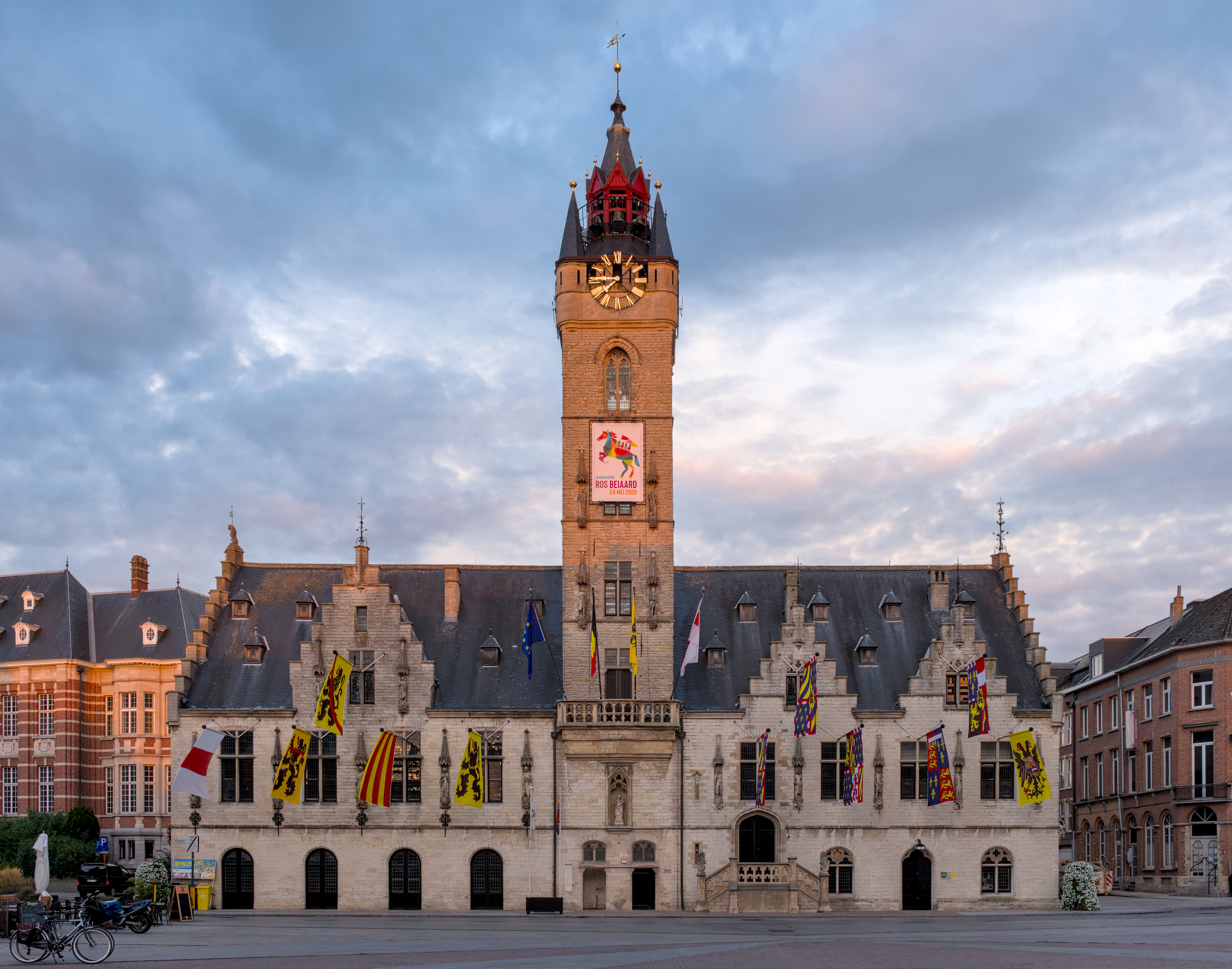
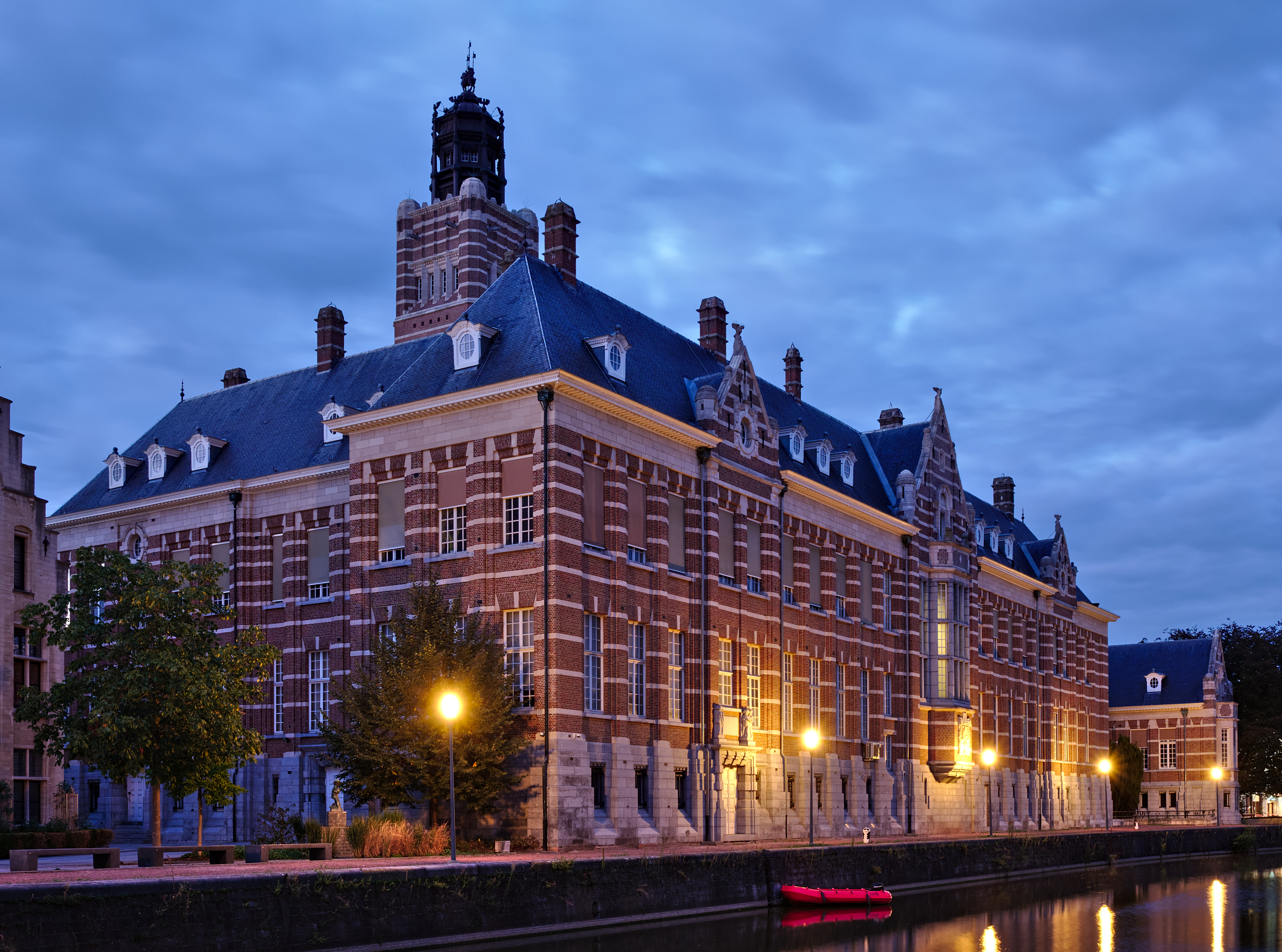
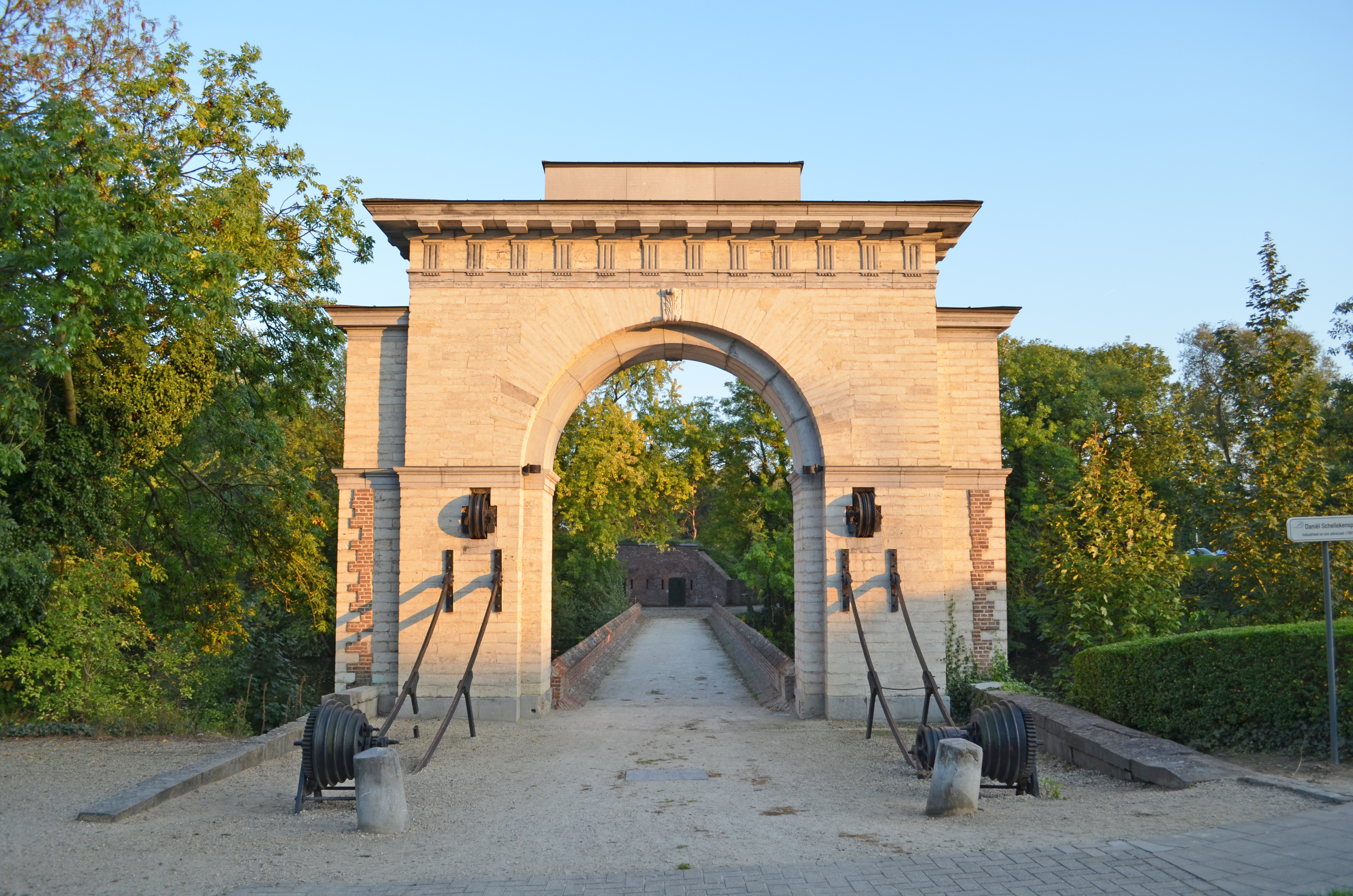
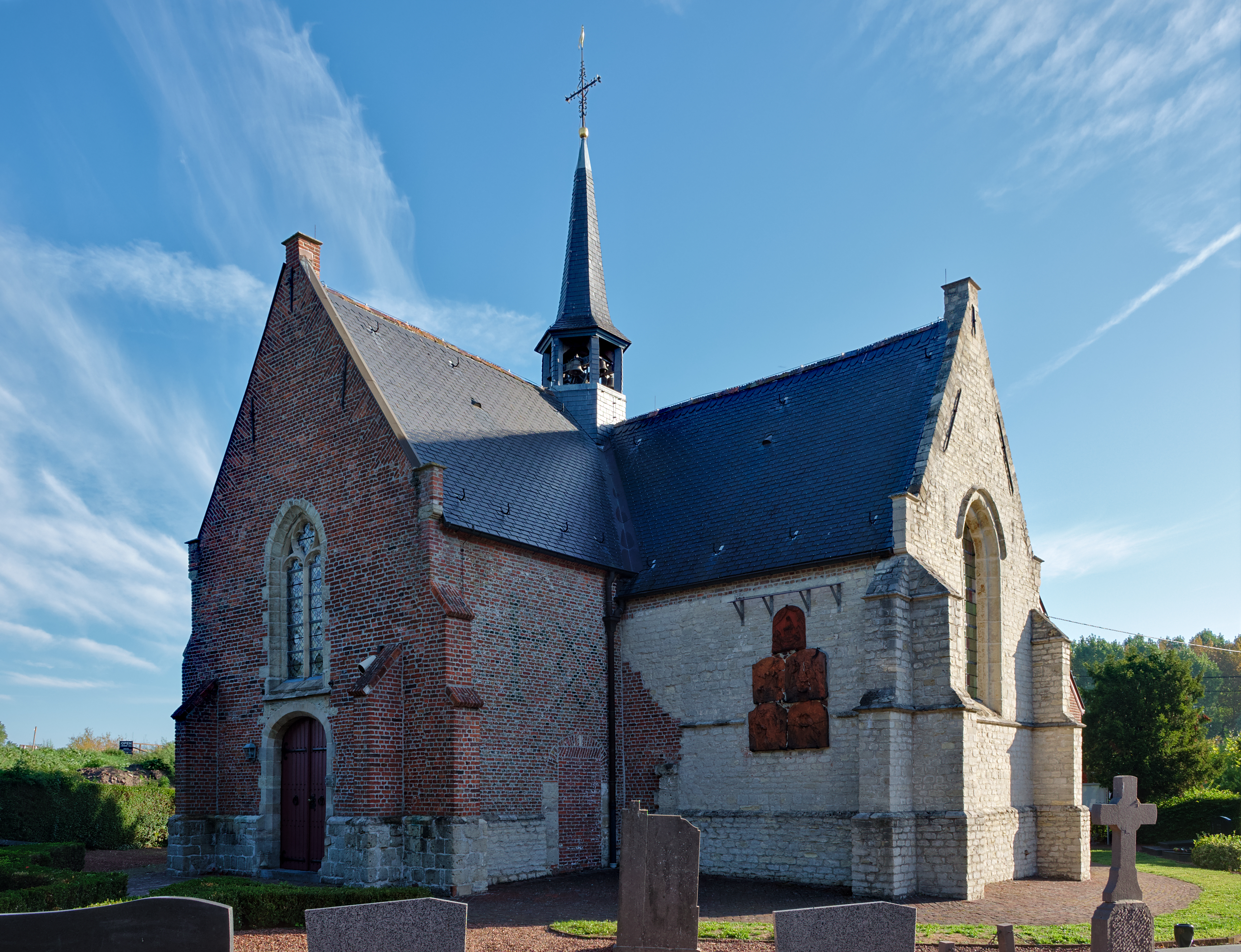
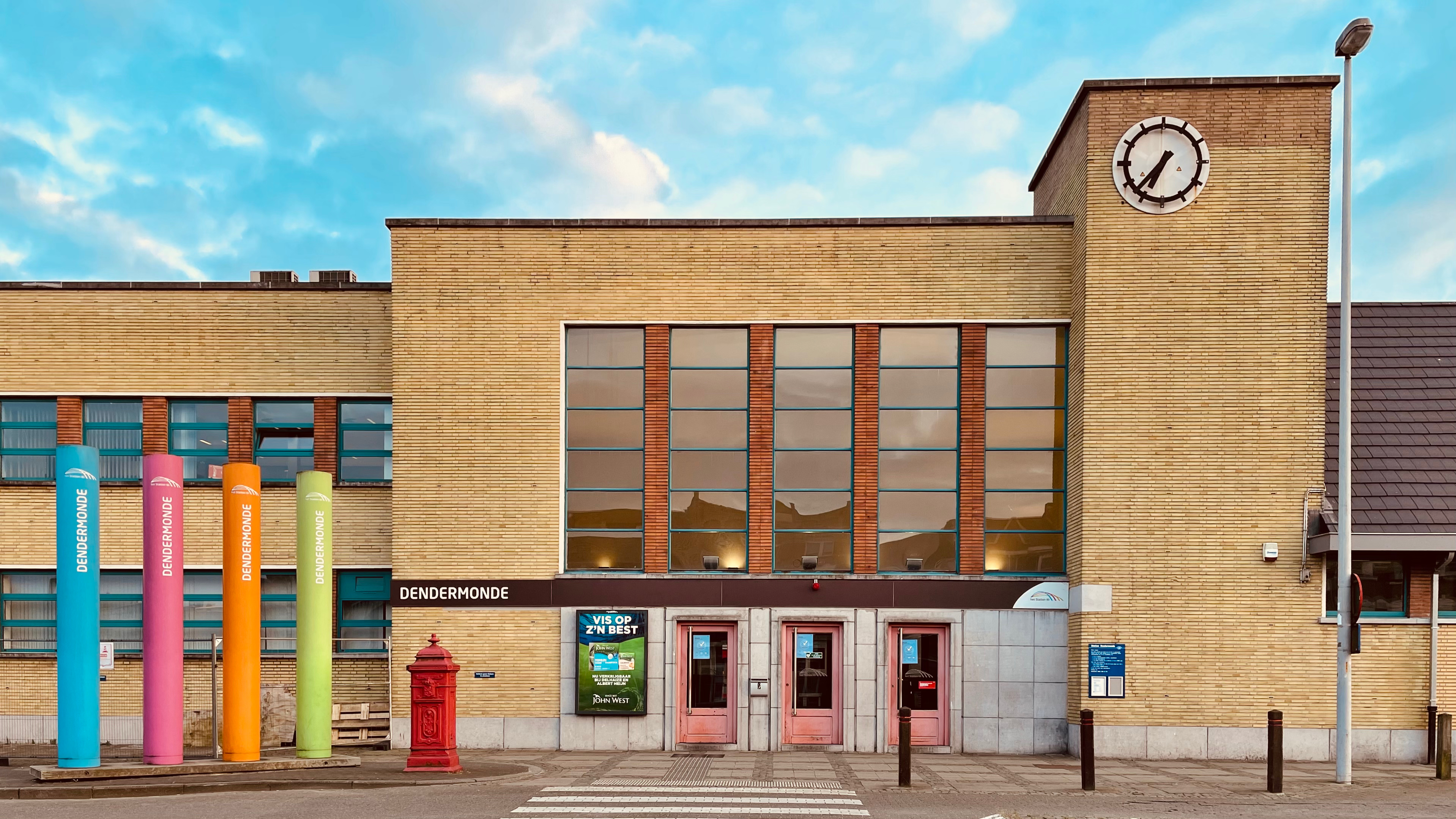
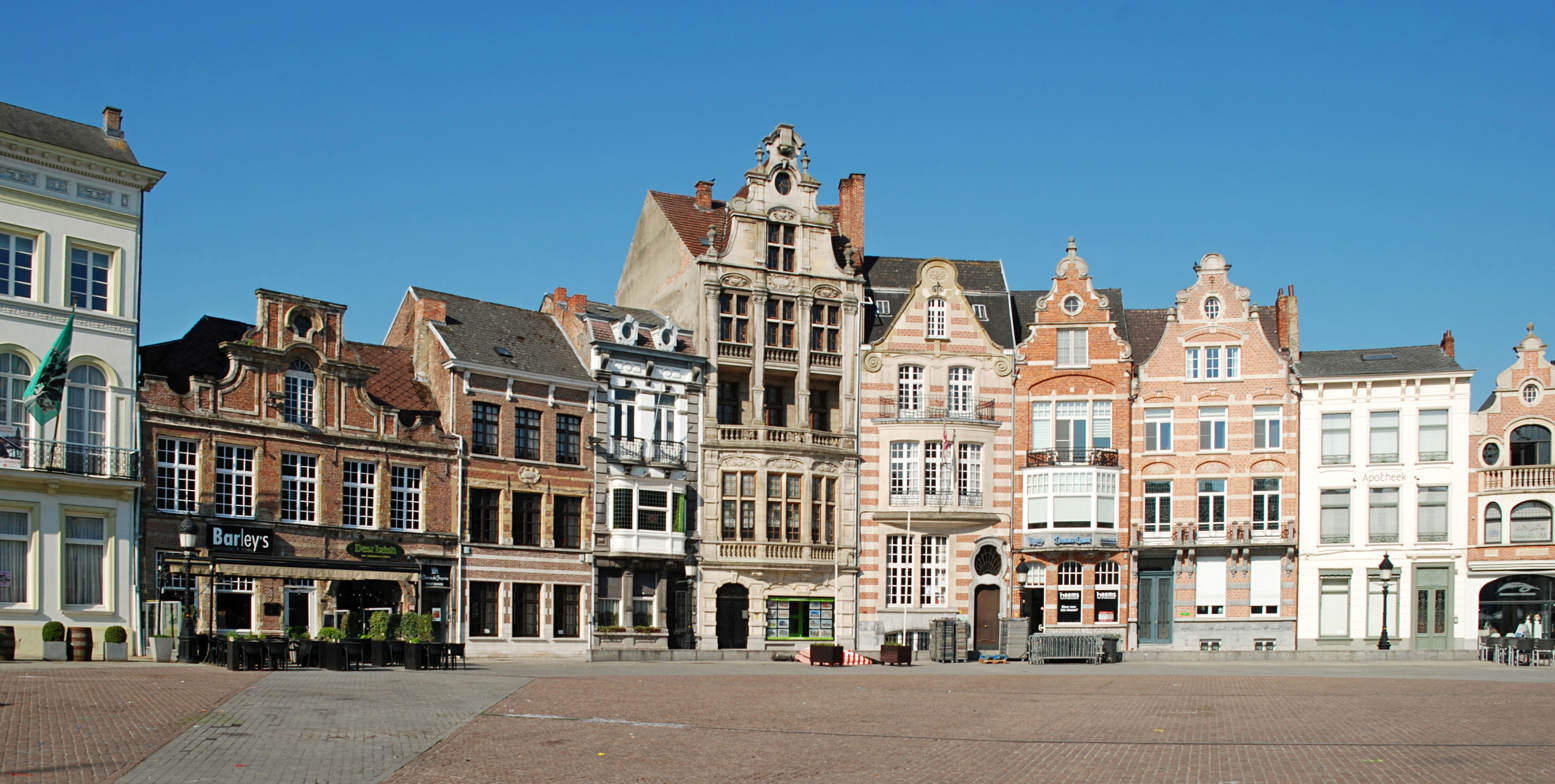
- Town hall Court building Brussels Gate Church of Saint Gertrude Station building Marketplace

- Flag Coat of arms

- Location of Dendermonde in East Flanders
- Interactive map of Dendermonde
- Location in Belgium
- Coordinates: 51°02′N 04°06′E
- Country: Belgium
- Community: Flemish Community
- Region: Flemish Region
- Province: East Flanders
- Arrondissement: Dendermonde

Government
  - Mayor: Leen Dierick (CD&V)
  - Governing parties: CD&V, Vooruit, Vernieuwing

Area
  - Total: 56.52 km^{2} (21.82 sq mi)

Population (2018-01-01)
  - Total: 45,673
  - Density: 808.1/km^{2} (2,093/sq mi)
- Postal codes: 9200
- NIS code: 42006
- Area codes: 052
- Website: www.dendermonde.be

Dendermonde (Dutch pronunciation: [ˌdɛndərˈmɔndə]; French: Termonde, French pronunciation: [tɛʁmɔ̃d]) is a city in the Flemish province of East Flanders in Belgium. The municipality comprises the city of Dendermonde and the towns of Appels, Baasrode, Grembergen, Mespelare, Oudegem, Schoonaarde, and Sint-Gillis-bij-Dendermonde. Dendermonde is located at the mouth of the river Dender, where it flows into the Scheldt. The town has a long-standing folkloric feud with Aalst, south along the same river, which dates back to the Middle Ages.

The city is an administrative, commercial, educational, and medical centre for the surrounding region. The current mayor of Dendermonde is Leen Dierick (Christian Democratic and Flemish).

== History ==
=== Origins to the 15th century ===
The region of the Scheldt was inhabited in prehistory, as proven by some La Tène artifacts found in Appels. Grave sites from the 2nd and 6th century also attest to dense settlement in Gallo-Roman and Merovingian times. In 843, the Treaty of Verdun placed Dendermonde in Lotharingia. After the Norman invasions of 883, however, Baldwin II took over the region and incorporated it into the German part of the newly founded County of Flanders.

Otto II built a fort here in the 10th century, encouraging further settlements in the area. The town received its city charter in 1233 and grew quickly after that, thanks to a thriving cloth industry. Several cloisters, chapels and churches, and a fortified defensive wall were built as well. A cloth hall and belfry were erected on the market square in the mid 14th century. The town's prosperity, however, gave rise to severe competition with cities such as Ghent and to occasional attacks and plunders by neighbours. In 1384, the whole area came under the control of the Valois dukes of Burgundy.

=== 16th–20th centuries ===
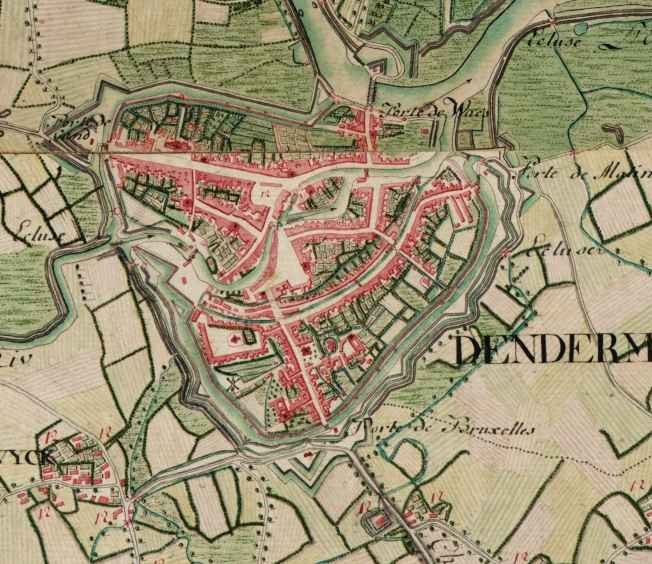
Dendermonde on the Ferraris map (around 1775)

The 16th century saw a decline in Dendermonde's fortunes. In 1572, the city was conquered by William the Silent. The same year, however, Spanish troops under Duke Alexander Farnese of Parma, took over the city, looted and mostly destroyed it. A decade later, the Spaniards built their own fortress between the Dender and the Scheldt. In 1667, it was France's turn, under Louis XIV, to advance on the city, but they were turned back when the defenders opened the dikes and flooded the countryside. The allied troops of the Netherlands and England, under the Duke of Marlborough, caused the heaviest damage in 1706. The city was then fortified by the Austrians against further French ambitions. After a last siege by Louis XV, the city could finally breathe to the point that the fortifications were dismantled a few decades later.

The second half of the 18th century was generally prosperous, with the advent of the Industrial Revolution and a local cotton industry. After 1800, the port facilities were modernized and the first railways laid down, allowing other industries (e.g. oil, shoe, leather, etc.) to move in.

The onset of World War I in September 1914 was disastrous for the city as more than half of its housing and the city archives were either bombed or burned down.

=== 21st century ===
On 19 August 2006, 28 prisoners managed to escape Dendermonde prison. Seven of them were captured within hours. A few were later found in Italy and Russia. They managed to escape because the lock was old and rusty. They simply walked away, tied all their sheets together, climbed over the wall, jumped on a phone booth and ran away.

On 23 January 2009, a 20-year-old Flemish man named Kim De Gelder attacked a children's daycare centre in the village of Sint-Gillis-bij-Dendermonde, stabbing three people to death and wounding as many as twenty. One of the school teachers and two babies, aged 8 and 9 months, died in the attack.

== Main sights ==
- The central market square (Grote Markt)
- The Town Hall, housing an art collection
- The Butcher's Hall (Dutch: Vleeshuismuseum), a museum with an archeological and historical collection. From the prehistory of the region to the 21st century
- The Church of Our Lady (Dutch: Onze Lieve-Vrouwekerk) with two paintings by Anthony van Dyck
- The béguinage is a UNESCO World Heritage Site since 1998.
- The city hall and belfry have also been designated a World Heritage Site since 1999. The belfry houses a carillon and was formerly part of the Cloth Hall.
- The Dendermonde Abbey, a Benedictine abbey famous for its library containing an original manuscript of Hildegard of Bingen, called the 'Dendermonde Codex'.
- The Dendermonde-Puurs Steam Railway is a heritage railway, running 14 kilometres (8.7 mi) from Dendermonde to Puurs.
- Jazz Center Flanders, archive, documentation center and museum
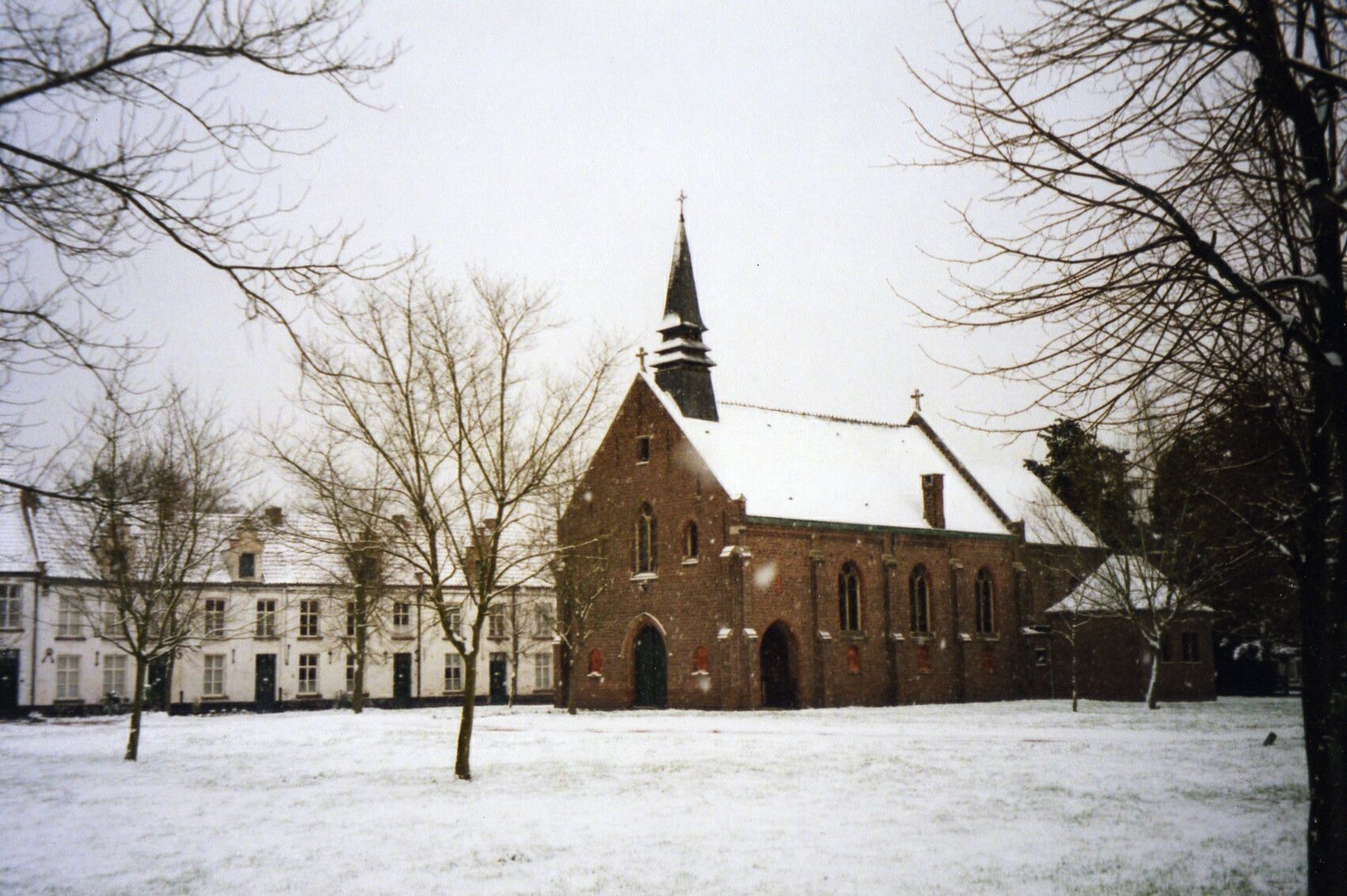
Dendermonde beguinage

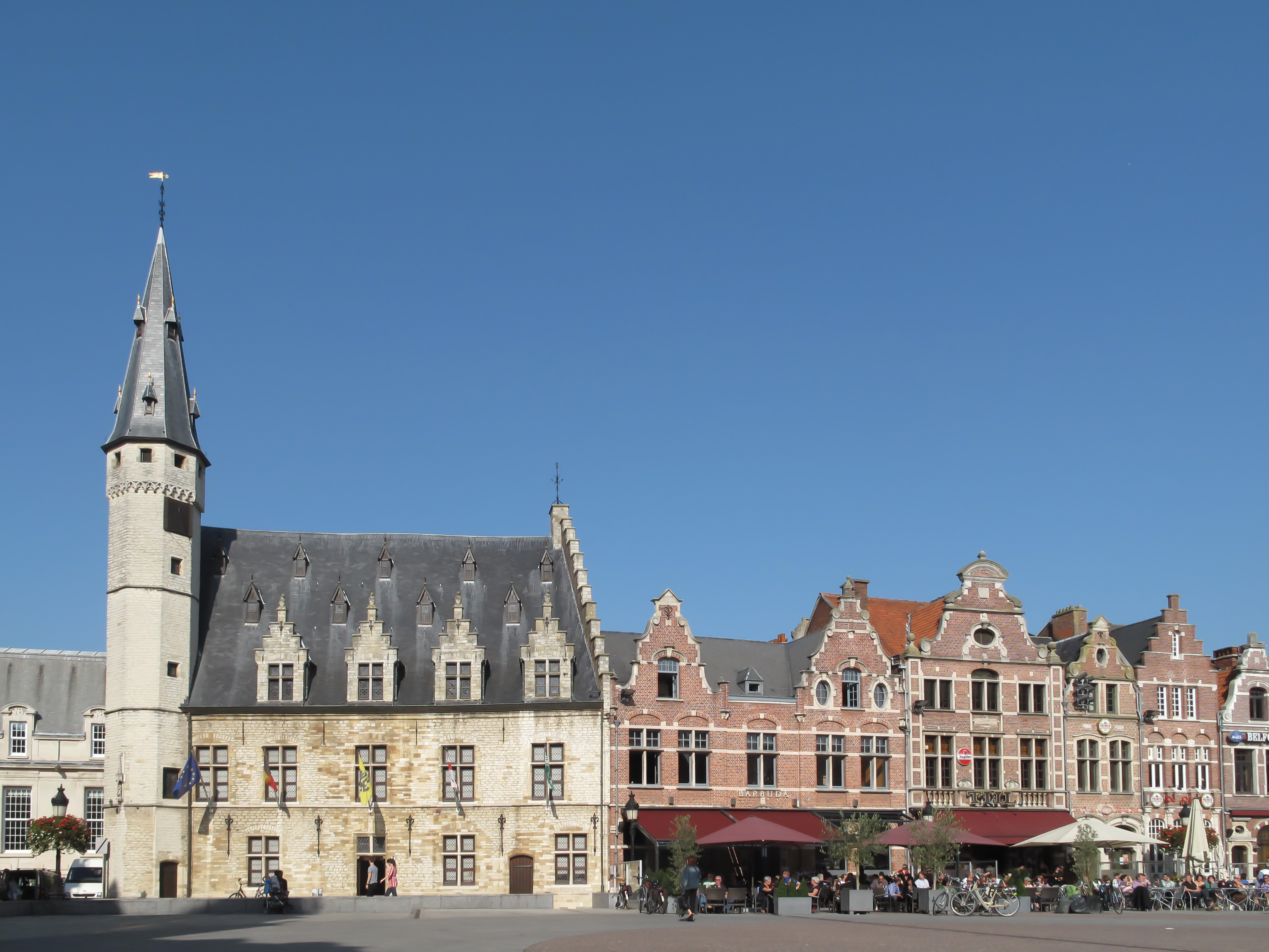
Monumental building: het Vleeshuis

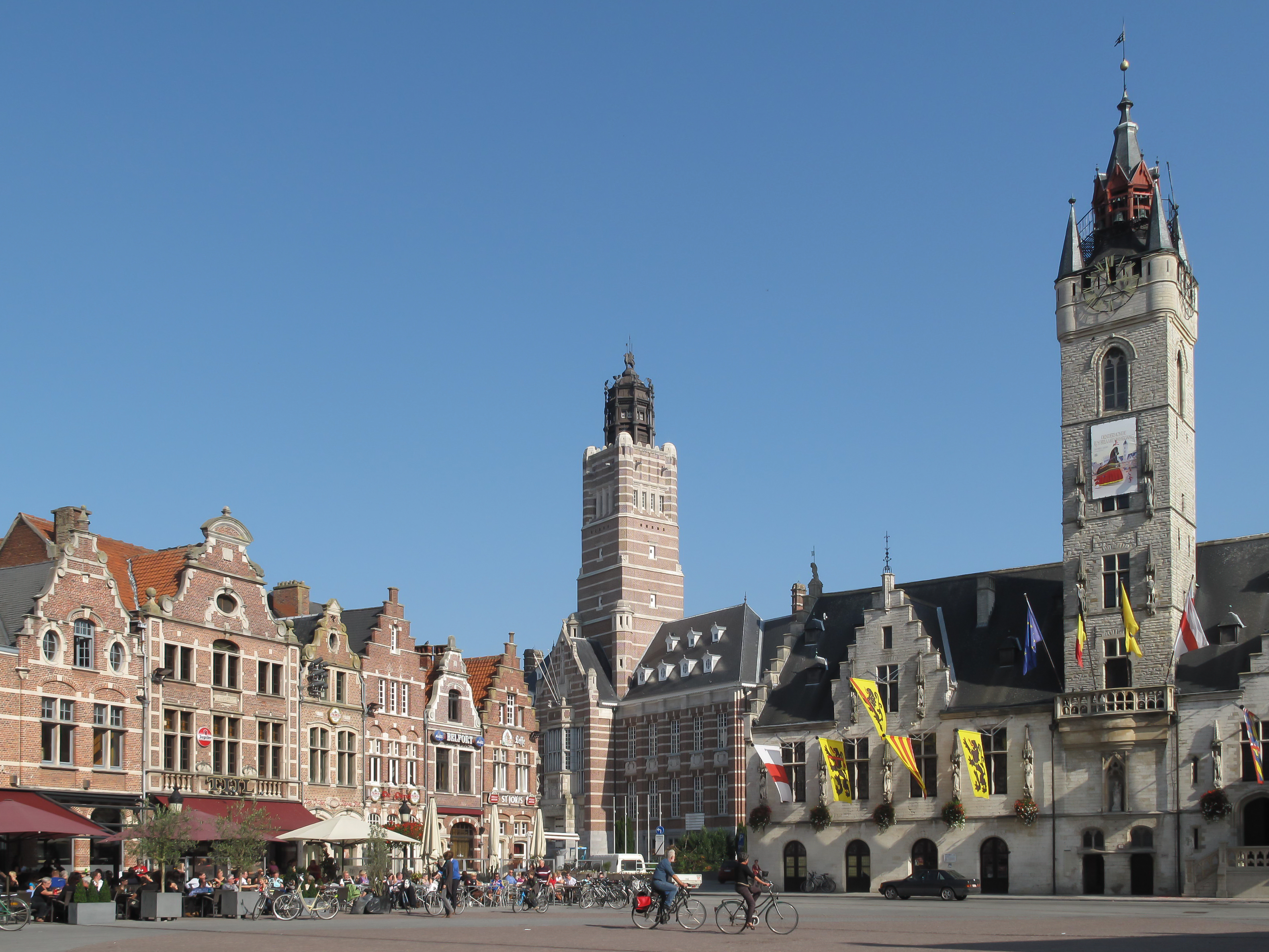
Market square with pubs and town hall

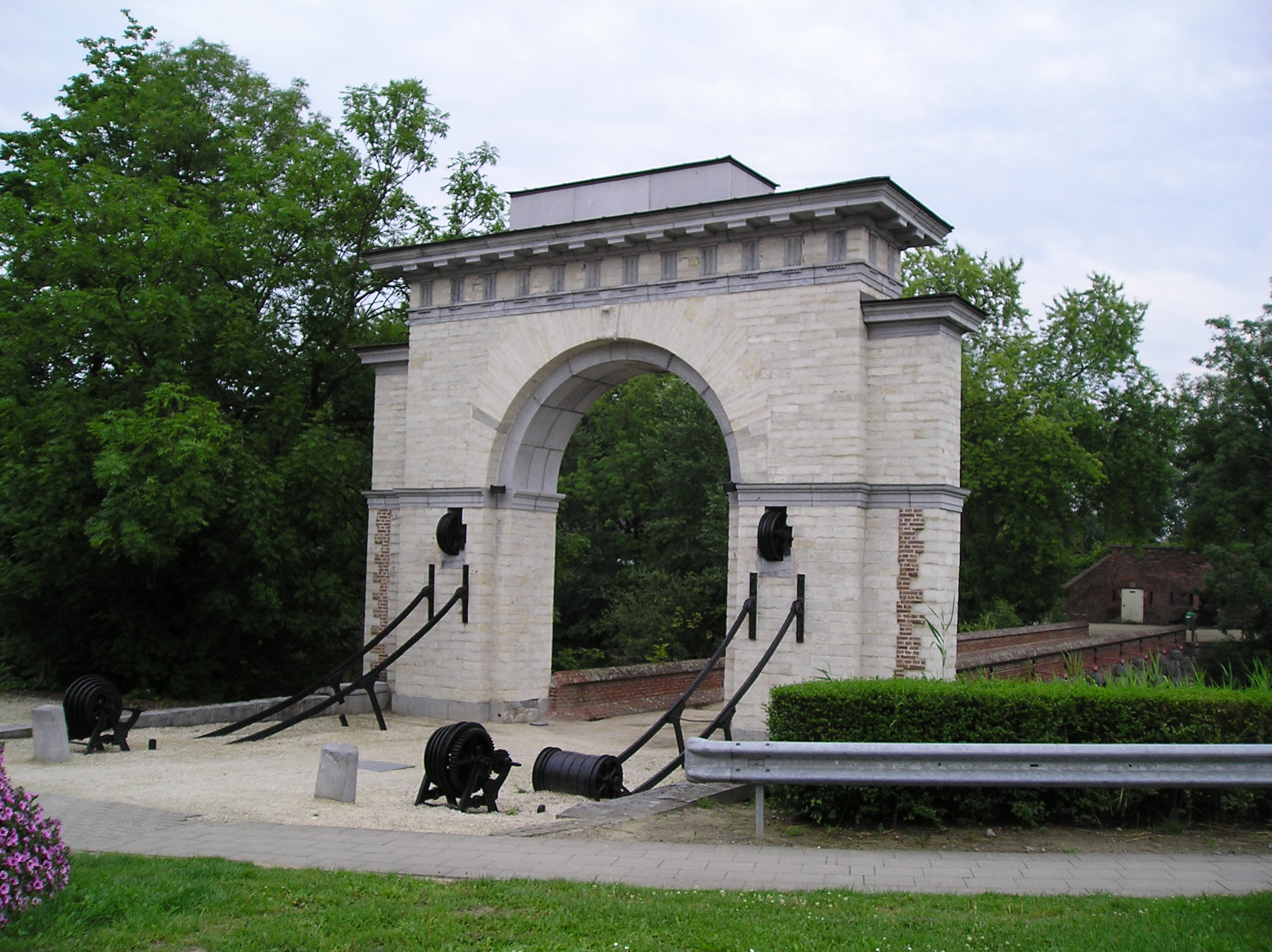
Brussels Gate

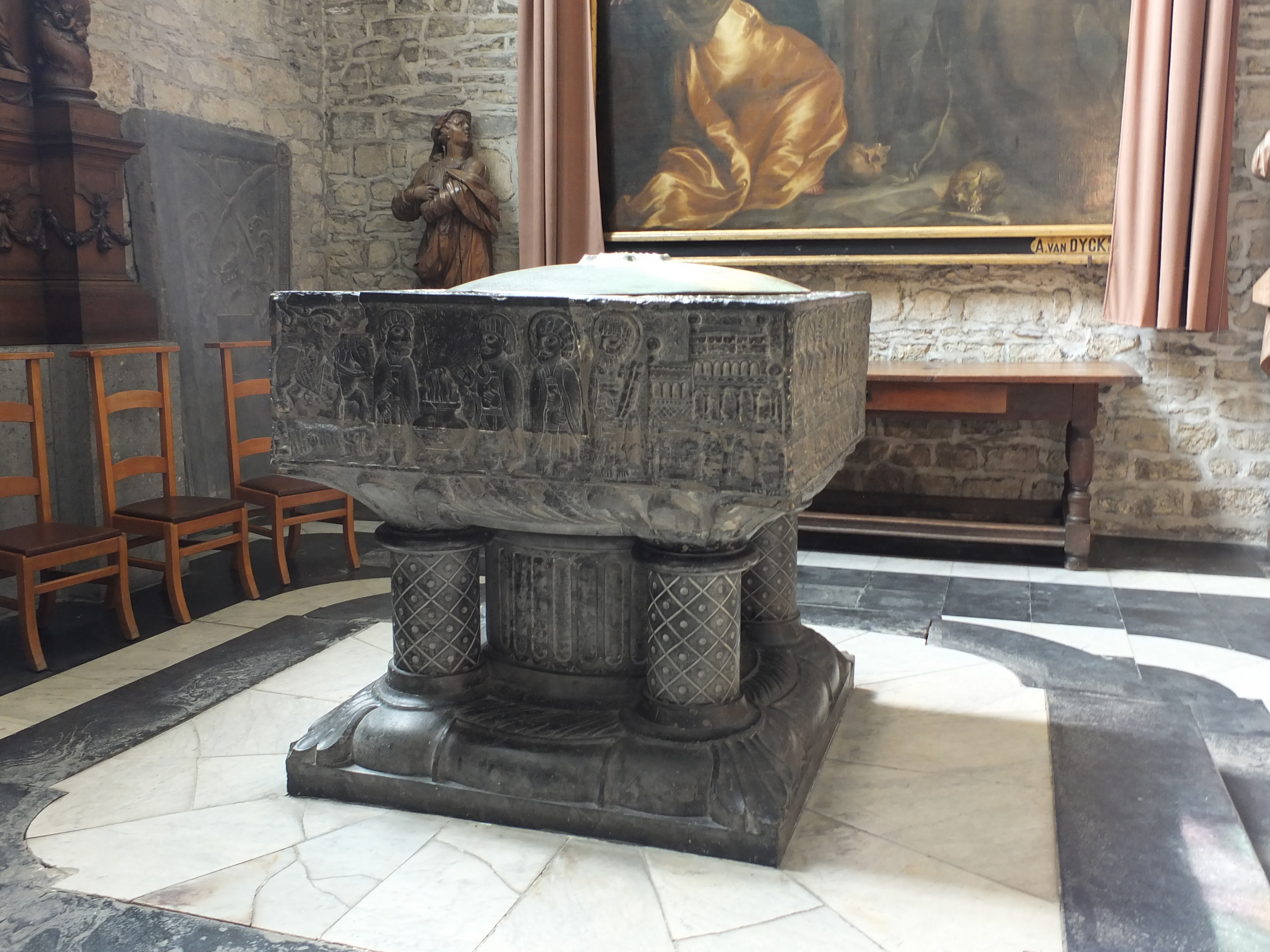
Tournai font in the Onze Lieve-Vrouwekerk

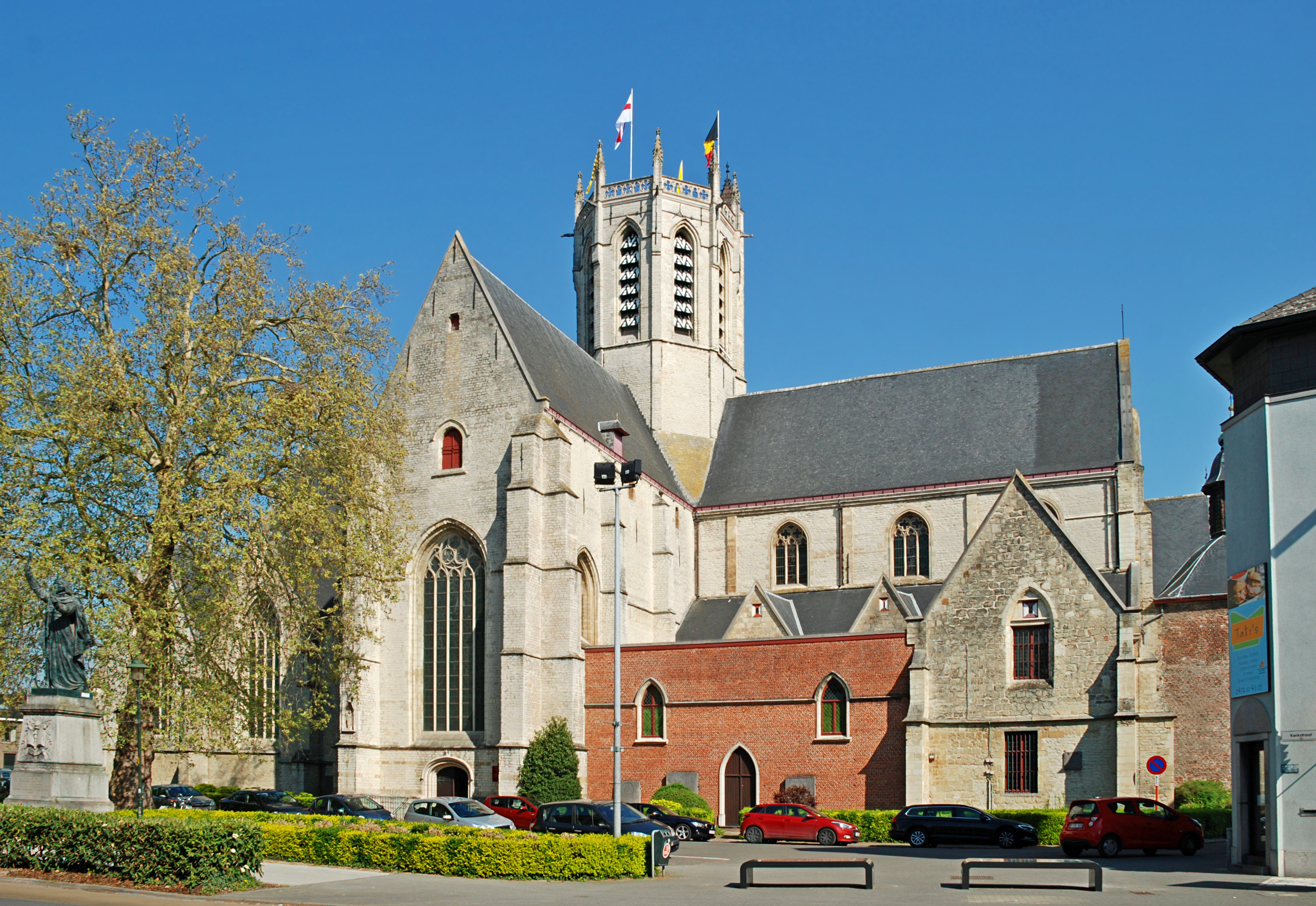
The Church of Our Lady (Onze Lieve-Vrouwekerk)

== Events ==
Dendermonde likes to be known for its decennial procession, featuring the heroic horse: Ros Beiaard. Legend has this horse saving his master and his three brothers from capture by Charlemagne. The annual Parade of the three Giants of the Guilds Indian, Mars and Goliath, have the title of Masterpieces of the Oral and Intangible Heritage of Humanity by UNESCO. This parade takes place on the last Thursday of August.

On 10 August 2026, De Brand construction workers unearthed €9m in gold (coins, nuggets and numbered bullion bars), in a bag in a bricked-in cellar wall beneath the villa built for the original brewery owner, Theophilus Van Assche, in the late 1800s, at a former brewery on Van Langenhovestraat in Sint-Gillis-bij-Dendermonde, now owned by CAW Oost-Vlaanderen Police took the gold to a safe location. The East Flanders prosecutor's office spokesman Hanne Ollevier said: "At the moment, it is not known what that gold comes from and also legally not to whom that gold belongs (Op dit moment is niet geweten waarvan dat goud afkomstig is en ook juridisch niet aan wie dat goud toebehoort)" Theophile Van Assche's 3 children of never married. In 1982, after the last member of the family died, the building was donated to Dendermonde Abbey.

== Sport ==
Dendermonde is home to Rugby Union club Dendermondse RC, champions of the Belgian Elite League in 2012, 2016, 2017, 2018, 2023, 2024 and 2025.

== Notable people ==
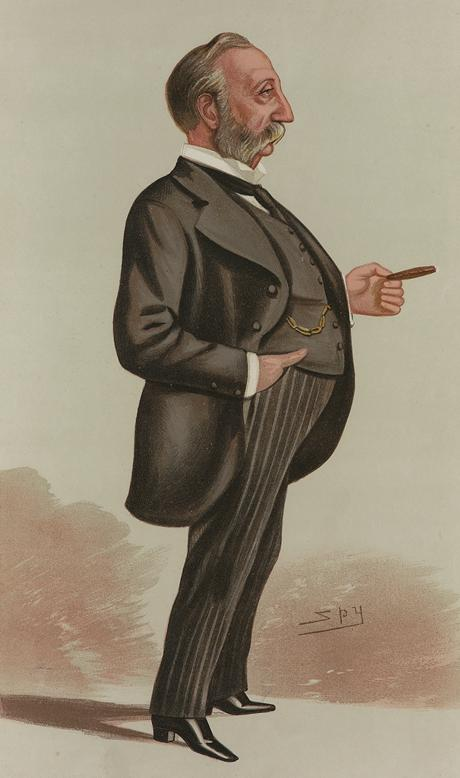
Polydore de Keyser, Vanity Fair, 1887

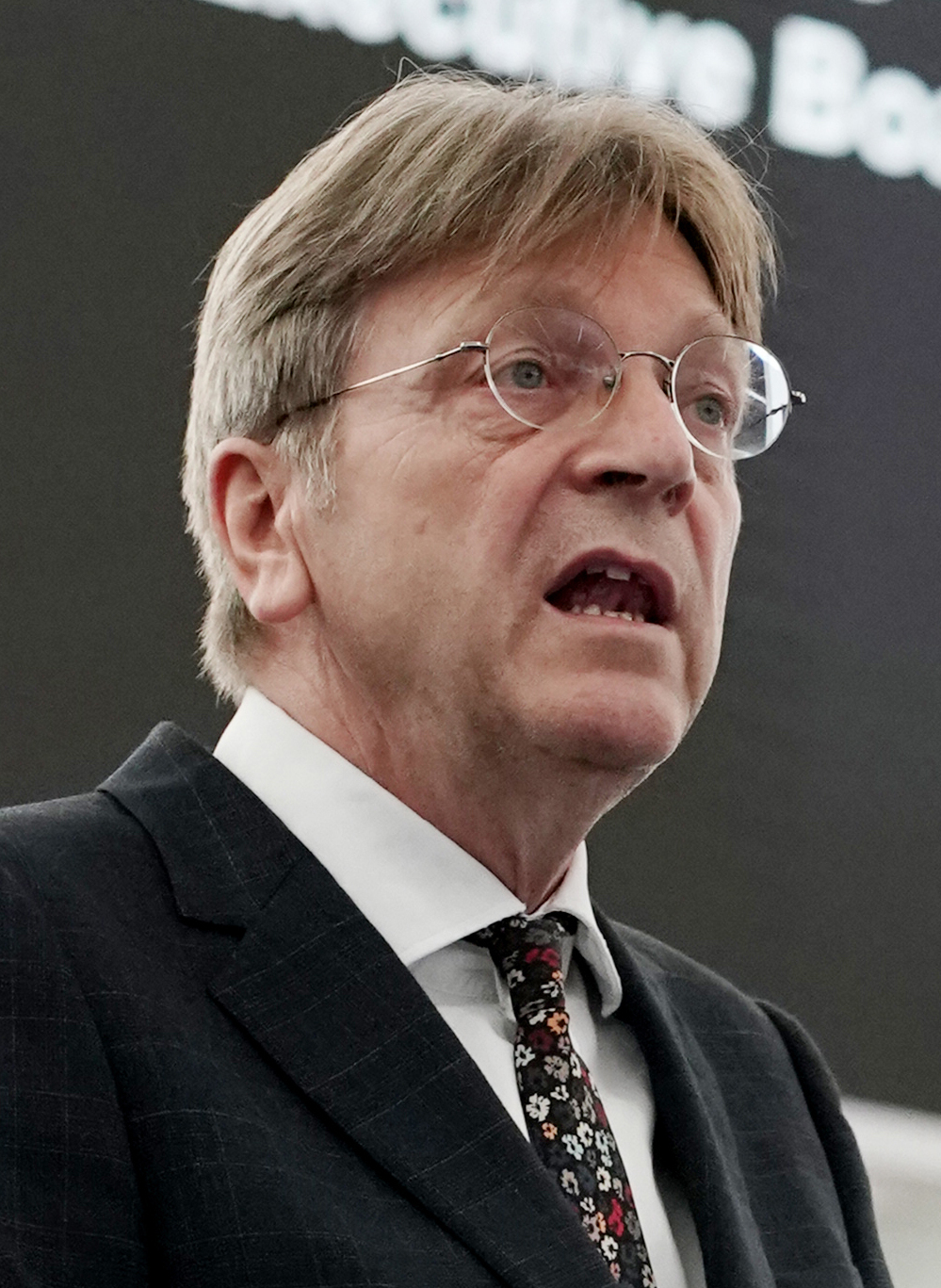
Guy Verhofstadt, 2021

- Vanessa Chinitor (born 1976), singer, born in Dendermonde
- Jo Caudron (born 1968), entrepreneur and author
- Rosiana Coleners (ca.1500–after 1571), poetess
- Franz Courtens (1854–1943), painter, born in Dendermonde
- Polydore de Keyser (1832–1898), Right Honourable Lord Mayor of London, 1887/8
- Pierre-Jean De Smet (1801–1873), missionary among Native Americans
- Jan De Vos (1844–1923), mayor of Antwerp
- Philippe Geubels (born 1981), stand-up comedian
- Emmanuel Hiel, poet and prose writer (1834–1899)
- Kim Kay (pseudonym of Kim Van Hee) (born 1978), Belgian singer, born in Dendermonde
- Willem Kerricx (1652–1719), sculptor
- Fernand Khnopff (1858–1921), painter
- Clément Loret (1833–1909), organist and composer, naturalized French
- Johannes Ockeghem (c. 1410–1497), composer, said to be born in Dendermonde
- James Oliver Van de Velde (1795–1855), bishop of Chicago and, later, of Mississippi
- Michael Pauluzen Van der Voort (ca.1615–1690), early resident of New Amsterdam
- Annelies Verbeke (born 1976), author
- Frans Verhas (ca.1827 – ca.1897), painter
- Jan Verhas (1834–1886), painter
- Dirk Verhofstadt (born 1955), political scientist, born and raised in Dendermonde, brother of Guy Verhofstadt
- Guy Verhofstadt (born 1953), former Belgian prime minister, born and raised in Dendermonde, brother of Dirk Verhofstadt
- Remi Vermeiren (born 1940), businessman, born in Dendermonde
- Cornelis Columbanus Vrancx (1529–1615), writer

=== Sport ===
- Laurens De Bock (born 1992), footballer
- Alwin de Prins (born 1978), competitive swimmer
- Geert De Vlieger (born 1971), Belgian international soccer player
- Femke Hermans (born 1990), boxer, former WBO super-middleweight champion
- Thomas Kaminski (born 1992), Belgian international goalkeeper
- Caroline Maes (born 1982), tennis player
- Bob Straetman (born 1997), footballer
- Ivo Van Damme (1954–1976), middle distance runner
- Pat Van Den Hauwe (born 1960), Welsh international soccer player

== Twin cities ==
- Geldrop, Netherlands
- Nienburg, Germany
- Blagoevgrad, Bulgaria
- Târgu Neamț, Romania

== See also ==
- Inverted Dendermonde, the most valuable Belgian stamp
