= Duolar–Chevalmeire Cycling Team =

Belgian cycling team

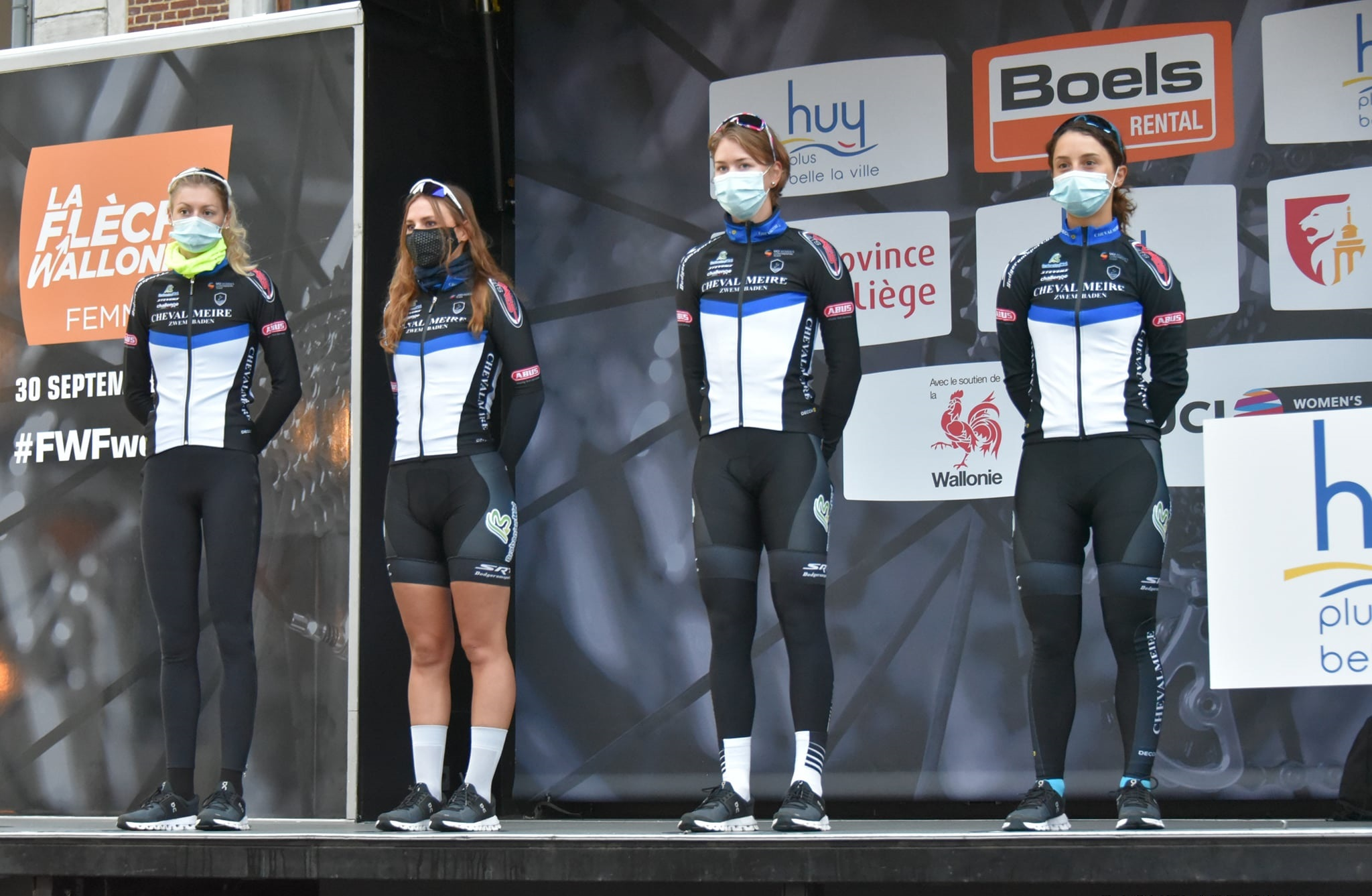

Team information
- UCI code: CCT (2020–)
- Registered: Belgium
- Founded: 2019
- Status: National (2019); UCI Women's Continental Team (2020–)

Team name history
- 2019–2020 2021 2022 2023–: Chevalmeire Cycling Team; Bingoal Casino–Chevalmeire; Bingoal Casino–Chevalmeire-Van Eyck Sport; Duolar–Chevalmeire
Duolar–Chevalmeire Cycling Team jersey
Jersey

Duolar–Chevalmeire is a professional Belgian women's cycling team which participates in elite road races and was established in 2019.

== Team roster ==
As of January 2023.

Rider	Date of birth
Nathalie Bex (BEL)	12 April 1998 (age 28)
Kelly Druyts (BEL)	21 October 1989 (age 36)
Kelly Van den Steen (BEL)	1 September 1995 (age 31)
Tara Gins (BEL)	2 December 1990 (age 35)
Lotte Popelier (BEL)	21 May 2001 (age 25)
Lani Wittevrongel (BEL)	12 July 2004 (age 22)
Cleo Kiekens (BEL)	2 September 2004 (age 22)

Rider	Date of birth
Danique Braam (NED)	5 September 1995 (age 31)
Minke Bakker (NED)	11 March 1997 (age 29)
Malin Eriksen (NOR)	21 January 1997 (age 29)
Antonia Gröndahl (FIN)	25 May 1995 (age 31)
Olha Kulynych (UKR)	1 January 2000 (age 26)
Andrea Martinez Lopez (MEX)	21 January 1994 (age 32)
Taneal Otto (SAF)	5 March 1996 (age 30)

== Major results ==
2021
Schoonaarde Criterium, Lenny Druyts
GP Beerens–Ster van Aartselaar, Thalita de Jong
Limburg Provincial Cyclo-cross Championships Limburg, Nathalie Bex
2022
GP Mazda Schelkens, Danique Braam

== Notable cyclists ==
- Rotem Gafinovitz
