= 2018 Belgium Tour =

2018 Lotto-Belisol Belgium Tour
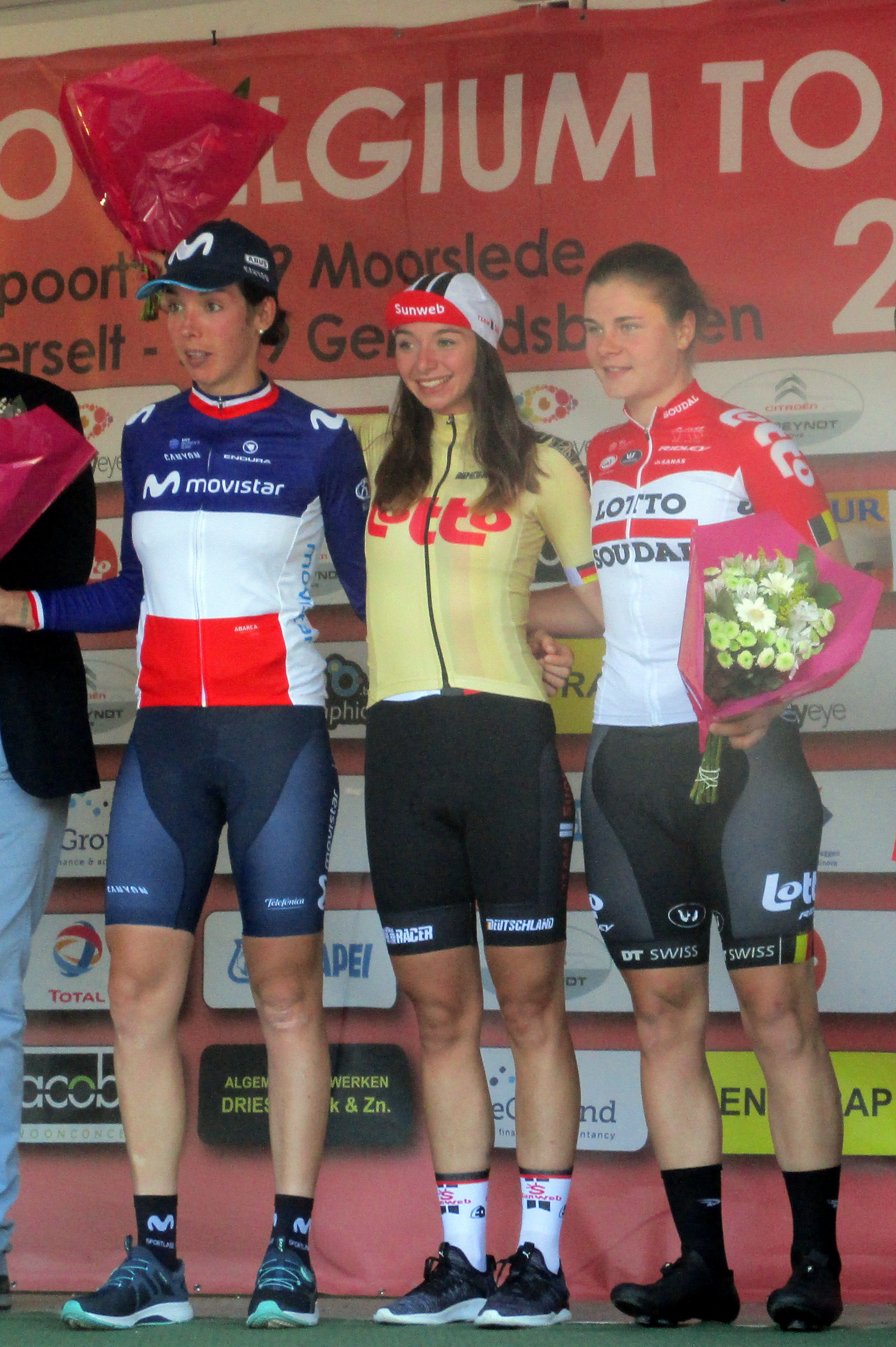
- Final podium: 2. Biannic 1. Lippert 3. Kopecky

Race details
- Dates: 4–7 September 2018
- Stages: 4

Results
Jersey awarded to the overall winner	Winner	Liane Lippert (GER)	(Germany (National team))
	Second	Aude Biannic (FRA)	(Movistar Team)
	Third	Lotte Kopecky (BEL)	(Lotto–Soudal Ladies)
Jersey awarded to the points classification winner	Points	Lotte Kopecky (BEL)	(Lotto–Soudal Ladies)
Jersey awarded to the mountains classification winner	Mountains	Kelly Van den Steen (BEL)	(Lotto–Soudal Ladies)
Jersey awarded to the youth classification winner	Youth	Liane Lippert (GER)	(Germany (National team))
	Team	Movistar Team	

The 2018 Lotto-Belisol Belgium Tour is the sixth edition of the Lotto-Belisol Belgium Tour, previous called Lotto-Decca Tour, a women's cycle stage race in Belgium. The tour has an UCI rating of 2.1.

== Stages ==
List of stages
Stage	Date	Course	Distance	Type	Winner
P	4 September	Nieuwpoort to Nieuwpoort	3.66 km (2.3 mi)	Prologue	Aude Biannic (FRA)
1	5 September	Moorslede to Dadizele	119.3 km (74.1 mi)	Flat stage	Lotte Kopecky (BEL)
2	6 September	Herselt to Herselt	109.9 km (68.3 mi)	Flat stage	Jeanne Korevaar (NED)
3	7 September	Geraardsbergen to Geraardsbergen	115.8 km (72.0 mi)	Flat stage	Liane Lippert (GER)
Total			348.66 km (216.6 mi)		

== Classification leadership ==
Stage	Winner	General classification	Points classification	Mountains classification	Young rider classification	Belgian Riders	Team classification
P	Aude Biannic	Aude Biannic	Aude Biannic	Not awarded	Liane Lippert	Lotte Kopecky	WaowDeals Pro Cycling
1	Lotte Kopecky	Lotte Kopecky	Lotte Kopecky	Kelly Van den Steen	Liane Lippert	Lotte Kopecky	WaowDeals Pro Cycling
2	Jeanne Korevaar	Lotte Kopecky	Lotte Kopecky	Kelly Van den Steen	Jeanne Korevaar	Lotte Kopecky	WaowDeals Pro Cycling
3	Liane Lippert	Liane Lippert	Lotte Kopecky	Kelly Van den Steen	Liane Lippert	Lotte Kopecky	Movistar Team
Final Classification		Liane Lippert	Lotte Kopecky	Kelly Van den Steen	Liane Lippert	Lotte Kopecky	Movistar Team

== See also ==
- 2018 in women's road cycling
