= Paul of Moll =

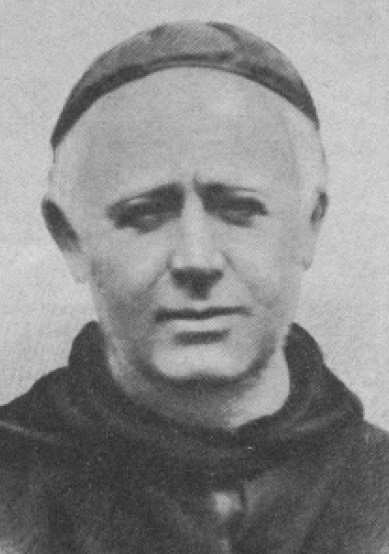
Paul von Moll

Paul of Moll O.S.B. (Dutch Paulus van Mol(l), after his birthplace; civil name Franz Luyckx; born March 7, 1824, in Mol-Millegem and died February 24, 1896, in Dendermonde) was a Belgian Benedictine monk and priest at Dendermonde Abbey. He achieved national importance as a confessor and spiritual director. Numerous reports about him – many of them alleged answers to prayer – were published internationally.

== Biography ==
He came from a financially modest background; his parents were farmers. He entered Dendermonde in 1848. He was ordained a priest in Parma, since the political unrest of his time had made it necessary for him to study abroad. He was involved in the Flemish monastery foundations of Afflighem and Steenbruggen.

== Ministry ==
His priestly work focussed on his activities as a confessor and on preaching and applying the "power of priestly blessings". In addition, Fr. Paul cultivated "an intimate bond with the souls in purgatory". Finally, wide dissemination of the Saint Benedict Medal was of great importance to him. After his death, his grave was soon covered with ex-voto plaques; his remains were transferred to the abbey church of Dendermonde in 1970. Both graves (old and new) were depicted in small publications. News of answers to prayer were published for decades in the German periodical Benediktus-Bote.

Édouard Van Speybrouck's biography, Un thaumaturge au XIXe siècle – Quelques traits de la vie du Très Révérend Père Paul de Moll, Bénédictin (1824–1896) has been translated into English, Spanish, and German and has been reprinted many times. It documents the miracles attributed to him and his spiritual advice. His spiritual legacy is communicated on the homepage of Reichenstein Abbey.

== Literature ==
- Alkuin Schachenmayr: The Troubled Afterlife of Fr. Paul of Moll. American Benedictine Review 75.2 (2024), pp. 146–156.
- Renat van Hecke: Pater Paul von Moll. Gröbenzell bei München: Hacker, 1958.
