= Franz Courtens =

Belgian painter (1854–1943)

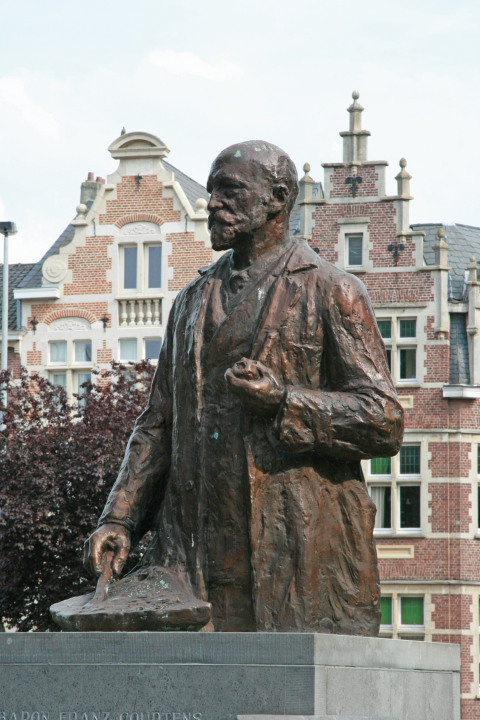
- Statue in Dendermonde by his son Alfred Courtens, presented in 1950 in presence of Queen Elisabeth
- Born: Franciscus Eduardus Maria (Franz) Courtens ca. 1854
- Died: ca. 1943
- Education: Dendermonde School
- Occupation: Painter

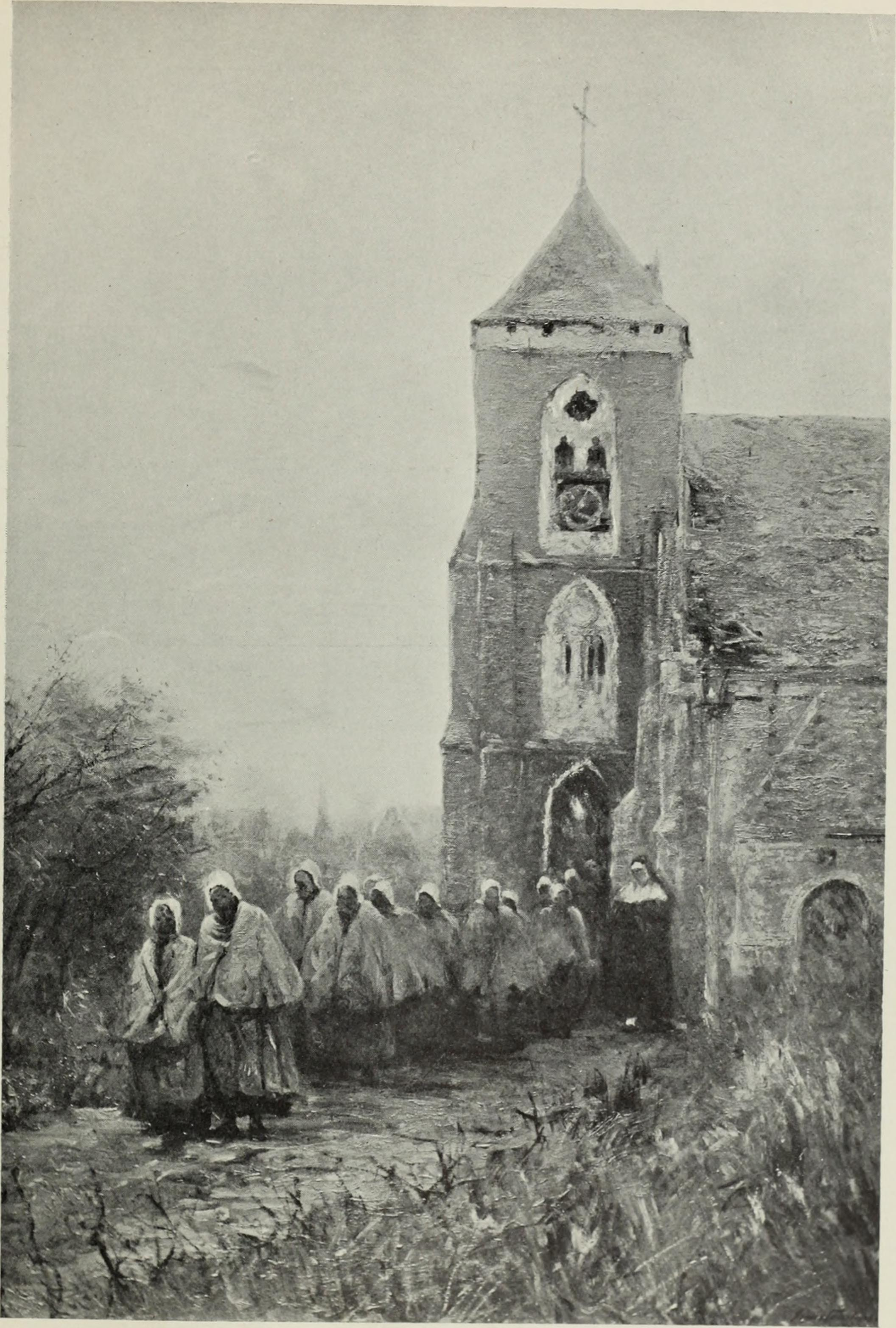

Baron Franciscus Eduardus Maria (Franz) Courtens (1854–1943) was a Belgian painter.

He was a leading figure in the Dendermonde School, famous for his paintings of nature and landscapes. An essay on him by Fernand Khnopff was published in The International Studio 34 (1908). Courtens was professor at the Royal Academy of Fine Arts (NHISKA) in Antwerp from 1904 till 1924.

He was a personal friend of Leopold II, who gave him the privilege of free access to the royal Parc of Laeken. Some of his paintings remain in the Royal collection.

== Family ==
Since 1922, the family belongs to the Belgian nobility.

Baron Franz Courtens:
painter, member of Royal Academy of Science, Letters and Fine Arts of Belgium, 1904.

  - Baron Hermann Courtens, (1884-1956): painter
    - Baron Pierre Courtens, (1921-2004): artist
    - Jacques Courtens, (1926-1988): painter
  - Alfred Courtens, (1889-1967): sculptor
  - Antoine Courtens, (1899-1969): architect, studied with Baron Victor Horta,
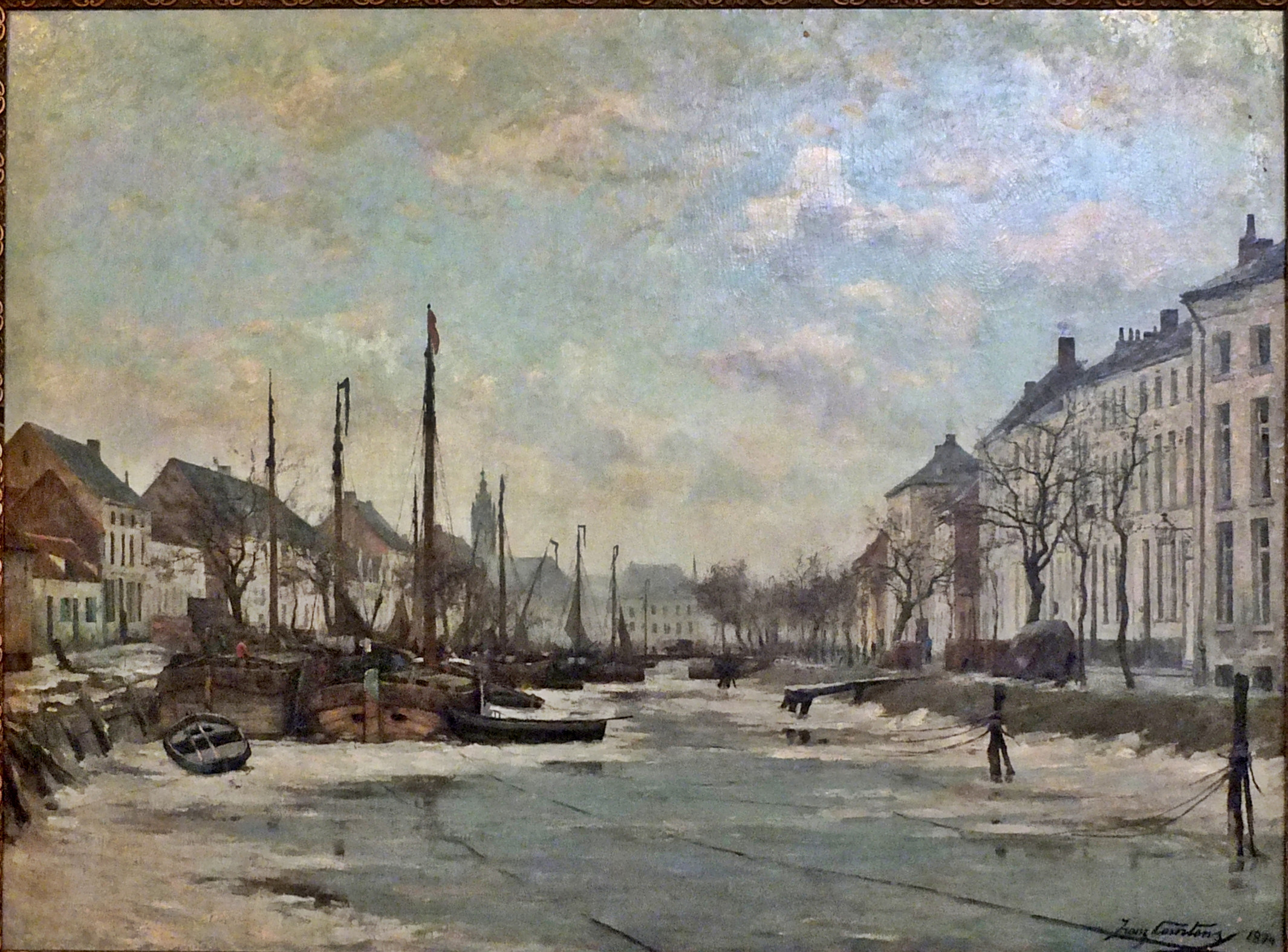
Thaw in Dendermonde (Le dégel à Termonde), 1879, oil on canvas, 166 × 231 cm

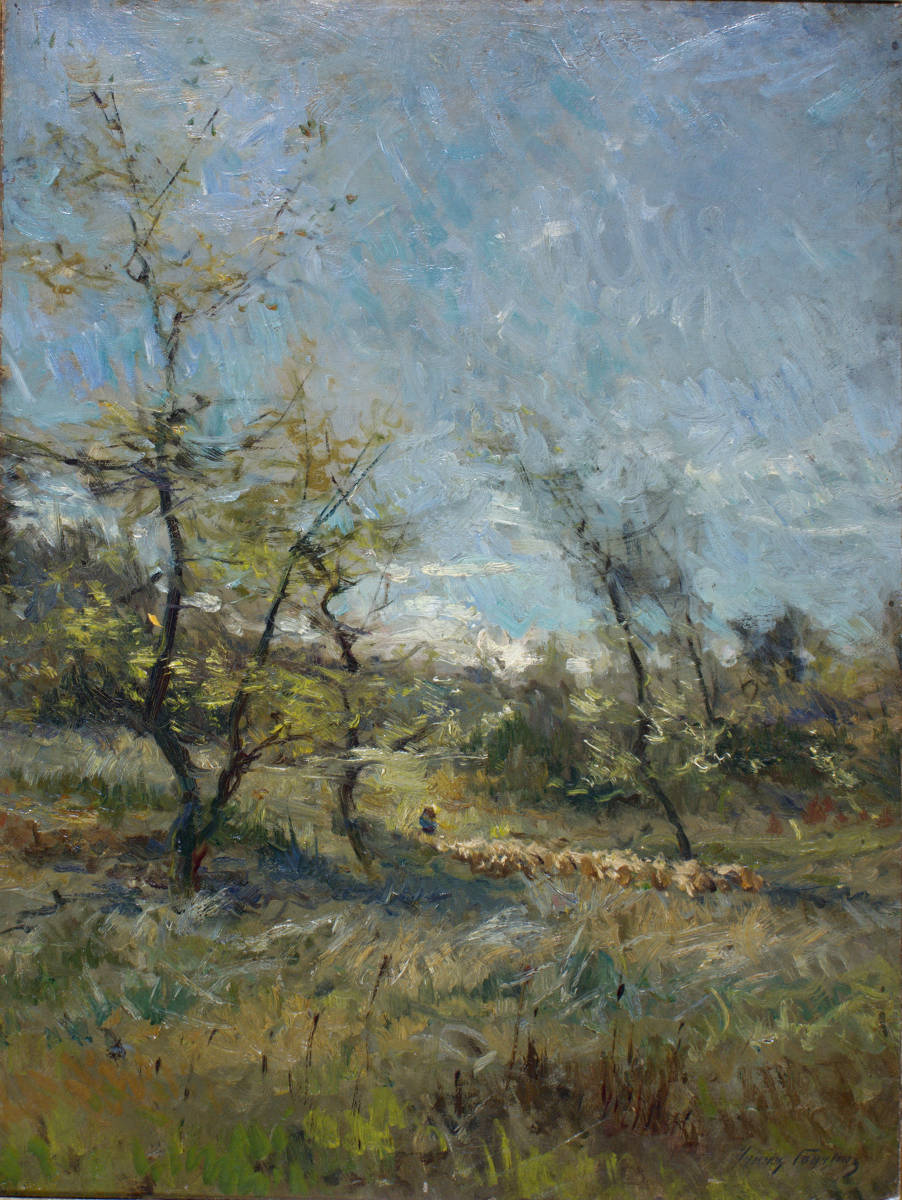
Flock in Kempen (Troupeau en Campine), oil on canvas, 80 x 60 cm

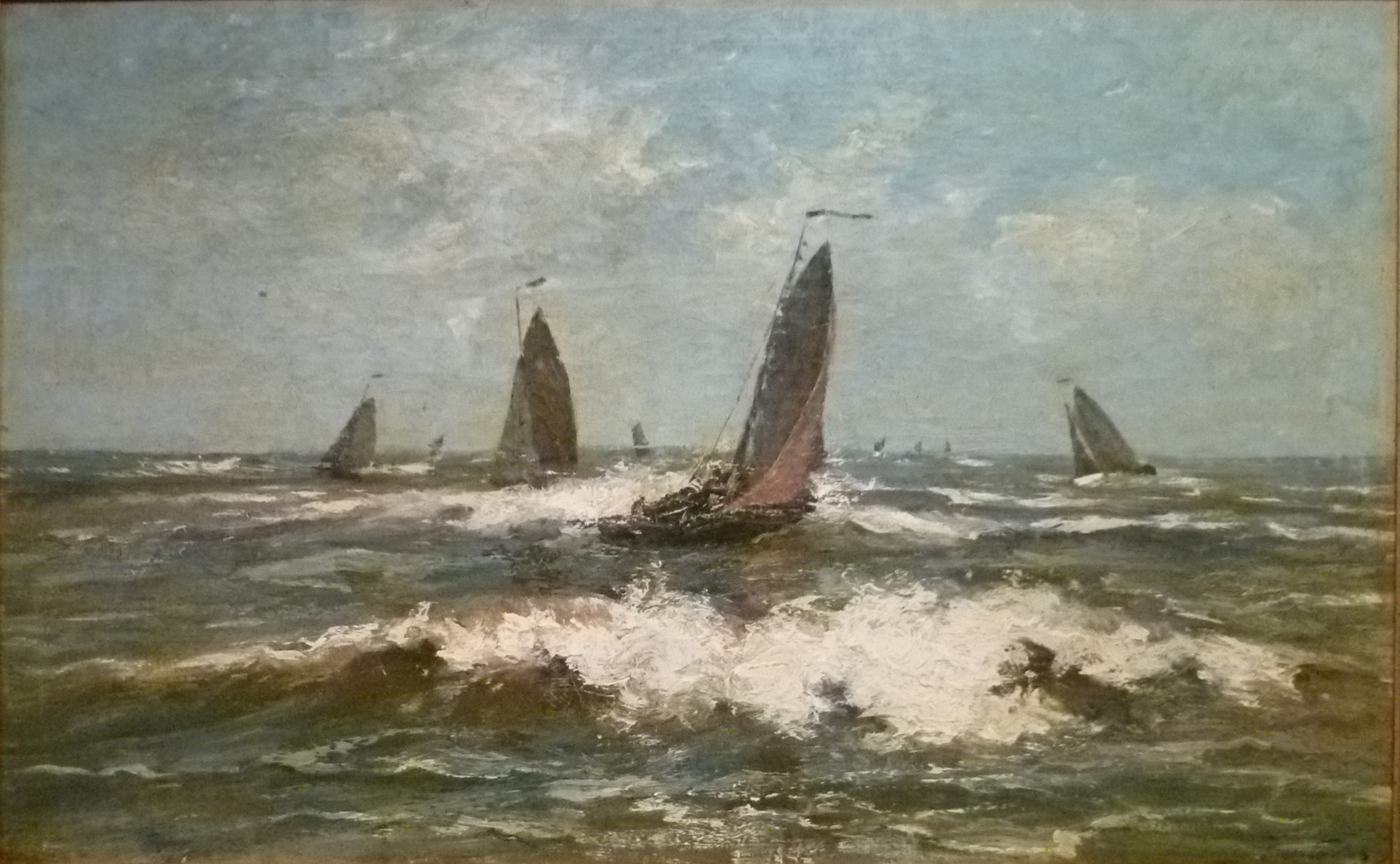
The wave (La vague), ca. 1926, oil on canvas, 51 × 85 cm

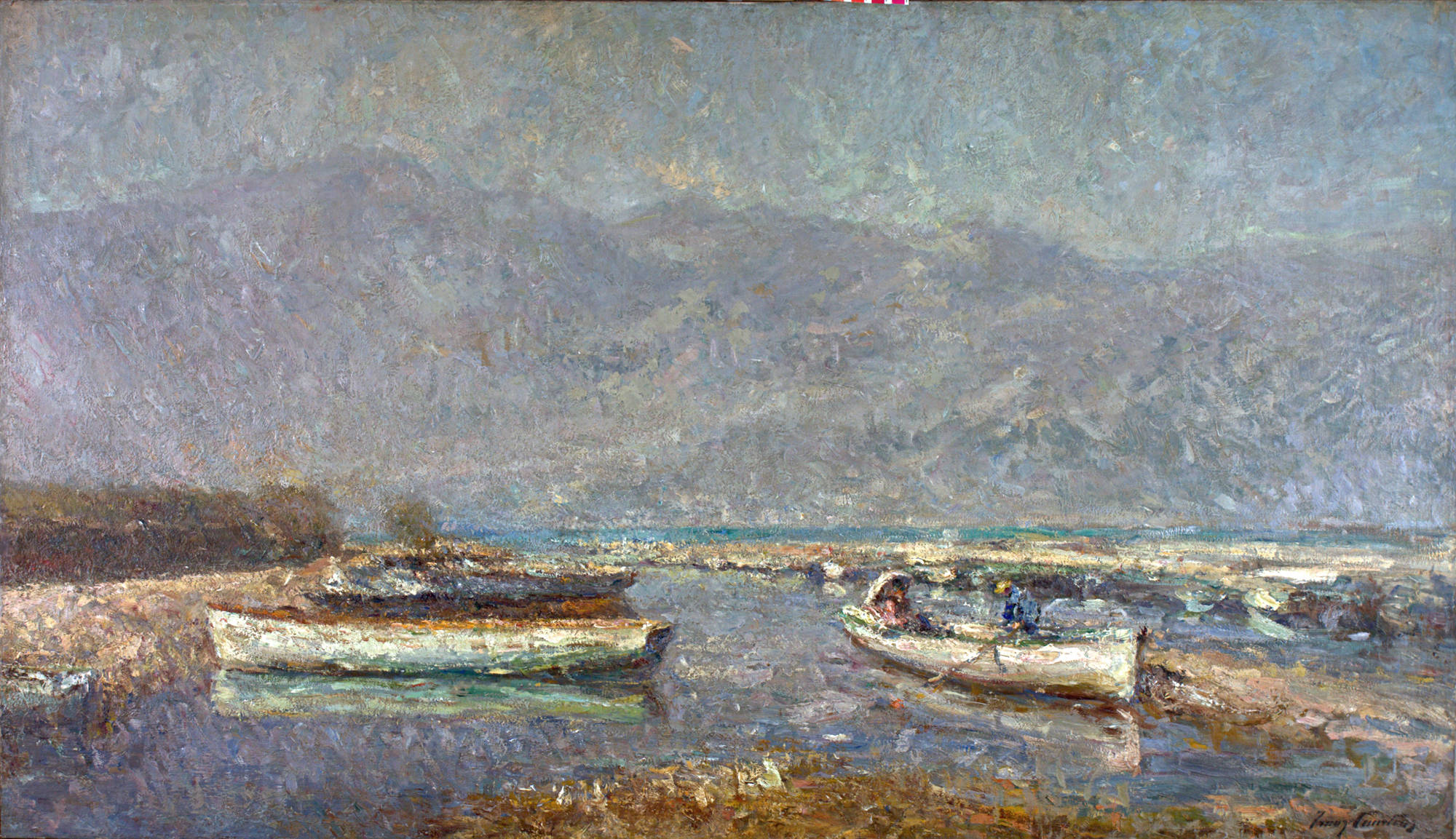
Lake of Bourget (Lac du Bourget), 1926, oil on canvas, 110 x 190 cm

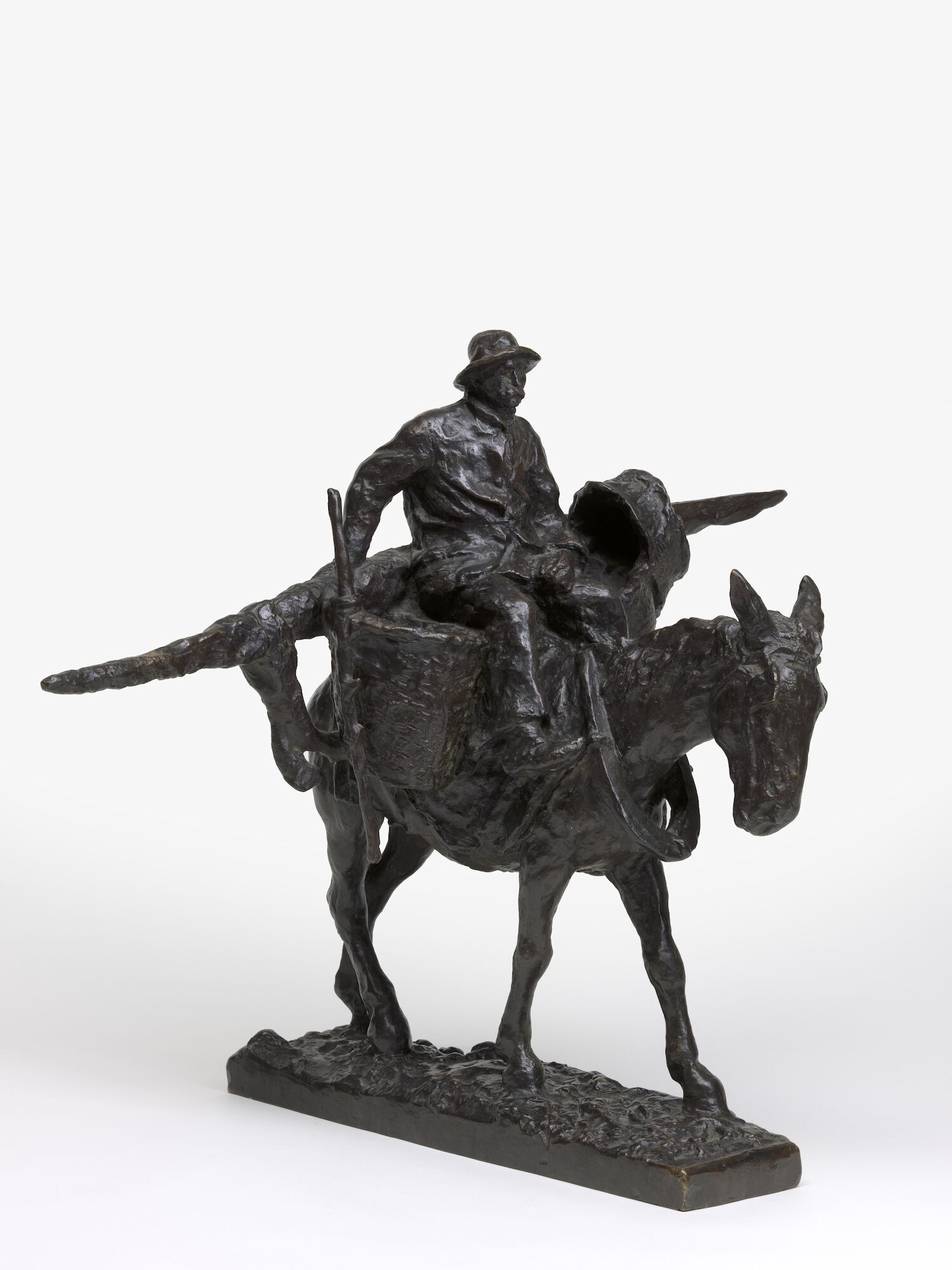
Shrimp fisherman on mule, NAVIGO National Fisheries Museum

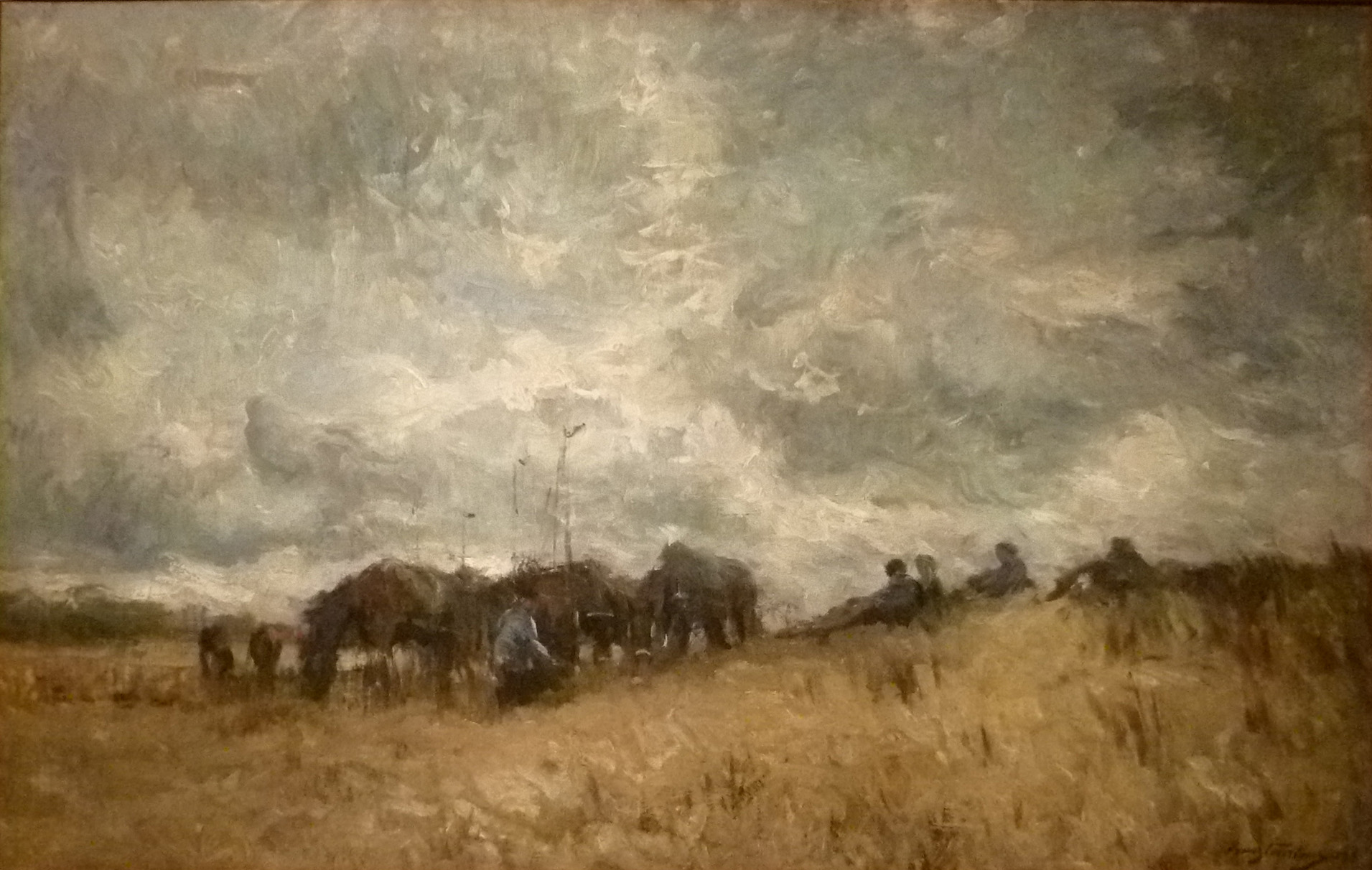
Resting in the dune (Le repos dans la dune), last painting from the artist 1935, oil on canvas, 75 × 110 cm

== Honours ==
- 1922: created Baron Courtens by Royal order.
- Grand Officer in the Order of the Crown.
- Member of the Royal Academy of Science, Letters and Fine Arts of Belgium.
