= Rosiana Coleners =

Southern Netherlandish poet

Rosiana Coleners (Dendermonde, circa 1500 – Dendermonde, 1560 or after 1571) was a Southern Netherlandish poet.

She was born in Dendermonde. In her time, Coleners was friends with Anna Bijns and Lucas d'Heere. Only one poem by Coleners has survived, because it was later printed by Lucas d'Heere in Den Hof ende Boomgaerd der Poësien. It was a response to a poem by d'Heere addressed to "d'exellente Rosiane".
