= Tara Gins =

Belgian cyclist

Personal information
- Full name: Tara Gins
- Born: 2 December 1990 (age 35)

Cycling career
- Sport: Cycling
- Current team: Duolar-Chevalmeire
- Discipline: Road
- Role: Rider

Amateur team
- 2021–2022: Get Coached Cycling Team

Professional teams
- 2016–2017: Lares–Waowdeals
- 2018: Health Mate–Cyclelive Team
- 2020: Memorial–Santos
- 2023-: Duolar-Chevalmeire

Managerial team
- 2019–2020: S-Bikes Bodhi Cycling

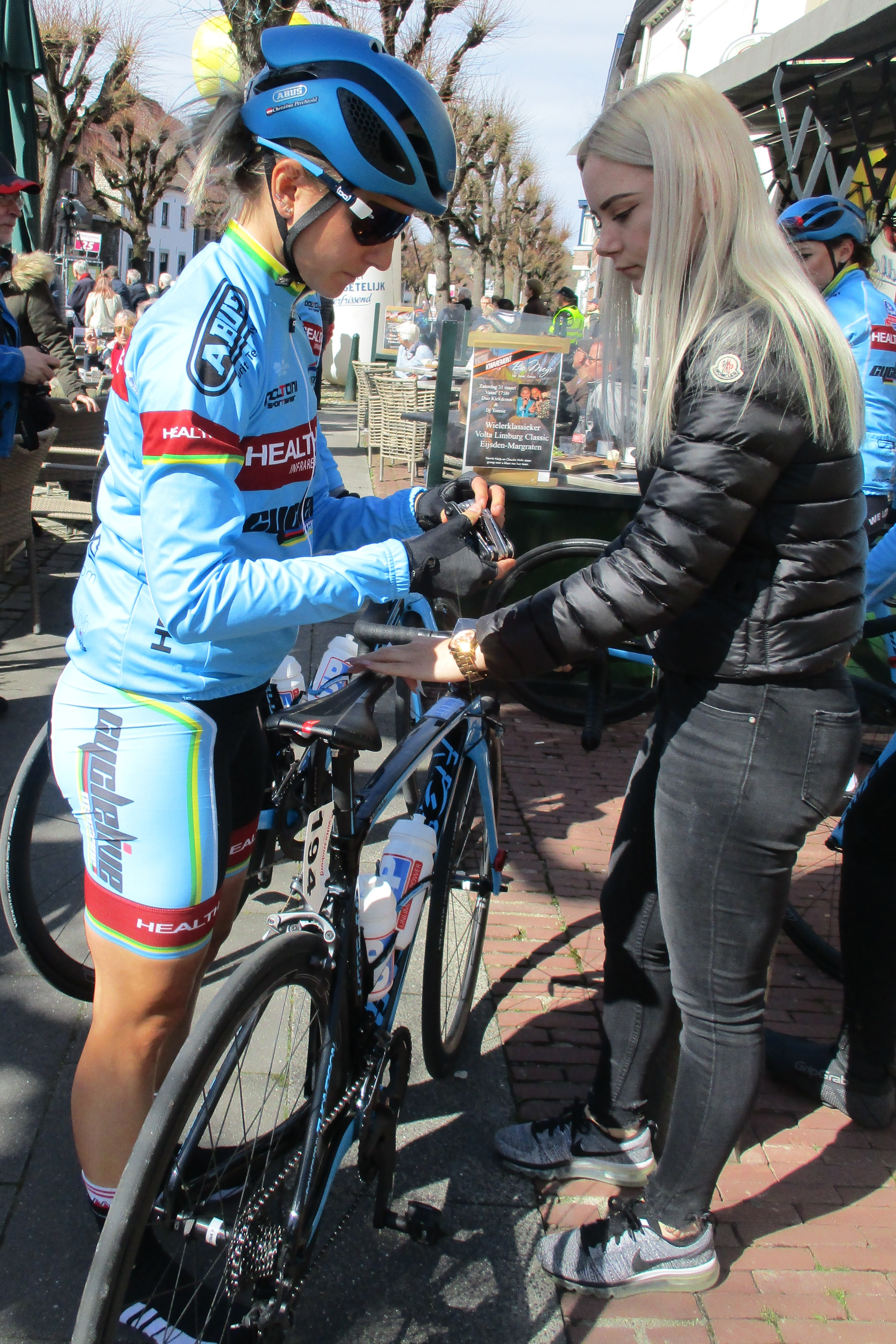
Volta Limburg Classic 2018

Tara Gins (born 2 December 1990) is a Belgian racing cyclist, who currently rides for Belgian pro team Duolar-Chevalmeire. Gins has also ridden professionally between 2016 and 2020 for the Lares–Waowdeals, Health Mate–Cyclelive Team and Memorial–Santos squads, and also worked as a directeur sportif for Belgian amateur team S-Bikes AGU.

== See also ==
- List of 2016 UCI Women's Teams and riders
