= Jo Caudron =

Entrepreneur from Belgium (born 1968)

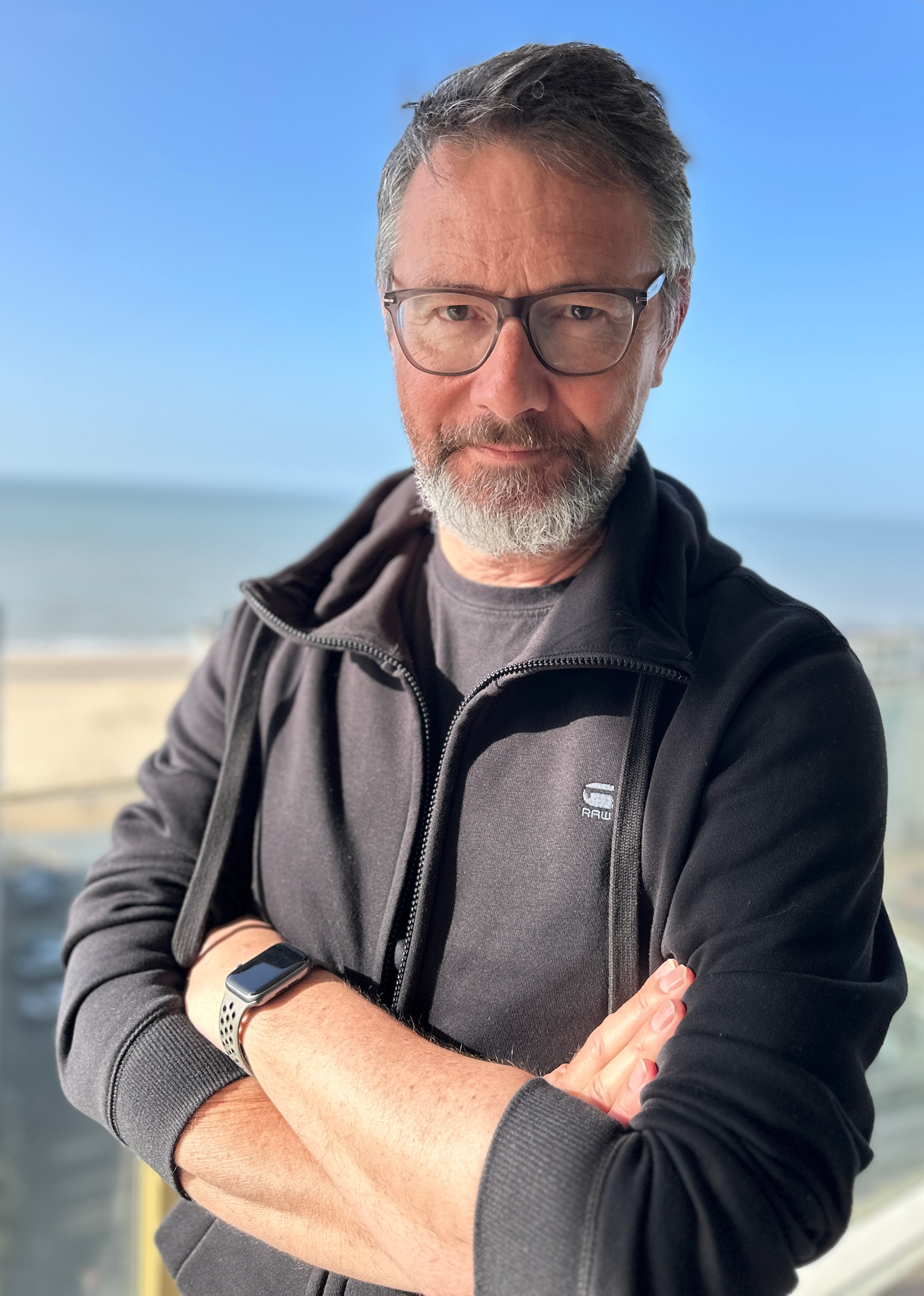
- Born: 1968 (age 57–58)
- Citizenship: Belgian
- Occupations: Entrpreneur; Author; Consultant

Jo Caudron (born 1968 in Dendermonde) is a Belgian entrepreneur, author and consultant. In 1993, he founded the web agency The Reference, one of the first in Belgium. His 2019 book De wereld is rond won the 2020 Managementboek van het Jaar, a Dutch management-book award.

== Career ==
Caudron grew up in Dendermonde, where he attended secondary school at the Heilig Maagdcollege. He enrolled in a university programme in Slavic studies but left after one year.

In 1993, he founded The Reference, one of Belgium's first web agencies. Early clients included the newspaper De Tijd, the Efteling theme park, Cera Bank, and Studio Brussel. The company later expanded into The Reference Group, which included the technology firm xCA.

Peter Rodrigues was appointed chief executive at the end of 1999. Caudron stepped down as head of the company in 2000 and left in 2003. The Reference was sold to the British company Algo Vision in 2002, and he remained a member of its board until 2005.

Caudron subsequently co-founded more than twenty digital companies, including Webware (1996), tvAgency, The Originals (2003) and the web agency One (2006).

In 2009, he and Dado Van Peteghem founded the consultancy DearMedia. The company became part of the Duval Union group in 2015 and was renamed Duval Union Consulting. In 2020, it continued under the name Scopernia, where Caudron advises organisations on digital and business transformation.

In 2025, he contributed to a trend report on the news and media sector published by Future Media Hubs, an innovation network of the Flemish public broadcaster VRT.

Caudron has authored several books. De wereld is rond (2019), published in English in 2020 as The World is Round, received the 2020 Managementboek van het Jaar award. De toekomstformule (2023) examined long-term economic and social change. In en andere slechte ideeën voor de toekomst (2025), published in English as Fuck the System – and Other Bad Ideas for the Future, he discusses Europe, technology and geopolitical developments.

== Bibliography ==
- Haal meer uit sociale media (2010). ISBN 978-94-6058-055-0.
- Media Morgen – de media op zijn kop (2011). ISBN 978-90-816984-1-2.
- Digital Transformation: bereid je organisatie voor op de toekomst (2014, with Dado Van Peteghem). ISBN 978-94-014-1890-4.
- Vlaanderen Inc. Het nieuwe tv kijken (2014, with Geert Wellens, Leo Neels and Dirk Wauters). ISBN 978-94-014-2129-4.
- De wereld is rond (2019). ISBN 978-94-6337-215-2. Published in English as The World is Round: An Optimistic Master Plan for the Transformation of Business and Society (2020). ISBN 978-94-6337-250-3.
- De toekomstformule (2023). ISBN 978-94-6337-821-5.
- Fuck the System, en andere slechte ideeën voor de toekomst (2025). ISBN 978-90-209-9817-7.
