= Schoonaarde =

- Village
- Interactive map of Schoonaarde
- Coordinates: 51°00′18″N 4°00′54″E
- Country: Belgium
- Region: Flanders
- Province: East Flanders
- Municipality: Dendermonde

Area
  - Total: 5.72 km^{2} (2.21 sq mi)

Population (1 January 2025)
  - Total: 2,538
  - Density: 444/km^{2} (1,150/sq mi)
- Postal code: 9200
- Area code: 052

Schoonaarde is a village in the Flemish Region of Belgium, located in the province of East Flanders. It is a submunicipality of Dendermonde and lies along the Scheldt in the regions of Scheldeland and the Denderstreek. The village is connected to Berlare by a bridge.

== History ==
Schoonaarde originated as a small settlement centered around a chapel dedicated to Our Lady of Sorrows, which existed as early as the early 15th century. In 1873, the settlement was separated from Wichelen by royal decree and became an independent municipality, largely due to the demands of residents who found travel to Wichelen inconvenient.

The name "Schoonaarde" translates roughly to “beautiful land” or “favorable landing place,” referring to its location along the Scheldt River, which historically facilitated transport and trade.

In 1837, the railway line between Mechelen and Ghent was constructed through the area, contributing to the development of the village. A station was later established, improving both passenger and freight transport.

During the First World War, Schoonaarde was the site of military action, including fighting related to crossings of the Scheldt River.

In 1977, as part of the municipal reorganization in Belgium, Schoonaarde was merged into the municipality of Dendermonde.

== Geography ==
Schoonaarde is situated along the Scheldt River at an elevation of approximately 8–9 meters above sea level. The surrounding landscape consists mainly of sandy and sandy-loam soils.

== Economy ==
A chemical industry developed in Schoonaarde at the end of the 19th century. In 1896, a chemical plant was established, later associated with the German company BASF. After the First World War, the factory was confiscated and reorganized under Belgian ownership, eventually becoming part of Union Chimique Belge. Industrial decline began in the mid-20th century due to outdated infrastructure.

== Culture ==
The inhabitants of Schoonaarde are colloquially known as plekkers, a nickname derived from the traditional craft of clog making.
