= Dendermonde Codex =

12th century manuscript of songs

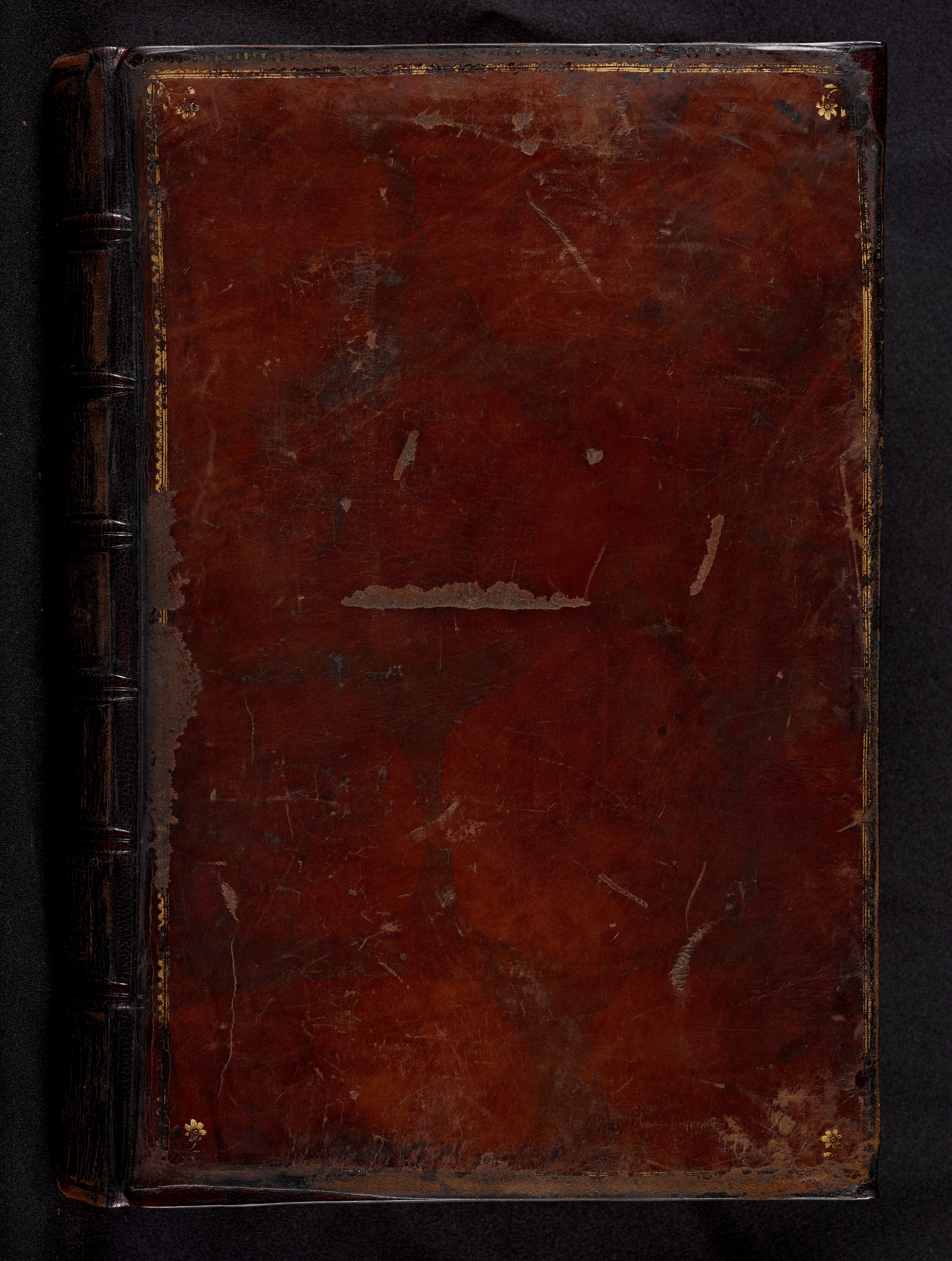
The Codex; 1150 - 1175

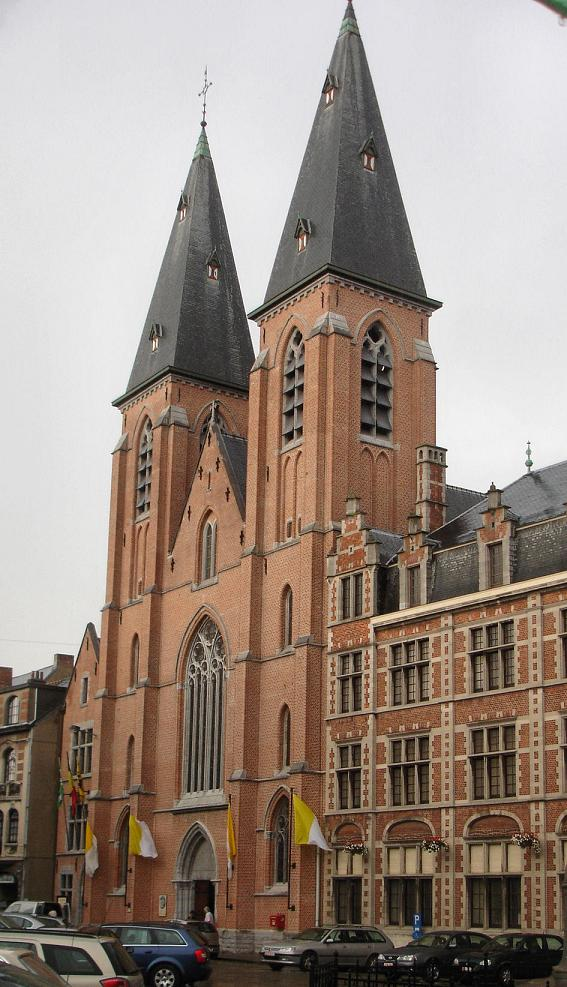
the basilica of Dendermonde Abbey.

The Dendermonde Codex or sometimes called Villarenser Kodex or codex 9 of Dendermonde Abbey, is a valuable manuscript containing the Symphonia harmoniae caelestium revelationum of Hildegard of Bingen.

== History ==
This valuable manuscript is owned by Dendermonde Abbey. Historians believe it was first sent to the Belgian Villers Abbey, hence the name Villarensis. It then moved to Gembloux Abbey and finally it arrived in the famous Affligem Abbey, where the monks were chased out in 1796. In 1837, the Affligem community re-established conventual life in Dendermonde. When a colony of monks from Dendermonde returned to the original site of Affligem Abbey, the manuscript remained in Dendermonde. The Bingen manuscript is considered the most valuable of the library, and is world famous.

In August 2017, the abbey entrusted the manuscript to the library of the Faculty of Theology at the Catholic University of Leuven for conservation.

== The Manuscript ==
The collection of songs inside the codex was named by Hildegard Symphonia Harmoniae Caelestium Revelationum.

The current manuscript is not complete as several folios are missing. However, it still contains 183 folios, made of parchment, containing 60 psalms and cantica in honour of the Holy Father and Son. It is dated ca. 1176 AD and is considered one of the major works by Hildegard of Bingen.

=== Compositions ===
- 1. frondens Virga
- 2. O splendissima gemma
- 3. Ave Maria, o auctrix vite
- 4. O eterne Deus
- 5. O clarissima mater
- 6. O gloriosissimi lux
- 7. Cum processit factura digiti Die
- 8. O tu suavissima virga

== See also ==
- Wiesbaden Codex
