= Dendermonde Abbey =

Benedictine monastery in Belgium

Coordinates: 51.0296°N 4.0998°E

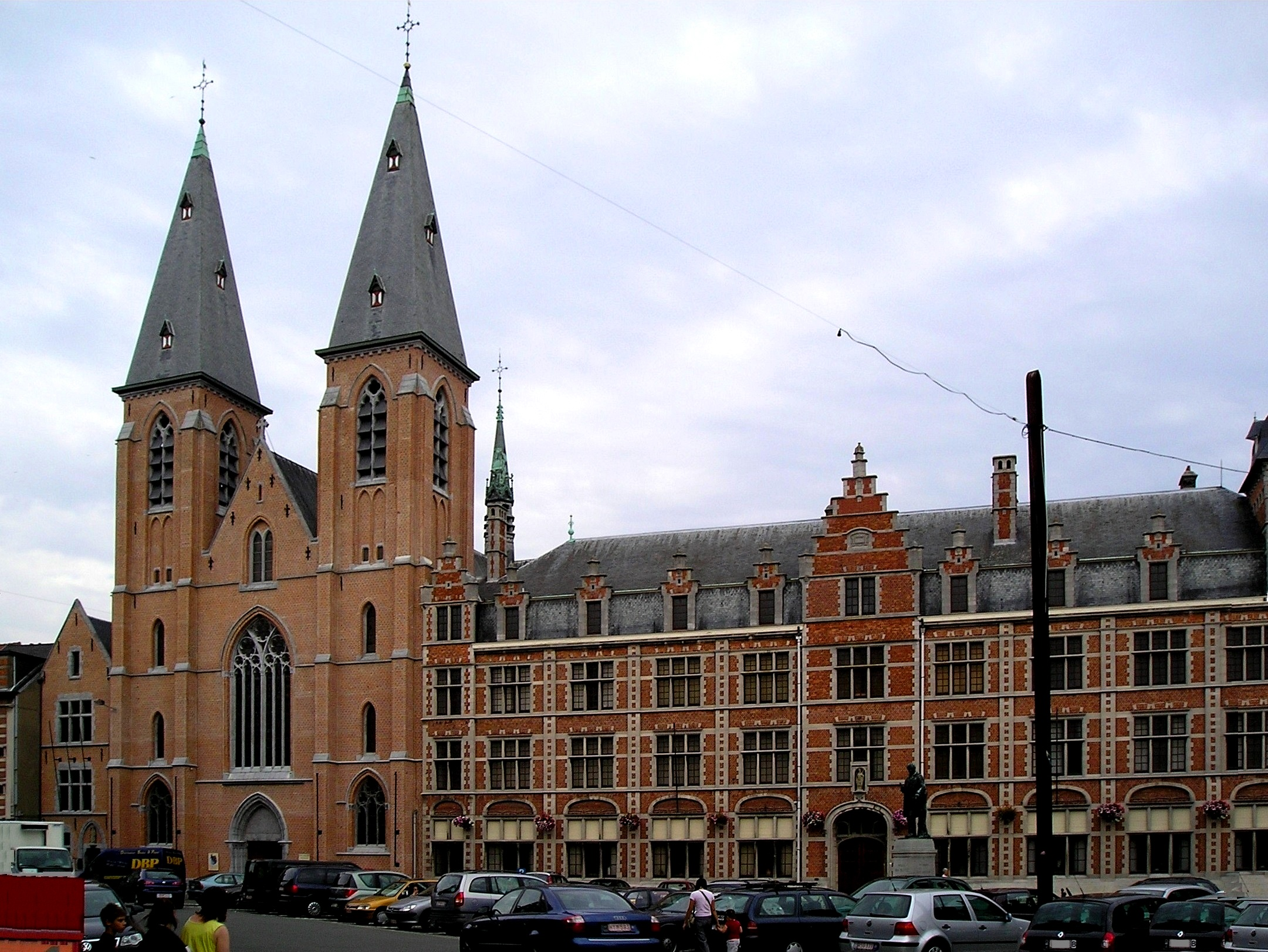
Dendermonde Abbey (2005)

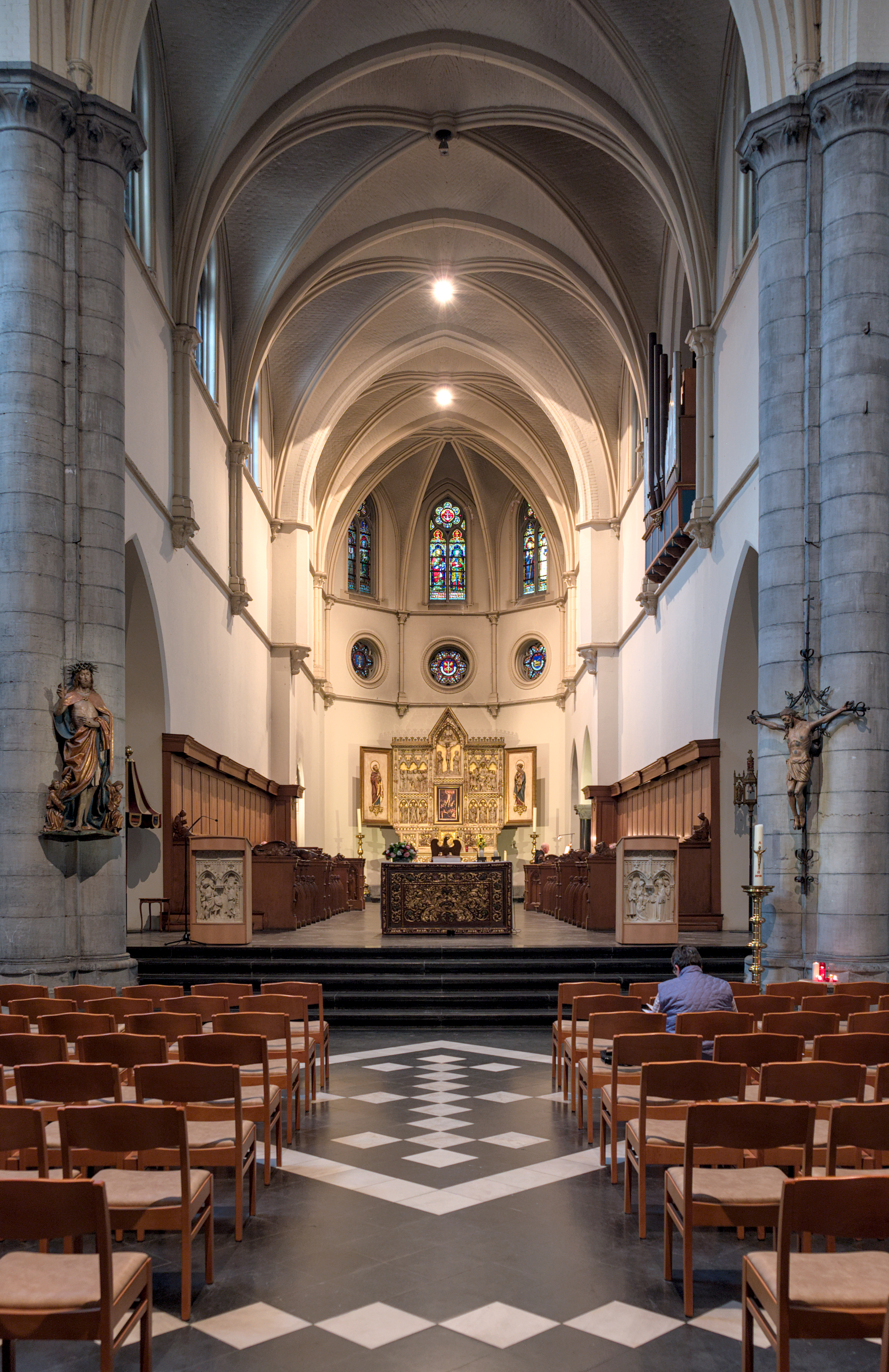
Interior of the abbey church

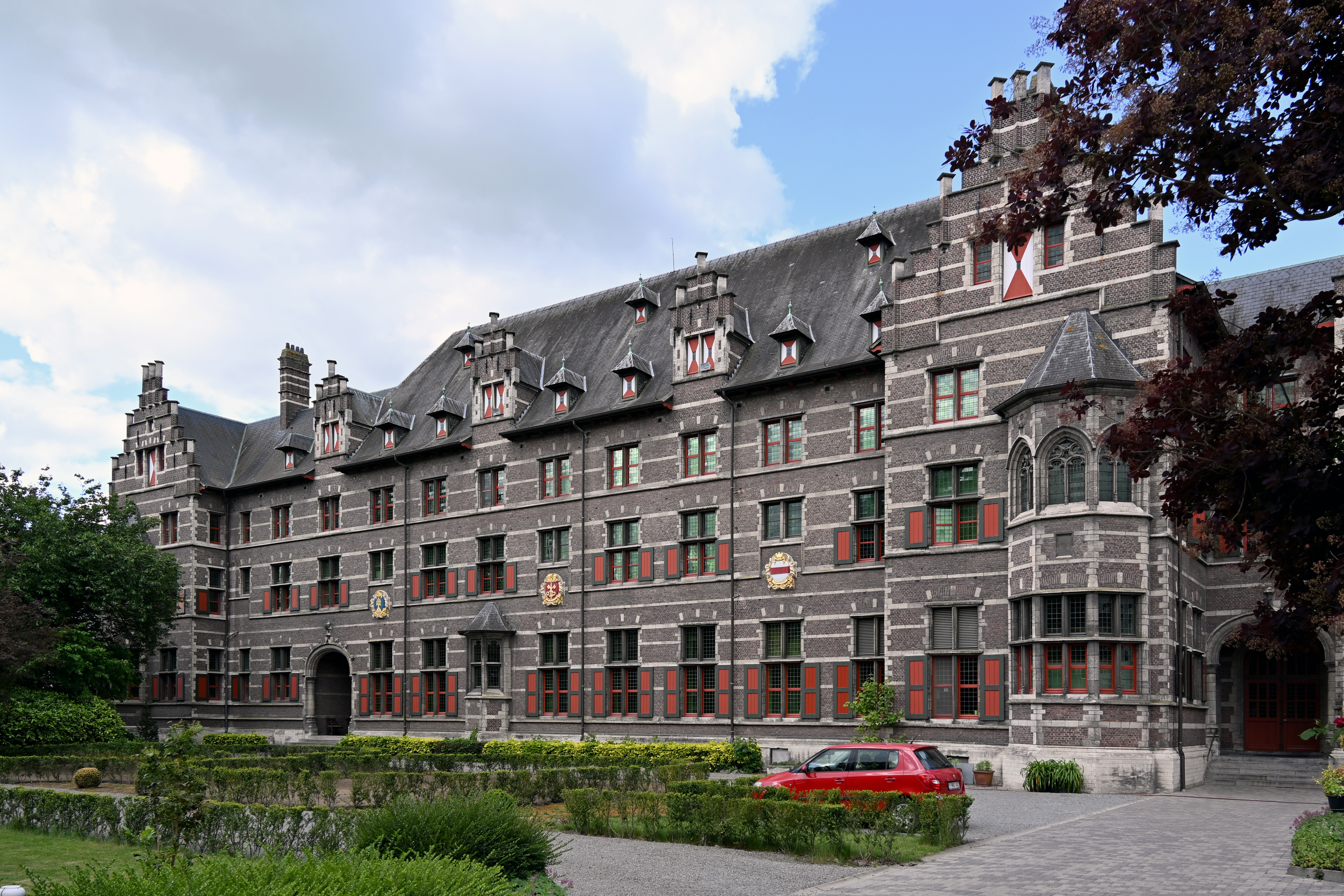
Garden façade (2025)

Dendermonde Abbey or the Abbey of Saints Peter and Paul (founded 1837) is a Benedictine monastery in Dendermonde (Belgium), which played a role in the Liturgical Movement in Belgium.

== History ==
In 1837, under the leadership of Dom Veremundus D’Haens, the community of Affligem Abbey, dispersed since 1796, re-established their conventual life in buildings bought from the committee for the relief of poverty in the town of Dendermonde. These buildings were the site of a former Capuchin house, founded 1596 and suppressed in 1797. The church attached to the buildings had been reopened as a public chapel in 1815. In 1841 the community in Dendermonde was recognised as the continuation of the community founded in Affligem in the 12th century. A royal order of 1842 reserved the abbey church for public use. By 1846 there were twelve monks in the community, and in 1850 the monastery was incorporated into the Cassinese Congregation.

In 1868 the community acquired the remnants of their original house in Affligem, and in 1870 a colony of monks from Dendermonde was sent to Affligem to repopulate the abbey there.

In 1890–1910, Dendermonde Abbey became a centre of the Liturgical Movement in Belgium. The abbey church was demolished to be replaced by a larger structure in 1901–1902. The new church was consecrated by Antoon Stillemans, bishop of Ghent, on 19 August 1902.

Most of the original conventual buildings in Dendermonde were destroyed by fire in 1914, but the church remained standing. Rebuilding commenced in 1919 and was completed in 1924, in Flemish Neo-Renaissance style. In 1939 the abbey church became a basilica.

In 1945 a school was established that was closed in 2000. The school buildings were demolished in 2019 to be replaced by flats.

The monastery buildings were listed as a protected monument in 2003 and as built heritage in 2010.

== See also ==
- Dendermonde Codex
