= Appels =

Town in Dendermonde, Belgium

- Town
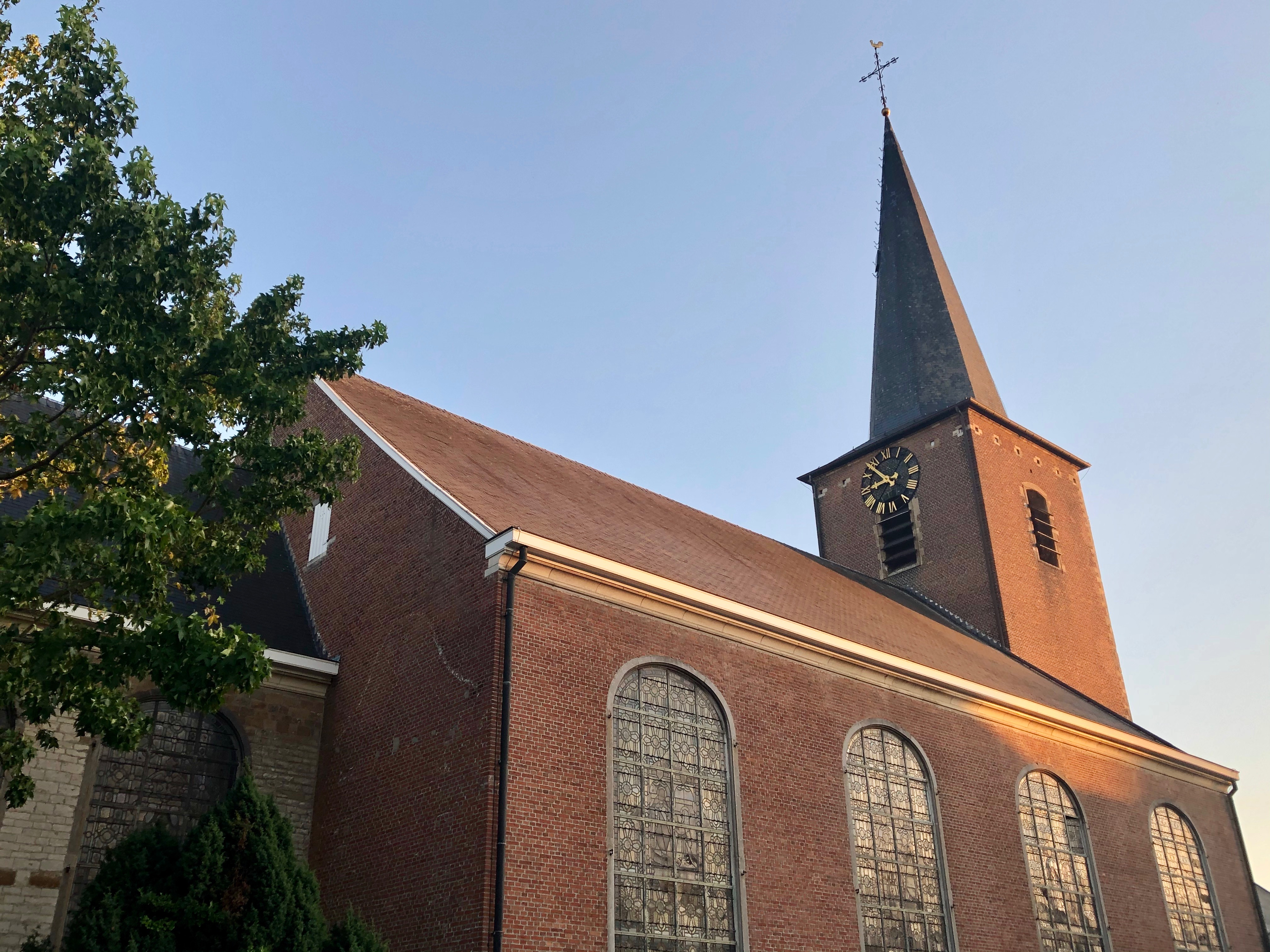

- Flag

- Location in Belgium
- Coordinates: 51°01′46″N 04°03′15″E
- Country: Belgium
- Region: Flemish Region
- Province: East Flanders
- Municipality: Dendermonde

Area
  - Total: 3.95 km^{2} (1.53 sq mi)

Population (2020-01-01)
  - Total: 2,848
  - Density: 721/km^{2} (1,870/sq mi)
- Time zone: CET
- Postal code: 9200
- Area code: 052

Appels is a town in the Flemish province of East Flanders in Belgium. It is part of the municipality Dendermonde.

In 1125 the place is referred to as Apls, a Celtic word for water.

Appels is located near the river Scheldt and is home to Appels Veer, one of the oldest, still operating ferry slips and services in the country. Appels Veer was mentioned in a document confirming the transfer of rights to operate it from Guy of Dampierre, Count of Flanders, to Gregorius, Lord of Appels, in 1253.

== Events ==
Every year, in July, the largest county fair in Dendermonde is held in Appels. During that weekend an Ommegang featuring the Peird van Appels, a large processional giant depicting the magical horse Bayard, is celebrated.

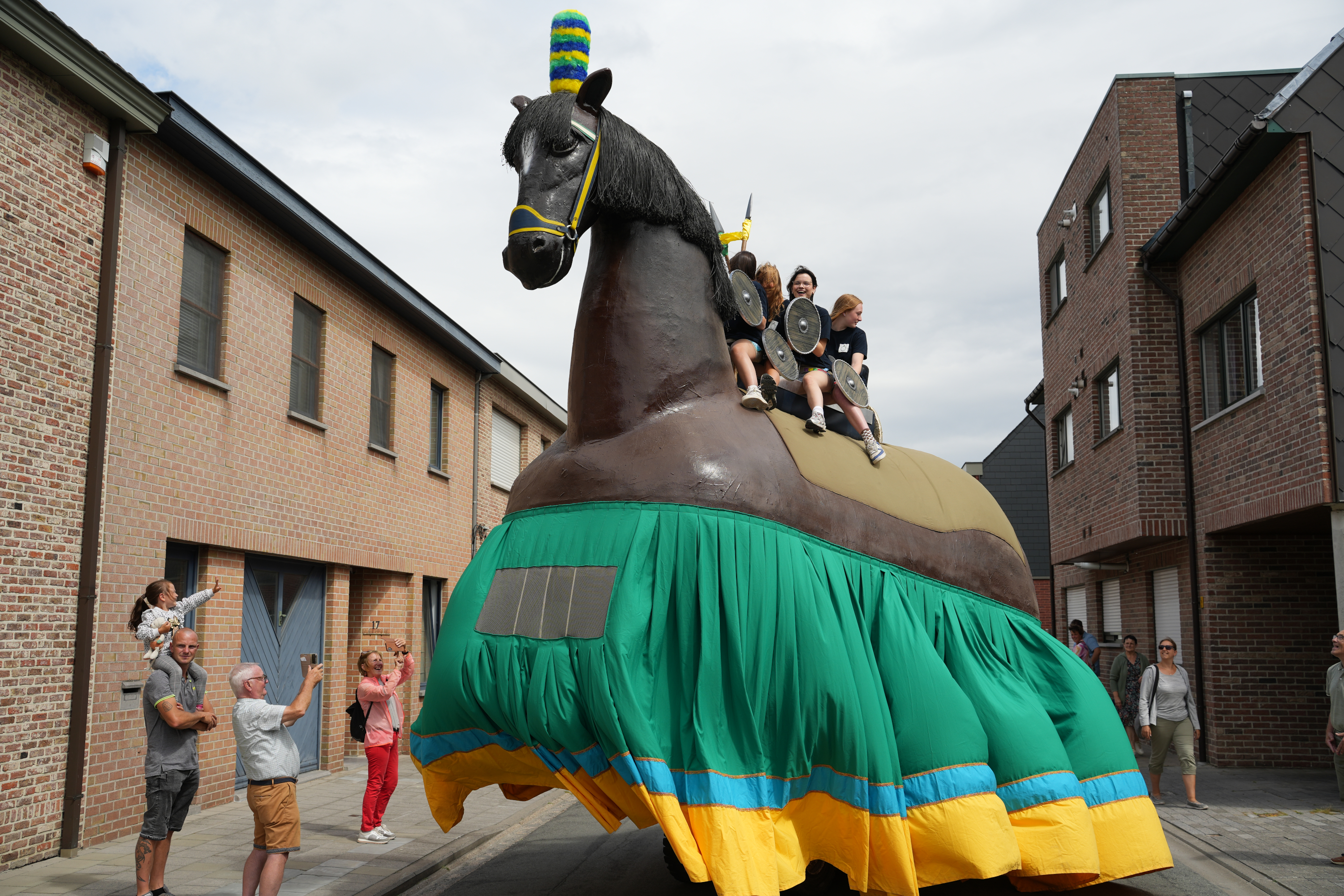
Peird van Appels

== Dragonhead ==
In 1934 a dredge found an oak ship fragment that became known as the Appels dragonhead. It was originally thought to be Viking and was sold to the British Museum. Closer investigation revealed it to be Late Roman Iron Age and most likely Saxon in origin.
