= Kelly Van den Steen =

Belgian cyclist

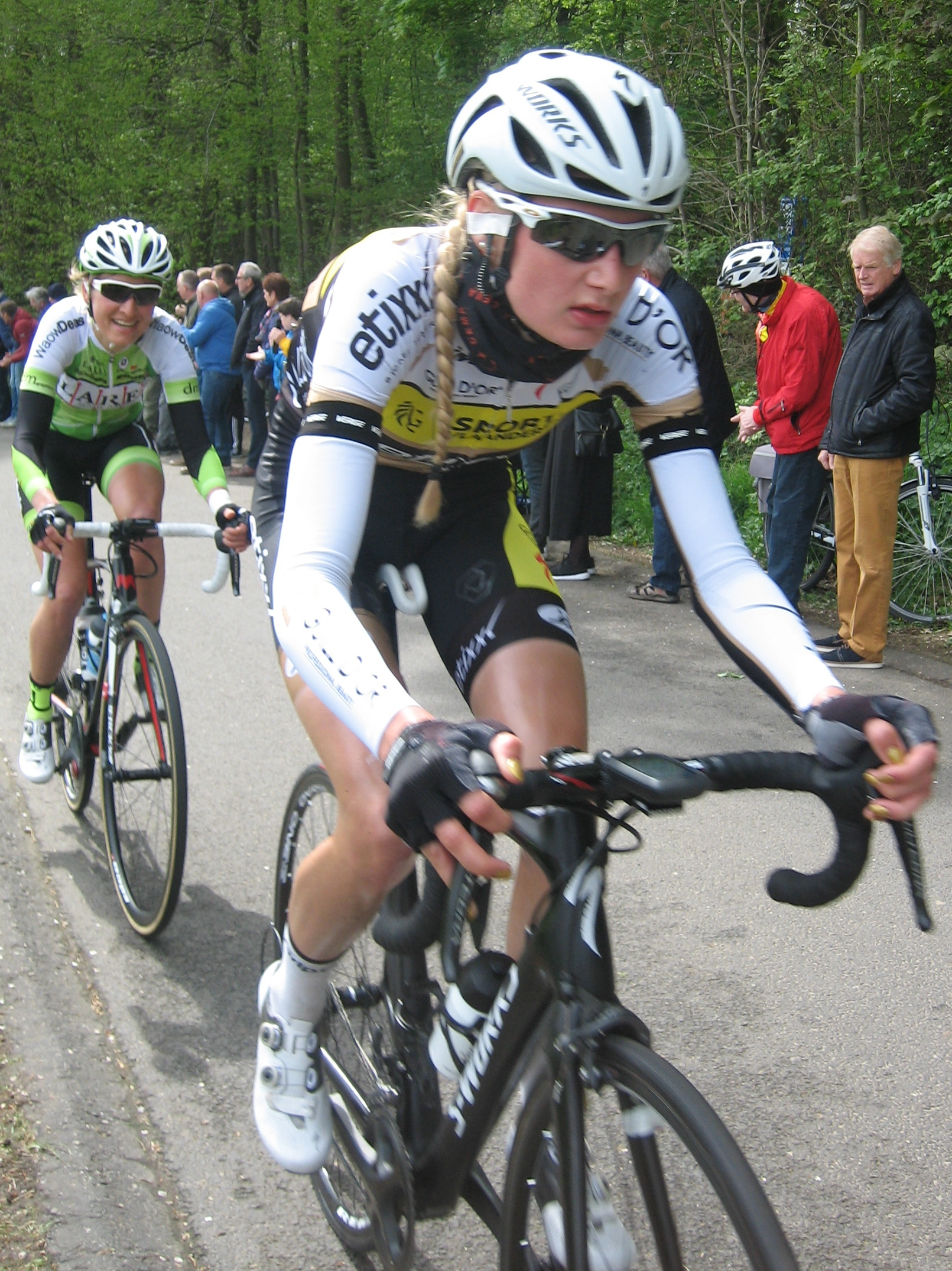
- Van den Steen in the 2017 Amstel Gold Race

Personal information
- Full name: Kelly Van den Steen
- Born: 1 September 1995 (age 31) Belgium

Cycling career
- Sport: Cycling
- Discipline: Road
- Role: Rider

Professional teams
- 2014–2017: Topsport Vlaanderen–Pro-Duo
- 2018–2019: Lotto–Soudal Ladies
- 2020–2023: Chevalmeire Cycling Team

Kelly Van den Steen (born 1 September 1995) is a Belgian racing cyclist, who most recently rode for UCI Women's Continental Team Chevalmeire. She rode at the 2014 UCI Road World Championships. In August 2021 she married Michael Vanthourenhout.
