= Chicotte River =

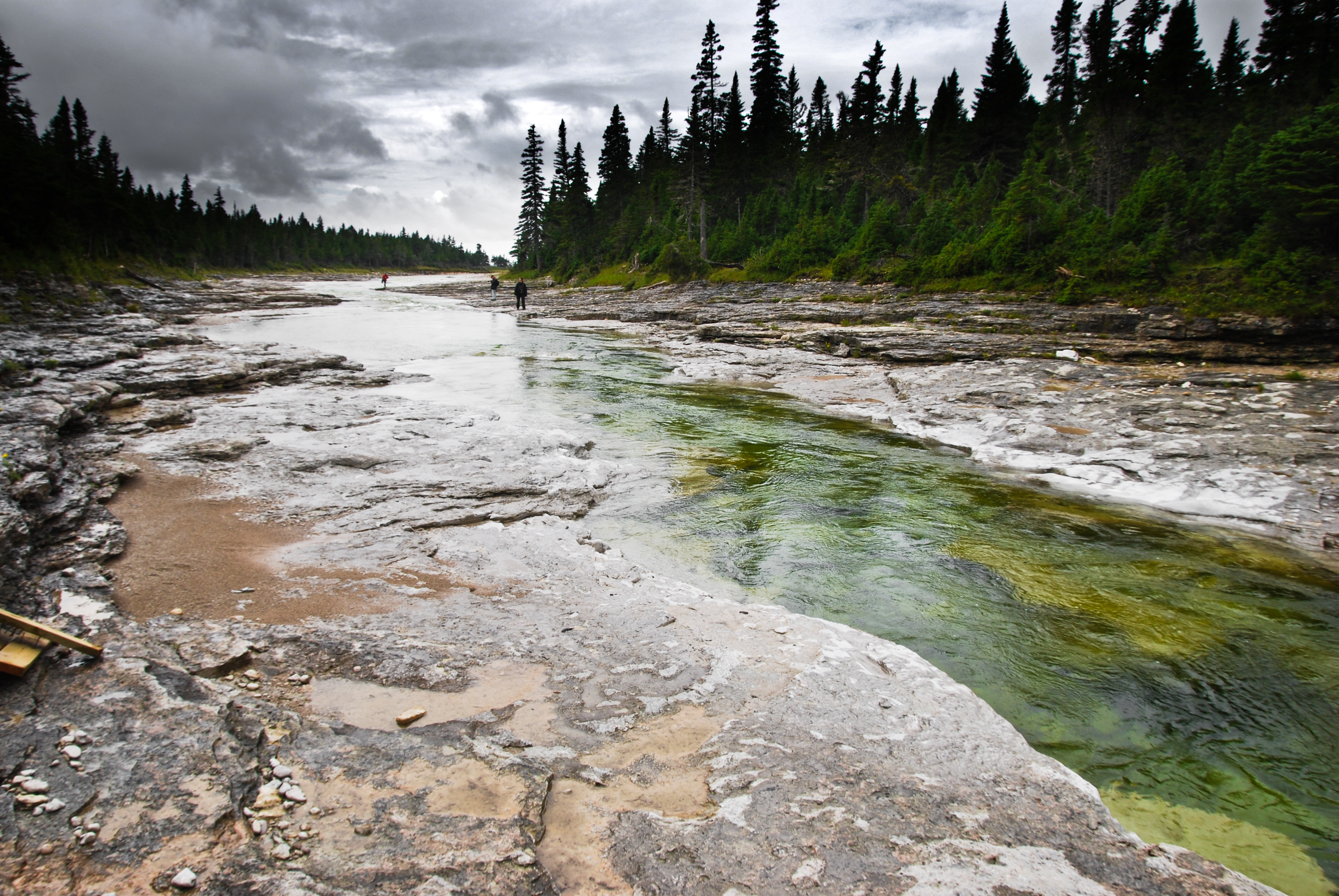
- Chicotte River in the Anticosti National Park.

Location
- Country: Canada
- Province: Quebec
- Region: Côte-Nord
- Regional County Municipality: Minganie Regional County Municipality

Physical characteristics
- Source: Confluence of two mountain streams
  - location: L'Île-d'Anticosti
  - coordinates: 49.41178°N 63.08848°W
  - elevation: 243 m (797 ft)
- Mouth: Gulf of Saint Lawrence
  - location: L'Île-d'Anticosti
  - coordinates: 49.22389°N 63.0475°W
  - elevation: 1 m (3.3 ft)
- Length: 26.2 km (16.3 mi)

Basin features
- Tributaries
  - left: (upstream) 12 streams (coming from the northeast), a small river, 4 other streams.
  - right: 4 streams.

The Chicotte River (French: Rivière Chicotte) is a tributary of the Gulf of Saint Lawrence, flowing in the municipality of L'Île-d'Anticosti, in the Minganie Regional County Municipality, in the administrative region of North Shore, in province of Quebec, in Canada.

A forest road (north–south direction) serves the west side of this valley and another on the east side; these roads connect to the south the coastal road of the island (east–west direction). These roads are mainly used for forestry and recreational tourism activities.

Forestry is the main economic activity in this area, particularly through Anticosti National Park which covers the upper part of the river; recreational tourism activities, second.

== Geography ==
The Chicotte River draws its source from a mountain stream (altitude: 243 m (797 ft)), located in the south-central part of the island. This source is located in a forest area at:

- 101.9 km (63.3 mi) east of the town center of the village of Port-Menier;
- 35.6 km (22.1 mi) south of the north shore of Anticosti Island;
- 17.8 km (11.1 mi) northeast of the south shore of Anticosti Island.

From its source, the Chicotte River descends between the Rivière aux Rats (located on the west side) and the Rivière aux Plats (east side). The Chicotte River generally flows towards the southeast and the south over 26.2 km (16.3 mi) with a drop of 242 m (794 ft), according to the following segments:

- 8.8 m (29 ft) first to the south to a bend in the river corresponding to a stream (coming from the northwest); then towards the south-east in an increasingly deep valley, collecting a stream (coming from the north), until the discharge (coming from the north) of a small river;
- 8.4 km (5.2 mi) in a deep valley, first towards the south-east leaving the territory of Anticosti National Park after about 2.1 km (1.3 mi) of this segment, up to a bend in the river; then south, curving south-east at the end of the segment, until the outlet of a stream (coming from the north-west);
- 9.0 km (5.6 mi) first to the southeast in a deep valley until a bend in the river; towards the south curving towards the south-east; passing under the forest road bridge that runs along the southern coast of Anticosti Island; by crossing the Petit canyon Chicotte and passing in front of the locality Chicotte la Mer at the end of the segment, to its mouth.

The Chicotte River empties on the south shore of Anticosti Island, in the Gulf of Saint Lawrence, on the west side of Cap des Caps. This confluence is located at 2.1 km (1.3 mi) east of Pointe des Morts, at 14.1 km (8.8 mi) east of the mouth of the Galiote River and at 115.2 km (71.6 mi) east of the village center of Port-Menier.

== Toponymy ==
The toponymic designation "Chicotte River" appears on an 1856 map of Anticosti Island by geologist James Richardson. The spelling "Chicotte" derives from the English pronunciation of the French word "chicot", meaning debris of trees or shrubs.

The toponym “rivière Chicotte” was made official on December 5, 1968.

== Recreational tourism activities ==
Anticosti National Park has an appendix to the southwest, that is, to the south of Lake Jolliet and to the south of the forest road leading southeast to Lake Martin; this park appendix covers approximately 10.9 km (6.8 mi) of the upper reaches of the Chicotte River. A path allows you to contemplate nature on the south shore, between the limit of the national park and the course of the river.

== See also ==
- Minganie Regional County Municipality
- L'Île-d'Anticosti, a Municipality
- Anticosti Island, an island
- Anticosti National Park
- Honguedo Strait
- Gulf of Saint Lawrence
- List of rivers of Quebec
