= Rivière aux Rats (Anticosti Island) =

Location
- Country: Canada
- Province: Quebec
- Region: Côte-Nord
- Regional County Municipality: Minganie Regional County Municipality

Physical characteristics
- Source: Confluence of two mountain streams
  - location: L'Île-d'Anticosti
  - coordinates: 49.35887°N 63.10210°W
  - elevation: 171 m (561 ft)
- Mouth: Gulf of Saint Lawrence
  - location: L'Île-d'Anticosti
  - coordinates: 49.24194°N 63.11805°W
  - elevation: 1 m (3.3 ft)
- Length: 18.3 km (11.4 mi)

Basin features
- Tributaries
  - left: (upstream)

The rivière aux Rats (English: Rats River) is a tributary of the Gulf of Saint Lawrence, flowing in the municipality of L'Île-d'Anticosti, in the Minganie Regional County Municipality, in the administrative region of Côte-Nord, in province of Quebec, in Canada.

A forest road (north–south direction) serves the area between the Rats river and the Chicotte river. This road connects the Grand-Lac-Salé Ecological Reserve to the south, and the main road passing through the center-north of the island.

Forestry is the main economic activity in this area; recreational tourism activities, in particular hunting and fishing.

== Geography ==
The Rats River has its source at the confluence of two mountain streams (altitude: 171 m (561 ft)), located in the south-central part of the island. This source is located in a forest area at:

- 2.9 km (1.8 mi) to the southwest of the course of the Chicotte River;
- 104.2 km (64.7 mi) east of the town center of the village of Port-Menier;
- 40.7 km (25.3 mi) south of the north shore of Anticosti Island;
- 12.2 km (7.6 mi) northeast of the south shore of Anticosti Island.

From its source, the Rats River flows on 18.3 km (11.4 mi) with a drop of 170 m (560 ft), according to the following segments:

- 5.7 m (19 ft) to the south, curving to the west, collecting two streams (coming from the northeast) and one stream (coming from the northwest), to the discharge (coming from the east) of a lake;
- 10.0 m (32.8 ft) first south collecting a stream (coming from the northwest), curving to the southeast, then collecting a stream (coming from the north), until a bend in the river, corresponding to a stream (coming from the north);
- 2.6 km (1.6 mi) towards the southwest, passing under the forest road bridge that runs along the southern coast of Anticosti Island, and forming a small hook to the north, until its mouth.

The Rats River flows on the east side of Gand lac Salé, Petit lac Salé, Baie des Sables and the Côte de la Grande Traversée, on the south shore of Anticosti Island, in the gulf of Saint Lawrence. This confluence is located at:

- 3.4 km (2.1 mi) west of Pointe des Morts;
- 5.4 km (3.4 mi) west of the mouth of the Chicotte River;
- 8.8 km (5.5 mi) east of the mouth of the Galiote River;
- 110 km (68 mi) east of the center of the village of Port-Menier.

== Toponymy ==
This toponymic designation appeared in 1955 on a map of the Consolidated Bathurst company.

The toponym "rivière aux Rats" was made official on September 12, 1974, at the Place Names Bank of the Commission de toponymie du Québec.

== Lac-Salé Ecological Reserve ==
In 1991, the Quebec government established the "Lac-Salé Ecological Reserve" covering approximately 7000 hectares. Briefly, this reserve was delimited by the middle of the rivière du Brick from its confluence with the Honguedo Strait, going up the river to latitude 5,468,000 m N; thence, easterly, to the center of the Chicotte River; then south following the center of the latter river, until its confluence with the Honguedo Strait.

== See also ==
- List of rivers of Quebec
