= Galiote River =

Location
- Country: Canada
- Province: Quebec
- Region: Côte-Nord
- Regional County Municipality: Minganie Regional County Municipality

Physical characteristics
- Source: Confluence of two mountain streams
  - location: L'Île-d'Anticosti
  - coordinates: 49.45621°N 63.16591°W
  - elevation: 215 m (705 ft)
- Mouth: Gulf of Saint Lawrence
  - location: L'Île-d'Anticosti
  - coordinates: 49.27722°N 63.22611°W
  - elevation: 1 m (3.3 ft)
- Length: 17.0 km (10.6 mi)

Basin features
- Tributaries
  - left: (upstream) Four streams, discharge from a lake, two streams.
  - right: Two streams

The Galiote River (French: Rivière Galiote) is a tributary of the Gulf of Saint Lawrence, flowing in the municipality of L'Île-d'Anticosti, in the Minganie Regional County Municipality, in the administrative region of Côte-Nord, in province of Quebec, in Canada.

A forest road (north–south direction) serves the west side of the middle and lower part of this valley, connecting the Grand-Lac-Salé Ecological Reserve, and the main road passing through the center-north of the island.

Forestry is the main economic activity in this area; recreational tourism activities, second.

== Geography ==
The Galiote River originates from the confluence of two mountain streams (altitude: 215 m (705 ft)), located in the south-central part of the island. This source is located in a forest area at:

- 4.7 km (2.9 mi) west of Tour-Chicotte;
- 11.4 km (7.1 mi) south of Lake Wickenden;
- 94.7 km (58.8 mi) east of the town center of the village of Port-Menier;
- 33.1 km (20.6 mi) south of the north shore of Anticosti Island;
- 17.4 km (10.8 mi) northeast of the south shore of Anticosti Island.

From its source, the Galiote River flows on 17.0 km (10.6 mi) with a drop of 214 m (702 ft), according to the following segments:

- 4.9 m (16 ft) towards the south, collecting a stream (coming from the north-west), a second (coming from the north-east) and a third (coming from the west), up to a bend in the river, corresponding to a stream (coming from the west). Note: The place called Galiote-la-Chute is on the west bank of this bend in the river;
- 4.2 m (14 ft) eastward in a deep valley, to a bend in the river, corresponding to a stream (coming from the northeast). Note: The place called Galiote-la-Fourche is on the southwest bank of this bend in the river;
- 6.0 km (3.7 mi) towards the south in a deep valley, until the discharge (coming from the east) of two lakes;
- 1.9 km (1.2 mi) towards the south, passing under the forest road bridge that runs along the southern coast of Anticosti Island, to its mouth.

The Galiote river flows on the east side of Gand lac Salé, Petit lac Salé, Baie des Sables and Côte de la Grande Traversée, on the south shore of Anticosti Island, in the Gulf of Saint Lawrence. This confluence is located at:

- 9.1 km (5.7 mi) east of Pointe de la Tourbe;
- 14.6 km (9.1 mi) east of the mouth of the rivière du Brick;
- 9.4 km (5.8 mi) west of the mouth of the rivière aux Rats;
- 101.5 km (63.1 mi) east of the village center of Port-Menier.

== Toponymy ==
David Têtu, responsible for the surveillance of wrecked ships from 1870 to 1879, at the Pointe du Sud lighthouse, used “Galiote River” to designate this river on his map. According to the 17th Report of the Geographic Survey of Canada (1922), this watercourse has been designated according to several graphic variations: Galiote River, River Galiotte, Sabotte River and Galti River.

The term "galiote" refers to a sailing ship, with round shapes, used by Dutch navigators. Throughout history, the term "galiote" has also referred to a coaster and a fishing sailboat. However, the origin of the attribution of this toponymic designation remains unknown. It is reasonable to believe that this toponym evokes the shipwreck of a galiote not far from the mouth of this river.

Anticosti Island is nicknamed the “Gulf Cemetery” because more than 400 shipwrecks have been recorded since the island was donated as a fief and seigneury to Louis Jolliet in 1680. On the one hand, this statistic further supports the hypothesis of the origin of the name of the Galiote river. In addition, similar toponyms of the waterways of Anticosti Island, such as Havre du Brick and Pointe à la Goélette, evoke shipwrecks. In 1959, the Commission de géographie du Québec retained the toponymic designation “Rivière Galiote”.

The toponym “rivière Galiote” was made official on December 5, 1968, at the Place Names Bank of the Commission de toponymie du Québec.

== Lac-Salé Ecological Reserve ==
In 1991, the Quebec government established the "Lac-Salé Ecological Reserve" covering approximately 7000 hectares. Briefly, this reserve was delimited by the middle of the rivière du Brick from its confluence with the Honguedo Strait, going up the river to latitude 5,468,000 m N; thence, easterly, to the center of the Galiote river; then south following the center of the latter river, until its confluence with the Honguedo Strait.

== Recreational tourism activities ==
Between kilometers 7 and 11, the Galiote river offers a wild setting with little steep edges. The stony plateau allows walking there if the water is low as if it is an unmarked path on the bottom of the river. In the surroundings, walkers often see hares and deer. The flora of this area includes many rare species.

== See also ==
- Minganie Regional County Municipality
- L'Île-d'Anticosti, a Municipality
- Anticosti Island, an island
- Honguedo Strait
- Gulf of Saint Lawrence
- List of rivers of Quebec
