= De Vriendt =

De Vriendt or de Vriendt is a Dutch-language surname. People with this surname include:

- Albrecht De Vriendt (1843–1900), a Belgian painter
- Cornelis Floris de Vriendt (1514–1575), a Flemish sculptor, print artist and architect
- Frans Floris de Vriendt (1517–1 October 1570), a Flemish painter
- Jan Frans De Vriendt (1829–1919), a Belgian sculptor
- Maximiliaan de Vriendt, (1559–1614), a Neo-Latin poet and a civic office-holder in the city of Ghent
- Wouter De Vriendt, (born 1977), a Belgian politician
