= Rivière du Brick =

Location
- Country: Canada
- Province: Quebec
- Region: Côte-Nord
- Regional County Municipality: Minganie Regional County Municipality

Physical characteristics
- Source: Confluence of two mountain streams
  - location: L'Île-d'Anticosti
  - coordinates: 49.51050°N 63.32301°W
  - elevation: 239 m (784 ft)
- Mouth: Gulf of Saint Lawrence
  - location: L'Île-d'Anticosti
  - coordinates: 49.3725°N 63.49333°W
  - elevation: 1 m (3.3 ft)
- Length: 27.0 km (16.8 mi)

Basin features
- Tributaries
  - left: 11 streams
  - right: 14 streams

The Brick River (French: Rivière du Brick) is a tributary of the Gulf of Saint Lawrence, flowing in the municipality of L'Île-d'Anticosti, in the Minganie Regional County Municipality, in the administrative region of Côte-Nord, in province of Quebec, in Canada.

A forest road (north–south direction) serves the west side of this valley, connecting the Pointe-Sud-Ouest of the island, via the place called Tour-de-Jupiter (located on the watershed) and the main road passing on the northern slope of the island. A branch of this road descends towards the south-east to join the forest road which runs along the southern coast of the island.

Forestry is the main economic activity in this area; recreational tourism activities, second.

== Geography ==
The Brick River has its source at the confluence of two mountain streams (altitude: 239 m (784 ft)), located in the center of the island. This source is located in a forest area at:

- 81.8 km (50.8 mi) east of the town center of the village of Port-Menier;
- 32.6 km (20.3 mi) south of the north shore of Anticosti Island;
- 18.7 km (11.6 mi) northeast of the south shore of Anticosti Island.

From its source, the Brick River flows on 27.0 km (16.8 mi) with a drop of 238 m (781 ft), according to the following segments:

- 9.3 m (31 ft) towards the south in an increasingly deep valley, collecting many mountain streams (on the east side of the river), then mid-segment, forming a large curve towards west to go around a mountain, to the discharge (coming from the northeast) of a stream. Note: The confluence of this stream corresponds to the locality "Satellite";
- 9.0 km (5.6 mi) towards the south in a deep valley, forming a large curve towards the southwest and showing a strong drop, until a bend in the river corresponding to the discharge of a stream ( coming from the north) and a stream (coming from the west);
- 8.7 km (5.4 mi) first to the south in a steep valley with a good drop, curving east to go around a mountain, then south, passing under the forest road bridge which runs along the southern coast of the island, and collecting a stream (coming from the northeast) crossing a marsh area, up to its mouth.

The Brick River flows on the east side of the Jumpers Reefs on the south shore of Anticosti Island, in the Gulf of Saint Lawrence, or at 15.5 km (9.6 mi) at the east of Pointe-Sud-Ouest, 21.4 km (13.3 mi) southeast of the mouth of the Jupiter River and 86.9 km (54.0 mi) to the southeast from the center of the village of Port-Menier.

== Toponymy ==
This toponymic designation has been in use since the beginning of XXth Century. It originates from a two-masted sailboat generally referred to as brig, having been wrecked in this area.

The toponym "Brick River" was made official on December 5, 1968, at the Place Names Bank of the Commission de toponymie du Québec.

== Lac-Salé Ecological Reserve ==
In 1991, the Quebec government established the "Lac-Salé Ecological Reserve" covering approximately 7000 hectares. Briefly, this reserve was delimited by the middle of the Brick river from its confluence with the Honguedo Strait, going up the river to latitude 5,468,000 m N; thence, easterly, to the center of the Galiote river; then south following the center of the Galiote River, to its confluence with the Straits of Honguedo.

== Recreational tourism activities ==
The Brick canyon is one of the tourist attractions of Anticosti Island with its walls reaching 75 m (246 ft) in height. In Brick-la-Roche, at km 6 of the Brick River, the canyon offers a panorama with its plateau and scree slopes. This area is home to a diverse flora. The course of this river has emerald water basins ideal for swimming.

Hikers can learn about geology thanks to the fossils observed on the rock faces. They can also walk in the water on the stony bottom of the river.

In 2000, the Satellite pavilion was moved by SÉPAQ Anticosti to the mouth of the Brick River to better accommodate nature lovers.

=== Sport fishing with salmon ===
The Brick River no longer has the status of a salmon river under the Quebec Fishing Regulations since 1993.

The Brick river is frequented by sea trout, no longer by salmon.

=== Hunting ===
In 1983, the Ministère du Loisir, de la Chasse et de la Pêche introduced camping hunting at the Brick River. At the time, this addition increased the reception capacity on Anticosti Island; the rest of the offer was administered by outfitters.

== See also ==
- List of rivers of Quebec
