= Georges Maigret =

Augustinian provincial superior and theologian

Georges Maigret (1573–1633) was an Augustinian provincial superior and theologian in the Spanish Netherlands and the Prince-Bishopric of Liège (now Belgium).

== Life ==
Maigret was born in Bouillon in 1573. Aged 17, he joined the Augustinian Order. He was sent to Leuven University to study philosophy and theology, graduating Doctor of Sacred Theology on 17 November 1604. He served as prior of the Augustinian house at Tournai, and later in Liège, where he was the successor to Jean-Baptiste de Glen. He obtained permission from Ferdinand of Bavaria to establish an Augustinian house at Huy, where he also founded a college that existed until 1790. At a chapter held in Enghien on 15 April 1622, he was elected Provincial of the Low-German Province of his order. he would preside at four chapters of the province. In 1624, he became prior in Huy, where he died on 15 May 1633. He was buried in the Church of St George in Huy. He was remembered as a learned man who had great ability and prudence in directing those under obedience to him.

== Publications ==
- Noviciat, ou compas journalier de la vie monastique, comprenant brefvement en forme de dialogues, ce à quoy toutes personnes Religieuses tant hommes que femmes se doibvent occuper tout le long de la journee (Douai, Jean Bogard, 1602)
- Le Trésor ou Coffret honoraire de Jésus-Christ et des Saints, auquel est déclarée l'institution et excellence de la confrérie de la Ceinture de Saint-Augustin (Douai, 1604; reprinted Liège, 1611; Antwerp, 1628)
- Petit ray ou atome de la splendeur monastique, Auquel est exhibé l’eschantillon des grands fruicts que recueillent les fidels par la bienvenuë & ioyeuse entree des bons Religieux dans leurs Villes (Douai, Balthazar Bellerus, 1608)
- La Vie du bienheureux Jean de Sagahun, de l'ordre des Frères Ermites de Saint-Augustin, canonisé par notre S. P. le pape Clément VIII (Tournai, 1610)
  - Latin translation by Nicaise Bax as Vita Joannis Sagahuntini (Antwerp, Hieronymus Verdussen, 1625)
- Brieves relations des progrès de l'Evangile au royaume des Perses en la conversion des Mores, item les grandes conquestes du grand roy de Perse sur noz communs ennemis les Turcs (Liège, Christian Ouwerx, 1610)
- Rejetions sacrés, pullulants de la Palme triomphante des premiers martyrs de l'ordre, dit des Frères Eremites de Saint-Augustin (Liège, Christian Ouwerx, 1612)
  - Latin translation as Iconographia Martyrum ordinis Eremitarum S. Augustini (Antwerp, 1615)
- Les Larmes ou Gémissement de l'héraclite chrestien, ressuscité miraculeusement de l'enfer, et baptisé, pour apprendre à un chascun l'art de déplorer sa misère, selon l'un et l'autre hommes (Liège, 1613)
- Augustine Pyctacium provincia Mandria, seu Germania inferioris (Brussels, Hubert Anthoon, 1625)
- Litania Augustiniana (Leuven, Gerard Rivius, 1625)
- Abrégé de la vie de saint Thomas de Ville-Neuve, archevesque de Valence, de l'ordre des Frères Ermites de Saint-Augustin (Liège, 1626)
- La Vie de Saincte Elizabeth, royne de Portugal; avec les cérémonies faictes à Rome en sa canonization (Liège, 1626)
- Oraison funèbre de Madame Josine l'Aumosnière, comtesse de la Marck, etc., espouse de Monseigneur le comte de Rochefort (Liège, 1627)
- Tractates brevis, quo clare ostenditur religiosos mendicantes ad alium ordinem, etiam strictiorem, transire non posse (excepte solo Carthusianorum) absque speciali summi pontificis licentia (Liège, 1630)
