= Pavillon River =

Rivière du Pavillon

Location
- Country: Canada
- Province: Quebec
- Region: Côte-Nord
- Regional County Municipality: Minganie Regional County Municipality

Physical characteristics
- Source: Mountain stream
  - location: L'Île-d'Anticosti
  - coordinates: 49.37129°N 62.88408°W
  - elevation: 253 m (830 ft)
- Mouth: Gulf of Saint Lawrence
  - location: L'Île-d'Anticosti
  - coordinates: 49.19°N 62.90667°W
  - elevation: 1 m (3.3 ft)
- Length: 25.3 km (15.7 mi)

Basin features
- Tributaries
  - left: (upstream) Two streams, Pavillon East River
  - right: Three streams.

The rivière du Pavillon (English: Pavillon River) is a tributary of the Gulf of Saint Lawrence, flowing in the municipality of L'Île-d'Anticosti, in the Minganie Regional County Municipality, in the administrative region of Côte-Nord, in province of Quebec, in Canada.

The upper part of this valley is served by a network of forest roads for the needs of forestry and recreational tourism activities. A road (east–west direction) joins the intermediate part; another road the east side of the lower part.

== Geography ==
The Pavillon river draws its source from a small lake (altitude: 253 m (830 ft)), located in the south-central part of the island. This lake located on the watershed has two outlets: one towards the west constituting the head of the Vauréal River; the other to the south constituting the head of the Pavillon river. This source is located in a forest area at:

- 20.4 km (12.7 mi) north of the south shore of Anticosti Island;
- 33.0 km (20.5 mi) south of the north shore of Anticosti Island;
- 117.3 km (72.9 mi) east of the town center of the village of Port-Menier.

From its source, the Rivière du Pavillon descends between the rivière aux Plats (located on the west side) and the Ferrée River (east side). The Pavillon River generally flows south over 25.3 km (15.7 mi), with a drop of 252 m (827 ft), according to the following segments:

- 17.0 km (10.6 mi) towards the south-east, crossing the forest road, to the confluence of the Pavillon East River (coming from the north);
- 8.3 km (5.2 mi) towards the south in a coastal plain, collecting two streams (coming from the northeast), to its mouth

The Pavillon River empties on the south shore of Anticosti Island, in the Gulf of Saint Lawrence, on the east side of Cap des Caps. This confluence is located 8.0 km (5.0 mi) east of the mouth of the rivière aux Plats, at 14.5 km (9.0 mi) east of the mouth from the Ferrée River and at 125.8 km (78.2 mi) east of the center of the village of Port-Menier.

== Toponymy ==
This toponymic designation appeared in 1925 in the Dictionary of Rivers and Lakes of the Province of Quebec. This toponym also appears in a volume published in 1904 and in 1924, in the Bulletin de la Société de géographie de Québec.

The toponym "rivière du Pavillon" was made official on December 5, 1968.

== See also ==
- Honguedo Strait
- List of rivers of Quebec
