= Jupiter River =

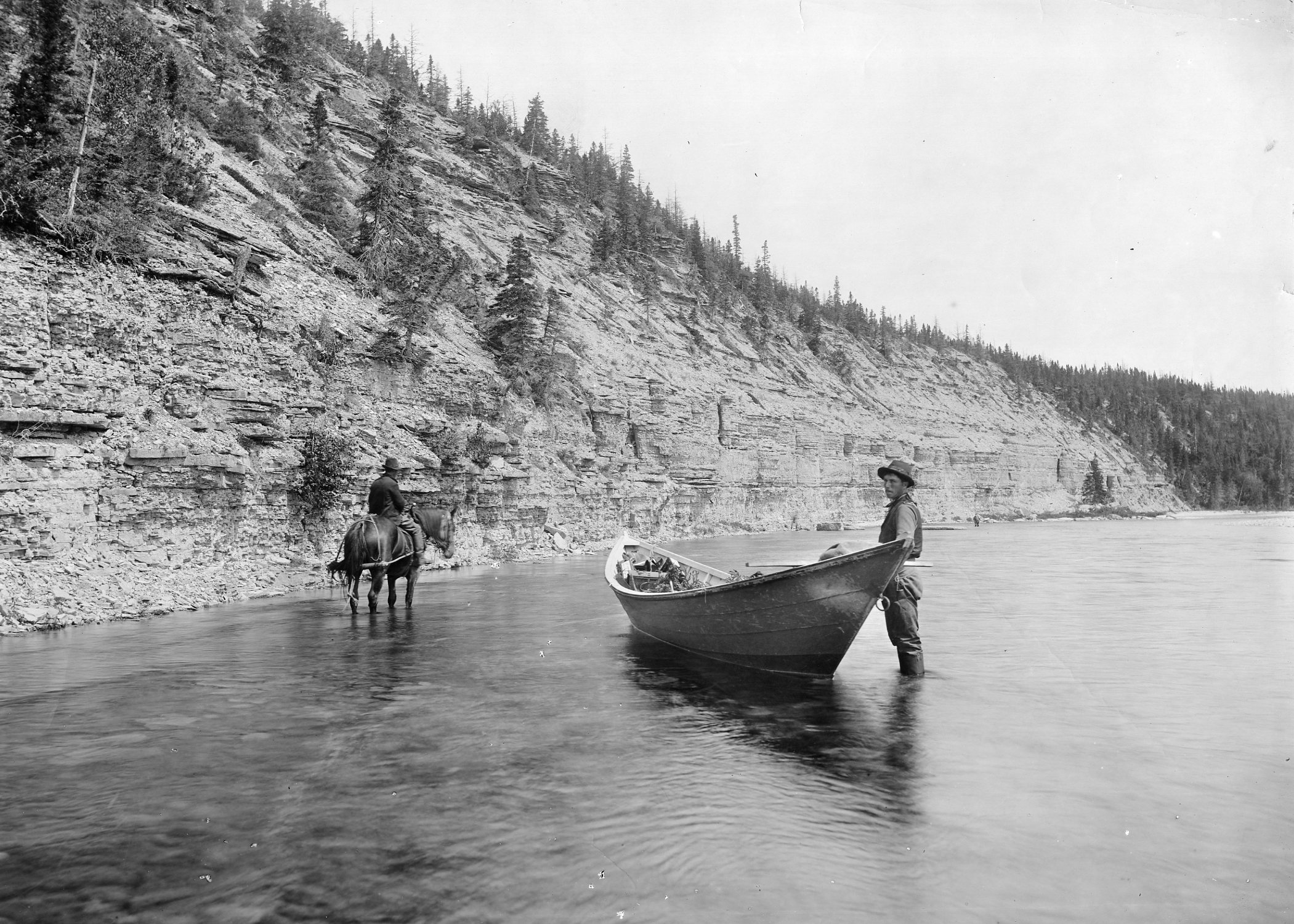

- Location within Quebec

Location
- Country: Canada
- Province: Quebec
- Region: Côte-Nord
- RCM: Minganie
- Island: Anticosti Island

Physical characteristics
- Source: Létourneau Lake
  - location: L'Île-d'Anticosti
  - coordinates: 49.48138°N 62.92381°W
  - elevation: 189 m (620 ft)
- Mouth: Gulf of Saint Lawrence
  - location: L'Île-d'Anticosti
  - coordinates: 49.47611°N 63.59361°W
  - elevation: 1 metre (3 ft 3 in)
- Length: 82.4 km (51.2 mi)

Basin features
- Tributaries
  - left: (upstream) Trois Milles stream, Brise-Culotte stream, 3 streams, Jean-IV stream.
  - right: (upstream) Five streams, Cheval stream, Smith lake outlet, Wickenden lake outlet, stream (via Lake Louise).

The rivière Jupiter is a watercourse flowing into Gulf of St. Lawrence, flowing in the municipality of L'Île-d'Anticosti, in the Minganie Regional County Municipality, in the administrative region of North Shore, in province of Quebec, in Canada.

The Jupiter River is the most important waterway on Anticosti Island. This river has tourist attractions, in particular sport fishing for salmon, its striking landscapes in particular its canyon comprising a cliff reaching in places up to 100 m (330 ft) in height, the presence of thousands of deer and seals along the shores.

A forest road serves the lower part of the valley of this river, connecting to the main road which pass in the northern part of the island. This road joins Pointe de Marbre (area of the Rivière à la Chute) and Pointe Sud-Ouest, which face the Honguedo Strait. In addition, another road (north–south direction) serves the upper part of this valley, thus joining the western part of Anticosti national park. Forestry is the main economic activity in this area; recreational tourism activities, second.

== Geography ==
The Jupiter River draws its source from Lake Létourneau (length: 2.4 km (1.5 mi); altitude: 189 m (620 ft)), located in the center of the island. This zone includes a series of lakes and ponds including Girard, Simard and Grégoire ponds. This source is located on the west side of the course of the Vauréal River. This river is fed by ten tributaries. The flow of this river is moderate upstream and rapid downstream.

This source is located at:

- 112.8 km (70.1 mi) east of the town center of the village of Port-Menier;
- 24.8 km (15.4 mi) south of the north shore of Anticosti Island;
- 30.4 km (18.9 mi) northeast of the south shore of Anticosti Island.

From its source, the Jupiter River flows on 82.4 km (51.2 mi) with a drop of 188 m (617 ft), according to the following segments:

- 13.9 km (8.6 mi) first towards the west, in particular by successively crossing Godin, Simard and Louise lakes (altitude: 190 m (620 ft)), until the discharge (coming from the north) of lakes Wickenden and Wilcox. Note: The beginning of this segment (up to Lake Louise) constitutes the boundary between SÉPAQ Anticosti and parc national d'Anticosti;
- 34.9 km (21.7 mi) towards the north-west, cutting the forest road and collecting the discharge (coming from the north-east) of Smith lake, up to a bend in the river;
- 13.1 km (8.1 mi) winding south-west, collecting the discharge (coming from the north) from the stream to the horse, up to a bend in the river;
- 20.5 km (12.7 mi) towards the south, collecting the discharge (coming from the east) of the Jean-IV stream and the discharge (coming from the northeast) of the Brise-Culotte stream; then to the south-west, collecting the discharge (coming from the south-east) of the Trois Milles stream, to its mouth. Note: This river widens at the end of the course to form sandy beaches.

The Jupiter River flows into Bonsecours Bay (length: 1.9 km (1.2 mi)) on the south shore of Anticosti Island, in the Gulf of St. Lawrence, or at 39.5 km (24.5 mi) from the western limit of SÉPAQ Anticosti and at 80 km (50 mi) east of the center of the village of Port-Menier. This bay is bounded by Cape Jupiter (north side) and Cape Ottawa (south side).

== Salmon sport fishing center ==
The course of the Jupiter River is a world class river with its 70 salmon pools, 30 of which are used for sport fishing. Tourists who enjoy sport fishing have frequented this river since around 1895. The Société des establishments de plein air du Québec (Sépaq), which is its mandated manager, has enhanced this valley by equipping it with chalets and services to receive many tourists and fishermen.

In the 19th century, this island was acquired by the businessman Henri Menier from France; he invested in the island to make it an ideal place for salmon fishing. The main camps set up along this Jupiter river for recreational tourism activities are designated Jupiter-Trente, Jupiter-Vingt-Quatre, Jupiter-Douze and Jupiter-la-Mer, according to their distance (in miles) from the shore of the Gulf of Saint-Laurent.

Its turquoise and crystalline waters of this river make the salmon visible from the surface. The bed of this river is mostly made up of pebbles and pebbles.

According to Saumon Québec, this river is home to about 30% of the potential habitats for the reproduction and growth of Atlantic salmon on Anticosti Island. In addition, this river is home to nearly 30% of adult salmon.

Many personalities from all over the world have come to tease the salmon on the course of this river. One of the first to fish sportily was its owner, the Frenchman Henri Meunier, in 1895.

== Toponymy ==
The Depot of the charts and plans of the Navy includes a chart deposited in 1758 relating to the Anticosti Island, and also a nautical chart dated 1784; these two maps indicate "Rivière de Bon Secours" and "R. de bon Secours or Jupiter's inlet ”. These maps describe the cove located at the mouth of the river. According to the Commission de toponymie du Québec, the toponymic designation of this inlet would be linked to the fact that a ship named Jupiter would have passed there, or else would have been wrecked there. Subsequently, the name of the cove extended to the stream.

In 1815, cartographer Joseph Bouchette made reference to Jupiter River on his map describing this area. High sand cliffs rise at the mouth of the river, that is to say to the north of Bonsecours bay; among its cliffs, Cape Jupiter also bears the same name and is also referred to as Sandy Cliff.

The toponym "Rivière Jupiter" was made official on December 5, 1968, at the Place Names Bank of the Commission de toponymie du Québec.

== See also ==
- Minganie Regional County Municipality
- L'Île-d'Anticosti, a Municipality
- Anticosti National Park
- Anticosti Island, an island
- Lake Wickenden
- Gulf of St. Lawrence
- List of rivers of Quebec
