= Oudegem =

- Village and former municipality
- Coat of arms
- Interactive map of Oudegem
- Coordinates: 51°00′33″N 4°03′41″E
- Country: Belgium
- Region: Flanders
- Province: East Flanders
- Municipality: Dendermonde

Area
  - Total: 7.17 km^{2} (2.77 sq mi)

Population (1 January 2020)
  - Total: 4,064
  - Density: 567/km^{2} (1,470/sq mi)
- Postal code: 9200

Oudegem is a village in the province of East Flanders, Belgium, and a sub-municipality of Dendermonde. It was an independent municipality until the municipal reorganization of 1977. The village lies in the Dender region, between the Dender river and the Scheldt.

== History ==
=== Etymology ===
The earliest recorded names of Oudegem include Aldengem (1019), Aldengienh (1144), and Audengien (1181). The name derives from the Germanic term aldinga haim, meaning “home of the descendants of Aldo,” with Aldo being a Frankish personal name.

=== Early history ===
Archaeological evidence suggests human activity in the region before the arrival of Germanic peoples. Pre-Roman burial mounds and Roman coins have been found nearby, and a Roman road once ran between Douai and Hulst, passing near Oudegem.

=== Middle Ages ===
During the Middle Ages, feudal rights in Oudegem were shared between the chapter of Cambrai and the lords of Dendermonde. Smaller lordships in the area were owned by the Affligem Abbey and Saint Bavo's Abbey. Archaeological evidence and place names suggest the presence of a castle or fortified site in the area known as Oudburg.

=== Early modern period ===
From 1607 until his death in 1636, the poet and priest Justus de Harduwijn served as pastor of Oudegem and Mespelare.

=== Modern period ===
In 1837, a railway line connecting Dendermonde and Ghent was constructed through the village. During the 19th century, a small chicory-processing factory was established in the area.

Oudegem remained an independent municipality until 1977, when it was merged into Dendermonde.

== Geography ==
Oudegem is situated between the Dender and the Scheldt. The terrain consists mainly of loamy and sandy soils, with an elevation ranging between 7 and 10 meters above sea level.

== Landmarks ==
- Onze-Lieve-Vrouw-Hemelvaartkerk
- Local war memorial
- Onze-Lieve-Vrouw van Lambroeckkapel
- Remains of the Stenenmolen windmill

== Economy ==
Oudegem is home to a paper manufacturing plant operated by VPK. In 2024, plans to expand the site with a new energy installation led to local protests due to concerns about expropriation of nearby homes.
