= Rivière aux Plats =

Location
- Country: Canada
- Province: Quebec
- Region: Côte-Nord
- Regional County Municipality: Minganie Regional County Municipality

Physical characteristics
- Source: Mountain stream
  - location: L'Île-d'Anticosti
  - coordinates: 49.39936°N 62.96450°W
  - elevation: 260 m (850 ft)
- Mouth: Gulf of Saint Lawrence
  - location: L'Île-d'Anticosti
  - coordinates: 49.21361°N 63.01°W
  - elevation: 1 m (3.3 ft)
- Length: 26.2 km (16.3 mi)

Basin features
- Tributaries
  - left: Three streams.
  - right: Three streams.

The rivière aux Plats (English: Flat River) is a tributary of the Gulf of St. Lawrence, flowing in the municipality of L'Île-d'Anticosti, in the Minganie Regional County Municipality, in the administrative region of North Shore, in province of Quebec, in Canada.

This valley is served by a network of forest roads for forestry and recreational tourism activities.

Forestry is the main economic activity in this area; recreational tourism activities, second.

== Geography ==
The Rivière aux Plats draws its source from a mountain stream (altitude: 260 m (850 ft)), located in the center-south of the island, just south of the forest road (east–west direction). This source is located in a forest area at:

- 2.7 km (1.7 mi) east of Lac Jolliet;
- 21.5 km (13.4 mi) north of the south shore of Anticosti Island;
- 31.9 km (19.8 mi) south of the north shore of Anticosti Island;
- 110.7 km (68.8 mi) east of the town center of the village of Port-Menier.

From its source, the Rivière aux Plats descends between the Chicotte River (located on the west side) and the Pavillon River (east side). The Rivière aux Plats generally flows south-east, then south, over 26.2 km (16.3 mi) with a drop of 259 m (850 ft), according to the following segments:

- 9.9 m (32 ft) first to the southeast, then to the south, to a bend in the river corresponding to a stream (coming from the west);
- 7.8 km (4.8 mi) first to the southeast, collecting two streams (coming from the north), until another stream (coming from the northeast);
- 8.5 km (5.3 mi) first to the south, collecting a stream (coming from the west), until its mouth.

The Rivière aux Plats drains into a small bay on the south shore of Anticosti Island, in the Gulf of St. Lawrence, on the west side of Cap des Caps. This confluence is located 8.0 km (5.0 mi) west of the mouth of the Pavillon River, 3.0 km (1.9 mi) east of the mouth from the Chicotte River and at 118.4 km (73.6 mi) east of the center of the village of Port-Menier.

== Toponymy ==
The toponym “rivière aux Plats” was made official on September 12, 1974.

== See also ==
- Honguedo Strait
- List of rivers of Quebec
