= Gerard Rivius =

Printer in the Southern Netherlands

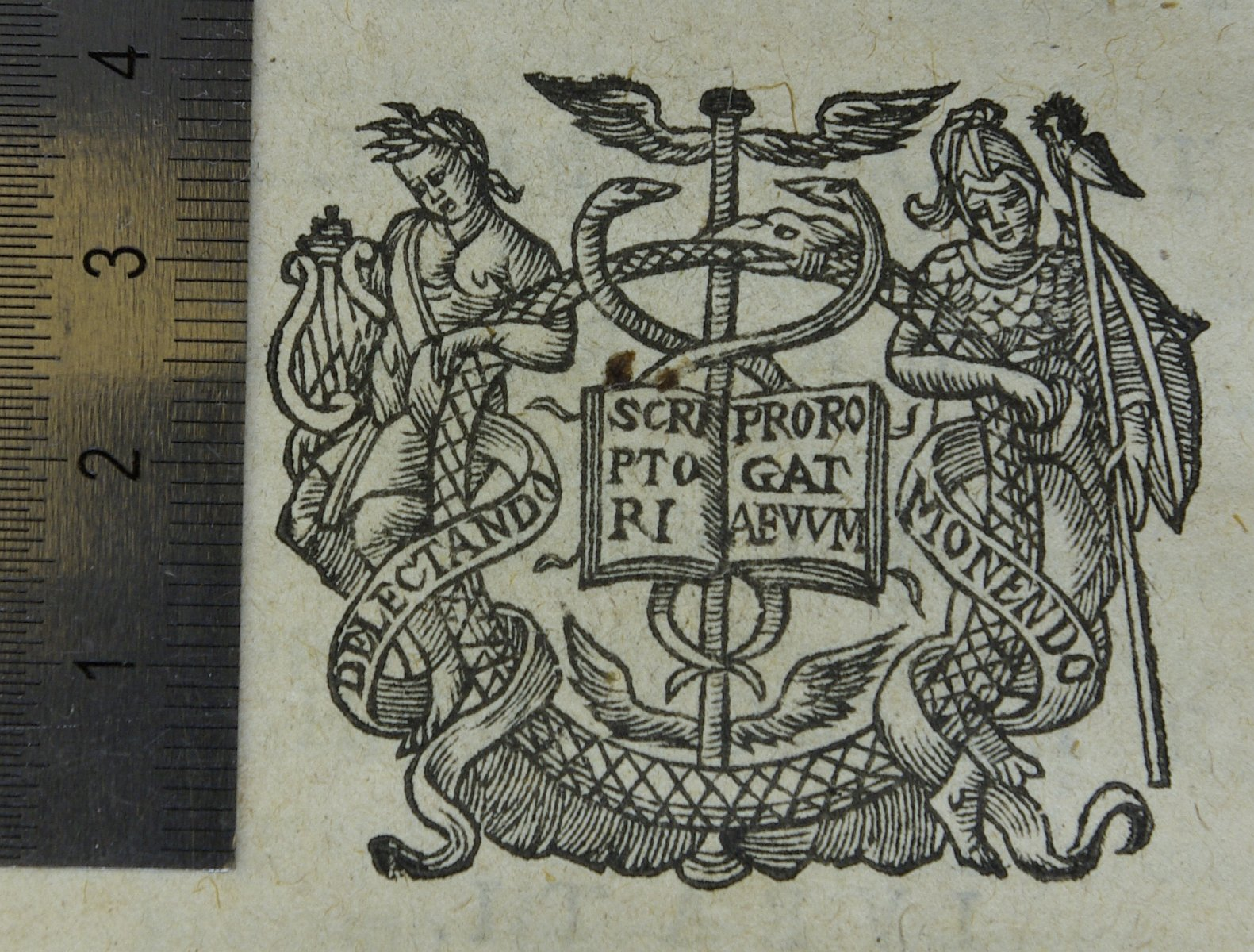
- Printer's device of Gerardus Rivius as used in Erycius Puteanus, Comvs, sive Phagesiposia cimmeria. Somnivm, 1608 (KU Leuven – Bijzondere collecties: CaaA2135)]]
- Occupation: printer
- Years active: 1592–1625
- Era: handpress
- Notable work: Martin Delrio, Disquistiones Magicae (1599-1600)

Gerard van Rivieren, Latinized Gerardus Rivius (active 1592–1625) was a printer in the Southern Netherlands. He was the publisher of Martin Delrio's famous witchcraft treatise Disquistiones Magicae and was at one time suspected of having printed Corona Regia, a satire on James I of England that caused diplomatic ructions. His printer's mark was a winged horse, and his motto "Totum sic irrigat orbem".

== Life ==
Rivius's earliest work was produced in Liège in 1592, where he continued to work until 1597. In 1598 he was using an Antwerp address, and from 1599 his shop was on the main market square in Leuven.

Rivius married Johanna Bogaers. Of their children Johannes Rivius (1599–1665) became an Augustinian canon and a lecturer at Leuven University, while Petrus Rivius (1607–1666) became a Premonstratensian canon of Tongerlo Abbey.

== Publications ==
- 1598: Cornelis van Wytfliet, Descriptionis Ptolemaicae Augmentum
- 1599: Matthaeus Galenus, Commentarius in Pauli ad Hebraeos epistolam
- 1599–1600: Martin Delrio, Disquistiones Magicae, 3 vols.
- 1604: Nicolas de Montmorency, Flos Campi
- 1605: Johannes Wamesius, Responsa sive consilia de jure pontificio
- 1614: Maximiliaan de Vriendt, Urbes Flandriæ et Brabantiæ
- 1620: Jacobus Jansenius, Oratio funebris in obitum D. Matthiae Hovii (a funeral oration for Mathias Hovius)
- 1625: Johannes Molanus, Theologiae practicae compendium
- 1625: Georges Maigret, Litania Augustiniana
