= Matthias Pauli =

Matthias Pauli (1580–1651), a member of the Order of Saint Augustine, was an educator, spiritual author and poet in the Habsburg Netherlands.

== Life ==
Pauli was born in Hasselt in 1580, and joined the Augustinians there at the age of 15. Sent to Leuven University to study theology, he became prefect of the Augustinian College established there in 1612. In 1622, Pauli was sent to Bruges to establish an Augustinian College there. At various times, Pauli served as prior of the Augustinian houses in Bruges, Leuven, Dendermonde and Maastricht. He died in Maastricht on 14 January 1651. Throughout his life, he was a prolific author.

== Writings ==
- Het bondelken van devotien inhoudende de seven cleyn ghetyden van den soeten name Jesus vande weerdighe moeder Anna (Ghent, Cornelis vander Meeren, 1615)
- Ghebeden ende meditatien op de ceremonien vande heylighe misse nae het Roomsch ghebruyck (Ghent, Cornelis vander Meeren, 1618; Antwerp, Guilliam van Tongheren, 1618)
- Den boom des levens voorts-brenghende tweelf schoone vruchten met seer devote meditatien van't hoochweerdich H. sacrament des autaers (Ghent, Cornelis vander Meeren, 1618; reprinted Antwerp, 1618, 1631; Leuven, 1631)
  - In Latin translation as Arbor vitae proferens fructus duodecim, sive Considerationes Eucharisticae (Ghent, Cornelis vander Meeren, 1626)
- Den chrijchs-riem oft Den spieghel vande wercken der christelijcker rechtveerdicheyt (Ghent, Cornelis vander Meeren, 1619)
- Vier historien van het H. sacrament van mirakel, rustende 1. in de abdije van Hercken-rode in t'landt van Luyck. 2. Ten augustijnen tot Gendt. 3. S. Goedelen tot Brussel. 4. Ten augustijnen tot Loven (Antwerp, Geeraerdt I van Wolsschaten, 1620)
- Den processionael voor de broederschappen van het hoochweerdich sacrament: verciert met veel schoone historien, ende mirakulen (Ghent, Cornelis vander Meeren, 1620)
- Manuel de la confrerie du glorieux patriarche S. Joseph (Ghent, Cornelis vander Meeren, 1621; reprinted 1623, 1625)
  - In Dutch translation as Handt-Boecxkin voor de Broederschap van den Glorieusen Patriarch S. Joseph (Ghent, Cornelis vander Meeren, 1624)
- De beclagingen Christi over de ondanckbaerheyt der ioden ende quade christenen sermoon-wys wtgheleyt bedeylt in twee stucken (Leuven, Hendrik van Hastens, 1624)
- Bruylofts-liedt van Jesus en Maria speel-wys gedicht op Salomons sangen (Leuven, Cornelis Coenesteyn, 1630)
- Den grooten gheestelycken sonne-wyser aenwijsende wt den lof der maechdelycke bien, den lof van een gheestelyck devoot ende volmaeckt leven (Ghent, Judocus Dooms, 1634)
- De poorte des hemels dat is de glorieuse maghet Maria, verciert met twelf costelijcke ghesteenten der wtghelesen deuchden (Antwerp, Willem Lesteens, 1634; reprinted Liège, 1635)
- Requeste oft Versoeck-brieven der aflijvighe geloovige christenen aen de levende geloovige christenen met d'apostille daer op gegeven (Liège, Léonard Streel, 1637)
- Vijf vriendelijcke t'samen-sprekinghen tusschen eenen Hollandschen minister ende eenen Roomschen catholijcken (Liège, Léonard Streel, 1637)
- Un abrégé contenant la vérité catholique du purgatoire (Liège, Léonard Streel, 1640)
- Sonderlinghen troost der geloovighe zielen (Liège, Léonard Streel, 1643)
