= Martin Delrio =

Jesuit theologian (1551–1608)

Martin Delrio SJ
- Born: 17 May 1551; Antwerp, Duchy of Brabant, Habsburg Netherlands
- Died: 19 October 1608 (aged 57); Leuven, Duchy of Brabant, Spanish Netherlands
- Known for: His six-volume work Magical Investigations
- Religion: Roman Catholicism
- Ordained: 1589

Martin Anton Delrio SJ (Latin: Martinus Antonius Delrio; Spanish: Martín Antonio del Río; French: Martin-Antoine del Rio; 17 May 1551 – 19 October 1608) was a Dutch Jesuit theologian. He studied at numerous institutions, receiving a master's degree in law from Salamanca in 1574. After a period of political service in the Spanish Netherlands, he became a Jesuit in 1580.

He studied or taught at Jesuit colleges across Catholic Europe, including Bordeaux, Douai, Graz, Mainz, Leuven, and Salamanca. He was the friend of the Flemish humanist Justus Lipsius, a relative of Michel de Montaigne, and an enemy of the Protestant scholar Joseph Scaliger. He was the author of a large number of books, including classical commentaries and works of biblical exegesis. He remains, however, best known for his six-volume Magical Investigations (1599–1600), a work on magic, superstition, and witchcraft.

== Life ==
=== Early life ===
Martin Delrio was born in Antwerp on 17 May 1551, Whit Sunday, to the Spanish merchant Antonio del Río (d. 17 February 1586) and his wife Eleonora López de Villanova (d. 21 April 1602). The Del Río family were part of a sizeable Spanish community in Antwerp, more than 200 merchants were active in Antwerp in 1540. Young Martin studied at a Latin school in nearby Lier and soon revealed himself as a childhood prodigy. He matriculated at the Old University of Leuven on 1 December 1563, at the age of 12.

There he studied under the humanist Cornelius Valerius and met a number of other young promising scholars, including Andreas Schott, Willem Canter, and Justus Lipsius. In middle age, their friendship would significantly change the course of both their lives. Delrio's first publication, an edition of the late Roman grammarian Gaius Iulius Solinus, was based on a manuscript borrowed from Lipsius and included suggested emendations by his tutor Valerius. Delrio also published an edition of Claudian. He was particularly proud of the edition of Senecan tragedy, published in 1576 but which he (falsely) claimed to have completed before his twentieth birthday.

His travels during his peregrinatio academica are difficult to follow. He can be placed at the University of Paris in 1567 and 1568. He also spent some time in Douai where he refused to share a bed with an unnamed famous man (cited by his 1609 Jesuit hagiography as proof of his chastity). In 1572 he matriculated at the University of Salamanca on 1 December 1572 and graduated two years later. At Salamanca he would see ‘the remnant of an evil gymnasium’ where Muslims had allegedly taught magic.

=== Political career ===
Martin Delrio was never destined for one of the religious orders. His family had originally destined him for a political career. His law degree from Salamanca was part of this requirement. The Spanish crown since the days of Catholic Monarchs had particularly valued such degrees. Equally valued were titles of nobility. A legacy left by Martin's grandfather was used to buy him the title of Lord of Aartselaar. On 7 September 1561, at the age of 10, Martin Delrio made his official entry, swearing an oath in which he promised to protect widows and orphans. The Delrio family also paid host to a number of prominent figures on visits to Antwerp, including Antoine Perrenot de Granvelle and Anne of Austria, Queen of Spain, Philip II's fourth wife.

With the onset of the Dutch Revolt members of the family found employment with the Council of Troubles, the repressive institution set up by the new governor-general Fernando Álvarez de Toledo, 3rd Duke of Alba. A cousin, Luís del Río, was one of the councillors. Martin's father Antonio later became treasurer-general of confiscations, in charge of seizing assets. Martin himself would after his return from Spain (sometime in 1576 or early 1577) follow suit. The new governor-general Don John of Austria first made peace and then broke it. Soon after, on 29 October 1577, Don John appointed Martin to the Council of Brabant. Credentials or qualifications were irrelevant; with the exception of one loyalist member who fled to Paris, none of the existing councillors had decided to follow Don John.

Despite Martin's appointment and rapid promotion (he would be made vice-chancellor of Brabant in July 1578), these were tragic years for the Delrio family. Luís was arrested by the rebels, later released but soon died. Martin's father Antonio evaded capture and died a penniless exile in Lisbon. Martin's career also faltered. After the death of Don John, the new governor-general Alexander Farnese, Duke of Parma changed course, embarking on a campaign reconciliation. Little attention was paid to those whose loyalty could be taken for granted. Martin seems to have lost his position as vice-chancellor. Another victim seems to have been the memoirs which Delrio composed in honour of his patron Don John of Austria and in ostensible imitation of Caesar's De Bello Gallico. These remained unpublished until the late nineteenth century.

=== Jesuit career ===
On 27 December 1579 Martin Delrio wrote from Maastricht to the Jesuit General Everard Mercurian seeking to join the Society of Jesus. Delrio professed a sincere conversion to the religious life, but with his career side-lined and his family connections either dead or in exile he might also have had little choice. At the same time his close personal involvement as well as his family's role in the Dutch Revolt also meant that Martin could only ever see the conflict in religious terms. Not waiting for a reply he headed for Spain entering the Society of Jesus on 9 May 1580.

This by no means put an end to his itinerant existence. When, in 1584, it was decided that he should return to the Low Countries for mission work, he stopped in Bordeaux and stayed there for two years. Whether he met Bordeaux's mayor, the famous essayist Michel de Montaigne, while there, is unclear, but the two men were second cousins on their maternal side. It is at this time that Delrio began work on his first publication since his entry in the Society, a substantially revised and expanded version of his edition of Senecan Tragedy. The Syntagma tragoediae latinae (finally published in 1593–94) was at once a renunciation of secular (classical) interests and an acknowledgement of the seminal role the classics played in Jesuit education.

His travels after 1586 are relatively unclear. In 1587, he was in Mainz, in 1589 in Leuven and Douai, and in 1591–1593 in Liège. At last in 1594 he obtained the position of professor of biblical exegesis at the Jesuit college of Leuven. He would teach (and later publish on) the Old Testament Song of Songs and the Book of Lamentations. (His successor in that chair would be Cornelius a Lapide, possibly the most famous exegete of the Counter-Reformation.) During these years he also gave a number of sermons in honour of the Virgin Mary, which he collected and published under the title Florida Mariana (Marian Blossoms, 1598).

In Leuven he also reunited with his university friend Justus Lipsius, who credited Delrio as the "author of his conversion". Although this vastly overstates the Jesuit's actual role, it did lead to their names and reputations coming forever intertwined. Lipsius, one of the leading humanists of his day, had spent thirteen years teaching in Protestant Leiden and was a bone both Catholics and Protestants fought over. Delrio, whose orthodoxy was never in doubt, posthumously became Lipsius's guarantor.

The founder of the Jesuits, Ignatius of Loyola had wanted obedience to be the Society's hallmark. Its Constitutions likened the individual Jesuit to "a lifeless body". Delrio's time in Leuven, however, was almost as turbulent as his time in Bordeaux, when he refused to return to the Low Countries. In letters to the Jesuit General in Rome, Claudio Acquaviva, he denounced first the rector of the college and later the provincial hierarchy.

This led the Jesuit to be shipped to Graz in Austria, close to the frontier with the Ottoman Empire. Here he impressed the ultra-orthodox Archduke Ferdinand (who as Ferdinand II would plunge the Holy Roman Empire into the Thirty Years' War). After Delrio's departure for Spain Ferdinand would insistently call for his return.

Delrio had never wanted to leave Spain. When in Leuven he actively lobbied to be returned there, he was sent to Graz instead. In 1604, the Long Turkish War at last provided an excuse for travel to Spain. Delrio spent some time teaching at Valladolid and Salamanca, where he despaired of the quality of the students, describing them as "students for our saliva". In the autumn of 1607 Delrio petitioned Rome to be allowed to return to the Low Countries, which was granted. He left Valladolid on 18 August. On 19 October 1608, three days after his return to Leuven, Delrio died, the final stop for a person who could apparently not find peace anywhere.

== Work ==
Martin Delrio's Magical Investigations (Latin: Disquisitiones Magicae or Disquisitionum Magicarum Libri Sex) first appeared in three volumes in Leuven in 1599 and 1600, printed by Gerard Rivius. It was still reprinted in Cologne in 1720 and 1755 and in Venice in 1746. Historians have traditionally regarded the work as only a receptacle of the ideas of the Malleus Maleficarum ("Hammer of the Witches", 1486).

Delrio was credited with importing the beliefs of the Malleus into the Low Countries. Hugh Trevor-Roper, for instance, described the book as the "new Catholic Malleus" and claimed that "[i]t was the Catholic reconquest which introduced witch-burning into Flanders, and the Jesuit del Rio who would keep it up", holding the Jesuit directly responsible for the burnings.

Historians have also believed that the work was based on practical experience. Wolfgang Behringer argued that Delrio drew on his experience as a young magistrate, which made him in effect "a colleague of Nicolas Remy". However, it is now recognized that Delrio's personal experience with witchcraft was really rather limited and that he may never have met an alleged witch.

The Investigations was—in keeping with Delrio's other publications—a work of textual scholarship. It was based on Delrio's knowledge of the classics and familiarity with Church history. Hagiography forms a particular source of inspiration. (Delrio's student Heribert Rosweyde would play an important role in the emergence of the Acta Sanctorum, a Catholic encyclopedia of saints lives.) Delrio also drew on histories of other countries and continents, as well as Jesuit reports from the New World. The textual foundation of the work made it difficult to critique and to replace.

In contrast to works by Henry Boguet and Pierre de Lancre, Delrio's was not based on personal experience. His credibility could less easily be called into question. It has, however, been suggested that, divorced from the real world, as a result its relevance for witchcraft persecutions was rather limited. Sceptics seized on the work's more moderate comments, to Delrio's annoyance. A translation into English began appearing in 2000, making the work accessible to a wider audience.

== Publications ==
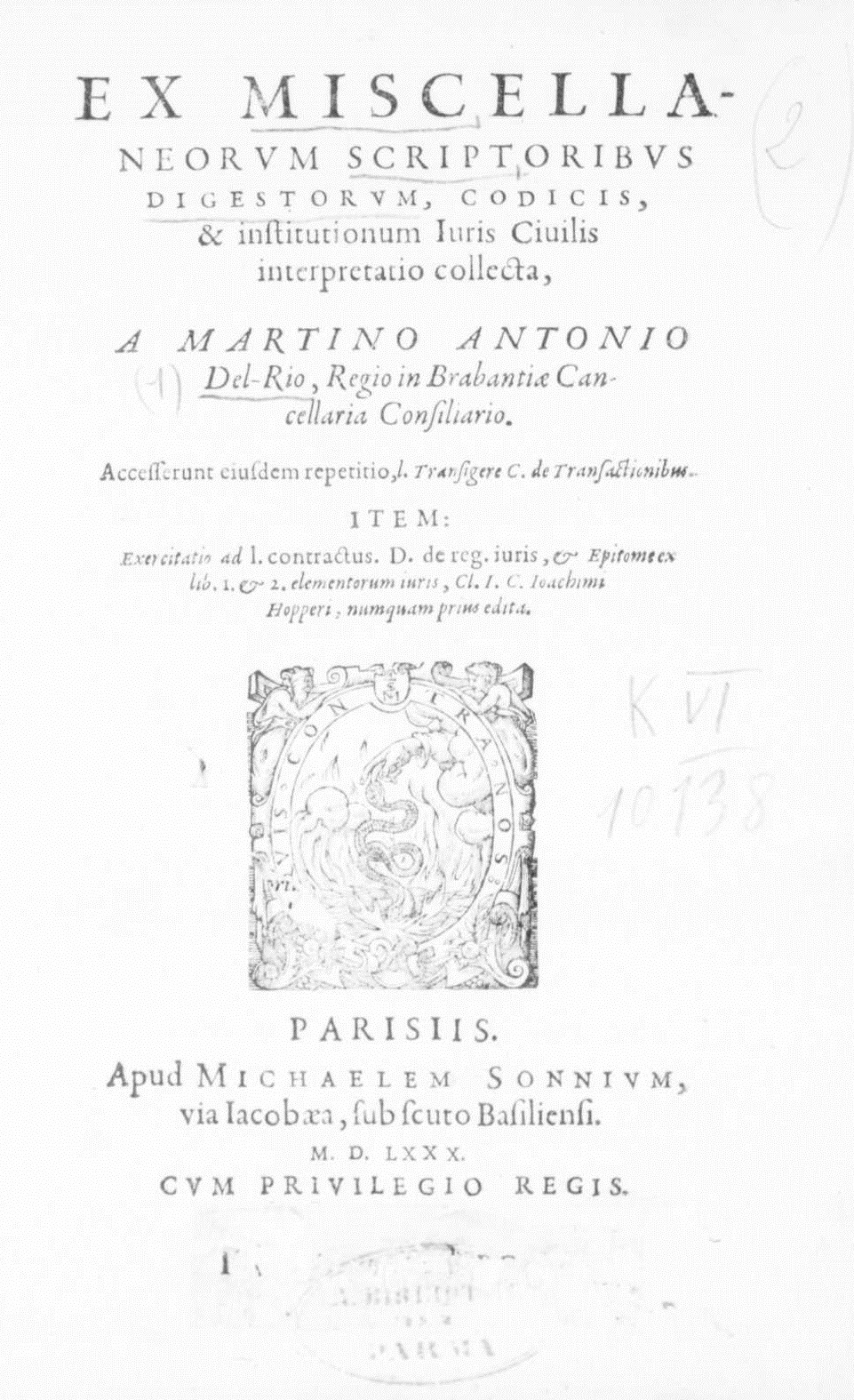
Ex miscellaneorum scriptoribus digestorum, codicis et institutionum iuris civilis interpretatio, 1580

- Gaius Julius Solinus (1572). Martin Delrio (ed.). Polyhistor a Martino-Antonio Delrio emendatus. Antuerpiae: ex officina Christophori Plantini Architypographi Regii.
- Martin Delrio (1576). In Senecae Tragoedias decem commentarii Martini Ant. Del Rio. Antuerpiae: ex officina Christophori Plantini Architypographi Regii.
- Martin Antonio Del Rio (1580). Ex miscellaneorum scriptoribus digestorum, codicis et institutionum iuris civilis interpretatio (in Latin). Paris: Michel Sonnius.
- Martin Delrio (1593). Martini Antonii Delrii ex Societate Iesu Syntagma tragoediae latinae: in tres partes distinctum. Antuerpiae: ex officina Plantiniana, apud Viduam, & Ioannem Moretum.
- Martin Delrio (1596). Ad Cl. Claudiani V. C. Opera Martini Antonii Del-Rio Notae. Antuerpiae: ex Officina Plantiniana.
- Martino Del Rio (1599). Disquisitionum magicarum (in Latin). Vol. 6. Louvain: G. Rivius.
- Vindiciae areopagiticae Martini Del Rio contra Josephum Scaligerum (in Latin). Antuerpiae: ex officina Plantiniana, apud Ioannem Moretum. 1607.

== Notes ==
=== References ===
- Machielsen, Jan (2015). Martin Delrio: Demonology and Scholarship in the Counter-Reformation. Oxford: Oxford University Press. ISBN 978-0-19-726580-2.
