= Cornelis vander Meeren =

Cornelis vander Meeren or Cornelius Marius (active 1610–1626) was a printer and bookseller in the city of Ghent in the Habsburg Netherlands. He was also a translator from French to Dutch, and may have been the father of the Leonard Marius. He printed at the address "Inden Soeten naem Iesvs" (the Sweet Name of Jesus), near the Church of St Pharaildis, and his surviving output is almost exclusively religious writings by members of the Augustinian, Benedicine, and Jesuit Orders. His printer's mark depicted a woman seated between a harp and a lute, holding a wreath in either hand, with mountains visible in the background.

== Publications ==
1610

- Maximiliaan de Vriendt, Panegyricus in adventum Rmi. D. Caroli Masii quarti Gandensium Episcopi

1612

- Jan van Paesschen, Een devote maniere om gheestelijcke Pelgrimagie te trecken tot den heylighen Lande

1614

- Henri Lancelotz, Viticula Mariana viginti pampinis mysticis
- Henri Lancelotz, Haereticum Quare per Catholicum Quia (reprinted 1615; 1619)

1615

- Josse De Rycke, Panegyricus heroïca sacro honori et purpurae Scipionis Cobellutti S. R.. E. Cardinalis creati
- Matthias Pauli, Het bondelken van devotien inhoudende de seven cleyn ghetyden van den soeten name Jesus vande weerdighe moeder Anna (reprinted 1625)
- Jacobus Cornelius Lummenaeus à Marca, Bustum Sodomae tragoedia sacra

1617

- Josse De Rycke, De Capitolio Romano Commentarius
- Jacobus Cornelius Lummenaeus à Marca, Amnon tragoedia sacra
- Jacobus Cornelius Lummenaeus à Marca, Pleias Sacra sive VII Homiliae Sacrae
- Wilhelmus Oonselius, Consolatorium animae hinc migrantis

1618

- Matthias Pauli, Ghebeden ende meditatien op de ceremonien vande heylighe misse nae het Roomsch ghebruyck
- Matthias Pauli, Den boom des levens voorts-brenghende tweelf schoone vruchten met seer devote meditatien van't hoochweerdich H. sacrament des autaers
- Jacobus Cornelius Lummenaeus à Marca, Corona Virginea, sive Stellae Duodecum, id est, Duodecim Homiliae Sacrae

1619

- Matthias Pauli, Den chrijchs-riem oft Den spieghel vande wercken der christelijcker rechtveerdicheyt

1620

- Matthias Pauli, Den processionael voor de broederschappen van het hoochweerdich sacrament: verciert met veel schoone historien, ende mirakulen

1621

- Gillis de Coster, Kalengier ende Lust-Hof der H. Kercke
- Gillis de Coster, Den Cruys-Wech Christi
- Matthias Pauli, Manuel de la confrerie du glorieux patriarche S. Joseph (reprinted 1623, 1625)

1624

- Matthias Pauli, Handt-Boecxkin voor de Broederschap van den Glorieusen Patriarch S. Joseph, translated by Cornelis vander Meeren

1626

- Ordonnantien der Sodaliteyt vande Moeder Godts Maria, op-gherecht in't Collegie van de Societeyt Iesv binnen de stadt van Gendt
- Matthias Pauli, Arbor vitae proferens fructus duodecim, sive Considerationes Eucharisticae
