= Johannes Wamesius =

- Jan Wames
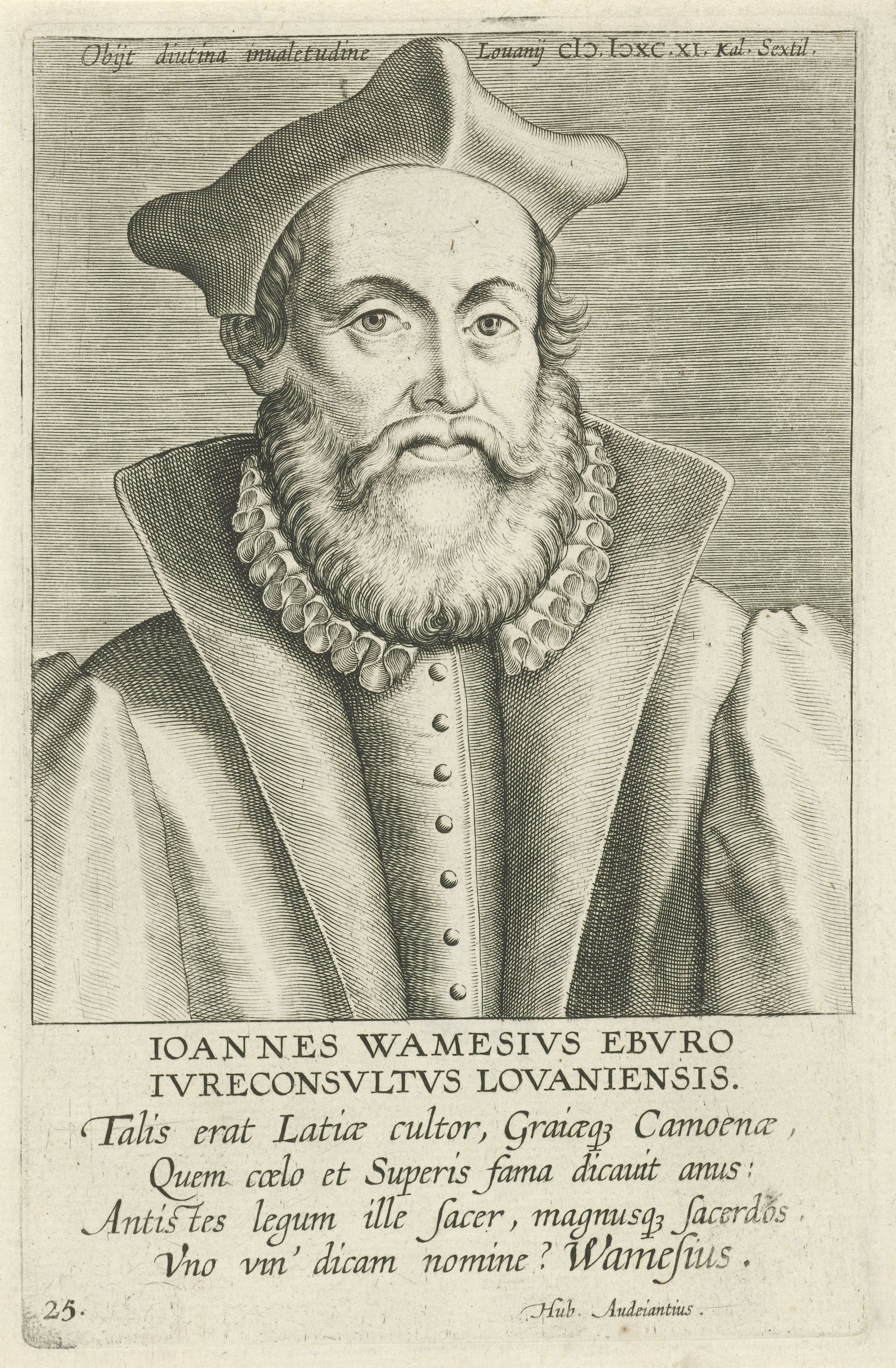
- Portrait of Johannes Wamesius attributed to the workshop of Peter Galle
- Born: 1524; Liège, Prince-Bishopric of Liège, Holy Roman Empire
- Died: 21 June 1590 (aged 65–66); Leuven, Duchy of Brabant, Spanish Netherlands
- Education: Leuven University
- Scientific career
- Fields: Canon law
- Workplaces: Leuven University
- Thesis: (1553)

Jan Wames, Latinized Johannes Wamesius (1524–1590) was a professor of canon law at the University of Leuven.

== Life ==
Wamesius studied law and ancient languages at Leuven, graduating Doctor of both laws on 29 August 1553. In 1555 he was appointed a professor in the Faculty of Law, and in 1570 first professor of canon law. He wrote legal opinions on the application of both canon and civil law that were highly valued by the governor-general, John of Austria. He was offered a place on the governor-general's council but turned down the appointment in order to keep teaching. His writings were only published posthumously.

One case on which he advised on the application of the law of negligence was that of Willem van Aarschot, who while walking near an archery range was blinded in one eye by an arrow shot by Willem van den Putte.

== Writings ==
- Recitationes ad tit. XXVIII lib. II Decret. de Appellationibus (Leuven, Gerard Rivius, 1599); dedicated to Heinrich von Ruisschenberch, commander of the Teutonic Order
- Responsorum sive Consiliorum de Jure pontificio (2 vols., Leuven, Gerard Rivius, 1605); dedicated to Ferdinand of Bavaria
- Responsorum sive Consiliorum ad Jus forumque civile pertinentium centuriae (3 vols., Leuven, Hendrik Hastens, 1625); dedicated to the States of Brabant
