= Cornelius Wytfliet =

Belgian cartographer

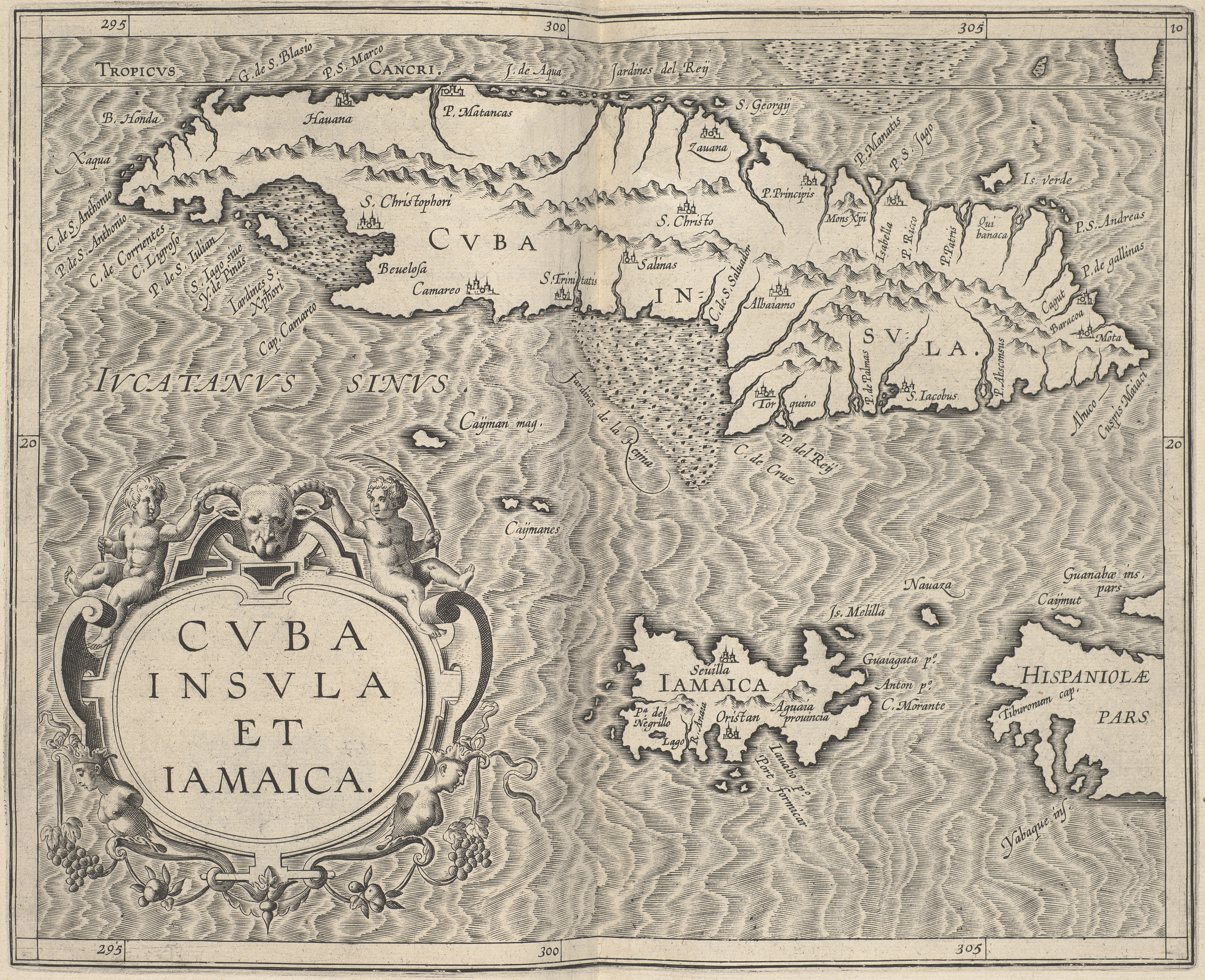
Map of Cuba and Jamaica from Wytfliet's Descriptionis Ptolemaicæ augmentum (1597)

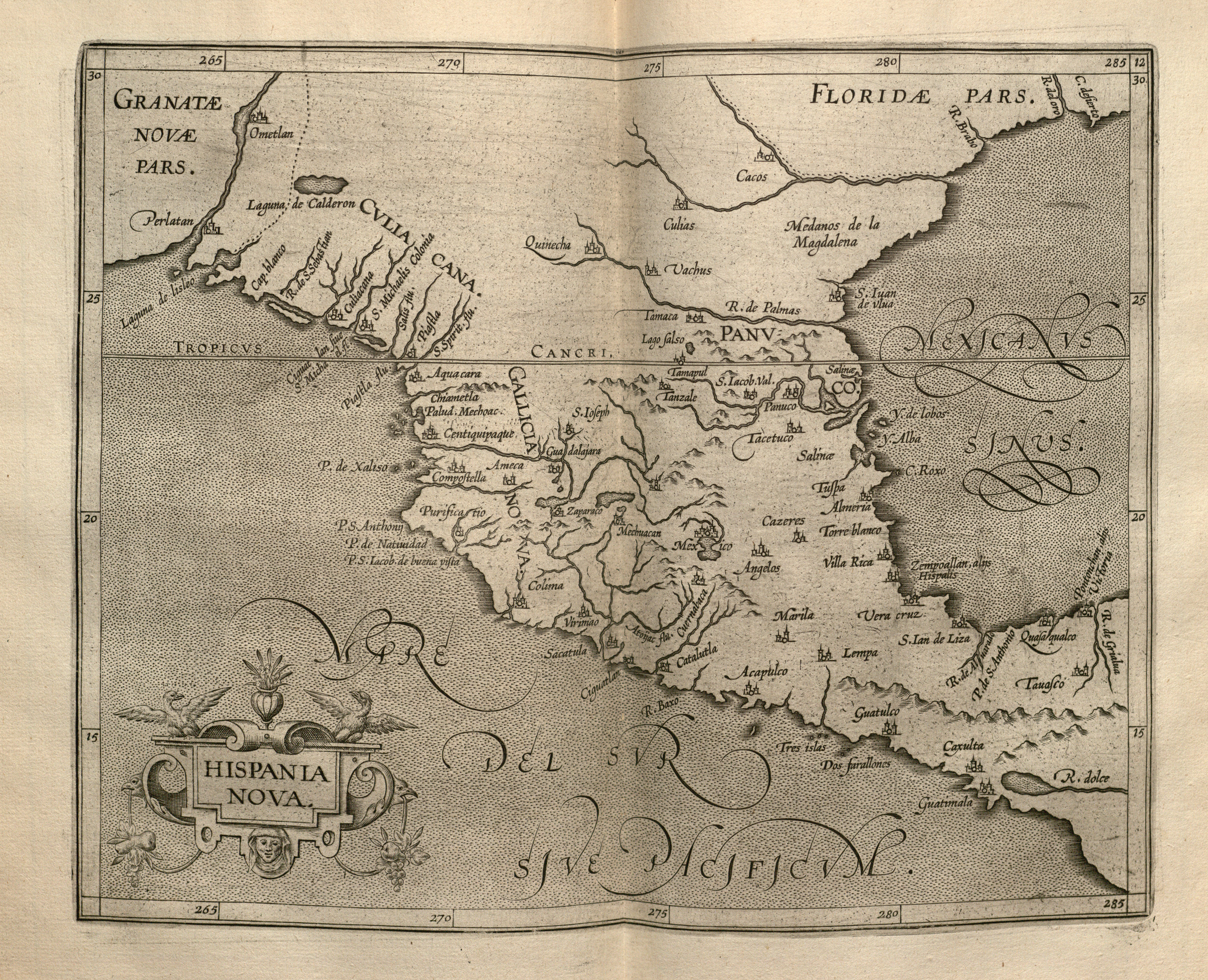
Wytfliet's map of New Spain

Cornelius Wytfliet or Cornelis van Wytfliet (died around 1597) was a geographer from Leuven in the Habsburg Netherlands, best known for producing the first atlas of the Americas.

== Life ==
Cornelius was the son of Catherine Huybrechts and her husband, Gregorius Wytfliet, who was advocate fiscal of Leuven University from 1557 to 1594.

After graduating Licentiate in Laws from the University of Leuven, Wytfliet moved to Brussels and became secretary to the Council of Brabant. He died in or shortly after 1597, when his Descriptionis Ptolemaicae Augmentum (a work adding new discoveries to Ptolemy's description of the world) was published.

== Works ==
- Descriptionis Ptolemaicae Augmentum (Leuven, Joannes Bogardus, 1597)
  - Reissued Leuven, Gerard Rivius, 1598 – On Google Books
  - Translated into French as Histoire universelle des Indes occidentales (Douai, François Fabri, 1607) – On Google Books
