= Lake Wickenden =

Lake in Quebec Canada

- Location within Quebec
- Location: Anticosti Island, Saint Lawrence River, Minganie Regional County Municipality, Côte-Nord, Quebec, Canada
- Coordinates: 49°33′08″N 63°03′51″W
- Type: Natural
- Primary inflows: (clockwise, from the mouth) discharge of Lac de la Tête, two discharges of small lakes, discharge of Wilcox lake, discharge of Lac de la Traverse.
- Primary outflows: discharge of the lake, going to Jupiter River
- Basin countries: Canada
- Max. length: 4.5 km (2.8 mi)
- Max. width: 3.6 km (2.2 mi)
- Surface elevation: 196 m (643 ft)

Lake Wickenden (French: Lac Wickenden) is the largest lake on Anticosti Island, located in the municipality of L'Île-d'Anticosti, in the Saint Lawrence River, in the Minganie Regional County Municipality, in the administrative region of the Côte-Nord, in the province of Quebec, Canada.

Together with the surrounding 69,111 km^{2} (26,684 sq mi), this lake was designated as a protected area on January 1, 1993 by the WCPA. This area is designated "Rare Forest of Lac-Wickenden".

Forestry is the main economic activity in the area, followed by recreational tourism.

== Geography ==
Glacially formed, Lake Wickenden is part of the Jupiter River watershed. Several surrounding lakes are surrounded by small areas of marsh.

Lake Wickenden has a length of 4.5 km (2.8 mi), a width of 3.6 km (2.2 mi) and an elevation of 196 m (643 ft). A strip of land separates Lac de la Tête and Lake Wickenden.

The hamlet Wickenden is located at the end of a bay on the western shore of the lake. A second hamlet designated Lac-de-la-Tête is located 0.5 km (0.31 mi) north-west of the first. An access road (coming from the west) serves this hamlet and the south shore of the lake.

== Toponymy ==
Maps from the late 1930s indicate "Wickenden Lake". The lake was named after Henri Robert Wickenden who worked on Anticosti Island for the Wayagamack Paper Corporation in the 1920s. Wickenden also served as a forestry director for the Wayagamack Pulp and Paper Company. In 1926, his team assessed the economic potential of the Anticostian forests; the Wickenden team drew positive conclusions recommending this proposed acquisition. Wickenden then represented the Anticosti Corporation; this company then included the Wayagamack, the St. Mauritius Valley Corporation and the Port Alfred Pulp and Paper Company. On July 29, 1926, this company acquired the island; the seller being the French senator Gaston Menier.

The toponym "lac Wickenden" was made official on December 5, 1968 at the Commission de toponymie du Québec place name bank.
