= Jan Frans De Vriendt =

Belgian sculptor

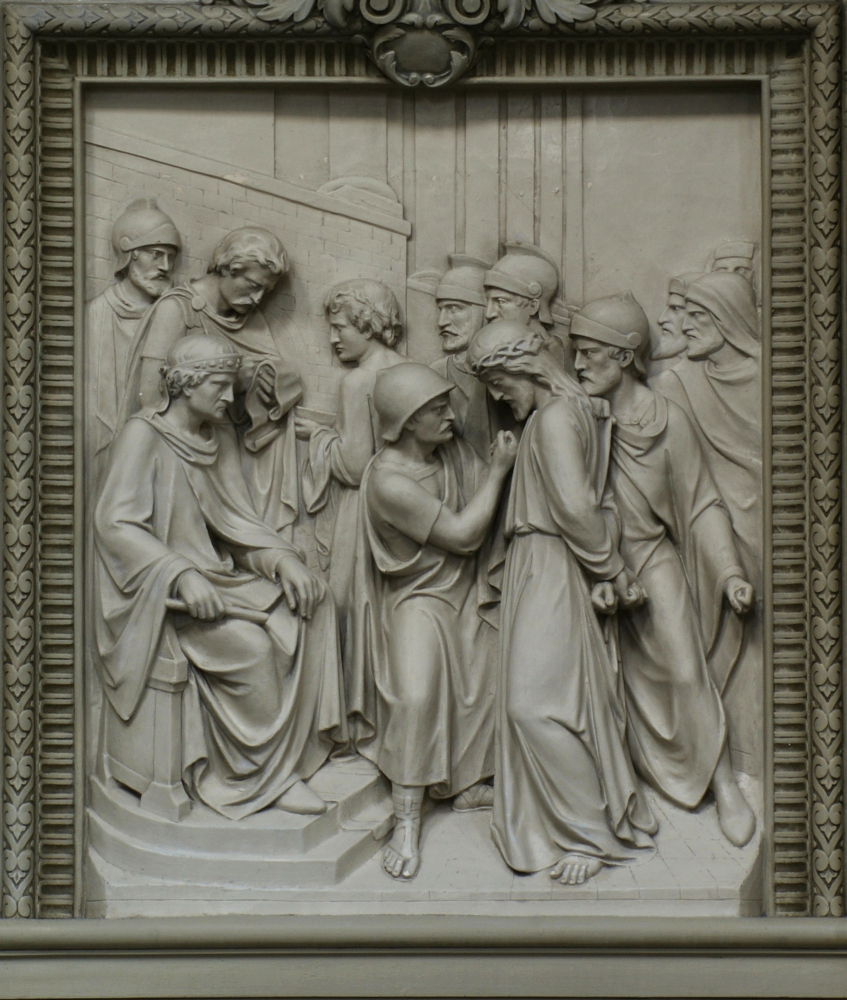
Way of Sorrows in the Heilige Familie en Sint-Corneliuskerk, Borgerhout

Jan Frans De Vriendt (4 or 24 June 1829 – 16 April 1919) was a Belgian sculptor.

== Life and work ==
Jan Frans De Vriendt (or Jean François De Vriendt) was born in Lier on 24 June 1829. He lived and worked in Borgerhout. He was educated (from 1847 to 1859) at the academies of Mechelen, where he studied under Joseph Tuerlinckx, and Antwerp. He was married to Catharina Maria Philomina Eulaers. Two of their children, Henricus Gustavus and Franciscus Jacobus Ludovicus, also became sculptors. Franciscus Jacobus Ludovicus De Vriendt later became an actor, performing with success in South Africa, where he died in 1946.

Frans De Vriendt made monumental statues in stone, bronze or wood, as well as portrait reliefs and bas-reliefs. Most of his clientele was from Belgian, but he also had foreign clients, notably from the United Kingdom and in the Netherlands. He delivered Stations of the Cross to more than thirty places of worship, including the churches of Mechelen, Hoboken, Merksplas, Schilde, Stabroek and Tollembeek.

In the 1860s, De Vriendt was a teacher of Sculpture at the Academy of Fine Arts in Antwerp. The Dutch sculptor Hendrik van der Geld (1838–1914) studied in Antwerp from about 1863 to 1870 and was trained by him.

De Vriendt died in Borgerhout at the age of 89. The interment took place at the Borgerhout cemetery Silsburg, but his grave no longer exists. The local population honored him by naming Frans De Vriendtstraat after him.

== Gallery ==
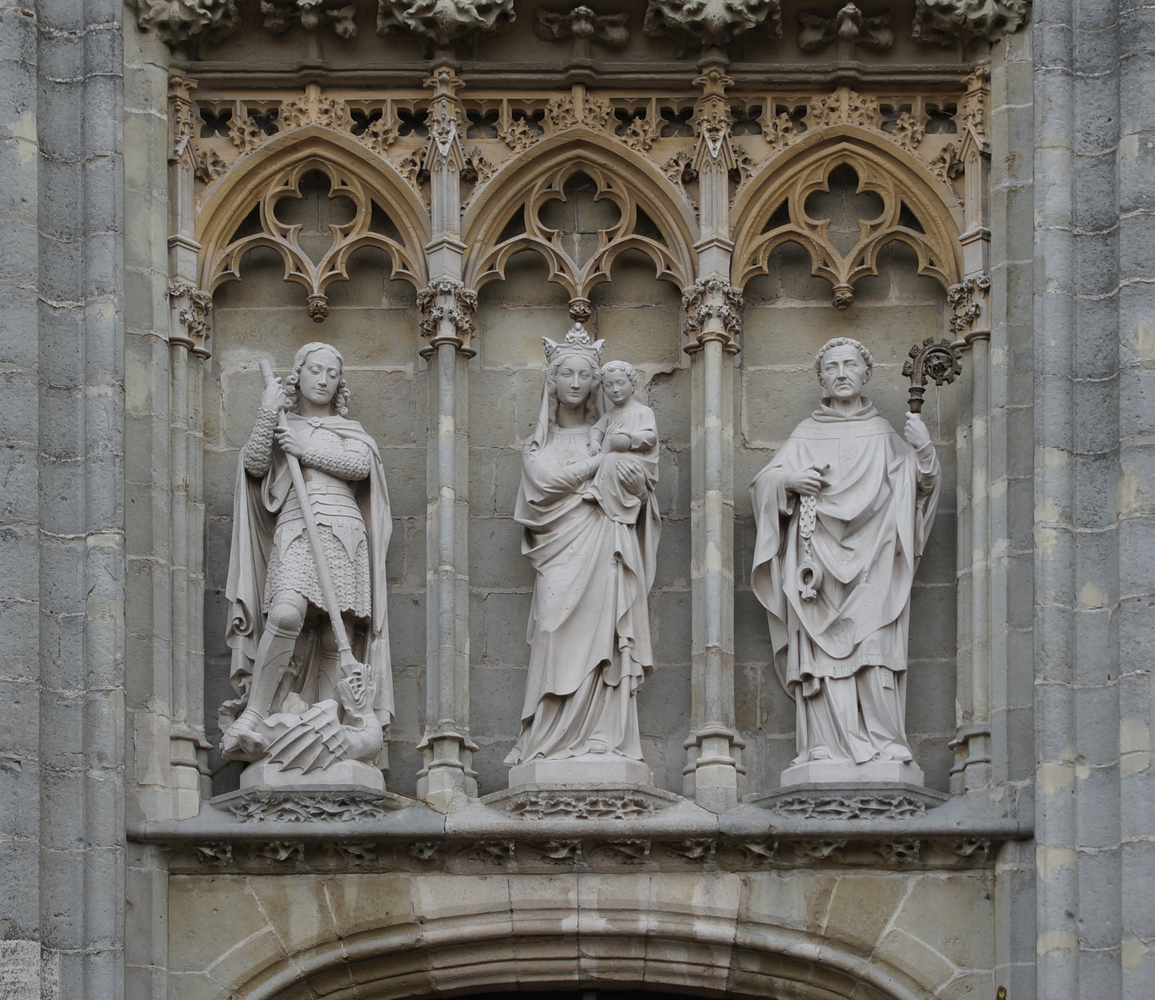
Statues of Michael, Mary and Leonardus, above the portal of :nl:Sint-Leonarduskerk in Saint Lenaarts

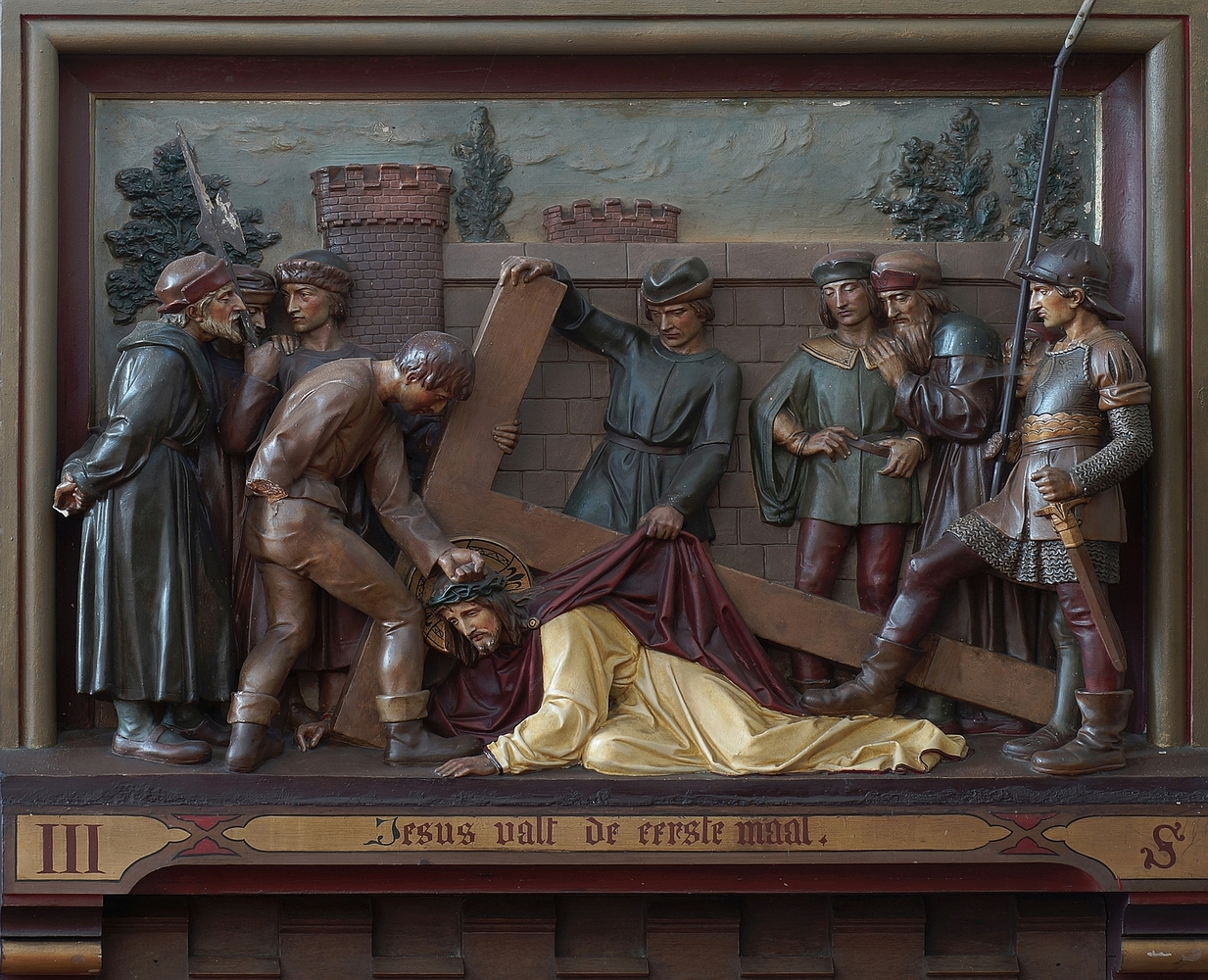
Way of Sorrows in Saint Willibrord Church, Merksplas

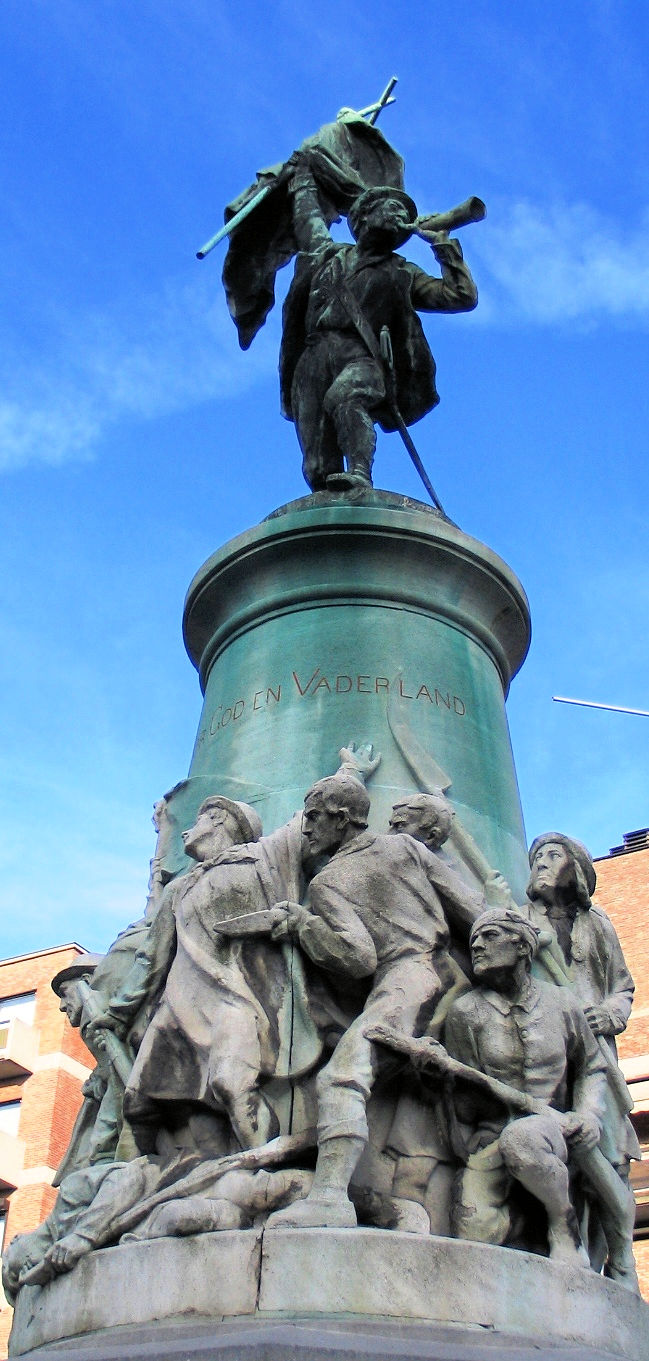
Statue in Hasselt in honor of the Peasant Warrior
