= Maximiliaan de Vriendt =

Maximus Æmilianus Vrientius
- Maximiliaan de Vriendt
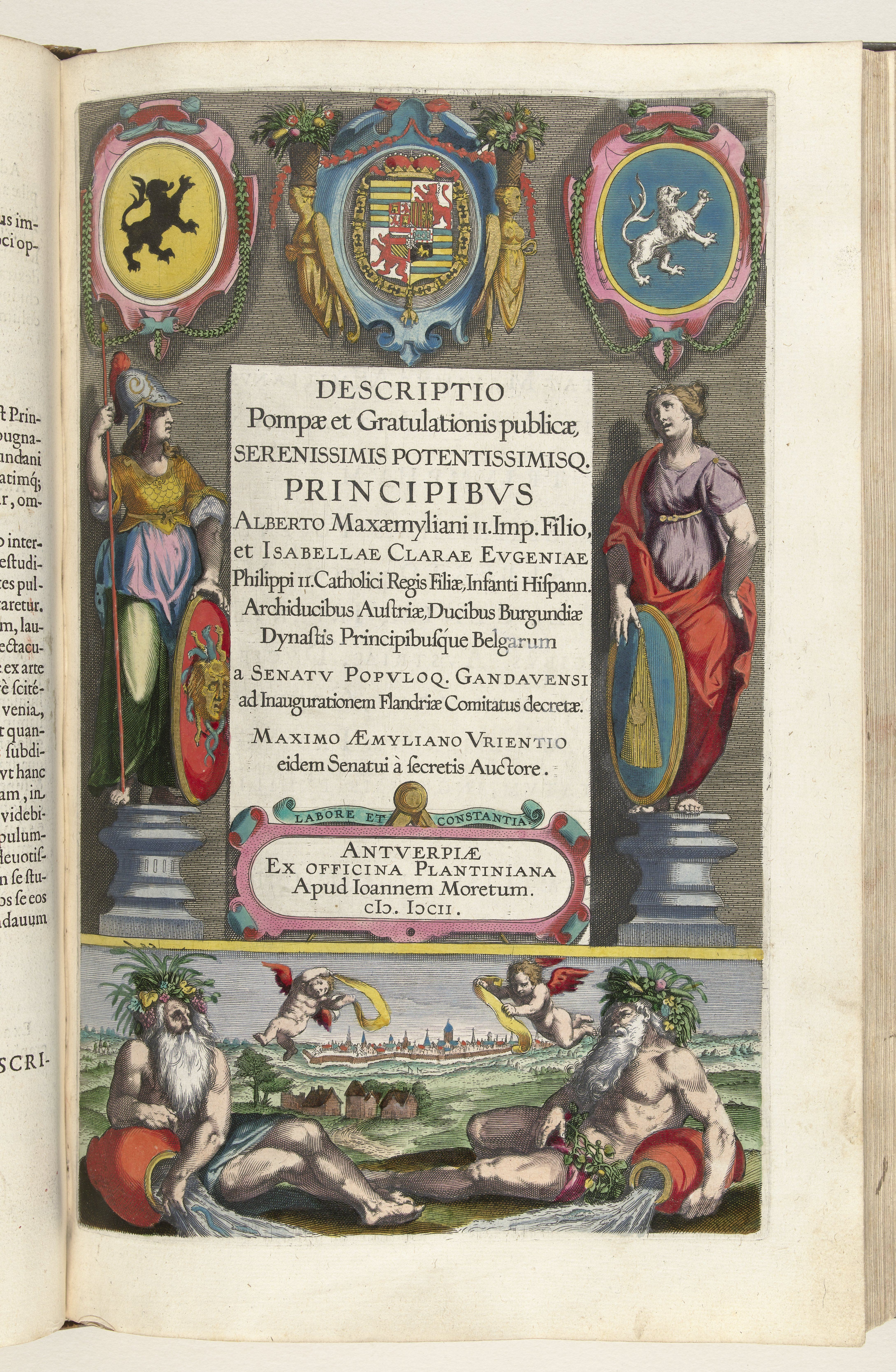
- Frontispiece of Maximiliaan de Vriendt, Descriptio Pompae et Gratulationis (1602)
- Born: 31 January 1559; Veere, County of Zeeland, Habsburg Netherlands
- Died: 27 December 1614 (aged 55); Ghent, County of Flanders, Spanish Netherlands
- Education: Leuven University, Paris University
- Occupation: civic office-holder
- Spouses: 1. Josyne de Harduyn 2. Josyne Vyts
- Children: Josyne de Vriendt
- Relatives: Justus de Harduwijn (nephew)
- Writing career
- Language: Neo-Latin
- Period: 1585–1614
- Genre: verse
- Subjects: occasional verse, epigrams, prayers
- Notable works: Epigrammatum Libri IX (Antwerp, 1603).

Maximiliaan de Vriendt, Latinized Maximus Æmilianus Vrientius (1559–1614), was a Neo-Latin poet and a civic office-holder in the city of Ghent.

== Life ==
De Vriendt was born at Zandenburg Castle, Veere, on 31 January 1559, to Jacques Jacobs de Vriendt and Maria de Lattre. The family was from Ghent and returned there soon after his birth. He graduated Bachelor of Arts from Leuven University on 6 March 1578, and then spent some time studying law at the University of Paris.

After touring Italy he returned to Ghent in 1579, but was banished from the city on 8 December 1583 for his opposition to the Calvinist regime that had come to power. He returned to Ghent in 1584, and on 14 or 15 May was apprehended and tortured. He was not released until 3 September 1584, when the city surrendered to the commander in chief of the Army of Flanders, the Prince of Parma.

On 15 November 1584 De Vriendt was appointed secretary to the city, and on 12 January 1585 captain of a company of the watch. His first wife, Josyne de Harduyn, died 4 March 1585, and their newborn child shortly afterwards. Late in 1585 he remarried, to Josyne Vyts, a widow.

As secretary of the city his duties included writing speeches, poems, inscriptions and chronograms for special occasions such as the Joyous Entry into the city of a new ruler or governor. In July and August 1602 he attended the Siege of Ostend, reporting on events to the city council.

On 19 April 1605 his daughter, Josyne, married Jean de Forneau, lord of Cruyckenburch.

De Vriendt died in Ghent on 27 December 1614 and four days later was buried in the Dominican church in the city.

== Works ==
- "Descriptio Pompae et Gratulationis publicae, ... a senatu populoq. Gandavensi ad Inaugurationem Flandriae Comitatus decretae", in Joannes Bochius, Historica narratio profectionis et inaugurationis Serenissimorum Belgii Principum Alberti et Isabellae (Antwerp, Jan Mortus at the Plantin Press, 1602), pp. 317–344 - an account of the reception of Albert and Isabella in Ghent.
- Epigrammatum Libri IX (Antwerp, Joachim Trognaesius, 1603). Reprinted in Innsbruck, 1607, and in Bruges by Nicolaes Breyghel in 1627.
- Panegyricus in adventum Rmi. D. Caroli Masii quarti Gandensium Episcopi (Ghent, Cornelis vander Meeren, 1610) – celebrating the arrival of Carolus Maes as the fourth Bishop of Ghent.
- Urbes Flandriæ et Brabantiæ (Leuven, Gerard Rivius, 1614).
- Sacrorum Carminum (Leuven, Christophus Flavius, 1614).
