= Ferdinand of Bavaria =

Ferdinand of Bavaria may refer to:

- Ferdinand of Bavaria (bishop) (1577–1650)
- Ferdinand of Bavaria (soldier) (1550–1608)
- Prince Ferdinand of Bavaria (1884–1958)
