= Mespelare =

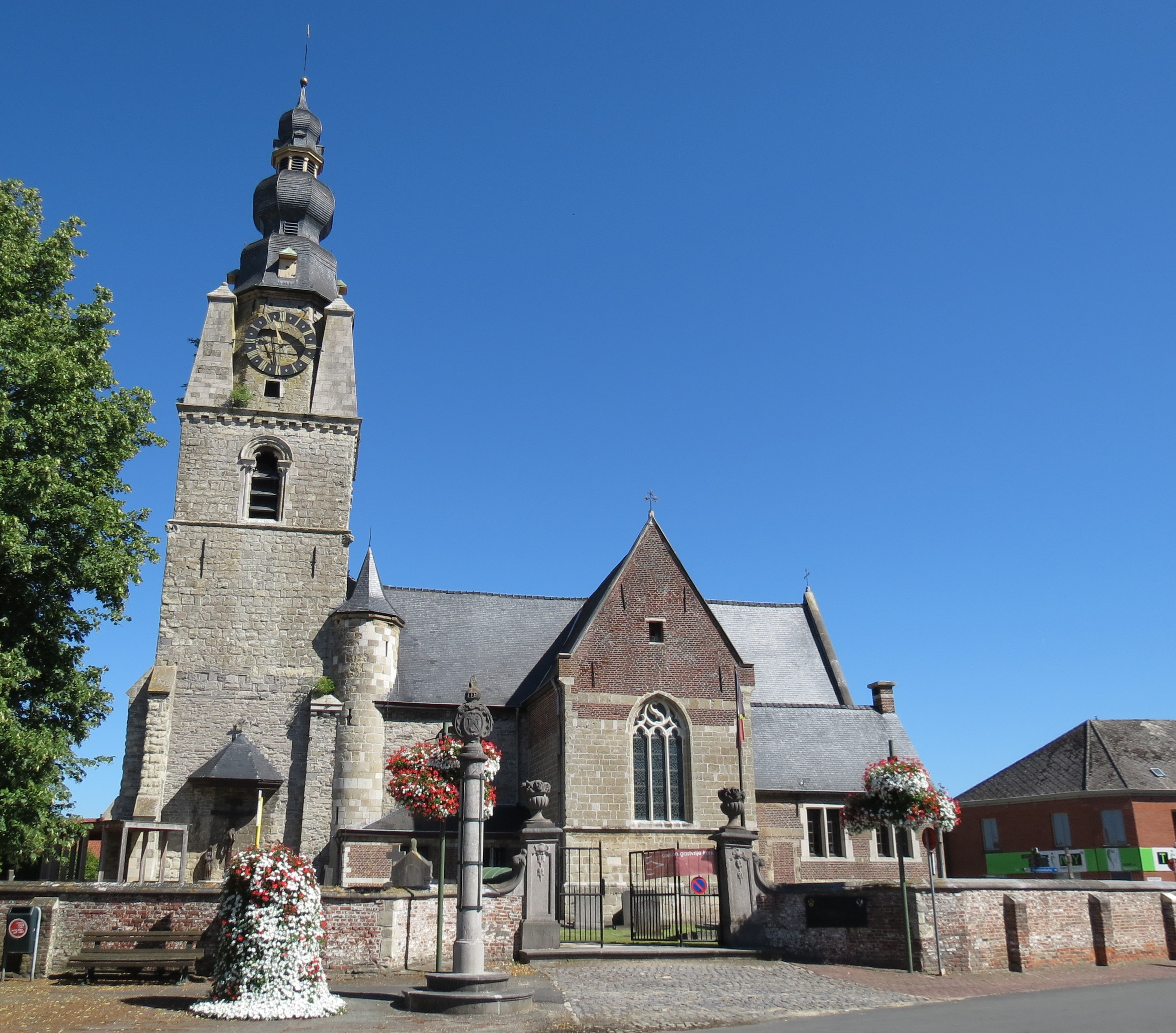
- Mespelare, with its church and pillory

- Location within Belgium Location within Europe
- Coordinates: 50°59′46″N 04°09′12″E
- Country: Belgium
- Region: Flanders
- Province: East Flanders
- Municipality: Dendermonde

Mespelare is a village and a district in the municipality of Dendermonde, in East Flanders, Belgium.

During the Middle Ages, the village was owned by the Count of Flanders. It later passed into the hands of the Royen and Goubau families. The village church, dedicated to Saint Aldegund, is of Romanesque origins and dates to the 12th century. In front of the church, an 18th century pillory has been preserved; it contains the coat of arms of the Goubau family which at the time were the lords of the village.
