= Anticosti National Park =

National park in Quebec

- Parc National d'Anticosti
- IUCN category II (national park)
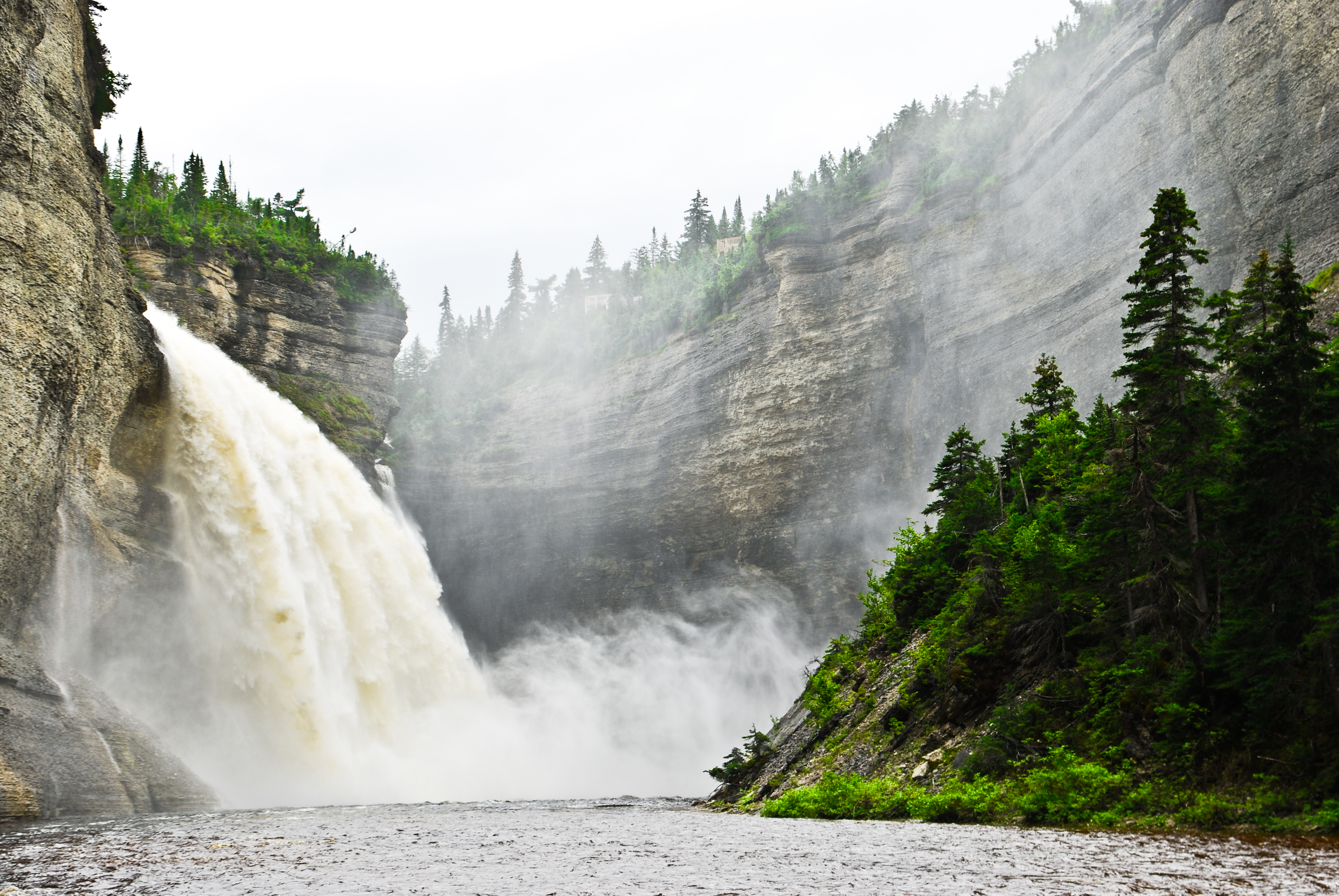
- Cliff wall, fall and Vauréal River

- Location within Quebec
- Interactive map of Anticosti National Park
- Location: Quebec, Canada
- Nearest city: Port-Menier, Quebec
- Coordinates: 49°30′N 62°50′W
- Area: 571.9 km^{2} (220.8 sq mi)
- Established: April 2001
- Visitors: 5500 (in 2009)
- Governing body: Sépaq
- Website: www.sepaq.com/pq/pan/

Anticosti National Park (French (official): Parc National d'Anticosti) is a provincial park of Quebec, located in the Gulf of St. Lawrence. It consists of 3 non-contiguous areas totalling 572 square kilometres (221 sq mi) of land in the centre of Anticosti Island. Portions of the park are within Anticosti World Heritage site.

== Tourism ==
It is organized into 6 tourist sectors and 1 central zone:

- Baie-de-la-Tour
- Chicotte
- Chute-Vauréal
- Grotte-à-la-Patate
- Observation
- Vauréal-la-Mer
- Zone centrale

== History ==
The idea of creating a park on Anticosti Island goes far back. Already in the 1920s, the richness of Anticosti's flora was highlighted by botanist Marie-Victorin, who described the canyon of the Vauréal River as a "remarkable sanctuary" for ferns. But for the following decades, the entire island was privately owned by a succession of logging companies who invested little or nothing in environmental protection.

In 1974, Anticosti Island was bought by the Government of Quebec and became public land once again. In 1987, the Regional County Municipality of Minganie officially incorporated the idea of creating a park in the Vauréal River area in its development plan. Thereafter, it took 14 years to complete the research, studies, planning, and public hearings. The Quebec government created "Anticosti National Park" on April 26, 2001. Despite its name, it is a provincial park, and not part of the country's national park system.

== Park features ==
Natural attractions:

- Vauréal Canyon and Waterfall - At the Vauréal Waterfall, the Vauréal River drops 76 metres (249 ft) and then flows through a 90 metres (300 ft) deep gorge.
- Tour Bay (Bay de la Tour) - This bay on the north side of the island is noteworthy for its breathtaking seascape with huge cliffs surrounding the bay and excellent bird watching opportunities.
- Potato Cave (Grotte à la Patate) - This 625 metres (2,051 ft) cave is one of the longest caves in Quebec. It is named after the Potato River (Rivière à la Patate) which gets its name from a large granite erratic boulder shaped like a potato that is located at the river's mouth.
- Brick River Canyon
- Observation River Canyon

Activities:

- Hiking - 45 kilometres (28 mi) of trails of various difficulty
- Horseback riding
- Sea kayaking
- Guided tours

Park amenities:

- 2 Visitor centres with restaurant, gasoline, and equipment rental
- Accommodation in inns, cabins, or campgrounds
- Picnic areas

== UNESCO's World Heritage ==
On September 19, 2023, Anticosti was inscribed on UNESCO's World Heritage List. It is recognized for its exceptional fossil assemblage representing the first global mass extinction of animal life on Earth.

Located within protected areas free from any industrial activity, the site is endowed with exceptionally well-preserved, abundant and diverse fossil fauna. This Anticosti fauna represents the first mass extinction of animal life on a global scale, 447 – 437 million years ago, at the end of the Ordovician period.

Vauréal Canyon

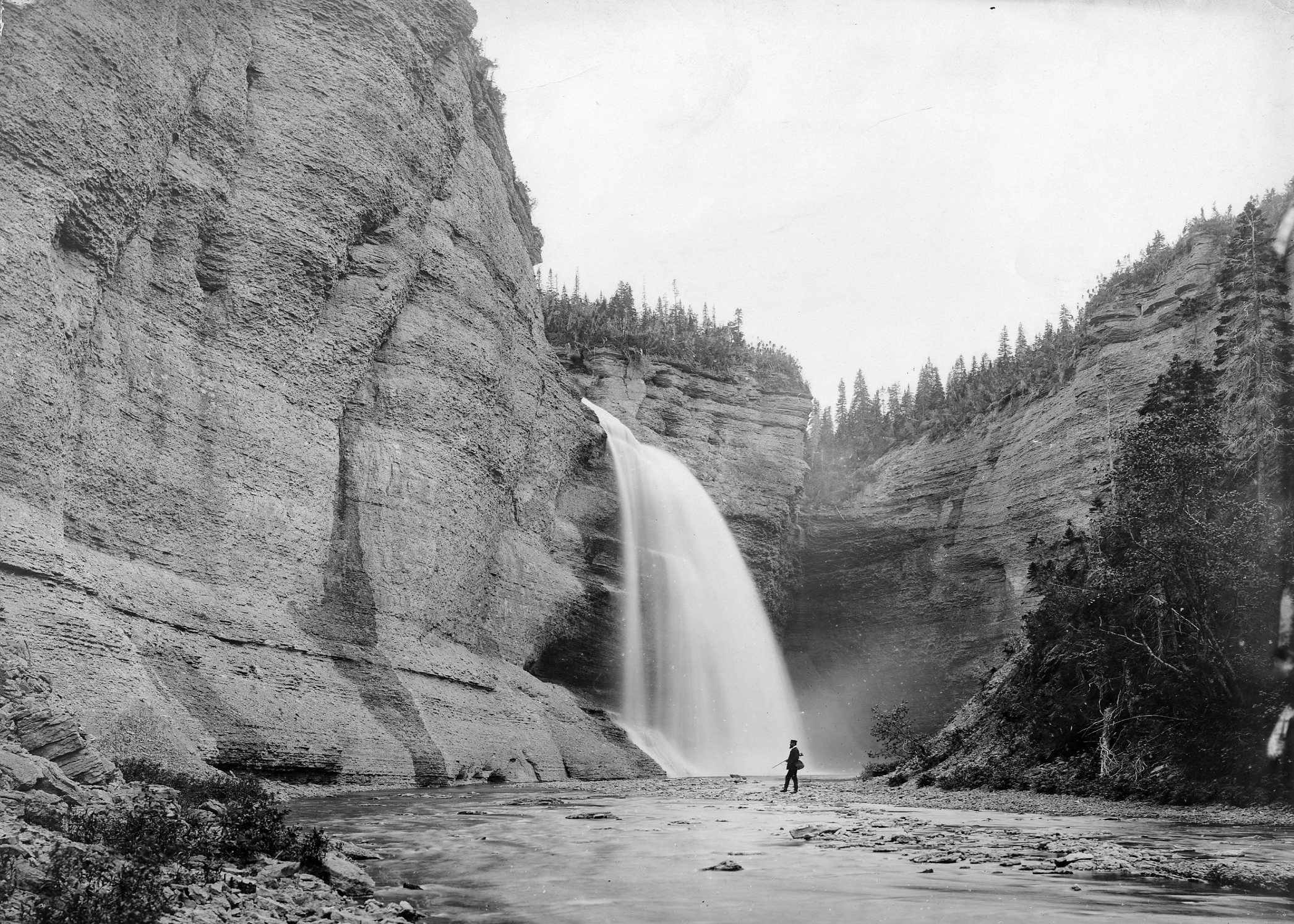
Cliff wall, fall and Vauréal River

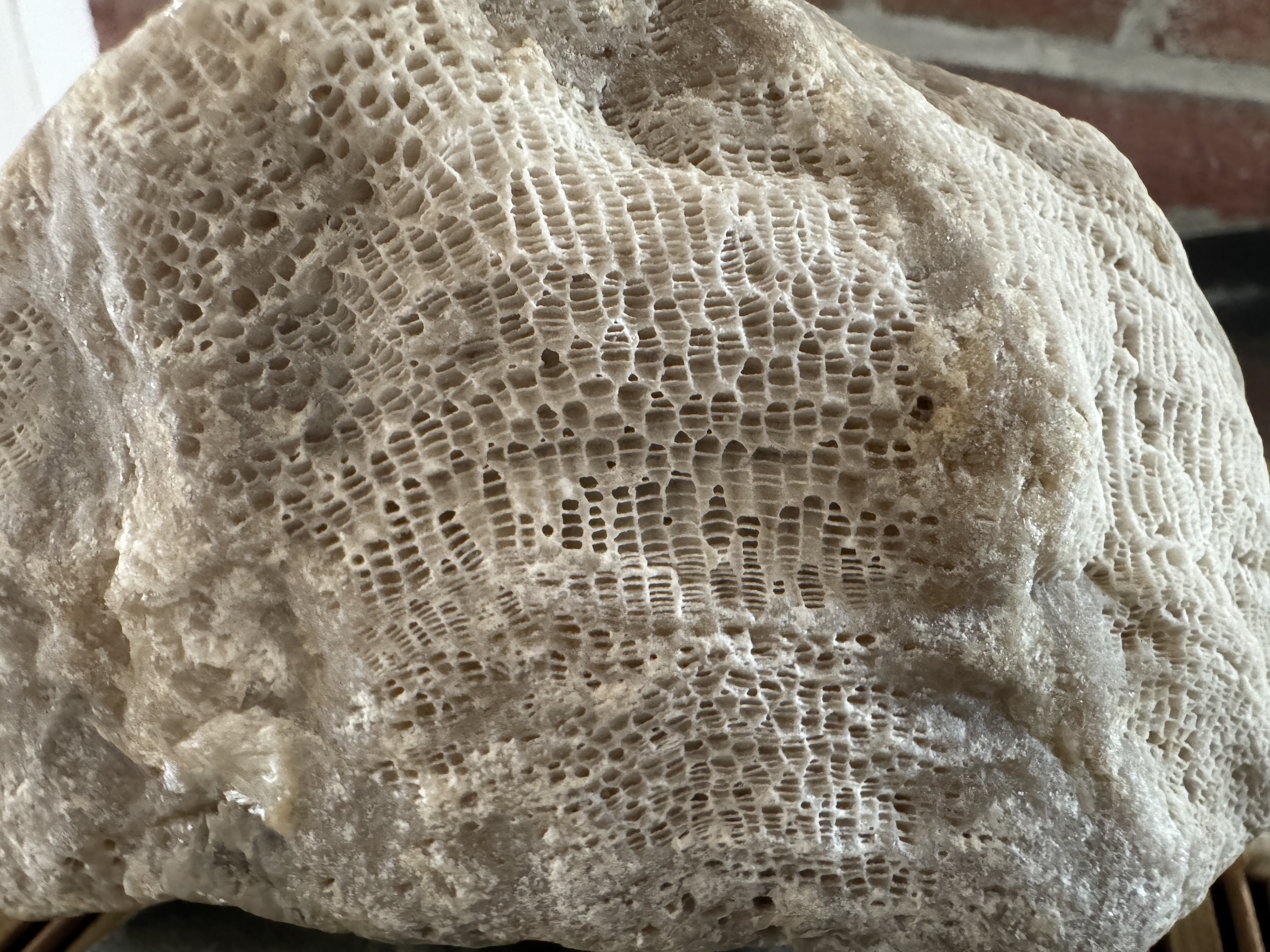
Fossil (probably sponge), in the gravel, at the foot of the wall

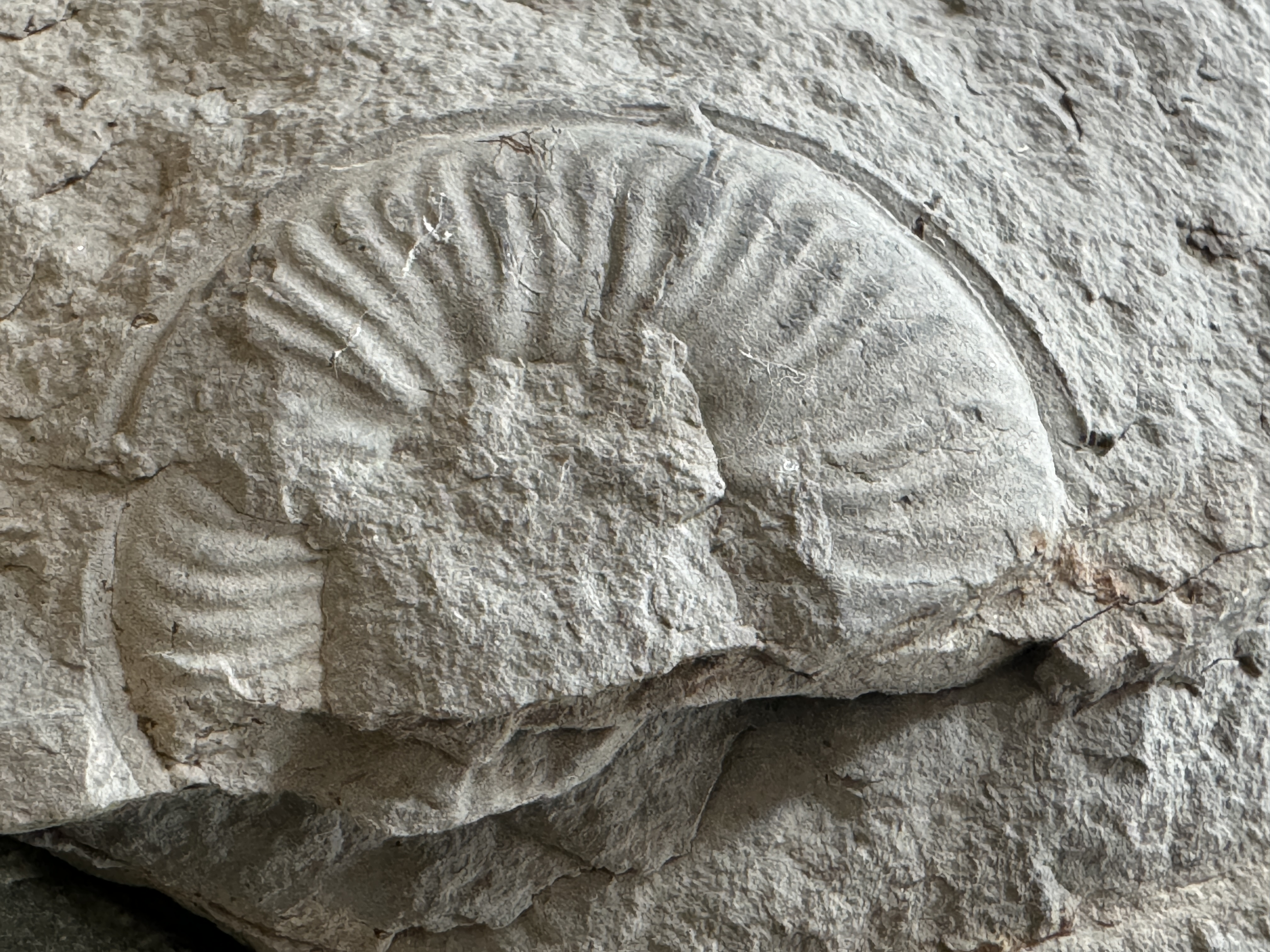
Fossil to be identified, in the gravel, at the foot of the wall

The Vauréal River, with its source in Lake Vauréal, flows 25 km, south then northeast, in the eastern part of the island. The salmon go up the river to the Vauréal Falls, 13 km from the coast, crossing the Vauréal canyon where the river is enclosed between two limestone walls.
