= Grand-Lac-Salé Ecological Reserve =

Ecological reserve in Quebec, Canada

Coordinates: 49.3358°N 63.3228°W

- IUCN category Ia (strict nature reserve)
- Interactive map of Grand-Lac-Salé Ecological Reserve
- Location: L'Île-d'Anticosti (Anticosti Island), Minganie Regional County Municipality, Québec, Canada
- Established: January 24, 1996

Grand-Lac-Salé Ecological Reserve is an ecological reserve of Quebec, Canada. It was established on January 24, 1996. It is located on the south shore of Anticosti Island.
