= Honguedo Strait =

Strait in Quebec, Canada

Coordinates: 49°33′41″N 63°59′45″W

- Détroit de Honguedo
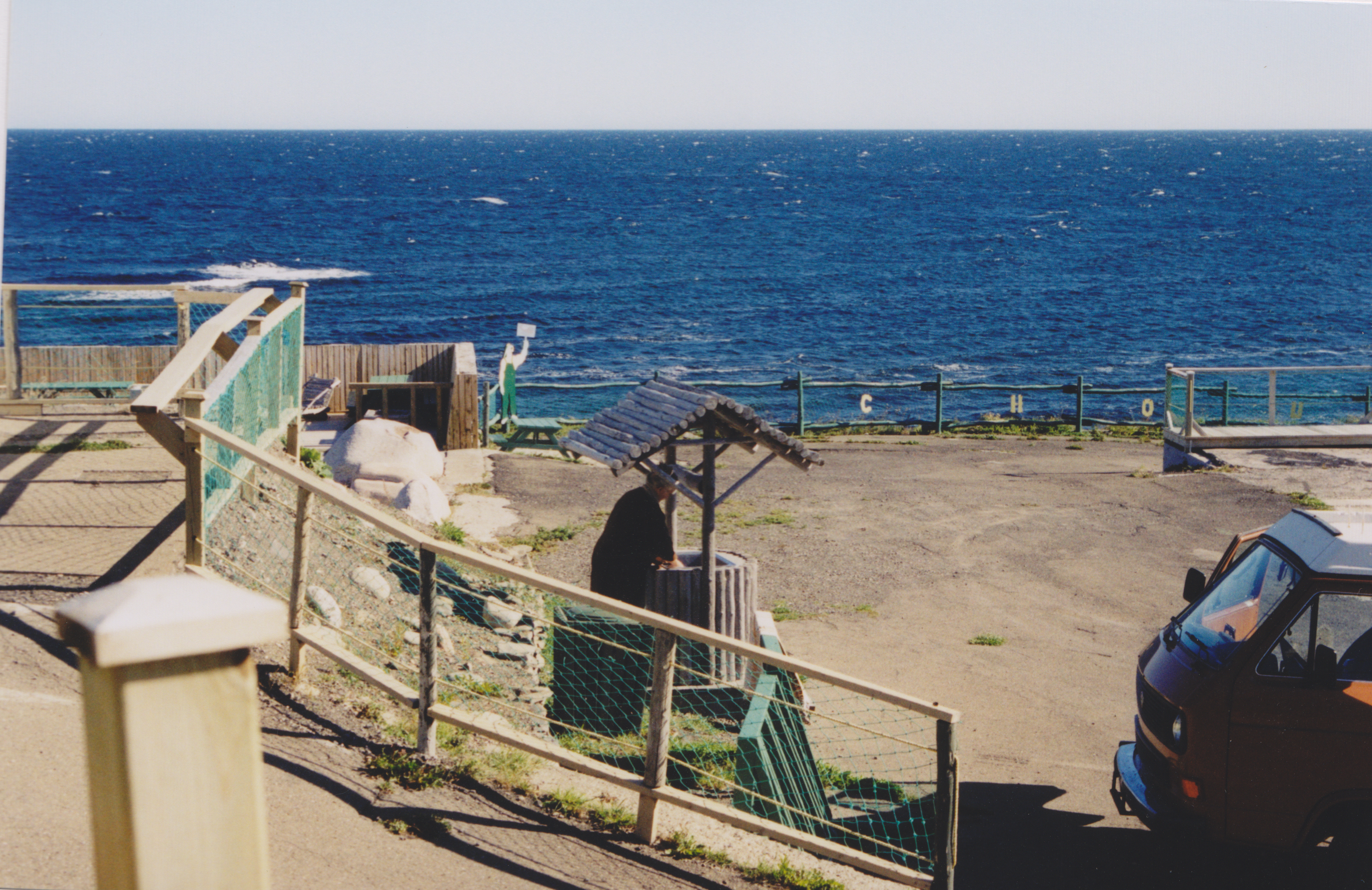
- Gulf of St. Lawrence, Gaspé, Saint-Maurice-de-l'Échouerie village, municipal stop of the Old Factory
- Interactive map of Honguedo Strait
- Location: Gulf of St. Lawrence
- Basin countries: Quebec, Canada

The Honguedo Strait (French: Détroit d'Honguedo), the toponym designates the wide passage of the Gulf of St. Lawrence between the Gaspésie peninsula and Anticosti Island, Quebec, Canada.

== Toponymy ==
The name Honguedo first appeared in the reports of Jacques Cartier of 1535–1536. In the 16th century, it was known as the Saint-Pierre Strait, especially on maps by Gerardus Mercator (1569) and Cornelius Wytfliet (1597).

Only by the 20th century, Honguedo came into use, and in 1934, the Geographic Board of Quebec officially adopted it to commemorate the 400th anniversary of Jacques Cartier's arrival in North America. Yet, the origin of the name is uncertain; it may derive from the Mi'kmaq word for "gathering place", or from the Iroquois word hehonguesto, meaning "one's own nose".

About Honguedo Strait

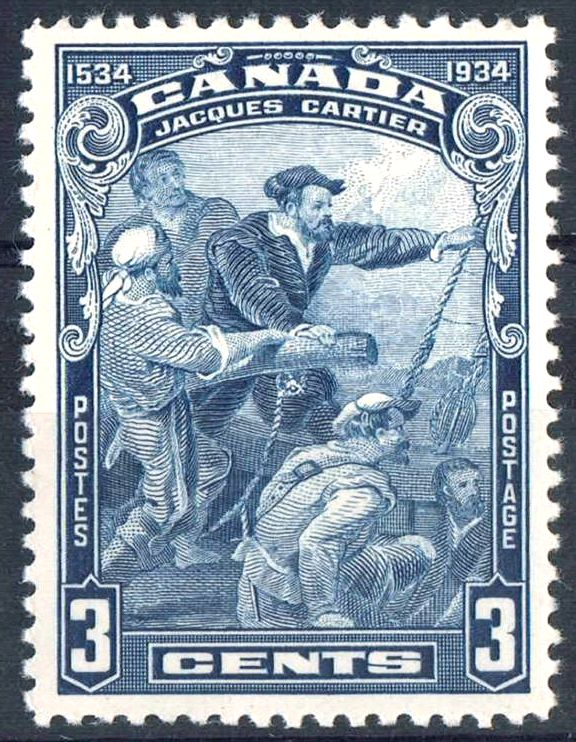
Jacques Cartier (circa 1491-1557), Canada Post 3 cents stamp 1934, designed by George Arthur Gundersen (1910-1975)

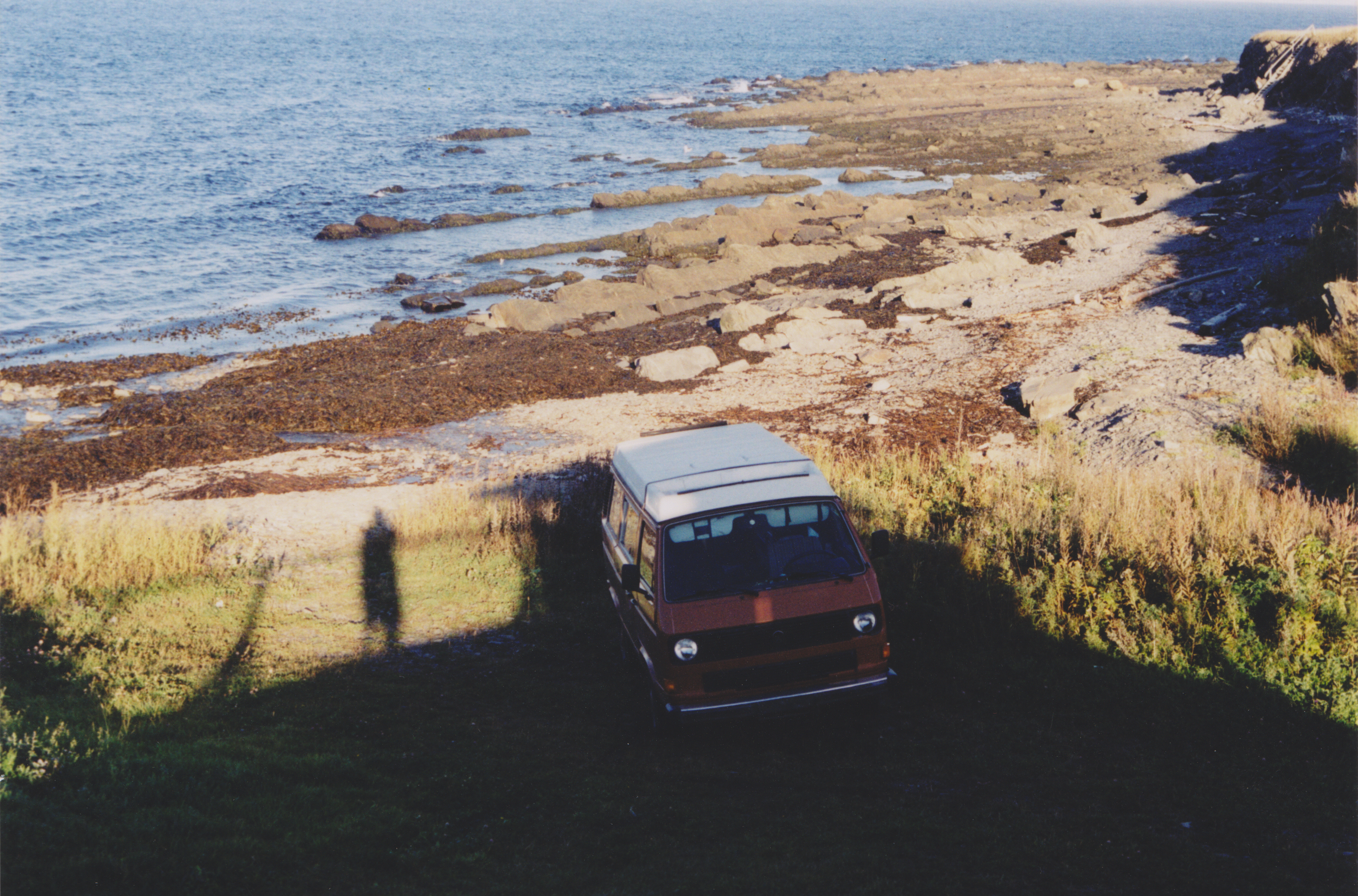
Gulf of St. Lawrence, Gaspé, Saint-Maurice-de-l'Échouerie village, municipal stop of the Old Factory

== Western Honguedo Strait Coral Conservation Area ==
With an area of 496 km2, the Western Honguedo Strait Coral Conservation Area is home to species of corals and sea pens that create structures that provide a diverse habitat for many marine species.

- Pennatula aculeata Danielssen, 1860. — Plume de mer. — (Sea Pen).
- Pennatula grandis Ehrenberg, 1834. — Grande Pennatule. — (Greater sea pen). — Större fjäderpenna (Suédois).
- Anthoptilum grandiflorum (Verrill, 1879). — Pennatule à grandes fleurs. — (Large-flowered pennatula).
