= Mecher =

Coordinates: 49.923°N 5.873°E

Mecher Meecher
- Former commune of Luxembourg
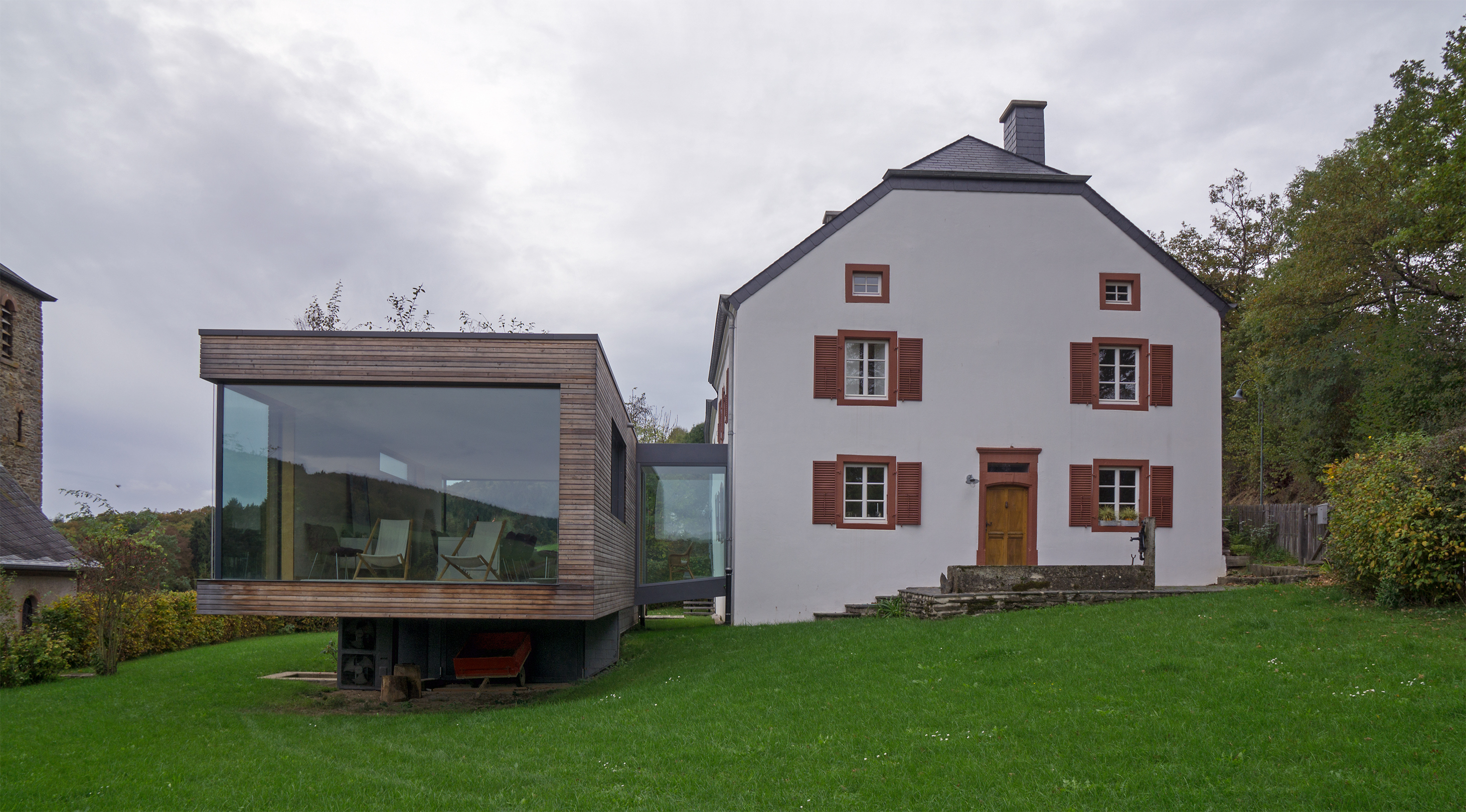
- Former rectory in Mecher
- Interactive map of Mecher
- Country: Luxembourg
- Canton: Wiltz
- Commune: Lac de la Haute-Sûre
- Created: Original commune
- Abolished: 1 January 1979
- Currently: Part of Lac de la Haute-Sûre

Mecher (Luxembourgish: Meecher) is a village in the commune of Lac de la Haute-Sûre, in north-western Luxembourg.It lies 60.7 km from Luxembourg City. As of September 2026, the village has a population of 67.

Mecher was a commune in the canton of Wiltz until 1 January 1979, when it was merged with the commune of Harlange to form the new commune of Lac de la Haute-Sûre. The law creating Lac de la Haute-Sûre was passed on 23 December 1978.

== Former commune ==
The former commune consisted of the villages:

- Bavigne
- Kaundorf
- Liefrange
- Mecher
- Nothum
- Dénkert (Dünkrodt) (lieu-dit)
