= Esch-sur-Sûre Dam =

Dam in Esch-sur-Sûre, Wiltz, Luxembourg

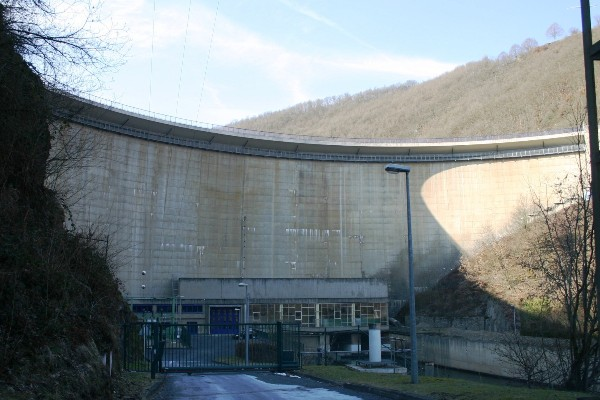
- Downstream face of the dam

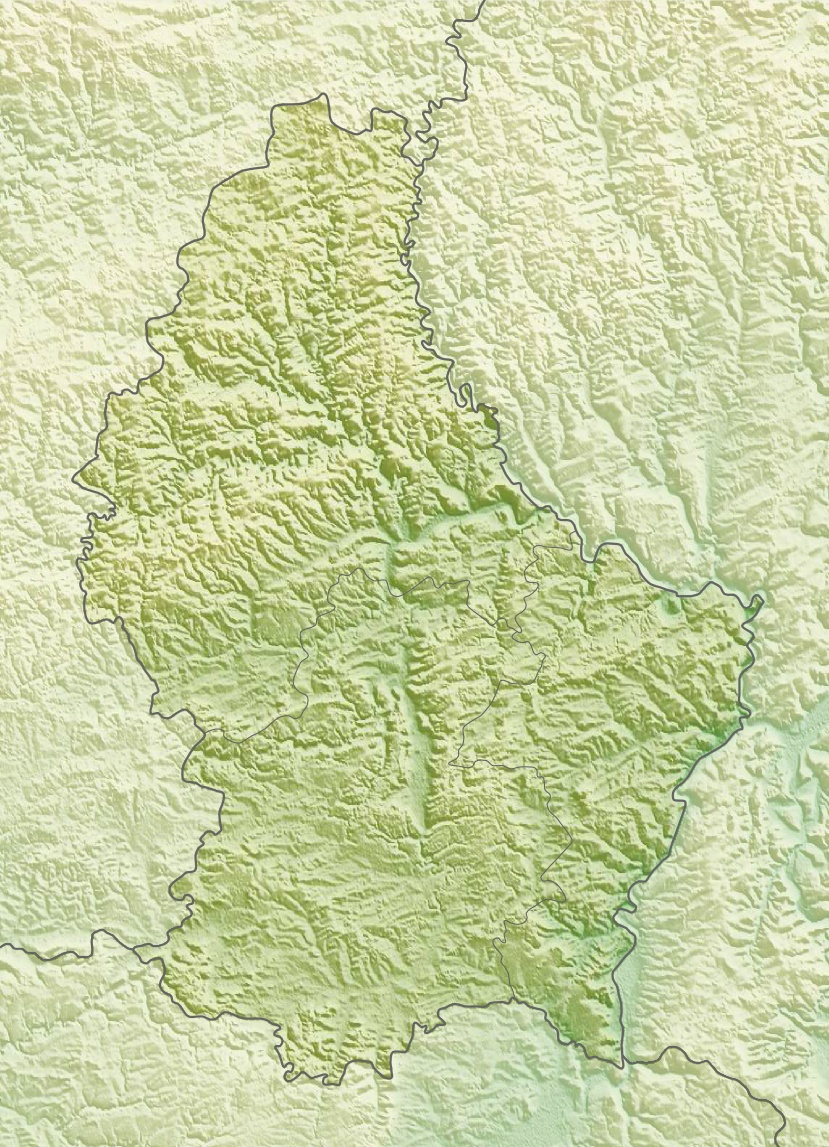
- Location within Luxembourg
- Country: Luxembourg
- Location: Esch-sur-Sûre, Wiltz
- Coordinates: 49°54′42.44″N 5°55′22.20″E
- Purpose: Power
- Status: Operational
- Construction began: 1956
- Opening date: 1957; 69 years ago
- Owners: Administration of Roads and Bridges/Syndicat des Eaux du Barrage d'Esch-sur-Sûre (SEBES)

Dam and spillways
- Type of dam: Arch
- Impounds: River Sauer
- Height: 50 m (160 ft)
- Length: 170 m (560 ft)
- Width (crest): 1.5 m (4.9 ft)
- Width (base): 4.5 m (15 ft)

Reservoir
- Creates: Upper Sûre Lake
- Total capacity: 59,000,000 m^{3} (48,000 acre⋅ft)
- Catchment area: 428 km^{2} (165 mi^{2})
- Surface area: 3.5 km^{2} (1.4 mi^{2})
- Maximum length: 19 km (12 mi)
- Maximum water depth: 43 m (141 ft)
- Normal elevation: 322 m (1,056 ft)

Power Station
- Operator: Société Electrique de l'Our
- Commission date: 1963
- Turbines: 2 x 5.5 MW Francis-type
- Installed capacity: 11 MW
- Annual generation: 16 GWh

The Esch-sur-Sûre Dam is an arch dam on the River Sauer just upstream of Esch-sur-Sûre in the Wiltz canton of Luxembourg. The primary purpose of the dam and its reservoir, Upper Sûre Lake, is to provide municipal water supply and hydroelectric power generation. The dam is operated jointly by the Administration of Roads and Bridges and the Syndicate des Eaux du Barrage d'Esch-sur-Sûre (SEBES) while the power station is operated by Société Electrique de l'Our (SEO).

== Background ==
It was first conceived in the 1950s to help replace nature groundwater resources for the town of Esch-sur-Sûre. Using an André Coyne design, the dam was constructed between 1956 and 1957 and the power station was commissioned in 1963. The reservoir has been drained twice during the dam's life; once in 1969 to install a new fixed water intake and again in 1991 to install and adjustable-arm intake which mitigate issues with algae growth in the reservoir.

== Dam ==
The Esch-sur-Sûre is an arch dam with a height of 50 m (160 ft) and length of 170 m (560 ft). It is 1.5 m (4.9 ft) wide at its crest and 4.5 m (15 ft) wide at its base. The dam sits at the head of a 428 km^{2} (165 mi^{2}) catchment area and creates the Upper Sûre Lake which has a total volume of 59,000,000 m^{3} (48,000 acre⋅ft). The lake has a surface area of 3.5 km^{2} (1.4 mi^{2}) and is 19 km (12 mi) long. It is 43 m (141 ft) at it deepest point and the normal elevation is 322 m (1,056 ft).

== Power station ==
The power station at the base of the dam contains two 5.5 MW Francis turbine-generators for a total installed capacity of 11 MW. The power station generates an average of 16 GWh annually. Downstream of the dam there are three weirs fitted with Kaplan turbines with a total installed capacity of 550 kW.

== Spillway plans ==
The dam also provides for flood control but has no spillway. Currently, two bottom outlets with a 450 m^{3}/s (16,000 cu ft/s) discharge capacity pass floods through the reservoir. Floods in the 1990s highlighted the need for a spillway at the dam. A design for a chute spillway on the left abutment of the dam have been drafted but not implemented.

== See also ==
- Vianden Pumped Storage Plant
