= Heiderscheid =

Town in Luxembourg

Heiderscheid Heischent
- Former commune
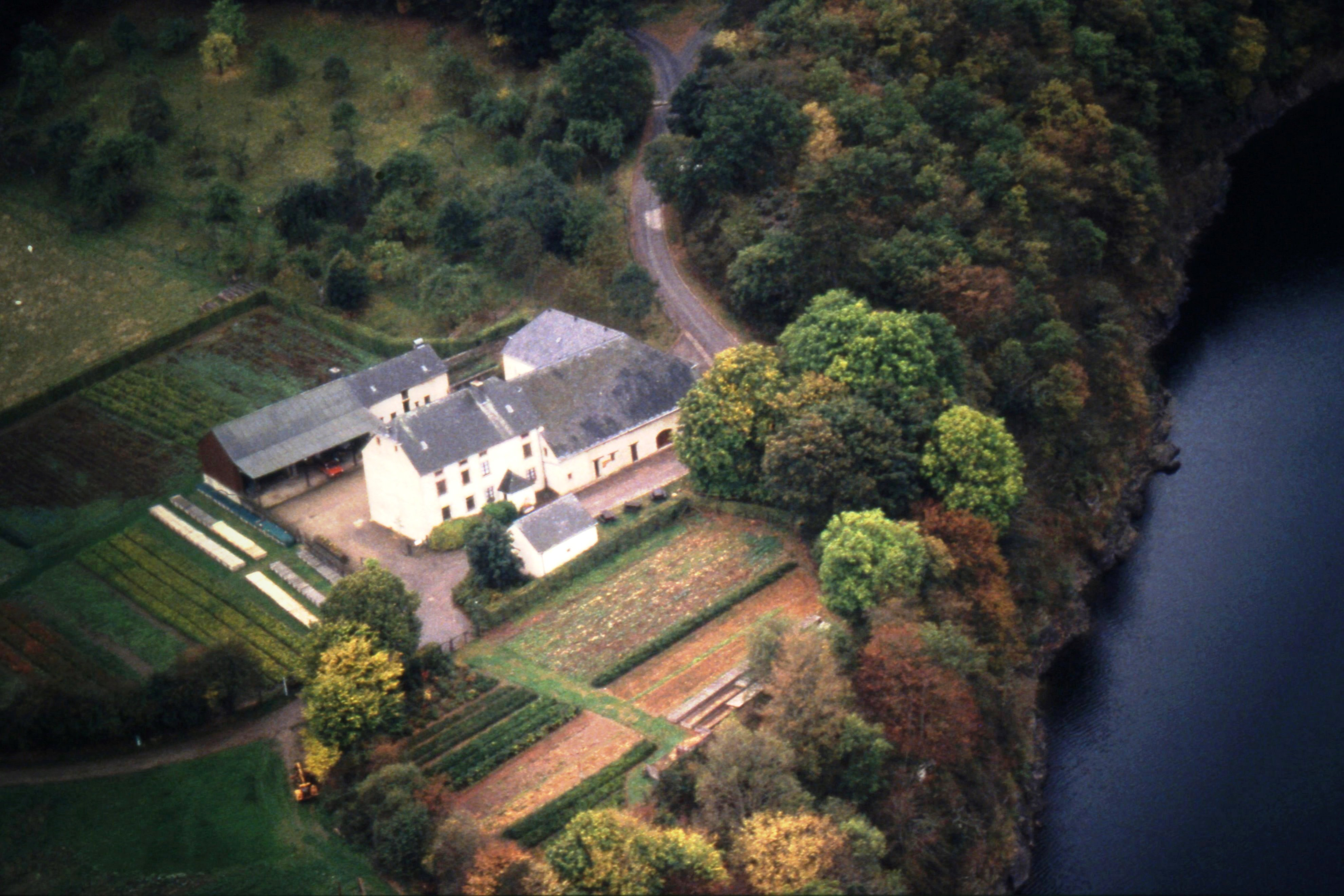
- Burfelt hamlet

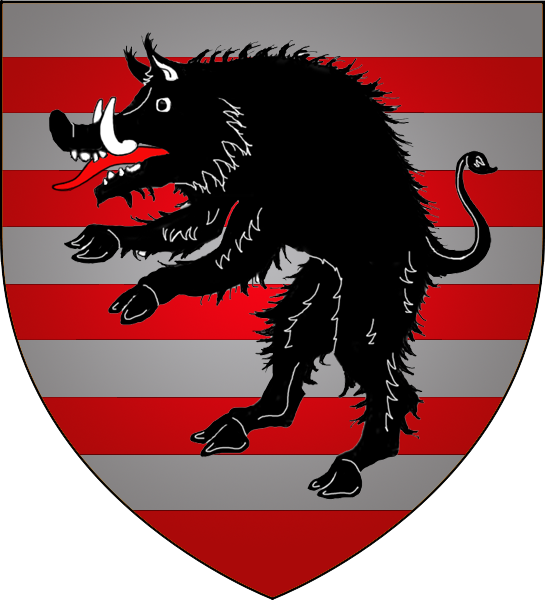
- Coat of arms

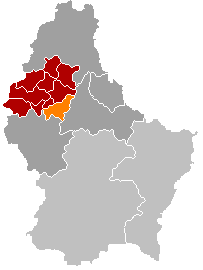
- Map of Luxembourg with Heiderscheid highlighted in orange, and the canton in dark red
- Coordinates: 49.887215°N 5.978499°E
- Country: Luxembourg
- Canton: Wiltz
- commune: Esch-sur-Sûre
- Time zone: UTC+1 (CET)
  - Summer (DST): UTC+2 (CEST)
- Website: heiderscheid.lu

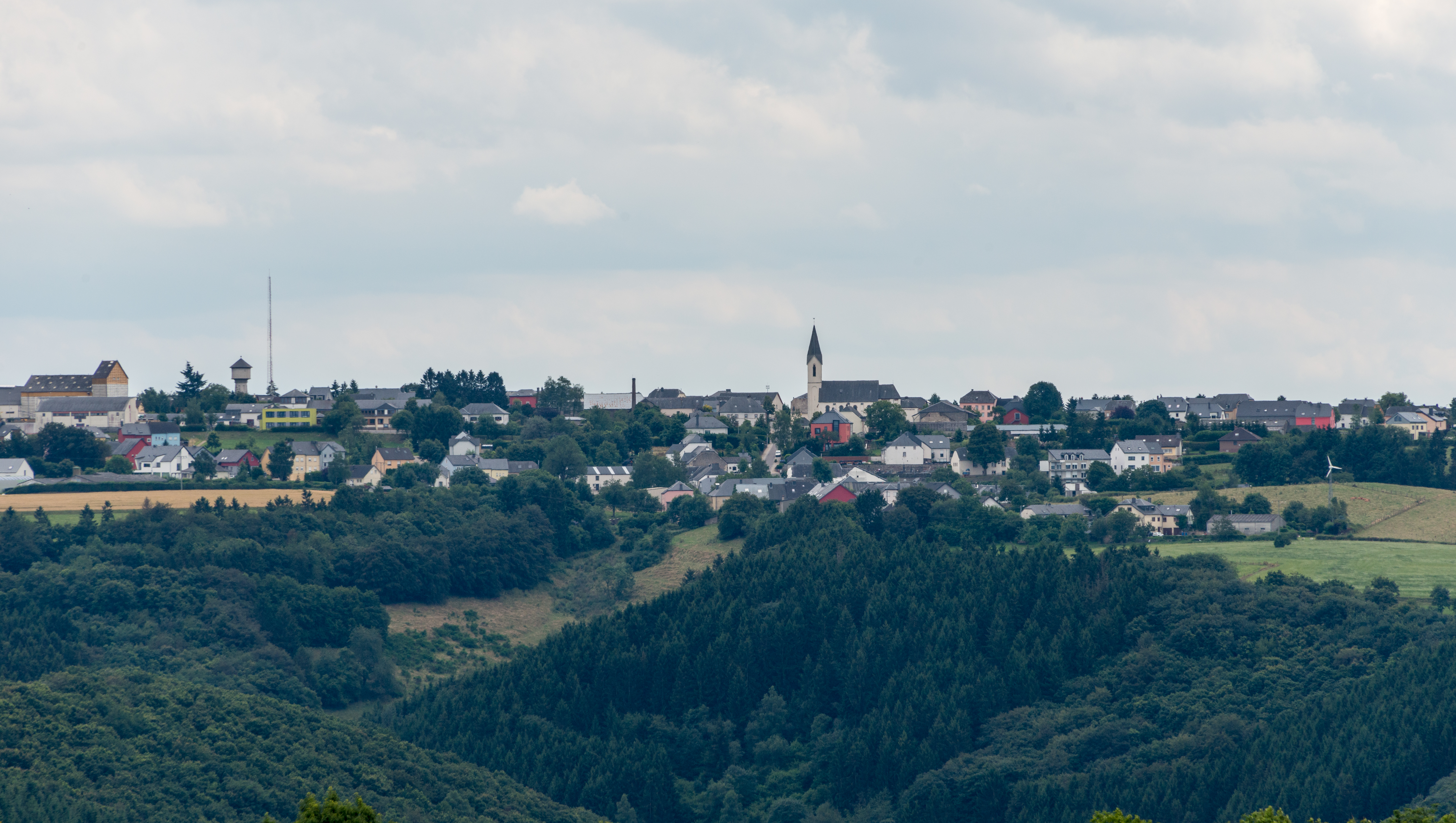
View of Heiderscheid

Heiderscheid (German pronunciation: [ˈhaɪdɐʃaɪt]; Luxembourgish: Heischent) is a small town in northwestern Luxembourg. It is part of the canton of Wiltz, which is part of the district of Diekirch.

It was previously its own commune but was merged into Esch-sur-Sûre (alongside Neunhausen) in 2011.

As of September 2026, the town of Heiderscheid had a population of 792.

== Former commune ==
The former commune consisted of the villages:

- Dirbach
- Eschdorf (former seat)
- Heiderscheid
- Fond de Heiderscheid
- Merscheid
- Ringel
- Tadler
- Hierheck (lieu-dit)

== Notable people ==
- Dr Michel Welter (1859 in Heiderscheid – 1924), a Luxembourgish politician, and former leader of the Luxembourg Socialist Workers' Party
- Marco Schank (born 1954 in Ettelbruck), a Luxembourgish politician, mayor of Heiderscheid (1994-2009) and Esch-sur-Sûre (since 2017)
