= 2021 Tour de Luxembourg =

2021 UCI Europe Tour 2021 UCI ProSeries

Race details
- Dates: 14 – 18 September 2021
- Stages: 5
- Distance: 724.5 km (450.2 mi)
- Winning time: 17h 20' 44"

Results
Jersey awarded to the overall winner	Winner	João Almeida (POR)	(Deceuninck–Quick-Step)
	Second	Marc Hirschi (SUI)	(UAE Team Emirates)
	Third	Mattia Cattaneo (ITA)	(Deceuninck–Quick-Step)
Jersey awarded to the points classification winner	Points	João Almeida (POR)	(Deceuninck–Quick-Step)
Jersey awarded to the mountains classification winner	Mountains	Kenny Molly (BEL)	(Bingoal Pauwels Sauces WB)
Jersey awarded to the youth classification winner	Youth	João Almeida (POR)	(Deceuninck–Quick-Step)
	Team	Deceuninck–Quick-Step	

The 2021 Tour de Luxembourg was the 81st edition of the Tour de Luxembourg road cycling stage race. It was held from 14 and 18 September, as part of the 2021 UCI Europe Tour and the 2021 UCI ProSeries.

== Teams ==
Eight UCI WorldTeams, twelve UCI ProTeams, and one UCI Continental team made up the twenty-one teams that participated in the race. Each team entered a squad of six riders. After a late non-starter from Uno-X Pro Cycling Team, a total of 125 riders started the race; 103 riders finished.

UCI WorldTeams

- AG2R Citroën Team
- Cofidis
- Deceuninck–Quick-Step
- Groupama–FDJ
- Lotto–Soudal
- Team BikeExchange
- Trek–Segafredo
- UAE Team Emirates

UCI ProTeams

- Alpecin–Fenix
- Arkéa–Samsic
- B&B Hotels p/b KTM
- Bingoal Pauwels Sauces WB
- Burgos BH
- Caja Rural–Seguros RGA
- Delko
- Rally Cycling
- Sport Vlaanderen–Baloise
- Team TotalEnergies
- Uno-X Pro Cycling Team
- Vini Zabù

UCI Continental Teams

- Leopard Pro Cycling

== Route ==
Stage characteristics and winners
Stage	Date	Course	Distance	Type	Winner
1	14 September	Luxembourg City (d'Coque) to Luxembourg City (Kirchberg)	140 km (87 mi)	Hilly stage	João Almeida (POR)
2	15 September	Steinfort to Esch-sur-Sûre (Eschdorf)	186.1 km (115.6 mi)	Mountain stage	Marc Hirschi (SUI)
3	16 September	Mondorf-les-Bains to Mamer	189.3 km (117.6 mi)	Hilly stage	Sacha Modolo (ITA)
4	17 September	Dudelange to Dudelange	25.4 km (15.8 mi)	Individual time trial	Mattia Cattaneo (ITA)
5	18 September	Mersch to Luxembourg City (Limpertsberg)	183.7 km (114.1 mi)	Hilly stage	David Gaudu (FRA)
Total			724.5 km (450.2 mi)		

== Stages ==
=== Stage 1 ===
14 September 2021 — Luxembourg City (d'Coque) to Luxembourg City (Kirchberg), 140 km (87 mi)

Stage 1 Result
Rank	Rider	Team	Time
1	João Almeida (POR)	Deceuninck–Quick-Step	4h 33' 36"
2	Bauke Mollema (NED)	Trek–Segafredo	+ 0"
3	Marc Hirschi (SUI)	UAE Team Emirates	+ 0"
4	Clément Champoussin (FRA)	AG2R Citroën Team	+ 0"
5	Nairo Quintana (COL)	Arkéa–Samsic	+ 0"
6	Jesús Herrada (ESP)	Cofidis	+ 0"
7	David Gaudu (FRA)	Groupama–FDJ	+ 0"
8	Andrea Vendrame (ITA)	AG2R Citroën Team	+ 0"
9	Thibaut Pinot (FRA)	Groupama–FDJ	+ 0"
10	Kobe Goossens (BEL)	Lotto–Soudal	+ 0"

General classification after Stage 1
Rank	Rider	Team	Time
1	João Almeida (POR)	Deceuninck–Quick-Step	4h 33' 36"
2	Bauke Mollema (NED)	Trek–Segafredo	+ 4"
3	Marc Hirschi (SUI)	UAE Team Emirates	+ 6"
4	Clément Champoussin (FRA)	AG2R Citroën Team	+ 10"
5	Nairo Quintana (COL)	Arkéa–Samsic	+ 10"
6	Jesús Herrada (ESP)	Cofidis	+ 10"
7	David Gaudu (FRA)	Groupama–FDJ	+ 10"
8	Andrea Vendrame (ITA)	AG2R Citroën Team	+ 10"
9	Thibaut Pinot (FRA)	Groupama–FDJ	+ 10"
10	Kobe Goossens (BEL)	Lotto–Soudal	+ 10"

=== Stage 2 ===
15 September 2021 — Steinfort to Esch-sur-Sûre (Eschdorf), 186.1 km (115.6 mi)

Stage 2 Result
Rank	Rider	Team	Time
1	Marc Hirschi (SUI)	UAE Team Emirates	4h 45' 12"
2	João Almeida (POR)	Deceuninck–Quick-Step	+ 8"
3	David Gaudu (FRA)	Groupama–FDJ	+ 8"
4	Davide Formolo (ITA)	UAE Team Emirates	+ 8"
5	David de la Cruz (ESP)	UAE Team Emirates	+ 8"
6	Thibaut Pinot (FRA)	Groupama–FDJ	+ 8"
7	Pierre Latour (FRA)	Team TotalEnergies	+ 20"
8	Sébastien Reichenbach (SUI)	Groupama–FDJ	+ 20"
9	Nairo Quintana (COL)	Arkéa–Samsic	+ 20"
10	Clément Champoussin (FRA)	AG2R Citroën Team	+ 20"

General classification after Stage 2
Rank	Rider	Team	Time
1	Marc Hirschi (SUI)	UAE Team Emirates	8h 01' 06"
2	João Almeida (POR)	Deceuninck–Quick-Step	+ 4"
3	David Gaudu (FRA)	Groupama–FDJ	+ 19"
4	Thibaut Pinot (FRA)	Groupama–FDJ	+ 23"
5	David de la Cruz (ESP)	UAE Team Emirates	+ 23"
6	Davide Formolo (ITA)	UAE Team Emirates	+ 23"
7	Nairo Quintana (COL)	Arkéa–Samsic	+ 33"
8	Bauke Mollema (NED)	Trek–Segafredo	+ 35"
9	Clément Champoussin (FRA)	AG2R Citroën Team	+ 35"
10	Jesús Herrada (ESP)	Cofidis	+ 35"

=== Stage 3 ===
16 September 2021 — Mondorf-les-Bains to Mamer, 189.3 km (117.6 mi)

Stage 3 Result
Rank	Rider	Team	Time
1	Sacha Modolo (ITA)	Alpecin–Fenix	4h 17' 47"
2	Benoît Cosnefroy (FRA)	AG2R Citroën Team	+ 0"
3	Eduard-Michael Grosu (ROU)	Delko	+ 0"
4	Edvald Boasson Hagen (NOR)	Team TotalEnergies	+ 0"
5	Andrea Vendrame (ITA)	AG2R Citroën Team	+ 0"
6	Clément Champoussin (FRA)	AG2R Citroën Team	+ 0"
7	Arne Marit (BEL)	Sport Vlaanderen–Baloise	+ 0"
8	Franck Bonnamour (FRA)	B&B Hotels p/b KTM	+ 0"
9	Manuel Peñalver (ESP)	Burgos BH	+ 0"
10	Arvid de Kleijn (NED)	Rally Cycling	+ 0"

General classification after Stage 3
Rank	Rider	Team	Time
1	Marc Hirschi (SUI)	UAE Team Emirates	12h 18' 53"
2	João Almeida (POR)	Deceuninck–Quick-Step	+ 4"
3	David Gaudu (FRA)	Groupama–FDJ	+ 19"
4	Thibaut Pinot (FRA)	Groupama–FDJ	+ 23"
5	David de la Cruz (ESP)	UAE Team Emirates	+ 23"
6	Davide Formolo (ITA)	UAE Team Emirates	+ 23"
7	Nairo Quintana (COL)	Arkéa–Samsic	+ 33"
8	Clément Champoussin (FRA)	AG2R Citroën Team	+ 35"
9	Jesús Herrada (ESP)	Cofidis	+ 35"
10	Pierre Latour (FRA)	Team TotalEnergies	+ 35"

=== Stage 4 ===
17 September 2021 — Dudelange to Dudelange, 25.4 km (15.8 mi) (ITT)

Stage 4 Result
Rank	Rider	Team	Time
1	Mattia Cattaneo (ITA)	Deceuninck–Quick-Step	30' 52"
2	João Almeida (POR)	Deceuninck–Quick-Step	+ 2"
3	Mattias Skjelmose Jensen (DEN)	Trek–Segafredo	+ 26"
4	David de la Cruz (ESP)	UAE Team Emirates	+ 35"
5	Pierre Latour (FRA)	Team TotalEnergies	+ 38"
6	Marc Hirschi (SUI)	UAE Team Emirates	+ 49"
7	Jack Bauer (NZL)	Team BikeExchange	+ 50"
8	Harry Sweeny (AUS)	Lotto–Soudal	+ 55"
9	Antonio Tiberi (ITA)	Trek–Segafredo	+ 55"
10	Vincenzo Nibali (ITA)	Trek–Segafredo	+ 57"

General classification after Stage 4
Rank	Rider	Team	Time
1	João Almeida (POR)	Deceuninck–Quick-Step	12h 49' 51"
2	Marc Hirschi (SUI)	UAE Team Emirates	+ 43"
3	Mattia Cattaneo (ITA)	Deceuninck–Quick-Step	+ 50"
4	David de la Cruz (ESP)	UAE Team Emirates	+ 52"
5	Pierre Latour (FRA)	Team TotalEnergies	+ 1' 07"
6	Thibaut Pinot (FRA)	Groupama–FDJ	+ 1' 21"
7	David Gaudu (FRA)	Groupama–FDJ	+ 1' 21"
8	Vincenzo Nibali (ITA)	Trek–Segafredo	+ 1' 32"
9	Davide Formolo (ITA)	UAE Team Emirates	+ 1' 36"
10	Jesús Herrada (ESP)	Cofidis	+ 1' 37"

=== Stage 5 ===
18 September 2021 — Mersch to Luxembourg City (Limpertsberg), 183.7 km (114.1 mi)

Stage 5 Result
Rank	Rider	Team	Time
1	David Gaudu (FRA)	Groupama–FDJ	4h 30' 59"
2	João Almeida (POR)	Deceuninck–Quick-Step	+ 0"
3	Pierre Latour (FRA)	Team TotalEnergies	+ 0"
4	Marc Hirschi (SUI)	UAE Team Emirates	+ 0"
5	Benoît Cosnefroy (FRA)	AG2R Citroën Team	+ 0"
6	Alex Kirsch (LUX)	Trek–Segafredo	+ 0"
7	Fausto Masnada (ITA)	Deceuninck–Quick-Step	+ 0"
8	Clément Champoussin (FRA)	AG2R Citroën Team	+ 0"
9	Jesús Herrada (ESP)	Cofidis	+ 0"
10	Oier Lazkano (ESP)	Caja Rural–Seguros RGA	+ 0"

General classification after Stage 5
Rank	Rider	Team	Time
1	João Almeida (POR)	Deceuninck–Quick-Step	17h 20' 44"
2	Marc Hirschi (SUI)	UAE Team Emirates	+ 46"
3	Mattia Cattaneo (ITA)	Deceuninck–Quick-Step	+ 1' 05"
4	David de la Cruz (ESP)	UAE Team Emirates	+ 1' 09"
5	Pierre Latour (FRA)	Team TotalEnergies	+ 1' 09"
6	David Gaudu (FRA)	Groupama–FDJ	+ 1' 17"
7	Thibaut Pinot (FRA)	Groupama–FDJ	+ 1' 27"
8	Jesús Herrada (ESP)	Cofidis	+ 1' 43"
9	Vincenzo Nibali (ITA)	Trek–Segafredo	+ 1' 49"
10	Davide Formolo (ITA)	UAE Team Emirates	+ 1' 53"

== Classification leadership table ==
Classification leadership by stage
Stage	Winner	General classification	Points classification	Mountains classification	Young rider classification	Team classification	Coureur le plus sympathique
1	João Almeida	João Almeida	João Almeida	Kenny Molly	João Almeida	Groupama–FDJ	Thibaut Pinot
2	Marc Hirschi	Marc Hirschi	João Almeida	Kenny Molly	Marc Hirschi	UAE Team Emirates	Bauke Mollema
3	Sacha Modolo	Marc Hirschi	João Almeida	Kenny Molly	Marc Hirschi	UAE Team Emirates	Vincenzo Nibali
4	Mattia Cattaneo	João Almeida	João Almeida	Kenny Molly	João Almeida	Deceuninck–Quick-Step	Nairo Quintana
5	David Gaudu	João Almeida	João Almeida	Kenny Molly	João Almeida	Deceuninck–Quick-Step	Ben Gastauer
Final		João Almeida	João Almeida	Kenny Molly	João Almeida	Deceuninck–Quick-Step	Not awarded

- On stage 2, Bauke Mollema, who was second in the points classification, wore the cyan jersey, because first-placed João Almeida wore the yellow jersey as the leader of the general classification. For the same reason, Marc Hirschi will wear the cyan jersey on stage 5.
- On stage 2, Marc Hirschi, who was second in the young rider classification, wore the white jersey, because first-placed João Almeida wore the yellow jersey as the leader of the general classification.
- On stages 3 and 4, David Gaudu, who was third in the young rider classification, wore the white jersey, because first-placed Marc Hirschi wore the yellow jersey as the leader of the general classification and second-placed João Almeida wore the cyan jersey as the leader of the points classification. Gaudu continued to wear the white jersey on stage 5, but with Hirschi and Almeida having exchanged leader's jerseys.

== Final classification standings ==
Legend
Denotes the winner of the general classification	Denotes the winner of the mountains classification
Denotes the winner of the points classification	Denotes the winner of the young rider classification

=== General classification ===
Final general classification (1–10)
Rank	Rider	Team	Time
1	João Almeida (POR)	Deceuninck–Quick-Step	17h 20' 44"
2	Marc Hirschi (SUI)	UAE Team Emirates	+ 46"
3	Mattia Cattaneo (ITA)	Deceuninck–Quick-Step	+ 1' 05"
4	David de la Cruz (ESP)	UAE Team Emirates	+ 1' 09"
5	Pierre Latour (FRA)	Team TotalEnergies	+ 1' 09"
6	David Gaudu (FRA)	Groupama–FDJ	+ 1' 17"
7	Thibaut Pinot (FRA)	Groupama–FDJ	+ 1' 27"
8	Jesús Herrada (ESP)	Cofidis	+ 1' 43"
9	Vincenzo Nibali (ITA)	Trek–Segafredo	+ 1' 49"
10	Davide Formolo (ITA)	UAE Team Emirates	+ 1' 53"

=== Points classification ===
Final points classification (1–10)
Rank	Rider	Team	Points
1	João Almeida (POR)	Deceuninck–Quick-Step	68
2	Marc Hirschi (SUI)	UAE Team Emirates	51
3	David Gaudu (FRA)	Groupama–FDJ	38
4	Pierre Latour (FRA)	Team TotalEnergies	27
5	Benoît Cosnefroy (FRA)	AG2R Citroën Team	25
6	Clément Champoussin (FRA)	AG2R Citroën Team	22
7	Mattia Cattaneo (ITA)	Deceuninck–Quick-Step	20
8	Sacha Modolo (ITA)	Alpecin–Fenix	20
9	David de la Cruz (ESP)	UAE Team Emirates	20
10	Mattias Skjelmose Jensen (DEN)	Trek–Segafredo	13

=== Mountains classification ===
Final mountains classification (1–10)
Rank	Rider	Team	Points
1	Kenny Molly (BEL)	Bingoal Pauwels Sauces WB	42
2	Sebastian Schönberger (AUT)	B&B Hotels p/b KTM	20
3	Kenneth Van Rooy (BEL)	Sport Vlaanderen–Baloise	8
4	Ben O'Connor (AUS)	AG2R Citroën Team	8
5	Morten Hulgaard (DEN)	Uno-X Pro Cycling Team	8
6	Otto Vergaerde (BEL)	Alpecin–Fenix	7
7	Ben King (USA)	Rally Cycling	6
8	Adam de Vos (CAN)	Rally Cycling	5
9	Alex Kirsch (LUX)	Trek–Segafredo	4
10	Kamil Gradek (POL)	Vini Zabù	4

=== Young rider classification ===
Final young rider classification (1–10)
Rank	Rider	Team	Time
1	João Almeida (POR)	Deceuninck–Quick-Step	17h 20' 44"
2	Marc Hirschi (SUI)	UAE Team Emirates	+ 46"
3	David Gaudu (FRA)	Groupama–FDJ	+ 1' 17"
4	Clément Champoussin (FRA)	AG2R Citroën Team	+ 1' 57"
5	Kobe Goossens (BEL)	Lotto–Soudal	+ 2' 11"
6	Oier Lazkano (ESP)	Caja Rural–Seguros RGA	+ 2' 24"
7	Attila Valter (HUN)	Groupama–FDJ	+ 3' 36"
8	Jan Maas (NED)	Leopard Pro Cycling	+ 4' 01"
9	Kevin Colleoni (ITA)	Team BikeExchange	+ 8' 43"
10	Fernando Barceló (ESP)	Cofidis	+ 12' 30"

=== Team classification ===
Final team classification (1–10)
Rank	Team	Time
1	Deceuninck–Quick-Step	52h 05' 48"
2	UAE Team Emirates	+ 30"
3	Groupama–FDJ	+ 1' 08"
4	Trek–Segafredo	+ 7' 20"
5	AG2R Citroën Team	+ 12' 07"
6	Cofidis	+ 17' 45"
7	Team BikeExchange	+ 20' 09"
8	Arkéa–Samsic	+ 24' 59"
9	Uno-X Pro Cycling Team	+ 27' 30"
10	Delko	+ 28' 16"
