= Neunhausen =

Neunhausen Néngsen
- Former commune
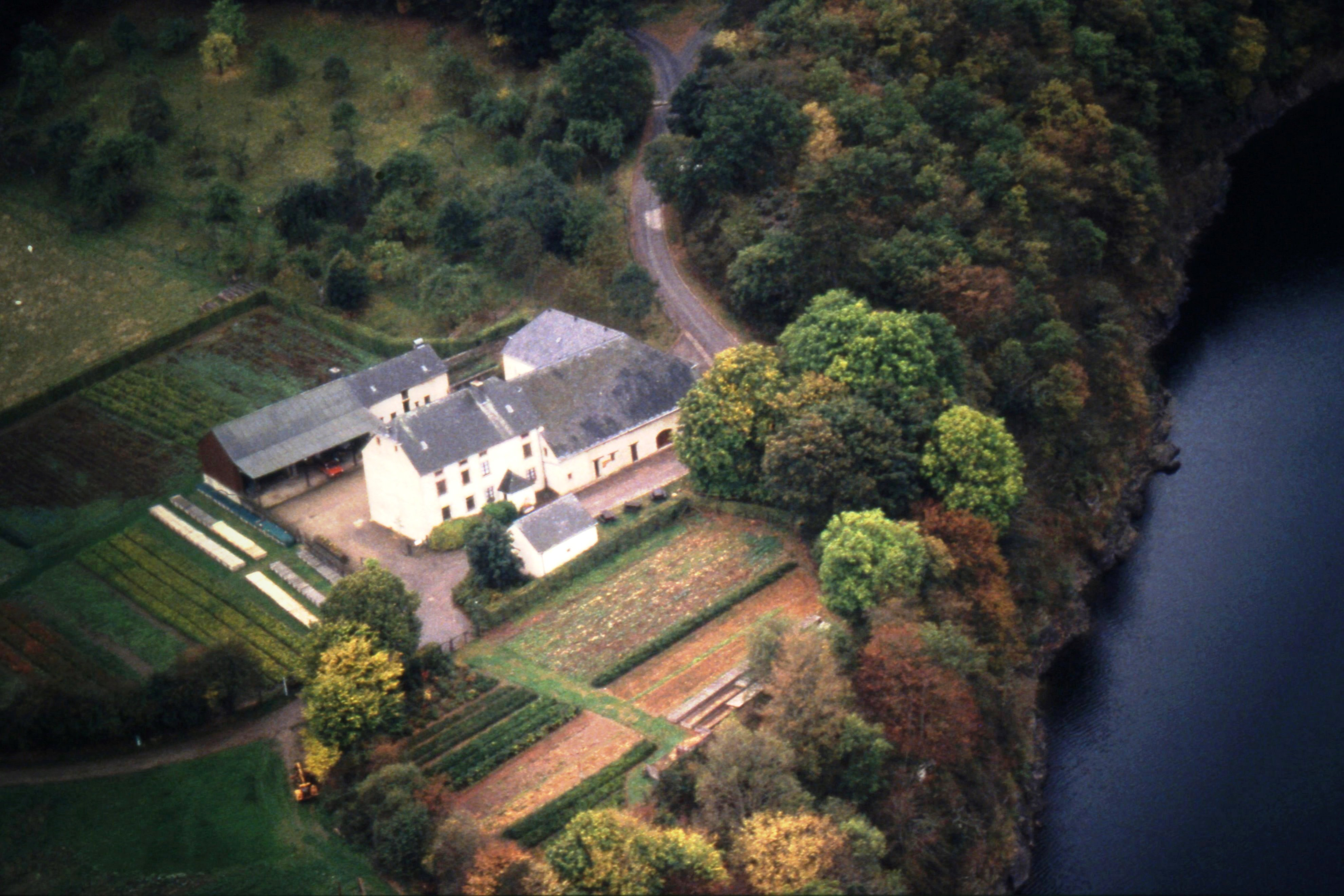
- Burfelt hamlet

- Coat of arms

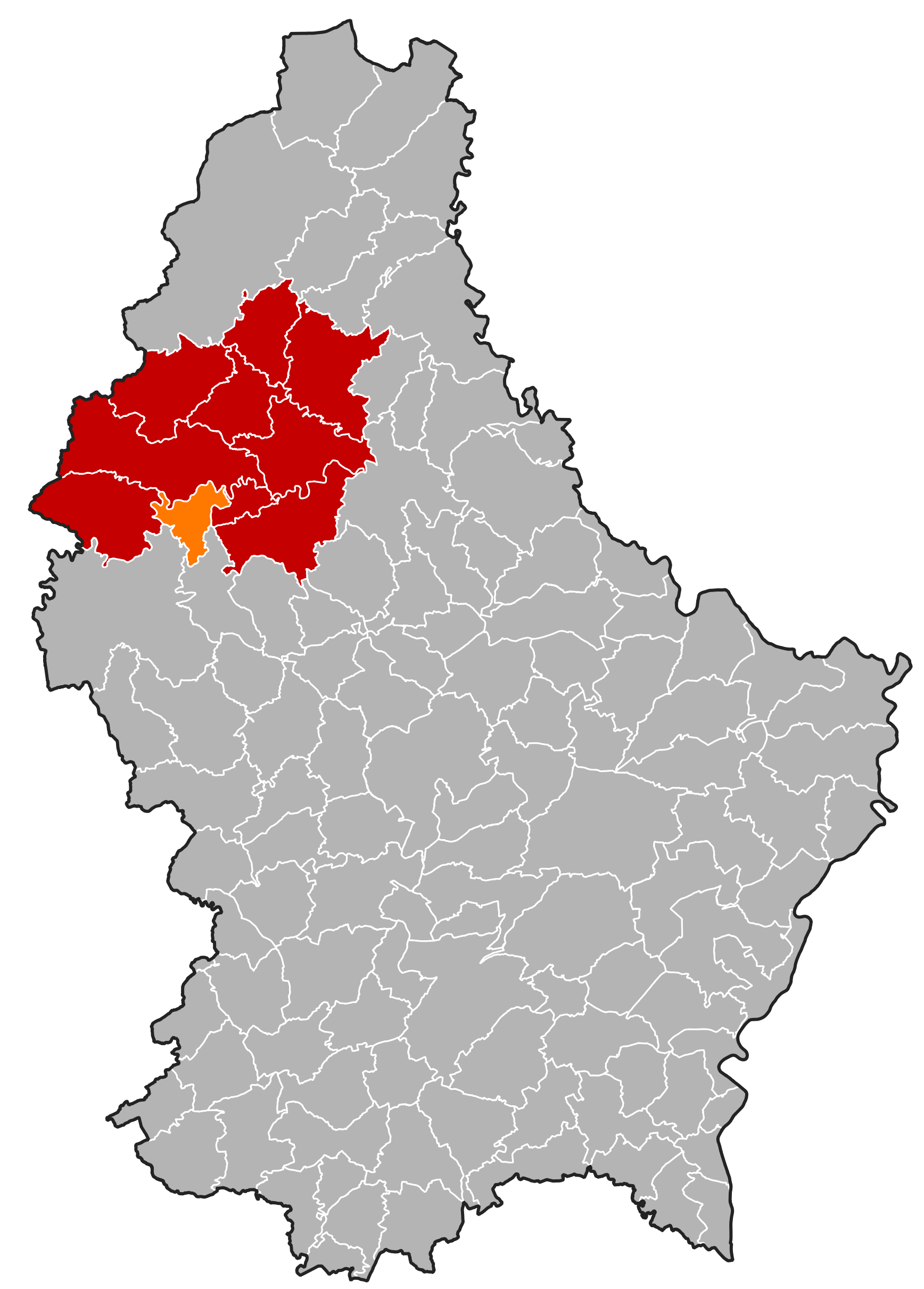
- Map of Luxembourg with Neunhausen highlighted in orange, and the canton in dark red
- Coordinates: 49.8766667°N 5.8855556°E
- Country: Luxembourg
- Canton: Wiltz
- Commune: Esch-sur-Sûre
- Time zone: UTC+1 (CET)
  - Summer (DST): UTC+2 (CEST)
- Website: neunhausen.lu

Neunhausen (German pronunciation: [ˈnɔʏnˌhaʊzn̩]; Luxembourgish: Néngsen [ˈneŋzən]) is a village and former commune in north-western Luxembourg. It is part of the canton of Wiltz, which is part of the district of Diekirch.

It was a separate commune – the smallest in Luxembourg in terms of both population and population density – until it was merged into Esch-sur-Sûre (alongside Heiderscheid) in 2011.

As of September 2026, the village of Neunhausen had a population of 251.

== Former commune ==
The former commune consisted of the villages:

- Bonnal (former seat)
- Insenborn
- Lultzhausen
- Neunhausen
- Bourgfried (lieu-dit)
