= Bonnal =

Bonnal can refer to:

- Bonnal, Luxembourg
- Bonnal, Doubs, France
- Joseph-Ermend Bonnal
