= Mary Clement =

Luxembourgish-born American serial poisoner

- Born: Marie Clément; February 16, 1863; Harlange, Wiltz, Luxembourg
- Died: July 9, 1944 (aged 81); United States
- Other names: Mary Kleman; Mary Klemann; Mary Clayman; Mary Klaman; Mary Clemens
- Conviction: Attempted murder
- Penalty: One year imprisonment

Details
- Victims: 4
- Span of crimes: 1880–1885
- Country: United States
- State: Iowa
- Date apprehended: June 1885

Marie "Mary" Clement (February 16, 1863 – July 9, 1944), also known under several aliases, was a Luxembourgish-born American serial killer who poisoned her parents and two of her sisters at their home in Dubuque, Iowa. Although never charged in their deaths on the grounds that she was insane at the time, she was later convicted of attempting to poison her sister's family in Rose Hill, Illinois and sentenced to a year in the Joliet Prison.

== Biography ==
Mary was born in Harlange, Luxembourg to parents Michel and Margarite (née Deville) Clément, the second of five daughters. In 1871, the whole family immigrated to the United States, settling in Dubuque, where three years later, the last daughter, Annie, would be born. Mary was frequently described as slender, rather pretty and prepossessing in manner, but due to a defect in her spinal column, had only partial control over her legs and feet.

== Murders ==
Beginning in 1880, the little sister Annie was suddenly seized with convulsions and died shortly after, her death later being attributed to eating too much before going to bed. During the following years, her parents and sister Lena died in similar circumstances, all them passing away from convulsions or heart failure after suffering through an unidentifiable illness:

- Annie (6), on August 1, 1880
- Margarite (54), on July 24, 1884
- Lena (13), on August 9, 1884
- Michel (49), on March 28, 1885

== Freres poisonings ==
Two months following the burial of her father in Dubuque, Mary moved in with her sister Catherine, her husband Michel "Michael" Freres and their two children in Rose Hill. On several occasions, she cooked meals for the family, and each time, they would be overtaken by violent vomiting and spasms. Michael eventually grew suspicious of Mary, as she always refused to eat any of the soup she served.

One day, he found a pack of grayish-colored powder in his backyard, and after eating some soup in the afternoon and vomiting, he noticed a sediment in his plate that looked like the mysterious powder. Upon further examination, he found more of the substance in his wife and the children's plates. Puzzled, he brought the powder and the plates for an analysis in Evanston, with the attending physicians, Dr. Isaac Poole and Professor H. S. Corbart, revealing that the powder contained arsenic. Following this discovery, Mary Clement was arrested shortly after.

== Trial and sentence ==
While imprisoned, Mary initially vehemently protested that she was innocent, crying uncontrollably for two days and claiming that her sister had accused her for the sole reason of obtaining some $100, which Clement supposedly had. However, when later questioned by a reporter, she confessed not only to poisoning the Frereses, but also killing her mother, father and sister. Mary said that she had suddenly been overtaken by a feeling to end her ailing mother's misery, before eventually doing the same to her sister and father. When asked if money was the motive, she retaliated by claiming that she "hated the money" and had spent it quickly to get rid of it, before experiencing a hysterical fit in which she threw herself at her cot and demanded to see a priest.

Two days after, she was interviewed by a Dr. Bluthardt, and during said interview, Mary claimed to have never made the confession or that if she did, she remembered nothing of it. When later asked if he thought that Clement was insane, Bluthardt denied it, instead saying that she suffered from several disorders that made her extremely nervous and sensitive.

At her trial, Clement observed the procedure closely, but did it so unnaturally calmly and expressed nervousness so rarely, that even the press remarked how out of character it was. Despite this, with Michael Freres as the main witness and the several people who presented that there was evidence of arsenic poisoning, Mary Clement was quickly sentenced to a year in jail by the jury. The following month, she wrote a letter confessing to her crimes, including her youngest sister's murder, shocking associates who still considered her innocent. In it, she also expressed her pleasure with the short sentence. Clement was not prosecuted for the murder on the grounds that she as insane at the time.

== Later life and death ==
After her release, Clement moved out to Los Angeles to work as a domestic servant for a wealthy family. According to the family members, she never talked about her past, but was known as a nice old lady who liked to wear elaborate hats. Mary Clement died at the age of 81, and was later buried at St. Henry's Church in Chicago, in the Freres family plot.

== See also ==
- List of serial killers in the United States
