= Insenborn =

Coordinates: 49°54′N 5°53′E

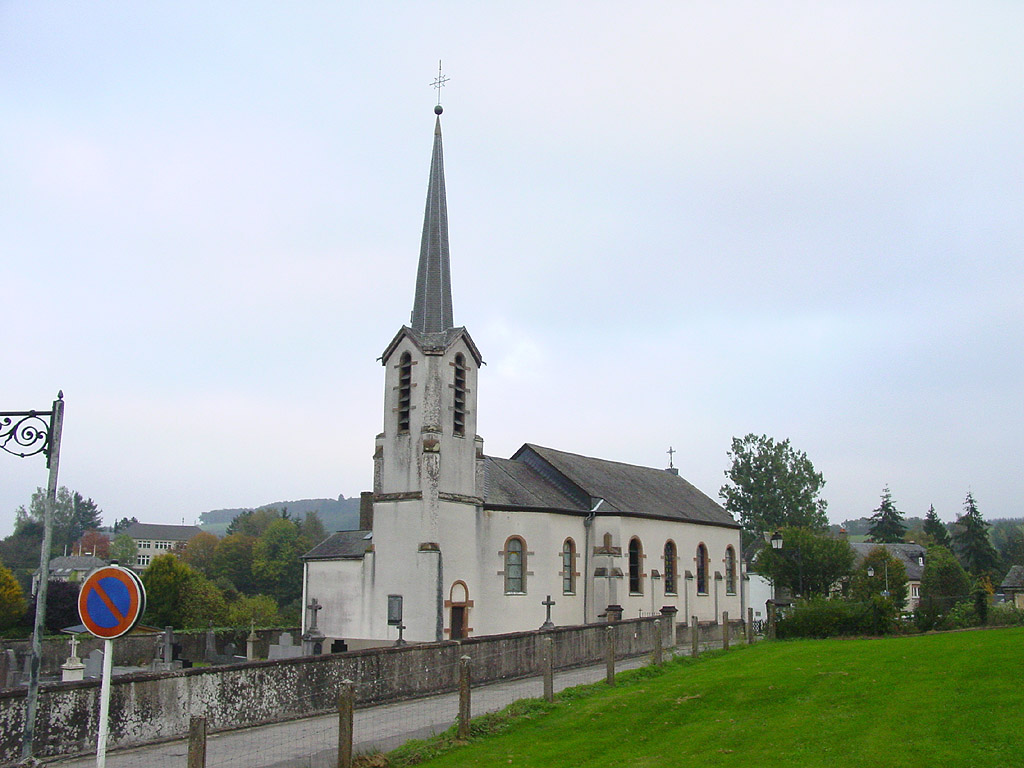
Insenborn church

Insenborn (German pronunciation: [ˈɪnzn̩ˌbɔʁn]; Luxembourgish: Ënsber) is a village in the commune of Esch-sur-Sûre, in north-western Luxembourg. As of September 2026, the village had a population of 222.

== Geography ==
Insenborn lies on the south bank of the Upper Sûre Lake, which is an artificial lake created by the damming of the Sauer river.

== Worth a look ==
Insenborn Church
