= Esch-sur-Sûre Castle =

Coordinates: 49°54′40″N 05°56′05″E

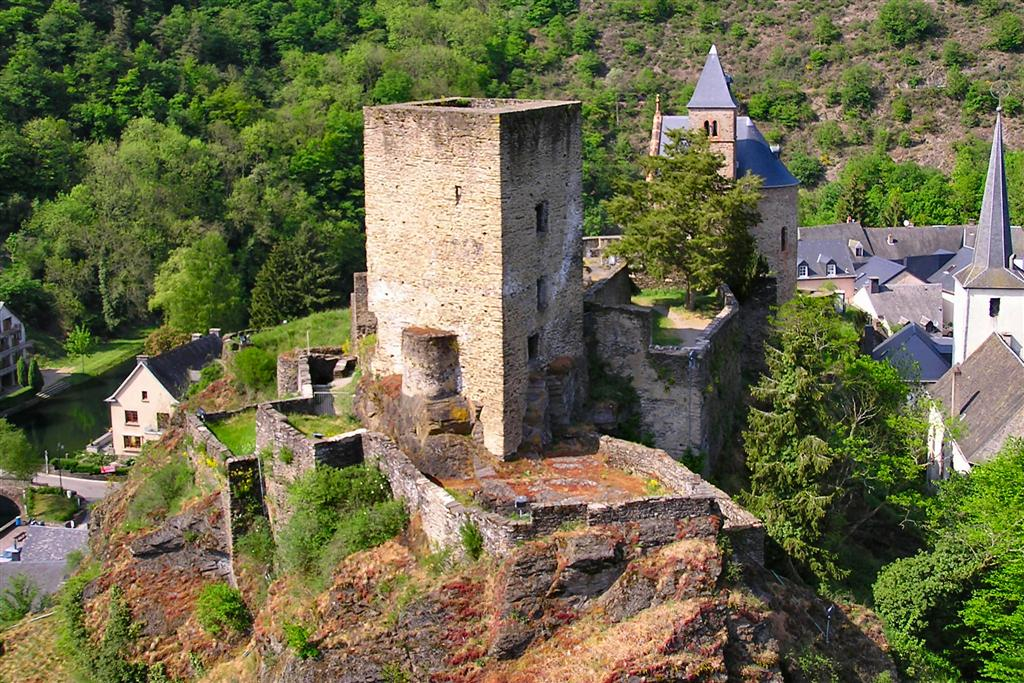
Esch-sur-Sûre Castle

Esch-sur-Sûre Castle (Luxembourgish: Buerg Esch-Sauer; French: Château d'Esch-sur-Sûre; German: Burg Esch-Sauer), now a ruin, is located on a spur in the small town of Esch-sur-Sûre in the north-west of Luxembourg. It is naturally protected by a sharp meander in the River Sûre which surrounds the town and the castle on three sides.

== History ==
In 927, a certain Meginaud or Maingaud and his wife Hiletrude acquired the site of Esch-sur-Sûre where he built a Romanesque tower eight metres square as well as farm buildings. The castle was considerably enlarged in the Gothic style by the two last Counts of Esch during the 13th century.

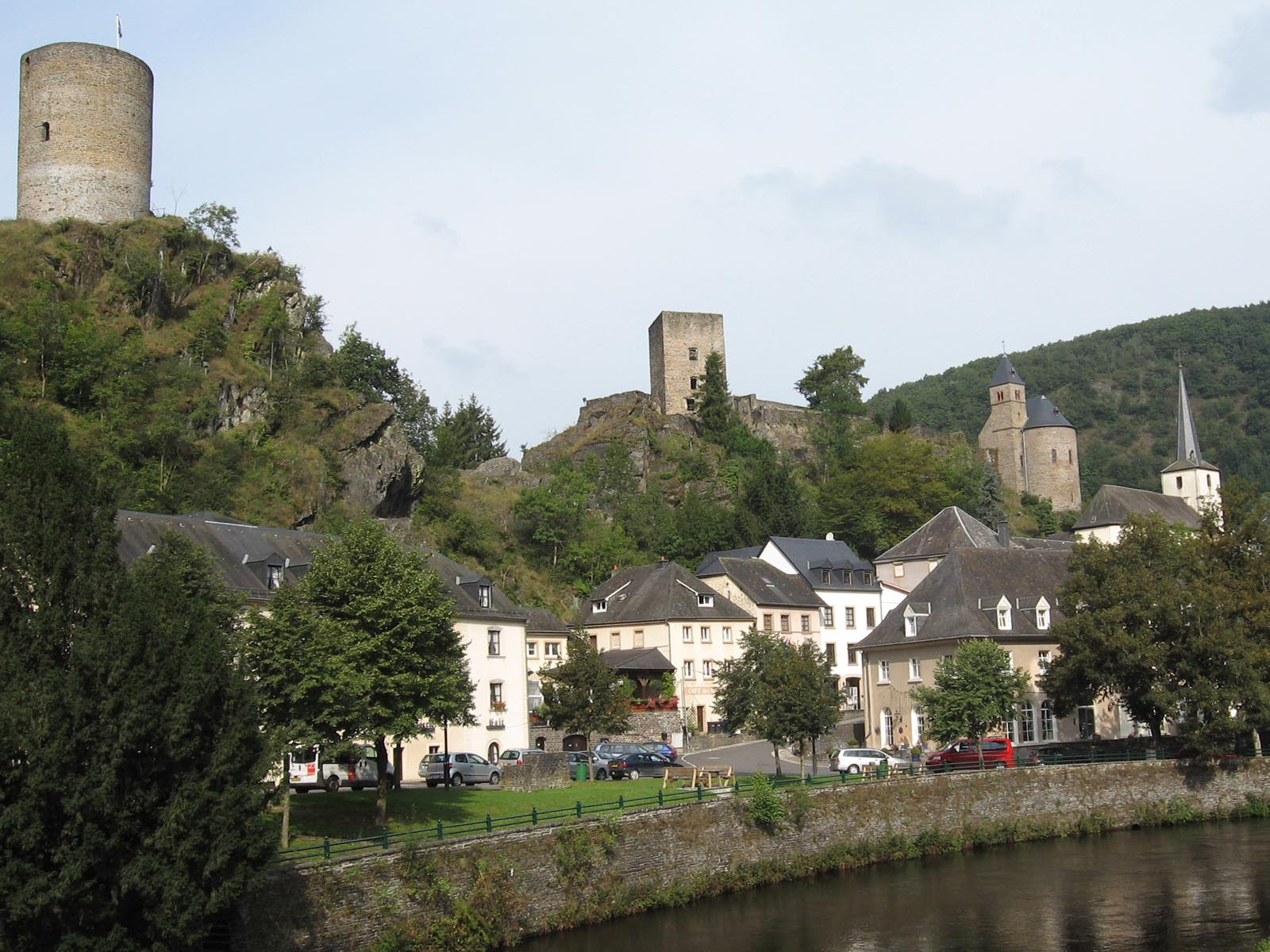
The Castle above the town

With the introduction of gunpowder in the 15th century, additional defences were required. The entire village was reinforced with a solid wall stretching 450 metres around the village complete with two defensive towers. The round watchtower or Lochturm opposite the keep was also built in the 15th century as were the entrance gate and the castle stables. The castle started to deteriorate in the middle of the 16th century and was dismantled in 1685 by the troops of Louis XIV. The outer wall was however left intact as many of the houses used it for their back walls. The castle fell into the hands of commoners. When Victor Hugo visited the village in 1871, several families were still living there. In 1902, the Egyptian Martin Riano d’Hutzt bought the ruins from the State for 1,000 francs. He charged the architect Charles Arendt with restoration work and the chapel was restored in 1906 but then funds appear to have run out.

== The castle today ==
Today only the ruins of the castle remain although the State acquired the site in 2005 and began restoration work the following year. The site is open to the public and is illuminated in the evenings.

== See also ==
- List of castles in Luxembourg
