= Lac de la Haute-Sûre =

Lac de la Haute-Sûre Stauséigemeng
- Commune
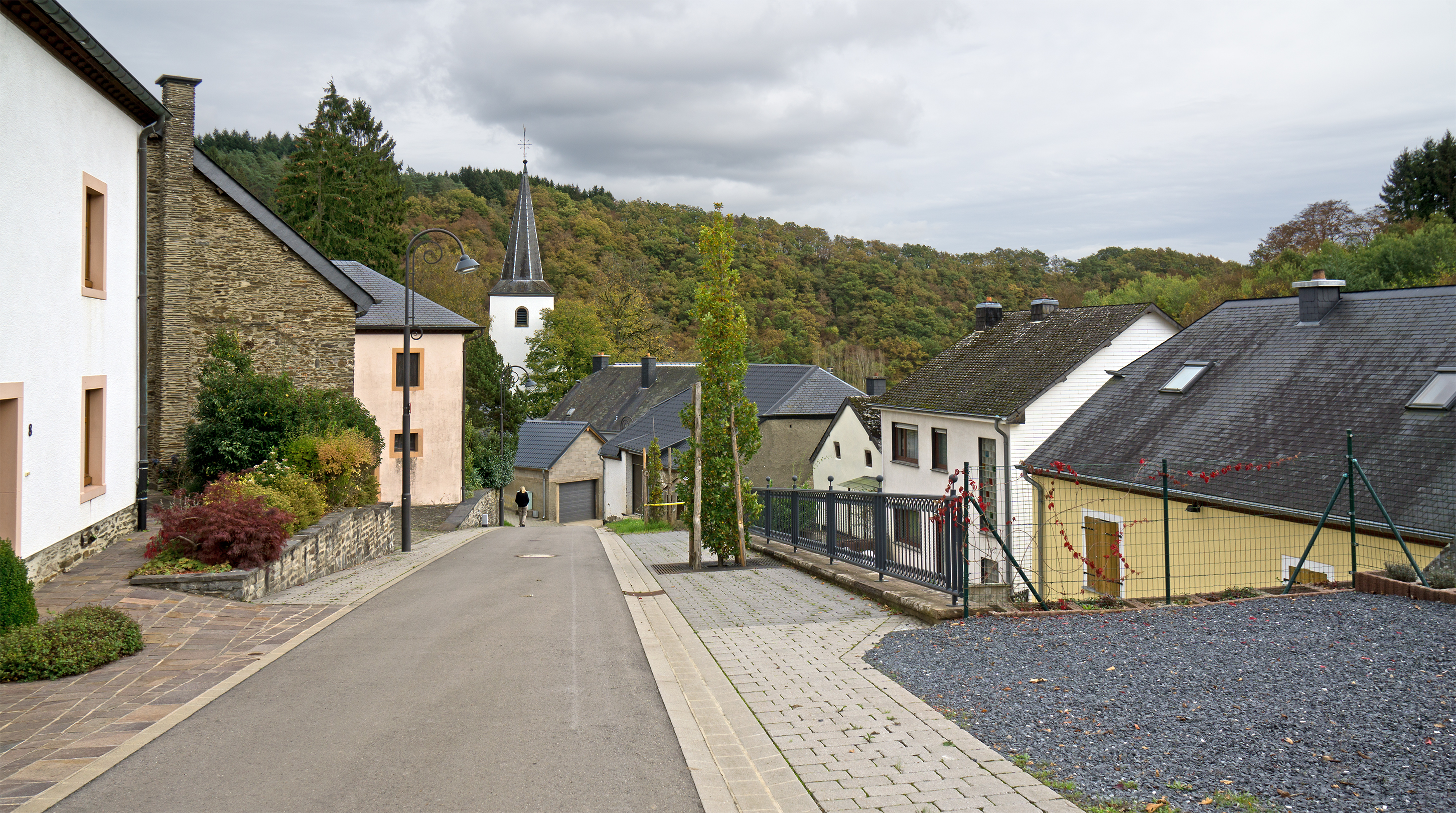

- Coat of arms

- Map of Luxembourg with Lac de la Haute-Sûre highlighted in orange, and the canton in dark red
- Coordinates: 49.92°N 5.8469°E
- Country: Luxembourg
- Canton: Wiltz

Government
  - Mayor: Marco Koeune

Area
  - Total: 48.5 km^{2} (18.7 sq mi)
  - Rank: 10th of 100
- Highest elevation: 537 m (1,762 ft)
  - Rank: 7th of 100
- Lowest elevation: 284 m (932 ft)
  - Rank: 86th of 100

Population (2025)
  - Total: 2,325
  - Rank: 74th of 100
  - Density: 47.9/km^{2} (124/sq mi)
  - Rank: 97th of 100
- Time zone: UTC+1 (CET)
  - Summer (DST): UTC+2 (CEST)
- LAU 2: LU0000806
- Website: lac-haute-sure.lu

Lac de la Haute-Sûre (French pronunciation: [lak də la ot syʁ]; Luxembourgish: Stauséigemeng; German: Stauseegemeinde, pronounced [ˈʃtaʊzeːɡəˌmaɪndə]) is a commune in the canton of Wiltz, in north-western Luxembourg. The commune is named after the Upper Sûre Lake, a reservoir on the upper Sauer river. Its administrative centre is Bavigne.

Lac de la Haute-Sûre was formed on 1 January 1979 from the former communes of Harlange and Mecher, both in Wiltz canton. The law creating Lac de la Haute-Sûre was passed on 23 December 1978.

In mid-2025, formal talks were launched between Lac de la Haute-Sûre and neighbouring Boulaide for a future merger of the two communes, with a referendum on the matter planned to be held before the 2029 communal elections. If successful, the merger would created the third largest commune in Luxembourg, after Wincrange and Clervaux.

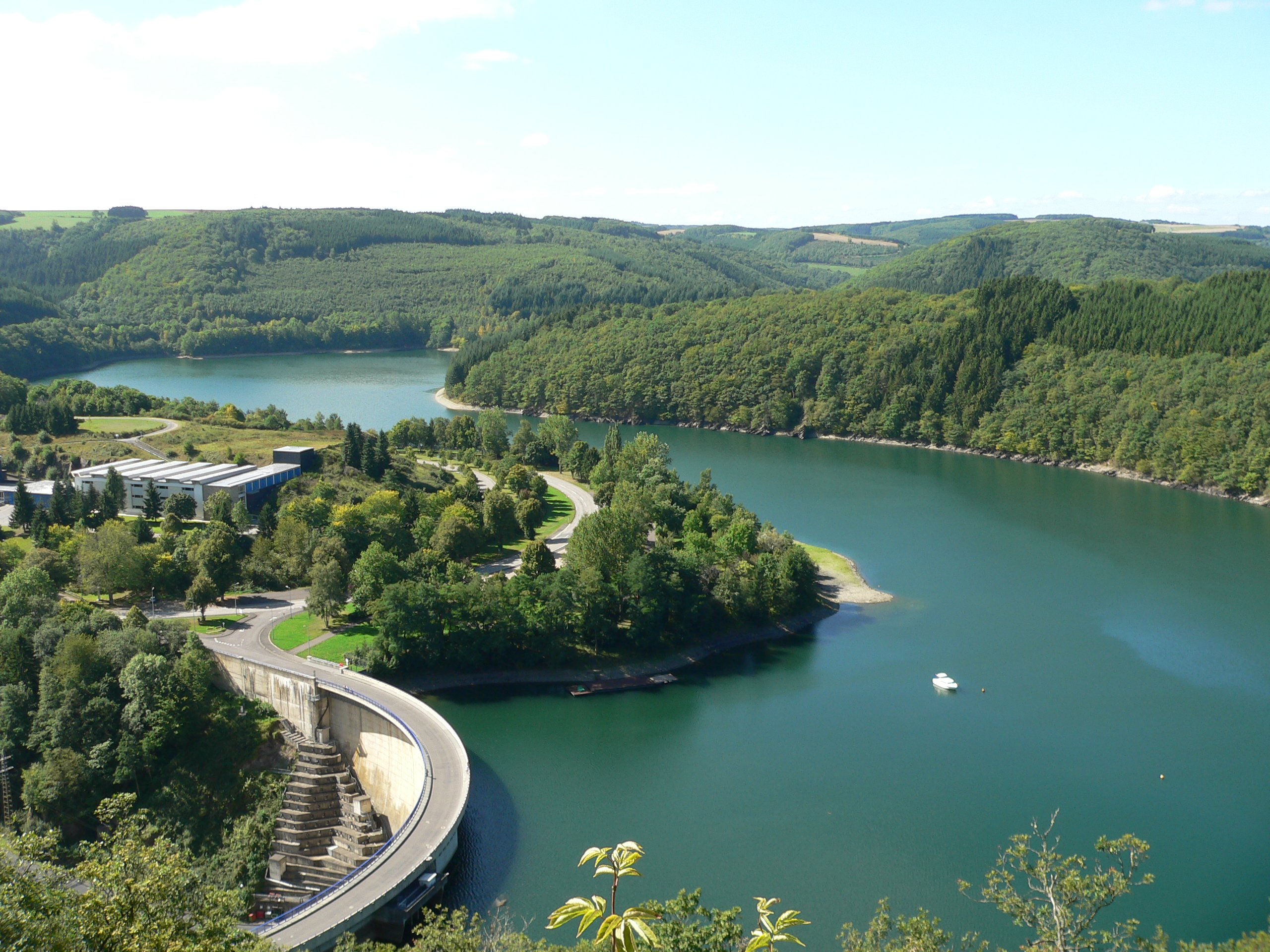
The Upper Sûre Lake, after which the commune is named

== Populated places ==
The commune consists of the following villages:

Harlange Section:

- Harlange
- Tarchamps
- Watrange

Mecher Section:

- Bavigne
- Kaundorf
- Liefrange
- Mecher
- Nothum
- Dénkert (Dünkrodt) (lieu-dit)
- Schumannseck (lieu-dit)

== Population ==
Historical population

Year	Pop.	±%
1821	1,522	—
1851	2,526	+66.0%
1900	1,906	−24.5%
1910	1,951	+2.4%
1922	1,830	−6.2%
1935	1,773	−3.1%

Year	Pop.	±%
1947	1,506	−15.1%
1960	1,225	−18.7%
1970	1,088	−11.2%
1981	1,006	−7.5%
1990	1,094	+8.7%
2000	1,282	+17.2%

Year	Pop.	±%
2005	1,464	+14.2%
2010	1,575	+7.6%
2015	1,707	+8.4%
2020	2,013	+17.9%
2021	2,084	+3.5%

Source data
