= Upper Sûre Natural Park =

Nature park in Luxembourg

- Lac de la Haute-Sûre
- IUCN category VI (protected area with sustainable use of natural resources)
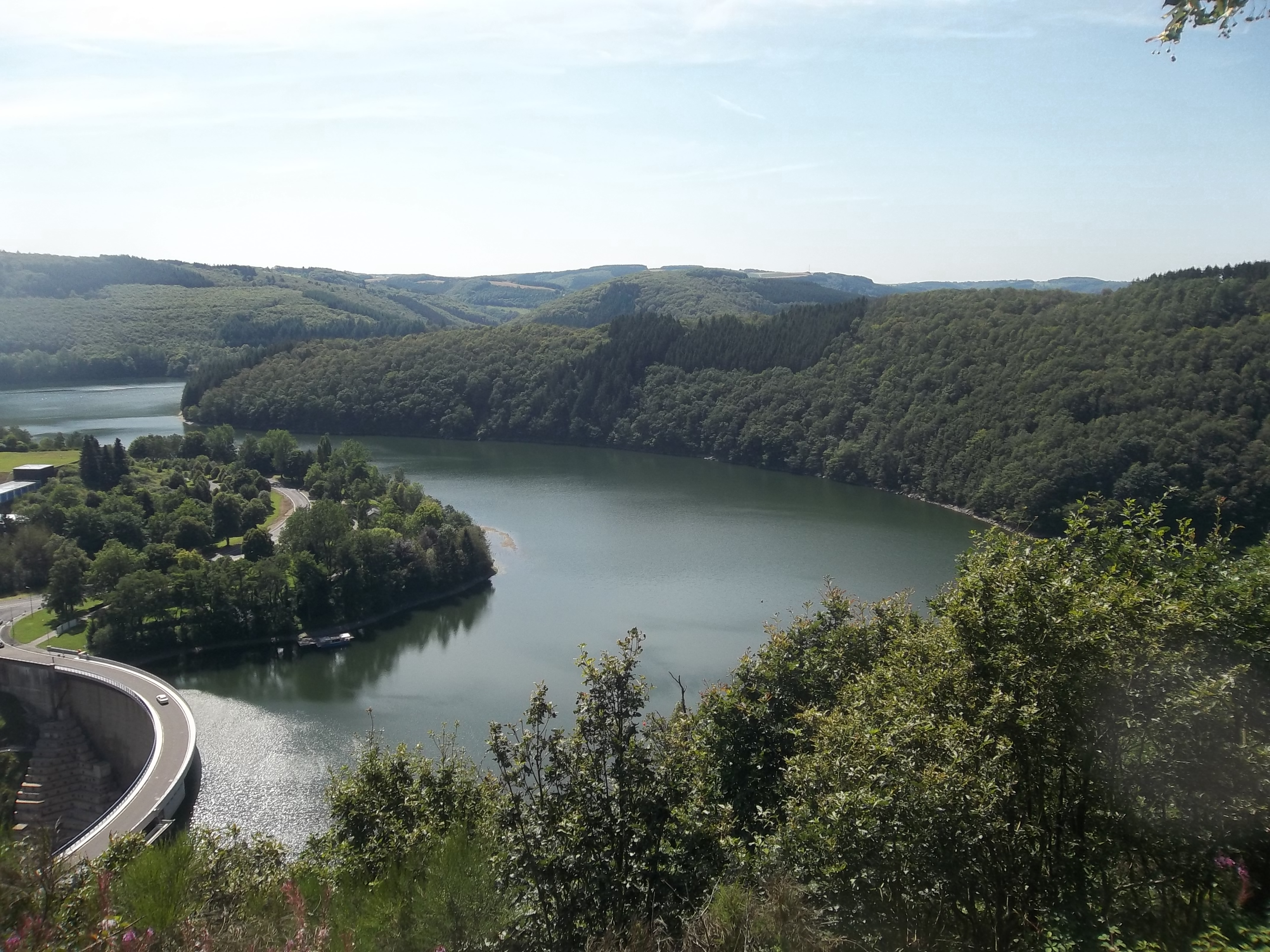
- View across Upper Sûre Lake

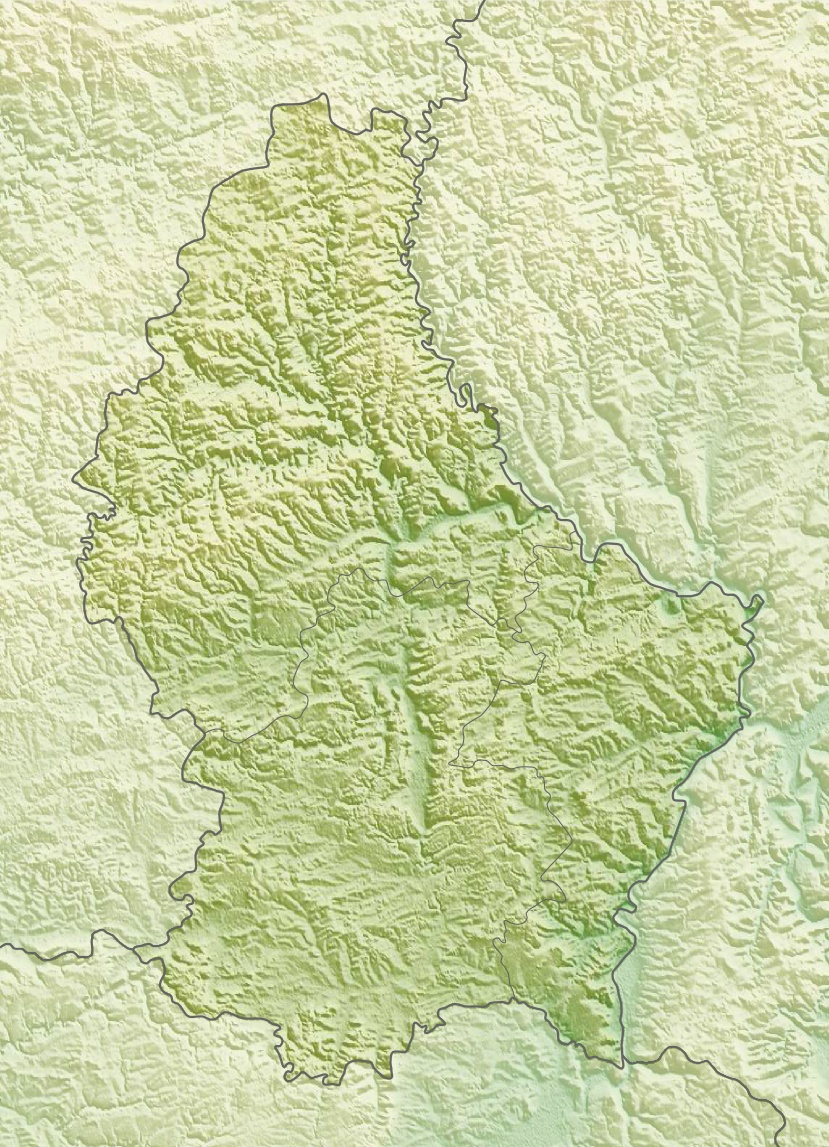
- Location within Luxembourg
- Interactive map of Upper Sûre Natural Park
- Location: Luxembourg
- Coordinates: 49°54′N 5°52′E
- Area: 154.75 km^{2} (59.75 sq mi)
- Created: 2021
- Website: naturpark-our.lu

Ramsar Wetland
- Official name: Vallée de la Haute-Sûre
- Designated: 8 March 2004
- Reference no.: 1408

The Upper Sûre Natural Park (Luxembourgish: Naturpark Uewersauer, French: Parc Naturel de la Haute-Sûre, German: Naturpark Obersauer) is a national park in the Éislek region of north-western Luxembourg.

== Environment ==
The heart of the park is the Upper Sûre Lake, the largest area of water in Luxembourg. It is primarily an area of conservation and a specially protected area for wild birds. The park has been designated an Important Bird Area (IBA) by BirdLife International because it supports significant populations of hazel grouse, black storks, ospreys, European honey-buzzards and middle spotted woodpeckers.

== Objectives ==
The objectives of the park are threefold:

- To protect the natural environment and ecosystem. The main principle underlying ecosystem protection in the park is that the environment is an integral network in which each element interacts and affects the functioning of the while. This means preserving the indigenous flora and fauna as well as protecting the purity of air, water, and soil quality.
- To develop economic activity, mostly forestry and low-density tourism as a means of creating employment and a high quality life. As a result, the transportation infrastructure throughout the park is excellent. To achieve this, the park provides a host of leisure activities, from nature walks to tours of cultural monuments, to water sports on the Upper Sûre Lake. More than 500 kilometres (310 mi) of well maintained footpaths make this a popular spot for day trippers and a wide range of accommodation for the vacationer. A fair and festival is held in the park annually on the first weekend in July.
- To preserve the architectural heritage of the area, which ranges from large numbers of chapels and disused mills to former slate quarries and castle ruins.
