= Bonnal, Doubs =

Bonnal
- Commune
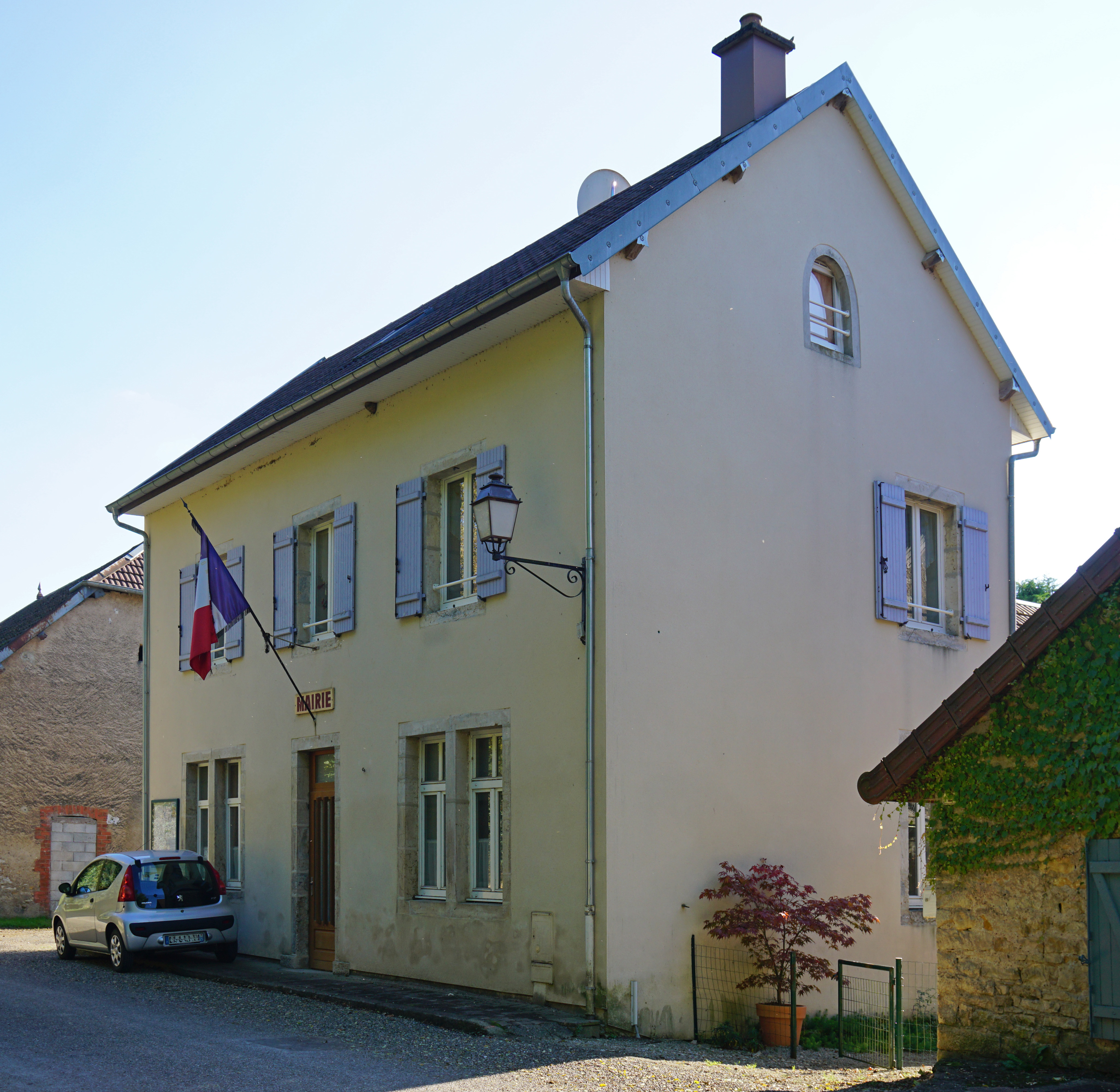
- The town hall in Bonnal
- Location of Bonnal
- Location within France Location within Bourgogne-Franche-Comté
- Coordinates: 47°30′27″N 6°21′23″E
- Country: France
- Region: Bourgogne-Franche-Comté
- Department: Doubs
- Arrondissement: Besançon
- Canton: Baume-les-Dames
- Intercommunality: Pays de Villersexel

Government
  - Mayor (2020–2026): Ghislaine Vuillier
- Area^{1}: 1.8 km^{2} (0.69 sq mi)
- Highest elevation: 292 m (958 ft)
- Lowest elevation: 251 m (823 ft)
- Population (2023): 20
  - Density: 11/km^{2} (29/sq mi)
- Time zone: UTC+01:00 (CET)
  - Summer (DST): UTC+02:00 (CEST)
- INSEE/Postal code: 25072 /25680
- ^{1} French Land Register data, which excludes lakes, ponds, glaciers > 1 km^{2} (0.386 sq mi or 247 acres) and river estuaries.

Bonnal (French pronunciation: [bɔnal]) is a commune in the Doubs department in the Bourgogne-Franche-Comté region in eastern France.

== Population ==
Historical population
Year	Pop.	±% p.a.
1968	27	—
1975	20	−4.20%
1982	25	+3.24%
1990	25	+0.00%
1999	24	−0.45%
2007	25	+0.51%
2012	23	−1.65%
2017	29	+4.75%
2023	20	−6.00%
Source: INSEE

== See also ==
- Lac de Bonnal
- Communes of the Doubs department
