= Harlange =

Coordinates: 49°56′N 5°47′E

Harlange Harel
- Former commune of Luxembourg
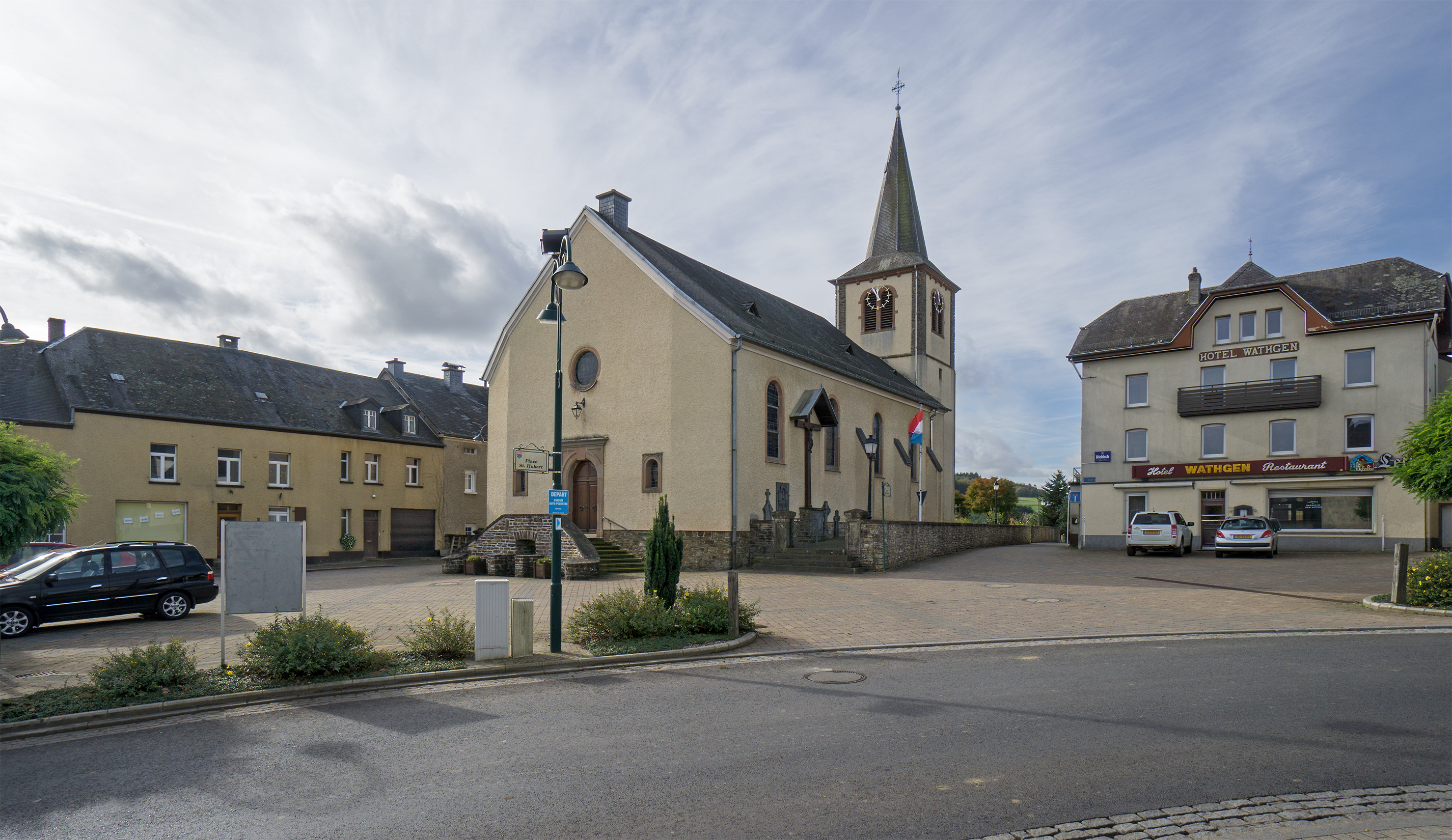
- Interactive map of Harlange
- Country: Luxembourg
- Canton: Wiltz
- Commune: Lac de la Haute-Sûre
- Created: Original commune
- Abolished: 1 January 1979
- Currently: Part of Lac de la Haute-Sûre

Harlange (French pronunciation: [aʁlɑ̃ʒ]; Luxembourgish: Harel; German: Harlingen) is a small town in the commune of Lac de la Haute-Sûre, in north-western Luxembourg. As of September 2026, the town has a population of 624.

Harlange was a commune in the canton of Wiltz until 1 January 1979, when it was merged with the commune of Mecher to form the new commune of Lac de la Haute-Sûre. The law creating Lac de la Haute-Sûre was passed on 23 December 1978.

== Former commune ==
The former commune consisted of the villages:

- Harlange
- Tarchamps
- Watrange
- Schumannseck (lieu-dit)
