= Nothum =

Village in Luxembourg

Coordinates: 49°56′N 5°53′E

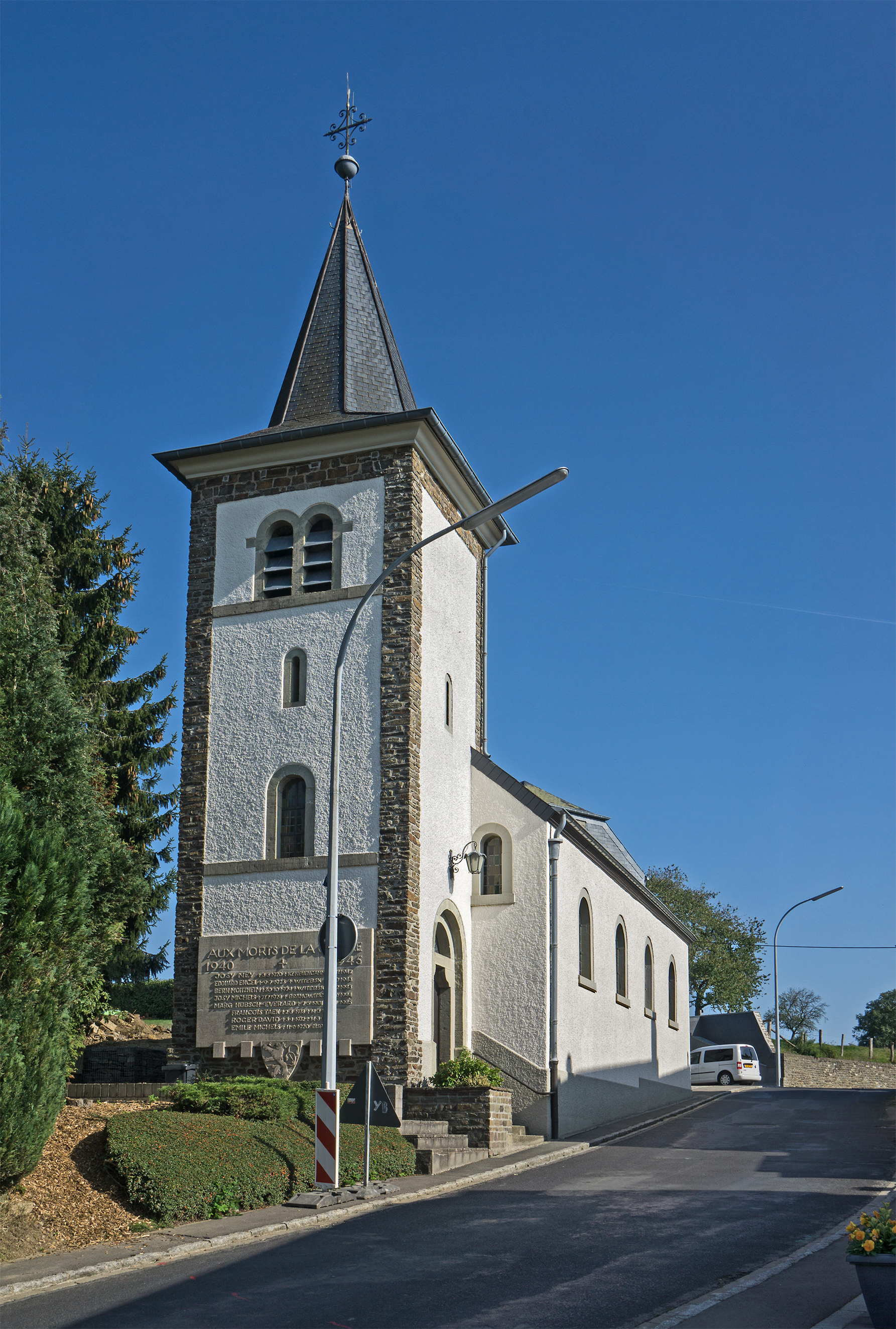
Church of Nothum

Nothum (Luxembourgish: Noutem) is a village in the commune of Lac de la Haute-Sûre, in north-western Luxembourg . As of September 2026, the village had a population of 409.
