= Kaundorf =

Coordinates: 49°55′N 5°54′E

Kaundorf (German pronunciation: [ˈkaʊndɔʁf]; Luxembourgish: Kauneref) is a village in the commune of Lac de la Haute-Sûre, in north-western Luxembourg. As of September 2026, the village has a population of 402 and is known for its WWII era underground bunkers, built to hide refugees.

== See also ==
- List of villages in Luxembourg
