= Ringel =

Surname

Ringel is a surname. Notable people with the surname include:

- Erwin Ringel (1921–1994), Austrian psychiatrist and neurologist who dedicated his life to suicide prevention
- Faye Ringel, former American professor of humanities at the United States Coast Guard Academy and an author
- Gerhard Ringel (1919–2008), German mathematician
- Jean-Désiré Ringel d'Illzach (1849–1916), French sculptor and engraver
- Julius Ringel (1889–1967), Austrian-born German General of Mountain Troops (General der Gebirgstruppen)
- Meredith Ringel Morris, an American computer scientist

== See also ==
- Ringel–Hall algebra, generalization of the Hall algebra, studied by Claus Michael Ringel (1990)

Media related to Ringel (surname) at Wikimedia Commons
