= Bonnal, Luxembourg =

Coordinates: 49°54′N 5°53′E

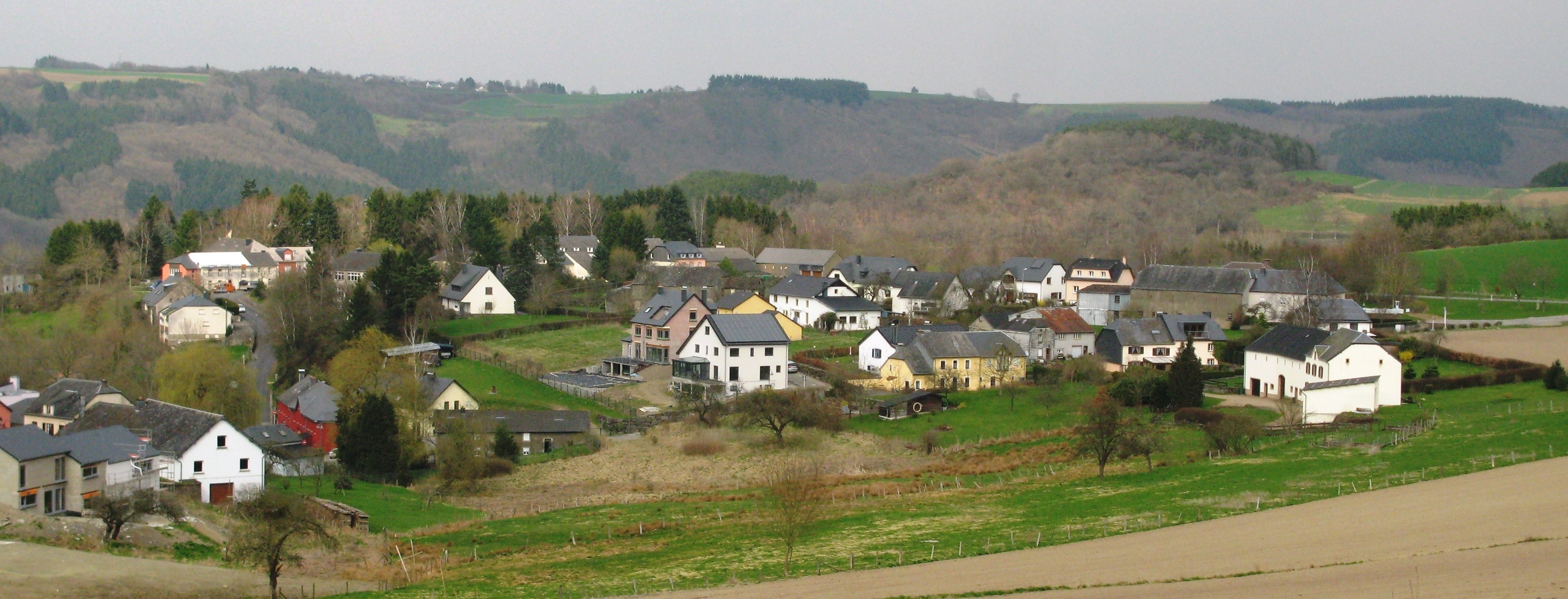
View of Bonnal

Bonnal (Luxembourgish: Bommel) is a village in the commune of Esch-sur-Sûre, in north-western Luxembourg, on the south shore of the Upper Sûre Lake. As of September 2026, the village had a population of 87. It was the administrative centre of the commune of Neunhausen until it merged into Esch-sur-Sûre in 2011.
