= Merscheid =

Coordinates: 49.872°N 5.969°E

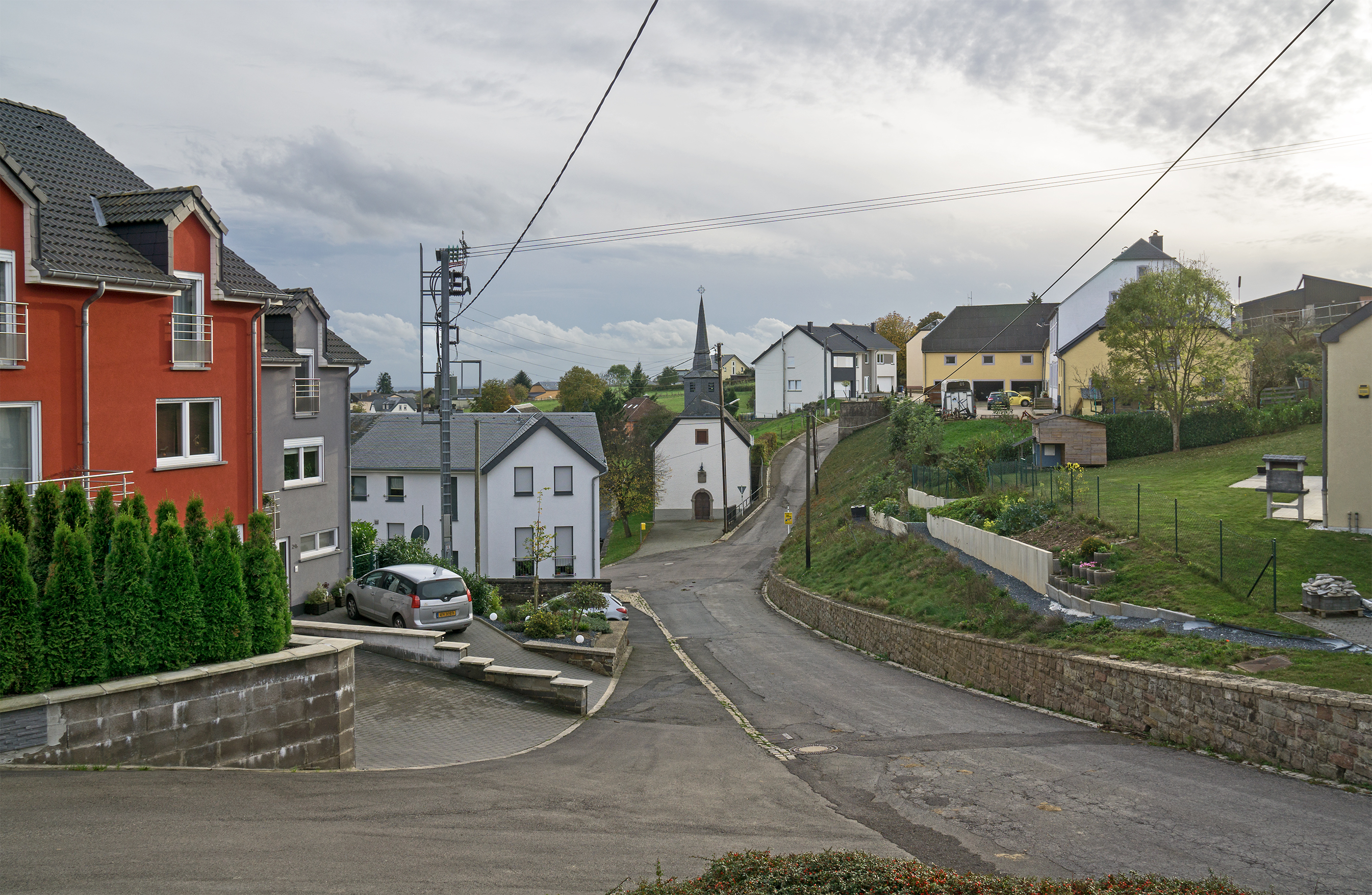
Road in Merscheid and view on the chapel

Merscheid (Luxembourgish: Mëtscheed) is a village in the commune of Esch-sur-Sûre, in north-western Luxembourg. As of September 2026, the village has a population of 320, and it is known for its picturesque countryside and natural beauty. The village is surrounded by rolling hills, forests, and meadows, making it a popular destination for hiking, biking, and other outdoor activities.
