= Lac de Bonnal =

Lake in Bourgogne-Franche-Comté, France

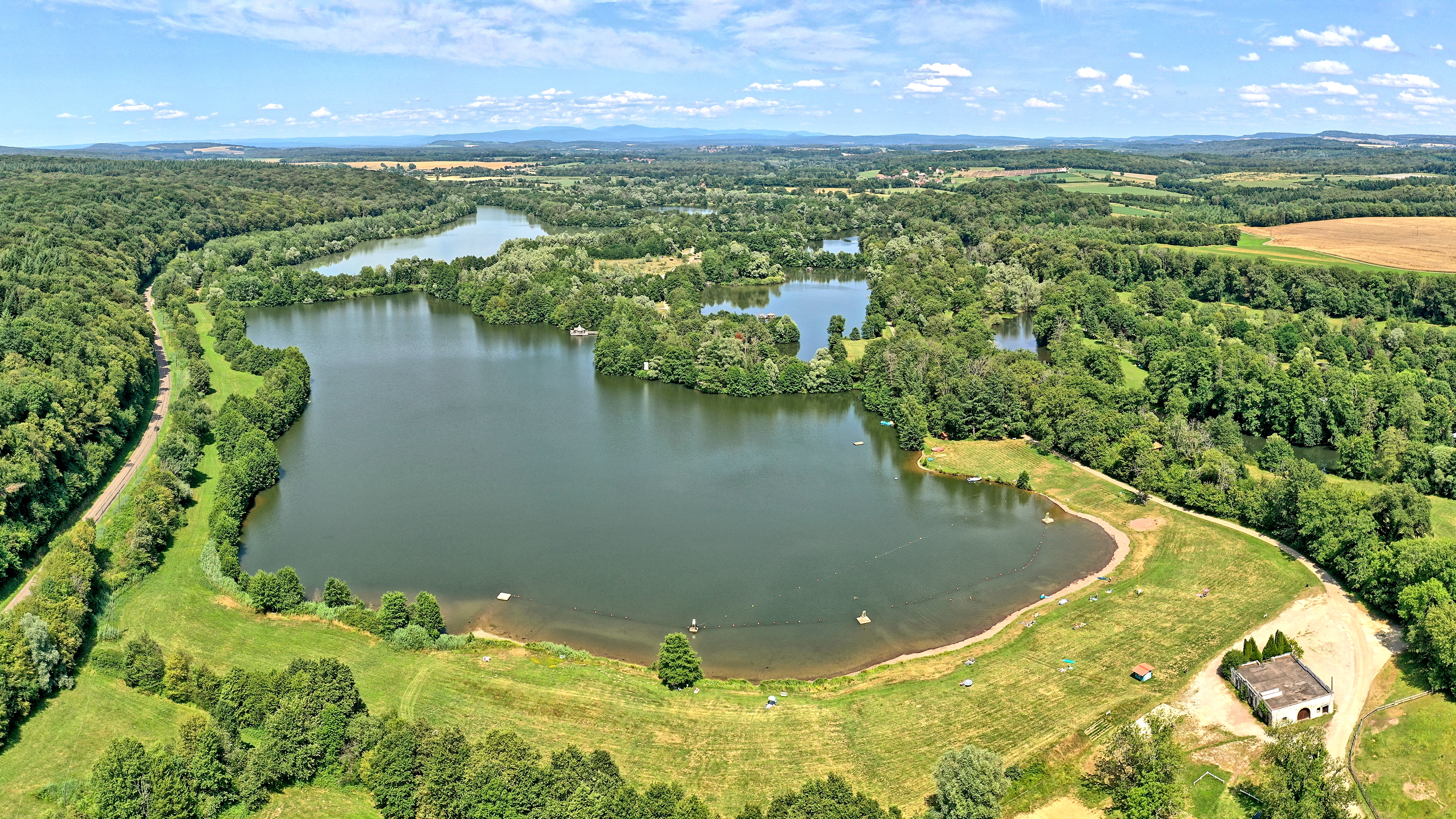
- Ansicht des Sees

- Location within France
- Location: Haute-Saône, Doubs
- Coordinates: 47°31′N 6°22′E
- Type: natural
- Primary inflows: Ognon
- Basin countries: France
- Surface elevation: 254 m (833 ft)

Lac de Bonnal is a lake between Haute-Saône and Doubs, France.
