= Tarchamps =

Town in north-western Luxembourg

Coordinates: 49°57′N 5°48′E

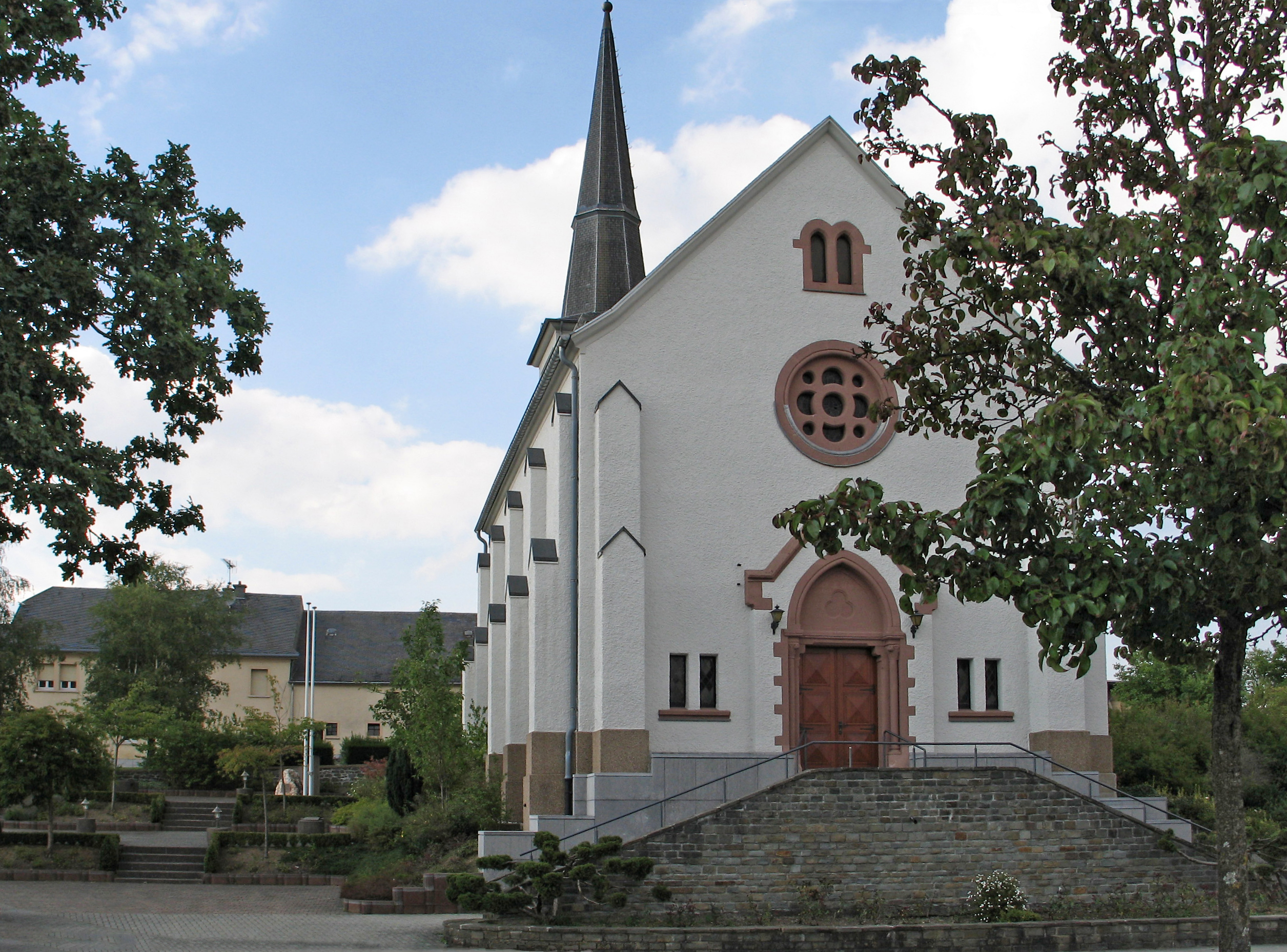
Iischpelt near the church

Tarchamps (French pronunciation: [taʁʃɑ̃]; Luxembourgish: Iischpelt; German: Ischpelt) is a small town in the commune of Lac de la Haute-Sûre, in north-western Luxembourg. As of September 2026, the town has a population of 420.
