= Esch-sur-Sûre =

Esch-sur-Sûre Esch-Sauer
- Commune
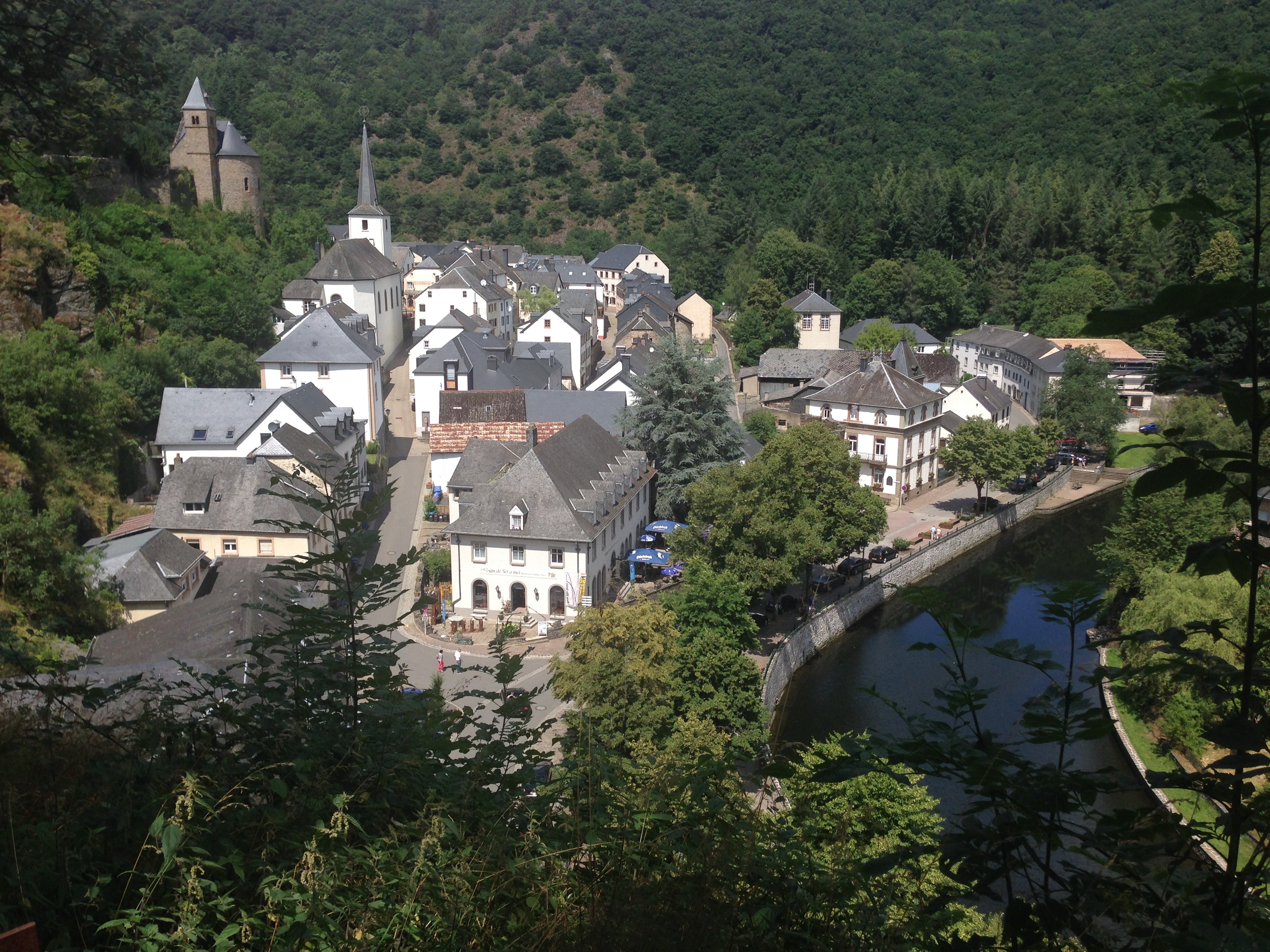
- Esch-sur-Sûre

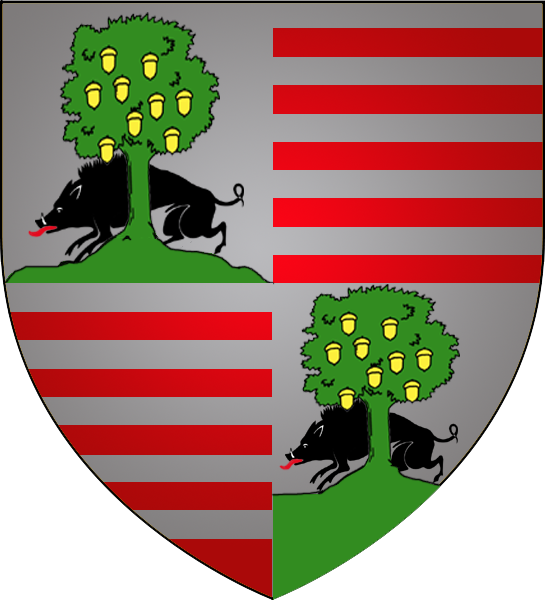
- Coat of arms

- Map of Luxembourg with Esch-sur-Sûre highlighted in orange, and the canton in dark red
- Coordinates: 49.911°N 5.93467°E
- Country: Luxembourg
- Canton: Wiltz

Government
  - Mayor: Mireille Welter

Area
  - Total: 51.26 km^{2} (19.79 sq mi)
  - Rank: 8th of 100
- Highest elevation: 529 m (1,736 ft)
  - Rank: 10th of 100
- Lowest elevation: 238 m (781 ft)
  - Rank: 46th of 100

Population (2025)
  - Total: 3,279
  - Rank: 53rd of 100
  - Density: 63.97/km^{2} (165.7/sq mi)
  - Rank: 87th of 100
- Time zone: UTC+1 (CET)
  - Summer (DST): UTC+2 (CEST)
- LAU 2: LU0000802
- Website: esch-sur-sure.lu

Esch-sur-Sûre (French pronunciation: [ɛʃ syʁ syʁ], lit. 'Esch on Sûre'; Luxembourgish: Esch-Sauer, pronounced [ˌæʃˈzɑʊ̯ɐ]; German: Esch-Sauer, pronounced [ˌɛʃˈzaʊɐ]) is a commune and small town in north-western Luxembourg, situated in the canton of Wiltz. At one point it was the second smallest commune by area in Luxembourg (after Remich), until Neunhausen and Heiderscheid were merged into it in 2011.

As of September 2026, the town of Esch-sur-Sûre, which lies in the north of the commune, has a population of 415.

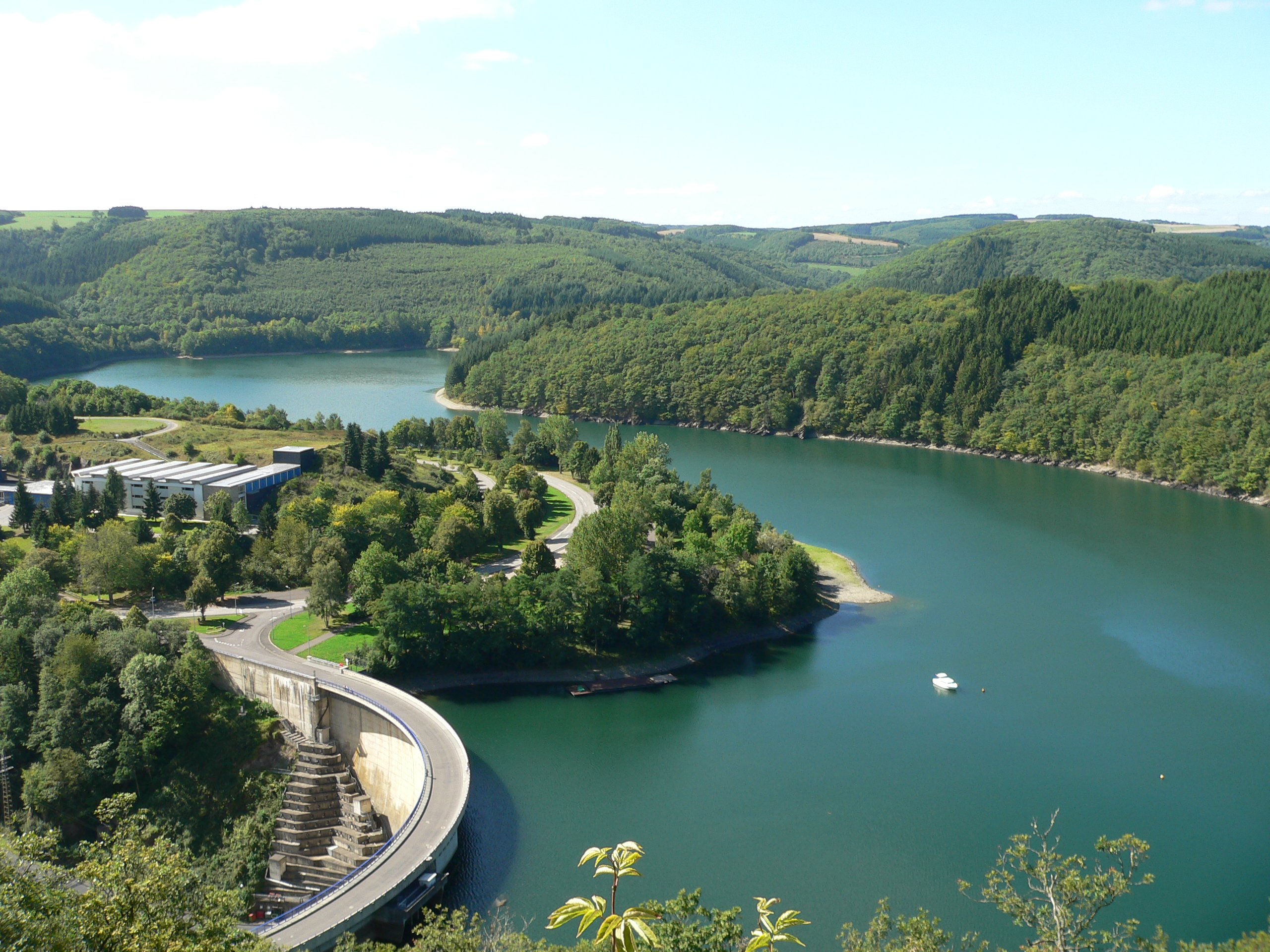
Esch-sur-Sûre dam and reservoir

Esch-sur-Sûre is situated by the river Sauer, just east and downstream of the artificial Upper Sauer Lake. The town's prominent 10th Century castle, and the main part of the town below, sit on a spur of a land within a sharp meander of the river.

The suffix to its name distinguishes Esch-sur-Sûre from the city of Esch-sur-Alzette, which is often known just as Esch.

Immediately above the town, the river has been dammed to form a hydroelectric reservoir extending some 6 miles (10 km) up the valley. The Upper Sauer dam was built in the 1960s to meet the country's drinking water needs.

== Populated places ==
The commune consists of the following villages:

Esch-sur-Sûre Section:

- Esch-sur-Sûre

Heiderscheid Section:

- Dirbach
- Eschdorf
- Heiderscheid
- Fond de Heiderscheid
- Merscheid
- Ringel
- Tadler
- Hierheck (lieu-dit)

Neunhausen Section:

- Bonnal
- Insenborn
- Lultzhausen
- Neunhausen
- Bourgfried (lieu-dit)

== Population ==
Historical population

Year	Pop.	±%
1821	2,345	—
1851	3,265	+39.2%
1900	2,529	−22.5%
1910	2,432	−3.8%
1922	2,176	−10.5%
1935	1,950	−10.4%

Year	Pop.	±%
1947	1,770	−9.2%
1960	1,591	−10.1%
1970	1,439	−9.6%
1981	1,392	−3.3%
1990	1,476	+6.0%
2000	1,572	+6.5%

Year	Pop.	±%
2005	1,767	+12.4%
2010	2,096	+18.6%
2015	2,477	+18.2%
2020	2,855	+15.3%
2021	2,982	+4.4%

Source data
