= Bavigne =

Coordinates: 49°55′N 5°51′E

Bavigne (French pronunciation: [baviɲ]; Luxembourgish: Béiwen; German: Böwen [ˈbøːvn̩]) is a village in the commune of Lac de la Haute-Sûre, of which it is the administrative centre, in north-western Luxembourg. As of September 2026, the village had a population of 192.
