= Canton of Wiltz =

Canton of Wiltz Kanton Wolz (Luxembourgish) Canton de Wiltz (French) Kanton Wiltz (German)
- Canton
- Flag Coat of arms

- Coordinates: 49°57′N 5°56′E
- Country: Luxembourg
- Legislative constituency: Nord
- LAU 1: LU00008
- Communes (cities in bold): Boulaide; Esch-sur-Sûre; Goesdorf; Kiischpelt; Lac de la Haute-Sûre; Wiltz; Winseler

Area
  - Total: 264.6 km^{2} (102.2 sq mi)
  - Rank: 3rd of 12
- Highest elevation (4th of 12): 537 m (1,762 ft)
- Lowest elevation (11th of 12): 233 m (764 ft)

Population (2026)
  - Total: 20,391
  - Rank: 11th of 12
  - Density: 77.06/km^{2} (199.6/sq mi)
  - Rank: 11th of 12

Wiltz (Luxembourgish: Wolz) is a canton in northwestern Luxembourg. It covers an area of 264.55 km^{2}, and as of 2023 it has a population of 19,209. It borders Belgium.

== Administrative divisions ==
Wiltz Canton consists of the following seven communes:

- Boulaide
- Esch-sur-Sûre
- Goesdorf
- Kiischpelt
- Lac de la Haute-Sûre
- Wiltz
- Winseler

== Mergers ==
- On 1 January 1979 the former communes of Harlange and Mecher (both from Wiltz Canton) were merged to create the commune of Lac de la Haute-Sûre. The law creating Lac de la Haute-Sûre was passed on 23 December 1978.
- On 1 January 2006 the former communes of Kautenbach and Wilwerwiltz (both from Wiltz Canton) were merged to create the commune of Kiischpelt. The law creating Kiischpelt was passed on 14 July 2005.
- On 1 January 2012 the former communes of Heiderscheid and Neunhausen (both from Wiltz Canton) were absorbed into the commune of Esch-sur-Sûre. The law expanding Esch-sur-Sûre was passed on 31 May 2011.
- On 1 January 2015 the former commune of Eschweiler (from Wiltz Canton) was absorbed into the commune of Wiltz. The law expanding Wiltz was passed on 19 December 2014.

== Population ==
Historical population

Year	Pop.	±%
1821	9,780	—
1851	15,023	+53.6%
1871	15,768	+5.0%
1880	15,404	−2.3%
1890	13,554	−12.0%
1900	12,821	−5.4%
1910	12,827	+0.0%
1922	12,288	−4.2%
1930	12,625	+2.7%

Year	Pop.	±%
1947	11,545	−8.6%
1960	10,158	−12.0%
1970	9,481	−6.7%
1981	8,997	−5.1%
1991	9,597	+6.7%
2001	11,704	+22.0%
2011	13,832	+18.2%
2021	18,562	+34.2%

Source: Le Portail des Statistiques du Luxembourg
