= Upper Sûre Lake =

- Luxembourgish: Stauséi Uewersauer; French: Lac de la Haute-Sûre; German: Obersauer-Stausee
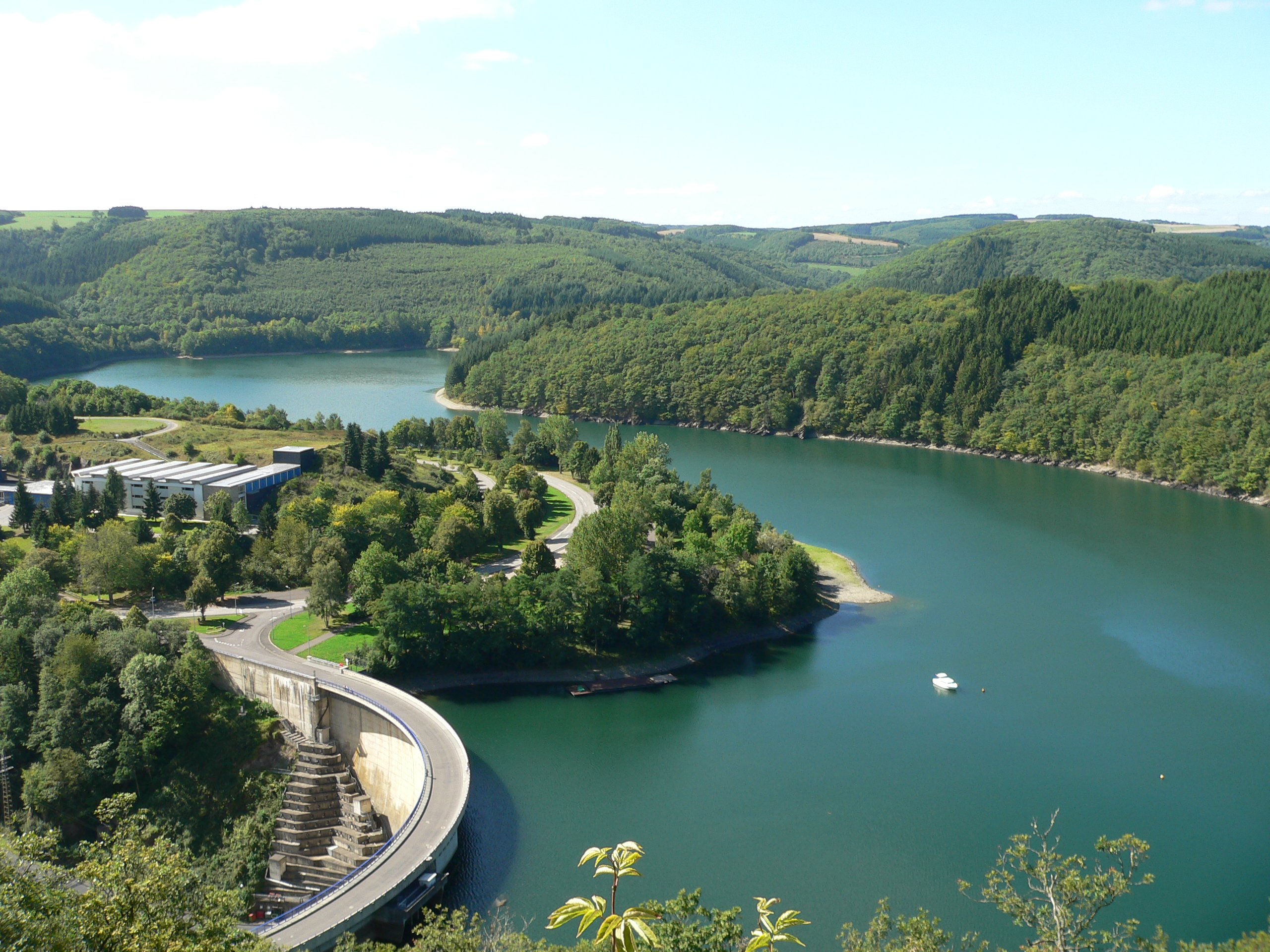

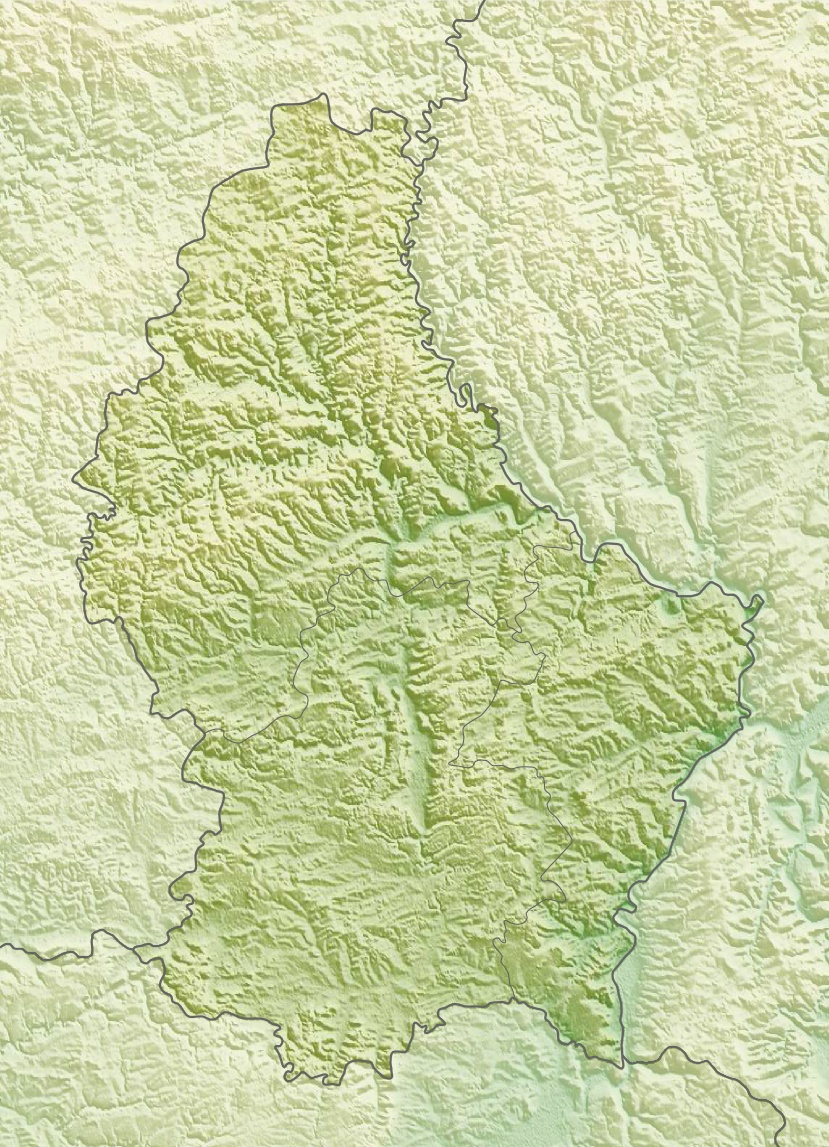
- Location within Luxembourg
- Coordinates: 49°54′N 5°52′E
- Type: Reservoir
- Designation: Nature reserve
- Construction engineer: André Coyne
- First flooded: 1959
- Surface area: 3.8 km^{2} (1.5 sq mi)
- Max. depth: 43 m (141 ft)
- Shore length^{1}: 48 km (30 mi)
- Surface elevation: 322 m (1,056 ft)
- Website: Upper Sûre Lake

Ramsar Wetland
- Official name: Vallée de la Haute-Sûre
- Designated: 8 March 2004
- Reference no.: 1407

Ramsar Wetland
- Official name: Vallée de la Haute-Sûre
- Designated: 8 March 2004
- Reference no.: 1408
- ^{1} Shore length is not a well-defined measure.

The Upper Sûre Lake (Luxembourgish: Stauséi Uewersauer; French: Lac de la Haute-Sûre [lak də la ot syʁ]; German: Obersauer-Stausee [ˈoːbɐˌzaʊɐ ˈʃtaʊˌzeː]) is a large reservoir in north-western Luxembourg. It is the largest body of water in the country. It gives its name to the commune of Lac de la Haute-Sûre, which was formed in 1979.

== History ==
It was created by the Esch-sur-Sûre Dam which was built in the 1950s to meet Luxembourg's drinking water and electricity needs. The town of Esch-sur-Sûre/Esch-Sauer nestles at one end of the lake. Immediately above it, the river has been dammed to form a hydroelectric reservoir extending some 10 kilometres (6.2 mi) up the valley. Its average surface area is 3.8 km^{2} (1.5 sq mi), or about 0.15% of Luxembourg's total area.

== Protected area ==
The region around the reservoir forms the Upper Sûre Natural Park, a Luxembourgish national park. The valley of the Upper Sûre surrounding the reservoir has been designated as a Ramsar site, in Luxembourg and in neighboring Belgium, since 2004.

== Recreation ==
Surrounded by luxuriant vegetation and peaceful creeks, the lake is a center for water sports, such as sailing, canoeing, and kayaking. Such outdoor activities, which make it an attractive spot for tourists, has led to the growth of a local crafts industry. The lake has a very high level of water quality.

== See also ==
- Upper Sûre Natural Park
