= Eschdorf =

Town in the commune of Esch-sur-Sûre in Luxembourg

Coordinates: 49°53′N 5°56′E

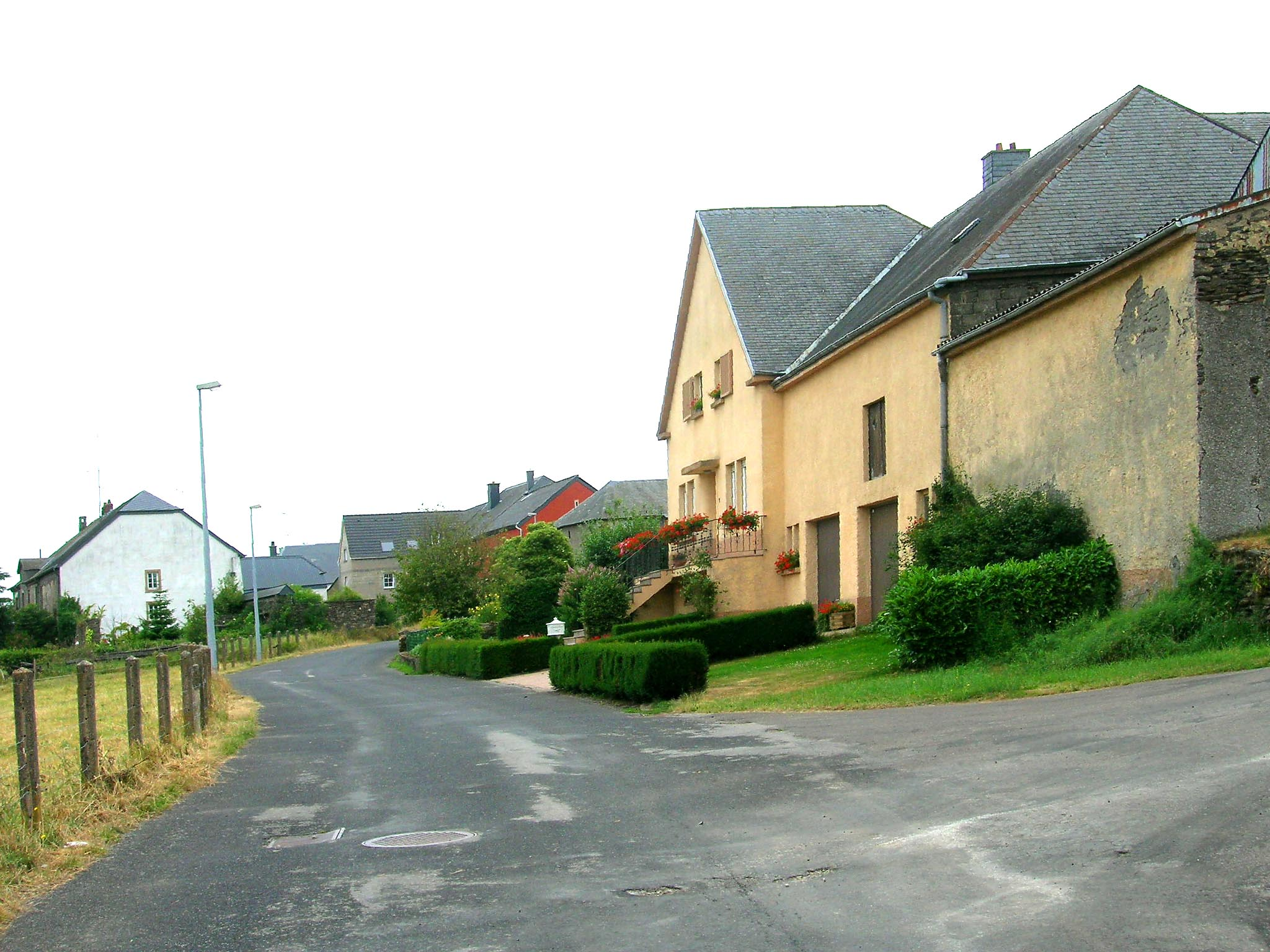

Eschdorf (German pronunciation: [ˈɛʃdɔʁf]; Luxembourgish: Eschduerf) is a small town in the commune of Esch-sur-Sûre, in north-western Luxembourg. As of September 2026, the town had a population of 1,017. It is the commune of Esch-sur-Sûre's administrative centre.
