= Pointe de Givet =

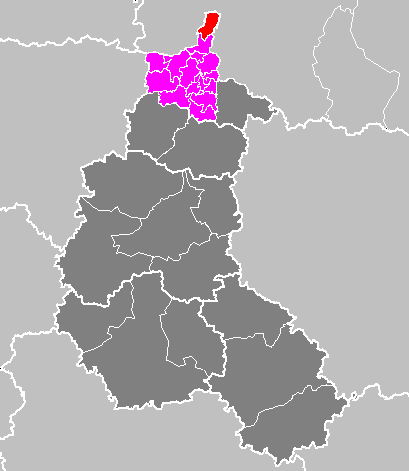
Canton of Givet (red) in the northern top of the arrondissement of Charleville-Mézières arrondissement

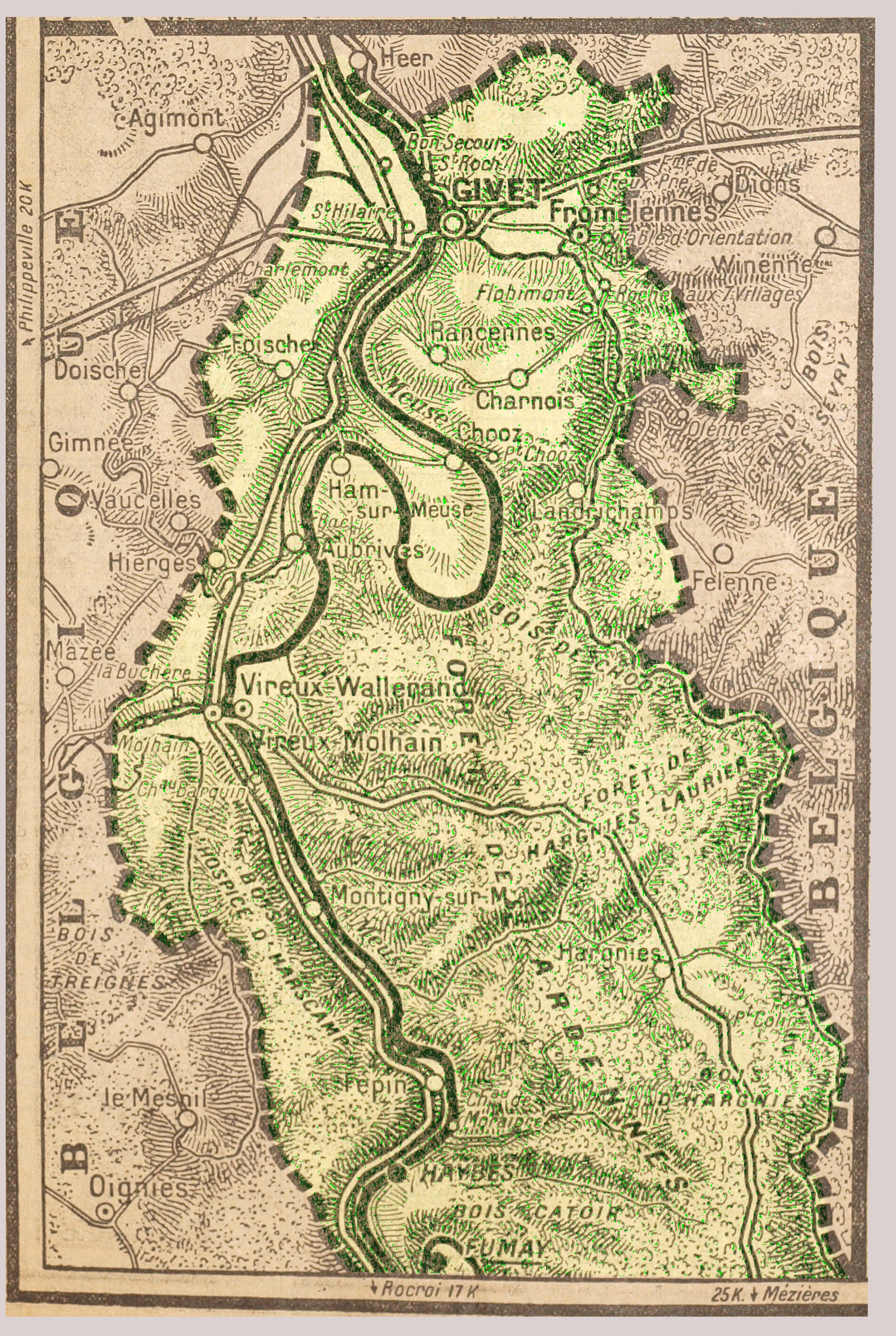
The pointe de Givet in a map dating from May, 1940

The pointe de Givet (Givet point, also known as doigt de Givet or Pointe des Ardennes, finger of Givet or Point of the Ardennes) is the extreme north of the department of Ardennes in the Grand Est region in northeastern France. This small territory is 25 km in length and 10 km wide and forms a small strip extending deep into Belgian Ardennes along the Meuse. Larger cities in the pointe de Givet include Revin, Fumay, and Givet.

== Identity ==
The pointe de Givet formed around geographic, linguistic, and historic particularities: the enclosed valley was long under the sovereignty from the Prince-Bishopric of Liège where dialects of Walloon were spoken.

== Geography ==
The pointe de Givet is located on the western border of the Ardennes mountain range in the natural region of Ardennes. It is around 250 km^{2} and in the form of a point extending into Belgium and constitutes the most northern part of the French department of Ardennes. It corresponds to a ridge in the Ardennes plateau carved into the Meuse valley. Bounded to the north by the Condroz region, the pointe de Givet sits between the Fagne region to the west, the Famenne region to the east, and crosses the Calestienne region. The richness of the flora and fauna classified the region as a special protection zone in the Natura 2000 network.

The choice to place the Chooz Nuclear Power Plant was motivated by the presence of the Meuse as a reservoir for cooling liquid. However, much of the territory surrounding the plant is not on French land. Cooperation agreements between the French and Belgian governments had to be made in the management of the power plant.

== Flora and fauna ==
The pointe de Givet is known for its diverse flora and fauna. Almost the entirety of the pointe is classified as a special protection zone by the Natura 2000 network.

Covered 80% by hilly forests and closed-off valleys (Meuse, Semois, Houille), the pointe de Givet hosts a diverse environment:

- Wetlands: rivers, ponds, swamps, bogs, and wet forests and prairies.
- A wide array of woods and forests: riparian, acidophile, boxwood, beech, oak
- Hedges, bushes, prairies, heaths
- Cliffs, caves, stony and rocky areas

It is also a migratory stop and breeding, nesting, and hibernation ground for several threatened and protected species of birds.

== Notable sights ==
- The Pointe de Givet Natural Reserve and its surroundings: dry grasses, heaths, boxwoods and rocky fields provide shelter for interesting species of reptiles, birds, bats, butterflies, and plants.
- In the bogs between Les Hautes-Rivières and Hargnies, Ardennes, several interesting species including the Eurasian beaver and Dactylorhiza sphagnicola.
- The forests of the Semoy valley including, acidophile forests, rocky forests, acidophile rock gardens, riparian forests, submerged vegetation of great botanical and ornithological interest.
- Rare forest groupings in the woody valley of the Houille.

== Culture ==
Part of French Wallonia, the pointe de Givet was, before 1914, one of the three "Walloon" territories (where Walloon was spoken) outside of Belgian Wallonia alongside Luxembourgish Wallonia (in Doncols and Sonlez, nearly extinct) and Prussian Wallonia.

Region of the Walloon language.

While the inhabitants of the pointe no longer speak Walloon, some traces remain: in the town of Dinant the phrase "Vive Djivet pol'peket" can still be heard and in Givet one says "Bramin d'pîres min pon d'kaûres" (many stones but little money), alluding to the rocks steep slopes where military garrisons were built and still remain.
