= Winseler =

Winseler Wanseler (Luxembourgish)
- Commune
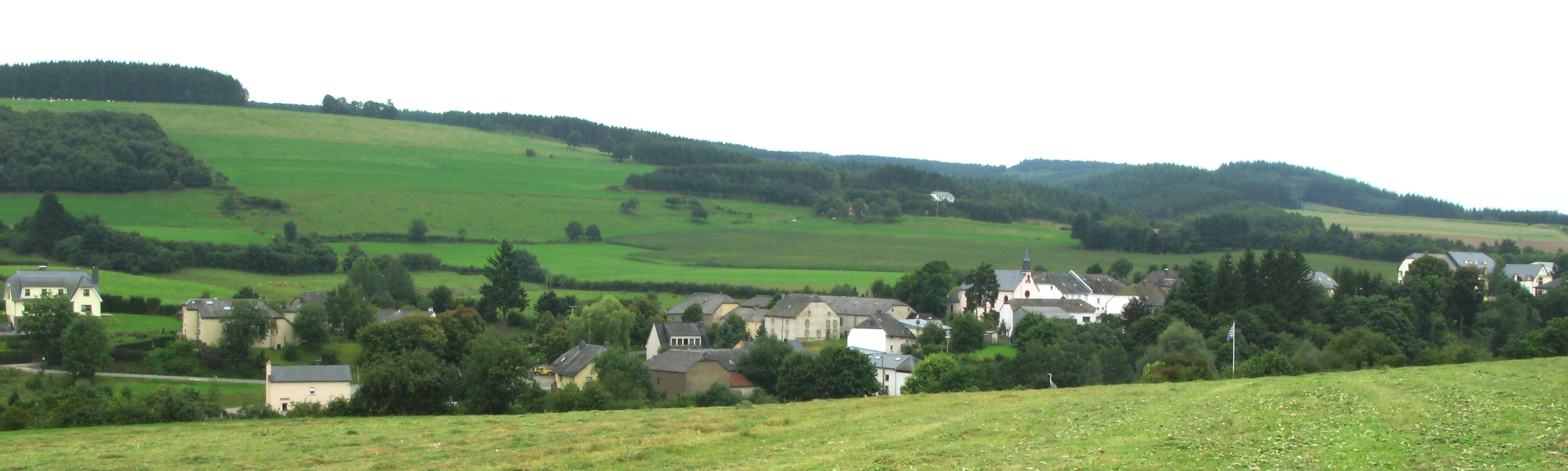
- Winseler seen from Schëllerfeld

- Coat of arms

- Map of Luxembourg with Winseler highlighted in orange, and the canton in dark red
- Coordinates: 49.9672°N 5.89°E
- Country: Luxembourg
- Canton: Wiltz

Government
  - Mayor: Romain Schroeder

Area
  - Total: 30.42 km^{2} (11.75 sq mi)
  - Rank: 25th of 100
- Highest elevation: 520 m (1,710 ft)
  - Rank: 13th of 100
- Lowest elevation: 320 m (1,050 ft)
  - Rank: 99th of 100

Population (2026)
  - Total: 1,619
  - Rank: 92nd of 100
  - Density: 53.22/km^{2} (137.8/sq mi)
  - Rank: 94th of 100
- Time zone: UTC+1 (CET)
  - Summer (DST): UTC+2 (CEST)
- LAU 2: LU0000808
- Website: winseler.lu

Winseler (German pronunciation: [ˈvɪnzəlɐ]; Luxembourgish: Wanseler) is a commune and village in north-western Luxembourg.

== Administrative organization and population ==
It is part of the canton of Wiltz.

As of September 2026, the village of Winseler, which lies in the east of the commune, has a population of 206. The (commune) of Winseler has a population of 1116.

Following the last Luxembourg communal elections in 2017, Romain Schroeder was returned as Mayor, and Charles Pauly as Alderman. Other members of the Council include, Roland Esch, Christophe Hansen, Paul Kayser, Fernand Majerus, Marc Schmitz, and Will Toex.

== Other towns within the commune ==
Other towns within the commune include Berlé, Doncols, Noertrange, Pommerloch, Grummelscheid, Schleif and Sonlez.

== Population ==
Historical population

Year	Pop.	±%
1821	745	—
1851	1,137	+52.6%
1900	990	−12.9%
1910	994	+0.4%
1922	911	−8.4%
1935	913	+0.2%

Year	Pop.	±%
1947	786	−13.9%
1960	643	−18.2%
1970	593	−7.8%
1981	601	+1.3%
1990	638	+6.2%
2000	744	+16.6%

Year	Pop.	±%
2005	1,016	+36.6%
2010	1,116	+9.8%
2015	1,140	+2.2%
2020	1,365	+19.7%
2021	1,403	+2.8%

Source data

=== Linguistic background ===
Like Lasauvage in the south of Luxembourg, Doncols and Sonlez, were formerly known as French-speaking (or, strictly, in their cases, Walloon-speaking) villages.

== See also ==
- Doncols#Historical and linguistic backgrounds
