= La Gleize =

La Gleize Li Gléjhe-dilé-Stoumont (Walloon)
- district
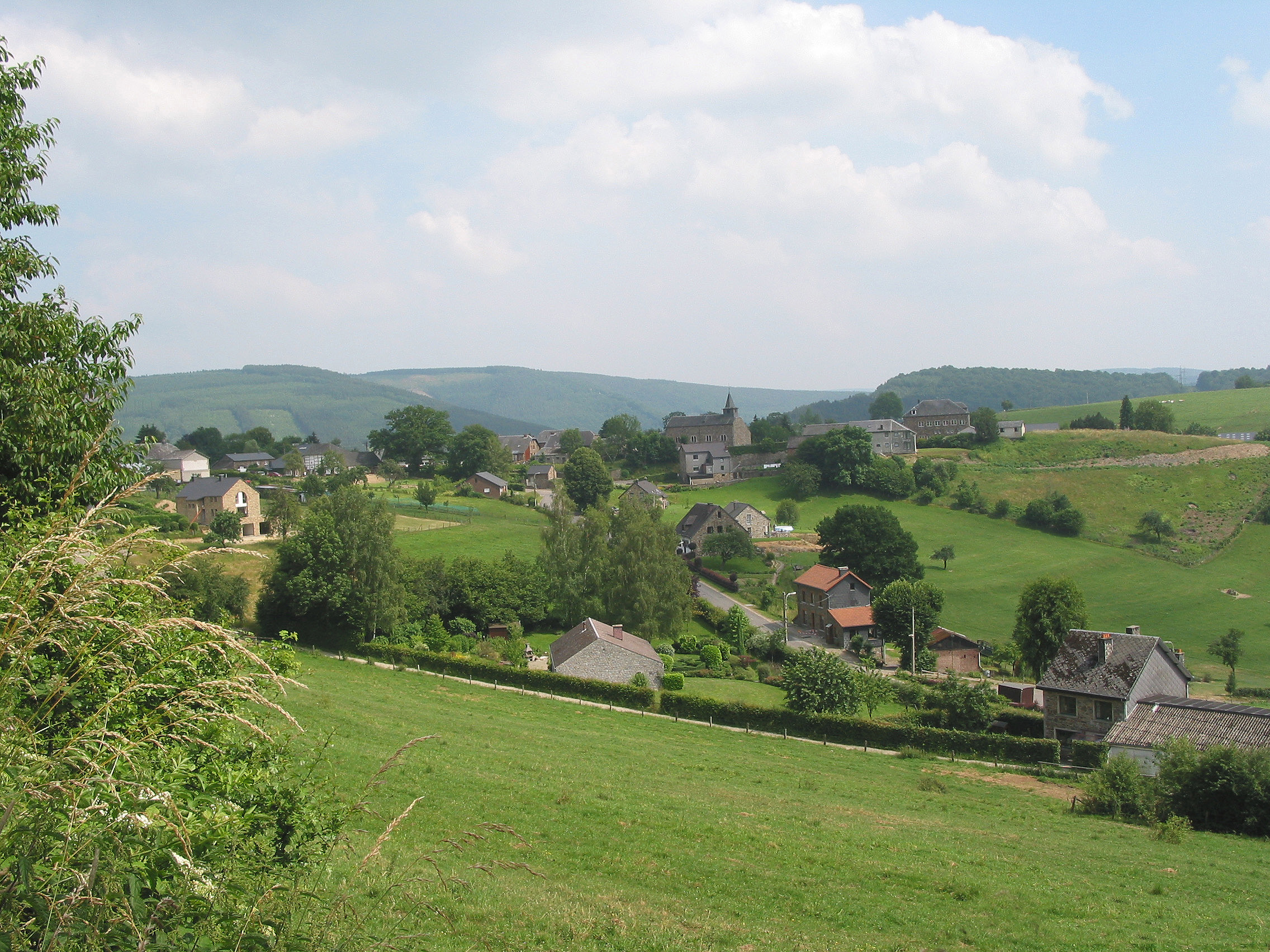
- The village and its Romanesque church

- La Gleize shown within Belgium
- Coordinates: 50°25′N 5°51′E
- Country: Belgium
- Region: Wallonia
- Province: Liège
- Municipality: Stoumont
- Postal code: 4987
- Area code: 080

La Gleize (French pronunciation: [la ɡlɛz]; Walloon: Li Gléjhe-dilé-Stoumont) is a village of Wallonia and a district of the municipality of Stoumont, located in the province of Liège, Belgium.

It was a municipality before the fusion of 1977. La Gleize is located on a rocky outcrop overlooking the valley of Amblève in the Ardennes region.

== Hamlets ==
Moulin du Ruy, Andrimont, Ruy, Exbomont, Heilrimont, Moustier, Neufmoulin, Roanne, Roanne-Coo, Borgoumont, Courtyard, Cheneux, La Venne, Monceau.

== Language ==
The Walloon dialect of La Gleize is one of the best researched in the area. This is due to the work of a native of the town, Louis Remacle, professor at the University of Liège and member of the Royal Academy of French Language and Literature of Belgium, who based part of his research there. His Syntaxe du parler wallon de La Gleize (3 vols.) was a model for Dialectology.

== Sights ==
The parish church

A Romanesque building of the 12th century, built in local stone, contains the red marble tomb of the Lords of Froidcourt. It was virtually rebuilt between 1945 and 1951: a photographic panel presents views from inside the church before the serious damage caused in 1944 by the Battle of the Bulge.

December 44 Museum - The Battle of the Bulge

Established in the village square opposite the church. A 1000 m2 museum is devoted entirely to the Battle of the Bulge of December 1944. La Gleize was where the advance of Kampfgruppe Peiper was halted. A German Tiger II tank is at the entrance of the building, inside is an abandoned reconnaissance armored Willys Jeep in perfect condition.

== Photos ==
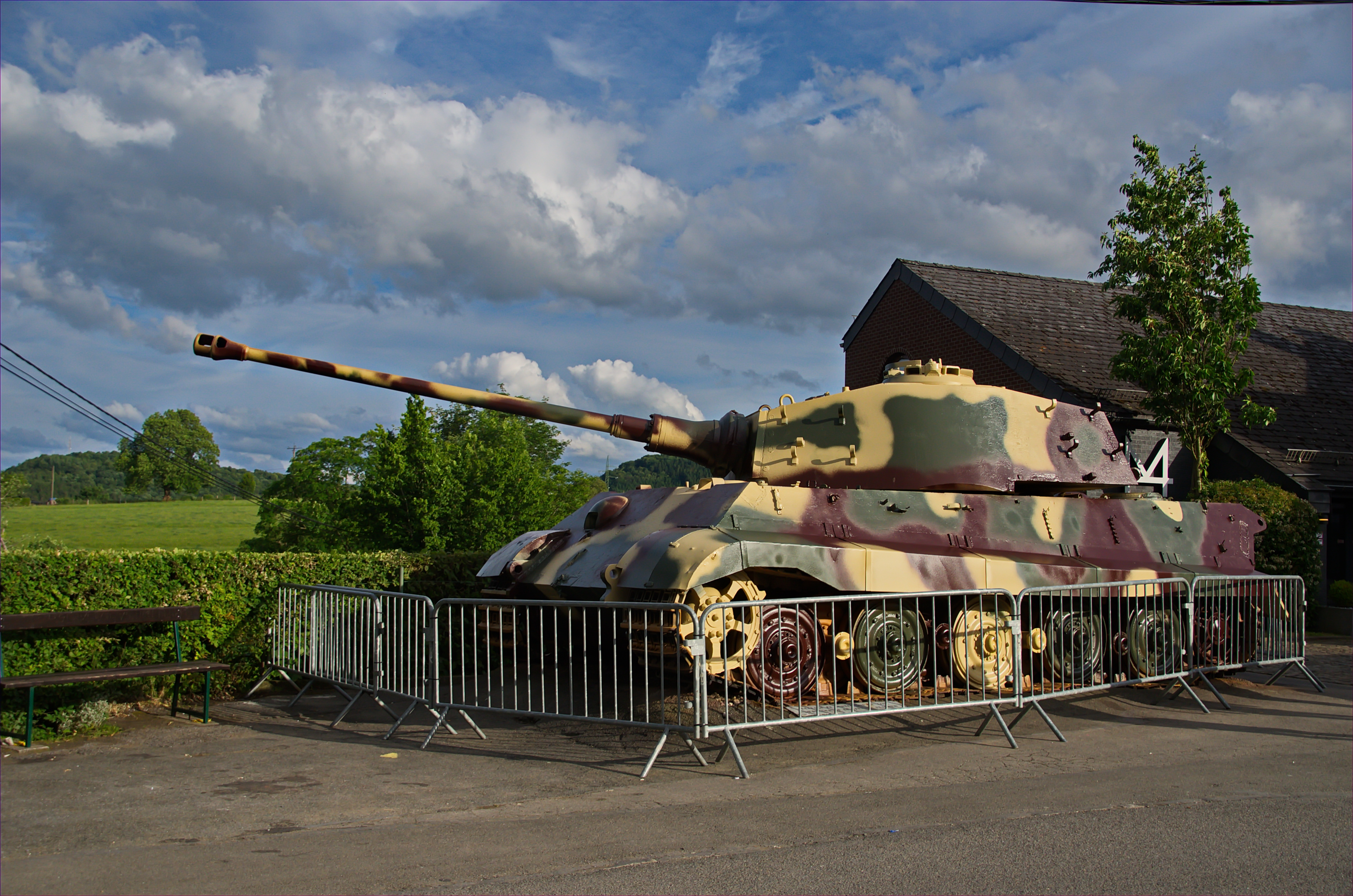
A preserved Tiger II tank left by the Kampfgruppe Peiper at La Gleize in December 1944

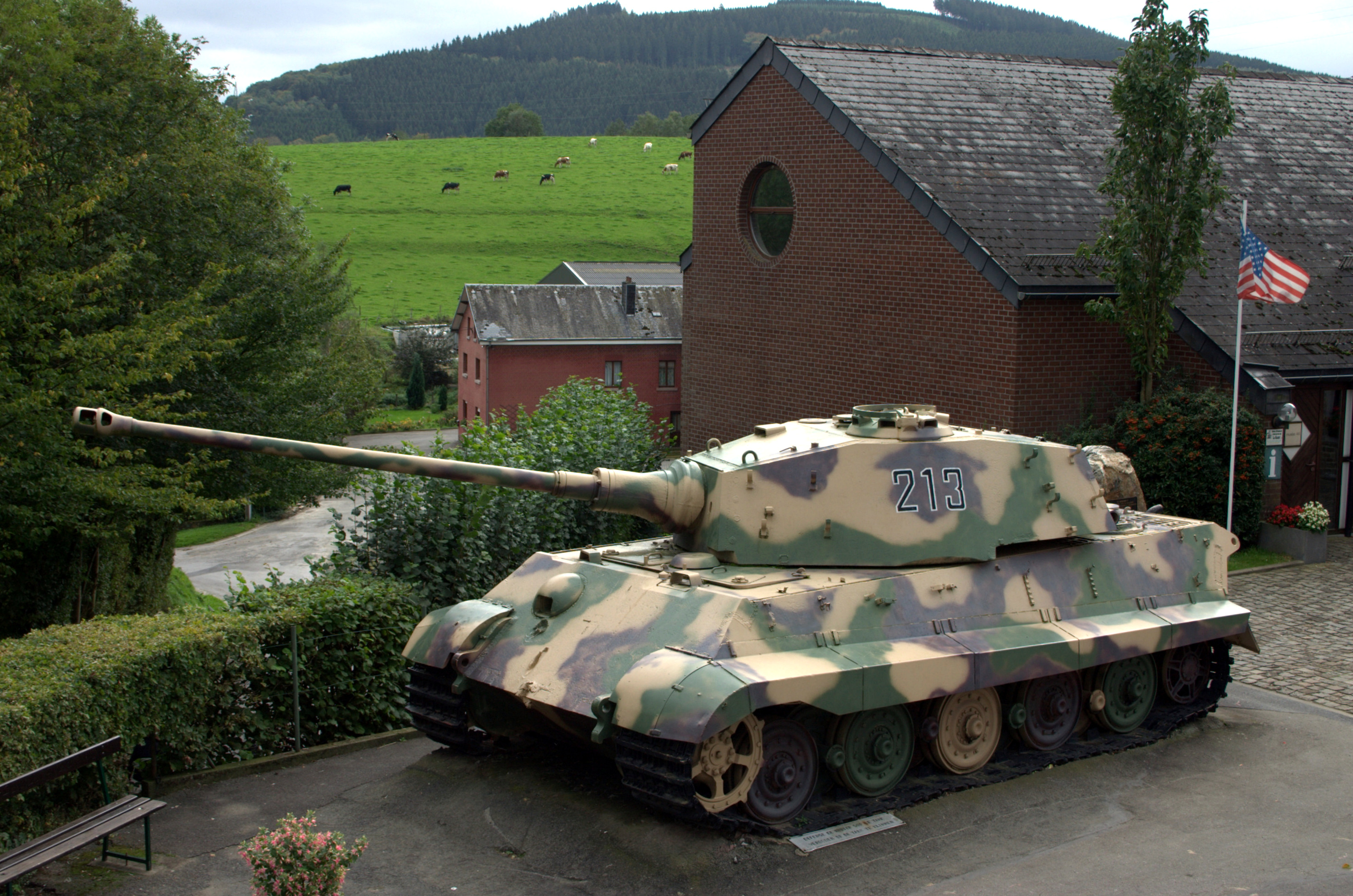
A German Tiger II tank in front of the December 44 Museum.
