= Walloon orthography =

Conventions for writing the Walloon language

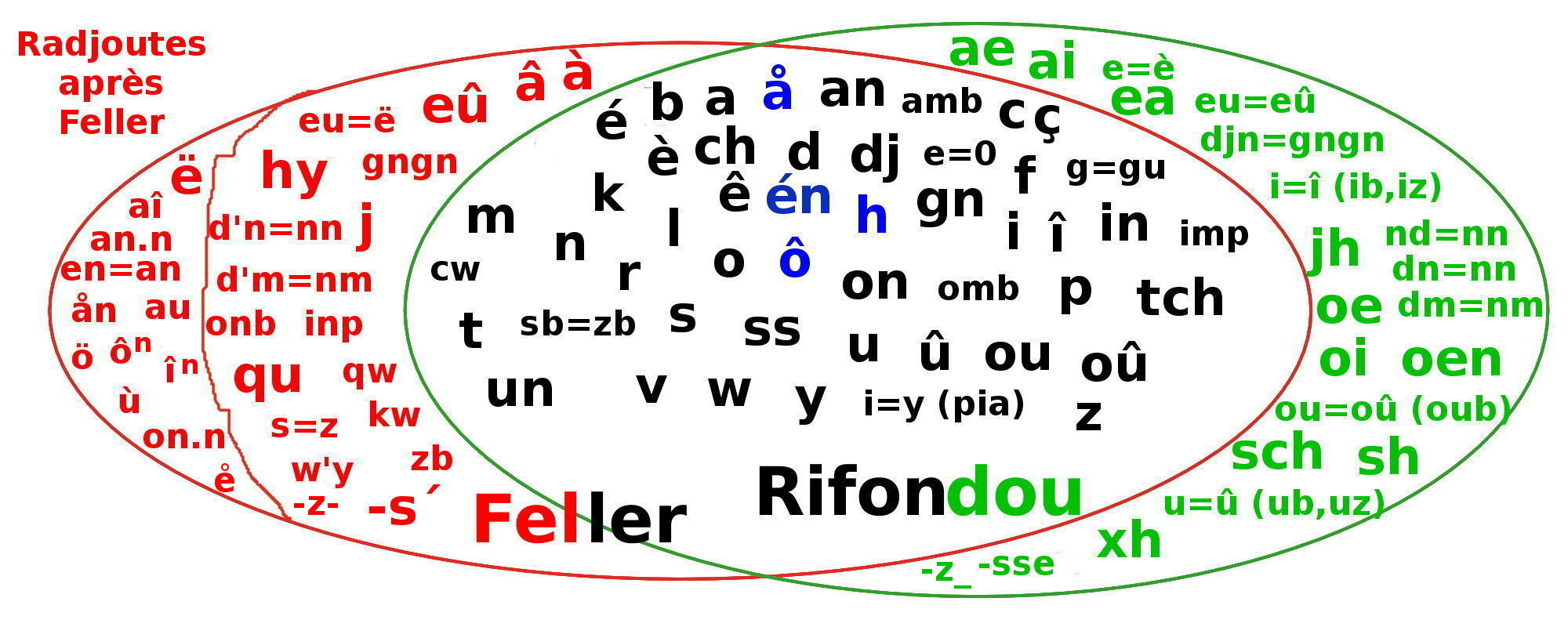
Letters used by the Feller System (on the left) and by Common Walloon (on the right)

The Walloon language has been written using various orthographies over its history, most notably the Feller system (sistinme Feller) and Common Walloon (rifondou walon or rfondou walon).

The Feller system was developed to transcribe Walloon dialects by Jules Feller and was first published in 1900. In the Feller system, the same word can be spelled differently depending on dialect: the word "fish" would be spelled pèchon by a speaker who pronounces the word as [pɛʃɔ̃] (with an 'sh' sound), but would be spelled pèhon by a speaker who pronounces the word as [pɛhɔ̃] (with an 'h' sound). In Common Walloon, however, the same word "fish" is always spelled pexhon, regardless of the speaker's pronunciation. The Common Walloon alphabet, developed through the 1990s, attempts to unify spellings across dialects, and revives some older graphemes (such as ⟨xh⟩) which were abandoned by Feller in favor of spellings which resembled standard French.

Walloon Alphabet
Letter	A	B	C	D	E	F	G	H	I	J	K	L	M	N	O	P	Q	R	S	T	U	V	W	X	Y	Z
Name	a	bé	cé	dé	e	effe	gé	ache	i	ji	ka	elle	emme	enne	o	pé	qu	erre	esse	té	u	vé	wé	icse	î gréc / yod	zéde

== History ==
=== Medieval Scripta ===
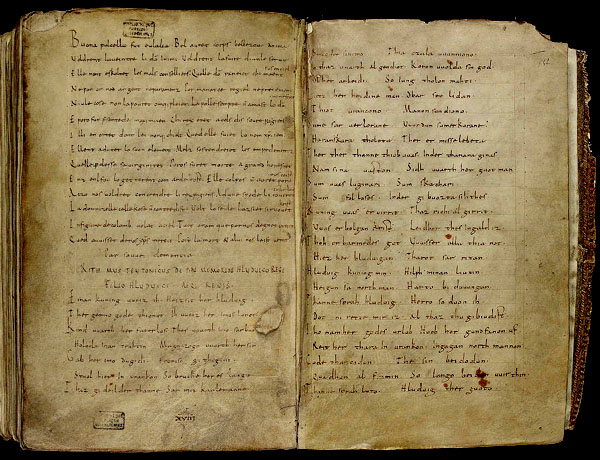
The Sequence of Saint Eulalia

Early texts written in the region of Wallonia were composed in Medieval Latin, such as the 7th century Vita Sanctae Geretrudis. In the 9th century, the first texts written in the vernacular langue d'oïl appear in northern Gaul. One of the earliest of these documents, the Sequence of Saint Eulalia from around 880, shows regional traits of Walloon, Champenois, and Picard. The medieval written language, often referred to as the scripta, used spellings that represented the spoken language only approximately, and was full of latinisms and archaic forms. The scripta was not specifically Walloon, but rather, according to linguist Maurice Delbouille, this common written language "in its role as an inter-regional idiom opposed on one hand the Latin of the clergy and on the other hand the everyday local dialect in the various regions." (Note: "...tous les textes romans ecrits alors dans le domaine d'oïl usaient d'une langue traditionnelle commune (maintenant appelée scripta par les philologues) qui, dans son rôle d'idiome interrégional s'opposait d'une part au latin des clercs et d'autre part, dans les diverses régions, au dialecte local de la vie de chaque jour.")

From the 13th century onward, the scripta used in Wallonia was increasingly influenced by the "central" dialect of Île-de-France. In an analysis of a document from 1236 Liège, the linguist Louis Remacle found that only about 15% of the vocabulary used was distinctively Walloon, with the rest either distinctly French or having a phonetic form common to all the langues d'oïl. From this time forward, writing in Wallonia underwent "cycles of purification", moving progressively closer and closer to the standard of the French language.

Even as the literature of Wallonia became almost entirely French through the 14th and 15th centuries, some Walloon words could still be found in local writing. A medical text from the early 15th century displays the situation by using the Walloon weris "healed" alongside the Middle French garira "will heal". Walloon toponyms and proper nouns, as well as some words for common objects could be found written in dialect, often spelled in distinctive ways, using graphemes like ⟨xh⟩ and ⟨ea⟩.

=== Early texts ===
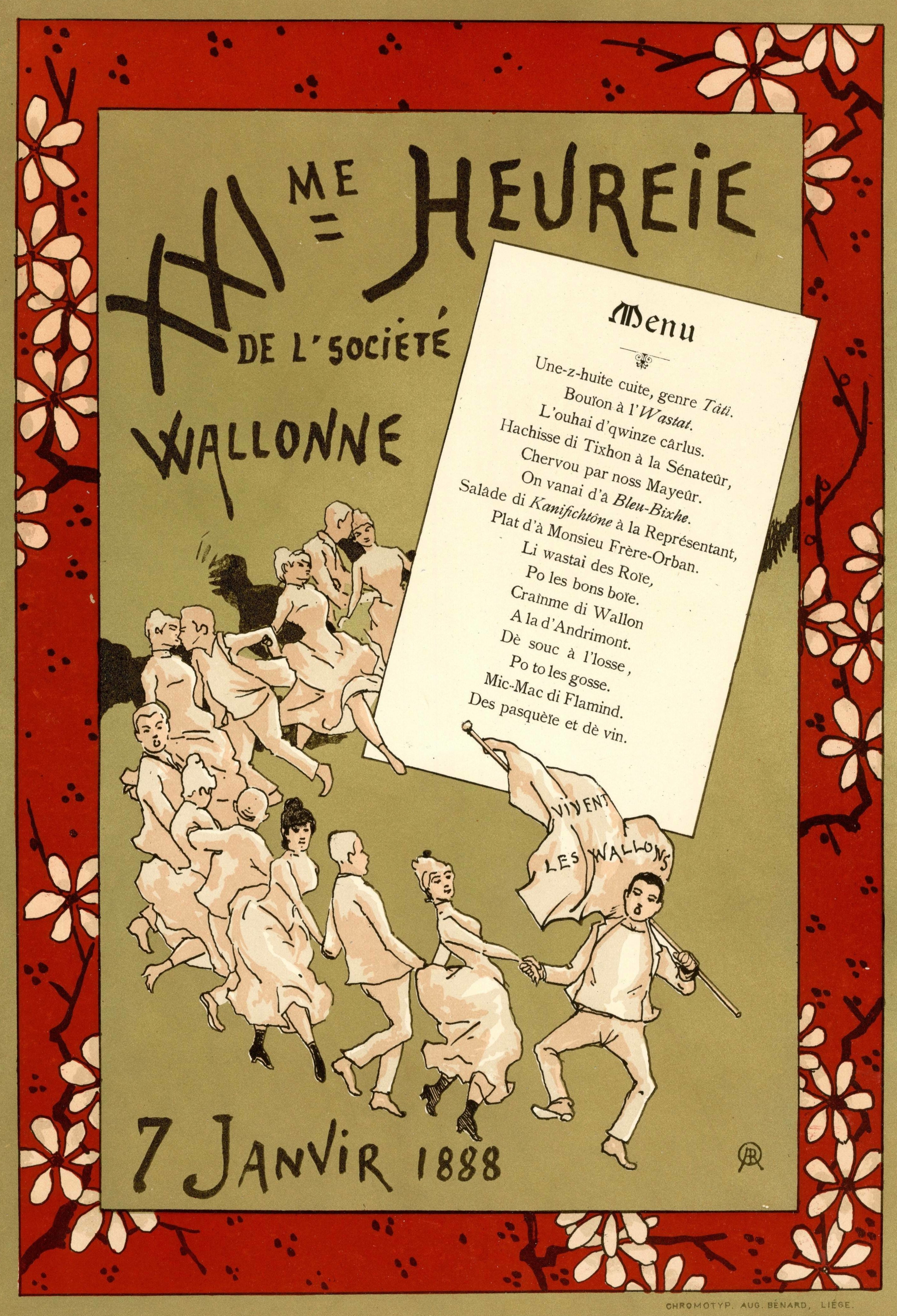
Illustration and menu for an event put on by the Society of Walloon Language and Literature, 1888

Beginning around 1600 some of the first "truly" Walloon documents appear, mostly in the Liège dialect. These include letters, poems, and works commenting on religious and political affairs. Spelling during this early period was inconsistent, as evidenced by different published names of the 1757 opéra comique Li Voyèdje di Tchaufontainne:

- Li Voëgge di Chôfontaine, ed. 1757
- Li Voège di Chofontaine, ed. 1784
- Li Voège di Chôfotaine, ed. 1830
- Voyège di Chaudfontaine, ed. 1858
- Li Voègge di Chaufontaine, ed. 1878

Despite the variety of spellings, some conventions were followed by many of these early texts. For example, ⟨j⟩ or ⟨g⟩ (before e and i) were often used for the sound [dʒ], and similarly ⟨ch⟩ represented [tʃ], while later orthographies would use ⟨dj⟩ and ⟨tch⟩ respectively. Many Walloon texts of this era also continued the usage of traditional digraphs such as ⟨xh⟩.

The 19th century saw a flourishing of Walloon literature. In 1856 the Société liégeois de Littérature wallonne (Liège Society of Walloon Literature) was founded, later renamed the Société de Langue et de Littérature wallonnes (Society of Walloon Language and Literature, SLLW). The Society promoted artistic works in the Walloon language as well as works of philology and dialectology. From the beginning, the SLLW was interested in solving the issue that there was no unified system of spelling for the Walloon language. Several orthographies were proposed, such as the more phonemic orthography of Charles-Nicolas Simonon (using such novel letters as ⟨ɹ⟩ and ⟨ñ⟩) and the orthography of Nicolas Pietkin, which made extensive analogy with French orthography. The most influential proposal, however, was that of dialectologist Jules Feller, the creator of the Feller system.

=== Feller System ===
At the turn of the 20th century Jules Feller proposed a new orthography for the Walloon language. His paper, entitled Essai d'orthographe wallonne (Essay on Walloon Orthography), was submitted to the Liège Society of Walloon Literature in 1899 and published one year later in 1900 by the Society. His proposal balanced the principles of «phonétisme» and «analogie» - trying to faithfully represent the sound of the language while also referencing the dominant model of French orthography which most literate Walloons were familiar with.

The Society adopted Feller's orthography and, in 1903, tasked three of its members with writing a comprehensive Walloon dictionary. Jules Feller, Jean Haust, and Auguste Doutrepont collected 300,000 records over the next 25 years but the envisioned Dictionnaire général de la Langue wallonne was never completed. Despite these difficulties, what became known as the Système Feller was adopted throughout the region, and the majority of Walloon publications for the next century were written in some variation of Feller's orthography.

=== Common Walloon ===
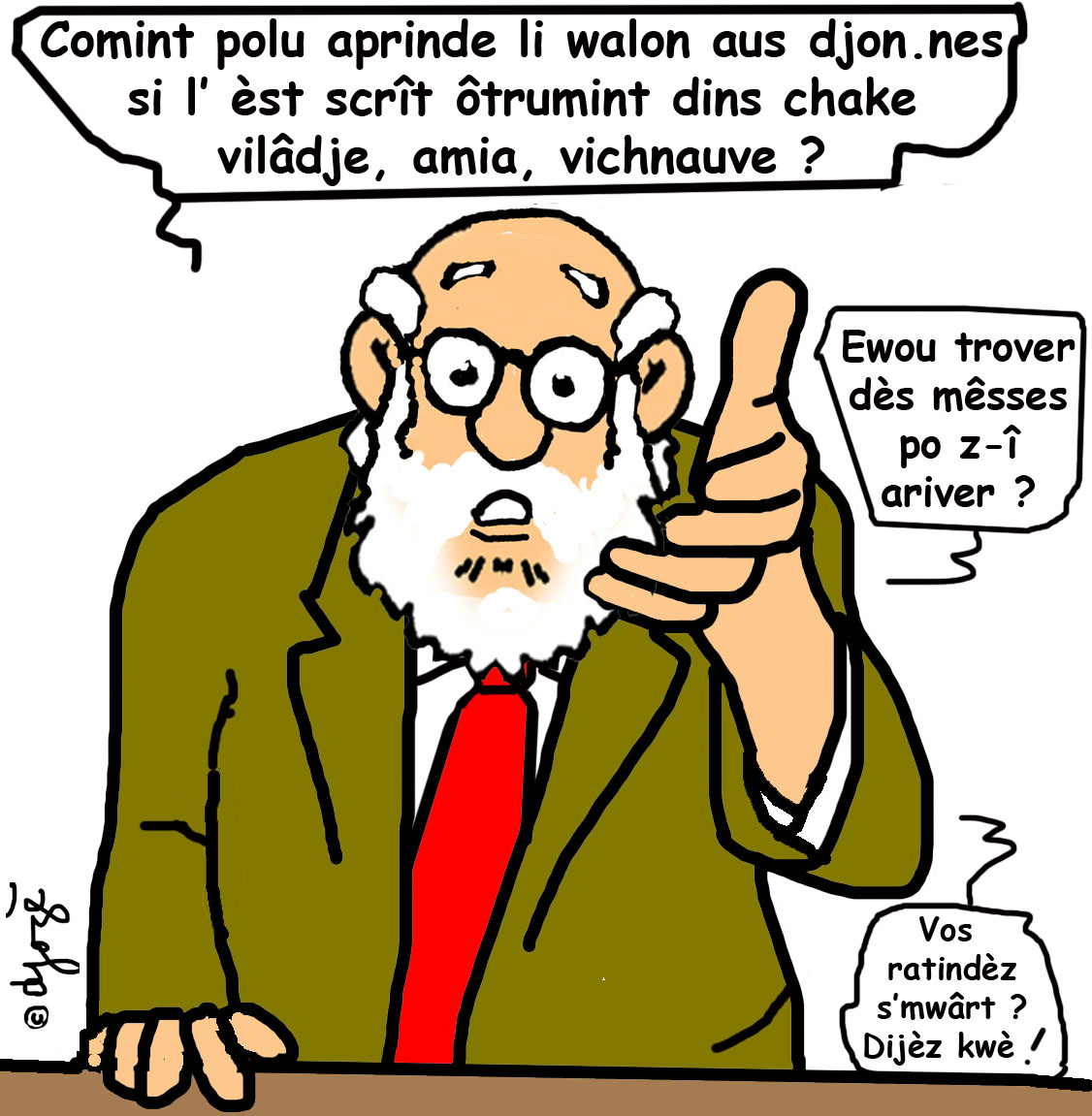
A comic written in Common Walloon

Over the course of the 20th century, Walloon society transitioned rapidly from being primarily monolingual in the local dialects (such as Walloon, Lorrain, or Picard) to being primarily monolingual in French. In response to this new social reality, a group of Walloon activists began imagining a new common orthography in the late 1980s and early 1990s: a written "koiné" for the Walloon language. Inspired by the examples of other regional languages like Romansh, Breton, and Occitan, the rfondeus (initial creators of the orthography) sought to unify the spelling of words across the region. During the 1990s, they formulated a new proposal, the rifondou walon, referred to in English as the "normalised spelling", "Common Written Walloon", or "Common Walloon".

Common Walloon has been met with some resistance, notably in the 1996 article Les planificateurs linguistiques au chevet du wallon by Jean Lechanteur, published by the Société de Langue et de Littérature wallonnes.

The orthography has a strong presence on the internet, with the Walloon Wikipedia and Walloon Wiktionary both written using the rifondou normalized spelling.

== Graphemes ==
The table below shows letters, digraphs, and trigraphs (collectively referred to as graphemes) used by the Feller system and Common Walloon. The second and third columns show the sounds which are represented, transcribed in the International Phonetic Alphabet. Note that certain graphemes represent many different sounds in the Common Walloon alphabet, while in the Feller system most graphemes correspond to a single sound.

Grapheme	Feller System	Common Walloon	Example	Notes
A a	[a]		gade [gat] (goat)	
À à	[a]		là [la]	Only used in Feller by some authors who use it by analogy with French
Â â	[aː]		diâle [djaːl] (devil)	In Common ⟨å⟩ or ⟨a⟩
Å å	[ɔː]	[ɔː/oː/ɑː]	djåzer [d͡ʒɔːˈze/d͡ʒaːˈze] (to speak)	The pronunciation [d͡ʒaːˈze] would be written djâzer in Feller
AE ae		[a/ɛ]	glaece [glas/glɛs] (ice)	In Feller glace ou glèce
AI ai		[eː/ɛː]	mwaisse [mwɛːs/mɛːs/meːs] (master)	In Feller ⟨ê⟩ is used for [ɛː] and ⟨é⟩ for [eː], producing possible spellings: mêsse, mwêsse, mésse, maisse, maîsse
AN an	[ɑ̃]	[ɑ̃/ɔ̃]	blanc [blã] (white)	
B b	[b]		bén [bẽ] (well, good)	
C c	[k/s]		crole [kʀɔl] (curl of hair)	
Ç ç	[s]		çoula [suˈla] (that)	
CH ch	[ʃ]	[ʃ] (rare)	chal [ʃal] (here)	In Common ⟨ci⟩, ⟨cy⟩, ⟨xh⟩, ⟨sch⟩, or ⟨sh⟩. The example word would be written cial [ʃal] or [sjal]
D d	[d]		wårder [wɔːʀˈde/waːʀˈde] (to keep)	The pronunciation [waːʀˈde] would be written wârder in Feller
DJ dj	[dʒ]		djin [d͡ʒɛ̃] (person)	
E e	silent letter	[ɛ]	efant [ɛˈfã] (child)	
È è	[ɛ]			
É é	[e/eː]	[e/iː]	pés [pe] (cow's udder)	In Common, syllable-final é can also be pronounced [iː]; thus the Common ceréjhe (cherry) could be written cèréhe, cèrîhe, cèlîhe, cèrîje,... in Feller
Ê ê	[ɛː]			
E̊ e̊	[ə]		me̊ [mə] (me)	Only used in Feller in some dialects, sometimes Ë ë is used instead due to difficulty.
EA ea		[ja/eː/ɛː]	bea [bja/beː/bɛː] (beautiful)	In Feller bia, bé, bê
ÉN én	[ẽ]	[ẽ/ɛ̃]	tchén [tʃẽ/tʃɛ̃] (dog)	In Feller tchén, tchîⁿ, tchin
EU eu	[ø/œ/ə]	[øː/œː/ø/œ/ə]	djeu [d͡ʒø/d͡ʒøː] (game)	In Feller the vowel length is noted, see ⟨eû⟩ below
EÛ eû	[øː/œː]		djeû [d͡ʒøː] (game)	In Common ⟨eu⟩
EY ey		[ɛj/ɛːj/iːj/iː]	åjhey [ɔːˈʒɛj] (easy)	In Feller ⟨èy⟩ or ⟨îy⟩: åhèy, âhèy, åhêye, åhî, âhî, auji, aujîye, aujîle,...
F f	[f]		filozofe [fi.lɔˈzɔf] (philosopher)	
G g	[g]		gueuye [gøːj] (face)	In Feller gueûye
GN gn	[ɲ]		agnon [aˈɲõ] (onion)	
H h	[h]	[h] or silent	hoye [hɔj] (coal)	In Feller hoye, oye, ouye
HY hy	[ç]		pèhyon [pɛ.çɔ̃] (fish)	In Common ⟨jh⟩, ⟨sch⟩, or ⟨xh⟩
I i	[i/ɪ]	[iː/i/ɪ]	pitit [pi.ti] (little)	Indicates the elidable weak vowel in Common, which has a wide variety of realizations depending on region; pitit, li ptit (little, the little) in Feller could be written pitit, putit, pëtit, pètit, peutit,...; li/lu/lë/èl/... p’tit
Ì ì	[ɪ]		pìtìt [pɪ.tɪ] (little)	Only used in Feller in some dialects.
Î î	[iː]		pî [piː] (foot)	In Common the circumflex is not used unless the ⟨i⟩ is before a voiceless consonant, otherwise it is automatically long: Lidje [liːt͡ʃ] (Liège), in Feller Lîdje
IN in	[ɛ̃]		rinde [ʀɛ̃t] (to return)	
J j	[ʒ]	[ʒ] (rare)	jate [ʒat] (cup)	Very rare in Common as this sound is either written ⟨jh⟩ or is from a foreign borrowing, in which case it is usually written ⟨dj⟩ (for example in djate [dʒat])
JH jh		[h/ʒ/ç]	prijhon [pʀiː.ʒɔ̃/pʀiː.hɔ̃/pʀiː.çɔ̃] (prison)	In Feller prîjon, prîhon, prîhyon
K k	[k]		stoumak [stuˈmak] (stomach)	
L l	[l]		lére [leːʀ/liːʀ] (to read)	The pronunciation [liːʀ] would be written lîre in Feller
M m	[m]		mwin [mwɛ̃/mɛ̃] (hand)	The pronunciation [mɛ̃] would be written min in Feller
N n	[n]		nawe [naw] (lazy)	
O o	[ɔ]		soris [sɔʀi] (mouse)	
Ô ô	[oː]	[oː/õ/ɔ̃/ʊː]	rôze [ʀoːs/ʀõs]	In Feller the nasalization is noted as rôⁿze or ronze
Ö ö	[ɔː]		röze [ʀɔːs]	Only used in Feller in some dialects.
OE oe		[wɛ/ø/ɛ/œ]	moes [mwɛ/møː] (month)	In Feller mwès, meûs
OI oi		[wa/wɛ/oː/ʊː]	moirt [mwɛʀ/mwaːʀ/moːʀ] (dead)	In Feller mwért, mwèrt, mwârt, mwart, môrt, moûrt
ON on	[ɔ̃]		djondou [d͡ʒõˈdu] (touched)	
OU ou	[u]		atouwer [a.tuˈwe] (to tutoie, to address someone informally)	
OÛ oû	[uː]		noû [nuː] (new)	
P p	[p]		aprinde [aˈpʀɛ̃t] (to learn)	
Q q			qwè [kwɛ] (what)	Non-standard [k], the example word is more often written cwè
R r	[ʀ]		arester [a.ʀɛsˈte] (to stop)	In Feller arèster
S s	[s]		sûner [syː.ne] (to ooze)	
SS ss	[s]		dissu [diˈsy] (on top of)	
SCH sch		[h/ʃ/ç/sk]	scheter [skɛ.te/ʃɛ.te/hɛ.te/çɛ.te] (to break)	In Feller (è)skèter, chèter, hèter, hyèter
SH sh		[ʃ/s]	shijh [siːh/ʃiːʒ] (six)	In Feller sîh, chîj
T t	[t]		tins [tɛ̃] (time)	Even though the pronunciation is the same everywhere, in Feller there are variants: tins, timp, timps
TCH tch	[tʃ]		tchant [tʃã] (song)	
U u	[y]		pus [py] (more)	
Ù ù	[ʏ]		pùs [pʏ] (more)	Only used in Feller in some dialects.
Û û	[yː]		ût [yːt] (eight)	
Un un	[œ̃]		djun [d͡ʒœ̃] (June)	Very rare sound in Walloon; djun and brun are basically the only words which use it
V v	[v]		vint [vɛ̃] (wind)	
W w	[w]		walon [wa.lõ] (Walloon)	
X x	[ks/gz]		taxi [tak.si] (taxi)	Not used in Common (the example word is written tacsi), rare in Feller
XH xh		[h/ʃ/ç/x]	pexhon [pɛ.ʃɔ̃/pɛ.hɔ̃/pɛ.çɔ̃] (fish)	In Feller pèchon/pèhon/pèhyon
Y y	[j]		yebe [jɛp] (grass)	In Feller the palatalization is sometimes noted, giving Feller spellings such as yèbe, jèbe, êrb
Z z	[z]		zûner [zyːne] (to buzz)	

=== Diasystems ===
A word written using Common Walloon is spelled the same across the whole of the language area, regardless of the speakers pronunciation. This is accomplished with the use of diasystems (in Walloon betchfessîs scrijhas), which are always spelled the same but are pronounced differently depending on the region.

Rifondou	Système Feller			
—	Liège (east-walloon)	Bastogne (south-walloon)	Namur (center-walloon)	Charleroi (west-walloon)
xh pexhon	h pèhon [pɛhɔ̃]	ch pèchon [pɛʃɔ̃]		
jh prijhon	h prîhon [pʀiːhɔ̃]	j prîjon [pʀiːʒɔ̃]		
sch schoûter	h hoûter [huːte]	ch choûter [ʃuːte]		sk, esk skoûter, eskoûter [skuːte], [ɛskuːte]
sh shonner	s son.ner [sɔ̃ne]	ch chon.ner [ʃɔ̃ne]		
å åbe, måjhon(e)	å, o åbe, mohon(e) [ɔːp], [mɔhɔ̃] ([mɔhɔn])	â â(r)be, mâjon(e) [aːp], [maːʒɔ̃] ([maːʒɔn])	â, ô âbe, ôbe, môjone [aːp], [oːp], [moːʒɔn]	â, ô â(r)be, môjo [aː(ʀ)p], [moːʒɔ]
ea tchapea	ê tchapê [t͡ʃapɛː]		ia tchapia [t͡ʃapja]	
ae djaene, bataedje	è djène, batèdje [d͡ʒɛn], [batɛt͡ʃ]		a djane, batadje [d͡ʒan], [batat͡ʃ]	a, â djane, batâdje [d͡ʒan], [bataːt͡ʃ]
oe noer	eu neûr [nœːʁ]	wa nwâr [nwaːʁ]	wè nwêr [nwɛːʁ]	
én vént	in, é, i, ié vin, vé, vi, vié [vɛ̃], [ve], [vɪ], [vi], [vje]			in, é, i, ié væ̃, vin, vé, vi, vié [vɛ̃], [ve], [vɪ], [vi], [vje], [væ̃]
ai	ê			é
oi	ô, oû	a		è, é
