= Stoumont =

Municipality in Liège Province, Wallonia, Belgium

- Municipality
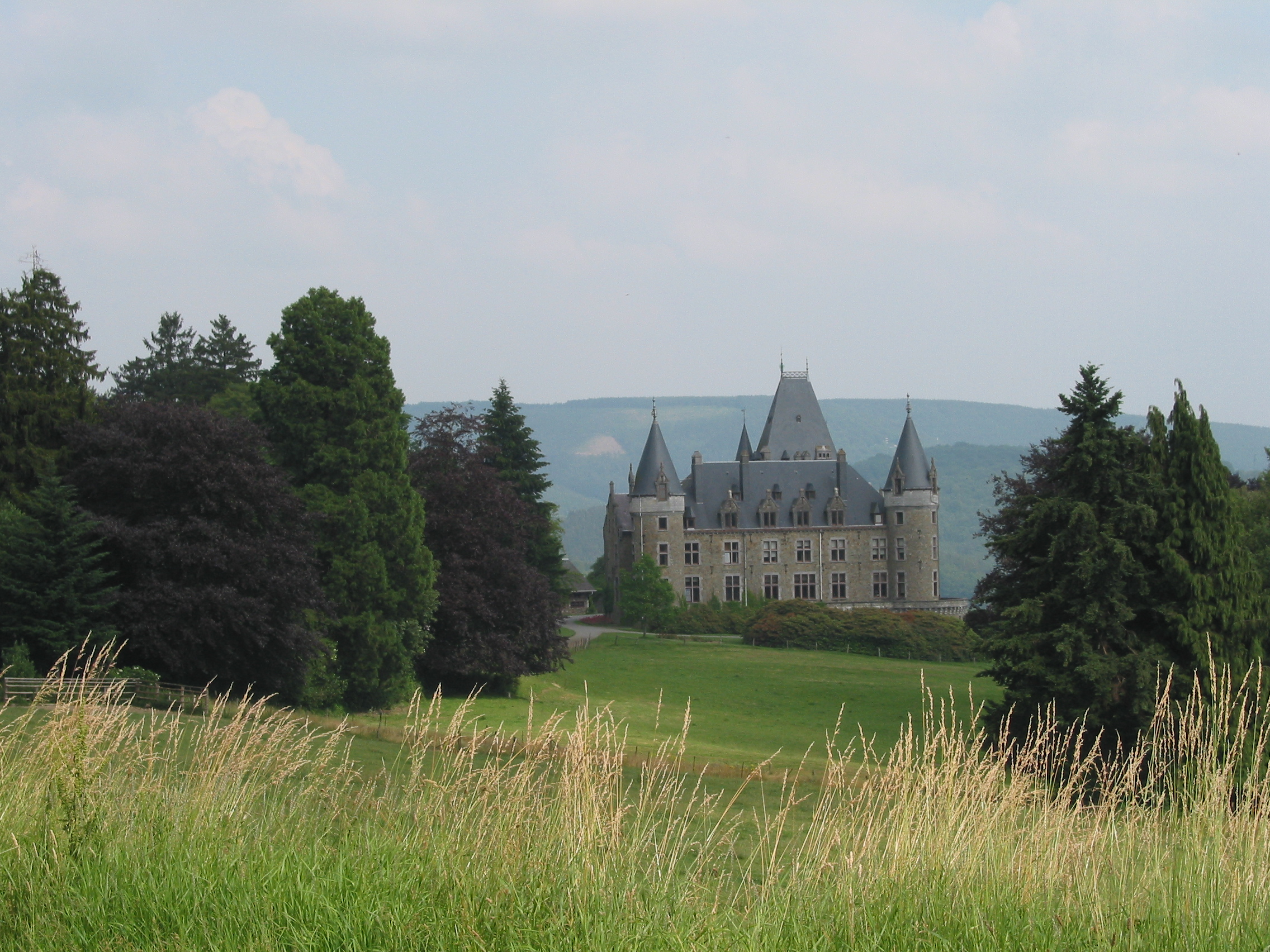

- Flag Coat of arms

- Location of Stoumont in the province of Liège
- Interactive map of Stoumont
- Location in Belgium
- Coordinates: 50°25′N 05°48′E
- Country: Belgium
- Community: French Community
- Region: Wallonia
- Province: Liège
- Arrondissement: Verviers

Government
  - Mayor: Didier Gilkinet
  - Governing party: VivrEnsemble

Area
  - Total: 108.54 km^{2} (41.91 sq mi)

Population (2018-01-01)
  - Total: 3,104
  - Density: 28.60/km^{2} (74.07/sq mi)
- Postal codes: 4987
- NIS code: 63075
- Area codes: 080
- Website: www.stoumont.be

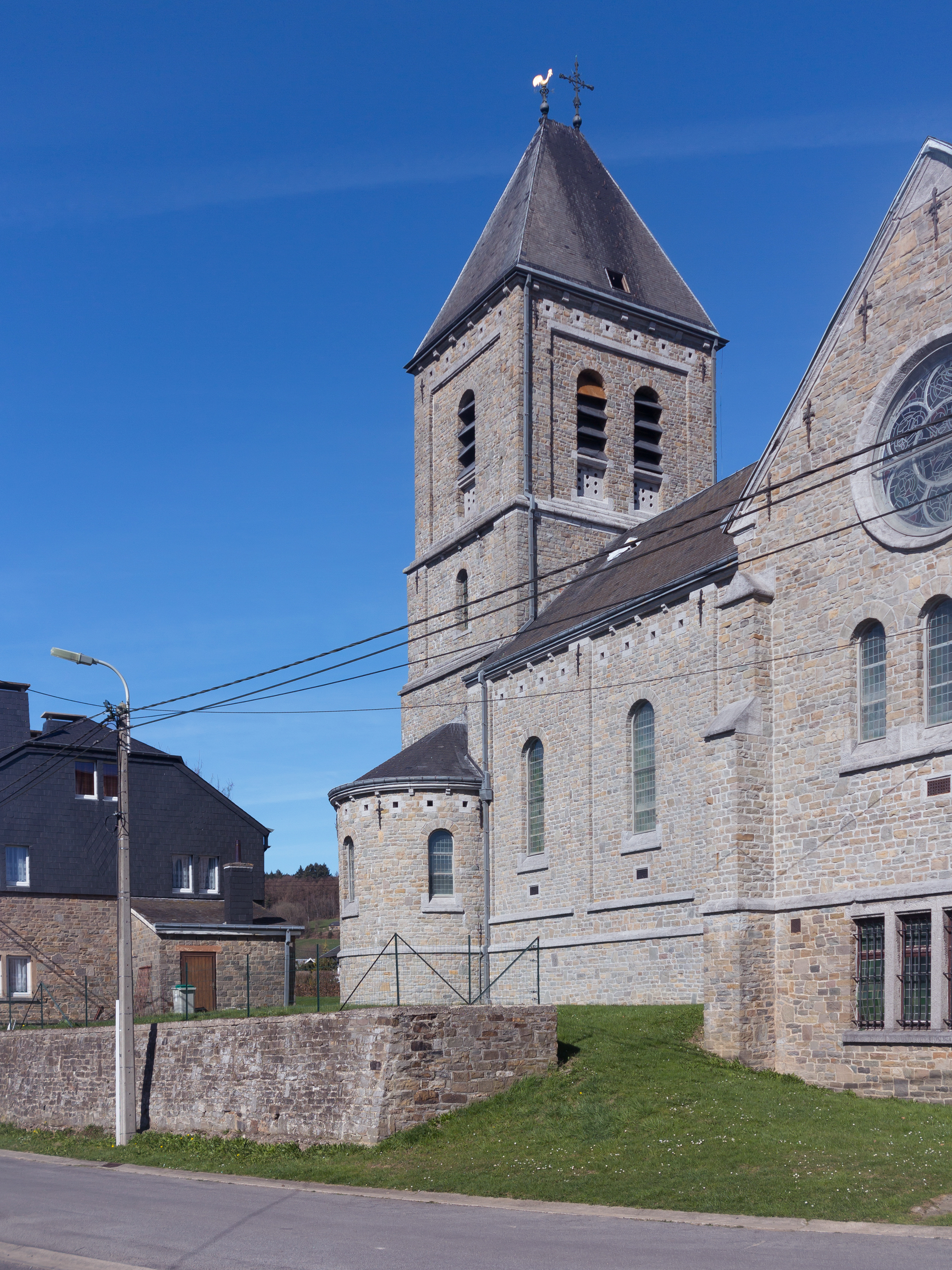
Church: l'église Saint-Hubert

Stoumont (French pronunciation: [stumɔ̃]) is a municipality of Wallonia located in the province of Liège, Belgium.

On January 1, 2006, Stoumont had a total population of 3,006. The total area is 108.45 km^{2} which gives a population density of 28 inhabitants per km^{2}.

The municipality consists of the following districts: Chevron, La Gleize, Lorcé, Rahier, and Stoumont.

== See also ==
- List of protected heritage sites in Stoumont
