= List of protected heritage sites in Stoumont =

This table shows an overview of the protected heritage sites in the Walloon town Stoumont. This list is part of Belgium's national heritage.

Object	Year/architect	Town/section	Address	Coordinates	Number^{?}	Image
farmhouse ^{(nl)} ^{(fr)}		Stoumont	Village, n°49	50.407609°N 5.804979°E	63075-CLT-0001-01 Info	
farmhouse ^{(nl)} ^{(fr)}		Stoumont	Village n°58	50.408522°N 5.806786°E	63075-CLT-0002-01 Info	
Chapel Sainte-Anne and ensemble of the chapel and its surroundings ^{(nl)} ^{(fr)}		Stoumont	route d'Amblève	50.410657°N 5.828847°E	63075-CLT-0003-01 Info	
Fagne de Pansîre ^{(nl)} ^{(fr)}		Stoumont		50.432000°N 5.802750°E	63075-CLT-0004-01 Info	
House: walls and roofs ^{(nl)} ^{(fr)}		Stoumont	buurtschap Monceau n°s 1 en 2	50.392730°N 5.820982°E	63075-CLT-0005-01 Info	
Chapel of Saint-Gilles and the surrounding beech trees ^{(nl)} ^{(fr)}		Stoumont		50.374362°N 5.739964°E	63075-CLT-0006-01 Info	Kapel Saint-Gilles en de omringende beuken
Expansion of the site formed by the chapel of Saint-Gilles and the surrounding beeches at a place called "Le Caty" ^{(nl)} ^{(fr)}		Stoumont		50.374720°N 5.740052°E	63075-CLT-0008-01 Info	
farmhouse ^{(nl)} ^{(fr)}		Stoumont	n°17, Borgoumont	50.423816°N 5.860175°E	63075-CLT-0011-01 Info	
farmhouse ^{(nl)} ^{(fr)}		Stoumont	n°15, Borgoumont	50.424216°N 5.860049°E	63075-CLT-0012-01 Info	
farmhouse ^{(nl)} ^{(fr)}		Stoumont	n°13, Cheneux	50.395290°N 5.816502°E	63075-CLT-0013-01 Info	
Ensemble of the church Saint-Georges and its environment ^{(nl)} ^{(fr)}		Stoumont		50.417436°N 5.732985°E	63075-CLT-0015-01 Info	
Ensemble of the mill "Moulin Mignolet" and the scenic location ^{(nl)} ^{(fr)}		Stoumont	n° 85	50.412079°N 5.742006°E	63075-CLT-0016-01 Info	
Ensemble of the church Saint-Paul and the old cemetery ^{(nl)} ^{(fr)}		Stoumont		50.385921°N 5.777857°E	63075-CLT-0017-01 Info	Ensemble van de kerk Saint-Paul en de oude begraafplaats
Church of Saint-Paul ^{(nl)} ^{(fr)}		Stoumont		50.385938°N 5.778252°E	63075-CLT-0018-01 Info	
Genevrière à Court ^{(nl)} ^{(fr)}		Stoumont		50.442780°N 5.866834°E	63075-CLT-0020-01 Info	
Wall of the cemetery around the church Saint-Paul (already classified) and the remains of the fortified house and the ensemble of the church and the cemetery (including the immediate vicinity are already classified as site), the fortified house and surrounding areas ^{(nl)} ^{(fr)}		Stoumont		50.386037°N 5.779105°E	63075-CLT-0021-01 Info	Muur van het kerkhof rond de kerk Saint-Paul (al geclassificeerd) en de overblijfselen van het versterkte huis en het ensemble van de kerk en de begraafplaats (inclusief de directe omgeving zijn reeds geclassificeerd als site), de versterkte woning en de omliggende gebieden
Ensemble of the castle and its surroundings Froidcourt ^{(nl)} ^{(fr)}		Stoumont	route d'Amblève n°8	50.406574°N 5.816140°E	63075-CLT-0022-01 Info	Ensemble van het kasteel van Froidcourt en diens omgeving
Farm: facades and roofs and the ensemble of the farm, the fountain and the valley of the stream of the forest Mathy ^{(nl)} ^{(fr)}		Stoumont	n°66, Chession	50.407099°N 5.752437°E	63075-CLT-0023-01 Info	
House facades, gables and roof ^{(nl)} ^{(fr)}		Stoumont	n°46, Exbomont	50.423141°N 5.899342°E	63075-CLT-0024-01 Info	
Facades of the stud farm from the 16th century and the expansion of the 19th century and its coverage with cherbains and cwerbas, all located at a place called "Martinsville." Establishment of zone protection ^{(nl)} ^{(fr)}		Stoumont	nr. 20	50.388123°N 5.786213°E	63075-CLT-0026-01 Info	
Land formed by the expansion of the site of the Fonds de Quarreux Stoumont and Aywaille ^{(nl)} ^{(fr)}		Stoumont		50.430472°N 5.727693°E	63075-CLT-0027-01 Info	
Land formed by the expansion of the site of the Fonds de Quarreux Stoumont and Aywaille ^{(nl)} ^{(fr)}		Stoumont		50.430472°N 5.727693°E	63075-PEX-0001-01 Info	

== See also ==
- List of protected heritage sites in Liège (province)
- Stoumont
