= Lorcé =

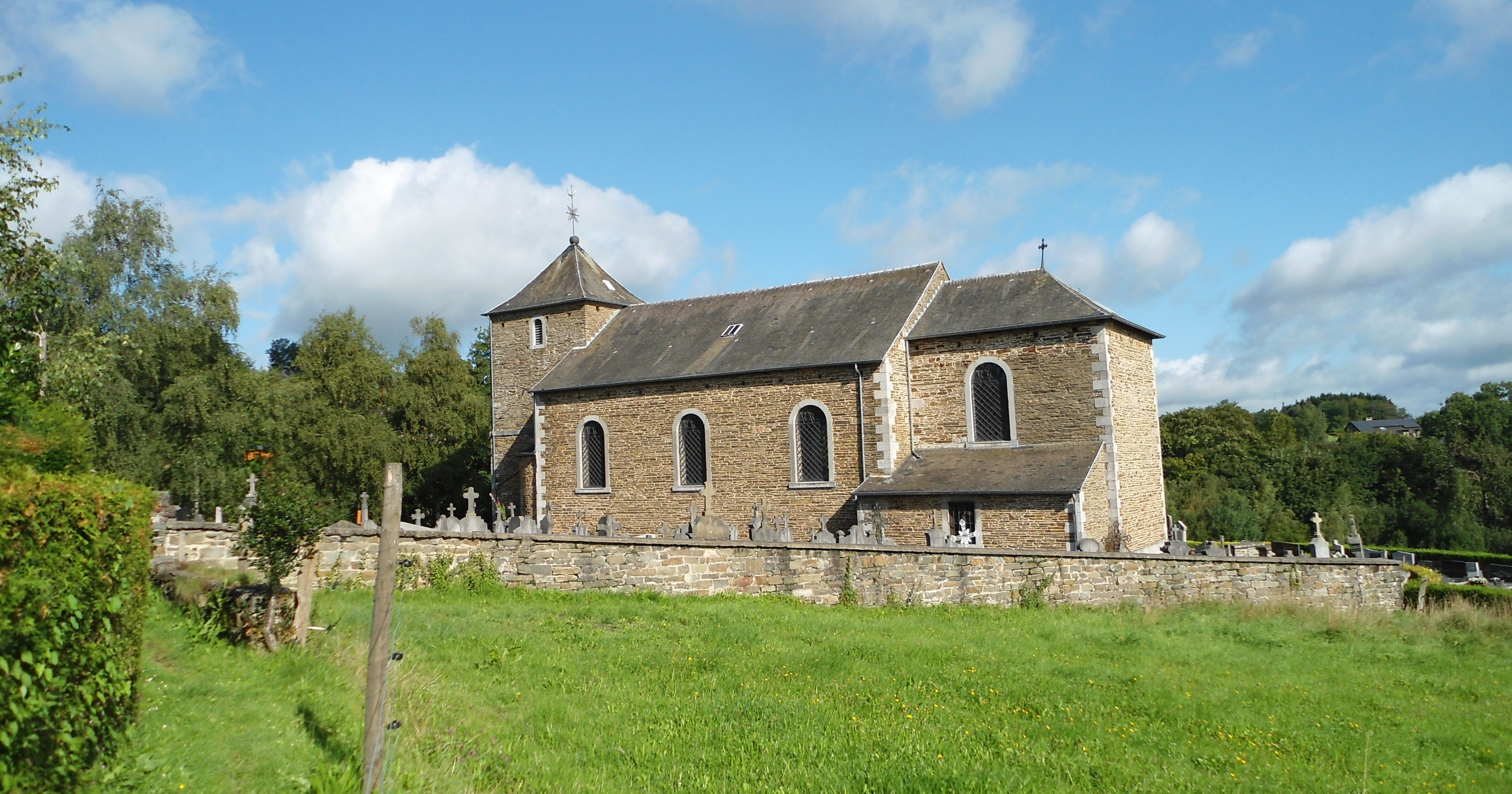
- Lorcé, village church

- Location within Belgium Location within Europe
- Coordinates: 50°25′00″N 05°44′04″E
- Country: Belgium
- Region: Wallonia
- Province: Liège
- Municipality: Stoumont

Lorcé is a village and district of the municipality of Stoumont, located in the province of Liège in Wallonia, Belgium.

The village dates back to at least the Middle Ages, when it was part of the land of the Princely Abbey of Stavelot-Malmedy. The village church was built in the 18th century, replacing an earlier edifice and possibly on the same site as a Gallo-Roman temple. It was heavily rebuilt in a Romanesque Revival style in 1854 and contains several historical furnishings. There are also two historical mills in Lorcé, from the 19th and 17th century.
