= Jules Feller =

Belgian academic and Walloon philologist

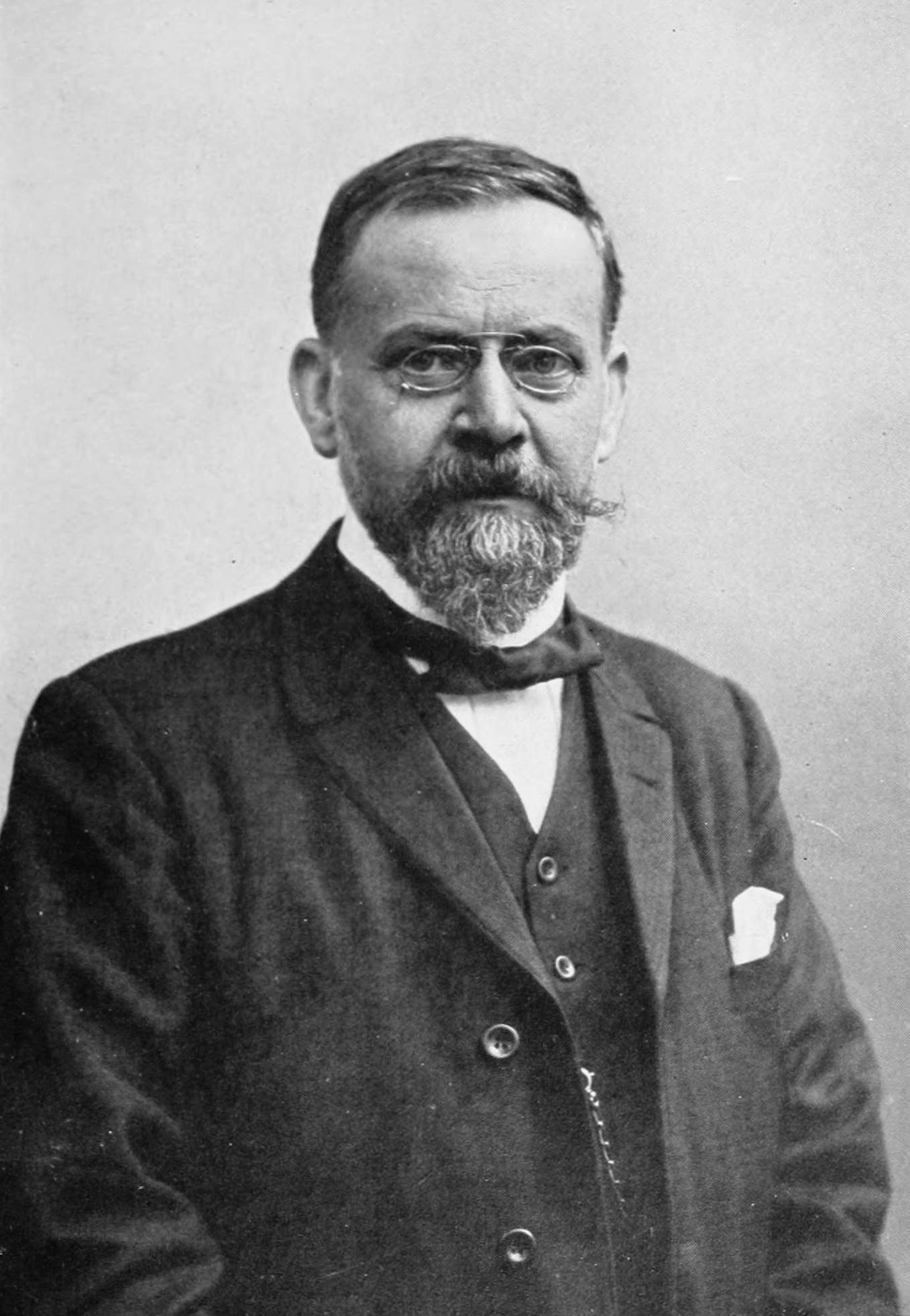
- Jules Feller, 1912
- Born: November 4, 1859; Roubaix
- Died: April 29, 1940; Verviers
- Writing career
- Language: French and Walloon
- Genre: Linguistics
- Notable work: Essai d'orthographe wallonne, 1900; Notes de philologie wallonne, 1912

Signature
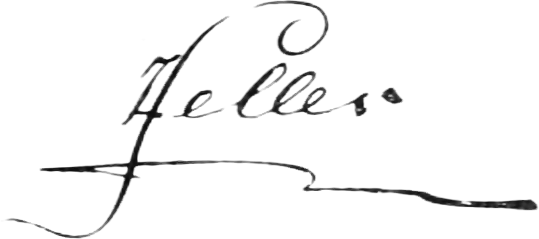

Jules Feller (4 November 1859 – 29 April 1940) was a Belgian professor and a philologist of the Walloon language.

== Biography ==
Jules Feller created the Feller system of spelling for the Walloon language, and advocated for the co-teaching of Walloon and French in Wallonia. A modified version of his orthographic system is also the basis for writing used for the Picard language, known as the Feller-Carton system, and developed by Fernand Carton in 1963.

He represented Verviers in the Walloon Assembly from 1919 until his death. He was a member of the Royal Academy of French Language and Literature in Belgium.
