= Rahier =

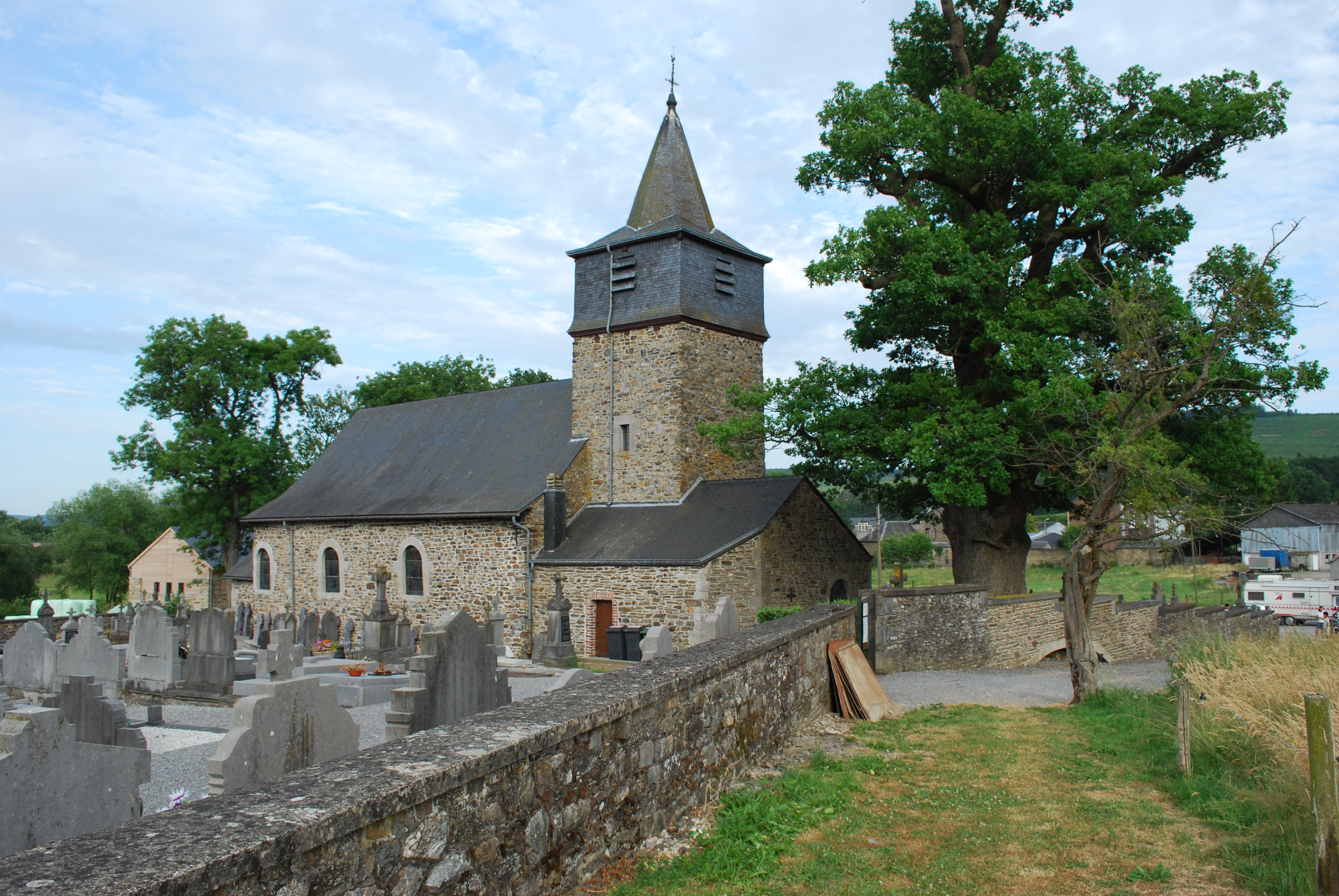
- Rahier

- Location within Belgium Location within Europe
- Coordinates: 50°23′08″N 05°46′41″E
- Country: Belgium
- Region: Wallonia
- Province: Liège
- Municipality: Stoumont

Rahier is a village and district of the municipality of Stoumont, located in the province of Liège in Wallonia, Belgium.

The village is mentioned in 1131 in a charter belonging to the Princely Abbey of Stavelot-Malmedy. The village economy has traditionally been based on agriculture, though some mining did take place during the 19th century. The village church, as well as a 17th-century château, are listed historic buildings.
