= Noertrange =

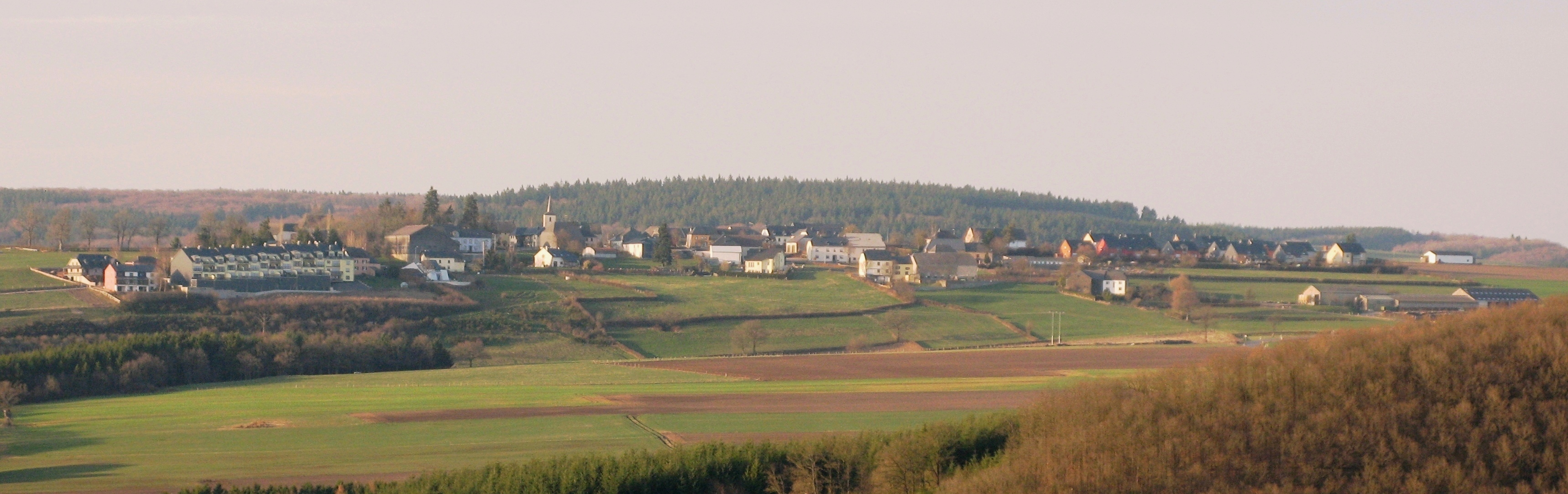
A view of Noertrange

Noertrange (Luxembourgish: Näertreg, German: Noertringen) is a small town in the commune of Winseler, in north-western Luxembourg. As of September 2026, the town has a population of 372.

Noertrange is home to an aerodrome.49.98095°N 5.91837°E
