= Sonlez =

Village in Luxembourg

Coordinates: 49°58′N 5°50′E

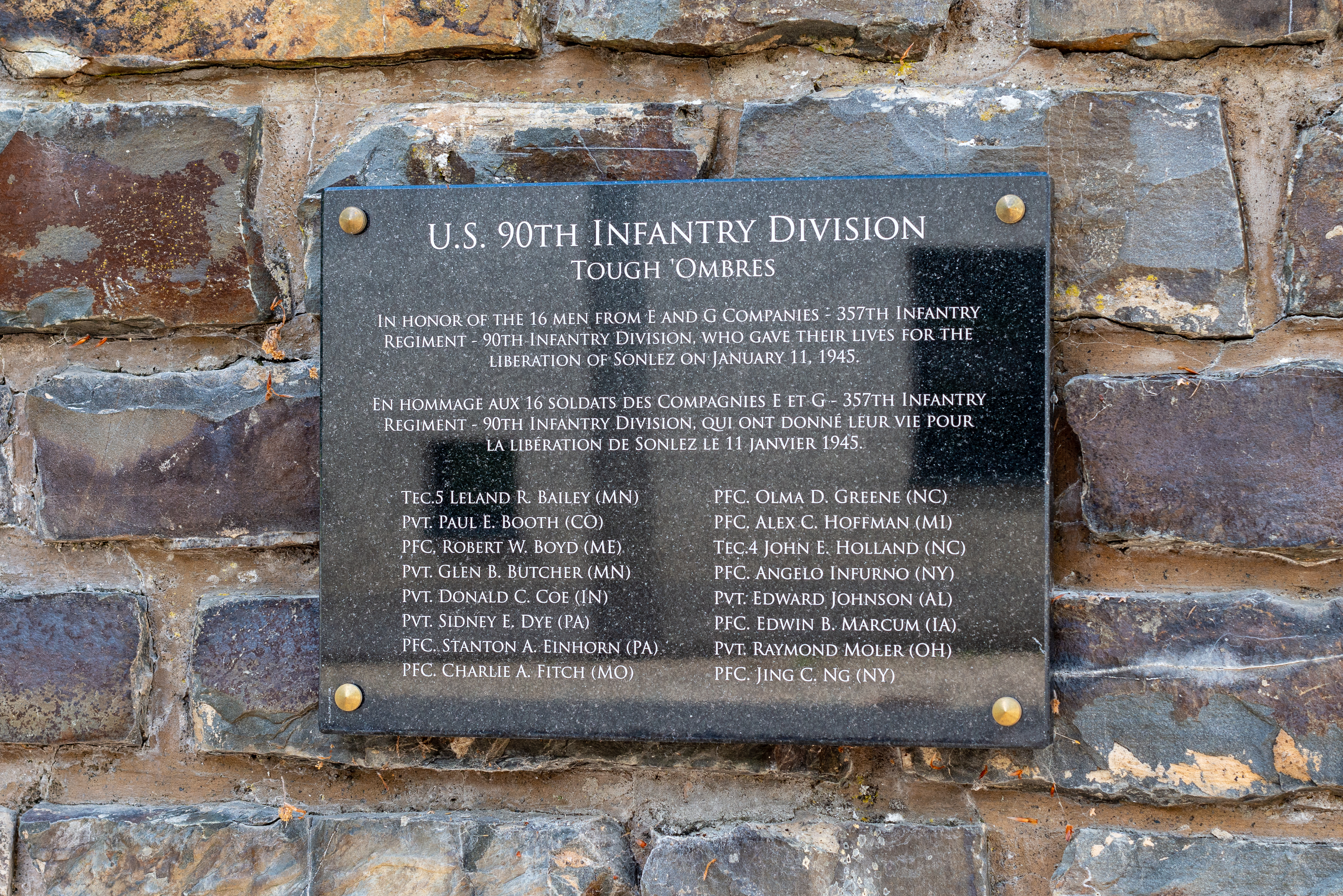
Memorial to the 16 Tough 'Ombres killed in action during the Battle of the Bulge in Sonlez.

Sonlez (Luxembourgish: Soller, German: Soller) is a village in Luxembourg.

== Location and population ==
It is situated in the commune of Winseler, in north-western Luxembourg. As of September 2026, the village has a population of 98. It is situated between Tarchamps (West) and Doncols (East)

== Linguistic features ==
Sonlez is known as an historically Walloon-speaking village, similarly to Doncols. Unlike neighbouring Doncols, however, its German and Luxembourgish spellings are identical.

== See also ==
- Doncols#Historical and linguistic backgrounds
