= Louis Remacle =

Belgian linguistics professor

Louis Remacle (30 September 1910 in La Gleize, Belgium – 10 May 1997) was a linguistics professor at the University of Liège who contributed in particular to the recognition and study of the Walloon language. He also published a number of innovative collections of poetry in his local dialect.

== Life ==
Louis Remacle, the son of Eugène Remacle, a customs official on the German-Belgian border, was born at the farm of his mother's relatives in La Gleize, to the north of the town of Stavelot. Until he was nine, however, he was brought up south of there in the village of Wanne. His schooling was in Stavelot, after which he studied at the University of Liège. There he had the fortune to be taught by the language specialist Jean Haust, in whose footsteps he followed: as a dialectologist himself, as professor at the university and as a member of the Belgian Academy, to which he was elected in 1948.

Remacle identified particularly with the dialect of La Gleize, to which he devoted several studies, beginning with Le Parler de La Gleize (1937), which received the prize for that year awarded by the Belgian Academy. In addition, he made substantial contributions over the years to the study of the Walloon language, first with Le Problème d’ancien wallon (1948) and culminating in La différenciation dialectale de la Belgique romane avant 1600 (1992). These noted that numerous developments considered typical of Walloon began appearing in written documents between the 8th and 12th centuries, but that evidence of the differentiated spoken tongue only emerged in the 16th century. Also included in the field of his study were the differences between the dialects across individual areas, which led to his initiating the linguistic atlas of Wallonia (l'Atlas linguistique de la Wallonie), a project begun in 1953 that continued under other editors into the new century.

In recognition of his work in historical linguistics, Remacle was awarded the Francqui Prize in 1956. Though he retired from the university officially in 1977, he was made a professor emeritus and continued his research.

== Poetry ==
Although the writing of his own dialect poetry only occupied spare moments in his busy life, that too was given early recognition. Following publication locally of Frâdjèlès tchansons (Faint songs, Stavelot 1930), he submitted anonymously the manuscript of Lès fleûrs du l' vôye (Flowers along the way) to the panel of the Prix Biennal de Littérature Wallonne and was awarded the prize in 1933. Further poems appeared over some fifty years in various magazines and anthologies, and three more collections were published: Â tchèstê d' poûssîre ("The castle of dust", Gothier, Liège, 1946); Fagne ("Wolds", Cahiers Wallons, Namur, 1969); Mwète-Fontin.ne ("Dry spring", Cahiers Wallons, Namur, 1974). The totality of his poetry was not published collectively until the celebration of Remacle's centenary in 2010 by the fr:Société de langue et de littérature wallonnes.

One reason given by Remacle for writing poetry at all was that it provided texts which would preserve examples of the language at a time when dialect usage was plainly in retreat. Another, shared in common with other dialect writers across Belgium, was the realisation that the particular qualities of their language presented them with a unique resource for renewing the literary idiom. To begin with, there is the vocabulary of the Belgian Ardennes itself as an extension of the landscape in which the poems are set, that by its specificity neutralises the Latin tendency to generalisation. Though Remacle was of a melancholy cast of mind who tended to locate his experience of happiness in the past - a traditional enough theme at any period - what he brought to this expression of loss, in addition to the precision of his language, was the introduction of dream images as an alienating device. One responds, therefore, not so much to the underlying emotion as to the unfamiliarity of its expression. He was also a master of prosody, endlessly varying his preferred form of the twelve-lined poems he called douzains, and in this way once more renewed his means.

As well as the various essays devoted to Remacle's work in the centenary homage, there were two other literary items. One was a setting of five of his poems by Marc Duysincx. Also there is a collection of the twenty or so poems that Remacle wrote in French from 1926 to 1952, none of them previously published, although he may have been contemplating their publication under the title Chants inactuels. Their editor, Jean Lechanteur, comments that in some ways they echo themes and sentiments of the poems in Walloon, as in "Waiting", that dates from February 1952.

To await the impalpable silence so…

Despite winter and the weariness
that weighs and lengthens the horizons,
and this snow where footsteps are unmade,
until there heaps within my heart again
a thousandfold the voicing of my old regrets…

But from the basin of my heart time flows,
and this I know, when evening and the hour
have scoured thin your tocsin, O my voices,
then I shall feel shifting about me,
as if the slow flakes were drowsing
into drifts, the snowfall of silence.

== Bibliography ==
- Lechanteur, Jean. "Louis Remacle: Membre de l'Académie", ARLLFB
- Willems, Martine (ed.). Hommage à Louis Remacle (1910-1997), SLLW (2011)
