= Doncols =

Village in Winseler, Luxembourg

Coordinates: 49°58′N 5°50′E

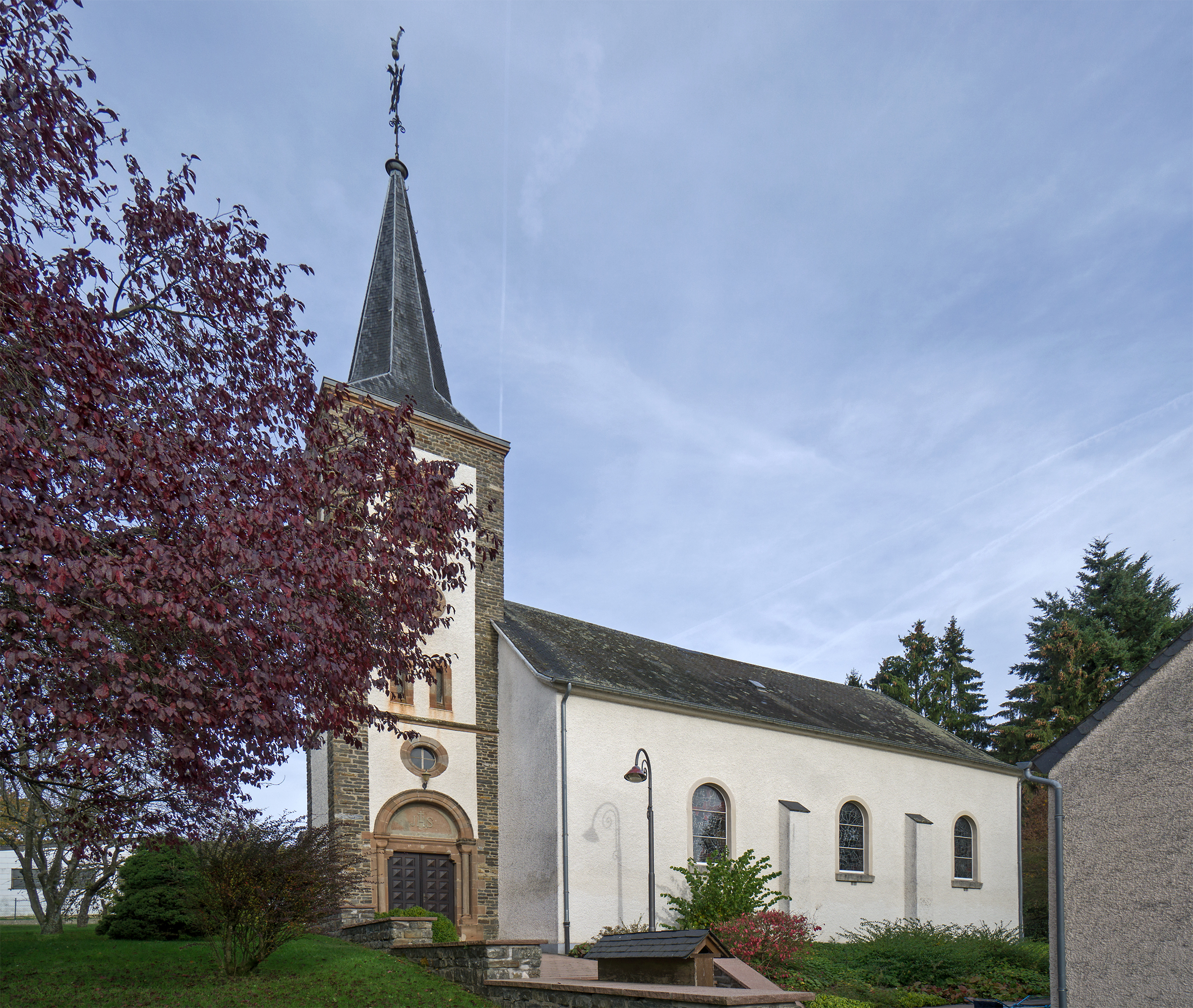
Church in Doncols

Doncols (Luxembourgish: Donkels, German: Donkols) is a village in the commune of Winseler, in north-western Luxembourg.

== Population ==
As of September 2026, the village has a population of 468.

== Historical and linguistic backgrounds ==
Doncols is known as an historically Walloon-speaking village, similarly to Sonlez. A. Atten's 'Li leu d' Doncô' is considered the sole instance of a Walloon language text to have been written by a Grand Ducal national. (See the 'External link', below.)

Even by Luxembourg's trilingual standards, the village is noted for the number of different spellings of its name in various languages. Doncols is its spelling in French, Donkols in German, Donkels in Luxembourgish, and Doncô in Walloon.

== See also ==
- Sonlez#Linguistic features
