= Walloon language =

Gallo-Romance language spoken primarily in Wallonia

Walloon
- walon
- Native to: Belgium, France
- Region: Wallonia, Ardennes, minority in Door County, Wisconsin (United States)
- Ethnicity: Walloons
- Native speakers: 600,000 people have some knowledge of it (2007); Possibly only 300,000 active speakers in rural Wallonia
- Language family: Indo-European: Italic; Latino-Faliscan; Latin; Romance; Italo-Western; Western Romance; Gallo-Iberian?; Gallo-Romance; Gallo-Rhaetian?; Arpitan–Oïl; Oïl; Walloon
- Early forms: Old Latin: Vulgar Latin; Proto-Romance; Old Gallo-Romance; Old French
- Dialects: Wisconsin Walloon
- Writing system: Latin (Walloon orthography)

Official status
- Recognised minority language in: French Community of Belgium

Language codes
- ISO 639-1: wa
- ISO 639-2: wln
- ISO 639-3: wln
- Glottolog: wall1255
- ELP: Walloon
- Linguasphere: 51-AAA-hf
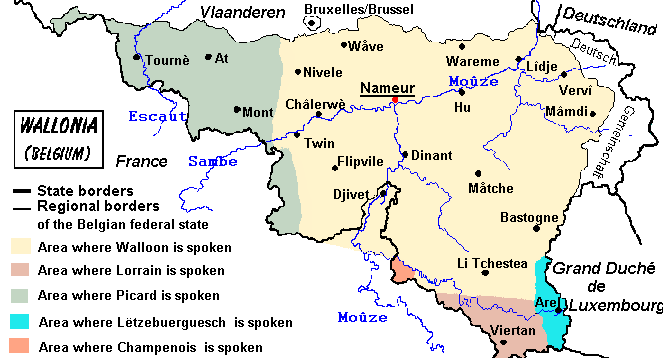
- Linguistic map of Wallonia

- Walloon is classified as Definitely Endangered by the UNESCO Atlas of the World's Languages in Danger (2010)

Walloon (/wɒˈluːn/; natively walon; French: wallon, Belgian French pronunciation: [walõ]) is a Romance language that is spoken in much of Wallonia and, to a very small extent, in Brussels, Belgium; some villages near Givet, northern France; and a clutch of communities in northeastern Wisconsin, United States.

It belongs to the langues d'oïl dialect continuum, the most prominent member of which is French. The historical background of its formation was the territorial extension since 980 of the Principality of Liège to the south and west. Walloon is classified as "definitely endangered" by the UNESCO Atlas of the World's Languages in Danger.

Despite its rich literature, beginning anonymously in the 16th century and with well-known authors since 1756, the use of Walloon has decreased markedly since France's annexation of Wallonia in 1794. This period definitely established French as the language of social promotion, far more than it was before. After World War I, public schools provided French-speaking education to all children, inducing a denigration of Walloon, especially when accompanied by official orders in 1952 to punish its use in schools. Subsequently, since the middle of the 20th century, generational transmission of the language has decreased, resulting in Walloon almost becoming a dead language. Today it is scarcely spoken among younger people, with the vast majority of its native speakers being the elderly (aged 65 and over). In 2007, the number of people with knowledge of the language was estimated at 600,000.

Numerous associations, especially theatre companies, are working to keep the language alive. Formally recognized as a langue régionale endogène (regional indigenous language) of Belgium since 1990, Walloon has also benefited from a continued corpus planning process. The "Feller system" (1900) regularized transcription of the different accents. Since the 1990s, a common orthography was established (the Rifondou walon), which allowed large-scale publications, such as the Walloon Wikipedia officially in 2003. In 2004, a Walloon translation of a Tintin comic was released under the name L'èmerôde d'al Castafiore; in 2007 an album consisting of Gaston Lagaffe comic strips was published in Walloon.

Walloon is more distinct as a language than Belgian French, which differs from the French spoken in France only in some minor points of vocabulary and pronunciation.

== Disputed nature of Walloon ==
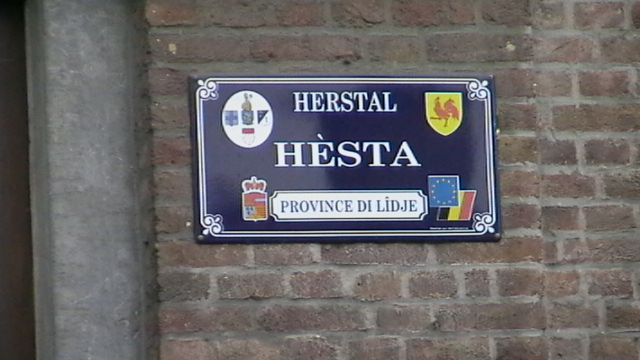
Hèsta, the Walloon name of the city of Herstal

Linguists had long classified Walloon as a dialect of French, which in turn is a langue d'oïl. Like French, it descended from Vulgar Latin. Arguing that a French-speaking person could not understand Walloon easily, especially in its eastern forms, Jules Feller (1859–1940) insisted that Walloon had an original "superior unity", which made it a language.

The phonological divisions of regional languages of southern Belgium were studied by the contemporary linguist E.B. Atwood. He defined the precise geographical repartition of the four chief dialects of Walloon. In addition, he defined them against the dialects of Picard, Lorrain and Champenois.

Since then, most linguists (among them Louis Remacle), and gradually also Walloon politicians, regard Walloon as a regional language, the first in importance in Wallonia. It is the only one to have originated from that part of Belgium. The eleventh edition of the Encyclopædia Britannica identified Walloon as the "northernmost Romance language".

== Geographic distribution ==
=== Walloon ===
Walloon is spoken in the Wallonia Region in Belgium. In addition, it is spoken in:

- a small part of France: the Pointe de Givet in northern Ardennes, and several villages in the Nord département, making it one of the regional languages of France;
- a small district of Door County, Wisconsin, US, owing to fairly large-scale immigration there in the 19th century; as well as portions of Kewaunee County, Wisconsin, US, and Brown County, Wisconsin, US; and
- Brussels, by some Walloon residents.

Although Walloon was widely spoken until the mid-20th century, today only a small proportion of the inhabitants of the region are fluent in the language. Those born since the 1970s usually know little more than a few idiomatic expressions, often profanities. The Walloon language is still part of the Walloon heritage; it is one component of Walloon identity.

=== Dialects ===
Main subdivisions of Walloon dialects

Four dialects of Walloon developed in four distinct zones of Wallonia:

- Central, spoken in Namur (Nameur), the Wallon capital, and the cities of Wavre (Åve) and Dinant;
- Eastern – in many respects the most conservative and idiosyncratic of the dialects, spoken in Liège (Lidje), Verviers (Vervî), Malmedy (Måmdi), Huy (Hu), and Waremme (Wareme);
- Western – the dialect closest to French proper and with a strong Picard influence, spoken in Charleroi (Tchårlerwè), Nivelles (Nivele), and Philippeville (Flipvile); and
- Southern – close to the Lorrain and to a lesser extent Champenois languages, spoken in Bastogne, Marche-en-Famenne (Måtche-el-Fåmene), and Neufchâteau (Li Tchestea), all in the Ardennes region.

Despite local phonetic differences, there is a regional movement towards the adoption of a common spelling, called the Rifondou walon. This orthography is diasystemic, reflecting different pronunciations for different readers, a concept inspired by the spelling of Breton. The written forms attempt to reconcile current phonetic uses with ancient traditions (notably the reintroduction of xh and oi that were used for writing Walloon until the late 19th century) and the language's own phonological logic.

=== Other regional languages ===
Other regional languages spoken in Wallonia, outside the Walloon domain, are:

- Picard, in Mons, Ath, and Tournai;
- Lorrain (also called Gaumais locally), in Virton;
- Champenois, in Bohan; and
- Luxembourgish, in Arlon and Martelange.

The Picard, Lorrain and Champenois dialects spoken in Wallonia are sometimes also referred to as "Walloon", which may lead to confusion.

== Phonetics and phonology ==
=== Phonology ===
Consonant phonemes of Walloon
		Labial	Dental/ Alveolar	Post- alveolar	Palatal	Velar, Uvular	Glottal
Nasal		m	n		ɲ		
Plosive/ Affricate	voiceless	p	t	t͡ʃ		k	
Plosive/ Affricate	voiced	b	d	d͡ʒ		ɡ	
Fricative	voiceless	f	s	(ʃ)¹	(ç)²	(χ)²	h
Fricative	voiced	v	z	(ʒ)¹			
Trill			(r)³			ʀ	
Approximant			l		j	w	

- ¹In Liege Walloon and neighbouring dialects, non-word-initial /ʃ/ and /ʒ/ are merged with /h/.
  - ²In some dialects, especially southern ones, /h/ (and /ʃ/, /ʒ/) are [ç] or [χ] word-finally.
- ³/ʀ/ may be [r] among some speakers.

Vowel phonemes
	Front						Back		
	unrounded			rounded			Back		
	oral	long	nasal	oral	long	nasal	oral	long	nasal
(Near-)Close	i	iː		y	yː		u	uː	
Close-mid	e	eː	ẽ		øː		o	oː	
Open-mid	ɛ	ɛː	ɛ̃	œ		œ̃	ɔ	ɔː	ɔ̃
Open	a	aː	ã					ɑː	ɑ̃

- /oː, uː/ can have an allophone of [ʊː].

Vowels heavily change based on dialects.

=== Rifondou pronunciation ===
Unified Walloon provides a unified way to pronounce the vowels, although some sounds still vary based on dialect. All consonant variations were explained in the above section. Here is the Unified vowel chart:

	Front					Back		
	unrounded			rounded		Back		
	oral	long	nasal	oral	long	oral	long	nasal
Close	i	iː		y	yː	u	uː	
Close-mid	e		ẽ		øː			õ
Open-mid	ɛ	ɛː	ɛ̃			ɔ	ɔː	ɔ̃
Open	a		ã					

The short high vowels are often pronounced /ɪ ʊ/.

=== Dialectal variation ===
The following is a table of phonemes varying based on dialects:

Rifondou	Feller			
N/A	Liège (east-walloon)	Bastogne (south-walloon)	Namur (center-walloon)	Charleroi (west-walloon)
xh	h /h/	ch /ʃ/		
jh	h /h/	j /ʒ/		
sch	h /h/	ch /ʃ/		sk /sk/, esk /ɛsk/
sh	s /s/	ch /ʃ/		
å	å, â /ɔː/	â /aː/	â /aː/, ô /oː/	â /aː/, ô /oː/
å	å, â /ɔː/	â /aː/	â /aː/, ô /oː/	âr /aːʀ/, ô /oː/
ea	ê /ɛː/		ia /ja/	
ae	è, e /ɛ/		a /a/	a /a/
ae	è, e /ɛ/		a /a/	â /aː/
ey	èy /ɛj/	îy /iːj/, î /iː/		
oe	eu, eû /øː/	wâ /waː/	wè /wɛ/	
oen	on /ɔ̃/	wè /wɛ/	win /wɛ̃/	
én	in /ɛ̃/			én /ẽ/, é /e/
oi	wè /wɛ/	wa /wa/		ô /oː/, ou /u/, oû /uː/
ai	é /e/, ê /ɛː/, è, e /ɛ̃/	é /e/, ê /ɛː/		
é	é /e/, è /ɛ/	i /i/	é /e/, è /ɛ/	i /i/
ô	ô^{n} /õ/, on /ɔ̃/	ou /u/, oû /uː/	ô /oː/	ou /u/, oû /uː/
	cw, kw, qw /kw/, k, q[u] /k/			
	i /i/, u /y/, è /ɛ/	ë, e̊ /ə/	i /i/	è /ɛ/
	ou /u/	u /y/		

If there is a Rifondou grapheme for the sound, the source is. Otherwise, it is precised. These last two sounds are written as ⟨i⟩ and ⟨ou⟩ in Rifondou, as in rifondou. /kw~k/ is normalised as kw.

=== Evolution from Latin ===
- Latin /k/ before /a/ and /ɡ/ before /e/, /i/, or /a/ gave Walloon affricate phonemes spelled tch /t͡ʃ/ and dj /d͡ʒ/: vatche (vs. French vache "cow"), djambe (Fr. jambe "leg").
- Latin [s] persisted in clusters: spene (Fr. épine "thorn, spine"), fistu "wisp of straw", mwaîsse (Fr. maître "master"), fiesse (Fr. fête "party, feast"), tchestea (Fr. château "castle"), and so on.
- Final obstruent devoicing: rodje "red" is pronounced exactly as rotche "rock".
- Nasal vowels may be followed by nasal consonants, as in djonne "young", crinme "cream", mannet "dirty", etc.
- Vowel length has a phonological value. It allows distinguishing cu "arse" and cû "cooked", i l' hosse "he cradles her" and i l' hôsse "he increases it", messe "mass" and mêsse "master", etc.

== Orthography ==
The Walloon alphabet generally consists of the basic ISO Latin Alphabet, and six types of diacritic. It also makes frequent use of digraphs. Various orthographies have been used, most notably the Feller system (sistinme Feller) and Unified Walloon (rifondou walon or rfondou walon).

== Characteristics ==
=== Language family ===
Walloon is distinguished from other languages in the langue d'oïl family both by archaism coming from Latin and by its significant borrowing from Germanic languages, as expressed in its phonetics, its lexicon, and its grammar. At the same time, Walloon phonetics are singularly conservative: the language has stayed fairly close to the form it took during the High Middle Ages.

=== Morphology ===
- The plural feminine adjectives before the noun take an unstressed ending -ès (except in the Ardenne dialect): compare li djaene foye "the yellow leaf" and les djaenès foyes "the yellow leaves".
- There is no gender difference in definite articles and possessives (except in the Ardenne dialect): compare Walloon li vweteure ("the car", feminine) and li cir ("the sky", masculine), with French la voiture and le ciel; Walloon has si coir ("his/her body", masculine) and si finiesse ("his/her window", feminine) with French son corps and sa fenêtre.

=== Lexicon ===
- Walloon has a few Latin remnants that have disappeared from neighboring Romance languages: compare Walloon dispierter to Spanish despertar and Romanian deștepta (all with the same meaning: "to awaken").
- The most distinctive feature is its number of borrowings from Germanic languages (Dutch and German dialects): compare Walloon flåwe to today's Dutch flauw "weak" (cognate of English flaw). Other common borrowings, among hundreds of others, are dringuele ("tip"; Dutch drinkgeld), crole ("curl"; Dutch krul), spiter ("to spatter"; same root as the English to spit, and to spew, or German spützen; Dutch spuwen), li sprewe (the starling; Dutch spreeuw, or German Sperling).

=== Syntax ===
- The adjective is often placed before the noun: compare Walloon on foirt ome with French un homme fort, "a strong man"; ene blanke måjhon and French une maison blanche, "a white house".
- Borrowing from Germanic languages, the construction Cwè çki c'est di ça po ene fleur? "What kind of flower is this?" can be compared word for word to German Was ist das für eine Blume? and Dutch Wat is dat voor een bloem?, as opposed to Standard French Quelle sorte de fleur est-ce? or (colloquially) Quelle sorte de fleur est-ce que c'est?.

== History ==
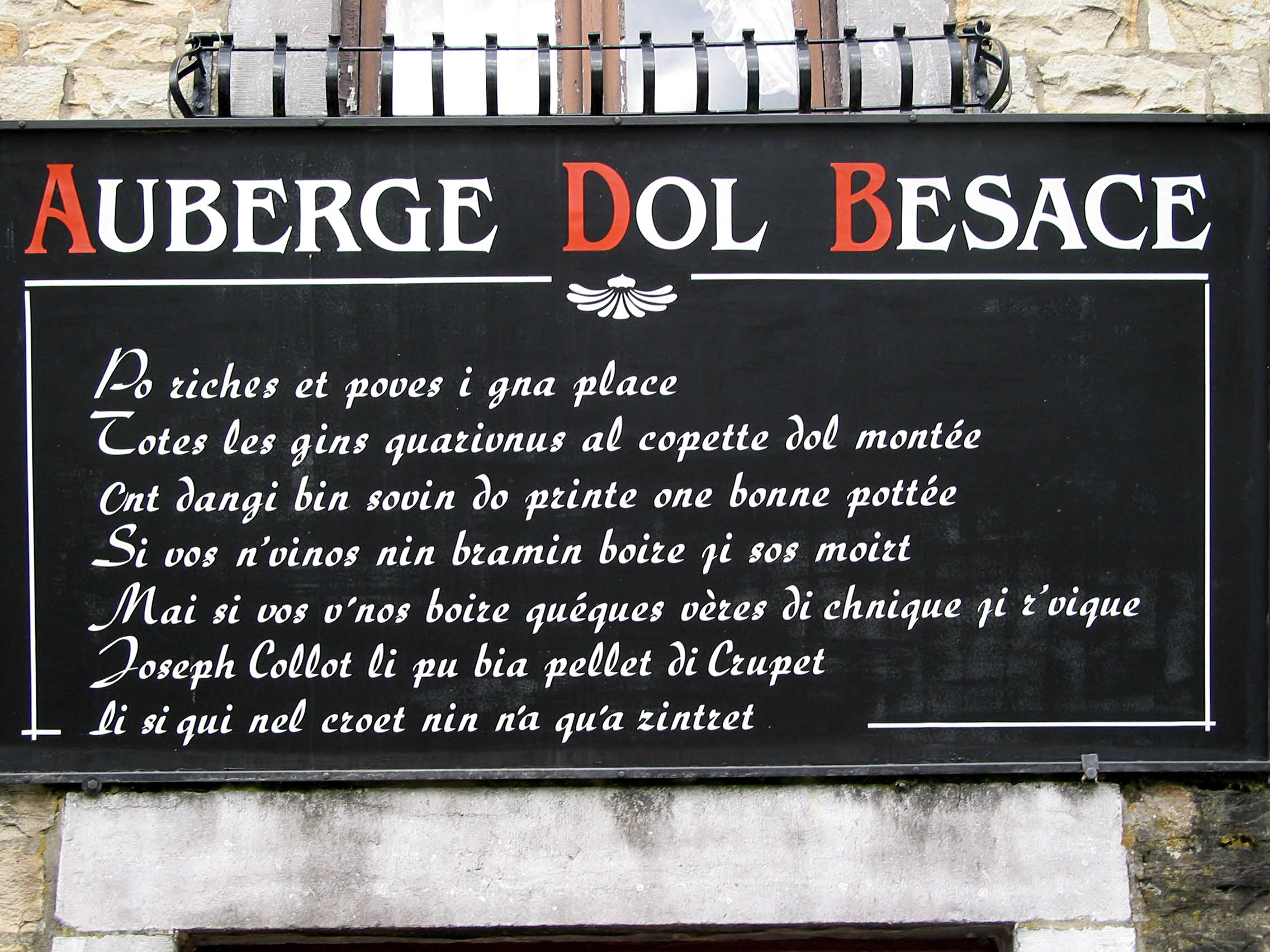
An auberge's sign in Crupet

From a linguistic point of view, Louis Remacle has shown that a good number of the developments that we now consider typical of Walloon appeared between the 8th and 12th centuries. Walloon "had a clearly defined identity from the beginning of the 13th century". In any case, linguistic texts from the time do not mention the language, although they mention others in the langue d'oïl family, such as Picard and Lorrain. During the 15th century, scribes in the region called the language "Roman" when they needed to distinguish it. It is not until the beginning of the 16th century that first occurrence of the word "Walloon" appeared in the current linguistic sense. In 1510 or 1511, Jean Lemaire de Belges made the connection between Rommand to Vualon:

Et ceux cy [les habitants de Nivelles] parlent le vieil langage Gallique que nous appellons Vualon ou Rommand (...). Et de ladite ancienne langue Vualonne, ou Rommande, nous usons en nostre Gaule Belgique: Cestadire en Haynau, Cambresis, Artois, Namur, Liège, Lorraine, Ardenne et le Rommanbrabant, et est beaucoup differente du François, lequel est plus moderne, et plus gaillart.

And those people [the inhabitants of Nivelles] speak the old Gallic language which we call Vualon or Rommand (...). And we use the said old Vualon or Rommand language in our Belgian Gaul: That is to say in Hainaut, Cambrai, Artois, Namur, Liège, Lorraine, Ardennes and Rommand Brabant, and it is very different from French, which is more fashionable and courtly.

The word "Walloon" thus came closer to its current meaning: the vernacular of the Roman part of the Low Countries. One might say that the period which saw the establishment of the unifying supremacy of the Burgundians in the Walloon country was a turning-point in their linguistic history. The crystallization of a Walloon identity, as opposed to that of the thiois (i.e. Dutch-speaking) regions of the Low Countries, established "Walloon" as a word for designating its people. Somewhat later, the vernacular of these people became more clearly distinct from central French and other neighbouring langues d'oïl, prompting the abandonment of the vague term "Roman" as a linguistic, ethnic, and political designator for "Walloon".

Also at this time, following the Ordinance of Villers-Cotterêts in 1539, the French language replaced Latin for all administrative purposes in France. Established as the academic language, French became the object of a political effort at normalization; La Pléiade posited the view that when two languages of the same language family coexist, each can be defined only in opposition to the other. Around the year 1600, the French writing system became dominant in the Wallonia. From this time, too, dates a tradition of texts written in a language marked by traces of spoken Walloon. The written language of the preceding centuries, scripta, was a composite language with some Walloon characteristics but it did not attempt to be a systematic reproduction of the spoken language.

== Walloon society and culture ==
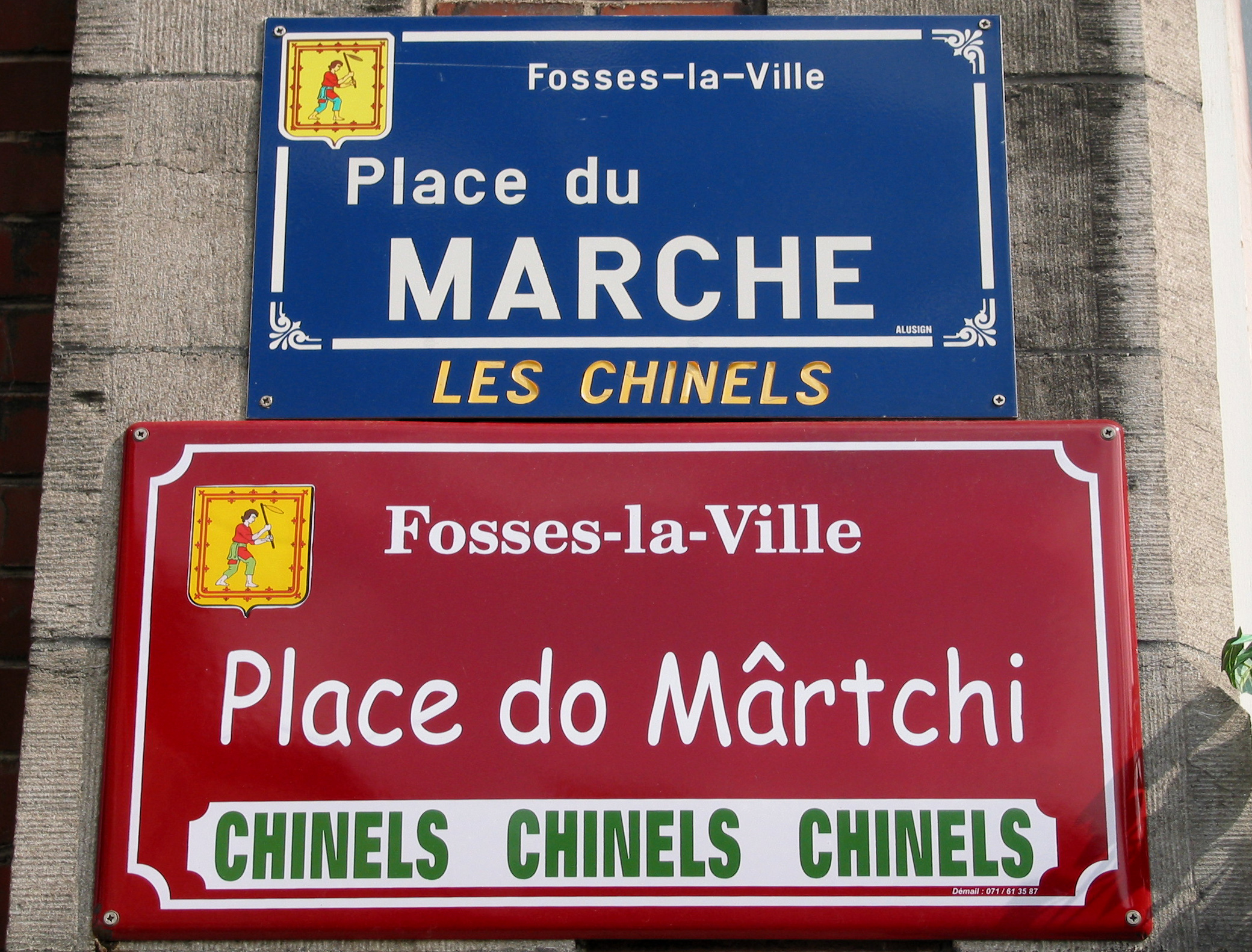
Bilingual French-Walloon street sign in Fosses-la-Ville

Walloon was the predominant language of the Walloon people until the beginning of the 20th century, although they had a passing knowledge of French. Since that time, the use of French has spread to the extent that now only 15% of the Walloon population speak their ancestral language. Breaking the statistics down by age, 70–80% of the population aged over 60 speak Walloon, while only about 10% of those under 30 do so. Passing knowledge of Walloon is much more widespread: claimed by some 36–58% of the younger age bracket. Laurent Hendschel estimates there are 1,300,000 bilingual people in Wallonia (Walloon-French, Picard-French...). Many French words that pertain to mining and to the textile trade derive from the Walloon-Picard complex.

Legally, Walloon has been recognized since 1990 by the French Community of Belgium, the cultural authority of Wallonia, as an "indigenous regional language" which must be studied in schools and encouraged. The Walloon cultural movement includes the Union Culturelle Wallonne, an organization of over 200 amateur theatre circles, writers' groups, and school councils. About a dozen Walloon magazines publish regularly. The Société de langue et de littérature wallonne, founded in 1856, promotes Walloon literature and the study (dialectology, etymology, etc.) of the regional Roman languages of Wallonia.

== Literature ==
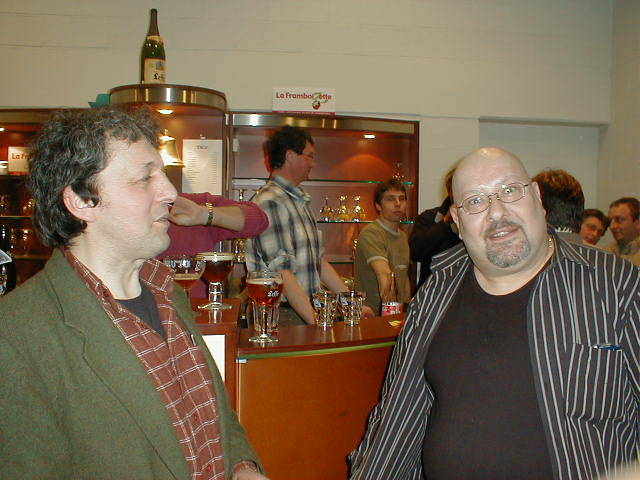
The singer William Dunker (right)

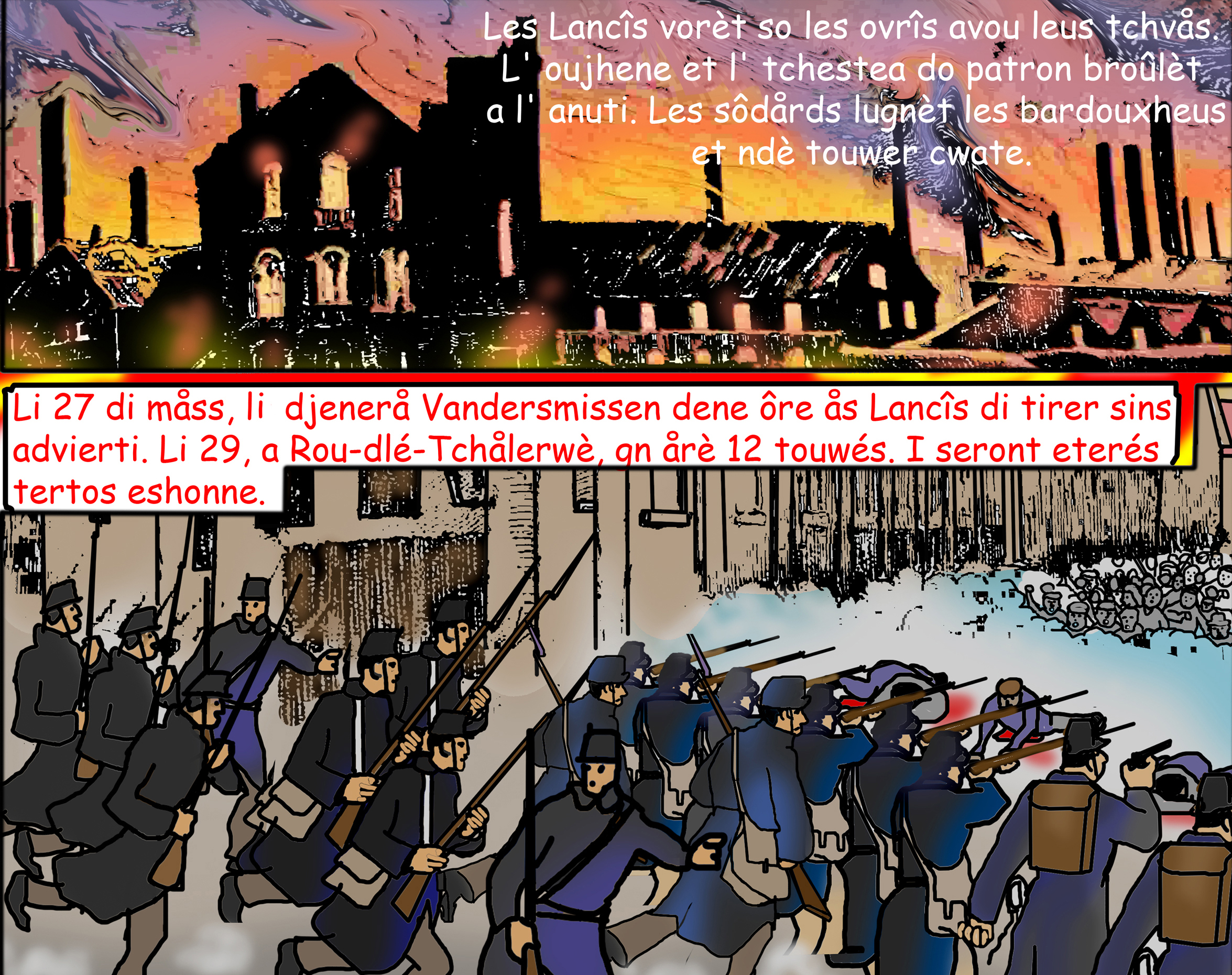
Cartoon in Walloon by José Schoovaerts for a 2010 issue of Walloon-speaking magazine Li Rantoele

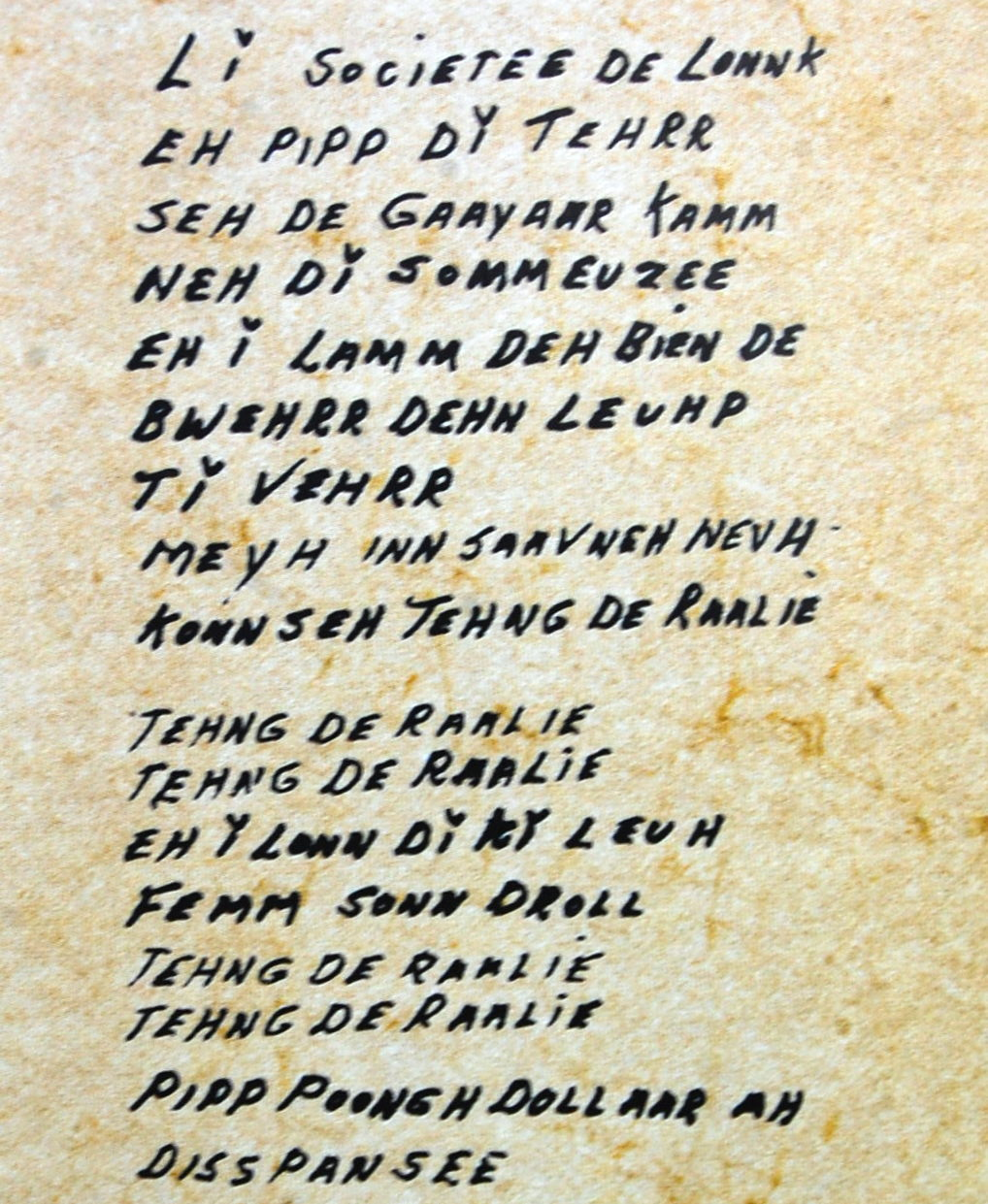
Walloon lyrics to the song "Tins d' eraler" (Time to go home).

Walloon-language literature has been printed since the 16th century, or at least since the beginning of the 17th century. It had its "golden age" during the peak of the Flemish immigration to Wallonia in the 19th century: "That period saw an efflorescence of Walloon literature, plays and poems primarily, and the founding of many theaters and periodicals."

The New York Public Library holds a large collection of literary works in Walloon, quite possibly the largest outside Belgium, and its holdings are representative of the output. Out of nearly a thousand works, twenty-six were published before 1880. Thereafter the numbers rise gradually year by year, reaching a peak of sixty-nine in 1903. After that, publications in Walloon fell markedly, to eleven in 1913. Yves Quairiaux counted 4,800 plays for 1860–1914, published or not. In this period, plays were almost the only popular entertainment in Wallonia. The Walloon-language theatre remains popular in the region; theatre is flourishing with more than 200 non-professional companies playing in the cities and villages of Wallonia for an audience of over 200,000 each year.

During the 19th-century renaissance of Walloon-language literature, several authors adapted versions of Aesop's Fables to the racy speech (and subject matter) of Liège. They included Charles Duvivier (in 1842); Joseph Lamaye (1845); and the team of Jean-Joseph Dehin (1847, 1851–1852) and François Bailleux (1851–1866), who covered books I-VI. Adaptations into other dialects were made by Charles Letellier (Mons, 1842) and Charles Wérotte (Namur, 1844). Decades later, Léon Bernus published some hundred imitations of La Fontaine in the dialect of Charleroi (1872); he was followed during the 1880s by Joseph Dufrane, writing in the Borinage dialect under the pen-name Bosquètia. In the 20th century, Joseph Houziaux (1946) published a selection of 50 fables in the Condroz dialect. The motive among Walloon speakers in both France and Belgium was to assert regional identity against the growing centralism and encroachment of the language of the capital, on what had until then been predominantly monoglot areas.

There are links between French literature and Walloon literature. For instance, the writer Raymond Queneau set the publication of a Walloon Poets' anthology for Editions Gallimard. Ubu roi was translated into Walloon by André Blavier, an important 'pataphysician of Verviers, and friend of Queneau, for the new and important Puppet theater of Liège of Jacques Ancion. The Al Botroûle theater operated "as the umbilical cord" in Walloon, indicating a desire to return to the source. Jacques Ancion also wanted to develop a regular adult audience. "From the 19th century he included the Walloon play Tati l'Pèriquî by E. Remouchamps and the avant-garde Ubu roi by A. Jarry." The scholar Jean-Marie Klinkenberg writes, "[T]he dialectal culture is no more a sign of attachment to the past but a way to participate to a new synthesis".

Walloon is also being used in popular song. The best-known singer in Walloon in present-day Wallonia is William Dunker (b. 15 March 1959).

== Phrases ==
Walloon	Phonetic	French	Limburgian	Dutch	German	English
Walon	[walɔ̃]	Wallon	Waals	Waals	Wallonisch	Walloon
Diè wåde	[djɛ woːt] / [djɛ wɔːt]	Adieu	Diè wah	Tot ziens	Tschüss	Bye (from Goodbye, a contraction of "God be with ye")
Bondjoû	[bɔ̃dʒuː]	Bonjour	Daag	Goedendag	Guten Tag	Hello (Good day)
A	[a]	Salut	Ha/haj	Hoi	Hallo	Hi (often followed by another expression)
A rvey	[arvɛj]	Au revoir	Saluu/Daag/Hajje/Diè wah	Tot ziens	Auf Wiedersehen	Goodbye (lit. See you again/See you later)
Cmint dit-st on?	[kmɛ̃ dɪstɔ̃]	Comment dit-on?	Wie zaet me?	Hoe zegt men?	Wie sagt man?	How do you say (How does one say)?
Cmint daloz?	[kmɛ̃ dalɔ]	Comment allez-vous?	Wie geit 't?	Hoe gaat het?	Wie geht es?	How are you? (How goes it? / How's it going?)
Dji n' sais nén	[dʒɪn sɛː nɛ̃ ] / [dʒɪn se nẽ]	Je ne sais pas	Ich weit 't neet	Ik weet het niet	Ich weiß es nicht	I don't know

Walloon pronunciation

Below is the first article of the United Nations Universal Declaration of Human Rights in Walloon, French and German.

- Walloon: Tos lès-omes vinèt-st-å monde lîbes, èt so-l’minme pîd po çou qu’ènn’èst d’leu dignité èt d’leus dreûts. I n’sont nin foû rêzon èt-z-ont-i leû consyince po zèls, çou qu’èlzès deût miner a s’kidûre onk’ po l’ôte tot come dès frés.
- French: Tous les êtres humains naissent libres et égaux en dignité et en droits. Ils sont doués de raison et de conscience et doivent agir les uns envers les autres dans un esprit de fraternité.
- German: Alle Menschen sind frei und gleich an Würde und Rechten geboren. Sie sind mit Vernunft und Gewissen begabt und sollen einander im Geiste der Brüderlichkeit begegnen.

== See also ==
- Languages of Belgium
- Walloons – the people
- Doncols & Sonlez: formerly Walloon-speaking villages in the Grand Duchy of Luxembourg.
- Manifesto for Walloon culture
- Flemish dialects
- History of the term Wallon
